= Kenneth Chesebro =

American disbarred attorney (born 1961)

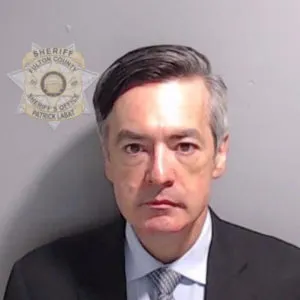
- Mug shot of Kenneth Chesebro, released by the Fulton County, Georgia, sheriff's office
- Born: Kenneth John Chesebro; June 5, 1961 (age 65); Wisconsin, U.S.
- Education: Northwestern University (BS); Harvard University (JD)
- Political party: Democratic (before 2016); Independent (2016–present)
- Criminal charges: 7 Georgia state charges: Georgia RICO Act; Conspiracy to impersonate a public officer; Conspiracy to commit forgery (2 counts); Conspiracy to make false statements (2 counts); Conspiracy to file false documents; 1 Wisconsin state charge: Conspiracy to utter a forgery
- Criminal penalty: 5 years suspended sentence; $5,000 restitution; 100 hours of community service; Suspended from legal practice
- Criminal status: Plea bargain, pleaded guilty to: conspiracy to commit filing false documents (Georgia)
- Spouse: Emily Stevens (m. 1994; div. 2016)

Kenneth John Chesebro (/ˈtʃɛzbroʊ/ CHEZ-broh; born June 5, 1961) is an American attorney known as the architect of the Trump fake electors plot that conspired to overturn the 2020 U.S. presidential election.

On August 14, 2023, Chesebro was indicted along with eighteen others in the Georgia election racketeering prosecution. On October 20, he pleaded guilty to one felony count of conspiracy to commit filing false documents. As part of his plea bargain, Chesebro accepted five years of probation, $5,000 in restitution, 100 hours of community service, and agreed to testify against Donald Trump and the remaining defendants.

In 2025, Chesebro was disbarred from legal practice in New York, Washington, D.C., and Illinois.

== Early life and education ==
Kenneth Chesebro was born in 1961 and raised in Wisconsin Rapids, about 100 miles north of Madison, Wisconsin. His father, Donald Chesebro, was a U.S. Army veteran and music teacher and his mother was a speech therapist.

In high school and college, Chesebro was a competitive debater. He graduated from Northwestern University with a Bachelor of Science in communication, economics, and politics in 1983. He then attended Harvard Law School, where he served as an editor of the Harvard Law Review and was classmates with Elena Kagan and Jeffrey Toobin, earning his Juris Doctor (J.D.) in 1986. During law school, Chesebro, Kagan, and Ron Klain were research assistants for Harvard Law School professor Laurence Tribe.

== Legal career ==
After law school, Chesebro was a law clerk to U.S. district judge Gerhard Gesell of the U.S. District Court for the District of Columbia from 1986 to 1987. Gesell was known as a liberal jurist who presided over high-profile cases including the Nixon administration's case involving the Pentagon papers, where he ruled in favor of The Washington Post.

In 1987, Chesebro opened his own law firm in Cambridge, Massachusetts. For at least the next 13 years he continued to do occasional work with Laurence Tribe, including working on Bush v. Gore in support of Vice President Al Gore. In 2023, Tribe said that Chesebro was "obviously bright and seemingly decent." Tribe also stated that "even though we used to be friends, I really think he should never again be allowed to practice law."

Starting in 2016, Chesebro's legal work began to support conservative causes and prominent Republicans. That year, along with John Eastman, he filed an amicus brief with the Supreme Court in a case involving citizenship of residents of American Samoa. In 2018, he represented Republican politicians, including Ted Cruz and Mike Lee, in a Utah voting rights case.

== Political affiliation ==
Until 2016, Chesebro was a registered Democrat. He changed his registration in Massachusetts to unaffiliated. A few years later he moved to New York, where he also registered as unaffiliated.

Chesebro skewered the "Reagan Administration ideologues and their colleagues in Congress" in a 1993 article in the American University Law Review. Later in the 1990s, he donated to Bill Clinton. In 2000 Chesebro donated to John Kerry's senate campaign. In 2004, he was an enthusiastic fan of Barack Obama, after Obama's convention speech that year. He also donated to Wisconsin Democratic Senator Russ Feingold.

In 2016, Chesebro began supporting Republicans, with contributions to JD Vance, Ron Johnson, and others. Senator Johnson had arrived in the Senate after defeating Feingold in Chesebro's native state of Wisconsin. In 2020, Chesebro donated $2,800 to the Trump campaign.

Chesebro has donated more than $50,000 to Republicans.

== "Alternate slate" strategy ==
The strategy, as proposed by Chesebro, seems to have evolved over time, starting with simple advice by Chesebro that Republican elector candidates meet and vote at the appropriate time and place, despite the election having apparently gone against Trump (and follow the other steps required as if they were the appointed electors). The reasoning was that legal precedent indicated that were Wisconsin decide, for any reason, that Trump had actually won in Wisconsin, these elector votes would be required to be registered. By December 6 the strategy covered all six "contested" states (Arizona, Georgia, Michigan, Nevada, Pennsylvania and Wisconsin), and included a possible challenge to the constitutionality of the Electoral Count Act, on the grounds that the constitution gave the leader of the Senate the duty to both open and count the electoral college votes. In this incarnation, there were required to be legal challenges in all six states that had a plausible chance of succeeding. At this point the "alternate slate" terminology is first used, and the rest of the strategy (apart from the creation of the "alternate slates") is described as an option rather than an essential step. While the outcome of the strategy is not described as a guaranteed (immediate) Trump victory, the alternative is winning time for litigation and at the very least drawing public opinion to "evidence of electoral abuses by the Democrats".

=== Legal work ===
Working as an outside advisor, Chesebro wrote multiple memos to Jim Troupis, a former Wisconsin judge and a lawyer with the Trump campaign. The first memo is dated November 18, the second is dated December 6, and the third is dated December 9, 2020. A fourth memo, addressed to Trump lawyer Rudy Giuliani, is dated December 13, 2020. The memos outlined a plan to maintain Trump's position as president after his first term expired on January 20, 2021.

Focused on challenging the Wisconsin vote, Chesebro argued in the November 18 memo that "the Presidential election timetable affords ample time for judicial proceedings". He asserted that January 6 was the only deadline that mattered for settling a dispute over a state's legal slate of electoral votes. Citing the 1960 United States presidential election in Hawaii as an example of a competing slate of electors, Chesebro suggested that the Trump campaign should submit their own electoral certificates in Wisconsin on December 14 in preparation for the scenario that a court decision, or a "state legislative determination", is made in their favor.

The New York Times first revealed the November 18 and December 9, 2020, memos on February 2, 2022. The December 6, 2020, memo was not made public until Trump's federal indictment in the 2020 election interference case on August 1, 2023. The Times called the December 6 memo "a missing piece in the public record of how Mr. Trump's allies developed their strategy" to overturn the election.

The December 6 memo expanded Chesebro's scope beyond Wisconsin into a national strategy. The strategy was to have Trump–Pence electors in six allegedly contested states submit their own "alternate" slates of purported electoral certificates in anticipation that Vice President Mike Pence would claim unilateral authority to count the votes in his role as president of the Senate. Chesebro stated that he believed the strategy was "constitutionally defensible" but acknowledged that the Supreme Court might rule against it and said he was "not necessarily advising" it. The memo was nevertheless written with a sense of urgency to act, its title being "Important That All Trump-Pence Electors Vote on December 14." Chesebro concluded the memo in stating that it "seems advisable for the campaign to seriously consider" his suggested course of action. Chesebro believed that his plan would focus the public's attention on alleged "electoral abuses by the Democrats" and to "buy the Trump campaign more time to win litigation that would deprive Biden of electoral votes and/or add to Trump's column".

The December 9 memo largely focused on providing a "general overview" of the legal requirements regarding the submission of electoral votes, under both federal law and the respective laws of the six states "in controversy". Chesebro additionally commented that, in spite of having no involvement from "the governor[s] or any other state official[s]", the Trump campaign's purported "alternate" electoral votes "might be eligible" for counting on January 6 if by then they were recognized "by a court, the state legislature, or Congress".

On December 13, 2020, Chesebro emailed a fourth memo to Giuliani and others, which further explained his legal and logistical arguments in regards to his "President of the Senate" strategy. Chesebro proposed a "chronology" of events where Pence would recuse himself from serving as the presiding officer of the United States Senate on January 6, claiming that the Electoral Count Act imposed duties on his role that go "beyond those set out in the Constitution", and that he would have a conflict of interest if he were to fill the role of senate president while being a candidate for the vice presidency. The votes would instead be opened by the president pro tempore, Chuck Grassley, or by "another senior Republican". During the counting procedure, the presiding officer would claim unilateral authority and obstruct the counting of the electoral votes of Arizona, arguing that the presence of both the Biden-Harris electoral votes and the Trump-Pence purported "alternate" electoral votes comprises a conflict of two competing slates of electors from the same state. The presiding officer would announce that Arizona would have to "rerun the election", "engage in adequate judicial review", or "have its legislature appoint electors", if it wanted to be represented in the electoral college results.

The memo presents what Chesebro claims is an originalist reading of the Twelfth Amendment to the United States Constitution. It is argued that the lack of an explicit granting of the vote-counting role to Congress implies that the power is instead held by the senate president, that Congress would not be able to act during a joint session, that Congress would not have enough time to deliberate over the vote-counting procedures, and that the vesting of the vote-counting role in Congress could potentially lead to a stalemate between the House and the Senate. As historical precedent, Chesebro cited the appointment of John Langdon as president pro tempore in 1789, which was recorded in the Annals of Congress as being for the purpose of "opening and counting the votes for President of the United States". Additionally, the memo claims that former vice presidents John Adams and Thomas Jefferson used their positions of senate president by invoking unilateral authority to count "improper" votes during the respective electoral counts of 1797 and 1801.

Grassley told Roll Call on January 5 that "We don't expect [Pence] to be there", though Grassley's office quickly walked back the statement and claimed that neither he nor his staff had been aware of the proposal. On March 28, 2022, Judge David O. Carter, after considering Chesebro's email during a court case, ruled: "President Trump's team transformed a legal interpretation of the Electoral Count Act into a day-by-day plan of action. The draft memo pushed a strategy that knowingly violated the Electoral Count Act".

The United States House Select Committee on the January 6 Attack concluded that Chesebro had sent the December 13 memo "upon request from Trump Campaign official Boris Epshteyn." On December 23, 2020, Trump campaign attorney John Eastman emailed Epshteyn the first of his own memos, commenting: "I'm fine with all of Ken [Chesebro]'s edits." On December 30, 2020, Chesebro emailed Eastman and others, saying he planned to stay at the Trump International Hotel in Washington, DC from January 3–8. The next day, Chesebro emailed Eastman and others, suggesting that U.S. Supreme Court Justice Clarence Thomas might be willing to rule that the Georgia count was in "doubt", and that such a ruling might be "good enough" for Pence and Congress to delay their consideration of Georgia's electors on January 6. On January 6, 2021, the day of the attack on the Capitol, Chesebro was on the Capitol grounds following Alex Jones. It is not known why he was there and "there is no indication" he entered the Capitol building.

The memos ultimately inspired the scheme in seven states, though Vice President Pence did not accept the Trump–Pence electors and refused to participate in the scheme. Laurence Tribe, Chesebro's former mentor, later joined an ethics complaint filed with the New York Bar regarding the December 6 memo. In an article for Just Security, Tribe complained: "Chesebro completely misused part of the latest edition of my constitutional law treatise."

Chesebro told Talking Points Memo in a June 2022 interview that his actions for the Trump campaign were "what lawyers do." In February 2024, CNN reported that Chesebro had concealed a secret Twitter account, BadgerPundit, from Michigan prosecutors. Under the account, Chesebro promoted a far more aggressive strategy to overturn the election than he had let on in his Michigan interview.

== Investigations and prosecutions ==
=== US House investigation ===
On March 1, 2022, Chesebro was subpoenaed by the January 6th committee. He fought the subpoena but testified on October 26. When asked where he was the first week of January 2021 and specifically on January 6, Chesebro invoked his Fifth Amendment right to remain silent. This committee concluded that he was the chief architect of the fake electors scheme used by Trump and his allies in an attempt to stay in power after losing the 2020 presidential election.

=== Georgia prosecution ===
In July 2022, he was subpoenaed by a grand jury in relation to the 2020 Georgia election investigation.

On August 14, 2023, Chesebro was indicted along with 18 other people in the prosecution related to the 2020 election in Georgia. He exercised his right to demand a speedy trial, and his trial was set for October 23, 2023. On September 1, he pleaded not guilty to seven criminal charges, including a violation of Georgia's RICO act and conspiracy to commit forgery, in the Georgia election subversion case, and he also waived his right to an arraignment hearing.

On September 21, his lawyers asked for five pieces of communication—including an email mentioned in the indictment as having been sent by Chesebro to Eastman on January 4, 2021—to be excluded from evidence. They argued that the documents were protected by attorney-client privilege. On October 10, Fulton County District Attorney Fani Willis argued that attorney-client privilege should not apply because the documents did not advise Trump on litigation but rather gave him a political strategy to use in Congress to interrupt the transfer of power to Biden. In this argument, she echoed prior rulings of U.S. District Judge David Carter.

On October 20, as jury selection began for his trial, Chesebro took a last-minute plea deal, including a single felony count of conspiracy to file false documents. He was sentenced to five years of probation and to pay $5,000 in restitution.

In 2024, as a consequence of his guilty plea in Georgia, he was suspended from practicing law in the state of New York, with the possibility of permanent disbarment left open.

=== Wisconsin prosecution ===
On June 4, 2024, Chesebro was indicted along with two others in the Wisconsin prosecution of fake electors. He was charged with a single count of conspiracy to utter forged official documents as legitimate.

=== Role in federal prosecution of 2020 election ===
On August 1, 2023, Trump was indicted in the federal prosecution for his attempts to overturn the 2020 election. Chesebro has been identified as Co-conspirator 5.

=== Involvement in Arizona prosecution ===
Chesebro was interviewed by Arizona Attorney General Kris Mayes during her investigation into the fake electors plot. Prosecutors questioned Chesebro about a meeting he had with Trump in the Oval Office in December 2020; Chesebro told them he had explained to Trump how his alternate electors could help them to win Arizona. During the Arizona prosecution of fake electors in 2024, Chesebro was referred to in the indictment as unindicted co-conspirator 4.

== Career after January 6, 2021 ==
Napoli Shkolnik, a New York–based personal injury firm, hired Chesebro in October 2022 to lead their law and motions department. He moved from New York to Puerto Rico, where other attorneys for the firm live. The day after the August 2023 indictment, the firm told reporters it had fired him.

== Suspension and disbarment ==
On October 31, 2024, Chesebro was suspended indefinitely from legal practice in New York. A year earlier, he had pleaded guilty to a felony in his criminal indictment in Fulton County, Georgia, over his efforts to overturn Trump's election loss in that state. The Third Department of the New York Supreme Court's Appellate Division recognized the felony as a "serious crime" that warranted barring him from practicing law in New York. He was also suspended from practicing in Florida and Illinois. On June 26, 2025, he was disbarred in New York in a per curiam decision from the Appellate Division, Third Department in Albany. The decision noted the seriousness of his criminal conduct, which indicated that he lacked the "integrity and fitness" to practice, and his "cavalier attitude regarding his actions". On June 11, 2026, the Supreme Court of Florida ruled in a 6-1 decision to lift Chesebro's suspension based on his criminal discharge under Georgia's First Offender Act. Justice Jorge Labarga dissented.

== Personal life ==
In 1994, Chesebro married Emily Stevens, a physician. They divorced in 2016.

Chesebro was an early bitcoin investor, netting several million dollars from a 2014 investment. Some former colleagues suggest this newfound wealth triggered his dramatic life-style change; he began to travel extensively, bought houses, divorced, and started donating to Republicans.

== See also ==
- List of alleged Georgia election racketeers
- List of people granted executive clemency in the second Trump presidency
