= Indictments against Donald Trump =

2023 charges against the then former U.S. president

- Date: March 25 – August 14, 2023
- Location: * New York Supreme Court; United States District Court for the Southern District of Florida; United States District Court for the District of Columbia; Fulton County Superior Court (Georgia)
- Arrests: Donald Trump (all four); Walt Nauta and Carlos De Oliveira (classified documents case); 18 co-defendants, including Rudy Giuliani and Mark Meadows (Georgia case)

In 2023, four criminal indictments were filed against Donald Trump, then a former president of the United States. Two were on state charges (one in New York and one in Georgia) and the other two, one of which was replaced by a superseding indictment, were on federal charges (one in Florida and one in the District of Columbia). Trump pleaded not guilty to all charges against him. He was convicted in New York, but charges were dropped in the Georgia case and the two federal cases.

On the state cases:

- The six-week-long New York trial lasted April 15–May 30, 2024 and resulted in the conviction of Trump on all 34 charges. However, on January 10, 2025, the judge issued an unconditional discharge.
- On June 5, 2024, the Georgia case was paused while the Georgia Court of Appeals decided whether to disqualify Fani Willis from prosecuting it, which it did in December. On November 26, 2025, the new prosecutor, Pete Skandalakis, dropped all charges.

On July 1, 2024, the Supreme Court ruled 6–3, that Trump had immunity for acts he committed as president that were considered official acts, while also ruling that he did not have immunity for unofficial acts. On November 6, Trump won the 2024 election; Justice Department policy would have precluded prosecuting him after his inauguration; Smith (whom Trump had threatened to fire) resigned before Trump's inauguration. Therefore, the federal cases were both dismissed:

- Judge Aileen Cannon dismissed the Florida case, ruling Jack Smith's appointment as special counsel was unconstitutional. The Office of the Special Counsel appealed the dismissal to the Eleventh Circuit Court of Appeals, but after Trump's 2024 election to the presidency, it asked the court to dismiss the case.
- The District of Columbia trial was put on hold in February 2024 while waiting for the Supreme Court to determine whether Trump is immune from prosecution. The case was returned to the District Court on August 2 to conduct hearings consistent with the Supreme Court's ruling. Following Trump's 2024 election to the presidency, however, the special counsel asked to dismiss the case.

Neither the indictments nor any resulting convictions would have disqualified his 2024 presidential candidacy. The Supreme Court separately addressed Trump's eligibility to be on the ballot and reversed all disqualifications by individual states.

In March 2026, a year into the second Trump presidency, Deputy Attorney General Todd Blanche told the Conservative Political Action Conference that every Justice Department employee who had worked on the investigations — over 200 people, according to him — had departed.

== Summary ==
Subject matter	Court	Indictment	No. of charges	Judge	Prosecutor	Trump legal team	Outcome
Falsifying Business Records	New York Supreme Court	March 30, 2023	34	Juan Merchan	Alvin Bragg	Todd Blanche; Emil Bove; Susan Necheles	Sentenced with unconditional discharge on January 10, 2025
Mishandling of national security documents	District Court for the Southern District of Florida	June 8, 2023	40	Aileen Cannon	Jack Smith	Todd Blanche; Lindsey Halligan; Chris Kise	Dismissed without prejudice July 15, 2024 (Note: Smith sought to remove Trump as a co-defendant on November 25, 2024. The Eleventh Circuit Court of Appeals granted Smith's motion to remove Trump as a co-defendant on November 26, 2024.)
Attempting to overturn the 2020 U.S. presidential election	District Court for the District of Columbia	August 1, 2023	4	Tanya S. Chutkan	Jack Smith	Todd Blanche; John Lauro	Dismissed without prejudice November 25, 2024
Racketeering to overturn the 2020 U.S. presidential election in Georgia	Fulton County Superior Court	August 14, 2023	8 (Note: There were originally 13; 5 were dismissed.)	Scott McAfee	Pete Skandalakis	Todd Blanche; Jennifer Little; Steven Sadow	Dismissed without prejudice November 26, 2025

== March 2023 indictment in New York ==
Trump was indicted on state charges in a March 2023 indictment in New York. He faced 34 criminal charges of falsifying business records in the first degree related to payments made to Stormy Daniels before the 2016 presidential election. The trial began on April 15, 2024; Trump was found guilty on all 34 counts on May 30, 2024. Sentencing was scheduled for September 18, but was delayed until November 26, 2024. On January 10, 2025, Trump received an unconditional discharge of his sentence.

== June 2023 federal indictment in Florida ==
Trump was indicted in June 2023 in the United States District Court for the Southern District of Florida in a federal indictment related to classified government documents. Trump faced 40 criminal charges alleging mishandling of sensitive documents and conspiracy to obstruct the government in retrieving these documents. The trial was scheduled for May 20, 2024, before being postponed indefinitely on May 7, 2024. On July 15, 2024, Judge Aileen Cannon dismissed the case, ruling Jack Smith's appointment as special counsel was unconstitutional. The Office of the Special Counsel appealed the dismissal to the Eleventh Circuit Court of Appeals, but it later chose to wind down the case following Trump's election in November 2024, in part due to its long-standing department policy not to prosecute a sitting president. It abandoned its appeal regarding Trump (which the court dismissed on November 25) and regarding Nauta and de Oliveira (dismissed on January 29, 2025).

== August 2023 federal indictment in Washington, D.C. ==
Trump was indicted in August 2023 in the United States District Court for the District of Columbia in a federal indictment related to attempts to overturn the 2020 presidential election. Trump faced four criminal charges of conspiring to defraud the government and disenfranchise voters, and corruptly obstructing an official proceeding. This case included Trump's involvement in the January 6 U.S. Capitol attack. On February 6, the DC Circuit Court of Appeals ruled that Trump does not have presidential immunity from prosecution. In an appeal on July 1, 2024, the United States Supreme Court ruled 6–3, along ideological lines, that Trump had immunity for acts he committed as president that were considered official acts, while also ruling that he did not have immunity for unofficial acts. The case was returned to Judge Tanya Chutkan on August 2 in accordance with Supreme Court rules. On November 25, 2024, Judge Tanya Chutkan of the U.S. District Court for the District of Columbia dismissed the case without prejudice.

== August 2023 indictment in Georgia ==
Trump was indicted on state charges in an August 2023 indictment in Georgia. Trump faced 8 criminal charges related to alleged attempts to overturn Joe Biden's victory in Georgia, alongside 18 accused co-conspirators. Trump initially faced 13 criminal charges, 5 of which were dismissed. The case was paused while an issue with its prosecutor was decided. In December 2024, the Georgia Court of Appeals disqualified Willis from prosecuting the case, and in September 2025, the Supreme Court of Georgia court declined to hear her appeal. In November 2025, Pete Skandalakis, executive director of the Prosecuting Attorneys' Council of Georgia, announced that, having been unable to find another willing prosecutor, he would take on the role himself. Less than two weeks later, on November 26, he dropped all charges against all remaining defendants, ending the case.
