= Post-election lawsuits related to the 2020 U.S. presidential election from Georgia =

In direct response to election changes related to the COVID-19 pandemic and 2020 United States presidential election in Georgia; the Donald Trump 2020 presidential campaign launched numerous civil lawsuits contesting the election processes of Georgia. All of these were either dismissed or dropped.

The State of Georgia v. Donald J. Trump, et al., a criminal indictment for racketeering, was filed against Donald Trump and 18 other defendants in 2023. Four defendants pleaded guilty. The case was eventually dropped as a result of Trump's election in 2024 and executive director of the Prosecuting Attorney's Council of Georgia Pete Skandalakis said the federal government was the appropriate site for the prosecution.

== Summary of lawsuits ==
Georgia post-election lawsuits related to the 2020 United States presidential election
| First filing date | Case | Court | Docket no(s). | Outcome | Comments | References |
|---|---|---|---|---|---|---|
| November 4, 2020 | In re: Enforcement of Election Laws and Securing Ballots Cast or Received after 7:00pm on November 3, 2020 | Chatham County Superior Court of the Eastern Judicial Circuit of Georgia | SPCV20-00982 | Dismissed | Plaintiffs, the Trump campaign and the Georgia Republican Party, alleged late ballots were illegally counted. Dismissed on November 5, 2020. | |
| November 11, 2020 | Brooks v. Mahoney | U.S. District Court for the Southern District of Georgia (Savannah Division) | 4:20-cv-00281-RSB-CLR | Dropped | Plaintiffs claimed software glitch caused a miscount of votes. Voluntarily dismissed on November 16, 2020. | |
| November 13, 2020 | Wood v. Raffensperger | U.S. District Court for the Northern District of Georgia | 1:20-cv-04651-SD | Denied | Lawsuit challenging the inclusion of absentee ballots for the general election in Georgia. November 19: Temporary Restraining Order (TRO) request to halt certification was Denied as plaintiff Wood lacks standing and his constitutional rights arguments fail. December 5: United States Court of Appeals for the Eleventh Circuit affirmed the denial of Wood's motion for emergency relief. Motion filed, for an expedited consideration for a writ of certiorari at the Supreme Court of the United States, denied by the Supreme Court on February 22, 2021 | |
| November 27, 2020 | Pearson v. Kemp | U.S. District Court for the Northern District of Georgia | 1:20-cv-04809-TCB | Dismissed, Appeal dropped | Litigated by Sidney Powell. Dismissed on December 7, 2020, for lack of jurisdiction, lack of standing, laches, and unavailability of relief. Appeal to the United States Court of Appeals for the Eleventh Circuit filed on December 7, 2020, voluntarily dismissed on January 20, 2021. Emergency petition for extraordinary writ of mandamus filed in the United States Supreme Court on December 11, 2020, voluntarily dismissed on January 19, 2021. | |
| November 30, 2020 | Boland v. Raffensperger | Superior Court of Fulton County, Georgia | 2020CV343018 | Dismissed | Plaintiff claimed state election officials failed to follow election code, and sought audit of ballots or to block certification of election. Dismissed on December 8, 2020. | |
| December 4, 2020 | Trump v. Raffensperger | Superior Court of Fulton County, Georgia Supreme Court of Georgia | 2020CV343255 (Sup. Ct. of Fulton Cty.) S21M0561 (Sup. Ct. of Ga.) | Dropped, Certiorari denied | Lawsuit filed on December 4, 2020 in Superior Court of Fulton County. Emergency petition for writ of certiorari filed with the Supreme Court of Georgia on December 11; certiorari unanimously denied on December 12, 2020. Voluntarily dismissed on January 7, 2021. | |
| December 23, 2020 | Favorito et al. v. Fulton County et al. | Superior Court of Fulton County | 2020CV343938 | Dismissed | Plaintiff sought inspection of absentee ballots for potential counterfeits. Dismissed for lack of standing on October 13, 2021. | |
| December 31, 2020 | Trump v. Kemp et al. | United States District Court, Northern District of Georgia, Atlanta Division | 1:20-cv-05310 | Dropped | Plaintiff claimed election fraud and requested declaratory and injunctive relief amounting to the voiding of the Presidential Election in 2020 and decertification of the Georgia slate of Presidential Electors. Voluntarily dismissed on January 7, 2021. | |
| August 14, 2023 | The State of Georgia v. Donald J. Trump, et al. | Fulton County Superior Court | 23SC188947 (indictment) | Dropped | A criminal case against Donald Trump and 18 co-defendants, alleging that Trump led a "criminal racketeering enterprise" in which he and all other defendants "knowingly and willfully joined a conspiracy to unlawfully change the outcome" of the 2020 U.S. presidential election in Georgia. | |

== In re: Enforcement of Election Laws and Securing Ballots Cast or Received after 7:00pm on November 3, 2020 ==
The lawsuit, regarding 53 ballots, was filed by the Trump campaign and the Georgia Republican Party on November 4 in the Chatham County Superior Court of the Eastern Judicial Circuit of Georgia. The campaign claimed that two witnesses had seen late ballots being improperly mixed with on-time ballots. Superior Court Judge James F. Bass Jr. denied the request and dismissed the suit on November 5, after hearing testimony from the chairman of the Chatham County Board of Registrars. The judge ruled that no evidence had been produced that the ballots were late.

== Brooks v. Mahoney ==
On November 11, 2020, four voters in Georgia sued Thomas Mahoney, Chairman of the Chatham County Board of Elections, in federal district court. The voters claimed a software glitch caused a miscounting of votes, and asked the court to stop certain counties from certifying their presidential election results. On November 16, the plaintiffs voluntarily dismissed the case.

== Wood v. Raffensperger ==
The lawsuit was filed by L. Lin Wood Jr. on November 13 in the United States District Court for the Northern District of Georgia. The plaintiff claimed that the balloting result in Georgia was defective and should be either invalidated or modified (i.e. having cured absentee ballots removed) because Georgia Secretary of State Brad Raffensperger and other government officials had no statutory authority to change election law to relax signature match requirement or to allow curing of absentee ballots. These changes to the voting process were introduced as the result of a settlement of an earlier lawsuit with the Democratic Party of Georgia on March 6, 2020. An amended complaint was filed on November 16, 2020, to include additional complaints about the automatic recount process.

On November 19, Judge Steven Grimberg ruled that Wood lacked legal standing to bring the case, had brought it too late, and had not advanced arguments that were likely to win the case. The judge stated that Wood failed to show that he had been harmed, while his proposal would "harm the public in countless ways". The Trump-appointed judge concluded that there was "no basis in fact or in law" to stop Georgia's certification of its election results (in which Joe Biden defeated Donald Trump) at such a late stage, as this would "breed confusion and potential disenfranchisement".

On December 5, a three-judge panel on the United States Court of Appeals for the Eleventh Circuit unanimously affirmed the district court's decision, because Wood "fails to allege a particularized injury", and in any case, his request to delay certification was moot because Georgia had by then already certified its election results.

On December 11, Wood filed the case with the Supreme Court, which denied the petition on February 22, 2021.

== Pearson v. Kemp ==
On November 25, 2020, a group of voters led by teenage conservative activist CJ Pearson sued Brian Kemp, the governor of Georgia, and other state officials. The plaintiffs claimed that the use of Dominion Voting Systems, a company that provides voting software and hardware across the U.S., violated state and federal law, and that Dominion was "founded by foreign oligarchs and dictators to ensure computerized ballot-stuffing and vote manipulation to whatever level was needed to make certain Venezuelan dictator Hugo Chávez never lost another election." The plaintiffs alleged that Dominion was used to rig votes for Joe Biden, and asked the court to stop the certification of elections results and order Governor Kemp to certify President Donald Trump as the winner in Georgia. This so-called "Kraken" lawsuit, along with King v. Whitmer, was filed in federal court by conservative lawyer Sidney Powell. The evidence included an affidavit from QAnon activist Ron Watkins, who stated, based his reading of an online user guide for Dominion Voting Systems software, that election fraud might be "within the realm of possibility".

Dominion responded publicly with a point-by-point rebuttal of the claims, calling them "baseless, senseless, [and] physically impossible."

A hearing was held on November 29, after which U.S. District Judge Timothy Batten ordered Cobb, Gwinnett, and Cherokee counties to preserve their voting machines and refrain from resetting them; he declined to immediately grant a request by the defendants to order a forensic examination of the voting machines. Both parties filed an interlocutory appeal of that decision with the U.S. Court of Appeals for the Eleventh Circuit (Case No. 20-14480). On December 4, the Eleventh Circuit dismissed the appeals, reasoning that the appellate court did not have jurisdiction to hear the appeal.

Shortly after this ruling, Judge Batten held a hearing in the district court for December 7, to address the plaintiff's request to inspect ballot machines; he dismissed the case from the bench that day The judge ruled that the plaintiffs did not have legal standing to bring the case, filed the case too late (as the Dominion machines were adopted months earlier), and filed the case in the wrong venue (of which the right venue would be a state court). In any case, the relief sought by Powell, which was to decertify Georgia's election results, was impossible to grant, stated the judge.

On December 8, the plaintiffs filed an appeal (Case No. 20-14579) of Batten's decision in the U.S. Court of Appeals for the Eleventh Circuit.

US Supreme Court Docket No. 20-816 (In Re Coreco Ja'Qan Pearson, et al., Petitioners)

* December 11, 2020: Petition for a writ of mandamus filed. (Response due January 14, 2021)

* December 15, 2020: Supplemental Brief of Coreco Ja'Qan Pearson, et al. submitted.

* December 18, 2020: Motion to Consolidate and Expedite Consideration of the Emergency Petition and, to Expedite Merits Briefing and Oral Argument in the Event that the Court Grants the Petition, and to Expedite Consideration of this Motion of Coreco Ja'Qan Pearson, et al. submitted.

* January 11, 2021: Motion to expedite consideration filed by petitioners DENIED

* January 19, 2021: Joint Stipulation to Dismiss Appeal of Coreco Ja'Qan Pearson, et al. submitted.

== Boland v. Raffensperger ==
On November 30, 2020, a Georgia voter, Paul Andrew Boland, sued state election officials in state court. Boland alleged that the defendants failed to follow the election code based on a low ballot rejection rate for signature mismatch; he also alleged that about 20,000 people who do not live in Georgia voted there. Boland asked the court for an audit of the ballots, or to otherwise decertify the state's election results. In court, the defense disagreed that signature matching was done improperly and argued that voters have legitimate reasons to temporarily move out of Georgia.

The suit was dismissed by Superior Court Judge Emily K. Richardson, who said that the plaintiff lacked standing, failed to state a claim, and that the suit was not filed in a timely manner or against the correct parties. Boland appealed to the Supreme Court of Georgia, which rejected the requests in his petition.

== Trump v. Raffensperger ==
On December 4, 2020, the Trump campaign filed a lawsuit against state election officials in the Superior Court of Fulton County. The plaintiffs alleged multiple violations of Georgia's election code and state constitution, and claimed thousands of illegitimate votes were cast. As a remedy, the plaintiffs asked the court to nullify the results of the election and order a new one. The filing was initially rejected due to the plaintiff's failure to pay the filing fee and complete the prerequisite paperwork, but was corrected later that day.

Trump, joined by Georgia Republican Party Chairman David Shafer, filed an appeal (Note: Ga. Sup. Ct. Case No. S21M0561.) with the Supreme Court of Georgia on December 11, asking it to hear the case within the next three days (i.e. before the Electoral College voted); the next day, the Court unanimously declined to hear the case, with Justice Harold Melton finding that "petitioners have not shown that this is one of those extremely rare cases that would invoke our original jurisdiction".

On January 7, 2021, the petitioners filed to have the case voluntarily dismissed.

== Favorito et al. v. Fulton County et al. ==
A lawsuit was filed December 23, 2020, which primarily sought to have absentee ballots be subjected to additional inspections for potential counterfeits, and the defendants were required to produce ballots for additional inspection by the plaintiffs during the course of the case. The case was eventually dismissed on October 13, 2021, for lack of standing.

On December 20, 2022, the Georgia Supreme Court reversed the dismissal. On February 5, 2026, the Fulton County Superior Court dismissed the case because it "presented zero factual or legal questions". He also ordered the plaintiffs to reimburse the defendant's legal expenses.

== Trump v. Kemp et al. ==
Trump v. Kemp et al. was filed on December 31, 2020, three days before the phone call at the center of the Trump–Raffensperger scandal. The motion for a preliminary injunction was denied following a hearing on Jan 5.

On January 7, 2021, Trump voluntarily dismissed the lawsuit, citing a "settlement agreement". Raffensperger disputes any such "settlement agreement" was obtained, but did not oppose the voluntary dismissal.

"Rather than presenting their evidence and witnesses to a court and to cross-examination under oath, the Trump campaign wisely decided the smartest course was to dismiss their frivolous cases," Raffensperger said.

== The State of Georgia v. Donald J. Trump, et al. ==
The State of Georgia v. Donald J. Trump, et al. was a criminal case against Donald Trump and 18 co-defendants. All defendants were charged with one count of violating Georgia's Racketeer Influenced and Corrupt Organizations (RICO) statute, and the defendants were also variously charged with forty additional counts from other allegations, including: Trump and co-defendants plotted to create pro-Trump slates of fake electors; Trump called the Georgia Secretary of State, Brad Raffensperger, asking him to "find 11,780 votes", which would have reversed his loss in the state by a single vote margin; and a small group of Trump allies in Coffee County, Georgia illegally accessed voting systems attempting to find evidence of election fraud.

A grand jury handed up the indictments on August 14, 2023, following an investigation launched in February 2021 by Fulton County district attorney Fani Willis. Four defendants pled guilty to some of the charges and agreed to cooperate with the prosecution, and the rest pled not guilty.

Responding to Trump's victory in 2024 United States presidential election, a prosecutor who took over the case dropped the remaining charges on November 26, 2025 due to the impossibility of bringing a sitting president to trial in a speedy manner and the difficulty in separating the co-conspirator charges from Trump's.
