= Trump–Raffensperger phone call =

2021 American political scandal

- Part of the attempts to overturn the 2020 United States presidential election
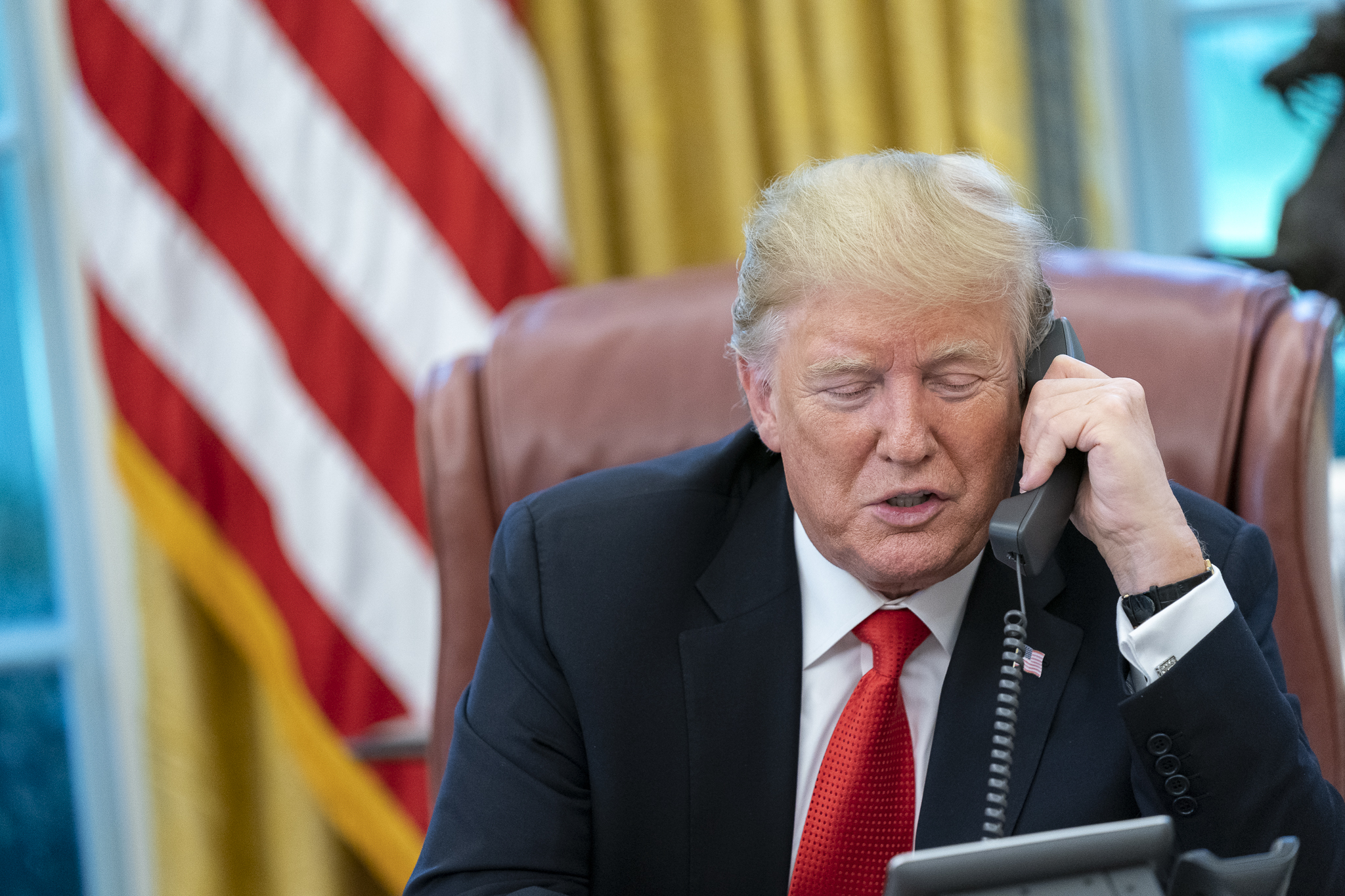
- President Donald Trump on the Oval Office phone in 2019
- Date: January 2, 2021
- Duration: 1 hour
- Motive: Pressuring Raffensperger to find 11,780 votes and overturn Trump's loss in the 2020 presidential election
- Perpetrator: Donald Trump
- Outcome: Refusal by Raffensperger to alter vote counts Second impeachment of Donald Trump; Third and fourth indictments of Donald Trump
- Arrests: Donald Trump, Mark Meadows
- Charges: Solicitation of public officer (within broader RICO)

On January 2, 2021, during an hour-long conference call, U.S. president Donald Trump pressured Georgia secretary of state Brad Raffensperger to "find 11,780 votes" and overturn the U.S. election results from the 2020 presidential election. Trump had been defeated by Joe Biden in the election, but refused to accept the outcome, and made a months-long effort to overturn the results. Prior to the call to Raffensperger, Trump and his campaign spoke repeatedly to state and local officials in at least three states in which he had lost, urging them to recount votes, throw out some ballots, or replace the Democratic slate of electors with a Republican slate. Trump's call with Raffensperger was released by The Washington Post and other media outlets the next day, after Trump made a statement about the call on Twitter.

According to the publicly released recording of the call and reports made by multiple news agencies, Trump attempted to pressure Raffensperger into reinvestigating the election results, despite being repeatedly told that there was no electoral error. Trump's repeated efforts to convince Raffensperger to find some basis to overturn the election results were perceived as pleading and threatening. At one point on the call, Trump told Raffensperger, "What I want to do is this. I just want to find, uh, 11,780 votes, which is one more than we have, because we won the state." During the call, Trump falsely suggested that Raffensperger could have committed a criminal offense by refusing to overturn the state's election results. Legal experts have suggested that Trump's behavior and demands could have violated state and federal laws.

On January 11, the phone call was cited in the article of impeachment in the second impeachment of Donald Trump introduced in the House of Representatives. Raffensperger's office opened a fact-finding and administrative investigation of potential election interference regarding Trump's efforts to overturn the results in Georgia, and Fulton County prosecutors opened a criminal investigation in February of the same year. On August 14, 2023, Trump, along with 18 co-defendants, was indicted in Fulton County on charges including racketeering and fraud. The phone call was a central element of the indictment.

== Background ==
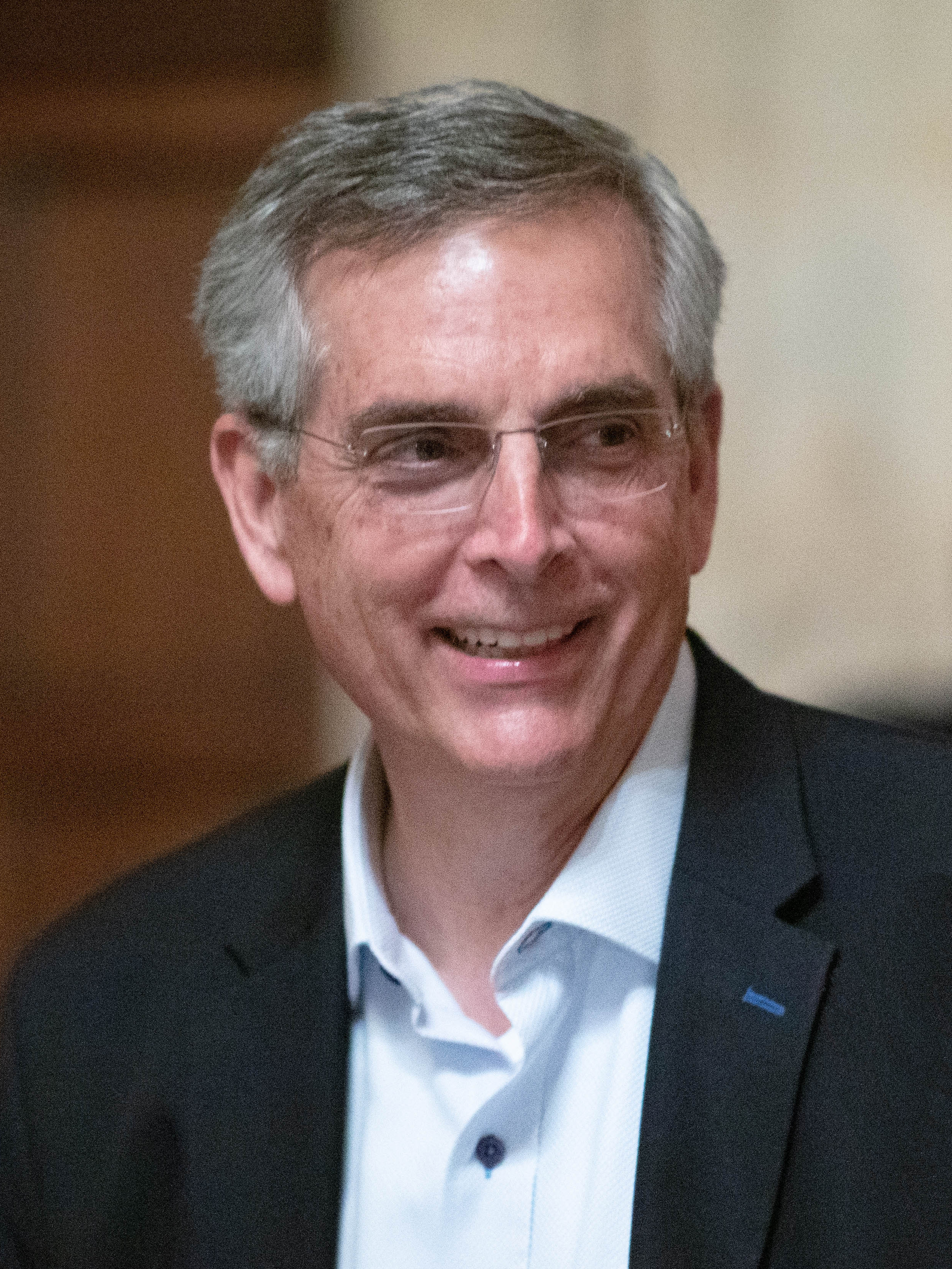
Brad Raffensperger (left) and Donald Trump (right)

In the 2020 United States presidential election, former Vice President Joe Biden defeated incumbent President Donald Trump. Trump and his campaign falsely claimed that voting fraud had cost him electoral victory in several states, including Georgia. Trump's claims were rejected and found to be baseless by numerous state and federal judges, elected officials, governors, and government agencies, including his own administration's Cybersecurity and Infrastructure Security Agency (CISA). Trump's attempts to overturn the election cost taxpayers $519 million according to an analysis by The Washington Post, including $488 million in security fees during and after the U.S. Capitol attack, and $2.2 million in legal fees.

Trump's many legal challenges to the election results were unsuccessful, but he repeatedly refused to accept the outcome of the election. Audits and hand recounts revealed no evidence of fraud or any irregularity that would have changed the election results. Biden was officially confirmed the winner of Georgia on November 19.

In November and December, as his lawsuits were repeatedly rejected in court, Trump personally communicated with Republican local and state officials in at least three states: Michigan, Pennsylvania, and Georgia. He talked in person or via phone to state legislators, state attorneys general, and governors, pressuring them to recount the votes, throw out some of the ballots, or get the state legislature to replace the elected Democratic slate of Electoral College members with a Republican slate of electors chosen by the legislature in order to overturn the election results in their states. In December he spoke by phone to the governor of Georgia, Brian Kemp, and made public demands on the secretary of state, Brad Raffensperger, both Republicans who had supported Trump in the election. He demanded that they reverse the Georgia election results, threatened them with political retaliation when they did not, strongly criticized them in speeches and tweets, and tweeted that Kemp should resign.

=== December 23 phone call with chief elections investigator ===
On December 23, 2020, Trump called the chief investigator for the Georgia secretary of state's office, who was then conducting a ballot audit in Cobb County. Raffensperger had ordered the audit in response to allegations of fraud. Trump asked her to scrutinize the ballots and said she would find "dishonesty". The Washington Post reported on the telephone conversation with apparent quotations of Trump's comments to the chief investigator. It based these quotations on an anonymous source purportedly familiar with the call. At the time of its reporting, it emphasized that Trump had instructed the investigator to "find the fraud" and that she would be a "national hero" if she did so. Based on this reporting, some legal experts said that this phone call appeared to be bribery or obstruction on Trump's part. On December 29, the audit ended. Georgia officials concluded that there was no fraud. Trump was unhappy with those results.

Secretary of State Raffensperger acknowledged Trump's December 23 phone call to the chief investigator during a Good Morning America interview on January 4. The Washington Post revealed more details of the phone call on January 9, but did not reveal the name of the chief investigator to protect that person's safety. Other news outlets published similar stories and stated that they had corroborated the story with their own investigations. In the second impeachment against Trump, House managers specifically cited the purported statements to the Georgia investigator as part of the evidence supporting the call for impeachment in their trial brief presented to the United States Senate.

In March 2021, in the course of the criminal investigation by Fulton County District Attorney Fani Willis into Trump's attempt to overturn the November 3 election, investigators obtained the audio recording made by the individual Trump was speaking to, from her computer. In response to a public records request, officials made the audio recording available to the press. The Wall Street Journal obtained and published the transcript of the phone call and revealed that the underlying sourcing for the Washington Post reporting, the quotations provided by the anonymous source, was fake. The recording indicated that Trump had emphasized to the investigator that Fulton County and its votes should be the object of scrutiny, but had never told the investigator to "find the fraud" or that the investigator would be a "national hero". Following the Associated Press's reporting of the discovery of the recording, The Washington Post issued a correction to its original article, as did other outlets such as The Hill and the Associated Press. In its correction, the Post said that Trump had been "misquoted". The quotes by Trump were corrected to "[you would] find things that are gonna be unbelievable" and "when the right answer comes out, you'll be praised".

== January 2 taped conversation with Raffensperger ==
On January 2, 2021, Trump held a one-hour phone call with Raffensperger. Trump was joined by chief of staff Mark Meadows, trade adviser Peter Navarro, Justice Department official John Lott, law professor John C. Eastman, and attorneys Rudy Giuliani, Cleta Mitchell, Alex Kaufman, and Kurt Hilbert. Raffensperger was joined by his general counsel Ryan Germany. Jordan Fuchs, a Republican operative and chief of staff to Brad Raffensperger, while listening on mute, recorded the phone conversation, while visiting her grandparents in Florida.

On January 3, The Washington Post and other media outlets obtained a recording of this phone conversation.

During the phone call, Trump maintained falsely that he had won Georgia by "hundreds of thousands of votes", insisting that the certified election results were wrong. He said that Raffensperger should "reevaluate" the election's results, citing a variety of different conspiracy theories regarding voting in the state. Raffensperger, in response, answered that the election results in that state were correct and legitimate, and that Trump "had got his data wrong". During his attempts to pressure Raffensperger into changing the election results, Trump said, "I just want to find 11,780 votes", the minimum number needed to overcome Biden's advantage in Georgia. Trump also tried to intimidate Raffensperger, hinting that Raffensperger and his attorney could face a possible criminal investigation. Trump said, "You know, that's a criminal offense. And you know, you can't let that happen. That's a big risk to you."

After the Georgia call, Trump and his team spoke on Zoom with officials in Arizona, Michigan, Pennsylvania, and Wisconsin.

=== Release of the tape ===
On January 3 Trump said on Twitter that he had spoken to Raffensperger and that Raffensperger was "unwilling or unable to answer questions" about alleged election fraud and that he "has no clue". Later that day, the recording of the conversation was released to The Washington Post and other media outlets; a local television station said they had obtained it from "government sources".

Raffensperger said he had not initially intended to release the tape, but felt compelled to respond after Trump misrepresented the call on Twitter. He added that the call had been hastily arranged after Trump saw Raffensperger say on Fox News that morning that the election had been fair and honest and that Trump had lost. It was later reported that the White House had made 18 attempts over the previous weeks to get the secretary of state's office on the phone. Raffensperger said he had preferred not to take such calls because his office was in "litigation mode" with the White House, and both sides would need to have their advisers present.

=== Raffensperger's legal rights ===
Some commentators raised legal concerns regarding Raffensperger's recording and disclosing his phone call with Trump; far right-wing media such as The Gateway Pundit, a prominent conspiracy theory website, specifically wrote that Raffensperger might face an espionage charge. PolitiFact cited legal experts that the content of the phone call was not covered by the Espionage Act, as the conversation had nothing to do with national security.

While there were rumors about a possible lawsuit against Raffensperger for recording the conversation without Trump's consent, the telephone call recording laws for both locations where this conversation was held, namely the state of Georgia and District of Columbia, only require "one-party consent", meaning any participant of a phone call can legally record it without another party's consent. As the conversation was hastily arranged, Raffensperger said that the parties did not establish any non-disclosure agreement before or during the phone call.

== Investigations ==
Legal experts said Trump's attempt to pressure Raffensperger could have violated election law, including federal and state laws against soliciting election fraud or interference in elections. Election-law scholar Edward B. Foley called Trump's conduct "inappropriate and contemptible" while the executive director of Citizens for Responsibility and Ethics in Washington called Trump's attempt "to rig a presidential election ... a low point in American history and unquestionably impeachable conduct."

According to The Guardian, Trump might have committed a crime by attempting to pressure Raffensperger, as he might have been "knowingly attempting to coerce state officials into corrupting the integrity of the election", said professor of Constitutional Law Richard Pildes. According to Michael Bromwich, Trump might have violated Title 52 of the United States Code when he said "I just want to find 11,780 votes", as reported in The Guardian. Raffensperger has said the calls from Trump to him and other officials could be reason for an investigation into possible conflicts of interest.

In March 2022, a federal judge cited the phone call when ruling that Trump ally John Eastman's emails could be turned over to the U.S. House Select Committee on the January 6th Attack. Since Trump's request of Raffensperger had been "obvious" in its "illegality", the judge wrote, Eastman's correspondence related to this topic appears to discuss how to help Trump commit a crime, and therefore Eastman is not entitled to the privacy granted by attorney–client privilege.

=== Federal ===
On January 4, 2021, Democratic congressional leaders, believing Trump "engaged in solicitation of, or conspiracy to commit, a number of election crimes", requested the FBI to investigate the incident. In addition, while some House Republicans tried to defend Trump's Georgia call, Democrats began drafting a censure resolution. After the U.S. Capitol attack, Democrats launched a drive to impeach Trump for "Incitement of Insurrection".

The draft article of impeachment, as well as the final version, cited the January 2 phone call to Raffensperger:

President Trump's conduct on January 6, 2021, followed his prior efforts to subvert and obstruct the certification of the results of the 2020 Presidential election. Those prior efforts included a phone call on January 2, 2021, during which President Trump urged the secretary of state of Georgia, Brad Raffensperger, to "find" enough votes to overturn the Georgia Presidential election results and threatened Secretary Raffensperger if he failed to do so.

Trump's attorneys in the impeachment trial addressed the Georgia phone call as follows:

It is denied that the word "find" was inappropriate in context, as President Trump was expressing his opinion that if the evidence was carefully examined one would "find that you have many that aren't even signed and you have many that are forgeries."

Lacking sufficient support from Republican senators to meet the two-thirds majority threshold, the impeachment trial acquitted Trump on February 13.

=== State ===
In early January 2021, Fulton County District Attorney Fani T. Willis said that she found the phone call with Trump and Raffensperger "disturbing" and said a Democratic appointee from the State Election Board had requested that the Secretary's Elections Division investigate the call, after which the Board would refer the case to the office and the state Attorney General.

On February 9, Raffensperger's office opened an investigation of potential election interference in Trump's efforts to overturn the results in Georgia, including the phone call, a step that could lead to a criminal investigation by state and local authorities.

District Attorney Willis launched a criminal investigation on February 10 to enable her to decide whether to prosecute Trump. Her team includes former Georgia special prosecutor John E. Floyd, considered a "national authority on racketeering". Willis said in February that no Georgia official was currently a target of the investigation, but in September, she announced that state election officials were among the witnesses her team was interviewing. Subpoenas, if needed to gain information from uncooperative witnesses, had not yet been issued by September.

On November 6, reporting emerged that Willis was likely to impanel a special grand jury, which would allow her to proceed with the investigation more efficiently, as those jurors would be dedicated to the case. However, even if she obtained subpoenas, she would still be required to return to a regular grand jury for an indictment. (There was a county-wide backlog of over 10,000 cases due to the COVID-19 pandemic.) On January 20, 2022, Willis sent a letter to Fulton County Superior Court Chief Judge Christopher S. Brasher to request permission to convene a special grand jury, stating that there was a "reasonable probability" Georgia's election process in 2020 "was subject to possible criminal disruptions". This request was subsequently granted on January 24 by a majority of judges on the court, and the grand jurors were selected on May 2. Raffensperger's office was subpoenaed for documents, and Raffensperger, five of his staff members, and State Attorney General Chris Carr were subpoenaed to appear in June.

Willis' investigation focuses on Trump's phone call to Raffensperger and other attempts by Trump to influence Georgia officials, including the attorney general of Georgia and the governor. The investigation is also examining a November 13, 2020, phone call by Senator Lindsey Graham to Raffensperger in which Graham tried to influence the election result. Trump himself may have provided additional incriminating information when he publicly said at a September 25, 2021, rally in Perry, Georgia, that he had asked Governor Kemp to "help us out and call a special election". On May 2, 2022, an updated overview of the related legal details and circumstances was reported in The New York Times.

On July 5, 2022, the special grand jury issued subpoenas for Lindsey Graham, Rudy Giuliani, John Eastman, Cleta Mitchell, Kenneth Chesebro and Jenna Ellis.

On January 9, 2023, the grand jury completed its investigation giving District Attorney Fani Willis the decision to file any criminal charges. A hearing was scheduled for January 24 to address if any portions of the report will be released to the public by an order dissolving the grand jury by Fulton County Judge Robert McBurney.

== Reactions ==
The day after the Trump call was disclosed, Republican Georgia voting system implementation manager Gabriel Sterling sharply refuted Trump's claims of election fraud during a press conference with Raffensperger, listing and debunking several allegations made by Trump and his allies that thousands of teenagers, dead people, and unregistered citizens had voted, and a misleading video that had been distributed supposedly showing fake ballots being secretly retrieved from suitcases. Sterling said, "The president's legal team had the entire tape, they watched the entire tape, and from our point of view, intentionally misled the state's senate, voters and the people of the United States about this. It was intentional. It was obvious. And anybody watching this knows that."

Carl Bernstein, one of the investigative journalists who revealed the Watergate scandal, said the allegations were "far worse than Watergate" and called the recording of the phone call "the ultimate smoking gun tape". U.S. Representative Hank Johnson has called it "a violation of state and federal law", while Senator Dick Durbin has said it "merits nothing less than a criminal investigation." House Democrats were reported to be drafting a censure resolution. The Washington Post called it "extraordinary" that a sitting U.S. president would attempt to pressure a Secretary of a U.S. state into changing the votes of a state. David Worley, the Democratic appointee to the State Elections Board and a former Democratic Party of Georgia chairman, called for a criminal probe into Trump's actions, stating that Trump had solicited election fraud, constituting a violation of state law.

Democrats condemned Trump's conduct. Vice President-elect Kamala Harris, as well as Representative Adam Schiff (the chief prosecutor at Trump's first impeachment trial) said that Trump's attempt to pressure Raffensperger was an abuse of power. Dick Durbin, the second highest-ranking Democrat in the Senate, called for a criminal investigation. On January 4, 2021, Democratic U.S. Representatives Ted Lieu and Kathleen Rice sent a letter to FBI Director Christopher Wray asking him to open a criminal investigation of the incident, writing that they believed Trump had solicited, or conspired to commit, "a number of election crimes." More than 90 House Democrats support a formal censure resolution, introduced by Representative Hank Johnson of Georgia, to "censure and condemn" Trump for having "misused the power of his office by threatening an elected official with vague criminal consequences if he failed to pursue the president's false claims" and for attempting "to willfully deprive the citizens of Georgia of a fair and impartial election process in direct contravention" of state and federal law. Some congressional Democrats called Trump's conduct an impeachable offense.

Several House and Senate Republicans also condemned Trump's conduct, although no Republican described the conduct as criminal or an impeachable offense. Republican Senator Pat Toomey called it a "new low in this whole futile and sorry episode" and commended "Republican election officials across the country who have discharged their duties with integrity over the past two months while weathering relentless pressure, disinformation, and attacks from the president and his campaign." Other congressional Republicans defended Trump's Georgia call, including House Minority Leader Kevin McCarthy and Georgia Senator David Perdue, who told Fox News in an interview that he thinks releasing the tape of the call was "disgusting."

Raffensperger tweeted that "the truth will come out" regarding the incident. On January 4, Raffensperger confirmed the phone conversation during an interview that aired on Good Morning America. He said, "I'm not a lawyer. All I know is that we're going to follow the law, follow the process. Truth matters. And we've been fighting these rumors for the last two months."

Republican legislators within the Georgia State Senate attempted to interfere in the Fulton County District Attorney's investigation of the phone call by introducing a constitutional amendment which would have mandated the calling of a state-wide grand jury to investigate election crimes instead of a regular county-wide grand jury. According to numerous reports, this would force the District Attorney to summon grand jurors from more conservative, rural counties as well as dilute the diversity of the members present. However, due to the Republicans lacking a two-thirds majority in both houses of the Georgia General Assembly, the resolution was considered unlikely to pass. In April 2022, the legislative session ended without the resolution having been enacted.

== Graham phone call to Raffensperger ==
During the hand recount of all ballots of the state of Georgia between November 11 and 20, 2020, Republican Senator of South Carolina, Lindsey Graham, privately called Raffensperger about the audit. Raffensperger concluded that Graham intended to ask him to throw out all legal mail-in ballots and described that he felt "threatened" during the conversation, which Graham denied. The Washington Post reported in February 2021 that the Fulton County district attorney was examining Graham's phone call to Raffensperger as part of a criminal investigation into possible efforts to overturn the Georgia election results.

== See also ==
- Hello Garci scandal, a similar scandal in the Philippines that took place in 2005
- Public hearings of the United States House Select Committee on the January 6 Attack
