= Trump: The Criminal Conspiracy Case =

- Directed by: Marian Mohamed

Production
- Producer: Jecca Powell
- Production company: 72 Films

Original release
- Release: 2024

Trump: The Criminal Conspiracy Case is a 2024 British documentary film about the Georgia election racketeering prosecution.

== Reception ==
The film was widely reviewed in the British press.
