= Pete Skandalakis =

American prosecuting attorney

Peter J. Skandalakis (born 1955 or 1956) is an American lawyer. He is the executive director of the Prosecuting Attorneys' Council of Georgia and was previously the district attorney for the five-county Coweta judicial circuit for 25 years. In November 2025, after the removal of Fani Willis from the racketeering case against President Donald Trump and several of his associates on charges of attempting to overturn the result of the 2020 United States Presidential election in Georgia, Skandalakis took over as prosecutor and when hearings began asked the judge to dismiss all charges, ending the case.

== Early life and education ==
Skandalakis was born in Atlanta, and grew up near the Little Five Points neighborhood, where his father, John Skandalakis, ran a convenience store. His parents were both immigrants from Greece, although his mother was born in New York; Mitch Skandalakis is his cousin. He has three siblings. He graduated from Northside High School, then earned a bachelor's degree in political science, a master's degree in public policy, and a Juris Doctor degree from the University of Georgia.

== Career ==
After completing law school in 1984, Skandalakis became an assistant district attorney (prosecutor) in the office of the district attorney for the Coweta judicial circuit, which encompasses Carroll, Coweta, Heard, Meriwether, and Troup counties. He was promoted to chief assistant district attorney in 1987. In 1991 he was appointed district attorney by Governor Zell Miller, and in 1992 he was elected to the position. He prosecuted many murder cases as district attorney, including that of Tina Resch, in 1994, that of a teenage Natural Born Killers copycat murderer, in 1995, and that of a man from Schenectady, New York for killing a police officer during a traffic stop, in 2001. He was named Georgia District Attorney of the Year in 2007.

He announced his resignation in December 2017 and in January 2018 became executive director of the Prosecuting Attorneys' Council of Georgia. In August 2021, he was appointed as district attorney pro tempore to prosecute the case of two police officers accused in the killing of Rayshard Brooks; in August 2022 he announced that he would not be bringing charges against either officer. At the press conference, he presented a detailed reconstruction of the sequence of events based on the video and audio recordings.

=== State racketeering case against Donald Trump and associates ===
In August 2023, Fani Willis, the district attorney for Fulton County, Georgia, the county including most of the state capital of Atlanta, indicted then former President Donald Trump and 18 associates under the Georgia state anti-racketeering act, charging them with attempting to attempting to overturn the result of the 2020 United States Presidential election in Georgia, in which Joe Biden defeated Trump in his bid for re-election. She had originally intended also to indict the state lieutenant governor, Burt Jones, for acting as a fake elector, but in 2022 a judge barred her from doing so on grounds of conflict of interest. As head of the Prosecuting Attorneys' Council of Georgia, Skandalakis was responsible for finding a replacement prosecutor for the case against Jones. In 2024, he chose to appoint himself, and five months later, in September 2024, decided not to prosecute him. He gave as his reasons that: "The evidence reveals Senator Jones acted in a manner consistent with his position representing the concerns of his constituents and in reliance upon the advice of attorneys" and that Jones "did not act with criminal intent".

Four of the accused pleaded guilty to lesser charges. In December 2024, Willis was removed on different conflict-of-interest grounds from the case against Trump (who had been re-elected the previous month) and the 14 remaining co-defendants, including his former lawyer Rudy Giuliani and the former White House chief of staff Mark Meadows, and in September 2025 the Georgia Supreme Court declined to hear her appeal. Again responsible as head of the Prosecuting Attorneys' Council of Georgia for finding a replacement prosecutor, Skandalakis initially requested a time extension, and in November stated that no one had been willing and appointed himself. Court hearings began in late November 2025, and Skandalakis filed a brief with the presiding judge to have the case dismissed, ending the last criminal case against President Trump. His rationale was that Trump could not be tried as a sitting president, could not be detached from the case since he was the lead defendant, and by the time the case could be brought to trial following the end of his term in January 2029, his co-defendants would have been deprived of their right to a speedy trial. He also argued that a federal case would have been more appropriate and that "In my professional opinion, the citizens of Georgia are not served by pursuing this case in full for another five to ten years."

Trump and the other defendants in the abandoned case subsequently sued the office of the Fulton County District Attorney seeking reimbursement of attorney fees and costs under a 2025 Georgia state law applying to cases that are dismissed after disqualification of the prosecutor. Skandalakis said that the law was potentially unconstitutional because of its lack of provision for due process for the counties.

== Personal life ==
Skandalakis and his wife Mary have six children. He was a Democrat at the beginning of his career, but later won re-election as a Republican.
