= Beverly Hall =

Jamaican- American superintendent

Personal details
- Born: Beverly La-Forte Clare; July 7, 1946 Montego Bay, Jamaica
- Died: March 2, 2015 (aged 68)
- Party: Democratic
- Spouse: Luis Hall (m. 1973)
- Children: 1
- Education: Brooklyn College (BA); City University of New York (MA); Fordham University (EdD)

Beverly La-Forte Hall (née Clare; July 7, 1946 – March 2, 2015) was a Jamaican-American education administrator. She worked as the superintendent of schools in Queens, New York; Newark, New Jersey; and Atlanta, Georgia, where she was responsible for the Atlanta Public Schools cheating scandal but died before facing justice.

== Life and career ==
Hall was born Beverly La-Forte Clare in Montego Bay, Jamaica and graduated from Saint Andrew High School for Girls in Saint Andrew Parish. She moved to the United States for college and received her undergraduate degree from Brooklyn College in 1970. She then received a master's degree from the City University of New York. Hall received her Ed.D. from Fordham University in 1990. She began her education career in several Brooklyn public schools. She taught English at Junior High School 265, then served as coordinator of Satellite West Junior High School, principal of P.S. 282, and principal of J.H.S. 113 (now Ronald Edmonds Learning Center). While working as a Queens district superintendent in 1994, Hall was given "control of the city's high schools, special education programs and all other centrally controlled instructional programs" by Chancellor Ramon C. Cortines.

Hall served as superintendent of the Newark Public Schools from 1995 to 1999, being appointed after the state of New Jersey took over the school system. She was appointed superintendent of the Atlanta Public Schools from 1999 until her resignation in 2010. In 2009, the American Association of School Administrators named Hall as National Superintendent of the Year, mentioning Atlanta's "significant gains in student achievement over the past 10 years."

== Indictment ==
Hall was indicted on March 29, 2013, by a Fulton County, Georgia grand jury in relation to her role in the Atlanta Public Schools cheating scandal. She was charged with racketeering, making false statements, theft, influencing witnesses, and conspiracy. In the original report prior to the indictment, investigators accused Hall of creating "a culture of fear, intimidation and retaliation” that permitted "cheating — at all levels — to go unchecked for years”; she died before trial.

== Death ==
On March 2, 2015, Beverly Hall died of breast cancer, aged 68.
