= Georgia election racketeering prosecution =

RICO case against Donald Trump and others

State of Georgia v. Trump, et al.
- Court: Fulton County Superior Court
- Full case name: The State of Georgia v. Donald J. Trump, et al.
- Charge: List of charges: Violation of the Georgia RICO Act; Solicitation of violation of oath by public officer; False statements and writings; Conspiracy to commit false statements and writings; Criminal attempt to commit false statements and writings; Impersonating a public officer; Conspiracy to commit impersonating a public officer; Forgery in the first degree; Conspiracy to commit forgery in the first degree; Filing false documents; Conspiracy to commit filing false documents; Influencing witnesses; Criminal attempt to commit influencing witnesses; Conspiracy to commit election fraud; Conspiracy to commit computer theft; Conspiracy to commit computer trespass; Conspiracy to commit computer invasion of privacy; Conspiracy to defraud the state; Perjury
- Citation: 23SC188947 (indictment)

Case history
- Prior actions: Plea bargains (pre-trial): Hall: 5 years probation; Powell: 6 years probation; Chesebro: 5 years probation; Ellis: 5 years probation

Court membership
- Judge sitting: Scott F. McAfee

The State of Georgia v. Donald J. Trump, et al. was a criminal case against Donald Trump, the 45th and eventually-47th president of the United States, and 18 co-defendants. All defendants were charged with one count of violating Georgia's Racketeer Influenced and Corrupt Organizations (RICO) statute, which would have had a penalty of 5–20 years in prison. The indictment came in the context of Trump's broader effort to overturn his loss in the 2020 presidential election. The case was one of four criminal indictments against Trump, all charged in 2023.

Defendants were variously charged with 40 additional counts from other allegations, including: Trump and co-defendants plotted to create pro-Trump slates of fake electors; Trump called the Georgia secretary of state, Brad Raffensperger, asking him to "find 11,780 votes", which would have reversed his loss in the state by a single vote margin; and a small group of Trump allies in Coffee County illegally accessed voting systems attempting to find evidence of election fraud.

Following an investigation launched in February 2021 by Fulton County district attorney Fani Willis, a grand jury of 23 citizens handed up the indictments on August 14, 2023. Her prosecution alleged that Trump led a "criminal racketeering enterprise", in which he and all other defendants "knowingly and willfully joined a conspiracy to unlawfully change the outcome" of the 2020 U.S. presidential election in Georgia.

The case was set to be heard in the Fulton County Superior Court with judge Scott F. McAfee presiding. Former Trump chief of staff Mark Meadows, former Department of Justice (DOJ) official Jeffrey Clark, and three other defendants unsuccessfully sought to have their cases removed to federal court. Four defendants pleaded guilty to some charges, agreed to cooperate with the prosecution, and received sentences including probation, fines, and making public apologies.

After pausing the case, the Georgia Court of Appeals in December 2024 disqualified Willis from prosecuting it. In November 2025, Pete Skandalakis, executive director of the Prosecuting Attorneys' Council of Georgia, took on the role of prosecutor. Less than two weeks later, on November 26, he dropped all charges against all remaining defendants, ending the case.

== Background ==
=== Prior to and during election day ===
Weeks before the 2016 presidential election, Trump claimed through a series of tweets that widespread voter fraud was imminent, a sentiment echoed by his legal advisor, Rudy Giuliani. Trump repeated the accusations throughout his presidency and into his 2020 reelection campaign; for months, he prepared arguments in the event of his loss, primarily relating to mail-in ballots. As early as August 2020, he enlisted conservative activist and lawyer Cleta Mitchell to help overturn the election. Two days before Election Day (November 3, 2020), he told reporters that he would be "going in with [his] lawyers" as soon as the election was over.

On Election Day, preliminary surveys at polling places showed Trump in the lead as his supporters were more likely to turn out in person amid the COVID-19 pandemic, but his lead diminished as mail-in ballots were counted. At the behest of Giuliani, Trump declared in a 2 a.m. election night speech in the East Room that he had won the election and that the counts being reported were fraudulent. As ballots were being counted, campaign data expert Matt Oczkowski bluntly informed Trump that he was going to lose the election. White House Counsel Pat Cipollone told him that invalidating the results of the election would be a "murder-suicide pact". Under then-attorney general William Barr, the Department of Justice failed to find widespread voter fraud in the election.

Former speaker of the House Newt Gingrich predicted that Trump voters would erupt in "rage", a sentiment shared by House Republican leader Kevin McCarthy, who told Laura Ingraham on The Ingraham Angle that Republicans should "not be silent about this".

=== Efforts to pressure Georgia state officials ===
On December 3, 2020, a 7-hour hearing of the Georgia Senate Committee on the Judiciary heard Trump's legal team, including Rudy Giuliani and John Eastman, made false claims alleging fraud and misconduct in the state's election process, and that the Georgia legislature had the power to appoint electors for Trump. A similar presentation was made to the Georgia House of Representatives Committee on Governmental Relations.

On December 7, Trump called Georgia House Speaker David Ralston asking him to convene a special session of the state legislature to overturn the Georgia election results.

In late December 2020 and early January 2021, Jeffrey Clark, the Assistant Attorney General for the Environment and Natural Resources Division and acting for the DOJ Civil Division, drafted a letter to Georgia officials stating the DOJ had "identified significant concerns that may have impacted the outcome of the election in multiple States", urging the Georgia legislature to convene a special session for the "purpose of considering issues pertaining to the appointment of Presidential Electors". Clark presented the draft letter to acting attorney general Jeffrey Rosen and his deputy Richard Donoghue for their signatures; they rejected the proposal and the letter was never sent.

Trump pressured Georgia Secretary of State Brad Raffensperger to change the state's election results during an hour-long conference call on January 2, 2021. Trump told Raffensperger, "What I want to do is this. I just want to find, uh, 11,780 votes, which is one more than [the 11,779-vote margin of defeat] we have, because we won the state."

On September 17, Trump wrote to Raffensperger, alleging that 43,000 ballots in DeKalb County had been mishandled and that Raffensperger should "start the process of decertifying the election, or whatever the correct legal remedy is, and announce the true winner." In the 2023 Georgia indictment, the 38th and 39th counts address this act.

=== Creation of false electoral vote documents ===
The plan to recruit false electors for Donald Trump and pressure public officials to accept them was spearheaded by Rudy Giuliani and John Eastman in support of the Trump campaign and with the awareness of Trump himself, although other campaign staff expressed doubts about the plan. The plan led to false documents being produced in seven states: Arizona, Georgia, Michigan, Nevada, New Mexico, Pennsylvania, and Wisconsin.

As is typical, the 16 potential electors for Trump in Georgia were chosen before the election. After Biden won the election, and days before the scheduled casting of electoral votes, the Republican electors received calls asking them to come to the Georgia State Capitol to cast "alternate" ballots, ostensibly in case Texas v. Pennsylvania was ruled in favor of Trump. However, that case was thrown out on December 11, 2020, three days before the electoral vote was to occur, a fact that was withheld from most of the fake electors by Giuliani and Kenneth Chesebro. Four members of the Republican electoral slate declined to participate, including former U.S. Senator Johnny Isakson, and were replaced.

Georgia fake electors convened in a meeting room at the state Capitol at the same time the true electors were meeting in the state Senate chamber. State senator Shawn Still verified fake electors' identities as they entered the room, but the meeting was reportedly open to the public, and video was posted that day. Unlike some other states, the Georgia false certificate of ascertainment did not contain language specifying it was to be used only if the Trump campaign prevailed in litigation (one state case, Trump v. Raffensperger, was still pending at the time). The falsified documents were then sent to the U.S. Senate and the National Archives by Giuliani and Chesebro's team.

=== Coffee County election equipment breach ===
In the weeks after the election, Trump and his associates publicly disparaged electronic voting company Dominion Voting Systems. In particular, they claimed that ballots were being altered in a process known as "adjudication", intended to resolve minor errors. Trump asserted that human operators could switch Trump-intended votes to Biden votes.

On January 7, someone who had posed as a fake elector, and who had communicated with the Coffee County elections supervisor about election office access, escorted two Trump operatives into the office, which was captured on surveillance video. Allegedly assisted by employees of the data forensics firm SullivanStrickler, they copied data from voting equipment. In a recorded phone conversation, Atlanta Trump supporter Scott Hall recalled that the team "scanned every freaking ballot", including equipment and that they had "imaged all the hard drives" used on Election Day. The Washington Post reported in September 2023 that during the weeks following the 2020 election Hall had conversations with leaders of the Georgia Bureau of Investigation and the U.S. attorney for the Southern District of Georgia. Georgia prosecutors said Hall had a 63-minute phone conversation with Jeffrey Clark on January 2, 2021.

January 19 text messages between two men hired by the Trump legal team show intent to use the data to decertify the Georgia presidential results as well as the 2021 Georgia runoff election. The texts were between Sidney Powell associate Jim Penrose, a former National Security Agency official, and Doug Logan, whose firm Cyber Ninjas later ran the 2021 Maricopa County presidential ballot audit. (Note: Penrose and Logan were investigated but not indicted by special prosecutor D. J. Hilson in Michigan.)

The firm SullivanStrickler was subpoenaed by the special grand jury convened in this case in 2022. The company has insisted it is "politically agnostic" and had simply accepted paid work as a third-party contractor for the Trump campaign. During the investigation, the two Trump operatives admitted that Sidney Powell had sent them and that they had accessed a voting machine inside the building. Cathy Latham, one of the fake electors who had escorted them into the building, invoked the Fifth Amendment.

Of the 18 co-defendants indicted on August 14, 2023, four—Powell, Hampton, Latham, and Hall—are charged in the Coffee County breach.

=== Harassment of Fulton County election workers ===
After the election, Trump and Giuliani amplified a video that was taken out of context, and used the footage to make baseless claims that Ruby Freeman and her daughter Wandrea' ArShaye Moss had committed election fraud. Giuliani accused them of "passing around USB ports as if they were vials of heroin or cocaine" and engaging in "surreptitious illegal activity", citing video footage that, according to Moss, actually showed the women with "a ginger mint". The women and their family members were subjected to anti-Black racist smears and death threats and were warned by the Federal Bureau of Investigation (FBI) that they would not be safe in their home.

Freeman and Moss sued Giuliani for defamation in the U.S. District Court for the District of Columbia in December 2021.

While the lawsuit was ongoing, Moss testified in a June 2022 public hearing before the U.S. House Select Committee on the January 6 Attack. She said that, after Giuliani's remarks, she and her family were subjected to a barrage of racist threats, including "Be glad it's 2020 and not 1920", in reference to lynching in the United States. Freeman also testified: "There is nowhere I feel safe. Nowhere. Do you know how it feels to have the president of the United States target you?" Moss said that the false accusations against her had impacted her well-being "in a major way—in every way—all because of lies".

Giuliani admitted to the court that his statements about Freeman and Moss had been "defamatory per se" yet denied causing them "any damages". For failing to turn over subpoenaed evidence in the case, the judge sanctioned him, ordered him to pay over $230,000 of Freeman and Moss's attorney's fees, and entered a default judgment against him. Following a trial on December 11–15, 2023, the federal jury ordered Giuliani to pay $148 million to Freeman and Moss, including $75 million in punitive damages. Several months later, he lost his bid to dismiss the judgment. Although he filed for bankruptcy, a bankruptcy court judge said in July 2024 that he was no longer entitled to bankruptcy protection given his lack of transparency with the court. Giuliani and his creditors revised their agreement.

== Indictment ==
An Euler diagram of categories of charges faced by each defendant

The indictment document

A grand jury indicted Trump and 18 other defendants on August 14, 2023. The indictment mentions 30 unindicted co-conspirators. (Note: Unnamed, though some are identifiable.)

On November 9, 2025, DOJ Pardon Attorney Ed Martin announced that Trump had pardoned 77 people associated with the fake electors scheme, including his 18 co-defendants in the Georgia case (but not himself). Regardless, Trump does not have the authority to pardon people of charges in Georgia or any other state; as no one on the list was facing federal charges, his pardon was symbolic.

=== Charges ===
The original criminal charges fell into several clusters:

- Violation of the Georgia RICO (Racketeer Influenced and Corrupt Organizations) Act. This is a single blanket charge accusing all 19 defendants of engaging in a criminal enterprise to overturn the 2020 U.S. presidential election through obstructing the casting and counting of Georgia's electoral votes. 161 individual acts are listed in support of the criminal enterprise. RICO charges allow the court to consider evidence of alleged acts in other states.
- Solicitation of violation of oath by public officer and false statements and writings to public officials. These charges relate to false assertions about purported election fraud. Most of these charges allege acts targeted at members of the Georgia General Assembly: seven at a Senate Judiciary Committee meeting, two at a House Governmental Affairs Committee meeting, one to the Speaker of the House, and one for the attempt to have the Jeffrey Clark letter approved by U.S. Department of Justice officials. Four were targeted at Georgia Secretary of State Brad Raffensperger and his staff, covering the Trump–Raffensperger phone call and another communication in September 2021. The solicitation charges were dismissed by the judge in March 2024. In January 2025, the Georgia Court of Appeals affirmed the dismissal.
- Impersonating a public officer, forgery in the first degree, filing false documents and attempt to commit this, and false statements and writings in documents. These charges relate to fake electors purporting to be true electors and creating and distributing two false documents: the certificate of ascertainment and its cover letter. There is also one charge for a filing in the federal case Trump v. Kemp. Fake electors and the federal case filers were charged with the underlying crimes, while others were charged with conspiracy to commit them. (The filing false documents charges were dismissed by the judge in September 2024.)
- Perjury and false statements and writings to investigators. One charge for lying under oath to the Fulton County special-purpose grand jury, and one for lying to investigators with the Fulton County District Attorney's Office.
- Conspiracy to commit each of election fraud, computer theft, computer trespass, computer invasion of privacy, and to defraud the state. These charges relate to a breach of voting equipment in Coffee County, Georgia.
- Influencing witnesses and attempts to commit this, and conspiracy to commit solicitation of false statements and writings. These charges relate to an attempt to harass and influence Fulton County election worker Ruby Freeman.

=== Defendants ===
The 19 defendants named in the indictment are listed in the following tables. Conspiracy charge counts are in italics. Attempt charge counts are underlined. Charges dismissed before trial are ~~stricken through~~. Latham is listed separately in two of the tables, but her total includes charges from both tables together.

Of these defendants, Hall, Powell, Chesebro, and Ellis have pleaded guilty in return for some charges being dropped.

Electoral vote obstruction charges
Name	Function	RICO (1)	~~Solicitation of public officer (6)~~		False statements (14)				Impersonating a public officer (2)	Forgery (4)	~~Filing false~~ ~~documents (3)~~	Perjury (1)	Total
Name	Function	RICO (1)	~~GA~~	~~SoS~~	GA	SoS	DA	docs	Impersonating a public officer (2)	Forgery (4)	~~Filing false~~ ~~documents (3)~~	Perjury (1)	Total
Donald Trump	President of the United States	1	~~1~~	~~2~~		2		2	1	2	~~1+1~~		13
Rudy Giuliani	lawyer	1	~~3~~		3			2	1	2	~~1~~		13
Ray Smith III	lawyer	1	~~3~~		2			2	1	2	~~1~~		12
Cathy Latham*	fake elector, Coffee County GOP leader	1*						1	1	1	~~1~~		11*
Robert Cheeley	lawyer	1	~~1~~		1			2	1	2	~~1~~	1	10
John Eastman	lawyer	1	~~1~~					2	1	2	~~1+1~~		9
David Shafer	fake elector, state GOP chair	1					1	2	1	2	~~1~~		8
Kenneth Chesebro	lawyer	1						2	1	2	~~1~~		7
Mike Roman	campaign staff	1						2	1	2	~~1~~		7
Shawn Still	fake elector, state senator	1						2	1	2	~~1~~		7
Jenna Ellis	lawyer	1	~~1~~										2
Mark Meadows	White House chief of staff	1		~~1~~									2
Jeffrey Clark	U.S. DOJ official	1			1								2
# of people charged		13	~~6~~	~~2~~	4	1	1	10	10	10	~~10~~	1	

Coffee County election equipment breach charges
Name	Function	RICO (1)	Election fraud (2)	Computer crimes (3)	Defrauding the state (1)	Total
Cathy Latham*	Coffee County GOP leader, fake elector	1*	2	3	1	11*
Scott Hall	bail bondsman	1	2	3	1	7
Misty Hampton	Coffee County elections supervisor	1	2	3	1	7
Sidney Powell	campaign lawyer	1	2	3	1	7
# of people charged		3	4	4	4	

Fulton County election worker harassment charges
Name	Function	RICO (1)	Solicitation of false statements (1)	Influencing witnesses (3)	Total
Steve Lee	pastor from Illinois	1	1	1+2	5
Harrison Floyd	Black Voices for Trump leader	1	1	1	3
Trevian Kutti	publicist from Chicago	1	1	1	3
# of people charged		3	3	3	

There is overlap with the co-conspirators mentioned in the federal indictment of Trump issued two weeks earlier. In the federal indictment, Giuliani was listed as co-conspirator No. #1, Eastman was #2, Powell was #3, Clark was #4, and Chesebro was #5. All five of these people, though not charged in the federal prosecution, are charged as co-defendants in the Georgia prosecution. (Note: Co-conspirator #6 in the federal indictment has not yet been conclusively identified.)

The indictment references 30 "unindicted co-conspirators" who allegedly participated in some of the same criminal activities with the 19 defendants. These 30 people are not named in the indictment, but referred to by number. CNN, Just Security, The Washington Post and The Atlanta Journal-Constitution independently cross-referenced details in the indictment with already public information which does name the involved individuals, allowing many of them to be identified. Notable unindicted co-conspirators include Tom Fitton of Judicial Watch, Trump and Giuliani associate Boris Epshteyn, former New York City Police Commissioner Bernard Kerik, GOP political operative Phil Waldron, and current Lt. Governor of Georgia Burt Jones.

Of the 16 fake Georgia electors, three fake electors are named as defendants in the present indictment, four have been identified with a specific unindicted co-conspirator description, and nine are not conclusively tied to a specific unindicted co-conspirator description.

== Initial proceedings ==
=== Surrender and booking ===
After the grand jury issued arrest warrants for all 19 defendants per normal procedure, Willis provided the co-defendants an opportunity to voluntarily surrender by noon on August 25. All did so, and all but Floyd were immediately released on bond. The defendants surrendered to Fulton County Jail on these dates:

- August 22: Eastman and Hall
- August 23: Shafer, Latham, Smith, Chesebro, Giuliani, Powell, and Ellis
- August 24: Trump, Meadows, and Floyd
- August 25: Roman, Clark, Still, Hampton, Cheeley, Kutti, and Lee

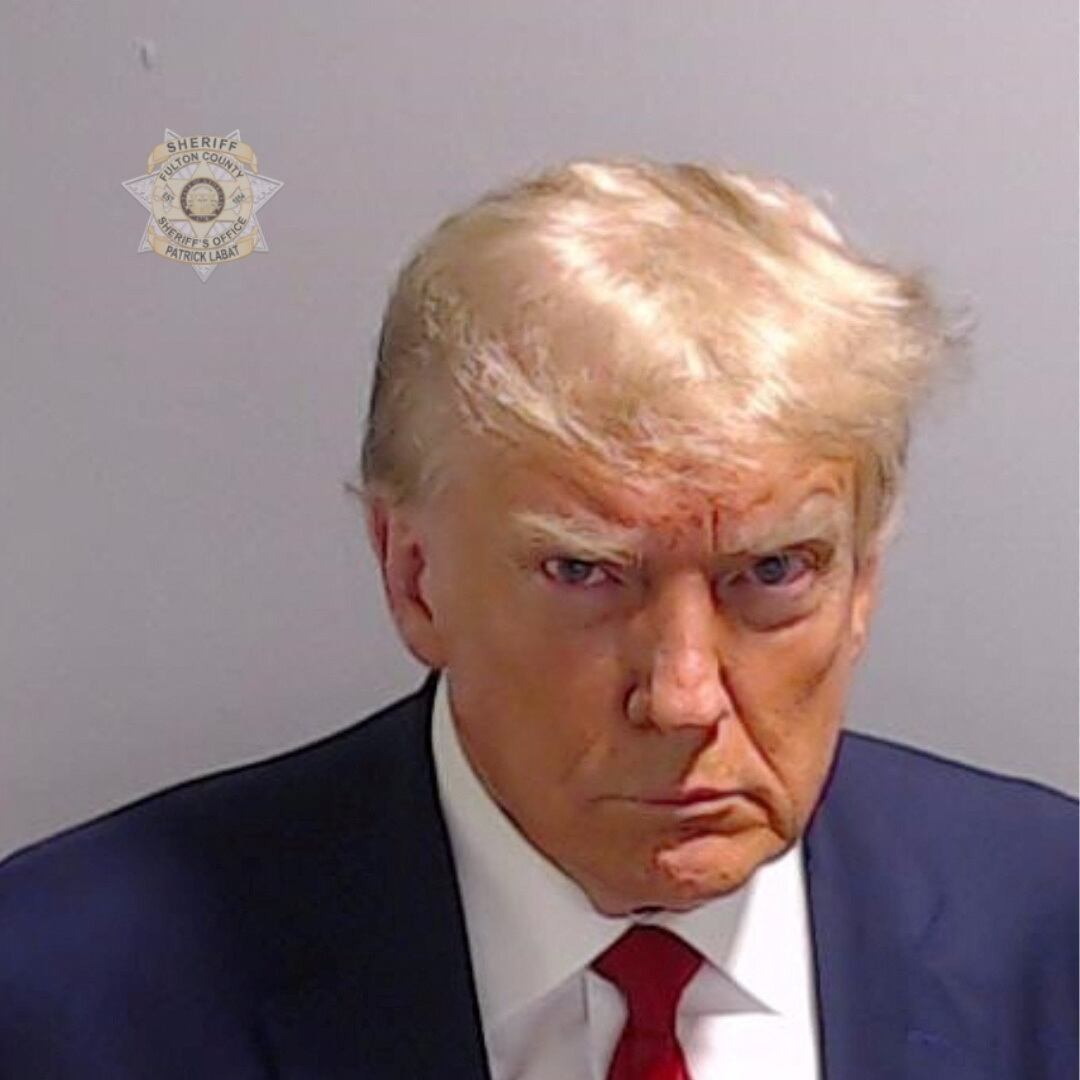
Trump's mug shot

Trump agreed to a $200,000 bond on August 21. His pre-negotiated release conditions include only using attorneys to discuss the case with co-defendants or witnesses and not intimidating co-defendants, unindicted co-conspirators, or witnesses on social media. When he surrendered, he used a bail bondsman to post his bail. Trump's mug shot was taken, a procedure not required in his previous indictments. Trump self-reported to authorities a height of 6 ft 3 in (191 cm) and a weight of 215 pounds (98 kg); four months earlier, he told New York authorities he was 6 ft 2 in (188 cm) and 240 pounds (110 kg).

Floyd surrendered and was briefly jailed, not having negotiated a bond agreement; while in jail, he refused a consent bond from Willis's office. In a court hearing on August 25, he was denied bond, being deemed a flight risk due to a pending case against him in Maryland for misdemeanor assault on an FBI agent. He told the court that he was unable to afford a lawyer and ineligible for a court-appointed one. His bond was set at $100,000 on August 29, and he was released the next day.

Giuliani had his bond set at $150,000; Chesebro, Clark, Eastman, Ellis, Floyd, Meadows, and Powell at $100,000; Kutti, Latham, Lee, and Shafer at $75,000; Cheeley, Roman, and Smith at $50,000; and Hall, Hampton, and Still at $10,000. (Note: Hampton's and Still's bonds are signature bonds.)

=== Arraignments ===
All 19 defendants waived their right to appear for their September 6 arraignment and pleaded not guilty on the following dates:

- August 28: Smith
- August 29: Powell and Kutti
- August 31: Trump and Ellis
- September 1: Giuliani, Chesebro, Cheeley, Lee, Roman, Floyd, and Hall
- September 5: Meadows, Eastman, Clark, Latham, Still, Shafer, and Hampton

Chesebro, Ellis, Hall, and Powell each later pleaded guilty.

== Guilty pleas ==
Name	Date	Pleaded guilty to	Sentence
Scott Hall	September 29, 2023	Conspiracy to commit intentional interference with the performance of election duties (5 misdemeanor counts)	Five years of probation, $5,000 fine, 200 hours of community service, a public apology to the state of Georgia, and to testify truthfully in future trials.
Sidney Powell	October 19, 2023	Conspiracy to commit intentional interference with the performance of election duties (6 misdemeanor counts)	Six years of probation, $6,000 fine, $2,700 restitution, a public apology to the state of Georgia, and to testify truthfully in future trials.
Kenneth Chesebro	October 20, 2023	Conspiracy to commit filing false documents (1 felony count)	Five years of probation, $5,000 restitution, 100 hours of community service, a public apology to the state of Georgia, and to testify truthfully in future trials.
Jenna Ellis	October 24, 2023	Aiding and abetting false statements and writings (1 felony count)	Five years of probation, $5,000 restitution, 100 hours of community service, a public apology to the state of Georgia, and to testify truthfully in future trials.

Hall and Powell had each originally been charged with seven felonies related to the Coffee County election equipment breach. These felony charges were dropped when they instead pleaded guilty to misdemeanors: Hall to five counts of conspiracy to commit intentional interference with the performance of election duties and Powell to six counts of intentionally interfering with the performance of election duties.

Chesebro had originally been charged with seven felonies related to electoral vote obstruction. He pleaded guilty to only one of these felonies: conspiracy to commit filing false documents. At the hearing where he pleaded guilty, he admitted to conspiring with Trump and Giuliani. He must turn over all evidence in his possession.

All four agreed to testify truthfully regarding defendants; not speak to witnesses, defendants, or media; and submit to the court a letter apologizing to the state and people of Georgia. Hall wrote a few paragraphs, but Powell and Chesebro each wrote only one sentence. Ellis read her apology aloud to the judge.

Powell worked closely with the Trump campaign's legal team during the post-election period, and thus many people anticipate that she has significant information about Trump and Giuliani. She is required to testify about the defendants, yet she may be able to plead the Fifth in response to some questions to avoid self-incrimination. (Although she no longer faces charges in Georgia, she may eventually face federal charges; the federal indictment for election obstruction describes her as Co-conspirator No. 3.) Powell later promoted claims that Willis had "extorted" her into pleading guilty, despite having stated in a court filing that her plea had been made voluntarily, and continued to allege that the election was rigged.

Roman, Cheeley, Hampton, and at least three other defendants rejected similar plea deals. As of October 25, 2023, Eastman had not been offered a deal; on November 27, he asked for an extension on the deadline for deals. The Guardian reported that prosecutors did not intend to offer a deal to Trump, Giuliani, or Meadows.

=== Proffer video leak ===
The four who pleaded guilty gave recorded interviews. Hampton's attorney, Jonathan Miller III, leaked these proffer videos to the media, and parts of them were published on November 13, 2023:

- On September 29, Scott Hall complained he was never reimbursed for his charter flight to Coffee County on January 7, 2021, which he said he did "for shits and giggles" as a "political tourist" and a "water boy". He said the "brain trust" in the Coffee County breach included co-defendant Robert Cheeley, who had asked Hall (a bail bondsman) to help him locate Ruby Freeman.
- On October 18, Sidney Powell told investigators that Giuliani, at a December 18, 2020, meeting in the Oval Office including Trump, had discussed accessing voting equipment. She said she still believed there was "machine fraud", though she also admitted she didn't know how the voting machines work, and that she personally would have considered using the military to seize voting machines if Trump had empowered her to do so by appointing her special counsel. She said Meadows told her the next morning: "You know, it's not going to happen." She said she called Trump for six minutes on December 24 "[p]robably to see how he was doing and to say I'm sorry" for losing the legal challenges. She maintained that she had nothing to do with the Coffee County breach.
- On October 20, Kenneth Chesebro said he attended an Oval Office meeting on December 16, 2020, regarding Wisconsin, after which he briefed Trump on Arizona and told him the strategy he'd laid out in his November 18 memo. He said he played a role in sending the certificates for the Wisconsin slate of fake electors to Congress. He said he began communicating directly with John Eastman in late December and helped edit Eastman's December 23 memo. He said he flew to Capitol Hill on January 2, 2021, in case the Trump campaign invited him to participate in strategy meetings, which it did not.
- On October 23, Jenna Ellis told investigators that Trump's deputy chief of staff, Dan Scavino, had told her in December 2020 that Trump would refuse to leave office. Ellis said: "And he said to me, you know, in a kind of excited tone, 'Well, we don't care, and we're not going to leave.'" She said that co-defendant Ray Smith had asked Preston Haliburton, a lawyer involved in Trump's election challenges in Georgia, to get security footage from an Atlanta center where ballots were counted; this footage contained the footage of Moss and Freeman.

The day after the videos were published, Willis renewed her request for a protective order over discovery materials, this time on an emergency basis. Her court filing alleged that the leak was "clearly intended to intimidate witnesses in this case". Most defense attorneys agreed to allow some material to be marked "sensitive". Though Miller had argued that "the public needs to know" about the testimony (he said it helped his client's case), McAfee disagreed that it was appropriate "to start litigating the case before we actually get inside of a courtroom". On November 16, 2023, McAfee issued the protective order.

== Pretrial proceedings ==
On the morning of August 24, 2023, before Trump's planned surrender, paperwork was filed to have Steven Sadow take over from Drew Findling as Trump's lead counsel.

On October 10, Willis argued that Chesebro's five memos should not be protected by attorney-client privilege (as his attorneys had requested) since they did not contain advice about litigation but rather a political strategy for interrupting the transfer of power to Biden.

Floyd tagged Secretary of State Brad Raffensperger and former Fulton County poll worker Ruby Freeman on social media and spoke on podcasts, apparently violating his bond agreement. On November 15, Willis asked Judge McAfee to revoke Floyd's bond and send him back to jail. A week later, McAfee decided not to revoke the bond, although he agreed that Floyd had violated it. Instead, he asked the prosecution and defense to agree on how to revise the bond terms to more clearly address how to protect public safety.

A pretrial hearing was held on December 1. Judge McAfee had previously set this as the deadline for any pre-trial motions by the co-defendants (Chesebro and Powell excluded).

=== Attempts to dismiss charges ===
In an August 19, 2023 motion, Meadows asked for the case to be dismissed entirely, arguing that "[t]he State's prosecution of Mr. Meadows threatens the important federal interest in providing the President of the United States with close, confidential advice and assistance, firmly entranced [sic] in federal law for nearly 100 years." The motion also argues that Meadows is immune under the First Amendment, protecting political speech, and the Fourteenth Amendment, prohibiting charges arising from statutes that are "unconstitutionally vague". In addition, since the Georgia indictment charges Meadows for his actions in other states, the motion raises the possibility that any state could therefore prosecute him for his activities in Georgia, the implications of which "are staggering".

In a filing dated September 11, 2023, Trump asked for several charges to be dismissed.

Powell said the review of the voting system had been legal because Coffee County authorized it. On October 5, 2023, McAfee denied Powell's motion to dismiss the charges; he said he had no authority to do that so close to her trial.

On October 11, 2023, Chesebro and Powell's lawyers argued that their clients should not face the RICO charge. Chesebro argued that the pro-Trump electors were indeed public officers under federal law, not merely impersonating public officers, and that he therefore could not have conspired in their impersonation. On October 17, Judge McAfee said he would not dismiss the charges. He said that, although Chesebro may disagree with "the state's legal interpretation", the charges were not "defective".

On January 8, 2024, Trump asked for the criminal charges against him to be dismissed on the basis of "presidential immunity". The acts described in the indictment are "at the heart of his official responsibilities as President", his team said in the filing.

On January 19, 2024, Floyd appeared for a hearing on his motions to dismiss charges. On May 28, McAfee said that Floyd could continue his efforts to access over 500,000 ballots from Fulton County, which Floyd says he expects will provide evidence of voter fraud. Floyd is claiming that he was genuinely concerned about fraud and thus that the charges against him are invalid.

On March 28, 2024, McAfee was scheduled to hear arguments from Trump's lawyers based on the First Amendment and from Shafer's lawyers based on their assertion that Shafer's conduct was legal. On April 4, McAfee rejected Trump's claim that his statements are protected political speech.

=== Attempts to remove to federal court ===
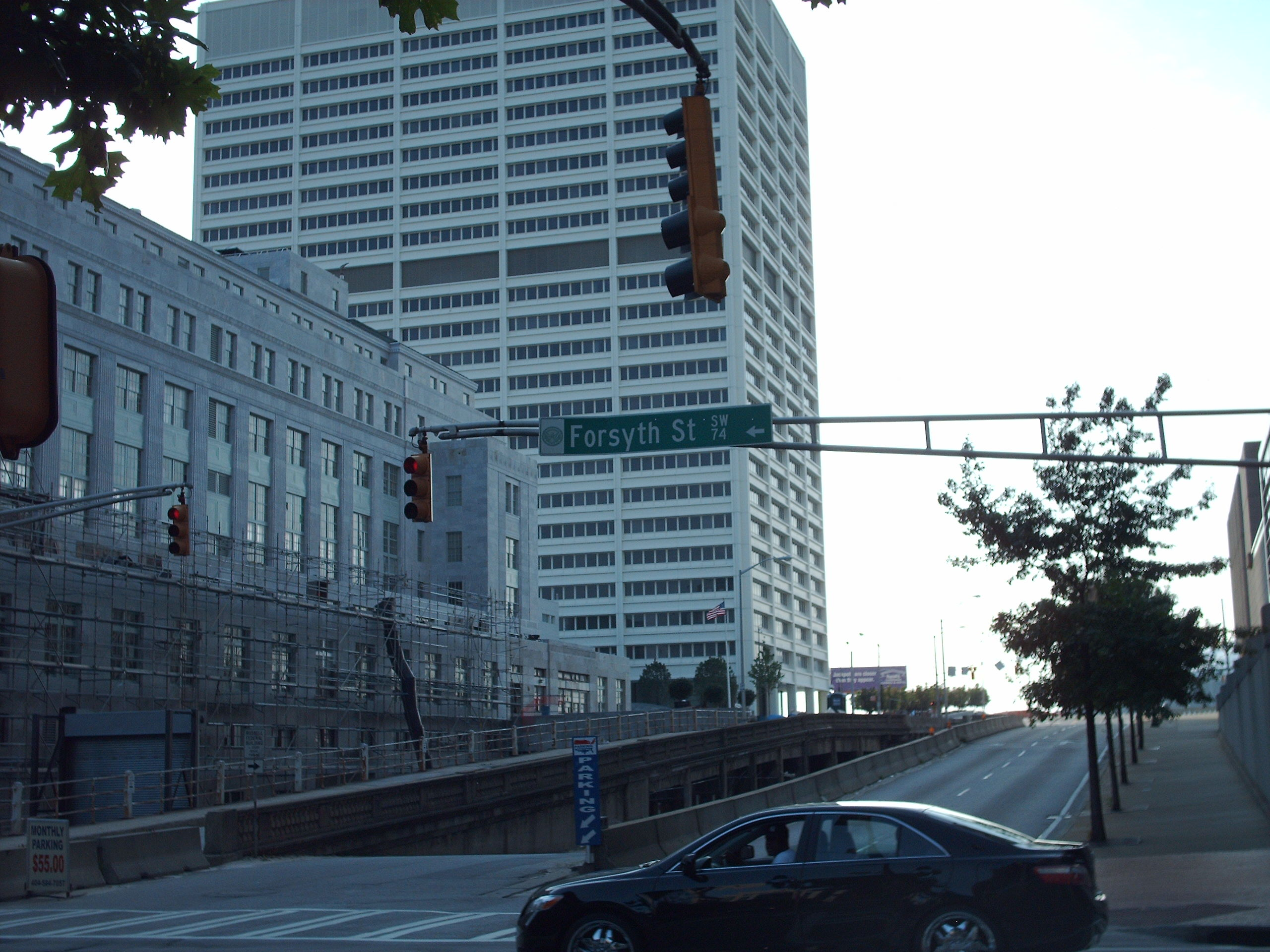
Federal removal proceedings were heard by the U.S. District Court for the Northern District of Georgia (headquarters pictured).

Five defendants asked the federal U.S. District Court for the Northern District of Georgia to move their cases to federal court, called "removal". Though all charges would remain under Georgia state law, the consequences of removal would include widening the geographic range of the jury pool and prohibiting cameras in the courtroom. District Court Judge Steve C. Jones presided over their hearings. Jones denied requests from Meadows and Clark to delay their arrests, so they surrendered to the Georgia court in August 2023 before their removal requests were heard. All five defendants' motions to remove were denied in September 2023.

On August 15, 2023, the day after the indictment, Meadows filed a motion to have his case removed to federal court. He argued that, under the Supremacy Clause of the Constitution, he is immune from state prosecution for anything he did while he served as White House Chief of Staff. (Note: State v. Meadows, 1:23-cv-03621 (N.D. Ga.)) Meadows' removal hearing was on August 28. On September 8, Judge Jones rejected Meadows's request, finding he had not met even the "quite low" threshold for removal. Meadows immediately appealed the ruling to the 11th Circuit Court of Appeals and asked Jones for an emergency stay of his Georgia case while his appeal was pending. On September 12, Jones rejected Meadows's request to pause his case. On December 15, Meadows had a removal hearing in the appeals court, which on December 18 rejected Meadows' motion. On January 2, 2024, Meadows asked for his removal request to be heard by all 12 judges on the 11th U.S. Circuit Court of Appeals, but on February 28, his request for a hearing was denied. On July 26, his attorneys asked the U.S. Supreme Court to hear his removal request. They cited the Supreme Court's decision earlier that month in Trump v. United States which ruled that former presidents have some immunity. On November 12, the Supreme Court refused to move the case.

On August 21, 2023, Clark also filed a motion to remove his case to federal court. (Note: State v. Clark, 1:23-cv-03721 (N.D. Ga.)) Clark claimed the same protections from state prosecution as Meadows, as Clark was a Justice Department official at the time. His filing additionally argued that the entire case should be removed to federal court for all defendants. Clark's removal hearing was on September 18. On September 29, Jones rejected the motion. On October 9, Clark appealed.

Defendants Shafer, (Note: State v. Shafer, 1:23-cv-03720 (N.D. Ga.)) Latham, (Note: State v. Latham, 1:23-cv-03803 (N.D. Ga.)) and Still (Note: State v. Still, 1:23-cv-03792 (N.D. Ga.)) filed motions in August 2023 to remove the case to federal court. They asserted in these filings that they had convened as alternate electors "at the direction of" Trump via his attorneys, making them federal officials. At a hearing on September 20, their lawyers argued that the Electoral Count Act of 1887 legally allowed the casting of contingent electoral ballots because a Georgia state court case was still pending past the specified safe harbor date, six days before the electoral vote date. On September 29, Jones rejected the motion, noting that federal law does not in fact explicitly create the position of contingent elector. On October 6, Shafer, Latham, and Still appealed.

Though Trump had formally indicated he might seek removal to federal court, he told the court on September 28, 2023, the day before his deadline to seek removal, that he would not do so.

=== Trial scheduling ===
On August 16, 2023, Willis motioned for all defendants to be tried together beginning March 4, 2024. The filing said that the schedule had been chosen so as not to conflict with Trump's already-scheduled court dates in other matters, "but also to protect the State of Georgia's and the public's interest in a prompt resolution of the charges". The requested trial date was nearly two months into the 2024 Republican Party presidential primary season, and one day before Super Tuesday. Former U.S. Attorney for Georgia Michael J. Moore expressed doubt that the motions and discovery process would be completed so quickly, and that Willis actually believed the case would be ready by March. "I think it's just a PR move", he said.

Trump advised the court on August 24 that he opposed a speedy trial, and filed a motion to sever on August 31. On November 27, Eastman asked to be tried before Trump. Meadows said he wanted to be tried alone.

In November 2023, Willis proposed starting the trial on August 5, 2024, expecting that it might continue into early 2025. Referencing the defendants' right to a speedy trial, she expressed concerns about cascading delays due to "defendant Trump's other criminal trials". As expected, Trump did appeal his federal election-obstruction trial, which at the time was scheduled for March 2024 and was never held, the case being dismissed. His trials in New York and Florida, set for March and May respectively, were delayed for other reasons. The New York trial was only briefly delayed and concluded on May 30. The case in Florida never went to trial and was dismissed.

In January 2024, because Shawn Still was serving in the Georgia General Assembly, he was given extra time for pretrial filings. He filed six motions and had a hearing in May.

==== Chesebro and Powell speedy trial motions ====
In late August, Chesebro and Powell requested speedy trials under Georgia's Speedy Trial Act. They wished to be tried individually, not alongside any other defendant; however, at a September 6 hearing (the first televised one in the case), Judge McAfee denied their motions to sever their cases from each other. As Chesebro had already been scheduled for trial on October 23, this became Powell's scheduled trial date too.

In early September, discussing whether all 19 defendants could be tried together on October 23 (per Willis's request), Judge McAfee acknowledged that such a complex trial would take months and decided that only Chesebro and Powell would be tried on October 23.

On September 29, special prosecutor Nathan Wade told McAfee that the DA's office would extend plea deals to Chesebro and Powell, and both defendants pleaded guilty shortly before juror selection began: Powell accepted a deal on October 19, and Chesebro on October 20, the day that hundreds of potential jurors had been ordered to appear.

=== Trial preparations ===
Unlike the proceedings in Trump's other three indictments where photography was not permitted, the Georgia proceedings would have been livestreamed on YouTube and journalists would have been allowed to use their phones in the courtroom. However, the juries were to remain anonymous at least until the end of trial and have security. Although there is no rule against bringing a sitting president to trial, the prosecution of Trump as a sitting president may have been complex.

Hall, Powell, Chesebro, and Ellis, after having pleaded guilty, would not have been tried. The trial for the 15 remaining defendants was never scheduled; Willis was removed as prosecutor, and the case was dismissed.

==== Evidence and witnesses ====
During Chesebro and Powell's trial preparation in 2023, prosecutors had filed to seek testimony from Boris Epshteyn, Lin Wood, several GOP officials in other states, conspiracy theorist Alex Jones (whose attorney said he would plead the Fifth), and former RNC Chairwoman Ronna McDaniel. The Atlanta Journal-Constitution reported in December 2023 that the prosecution's nearly 200-person witness list included former vice president Mike Pence, former attorney general Bill Barr, former acting attorney general Jeffrey Rosen and his deputy Richard Donoghue, congressman Scott Perry and former Trump advisor Steve Bannon.

On July 1, 2024, the U.S. Supreme Court ruled in a separate case that, for acts considered "official", former presidents are immune from criminal prosecution. Further, evidence of these official acts cannot be used to prosecute them for other acts. This will affect the Georgia prosecution in various ways. For example, Trump's interviews with Justice Department attorneys (including co-defendant Jeffrey Clark) can no longer be introduced as evidence in the Georgia trial, complicating the prosecution's case against both Trump and Clark.

=== Dismissal of solicitation and false documents charges ===
On March 13, 2024, Judge McAfee dismissed six charges including three against Trump. The dismissed charges dealt with soliciting public officers, including Georgia Secretary of State Brad Raffensperger and then-Georgia House Speaker David Ralson, to violate their oaths. The judge said the prosecution did not allege sufficient detail to "give the Defendants enough information to prepare their defenses intelligently". The judge noted that the deficiency was "easily remedied", but since Georgia standards for indictments are stricter than federal standards, the charges could not be clarified during a court proceeding, but would need a new grand jury indictment. The order leaves intact other charges. The Georgia Court of Appeals upheld these dismissals on January 17, 2025.

On September 12, 2024, McAfee dismissed a further three charges regarding filing false documents. Two of the charges were for filing the false electoral documents with the federal U.S. District Court for the Northern District of Georgia, and the other was for a filing in the case Trump v. Kemp in the same court. McAfee ruled that because the documents were filed in a federal court, they could not be prosecuted under state laws.

== Proceedings on prosecutorial impropriety ==
After one of the co-defendants surfaced information about a romantic relationship between district attorney Fani Willis and special prosecutor Nathan Wade, Judge McAfee ruled that one of them must leave the case, so Wade left. The Georgia Court of Appeals later ruled that Willis also must be removed. This issue delayed the case throughout 2024 and into late 2025.

=== Background ===
On January 8, 2024, Mike Roman's attorney filed with the court alleging that Fani Willis and Nathan Wade had a romantic relationship. Willis had hired Wade as special prosecutor in the Trump case in November 2021. The filing asserted that Willis went on vacations with Wade and so Willis profited from hiring him, which would be a conflict of interest. The filing requested that the charges against Roman be dropped. It also requested that Willis be disqualified from the case; Willis's office said it would motion to have this request dismissed. On January 25, Trump joined Roman's effort by filing a similar complaint.

Wade was concurrently involved with divorce proceedings from his wife, Joycelyn, which had also begun in November 2021. On January 8, 2024, Joycelyn's attorneys subpoenaed Willis to testify in the divorce case. On January 19, Joycelyn filed in her divorce case that Nathan had purchased a 2022 trip for himself and Willis to Miami with a Royal Caribbean cruise and a 2023 trip to San Francisco and a Napa Valley hotel. Clara Bowman (reportedly Nathan's mother) came too. On January 22, a judge in Cobb County Superior Court unsealed the records of the Wades' ongoing divorce. The unsealed records had no reference to an alleged affair between Nathan and Willis. On January 30, Nathan and Joycelyn Wade reached a temporary agreement on some of their issues. Willis and Nathan had been scheduled to testify in the Wades' divorce, but their depositions were no longer needed.

On January 14, Willis made her first public comments about the allegation, saying Wade is qualified for his role and is paid the same rate as the other two special prosecutors on the case. According to The New York Times, Wade had little prior prosecutorial experience beyond being employed for about a year in the late 1990s by the Cobb County Solicitor's Office, which prosecutes misdemeanors and traffic citations.

=== Judicial hearing and rulings ===
On January 18, with Willis unwilling to recuse herself, Judge McAfee scheduled a hearing on Roman's request to dismiss her from the case. On February 2, the court deadline for Willis to respond to the allegation, she acknowledged she had been in a personal relationship with Wade since 2022 but said she had no financial or personal conflict of interest and that there were no grounds for her dismissal. Willis and Wade were subpoenaed to testify at the February 15 hearing.

Seventeen ethics experts, former prosecutors and defense attorneys filed a "friend of the court" brief with Judge McAfee on February 5. They found that, even if all of Roman's allegations were true, they would "not even come close" to requiring Willis be removed from the case, or that the charges be dropped.

On February 12, McAfee said he would consider removing Willis from the case if he finds a financial conflict of interest. McAfee clarified that not all of Roman's complaints are relevant and that, at a February 15 hearing, he would consider details of the Willis–Wade relationship only in the context of whether the relationship led to financial benefit.

At the first day of the hearing, Roman's lawyers questioned whether prosecutors had lied in their affidavit about when they began their romantic relationship. On February 27, Wade's former law partner Terrence Bradley testified that he did not know when Wade and Willis's relationship began. Although Bradley had previously informed the defense team that the relationship began in "late 2019," he testified that "I speculated on some things." On March 4, Shafer's attorneys asked to subpoena Cindi Lee Yeager, a co-chief deputy district attorney for Cobb County, should McAfee reopen hearings.

On March 15, Judge Scott McAfee ruled that either Willis (along with her office) or Wade must leave the case, because their relationship brought about a "significant appearance of impropriety". Willis committed a "tremendous lapse in judgment" and her "testimony during the evidentiary hearing" was "unprofessional", but "simply making bad choices – even repeatedly" does not establish an actual conflict of interest under Georgia law, stated McAfee. As there was not enough evidence that Willis "acquired a personal stake in the prosecution, or that her financial arrangements had any impact on the case", an actual conflict of interest was not proven, ruled McAfee. Later that day, Wade resigned from the case.

On May 6, ABC's Good Morning America aired an interview with Wade regarding the matter.

A year later, on March 17, 2025, Fulton County Superior Court Judge Rachel Krause ruled that Willis’ office should have turned over documents that Roman's defense attorney Ashleigh Merchant had requested under Georgia’s Open Records Act. Krause said that Willis's refusals to do so "were intentional, not done in good faith, and were substantially groundless and vexatious", that her office must turn over any remaining documents within 30 days, and that she must pay Merchant's attorney fees of over $54,000.

==== Appeals ====
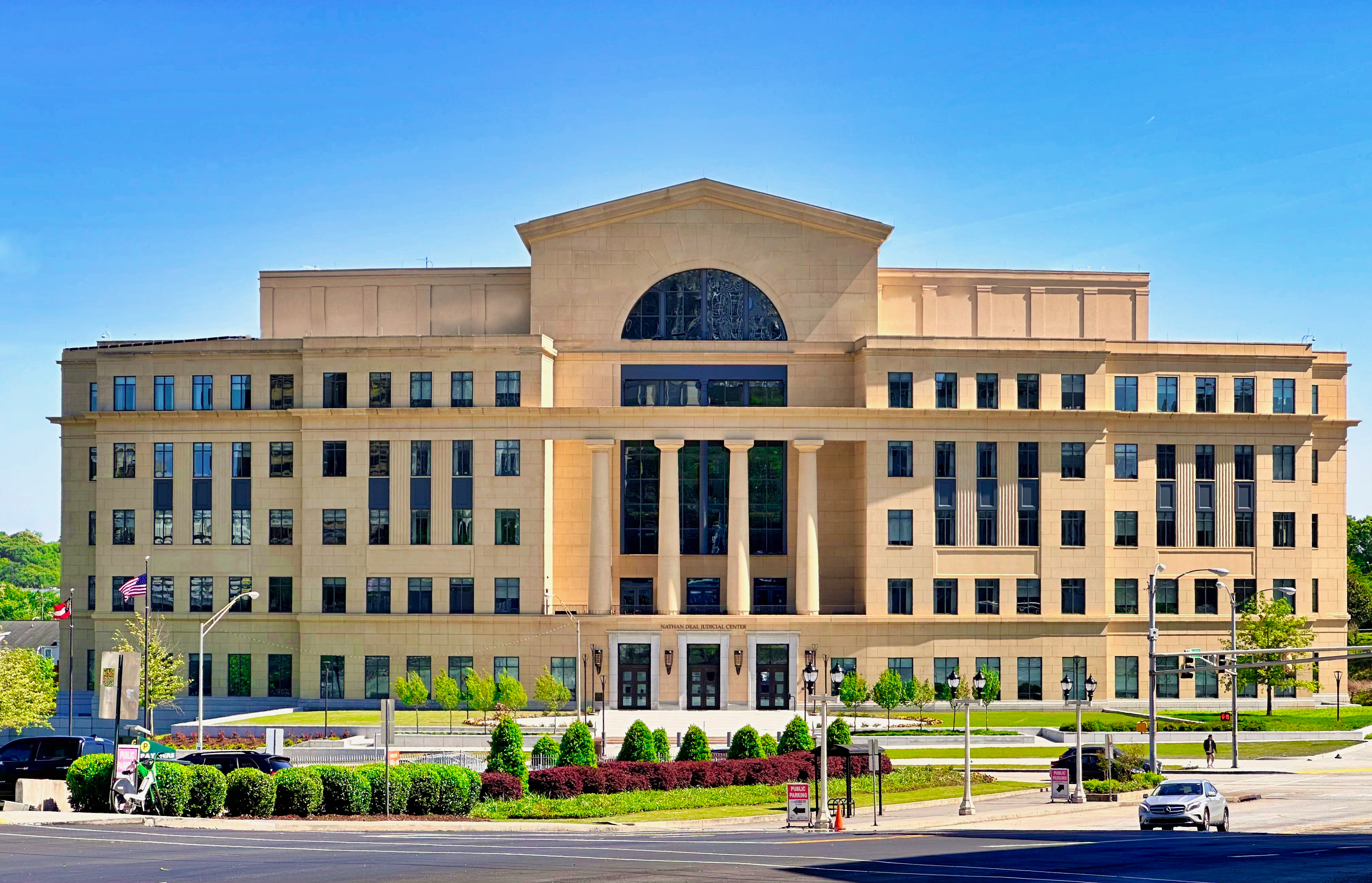
The appeal was decided by the Georgia Court of Appeals (headquarters pictured).

After Wade resigned, satisfying McAfee's March 15 ruling, Trump continued to seek Fani Willis's removal from the case as well. On March 20, McAfee allowed Trump to turn to the Georgia Court of Appeals, though McAfee clarified that Trump's appeal of this matter would not delay "the many other unrelated pending pretrial motions" that McAfee was addressing. On March 29, Trump submitted the appeal. On April 8, Willis asked the court to reject it.

On May 8, the Georgia Court of Appeals said it would hear the appeal to dismiss Willis, and on June 5, it paused the election racketeering case so it could first decide about Willis. While such cases usually rely on legal briefs, Trump's team asked the court to hear oral arguments. Oral arguments were tentatively set for October 4 before judges E. Trenton Brown III, Benjamin A. Land, and Todd Markle, then delayed to December 5, then canceled.

On December 19, the Georgia Court of Appeals disqualified Willis in a 2–1 decision. The decision noted that Willis was a public prosecutor with a special duty to make decisions in the public’s interest, unlike a private advocate, and held that "the remedy crafted by the trial court... did nothing to address the appearance of impropriety that existed at times when DA Willis was exercising her broad pretrial discretion about who to prosecute and what charges to bring." The dissenting judge wrote that this determination was properly under the discretion of the trial court and not the appeals court, and that the majority had ruled, "with the citation of no supporting authority and apparently for the first time in the history of our state, that the mere existence of an appearance of impropriety, in and of itself, is sufficient to reverse the trial court’s refusal to disqualify the district attorney and her entire office [emphasis in original]."

On January 9, 2025, Willis' office appealed to the Supreme Court of Georgia. On September 16, the court declined to hear the appeal by a 4–3 vote.

Due to a 2025 Georgia law, defendants in dismissed cases in which the prosecutor has been disqualified for misconduct may seek reimbursement of attorney fees, with county where the case was prosecuted paying them with taxpayer funds. After Willis failed to overturn her disqualification, this new law can be applied to Trump and his co-defendants. Trump had by early 2025 paid about $2.7 million to his lead attorneys in this case, and the Georgia Republican Party had paid about $2 million for other defendants, according to the Atlanta Journal-Constitution. As Senate Bill 244, the law had passed the Georgia Senate on March 6 and won final approval on April 4, and was signed by Georgia Governor Brian Kemp on May 14, 2025.

=== Georgia State Senate investigation ===
In August 2024, State Senator Bill Cowsert, a Republican who chaired the Georgia State Senate Special Committee on Investigations, subpoenaed Willis for testimony and documents. Willis challenged the validity of the subpoena. The Supreme Court of Georgia will hear the challenge in October 2025.

== Dismissal ==
For the case to continue, the Georgia Court of Appeals required that the executive director of the Prosecuting Attorneys' Council of Georgia select a substitute prosecutor. It could be someone publicly or privately employed, or it could be someone employed by the Prosecuting Attorneys' Council itself.

After the Supreme Court of Georgia declined in September 2025 to hear Willis's appeal, Judge McAfee said the council must choose a new prosecutor soon or he would dismiss the case. He extended the deadline to November 14 after Pete Skandalakis, the council's executive director, said he could not predict how long it might take. Meanwhile, Willis's office handed over to Skandalakis 101 boxes of documents and the entire case file on a hard drive. On the morning of the deadline, Skandalakis announced that, having been unable to find a willing prosecutor, he would take on the role himself.

On November 26, 2025, Skandalakis announced that all charges against Trump and the remaining defendants were being dropped.

His reasoning was as follows.

Shafer, Still, and Latham had no apparent "criminal intent". Skandalakis wrote:

Acting on the advice of an attorney they reasonably believed to be an expert in election law, Shafer, Still, and Latham understood themselves to be fulfilling a civic responsibility.They genuinely and sincerely believed that their actions were a lawful component of the election contest process. Thus, I find no criminal intent concerning the meeting of the Republican Electors and their plan to preserve an election challenge by casting their ballots for President Trump.

Although Giuliani, Smith, and Cheeley made "wrong and baseless" statements to Georgia General Assembly committees, "[t]hese statements were unsworn" and there is no precedent of alleging a crime involving unsworn statements to the General Assembly. Skandalakis wrote:

...witnesses on opposite sides of these issues could give statements that differ in important material facts... Criminalizing such unsworn testimony would have a chilling effect on witnesses appearing before the Legislature on important issues...

Regarding the Coffee County election equipment breach, Powell and Hall already pleaded guilty and "would likely serve as key witnesses at any future trial involving these events." However, "[t]heir pleas and proffers will present credibility concerns, particularly in Hall’s case."

The alleged two false statements by Shafer did not appear to be perjury.

Regarding the charge against Clark, a criminal attempt to commit false statements and writings, Skandalakis wrote:

It is difficult to see how a jury could find, beyond a reasonable doubt, that Clark committed a criminal attempt when he (1) labeled the document as a draft, (2) submitted it for supervisory approval, (3) accepted his superiors’ decision not to issue it, and (4) never delivered the letter to anyone in any state.

Prosecution of this count is further complicated by attorney-client and work-product privileges, which shield pre-decisional legal analysis and internal communications among DOJ attorneys.

- * *

Additional doctrines including Federal Supremacy, Federal and Qualified Immunity, and the Due Process requirement of fair notice present further formidable obstacles for these counts to go forward.

Meadows could have "believed it was his role" to do what he did: "The blurred lines between campaign duties and official duties do not provide an easy, obvious answer. His actions, both in Georgia and in other states, remain subject to interpretation." Meadows has a "diary and notes" in the National Archives that neither he nor his lawyers can access, and it would be hard to pursue a fair trial without that information.

The alleged crimes against Ruby Freeman are concerning, he said, but the three accused people should be prosecuted in Cobb County rather than in Fulton County.

"There is no realistic prospect", he wrote, "that a sitting President will be compelled to appear in Georgia to stand trial on the allegations in this indictment", and by the end of Trump's second presidency in January 2029, "eight years will have elapsed since the phone call at issue [with Raffensperger]." At that point, the state would have to litigate the immunity issues — and succeed — before beginning a jury trial. He concluded that "bringing this case before a jury in 2029, 2030, or even 2031 would be nothing short of a remarkable feat", as it is difficult "to move appellate issues through the courts with any degree of speed."

If there were indeed a conspiracy, then Trump, as "lead defendant in this case .... bears the responsibility" for it. While severing Trump from the co-defendants is technically an option, it would be "futile and unproductive" to prosecute Trump's co-defendants without him. Also, he said, the Prosecuting Attorneys' Council of Georgia lacks sufficient budget and resources to immediately pursue trials of Trump's co-defendants while planning a future case against Trump.

== Reactions ==
U.S. House Republicans opened an investigation into Willis hours before Trump surrendered for arrest. Congressman Jim Jordan wrote her asking if she had coordinated with the Smith special counsel investigation or used federal money in her investigation. Jordan demanded Willis provide documents and communications by September 7. Willis wrote to Jordan on September 7 that his letter contained "inaccurate information and misleading statements", alleging he was seeking to "obstruct a Georgia criminal proceeding and to advance outrageous misrepresentations" without constitutional authority, for his personal political gain.

Some Georgia Republican legislators, notably state senator Colton Moore, proposed convening a special legislative session to consider impeaching Willis. Such a move would require consent of Democrats, and Republican governor Brian Kemp said he opposed it to prevent "political theater that only inflames the emotions of the moment" and "some grifter scam" to raise campaign contributions for Moore.

In May 2023, Georgia Republicans enacted a law that created a commission empowered to discipline or remove state prosecutors who were alleged to have violated their duties. As he signed the bill creating the commission, Governor Kemp said it would curb "far-left prosecutors" who are "making our communities less safe". Days after the Willis indictments, state senator Chad Dixon announced he would file a complaint against Willis when the commission commenced in October, alleging she had weaponized the justice system against political opponents with an "unabashed goal to become some sort of leftist celebrity". Hours after the commission became effective on October 1, eight Republican Georgia senators filed a complaint seeking to have Willis sanctioned for her alleged "improperly cherry-picked cases to further her personal political agenda".

On September 14, 2023, one of the defendants, Jenna Ellis, said she would not support Trump for office again because he does not accept responsibility for his wrongdoings.

On September 15, 2023, a three-judge panel ruled that the charges against Shawn Still would not automatically deprive him of his state senate seat. He held his seat in the 2024 election.

On June 26, 2025, New York's appellate court ruled that Chesebro should be disbarred for attempting to overturn Trump's 2020 election loss in Georgia. "That basis alone" was sufficient to question his fitness to practice law, the court wrote.
