= Atlanta Public Schools cheating scandal =

2009 event

Several teachers and principals in the Atlanta Public Schools (APS) district cheated on state-administered standardized tests in 2009. The scandal was exposed and the subsequent trial in 2014–2015 saw national attention. It was one of the biggest cheating scandals in American history.

== Background ==
In 2009, The Atlanta Journal-Constitution published analyses of Criterion-Referenced Competency Tests (CRCT) results which showed statistically unlikely test scores, including extraordinary gains or losses in a single year. An investigation by the Georgia Bureau of Investigation (GBI) released in July 2011 indicated that 44 out of 56 schools cheated on the 2009 CRCT. The investigation implicated 178 educators in correcting answers entered by students. A 2011 Politifact analysis of the investigation into the scandal up to that point found 5-6% of teachers in the district were implicated, along with 54% of principals and that cheating occurred at 44 of 56 schools. Of these, 35 educators were indicted and all but 12 took plea deals; the remaining 12 went to trial. The size of the scandal has been described as one of the largest in United States education history.

The scandal thrust the debate over using high-stakes testing to hold educators accountable, mandated by the 2001 No Child Left Behind Act, into the national spotlight. Teachers who confessed to cheating blamed "inordinate pressure" to meet targets set by the district and said they faced severe consequences such as a negative evaluation or termination if they didn't.

Prior to the scandal, the APS had been lauded for making significant gains in standardized test scores. Between 2002 and 2009, eighth-graders' scores on the National Assessment of Educational Progress reading test jumped 14 points, the highest of any urban area. Superintendent Beverly Hall, who served from 1999 to 2010, was named Superintendent of the Year in 2009. The GBI's report said Hall "knew or should have known" about the scandal. Hall's lawyer has denied she had any knowledge of cheating practices. In 2013, she was indicted in relation to her role in the matter.

== Trial ==
The trial began on September 29, 2014, presided over by Fulton County Superior Court Judge Jerry Baxter. It was the longest criminal trial in Georgia history, lasting eight months. The lead prosecutor was Fani Willis. Before the end of the trial, the superintendent at the center of the scandal, Beverly Hall, died of breast cancer, aged 68.

On April 1, 2015, eleven of the twelve defendants were convicted on racketeering charges under the Georgia RICO Act. One teacher was found not guilty on all charges.

Nine of the 11 educators convicted of racketeering appealed. Two of those nine went directly to the appeals court, lost, and reported for prison in October 2018.

== Art & adaptation ==
=== Wrong Answer ===
In 2015, it was announced that Ryan Coogler would work with Michael B. Jordan in an upcoming film, Wrong Answer, based on the Atlanta Public Schools cheating scandal. As of 2026, the film had not yet been made.

=== Ranked ===
The Atlanta Public Schools cheating scandal was an inspiration for Ranked, a musical about academic pressure in school. Kyle Holmes (book) and David Taylor Gomes (music & lyrics) cite the scandal as one of their main inspirations for a storyline that featured adults cheating on behalf of students. The show opened at Granite Bay High School three weeks after Operation Varsity Blues charges were made public. The timing of the musical's debut in relation to the scandal was serendipitous, and earned the high school national attention.
