= Georgia First Offender Act =

The Georgia First Offender Act (Georgia Code § 42-8-60) is a legal resource for certain first time criminal offenders to not plead guilty, and have their records expunged if they comply with the law's provisions. A defendant may be sentenced under the First Offender Act only once; individuals who have previously received first offender treatment are not eligible to do so again. Upon successful compliance with this law, the defendant's criminal record is expunged on application to the court.
