= Scott F. McAfee =

American judge (born 1989)

Scott McAfee

Judge on the Fulton County Superior Court
- Incumbent
- Assumed office February 1, 2023
- Appointed by: Brian Kemp
- Preceded by: Christopher Brasher

Inspector General of Georgia
- In office April 1, 2021 – February 1, 2023
- Governor: Brian Kemp
- Preceded by: Deb Wallace
- Succeeded by: Nigel Lange

Personal details
- Born: 1988 or 1989 (age 36–37)
- Children: 2
- Education: Emory University (BA); University of Georgia (JD)

Scott F. McAfee is an American judge serving on the Fulton County Superior Court in Georgia since 2023. Judge McAfee was the Georgia inspector general from 2021 to 2023. Prior to his current appointment, Judge McAfee served as a senior assistant district attorney in Fulton County and an assistant United States Attorney for the Northern District of Georgia.

In August 2023, McAfee garnered national attention when he was assigned to preside over the Fulton County district attorney's criminal racketeering case against Donald Trump.

== Early life and education ==
McAfee was born in 1988 or 1989. He was raised in Kennesaw, Georgia. He is an Eagle Scout and graduate of North Cobb High School. McAfee received a cello scholarship to play in the Emory University symphony orchestra. In 2010, he completed a bachelor's degree in political science and music.

In 2012, McAfee was a judicial intern for Georgia Supreme Court justice Keith R. Blackwell. He also interned for justice David Nahmias. In 2013, he graduated from the University of Georgia School of Law, cum laude. While in law school, he was the vice president of the school's Federalist Society chapter, treasurer of Law Republicans and inducted into The Order of Barristers.

== Career ==
McAfee was an assistant district attorney in the Barrow County, Piedmont Judicial Circuit. He joined the office of the district attorney in Fulton County in April 2015, initially working on the early stages of criminal cases. He later was promoted to working as a prosecutor in the complex trial division, which was then headed by prosecutor Fani Willis, who was later elected as Fulton County district attorney. McAfee was eventually promoted to senior assistant district attorney in the major case division, where he prosecuted felony cases including armed robbery and murder.

In 2019, McAfee was appointed as an assistant United States Attorney for the United States District Court for the Northern District of Georgia. He worked in the criminal division where he investigated and prosecuted drug trafficking organizations, fraud, and illegal firearms possession. On April 1, 2021, Georgia governor Brian Kemp appointed McAfee as the state inspector general, tasked with overseeing fraud and corruption within Georgia's executive branch.

=== State judge in Fulton County ===
In December 2022, Kemp appointed McAfee to the Fulton County Superior Court following Christopher S. Brasher's retirement. He was sworn in on February 1, 2023.

In May, 2024, McAfee won the election to a full four-year term as a state judge.

=== The State of Georgia v. Donald J. Trump, et al ===
In August, 2023, McAffee was assigned to preside over the racketeering case, The State of Georgia v. Donald J. Trump, et al, Case # 23SC188947, in which former President Donald Trump and 18 co-defendants are charged with conspiring to overturn the 2020 Georgia presidential election results. Fani Willis was the state prosecutor of that case.

Appellate Case # A24I016

On December 16, 2024, The Georgia Court of Appeals canceled the oral arguments without explanation; The ruling was based solely on legal filings:

"After carefully considering the trial court’s findings in its order, we conclude that it erred by failing to disqualify DA Willis and her office”, (referring to an earlier ruling that allowed Willis to remain on the case)… McAfee’s decision did not prevent the “appearance of impropriety… The remedy crafted by the trial court to prevent an ongoing appearance of impropriety did nothing to address the appearance of impropriety that existed at times when DA Willis was exercising her broad pretrial discretion about who to prosecute and what charges to bring… While we recognize that an appearance of impropriety generally is not enough to support disqualification, this is the rare case in which disqualification is mandated and no other remedy will suffice to restore public confidence in the integrity of these proceedings."

On September 16, 2025, the Georgia Supreme Court denied certiorari, and the Fulton County DA's office's disqualification from the case was finalized. The Prosecuting Attorneys' Council of Georgia is now responsible for the case until a new prosecutor is found.

Willis had been under scrutiny over her relationship with a special prosecutor on the case, Nathan Wade.

Recovery of legal fees

A 2025 Georgia law permits defendants in dismissed cases, in which the prosecutor has been disqualified for misconduct, to seek relief as to reimbursement of attorney fees with taxpayer funds.

As of early 2025, President Trump had paid about $2.7 million to his lead attorneys; the Georgia Republican Party had paid about $2 million for other defendants, according to the Atlanta Journal-Constitution.

== Personal life ==
As of 2021, McAfee is a volunteer scuba diver at the Georgia Aquarium and captains an Atlanta Lawn Tennis Association tennis team. He is married and has two children.
