= Impersonating a public servant =

Crime that involves pretending to hold a public office

Impersonating a public servant, impersonating a public officer or impersonating a public official is a crime or misdemeanor in several jurisdictions. It consists of pretending to hold a public office and exercise that authority or attempt to induce another person to do something. There have for example been charges for impersonating a fire inspector, a city code compliance officer, a child protective services official, and ICE agents.

== See also ==
- Police impersonation
- Military impostor
