= Fani Willis =

American attorney (born 1971)

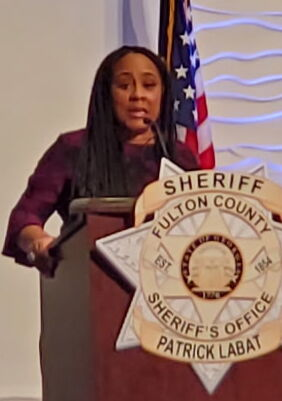
- Willis in 2024

District Attorney of Fulton County
- Incumbent
- Assumed office January 1, 2021
- Preceded by: Paul Howard

Personal details
- Born: Fani Taifa Floyd; October 27, 1971 (age 55) Inglewood, California, U.S.
- Party: Democratic
- Spouse: Fred Willis (m. 1996; div. 2005)
- Children: 2
- Education: Howard University (BA); Emory University (JD)
- Website: Office website Campaign website

Fani Taifa Willis (née Floyd; /fɑːniː/, FAH-nee; born October 27, 1971) is an American attorney. She is the district attorney of Fulton County, Georgia, which contains most of Atlanta, serving since 2021. She is the first woman to hold the office in Fulton County.

Willis investigated the 2020 presidential election in Georgia, which resulted in indictments against Donald Trump and 18 alleged co-conspirators on charges of racketeering and other crimes, but was subsequently disqualified from the case over personal improprieties and conflicts of interest, ultimately leading to the dismissal of all charges. Willis also investigated and prosecuted rapper Young Thug and members of his YSL record label on charges of racketeering and gang-related crimes in violation of Georgia's RICO Act.

== Early life and education ==
Willis was born in Inglewood, California. Her father, John C. Floyd III, was a founder of a faction of the Black Panthers but grew disillusioned by the movement's infighting. When Willis was in the first grade, her family moved to Washington, D.C., where her father practiced law as a criminal defense attorney. Her parents divorced and her mother eventually moved back to California. Willis mostly stayed with her father.

She graduated from Regina High School, in Maryland, an all-girls Catholic High School that closed in 1989. Willis studied political science at Howard University, graduating cum laude in 1993, then moved to Atlanta to attend Emory University School of Law, graduating in 1996 with a Juris Doctor.

== Early career ==
Willis's first government job was as a solicitor, prosecuting misdemeanors and city ordinance violations. She spent 16 years as a prosecutor in the Fulton County District Attorney's office. Her most prominent case was her prosecution of the Atlanta Public Schools cheating scandal. Willis, an assistant district attorney at the time, served as lead prosecutor in the 2014 to 2015 trial of twelve educators accused of correcting answers entered by students to inflate the scores of state administered standardized tests. Eleven of the twelve were convicted of racketeering under Georgia's RICO statute in April 2015.

In 2018, she went into private practice. That year, she ran for a seat on the Fulton County Superior Court, and lost. In 2019, Willis became Chief Municipal Judge for South Fulton, Georgia.

== District attorney of Fulton County ==
In 2020, Willis was elected district attorney for Fulton County, defeating Paul Howard Jr., a six-term incumbent and her former boss. In this role she is known for successfully using Georgia's RICO statute to prosecute non-mobsters, and, as of 2023, is using the same statute to prosecute former president Donald Trump and 18 alleged co-conspirators.

In 2022, an employee in the Fulton County District Attorney's Office alleged that Willis fired her for uncovering plans to misuse federal grant funding. In 2024, the House Judiciary Committee subpoenaed Willis regarding the former employee's whistleblower complaint after a taped conversation of the employee discussing the alleged misuse of federal funds with Willis was released publicly. The committee gave Willis a deadline of February 23. Willis said that the employee was "terminated for cause" and that the $488,000 in federal grant funding was utilized appropriately.

In November 2024, Willis won her reelection bid. Earlier, in the Democratic Party primary election, she defeated Christian Wise Smith. By October, Willis had raised over $2 million. In the general election, she defeated Republican Courtney Kramer, a former Trump intern.

=== 2020 election influence investigation ===
On February 10, 2021, Willis launched a criminal investigation into Donald Trump's attempts to influence Georgia election officials—including the governor, the attorney general, and Secretary of State Brad Raffensperger via a telephone call—to "find" enough votes to override Joe Biden's win in that state and thus undo Biden's victory in the 2020 presidential election. In January 2022, she requested a special grand jury to consider charges of election interference by Trump and his allies. In May, a 26-member special grand jury was given investigative authority and subpoena power and tasked with submitting a report to the judge and Willis on whether a crime was committed.

Willis sent target letters to people being investigated related to the fake electors plot. These include two Republican officials—State Senator Brandon Beach and David Shafer, chairman of the Georgia Republican Party—and the 16 people who falsely presented themselves as electors. She also sent a target letter to State Senator Burt Jones, but then a judge ruled she could not target Jones due to a conflict of interest which was created by Willis hosting a fundraiser for the Democratic candidate for lieutenant governor.

After hearing from 75 witnesses—including former US Senator Kelly Loeffler, former White House Counsel Pat Cipollone, and possibly Sidney Powell—the special grand jury completed its work and was dissolved on January 9, 2023. On February 16, following a judge's order, parts of the report were released.

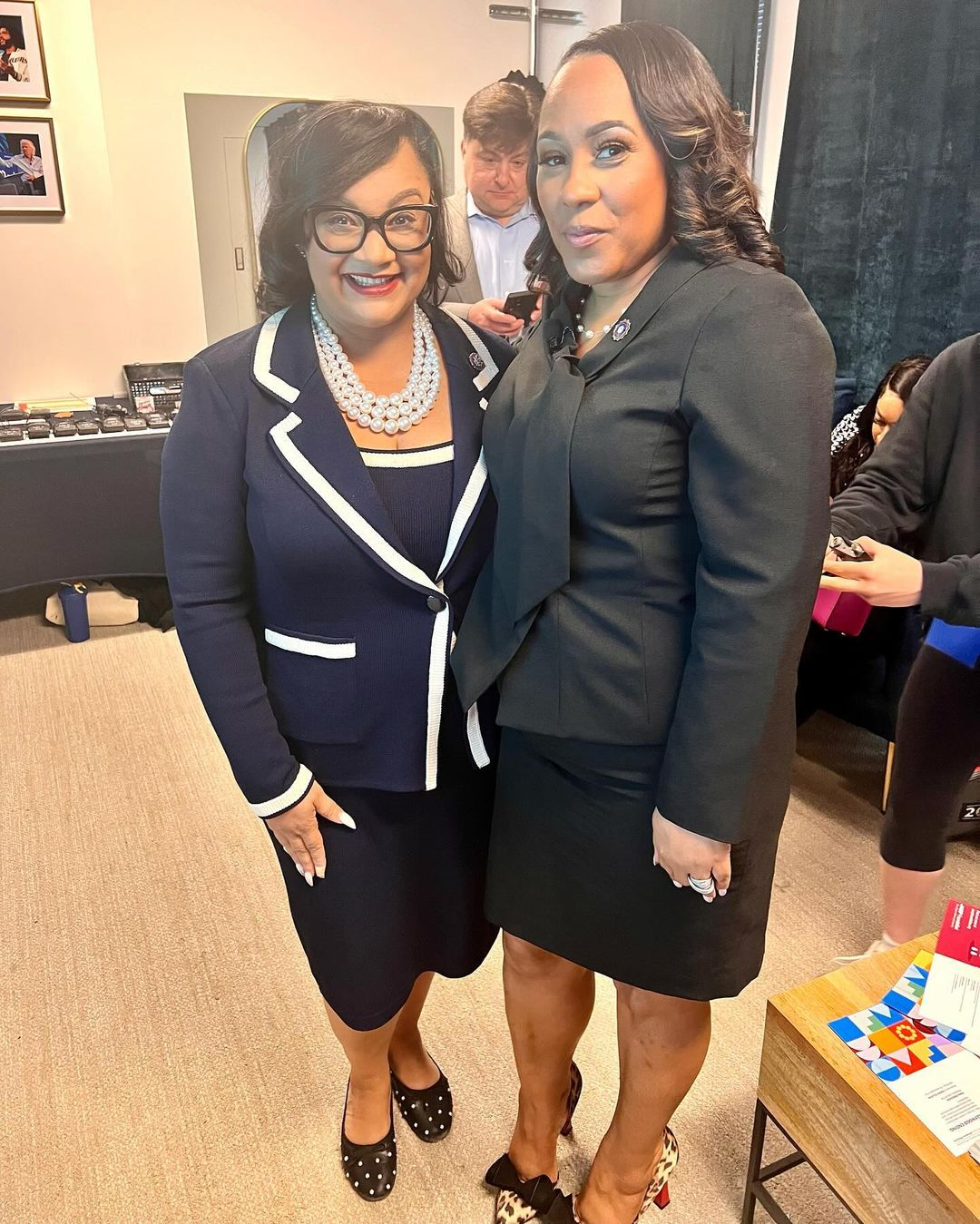
Fulton Country District Attorney Fani Willis (right) with U.S. Representative Nikema Williams, attending the Global Women's Summit, 2023

Willis' office indicted Trump and 18 others on 41 charges on August 14, 2023, including 13 charges against Trump. In 2024, Judge Scott McAfee quashed 6 charges, including 3 against Trump, while giving prosecutors the option to refile these charges.

On January 8, 2024, a defendant filed a pre-trial motion to dismiss the indictment and disqualify Willis and her office from prosecuting the RICO case against them due to Willis having a conflict of interest related to her personal relationship with lead prosecutor Nathan Wade. On February 15, 2024, Judge Scott F. McAfee started an evidentiary hearing, then ruled on March 15 that either Willis—along with her office—or Wade must leave the case, because their relationship brought about a "significant appearance of impropriety, and an odor of mendacity remains", McAfee wrote. He found no conflict of interest as there was insufficient evidence Willis had benefited financially. Nathan Wade resigned from the case a few hours after the judge's ruling "to move this case forward as quickly as possible." In May 2024, the Georgia Court of Appeals agreed to hear an appeal to revisit whether Willis should be removed too. On December 19, the Georgia Court of Appeals ruled that Willis alongside her office were to be removed for an appearance of impropriety. Willis' office appealed to the Supreme Court of Georgia, but on September 16, 2025, the court denied certiorari. This finalized the Fulton County DA's office's disqualification from the case. Willis said her office would transfer the case file and evidence to the Prosecuting Attorneys' Council of Georgia, which on November 14 announced that its executive director, Pete Skandalakis, would be the new prosecutor. On November 26, 2025, Skandalakis informed the court he would be dropping the charges, saying the case was "without precedent". Judge McAfee then dismissed the case.

On January 8, 2025, Fulton County Superior Court Judge Robert McBurney ordered Willis' office to pay over $20,000 to Judicial Watch for falsely claiming they did not possess any documents showing communication with the United States House Select Committee on the January 6 Attack. In a separate finding, Willis was ordered to turn over documents to a defendant and pay over $54,000 in attorneys' fees for violations of Georgia's Open Records Act, with Fulton County Superior Court Judge Rachel Krause describing Willis' violations of the act as "intentional, not done in good faith, and were substantially groundless and vexatious".

=== Atlanta gang indictments ===
In May 2022, Willis's office indicted Young Thug and 28 members of his YSL record label for gang-related crimes under Georgia's RICO statute. The trial began on November 27, 2023. The case would go on to become the longest in Georgia's history. On October 31, 2024, Young Thug entered a guilty plea as part of a plea agreement. He was given 15 years of probation and released from custody. Willis's office released a statement on the plea deal.

== Personal life ==
On the day she took the Georgia bar exam, Willis met Fred Willis, who was working an extra job as a videographer. They married in 1996 and have two daughters. They divorced in 2005.
