= Georgia RICO (Racketeer Influenced and Corrupt Organizations) Act =

Georgia state law

Georgia General Assembly
- Citation: GA Code Title 16 Chapter 14 (2024)
- Passed: March 20, 1980; 45 years ago
- Signed by: George Busbee
- Signed: 1980
- Bill citation: H.B. 803
- Status: In force

The Georgia RICO (Racketeer Influenced and Corrupt Organizations) Act is a law in the U.S. state of Georgia that makes a form of racketeering a felony. Originally passed on March 20, 1980, it is known for being broader than the corresponding federal law, such as not requiring a monetary profit to have been made via the action for it to be a crime.

It has been used in several high-profile prosecutions, including in the 2009 Atlanta Public Schools cheating scandal, against Donald Trump and others for attempts to overturn the 2020 U.S. presidential election in Georgia, and against Young Thug and other YSL Records members.

== Provisions ==
The Georgia act was based on the federal Racketeer Influenced and Corrupt Organizations Act of 1970, but the Georgia act was written to be broader. While the federal act requires an extended pattern of crime by multiple individuals through a criminal enterprise, under the Georgia act only one individual may constitute a criminal enterprise. Additionally, the enterprise as a whole must commit only two interrelated crimes towards a common goal. The Georgia act also has a wider range of underlying crimes than the federal act.

Violation of the act is a felony, which provides for a prison term of 5–20 years; a fine of three times the amount of money gained from the criminal activity, but no less than $25,000; or both.

== History ==
The Georgia RICO Act was passed in 1980. One of the first notable uses of the law was in 1983, when three members of the Dixie Mafia were prosecuted and found guilty in Monroe. Upon appeal, the Supreme Court of Georgia ruled in Chancey v. State, 256 Ga. 415 (1986), that the RICO Act was not unconstitutional. Its use became more routine in the late 1980s.

While it was intended to be used against organized crime and street gangs, its scope soon expanded. In 2010, four members of the Final Exit Network were tried for involvement in an assisted suicide and evidence tampering. In 2013, 35 Atlanta Public Schools educators were indicted for racketeering in the Atlanta Public Schools cheating scandal. This led to an eight-month trial, the longest criminal trial in Georgia's history, in which 11 of the 12 defendants who went to trial were convicted, with the rest pleading guilty.

In 2015, a former Georgia Aquarium employee pleaded guilty for repeatedly processing fraudulent refunds and stealing the money, as did three Cherokee County court reporters for illegally spacing their transcripts to increase the number of pages, and for billing for nonexistent pages and transcripts. In 2018, a married couple were charged under the Georgia RICO Act for providing illegal, unlicensed dental services and fraudulently billing insurance companies. In 2022, several people involved with YSL Records including Young Thug and Gunna were indicted for allegedly running the music label as a criminal street gang. In a case argued by the state commissioner of labor, the Georgia Supreme Court held that "the [Georgia] RICO act includes as a crime a reelection campaign by the holder of public office in which 2 or more similar or interrelated predicate offenses specified in the act are committed."

The 2023 election racketeering prosecution of Donald Trump and others alleges a criminal enterprise to overturn the 2020 U.S. presidential election in Georgia. Also in 2023, RICO charges were used against 61 members of the Stop Cop City protest movement.
