= United States Justice Department investigation into attempts to overturn the 2020 presidential election =

Attempts to overturn the 2020 United States presidential election
- The electoral map for the 2020 election. Blue denotes the 306 electoral votes for Biden, while red denotes the 232 electoral votes for Trump.
- Date: Main phase: November 4, 2020 – January 7, 2021 (2 months and 3 days); Post-inauguration audits: January 7, 2021 – present (5 years, 9 months, 3 weeks and 1 day)
- Location: Pennsylvania, Georgia, Michigan, Wisconsin, Arizona, Nevada, and Washington, D.C.
- Caused by: Fabricated claims of electoral fraud
- Result: Failure to overturn election; Donald Trump supporters attack United States Capitol; Second impeachment of Donald Trump

The United States Justice Department investigation into attempts to overturn the 2020 presidential election began in early 2021 with investigations and prosecutions of hundreds of individuals who participated in the January 6, 2021 attack on the United States Capitol. By early 2022, the investigation had expanded to examine Donald Trump's inner circle, with the Justice Department impaneling several federal grand juries to investigate the attempts to overturn the election. Later in 2022, a special counsel was appointed.

On August 1, 2023, Trump was indicted. The indictment also described six alleged co-conspirators. Following Trump's election to the presidency in November 2024, the case was dismissed at the request of special counsel Jack Smith, who cited the DOJ's policy of not prosecuting sitting Presidents. In January 2025, the special counsel report was released, in which "the Office assessed that the admissible evidence was sufficient to obtain and sustain a conviction at trial."

== Background ==
On January 7, when asked at a press conference whether the speakers at the rally prior to the Capitol attack were being investigated for their remarks, Acting District of Columbia U.S. Attorney Michael R. Sherwin stated "Yes, we are looking at all actors here, not only the people that went into the building, but . . . were there others that maybe assisted or facilitated or played some ancillary role in this. We will look at every actor and all criminal charges." On the same day, Acting U.S. Attorney General Jeffrey A. Rosen announced that Justice Department prosecutors were working with the United States Capitol Police, the Federal Bureau of Investigation, the Bureau of Alcohol, Tobacco, Firearms and Explosives, and Metropolitan Police Department of the District of Columbia to gather and assess evidence to identify, arrest, and charge the perpetrators of the attack, while the Justice Department announced the next day that 40 individuals had been charged in the District of Columbia Superior Court, that additional complaints had filed, and that investigations were ongoing. On January 13, Rosen announced that more than 70 individuals had been charged and that the department had opened more than 170 investigations. However, in February 2021, the Department of Justice chose not to investigate claims made by Trump supporters that they had submitted fake electors, but it began considering the matter toward the end of the year. In April 2022, the FBI began investigating the fake elector scheme.

The Department of Justice (DOJ) is probing Trump's months-long efforts to overturn the 2020 election. This includes efforts by Trump and his allies to:

- set up the Save America PAC following the election loss
- falsely declare that the election was rigged
- pressure the Justice Department to assist in declaring him president
- set up the fake electors scheme that created and submitted fraudulent elector slates with the intent that vice president Mike Pence would certify their votes on January 6, 2021
- support the events of January 6 itself (potential charges: seditious conspiracy and conspiracy to obstruct a government proceeding)
- take legal actions to support these activities
- receive funding to support these activities

Before the indictment was issued, possible criminal charges for Trump were anticipated. These included obstruction of the electoral certification proceedings, which could carry a maximum sentence of 20 years; "dereliction of duty" in not stopping the riot, especially given testimony from his inner circle who say he was repeatedly advised to stop it; and seditious conspiracy. Convicting Trump of sedition would require proof that he “set out to break the law,” said former deputy assistant attorney general Elliot Williams. Other Republicans could face charges of wire fraud for telling lies in their fundraising efforts.

=== Other charges ===
Trump has been charged with crimes that are generally considered separate matters from the attempts to overturn the 2020 election. He was criminally charged related to an alleged hush-money payment made before the 2016 election. On March 30, 2023, he was indicted by a grand jury, and on April 4 he was arraigned. The Manhattan district attorney is the prosecutor. On June 8, 2023, he was indicted by a grand jury related to his handling of classified documents during and after his presidency.

=== Other background ===
The DOJ has the authority to open criminal investigations and bring criminal charges against political leaders. It did not ask the House select committee to halt its investigation into Trump's inner circle, at least not openly. The DOJ initially focused on prosecuting rioters, but by early 2022 it became clear that it was investigating Trump's allies too.

On July 26, 2022, it was first reported that the DOJ was examining Trump's actions as part of a criminal probe, and on August 4, 2022, it was reported that Trump's lawyers were speaking directly to the Justice Department. U.S. Attorney General Merrick Garland said "everyone, anyone who was criminally responsible" would be held accountable.

The DOJ did not break big news on this case before the 2022 U.S. midterm elections. The DOJ usually keeps its investigations relatively quiet within 60 days of an election if they appear related to political issues. Although this is not a written formal policy, it is a longstanding norm.

Though Trump has declared his 2024 campaign for president, this would not make him immune from charges. On November 11, 2022, former U.S. attorney Barbara McQuade told MSNBC's Katie Phang: "The idea that you can inoculate yourself from criminal charges by just declaring yourself a candidate for some high office is ludicrous."

== Criminal investigations ==
By March 2022, the DOJ had seated several grand juries, including one regarding the fake electors scheme, to help prosecutors decide whether to bring charges against Trump's inner circle. One grand jury issued subpoenas to several Trump associates involved in the planning and financing of the president's "Stop the Steal" rally that preceded the Capitol attack.

By June 2022, the Justice Department was issuing subpoenas to Republican officials in several states regarding the fake electors scheme. The next month, Pence's former chief of staff Marc Short and counsel Gregory Jacob testified to the grand jury under subpoena. Short and Jacob had advised Pence to ignore the false Pence Card theory promoted to him by Trump attorney John Eastman that asserted the vice president had the constitutional authority to change electoral votes as they were being certified.

On November 18, 2022, U.S. attorney general Merrick Garland appointed Jack Smith as special counsel for the Trump-related investigations including Trump's attempts to overturn the 2020 election and Trump's mishandling of classified documents. The special counsel does not have a deadline to complete his work and he need not publish a final report.

=== Subpoenas and interviews ===
Known subpoenas include:

- In early September 2022, over 30 people close to Trump were subpoenaed. They included Trump campaign manager Bill Stepien; Trump 2020 campaign's chief financial officer Sean Dollman; Ben Williamson, a deputy of Mark Meadows; and Trump lawyer Boris Epshteyn, whose phone was demanded. Mike Lindell was subpoenaed for information about Tina Peters, Belinda Knisley, Sandra Brown, Conan Hayes, Sherronna Bishop, and Douglas Frank. Lindell unsuccessfully challenged the seizure of his phone.
- On September 8, 2022, William Russell, former White House special assistant and deputy director of presidential advance, was subpoenaed.
- In early December 2022, Trump campaign officials received a four-page subpoena asking for information in "more than two dozen categories", including a question about whether anyone else is paying for their legal representation.
- In early December 2022, grand-jury subpoenas were sent to local officials in Arizona, Michigan, and Wisconsin. Some of the subpoenas were dated in late November.
- On December 9, 2022, a subpoena was issued to Georgia Secretary of State Brad Raffensperger, seeking records of any communications with Trump or his associates from June 1, 2020, until he left office. Raffensperger's office received the subpoena on December 12.

Trump's lawyers, to prevent information from being used against him, have tried to assert executive privilege and attorney-client privilege. They filed their arguments under seal. Their strategy was first reported in September 2022. Nonetheless, the Justice Department has managed to obtain some information from Trump's inner circle:

- On July 22, 2022, Marc Short, who was a top aide to Pence, and Greg Jacob, who was Short's counsel in the White House, testified before a grand jury.
- On September 2, 2022, former White House counsel Pat Cipollone and his former deputy Patrick Philbin testified to a grand jury under subpoena.
- On September 15, 2022, it was reported that Mark Meadows had complied with a subpoena.
- On October 6, 2022, Greg Jacob testified before the grand jury. According to CNN, it was "the first identifiable time" that this criminal investigation had "pierced" Trump's attempts at preserving "confidentiality" among former White House staff related to the 2020 election.
- On October 13, 2022, Marc Short, former chief of staff to Pence, testified before the grand jury.
- On December 6, 2022 Stephen Miller, former senior adviser to Trump, testified again after having testified the previous week. He had been subpoenaed months earlier. He appeared again before the grand jury in April 2023.
- In April 2023, former Department of Homeland Security official Ken Cuccinelli appeared before the grand jury for the second time.
- On April 13, 2023, former director of national intelligence John Ratcliffe testified before the grand jury.

On November 23, 2022, it was reported that Pence was ready to negotiate an agreement to testify before the DOJ.

On February 14, 2024, James Renner, one of the fake electors from Michigan, testified at a hearing. Charges against Renner had been dropped in 2023 after he made a deal to cooperate. The hearing was for several other fake electors from Michigan who faced forgery charges.

=== Other high-level actions ===
- On June 22, 2022, several FBI agents with a warrant approached John Eastman in public and confiscated his phone while others searched the home of Jeffrey Clark and confiscated his devices.
- On June 29, 2022, the FBI interviewed Trump's attorney, Justin Clark, regarding Steve Bannon's refusal to testify to the House committee.
- On August 9, 2022, the FBI seized the cell phone of Representative Scott Perry, who had previously been uncooperative with the House committee. Perry sued. Though he dropped his public lawsuit, he continued to argue with the DOJ in court proceedings under seal, claiming that the "speech or debate" clause of the Constitution ought to shield the information on his phone from seizure. In situations like this, DOJ's typical procedure was to have one warrant to image the phone and another warrant to access the data. On December 28, 2022, the judge ordered him to disclose 2,055 files and only allowed him to shield 161.
- On December 16, 2022, federal judge Beryl Howell unsealed her rulings from June and September of that year in which she had granted the DOJ access to emails and documents involving Jeffrey Clark, his aide Ken Klukowski, John Eastman and Scott Perry, finding they were not protected by attorney-client privilege. Her June ruling applied to 37 emails among the four men; she noted that investigators had prioritized seeing emails sent to and by Perry. The September ruling involved 331 documents from Clark, largely forming an autobiographical account of Trump's attempt to install him as acting attorney general, including an account of a pivotal Oval Office meeting with Trump and the top leaders of the DOJ.

== Role of the U.S. House select committee on January 6 ==
=== Background ===
The House select committee on January 6 interviewed over 1,000 witnesses. While the committee's investigation was ongoing, it shared certain information with the Justice Department: for example, the committee's suspicion of witness tampering in Trump's placing of a phone call to a witness (witness tampering is punishable by up to 20 years in prison). The committee began releasing transcripts on its website on December 19, 2022.

==== Justice Department requests for transcripts ====
The Justice Department sent a letter on April 20, 2022, asking for transcripts of past and future interviews. Thompson, the committee chair, told reporters he did not intend to give the Justice Department "full access to our product" especially when "we haven't completed our own work." Instead, the select committee negotiated for a partial information exchange. On June 15, the Justice Department repeated its request. They gave an example of a problem: The trial of the five Proud Boys indicted for seditious conspiracy had been rescheduled for the end of 2022 because prosecutors and defendants' counsel didn't want to start the trial without the relevant interview transcripts. On July 12, the committee announced it was negotiating with the Justice Department about the procedure for information-sharing and that the committee had "started producing information" related to the Justice Department's request for transcripts. But on November 30, at a press conference, U.S. Attorney General Merrick Garland repeated his request for "all" transcripts.

The committee had expressed concern about whether the information they've gathered could be useful to the DOJ's investigation and whether the DOJ is likely to act upon the information if they had it. In July 2022, Representative Thompson told CNN that they would likely "establish a procedure to look at some of the material" later that month. On September 13, Representative Thompson told reporters: “I think now that the Department of Justice is being proactive in issuing subpoenas and other things, I think it’s time for the committee to determine whether or not the information we’ve gathered can be beneficial to their investigation.” Another committee member, however, said the committee might not make decisions about sharing information until later in the year. On September 25, Representative Schiff expressed concern that the DOJ appears to be investigating "very slow[ly]" or else "very quietly", and on December 11, he similarly claimed that the committee's investigation has "been far out ahead" of DOJ's. On December 17, former federal prosecutor Shan Wu said: "DOJ has been kind of late to this party and they are playing catch-up".

=== Criminal referrals ===
On October 21, 2022, the committee subpoenaed Donald Trump for documents and testimony. Trump refused to comply, opening the possibility that the House could vote to hold him in contempt and the Justice Department could then charge him with criminal contempt of Congress. On November 11, his lawyers sued to block the subpoena. In their initial court filing, they characterized the committee's investigation as a "quasi-criminal inquest". On December 19, 2022, the committee criminally referred Trump to the DOJ for four suspected crimes.

- Obstruction of an Official Proceeding (18 U.S.C. § 1512(c))
- Conspiracy to Defraud the United States (18 U.S.C. § 371)
- Conspiracy to Make a False Statement (18 U.S.C. §§ 371, 1001)
- "Incite," "Assist" or "Aid and Comfort" an Insurrection (18 U.S.C. § 2383)

The lawyer John Eastman was also referred for two of those same charges: obstruction of an official proceeding and conspiracy to defraud the United States. On December 28, 2022, former U.S. Attorney Barbara McQuade said that, for those two charges, prosecutors must show that the perpetrators had "corrupt intent" and "knowledge of fraud" respectively. She suggested that prosecutors could cite Trump's expressed interest in blanket pardons as evidence that he was aware of his own guilt.

On December 29, 2022, John Dean, former White House counsel for Richard Nixon, said: "I think an overwhelming case — proof beyond a reasonable doubt — is out there against Trump."

In deciding whom to charge and what witnesses to call, DOJ will have to anticipate how they would argue or testify in court, which may not be clear from the committee's work alone. For example, during the committee's nine public hearings, witnesses were examined but not cross-examined, meaning the public did not hear lines of questioning that lawyers for the accused would be likely to make.

In April 2023, an appellate court said that the crime of obstruction does not have to involve document tampering. This reversed the decision of a U.S. district judge one year earlier.

== Role of the National Archives and Records Administration ==
In 2022, the Justice Department subpoenaed NARA twice, seeking documents about January 6.

On September 30, 2022, after the House Committee on Oversight and Reform had requested Trump administration records, NARA responded: "we do know that we do not have custody of everything we should." NARA, acknowledging DOJ's "ongoing investigation", did not publicly provide more detail.

== Related investigations ==
On December 22, 2022, former U.S. Attorney Joyce Vance told MSNBC that other investigations (apart from the January 6 investigation) might proceed relatively quickly. She said: "The Georgia district attorney is wrapping up her proceedings. The Mar-a-Lago documents situation ― where Trump took classified materials with him ― is extremely serious, and it’s the simplest kind of case to make. It’s not complicated like Jan. 6."

=== Georgia election investigation ===
Fani Willis, district attorney of Fulton County, Georgia, opened a criminal investigation in February 2021 regarding the presidential election in that state. One of the targets of her investigation is Rudy Giuliani, Trump's lawyer.

=== Trump's retention of government documents ===
While in office, Trump removed thousands of government documents and brought them to Mar-a-Lago. These documents were government property and should not have been stored in a private residence. After Trump left office in 2021, the National Archives and Records Administration (NARA) asked him to surrender the material, and he reportedly went through it. NARA negotiated with him and, in January 2022, recovered some of the material. They discovered CIA, FBI, and National Security Agency documents on topics of national security interest. The DOJ began an investigation and convened a grand jury in April. Trump was subpoenaed in May and turned over more documents in June. The FBI obtained a search warrant and searched Mar-a-Lago in August, at which time they recovered over 11,000 additional government records that Trump had not given to the government during his two previous opportunities. Across the January, June, and August 2022 interactions, the government obtained 325 documents with classification markings. As of September 16, 2022, investigators had not decided whether to pursue a criminal inquiry against Trump's lawyers Christina Bobb and Evan Corcoran.

From August 22 to December 12, 2022, Trump had an active lawsuit. This brought about the appointment of a special master to review the seized materials, interrupting the DOJ's access to those materials. The lawsuit was ultimately dismissed, and the special master's work was terminated.

=== New York investigations of the Trump Organization ===
In September 2022, New York attorney general Letitia James announced a lawsuit against Trump, his three oldest children, and the Trump Organization for fraud and misrepresentation, asserting that Trump "wildly exaggerated his net worth by billions of dollars". The suit seeks about $250 million in damages and the instatement of a five-year ban from real-estate transactions. Additionally, James referred the case to federal criminal prosecutors in Manhattan and the Internal Revenue Service. Her office had begun the investigation in March 2019.

On December 6, 2022, in a separate case, the Trump Organization was convicted of criminal tax fraud for their part in a 15-year scheme, in which executives' compensation went unreported and taxes were not paid.

=== Trump allies ===
On August 18, 2022, Allen Weisselberg, chief financial officer (CFO) of the Trump Organization, pleaded guilty to 15 felony charges for evading $344,745 in taxes over 15 years. As part of the guilty plea deal, he agreed to testify against The Trump Organization at trial. On December 6, 2022, the Trump Organization was convicted, making the company itself a felon. This could make it difficult for it to find business partners, thus impacting Donald Trump's personal finances.

On October 21, 2022, Steve Bannon was sentenced to four months in prison for criminal contempt of Congress, following his conviction in July 2022 of two counts of not complying with the House select committee's subpoena. Separately, he has been charged in New York state with fraud, money laundering, and conspiracy in connection with the "We Build The Wall" campaign.

== July 2024 Supreme Court ruling ==
On July 1, 2024, the U.S. Supreme Court ruled 6–3 in Trump v. United States that U.S. Presidents have immunity from criminal prosecution for "official acts" committed as president. Consequently, Trump can only be charged for acts considered "unofficial", i.e., personal.

The immunity question had delayed the election subversion case. Following the ruling, the case was sent back to the D.C. Circuit Court.

On July 2, DOJ said it would continue to prosecute the case, as its longstanding policy prevents it from prosecuting only "sitting presidents". Were Trump to be elected in November, he would not become a sitting president until his inauguration in January 2025.
