= Trump fake electors plot =

2020 U.S. Republican election fraud scheme

The Trump fake electors plot was an attempt by U.S. president Donald Trump and associates to have him remain in power after losing the 2020 United States presidential election. After the results of the election determined Trump had lost, he, his associates, and Republican Party officials in seven battleground states – Arizona, Georgia, Michigan, Nevada, New Mexico, Pennsylvania, and Wisconsin – devised a scheme to submit fraudulent certificates of ascertainment to falsely claim Trump had won the Electoral College vote in crucial states. The plot was one of Trump and his associates' attempts to overturn the 2020 United States presidential election.

The intent of the scheme was to pass the illegitimate certificates to then-Vice President Mike Pence in the hope he would count the fake electoral college ballots, rather than the authentic certificates, and thus overturn Joe Biden's victory. This scheme was defended by a fringe legal theory developed by Trump attorneys Kenneth Chesebro and John Eastman, detailed in the Eastman memos, which claimed a vice president has the constitutional discretion to swap official electors with an alternate slate during the certification process, thus changing the outcome of the electoral college vote and the overall winner of the presidential race. The scheme came to be known as the Pence Card.

By June 2024, dozens of Republican state officials and Trump associates had been indicted in four states for their alleged involvement. The federal Smith special counsel investigation investigated Trump's role in the events. According to testimony, Trump was aware of the fake electors scheme, and knew that Eastman's plan for Pence to obstruct the certification of electoral votes was a violation of the Electoral Count Act.

Trump's personal attorney, Rudy Giuliani, a "central figure" in the plot, coordinated the scheme across the seven states. In a conference call on January 2, 2021, Trump, Eastman, and Giuliani spoke to some 300 Republican state legislators in an effort to persuade them to convene special legislative sessions to replace legitimate Biden electors with fake Trump electors based on unfounded allegations of election fraud. Trump pressured the Justice Department to falsely announce it had found election fraud, and he attempted to install a new acting attorney general who had drafted a letter falsely asserting such election fraud had been found, in an attempt to persuade the Georgia legislature to convene and reconsider its Biden electoral votes.

Trump and Eastman asked Republican National Committee chair Ronna McDaniel to enlist the committee's assistance in gathering fake "contingent" electors. A senator's chief of staff tried to pass a list of fraudulent electors to Pence minutes before the vice president was to certify the election. The scheme was investigated by the January 6 committee and the Justice Department. The January 6 committee's final report identified lawyer Kenneth Chesebro as the plot's original architect. On October 20, 2023, Chesebro pleaded guilty in the state of Georgia to conspiring to file a false document and was sentenced to five years of probation.

== Background ==
The 2020 US presidential election was held on November 3, 2020. Soon after, Trump began baselessly questioning the legitimacy of the election. On November 7, major news organizations called the election for Biden, and he gave a victory speech that evening. Trump refused to concede and continued to express doubt over the election results.

=== Trump's refusal to leave office ===
The fake electors plot was in concert with Trump's refusal to ever leave office and the White House after the end of his term. Maggie Haberman has described how Trump initially recognized he had lost the election, but then expressed he would "never" leave:

Trump seemed to recognize he had lost to Biden. He asked advisers to tell him what had gone wrong. He comforted one adviser, saying, 'We did our best.' Trump told junior press aides, 'I thought we had it,' seemingly almost embarrassed by the outcome, according to Haberman.

Then his attitude seemed to change:

"I'm just not going to leave," Trump told one aide, according to Haberman. "We're never leaving," Trump told another. "How can you leave when you won an election?"... He was even overheard asking the chair of the Republican National Committee, Ronna McDaniel, "Why should I leave if they stole it from me?"

This was confirmed by the testimony of Jenna Ellis in the Georgia election racketeering prosecution. In December 2020, after Trump lost the election, while he was standing in a hallway near the Blue Room of the White House, Dan Scavino told Ellis that Trump would refuse to leave office. Ellis recalled: "And he said to me, you know, in a kind of excited tone, 'Well, we don't care, and we're not going to leave.'" "The boss is not going to leave under any circumstances. We are just going to stay in power."

=== Plot for state legislatures to choose electors ===
On November 4, the day after the election, White House Chief of Staff Mark Meadows received a text message calling for an "aggressive strategy" of having the Republican-led legislatures of three uncalled states "just send their own electors to vote and have it go to the [Supreme Court]". The message was reportedly sent by Trump's secretary of energy, Rick Perry.

"We would just be sending in 'fake' electoral votes to Pence so that 'someone' in Congress can make an objection when they start counting votes, and start arguing that the 'fake' votes should be counted," Jack Wilenchik, a Phoenix-based lawyer who helped organize the pro-Trump electors in Arizona, wrote in a December 8, 2020, email to Boris Epshteyn, a strategic adviser for the Trump campaign.
In a follow-up email, Mr. Wilenchik wrote that "'alternative' votes is probably a better term than 'fake' votes," adding a smiley face emoji."

On November 5, Roger Stone dictated a message saying that "any legislative body" that has "overwhelming evidence of fraud" can choose their own electors to cast Electoral College votes. That same day, Donald Trump Jr. sent a text message to Meadows outlining paths to subvert the Electoral College process and ensure his father a second term. He wrote, "It's very simple. We have multiple paths. We control them all. We have operational control. Total leverage. Moral high ground. POTUS must start second term now." Trump Jr. continued, "Republicans control 28 states Democrats 22 states. Once again Trump wins", adding, "We either have a vote WE control and WE win OR it gets kicked to Congress 6 January 2021."

On November 6, Congressman Andy Biggs sent a text message to Meadows, asking about efforts to encourage Republican legislators in certain states to send alternate slates of electors, to which Meadows replied, "I love it." Then Arizona House Elections Committee Chair, Kelly Townsend, a longtime ally of Biggs, credited with introducing him to Donald Trump in 2011 when she led the Tea Party, sponsored a bill on January 5, 2021, to designate Arizona's electors to Trump even though the majority of Arizona's votes were for Joe Biden.

Senator Mike Lee and Meadows exchanged a series of text messages referring to Sidney Powell's alleged interest in pursuing a fake electors plot. On November 8, Lee wrote: "Sidney Powell is saying that she needs to get in to see the president, but she's being kept away from him. Apparently she has a strategy to keep things alive and put several states back in play. Can you help her get in?" Two days later, he texted Meadows that he found Powell to be "a straight shooter", though he raised doubts about her to Meadows after her November 19 press conference during which she described elaborate conspiracy theories. Lee sent a text to Meadows on December 8 hypothesizing: "If a very small handful of states were to have their legislatures appoint alternative slates of delegates, there could be a path", to which Meadows replied, "I am working on that as of yesterday." Cleta Mitchell, who participated in the Trump–Raffensperger phone call effort to reverse Georgia election results, testified to the January 6 committee that the alternate elector plot was "actually Mike Lee’s idea", telling Mitchell it would be "the sweet spot" to engage senate Republicans. The committee found that Lee later "expressed grave concerns" about the idea to a top Trump legal advisor as January 6 approached.

On November 9, Ginni Thomas, wife of Supreme Court Justice Clarence Thomas, emailed 29 Arizona lawmakers, including assembly speaker Russell Bowers and Shawnna Bolick, encouraging them to pick "a clean slate of Electors" and telling them that the responsibility was "yours and yours alone".

=== 1960 Hawaii electors dispute ===
In 1960, Hawaii experienced a close presidential race between Richard Nixon and John F. Kennedy, and its electoral outcome was unclear by December 19, 1960, when electors were required to cast their votes, although the national race was already called for Kennedy regardless of Hawaii's results. Both Democratic and Republican elector slates were created, with the governor certifying the Republican electors, as Nixon was currently in the lead pending a recount. Democratic electors would also sign and deliver their own elector certificates and assert a Kennedy victory, using virtually the same language that the false Trump electors would later employ in 2020, with no caveats mentioned for the ongoing recount. After the recount, Hawaii flipped to Kennedy, and the governor certified a new slate of Democratic electors to send to Washington, D.C. On January 6, 1961, then vice president Nixon received all three slates of elector certificates and only certified the second, post-recount Democratic slate. Nixon stated that the event should not be used to establish a precedent. A court case from that incident resulted in a ruling that the ultimately certified Democratic electors were legitimate. A ruling or decision regarding the original, uncertified slate of Democratic electors was never made in Congress or court.

Chesebro and Trump campaign strategist Boris Epshteyn cited the Hawaii election as a precedent to justify their alternate electors plan in 2020, with Chesebro in particular claiming that it demonstrated that alternate slates of electors were permissible and that the deadline for the electoral results was not the December elector vote, but the certification on January 6. Others involved in the plan, particularly in Georgia, would later cite the initial, uncertified Democratic electors from 1960 in an effort to defend themselves from prosecution, saying that similarities in pending legal challenges in the 1960 and 2020 cases provided them with legal cover for their actions. Some differences between the 1960 and 2020 election included the predication of alternate electors on persistent false claims of nationwide election fraud in 2020, instead of an ongoing recount as in 1960. By contrast, alternate Trump electors would continue to meet even after recounts with no changed result. Other differences include the fact that the accepted 1960 Hawaiian Democratic elector slate was certified by the state's Republican governor, while none of the Trump alternate elector slates were endorsed by their respective states' governors, that Hawaii's election held considerably more doubt regarding the eventual victor, and the Trump alternate electors being part of a larger strategy to overturn the election results nationwide, rather than focusing on issues in a particularly close state. Recognizing that the alternate elector certificates might be legally challenged, the alternate Trump electors included contingent language in the elector certificates to avoid charges.

== Planning ==
Working as an outside advisor, attorney Kenneth Chesebro wrote multiple memos to Jim Troupis, a former Wisconsin judge who represented the Trump campaign in Wisconsin. The first memo is dated November 18, the second is dated December 6, and the third is dated December 9, 2020. A fourth memo, addressed to Trump lawyer Rudy Giuliani, is dated December 13, 2020. The memos outlined a plan to maintain Trump's position as president after his first term expired on January 20, 2021.

Focused on challenging the Wisconsin vote, Chesebro argued in the November 18 memo that "the Presidential election timetable affords ample time for judicial proceedings." He asserted that January 6 was the only deadline that mattered for settling a dispute over a state's legal slate of electoral votes. Citing the 1960 United States presidential election in Hawaii as an example of a competing slate of electors, Chesebro suggested that the Trump campaign should submit their own electoral certificates in Wisconsin on December 14 in preparation for the scenario that a court decision, or a "state legislative determination", is made in their favor.

The December 6 memo expanded Chesebro's scope beyond Wisconsin into a national strategy. The strategy was to have Trump–Pence electors in six allegedly contested states submit their own "alternate" slates of purported electoral certificates in anticipation that Vice President Mike Pence would falsely claim unilateral authority to count the votes in his role as President of the Senate. Chesebro stated that he believed the strategy was "constitutionally defensible" but acknowledged that the Supreme Court might rule against it and said he was "not necessarily advising" it. The memo was nevertheless written with a sense of urgency to act, its title being "Important That All Trump-Pence Electors Vote on December 14." Chesebro concluded the memo in stating that it "seems advisable for the campaign to seriously consider" his suggested course of action. Chesebro believed that his plan would focus the public's attention on alleged "electoral abuses by the Democrats" and to "buy the Trump campaign more time to win litigation that would deprive Biden of electoral votes and/or add to Trump's column".

The December 9 memo largely focused on providing a "general overview" of the legal requirements regarding the submission of electoral votes, under both federal law and the respective laws of the six states "in controversy". Chesebro additionally commented that, in spite of having no involvement from "the governor[s] or any other state official[s]", the Trump campaign's purported "alternate" electoral votes "might be eligible" for counting on January 6 if by then they were recognized "by a court, the state legislature, or Congress".

On December 13, 2020, Chesebro emailed a fourth memo to Giuliani and others, which further explained his legal and logistical arguments in regards to his "President of the Senate" strategy. Chesebro proposed a "chronology" of events where Pence would recuse himself from serving as the presiding officer of the United States Senate on January 6, claiming that the Electoral Count Act imposed duties on his role that go "beyond those set out in the Constitution", and that he would have a conflict of interest if he were to fill the role of senate president while being a candidate for the vice presidency. The votes would instead be opened by the president pro tempore, Chuck Grassley, or by "another senior Republican". During the counting procedure, the presiding officer would claim unilateral authority and obstruct the counting of the electoral votes of Arizona, arguing that the presence of both the Biden-Harris electoral votes and the Trump-Pence purported "alternate" electoral votes comprises a conflict of two competing slates of electors from the same state. The presiding officer would announce that Arizona would have to "rerun the election", "engage in adequate judicial review", or "have its legislature appoint electors", if it wanted to be represented in the electoral college results.

The memo presents what Chesebro claims is an originalist reading of the Twelfth Amendment to the United States Constitution. It is argued that the lack of an explicit granting of the vote-counting role to Congress implies that the power is instead held by the senate president, that Congress would not be able to act during a joint session, that Congress would not have enough time to deliberate over the vote-counting procedures, and that the vesting of the vote-counting role in Congress could potentially lead to a stalemate between the House and the Senate. As historical precedent, Chesebro cited the appointment of John Langdon as president pro tempore in 1789, which was recorded in the Annals of Congress as being for the purpose of "opening and counting the votes for President of the United States". Additionally, the memo claims that former vice presidents John Adams and Thomas Jefferson used their positions of senate president by invoking unilateral authority to count "improper" votes during the respective electoral counts of 1797 and 1801.

The House select committee on the January 6 attack concluded that Rudy Giuliani and Mark Meadows were involved in the early stages of the plan—as was Donald Trump, who asked on December 7 or 8 for research into whether a fake elector scheme would be possible, according to Trump campaign lawyer Joshua Findlay in his testimony to the committee. The committee wrote in its final report that Trump was "driving" the "fake elector plan" by December 7 or 8, and that he was collaborating "with Rudolph Giuliani on the plan's implementation" by December 13 or 14. Both Meadows and Giuliani were informed that a White House Counsel's Office review of the plans to use alternate electors concluded that the scheme was not legally sound.

In July 2022, Politico acquired an email that OANN anchor Christina Bobb sent to several Trump attorneys and allies. The email was dated December 13, 2020, the day before electors met across the country to certify their states' election results. It showed that Mike Roman, Trump's 2020 director of election day operations, had spoken with teams around the country focused on the effort to appoint false electors, reported developments back to her, which she then relayed to the email recipients. Those recipients included Giuliani, Jenna Ellis, Boris Epshteyn and one-time Trump attorneys Joe diGenova and his wife Victoria Toensing.

The New York Times obtained dozens of emails in July 2022 showing communications about the scheme among Trump associates in December 2020. The emails showed discussions of how to create lists of people who could baselessly claim to be electors in key states Trump had lost. One attorney in the detailed discussions, Jack Wilenchik, described to Epshteyn a strategy of "sending in 'fake' electoral votes to Pence so that 'someone' in Congress can make an objection when they start counting votes, and start arguing that the 'fake' votes should be counted." Wilenchik repeatedly referred to these electors as "fake", later suggesting they be referred to as "alternative", appending a smiley emoji.

One email informed many of the president's top advisers that naming Trump fake electors in Michigan was not possible due to the state Capitol building being closed due to pandemic restrictions. The emails showed that progress reports on the scheme were routed to Giuliani, and in one case to Meadows. Many of the emails went to Epshteyn, a close Trump advisor who was acting as a coordinator between people in the campaign, the White House and others. Epshteyn was also a regular point of contact for Eastman. The emails showed that Mike Roman played a significant role in finding ways to challenge the election results. Wilenchik wrote of a strategy by Kelli Ward, the Arizona Republican Party chair, "to keep it under wraps until Congress counts the vote Jan. 6th (so we can try to 'surprise' the Dems and media with it) – I tend to agree with her."

On December 13, 2020, Robert Sinners, the campaign's election operations director for Georgia, emailed state Republicans planning to cast alternate electors for Trump. Sinners wrote: "Your duties are imperative to ensure the end result – a win in Georgia for President Trump – but will be hampered unless we have complete secrecy and discretion." The email surfaced in June 2022.

The Trump campaign coordinated sending the alternate elector certificates to Pence by January 6, in time for the Congressional certification of electors. Federal law required the physical presence of elector certificates on the floor of Congress during certification. When the alternate certificates from Wisconsin and Michigan were running late, Trump campaign officials sent flights to Washington, D.C. with other false elector certificates from those states. Senator Ron Johnson and Representative Scott Perry, as well as GOP Congressional staff, took part in plans to deliver the fake certificates to Pence.

== Events in individual states ==
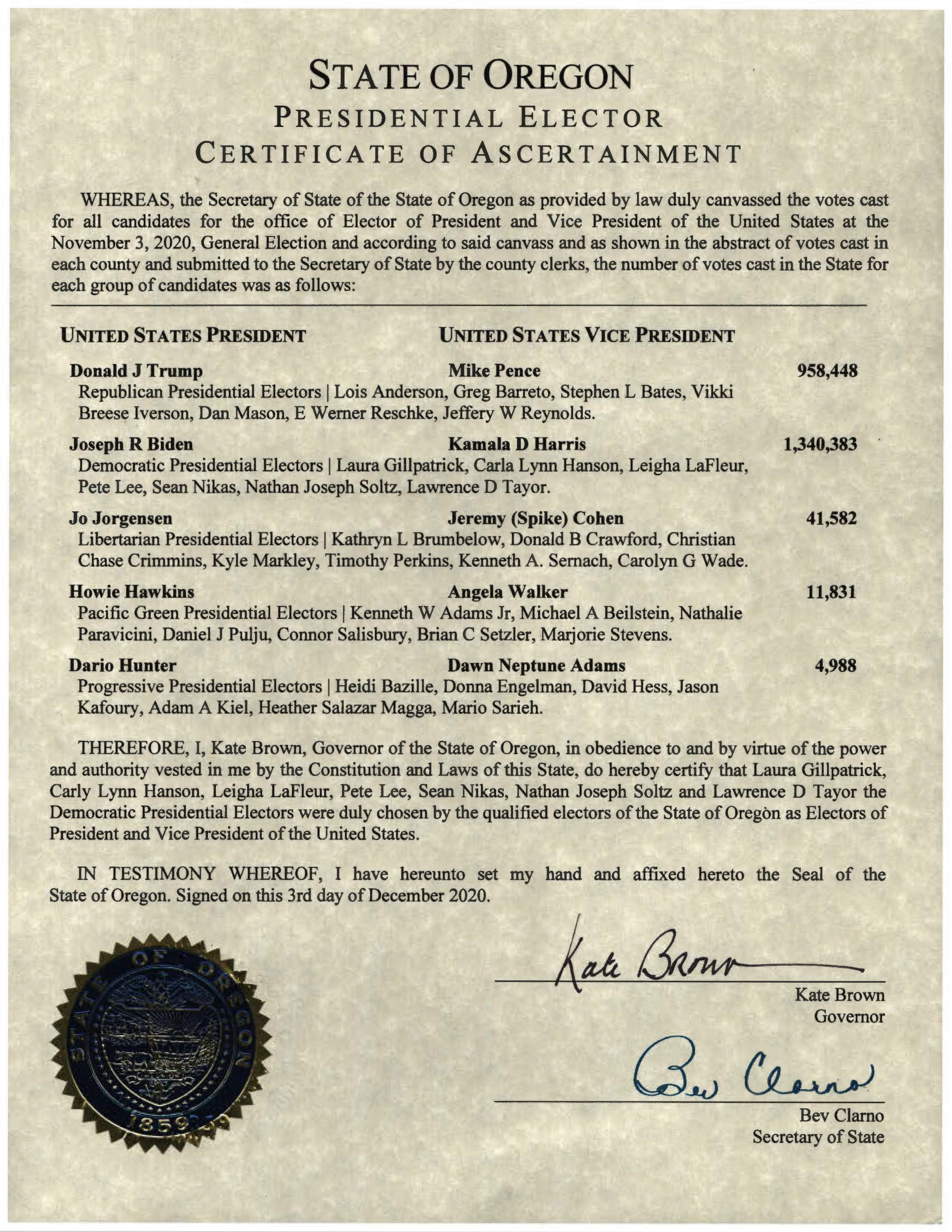
The authentic 2020 certificate of ascertainment from the state of Oregon

On December 14, in accordance with law, the local electors of the electoral college met in each state capital and in the District of Columbia and formalized Biden's victory, with 306 electoral votes cast for Biden and 232 electoral votes cast for Trump.

On the same day that the true electors voted, at the direction of Trump campaign officials, "alternate slates" of Republican electors convened in seven states, most of which Biden had won by a relatively small margin, (Arizona, Georgia, Michigan, Nevada, New Mexico, Wisconsin, and Pennsylvania) to sign false certificates of ascertainment. This was ostensibly in case Texas v. Pennsylvania ruled in favor of Trump. However, that case was thrown out on December 11, 2020, three days before the electoral vote was to occur, a fact that was withheld from most of the fake electors by Giuliani and Chesebro. In each case the false electors signed a facsimile of an Electoral College certificate of ascertainment, proclaiming Trump and Pence the victors, and sent it to the National Archives and to Congress.

The alternate elector certificates for Pennsylvania and New Mexico contained language indicating they would take effect only if the Trump campaign's challenges to the election results were sustained by the courts. In the other five states, the "alternate" certificates contained no indication that they were not genuine, and those states are prosecuting the alleged crime. These self-proclaimed electors have no legal standing, and the National Archives did not accept their documents, publishing the official (Biden) results from those states as the result of the election.

=== Arizona ===
In Arizona, the fake electors met on December 14, 2020, at the state Republican Party headquarters. The Arizona falsified electoral documents were produced and sent by a group that claimed to represent the "sovereign citizens of the Great State of Arizona". The document made in Arizona had a facsimile of the state seal. The Arizona Republican Party then posted on its Twitter account a video of party members signing the certificates, and issued a press release. Prior to January 6, 2021, Stop the Steal rally organizer and Arizona House Election Chair Kelly Townsend, attempted to compel fellow legislators to designate the State's electors to Donald Trump even though the count in Arizona showed that Biden received the majority votes. In 2022, it was revealed the FBI sought communications between Kelly Townsend and the alternate Trump electors, the Trump campaign, and the judicial or executive branches, but Townsend told the FBI by the time they contacted her with the subpoena, she no longer had her phone that contained those communications.

=== Georgia ===
The 16 potential electors for Trump in Georgia were chosen before the election, as is typical. After Biden won the election, and days before the scheduled casting of electoral votes, the Republican electors received calls asking them to come to the Capitol to cast "alternate" (fake) ballots. Four members of the Republican electoral slate declined to participate, including former U.S. Senator Johnny Isakson, and were replaced.

Georgia fake electors convened in a meeting room at the Georgia State Capitol at the same time the true electors were meeting in the Senate chamber. Unlike in some other states, one case, Trump v. Raffensperger, was still pending at the time. The falsified documents were then sent to the U.S. Senate and the National Archives by Giuliani and Chesebro's team.

=== Michigan ===
External videos
- Republicans try to deliver their own electoral votes to Michigan Capitol—Detroit Free Press

The Michigan fake electors met in the basement of the state Republican Party headquarters on December 14, 2020, after Michigan Republican Party chair Laura Cox successfully opposed a plan to have the false electors hide overnight in the Michigan State Capitol. They produced and signed multiple documents falsely stating they were the duly elected and qualified electors in the 2020 U.S. presidential election and containing electoral votes for Donald Trump. The documents were then sent to the U.S. Senate and National Archives, as well as the Office of the Federal Register, Michigan Secretary of State Jocelyn Benson, and the federal U.S. District Court for the Western District of Michigan.

Four fake electors later that day attempted to enter the Michigan State Capitol with State Representative Daire Rendon, appearing to present the falsified certificate to gain entry into the building and claiming to be true electors, but they were turned away by the Michigan State Police.

=== Nevada ===
On December 5, 2023, a grand jury indicted six Republicans, all of whom pleaded not guilty. The case was set to go to trial on January 13, 2025.

Clark County district judge Mary Kay Holthus dismissed the charges against the defendants on June 21, 2024, ruling the court lacked appropriate jurisdiction to hear the case. The charges were refiled in Carson City, Nevada in December 2024 to resolve the jurisdiction issue. On August 13, 2026, Judge Holthus dismissed the case again, agreeing with the defense that their plot was "designed to publicize their concerns about the election".

=== New Mexico ===
New Mexico's alternate elector certificates contained language that indicated they would only be valid in the event that Trump prevailed in litigation to be declared the winner of the 2020 election in New Mexico. New Mexico was an outlier among the seven states, as Biden won the solidly Democratic state by over 10 points.

=== Pennsylvania ===
Chesebro noted that advancing false electors in Pennsylvania was particularly "dicey", because state law required the governor, Democrat Tom Wolf, to approve electors. Some Republicans who volunteered as Trump electors were uncomfortable continuing to portray themselves as legitimate electors after Biden was declared the winner of the 2020 election in Pennsylvania. To placate their concerns, the alternate elector certificates were reworded to contain language indicating that they would only hold legitimacy if Trump prevailed in court efforts to overturn the election results.

=== Wisconsin ===
In Wisconsin, one of the ten fake electors was Robert F. Spindell, a member of the six-person Wisconsin Elections Commission. Spindell was appointed to the commission by Wisconsin Senate majority leader Devin LeMahieu; subsequent to the fake elector plot, LeMahieu reappointed Spindell to another six-year term.

In May 2022, a civil lawsuit was filed against Wisconsin's 10 fake electors and two attorneys who collaborated with them. After more than a year of discovery and filings, the 10 fake electors, including Spindell, agreed to a partial settlement of the case in December 2023. They acknowledged that their actions were "part of an attempt to improperly overturn the 2020 presidential election results." They further stated: "We hereby reaffirm that Joseph R. Biden Jr. won the 2020 presidential election and that we were not the duly elected presidential electors for the State of Wisconsin for the 2020 presidential election. We oppose any attempt to undermine the public's faith in the ultimate results of the 2020 presidential election." This settlement represented the first time that fake electors anywhere in the country had formally repudiated their electoral claims.

After Spindell acknowledged his part in filing fraudulent paperwork, the Wisconsin Secretary of State, Sarah Godlewski—in her capacity as the current holder of the office which had received that false paperwork—demanded that Spindell be removed from his seat on the Wisconsin Elections Commission by LeMahieu. LeMahieu, however, reiterated his support for Spindell.

Also in December 2023, CNN reported that Kenneth Chesebro, who was also a defendant in the previously mentioned civil suit, was cooperating with officials in Wisconsin, the first indication that a formal investigation was underway in the state.

In June 2024, Wisconsin attorney general Josh Kaul indicted Chesebro, Troupis, and Roman on felony forgery charges, alleging they delivered fake Wisconsin elector paperwork to a staffer for Republican Congressman Mike Kelly in an effort to have them given to Pence.

In December 2025, a Wisconsin judge ruled that there was enough evidence to send the felony forgery case to trial.

== Later developments ==
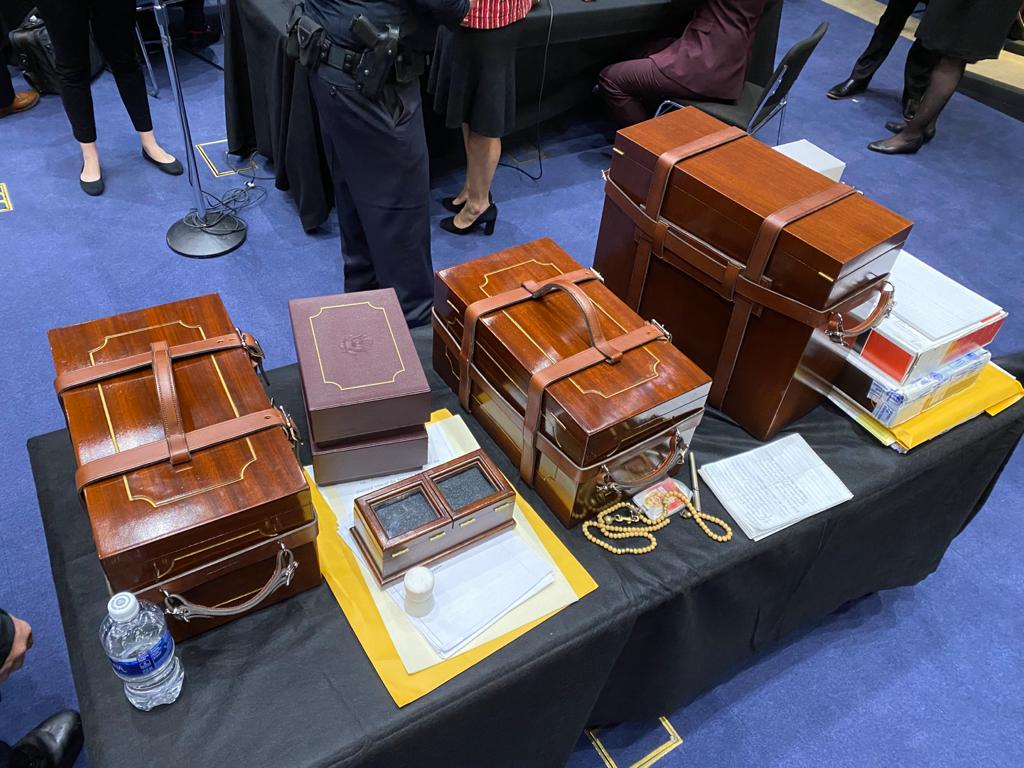
Boxes containing authentic electoral certificates

The "alternate slates" were part of the White House plan for contesting the election. As Trump advisor Stephen Miller described on television on December 14, the alternate electors were intended to replace those electors certified by their respective states based on election results. The strategy was explicitly spelled out in the John Eastman memo: the existence of "competing" slates of electors was intended to provide justification for Congress to disallow the results from the seven states. All of the alternate elector certificates were prepared with similar language, formatting, and fonts, as reported, thus indicating that the state actions were coordinated. The Washington Post and CNN reported in January 2022 that Giuliani led Trump campaign officials in coordinating the plan across the seven states.

Chesebro and Troupis met with Trump in the Oval Office on December 16. Troupis told the president that his chances of winning Wisconsin were over, but Chesebro said the fake electors gathered in Arizona and six other states still gave Trump an opening to continue challenging the results.

Epshteyn asserted the slates of alternate electors were not fraudulent and "it is not against the law, it is according to the law." He was among the members of a Trump team present in a Willard Hotel "command center" that sought to prevent Pence from certifying Biden's election on January 6.

Politico reported in July 2022 that Mike Roman, Trump's 2020 director of election day operations, delivered the fraudulent certificates to Matt Stroia, the then-chief of staff for congressman Mike Kelly. Stroia then directed a colleague to distribute copies on Capitol Hill. Kelly said Stroia had received the certificates but denied any involvement of his office in their distribution. Kelly was a Trump ally in the effort to overturn the 2020 election. The January 6 committee disclosed during a June 2022 hearing that Sean Riley, chief of staff to senator Ron Johnson, attempted to pass fraudulent elector certificates to a top Pence aide minutes before the vice president was to certify the election results, but was rebuffed. Johnson said his office received the certificates from Kelly's office and that his personal involvement lasted "a couple seconds".

On December 22, Ivan Raiklin, an associate of Michael Flynn and a former special forces officer who presented himself as a constitutional attorney, tweeted to Trump a two-page memo entitled, "Operation Pence Card", describing how the vice president might reject electors from states Biden won and in which Trump falsely alleged fraud. Trump retweeted the Raiklin tweet.

Jeffrey Clark, the Assistant Attorney General for the Environment and Natural Resources Division, was introduced to Trump by Republican congressman Scott Perry. Clark and Perry discussed a plan for Clark to draft a letter to Georgia officials stating the DOJ had "identified significant concerns that may have impacted the outcome of the election in multiple States", urging the Georgia legislature to convene a special session for the "purpose of considering issues pertaining to the appointment of Presidential Electors". Clark presented the draft letter on December 28 to acting Attorney General Jeffrey Rosen and his deputy Richard Donoghue for their signatures; they rejected the proposal and the letter was never sent. (Note: Multiple sources:)

Rosen and Donoghue also resisted pressure from Trump to announce the DOJ had found election fraud; attorney general Bill Barr had resigned days earlier after announcing that no election fraud of consequence had been found, telling Trump that allegations he and his associates espoused were "bullshit". Rosen and Donoghue declined Trump's request to "Just say that the election was corrupt + leave the rest to me and the R. Congressmen", according to notes Donoghue took during a phone call with the president. The continuing resistance culminated in an Oval Office meeting during which Trump proposed replacing Rosen with Clark, which was abandoned when Rosen advised the president that the proposal would trigger mass resignations at the DOJ.

ABC News chief Washington correspondent Jonathan Karl reported that on New Year's Eve 2020, White House chief of staff Mark Meadows sent a memo drafted by Trump attorney Jenna Ellis to a top Pence aide containing a detailed plan to overturn the election results. The plan entailed Pence returning the electoral results to six battleground states on January 6, with a deadline of January 15 for the states to return them. If any state did not return their electoral slate by that date, neither Trump nor Biden would hold a majority, so the election would be thrown to the House for a vote to determine the winner. Per the Constitution, in such a scenario the vote would be conducted on the basis of party control of state delegations to the federal House of Representatives, with Republicans holding 26 of 50, presumably giving Trump the victory.

On January 2, 2021, Trump, Giuliani, Eastman and others held a conference call with some 300 legislators of key states to provide them purported evidence of election fraud to justify calling special sessions of their legislatures in an attempt to decertify their slates of Biden electors. Three days later, dozens of lawmakers from five key states wrote Pence to ask him to delay the January 6 final certification of electors for ten days to allow legislators the opportunity to reconsider their states' certifications.

On January 5, congressman Jim Jordan forwarded to Meadows a text message he had received from Joseph Schmitz, a Trump 2016 campaign foreign policy advisor. Schmitz wrote that on January 6 Pence "should call out all electoral votes that he believes are unconstitutional as no electoral votes at all". Schmitz was previously a Bush administration Pentagon inspector general and a Blackwater executive.

Trump falsely insisted that Pence had the authority to reject Electoral College results, but Pence told the president on January 5, 2021, that he did not believe he did. While the January 6 attack was in progress, Trump tweeted:

Mike Pence didn't have the courage to do what should have been done to protect our Country and our Constitution, giving States a chance to certify a corrected set of facts, not the fraudulent or inaccurate ones which they were asked to previously certify. USA demands the truth!

Some in the crowd began chanting "hang Mike Pence!". Former White House aide Cassidy Hutchinson testified to the January 6 committee that Trump indicated his approval of the chant. After the attackers were expelled from the Capitol, Pence counted the authentic certificates to certify Biden's victory.

== Investigations ==
Despite assumptions about Eastman's role, the January 6 committee's final report, which was released on December 22, 2022, named lesser known lawyer Kenneth Chesebro as the plot's original proponent. Chesebro pleaded guilty to conspiracy charges in the Georgia election racketeering prosecution and by December 2023 was cooperating with similar investigations in at least four other states.

In early 2021, the watchdog group American Oversight obtained copies of the false documents from the National Archives via a Freedom of Information request; they published them on their website in March 2021. However, the documents were largely overlooked until the story was reported by Politico reporter Nicholas Wu in January 2022. Michigan attorney general Dana Nessel announced in January 2022 that after a months-long investigation into the Michigan certificate she had asked the Justice Department to open a criminal investigation, closing the Michigan investigation. Deputy attorney general Lisa Monaco days later confirmed the Justice Department was examining the matter. Nessel announced in January 2023 that she was reopening her investigation "because I don't know what the federal government plans to do."

The FBI's investigation into the fake elector scheme, internally designated "Arctic Frost," was opened on April 13, 2022, at the FBI's Washington Field Office. The investigation was transferred to Special Counsel Jack Smith's oversight in November 2022. The August 2022 seizure of Representative Scott Perry's cell phone was part of this investigation.

The FBI also served a search warrant on Nevada Republican Party chair Michael McDonald, and sought to serve a warrant on party secretary James DeGraffenreid; both men had signed a fraudulent certificate of ascertainment. FBI agents interviewed Sam DeMarco, chair of the Allegheny County, Pennsylvania Republican party, at his home the next day. Politico reported concurrently that Arizona Republican chair Kelli Ward and her husband had also been subpoenaed, but did not specify when. (Note: Multiple sources:)

In January 2022, the Pennsylvania Attorney General’s office said that the conditional statement on the documents caused them not to meet the standards of forgery. However, the New Mexico Attorney General referred the matter to federal prosecutors, even though their documents had a similar conditional statement.

On June 22, 2022, the Justice Department issued subpoenas to Georgia Republican Party chair David Shafer and another party official who allegedly signed a document claiming to be Trump electors, and to a Virginia man who worked on the Trump campaign's efforts in Arizona and New Mexico. Other alleged false Trump electors in Michigan also received subpoenas, though it was not clear whether they were federal or state; Michigan attorney general Dana Nessel had also been investigating the fraudulent elector scheme.

By July 2022, Fulton County, Georgia district attorney Fani Willis had notified sixteen Republicans that they were "targets" of her criminal investigation.

During its fourth public hearing, the January 6 committee presented a video excerpt of a deposition from Republican National Committee chair Ronna McDaniel. She stated that Trump was fully aware of the fake electors plan, as he and Eastman had called her to enlist the committee's assistance to "gather these contingent electors, in case any of the legal challenges that were ongoing changed the result of any of the states."

The committee also heard testimony from Greg Jacob, counsel for Mike Pence, "that Mr. Eastman admitted in the Jan. 4 Oval Office meeting—with Mr. Trump present—that his plan to have Mr. Pence obstruct the electoral certification violated the Electoral Count Act."

The Washington Post reported on July 26, 2022, that the Justice Department was examining Trump's role. Prosecutors had asked grand jury witnesses hours of detailed questions about conversations between Trump, his attorneys and others about the scheme. Pence's former chief of staff Marc Short and counsel Greg Jacob, who had advised Pence to reject Eastman's Pence Card scheme, had testified before the grand jury. The Smith special counsel investigation, established in November 2022, examined the fake electors scheme, and in 2023 at least two fake electors testified before the grand jury in exchange for limited immunity.

The Arizona Attorney General sent a cease and desist letter to the group representing the fake electors on the illegal use of the state seal. By May 2023, Arizona Attorney General Kris Mayes was ramping up a criminal investigation into the signing and transmission of false certificates of ascertainment. By this time, at least eight of the sixteen Republicans who allegedly participated in the Georgia scheme had accepted immunity deals to cooperate with Fani Willis in her investigation. In March 2024 Mayes issued subpoenas to several of the fraudulent electors and unidentified members of the Trump campaign requiring them to appear before a grand jury. Mayes also indicated that the investigation was nearing conclusion.

CNN reported in June 2023 that Roman had entered into a proffer agreement with the Smith special counsel investigation.

By August 2023, local authorities in Pennsylvania and New Mexico were investigating electors.

In 2024, the state Republican parties of Arizona, Georgia, Pennsylvania, Michigan, Nevada, New Mexico and Wisconsin planned to send some of the fake electors to represent their parties at the Republican National Convention in Milwaukee.

== Prosecutions ==
Michigan Attorney General Dana Nessel announced on July 18, 2023, that she had charged sixteen individuals with eight felony counts each, including forgery and conspiracy, alleging they had knowingly signed certificates of ascertainment falsely claiming they were "duly elected and qualified electors" for Michigan. One defendant entered into a cooperation agreement with prosecutors in October 2023 in exchange for charges against him being dropped. Nessel's office disclosed during an April 2024 court hearing that Trump, Meadows, Giuliani and Ellis were unindicted co-conspirators.

On August 1, 2023, at the request of Jack Smith and the Justice Department, a federal grand jury indicted Trump on charges of conspiracy to defraud the United States, conspiracy against rights, obstructing an official proceeding and conspiracy to obstruct an official proceeding. The indictment accused Trump of orchestrating a criminal conspiracy to subvert the 2020 election, and identified the fake electors scheme as part of the conspiracy. The case was later dismissed after Trump won the 2024 United States presidential election due to the Justice Department's policy of not prosecuting sitting presidents.

On August 15, 2023, Trump and eighteen others were indicted in Georgia. The defendants, who included Trump, Giuliani, Eastman, Meadows, Chesebro, Sidney Powell, David Shafer and Shawn Still among others, were charged with a variety of offenses, many of which related to involvement in the fake electors plot. On October 20, Chesebro pleaded guilty to conspiring to file a false document and was sentenced to five years of probation; he also agreed to testify against the other defendants. Three other defendants (including Powell) also pleaded guilty to charges.

On December 6, 2023, a Clark County, Nevada, grand jury indicted six Republican party officials, including the chair of the Nevada Republican Party, on two felony charges each of submitting fraudulent documents to state and local officials.

By December 2023, 24 fake electors had been criminally charged in three states, and Chesebro was "a witness in all of the cases". However, in January 2024, the Attorney General of New Mexico stated that the fake electors couldn't be prosecuted given the laws of that state.

An Arizona grand jury named eleven alleged fake electors in an April 2024 indictment. Among those named were former Arizona Republican Party chair Kelli Ward and Tyler Bowyer, chief operating officer of Turning Point USA. Names of seven others charged were redacted from the indictment, and Trump was listed as "Unindicted Coconspirator 1". The Washington Post reported the redacted individuals were Mark Meadows, Rudy Giuliani, Jenna Ellis, John Eastman, Christina Bobb, Boris Epshteyn and Mike Roman. The Post reported that names of those indicted who were not in Arizona were redacted until they could be served with their indictments. Former State Legislator Kelly Townsend was identified by several media outlets as "Unindicted Coconspirator 2." According to the indictment, Townsend "spread false claims of election fraud following the 2020 election" and "helped organize and distribute a false document on December 14, 2020," titled, "Joint Resolution of the 54th Legislature." Townsend played a central role in spreading false claims that ballots had been brought in from Asia on a South Korean plane, along with other conspiracies such as the unfounded claim that Sharpies were used to alter results. Later during a Senate hearing in which many of her militia followers were present, encouraged what she described as happy to have "vigilantes" ready to monitor voting drop boxes in the then upcoming 2022 election. In early December 2020, Townsend urged fellow lawmakers to overturn the 2020 results and demanded Attorney General Mark Brnovich investigate the claims she and her allies presented at the Hyatt Hotel hearing with Attorneys Rudy Guiliani and Jenna Ellis, and on Dec. 7, 2020, she sent an email to fellow lawmakers asking them to sign a document stating that "not enough was done to ensure the public of a clean and fair election, and that every vote counted." Townsend's pressure of her fellow lawmakers resulted in a joint resolution, signed by 31 Republicans, urging congressional members to accept the "alternate 11 electors" or to have all electoral results voided pending "a full forensic audit." Several lawmakers later expressed regret for having relied on Townsend's urging and pressure to sign onto the resolution After presentation with the indictment, Townsend stated, "it's best that I don't make any comments." Shortly thereafter, Townsend moved to Maryland where she is now practicing as a doula.

On November 9, 2025, DOJ Pardon Attorney Ed Martin announced that Trump had pardoned 77 people associated with the fake electors scheme, including his 18 co-defendants in the Georgia case (but not himself). As no one on the list was facing federal charges, the pardon was largely symbolic.
