= Eric Herschmann =

American political advisor and attorney

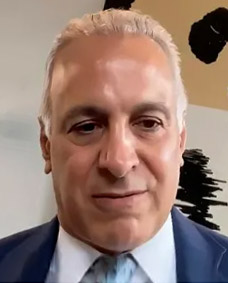
- Herschmann in 2022

Senior Advisor to the President
- In office August 3, 2020 – January 20, 2021
- President: Donald Trump
- Preceded by: Kevin Hassett; Jared Kushner; Stephen Miller
- Succeeded by: Mike Donilon; Anita Dunn; Cedric Richmond

Personal details
- Born: May 7, 1962 (age 64) New York City, U.S.
- Party: Republican
- Spouse(s): Debora Weisblum (divorced) Orly Genger (m. 2016)
- Children: 3
- Education: University of Miami (BA); Yeshiva University (JD)

Eric Herschmann (born May 7, 1962) is an American political advisor and attorney who served as a senior advisor to President Donald Trump during his first term.

== Legal career ==
Herschmann served as a partner at Kasowitz Benson Torres from 1996 until 2020 when he left the firm to accept an appointment in the White House.

During his time at the firm, he was associated with Southern Union Company, serving as counsel and in various executive positions for the company from 1997 until 2012. He also represented Citibank's corporate audit department. Previous to his work at Kasowitz Benson Torres, Herschmann was an Assistant District Attorney in the Manhattan's DA's Office.

In June 2025, Herschmann, Dan Benson, and Michael Bowen, all former partners at Kasowitz Benson Torres, formed their own firm.

== Advisor to Donald Trump ==
Herschmann met Trump through his friend, Jared Kushner. He served as one of President Trump's attorneys during his first impeachment trial in 2019 and 2020, giving several presentations in the U.S. Senate chamber.

In August 2020, he left his firm to join the White House with the title Senior Advisor to the President, with a portfolio described as "hazy" by The New York Times. While at the White House, Herschmann was involved in the Hunter Biden laptop controversy, providing a reporter from The Wall Street Journal with emails allegedly from Hunter Biden's laptop.

Towards the end of Trump's term, Herschmann was involved in high-level meetings about possible investigations into voter fraud in the 2020 elections. After his White House tenure ended, Axios reported on one such meeting Herschmann attended in the Oval Office. "Do you even know who the fuck I am, you idiot," he is reported to have asked former Overstock.com CEO Patrick M. Byrne, who was in the meeting suggesting election conspiracy theories to the president, only to have Byrne mis-identify Herschmann as White House Counsel Pat Cipollone. According to the account, Byrne suggested using "guys with big guns and badges" to seize voting machines and Herschmann responded, "What are you, three years old?" With respect to Trump election lawyer Sidney Powell's self-described "release the Kraken" strategy to overturn the election, Herschmann reportedly asked her rhetorically, "Are you out of your fucking mind?"

== Testimony to January 6 committee ==
Despite having a low profile during his time as a White House advisor, Herschmann gained greater notoriety from the June 23, 2022, fifth, January 6 committee public hearing which featured a video replay of his June 13, 2022, testimony.

Herschmann described events leading up to the January 6 attack on the Capitol to the committee in testimony with blunt and colorful terms.

"What they were proposing, I thought, was nuts," Herschmann said of the claims of voter fraud pushed by some of Trump's attorneys. "Are you out of your effing mind? You're completely crazy," Herschmann claims he said to Trump attorney John Eastman about the so-called Eastman memos.

"Get a great f'ing criminal defense lawyer. You're going to need it," Herschmann testified he told Eastman on the phone of Eastman's plan to overturn the 2020 election results, "and then I hung up on him." Eastman was later charged with multiple felonies for his conduct.

Herschmann testified that he told Assistant Attorney General Jeffrey Clark "good, effing A-hole, congratulations. You just admitted your first step or act you take as attorney general would be committing a felony," after learning of his plan to be installed as acting Attorney General and send out a letter to state officials with false accusations of voter fraud. Clark was later charged with multiple felonies in Georgia over this letter.

Political reporters commented on the three works of art, on the wall behind Herschmann, during his virtual testimony before the congressional committee, including a baseball bat with the word "justice" printed on it, by Sebastian ErraZuriz, three chrome-colored sculptures by Tal Frank, and a painting by Rob Pruitt, that resembled an artwork featured in the erotic film Fifty Shades of Grey.

After the testimony of Cassidy Hutchinson before the January 6 Committee, a spokesman for Herschmann confirmed "that a handwritten note regarding a potential statement for then-President Donald Trump to release during the Jan. 6 attack on the Capitol was written by him during a meeting at the White House that afternoon, and not by White House aide Cassidy Hutchinson."

== Trump documents investigation ==
On September 19, 2022, The New York Times reported that in late 2021, Herschmann had attempted to warn President Trump of his legal exposure for possible mishandling of classified documents. Trump would later be arrested for the issue.
