= Jeffrey Clark letter =

2020 political document

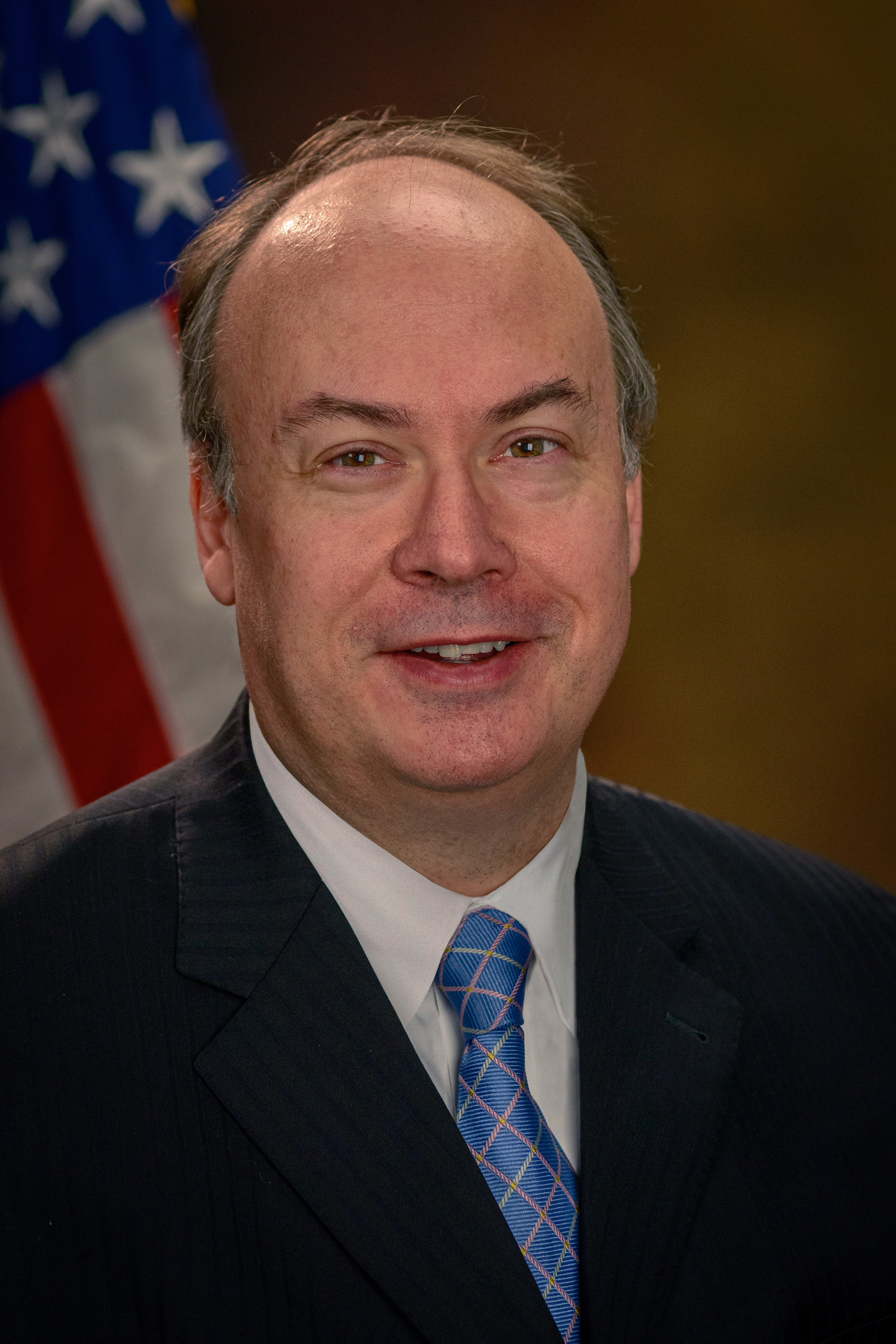
Jeffrey Bossert Clark in 2018

The Jeffrey Clark letter was a draft letter that falsely claimed the United States Department of Justice had been investigating "various irregularities in the 2020 election."

Joe Biden won the election on November 3, 2020. On December 28, Jeffrey Clark proposed to acting attorney general Jeffrey Rosen and his deputy Richard Donoghue that the letter be sent to Georgia lawmakers, with modified versions to be prepared for "contested states": Arizona, Michigan, Nevada, New Mexico, Pennsylvania, and Wisconsin. It called on these states to hold special legislative sessions; their goal was to secure alternate slates of electors who would cast votes for Donald Trump to overturn Biden's victory. Rosen and Donoghue rejected the proposal and no such letter was sent.

The letter originated with Ken Klukowski, a senior legal analyst for far-right Breitbart News. Klukowski had co-authored the 2010 book The Blueprint: Obama's Plan to Subvert the Constitution and Build an Imperial Presidency. Klukowski emailed the letter to Clark, and 20 minutes later, Clark emailed it to Rosen and Donoghue.

== See also ==
- United States Justice Department investigation into attempts to overturn the 2020 presidential election
- Eastman memos
- Ginni Thomas' efforts to overturn the 2020 presidential election
- Republican efforts to restrict voting following the 2020 presidential election
- Republican reactions to Donald Trump's claims of 2020 election fraud
- Sedition Caucus
- Trump–Raffensperger phone call
- Public hearings of the United States House Select Committee on the January 6 Attack
