= Brian Boynton =

American lawyer (born 1967)

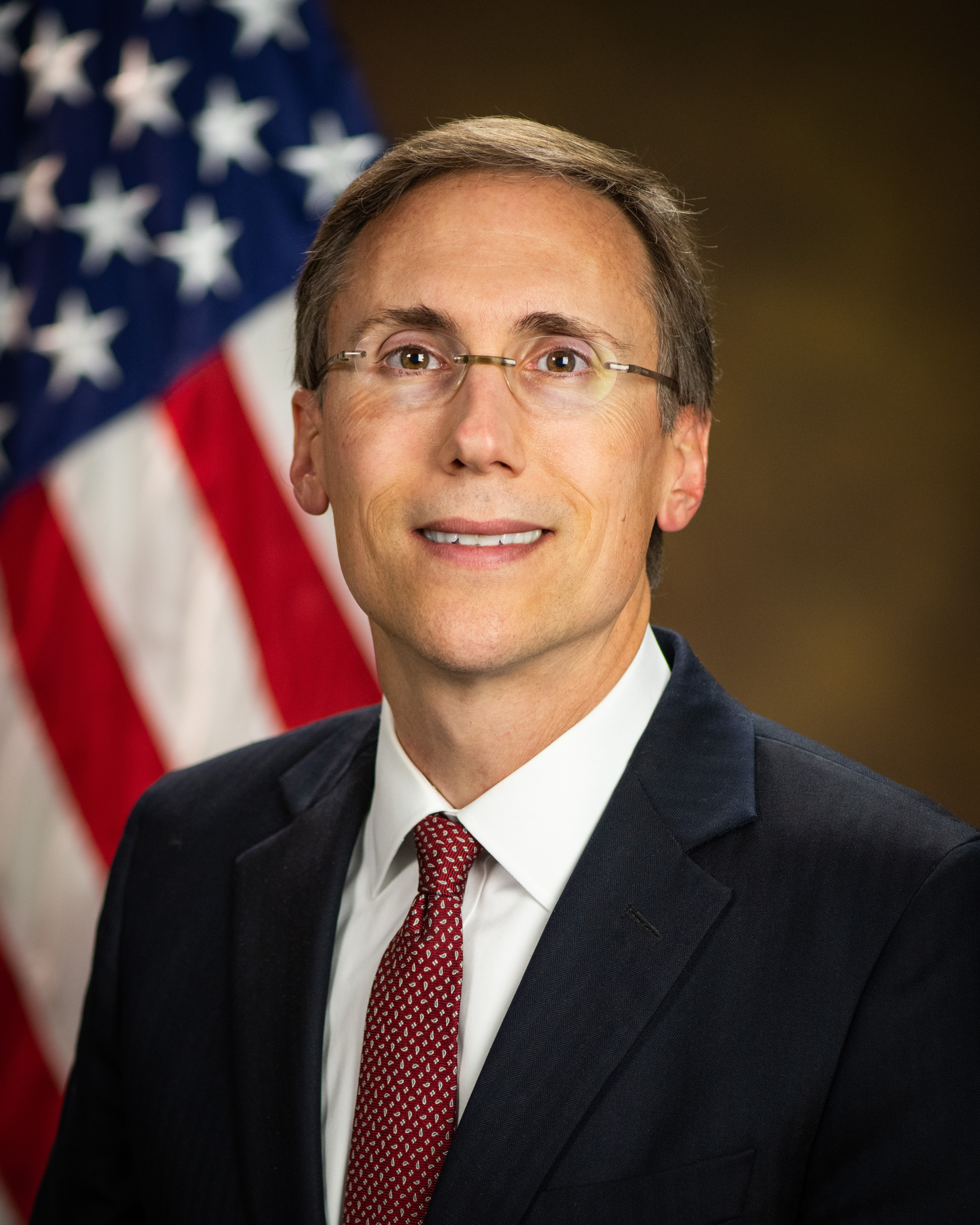

United States Assistant Attorney General for the Civil Division
- Acting
- In office January 20, 2021 – January 20, 2025
- President: Joe Biden
- Preceded by: Jeffrey Clark (acting)
- Succeeded by: Yaakov M. Roth (acting)

Personal details
- Education: Dartmouth College (BA); Stanford University (JD)

Brian Matthew Boynton is an American lawyer who served as the Acting Assistant Attorney General and Principal Deputy Assistant Attorney General for the Civil Division since 2021.

== Early life and education ==
Boynton attended Cupertino High School and graduated in 1993. He went on to enroll at Dartmouth College, where he graduated summa cum laude in 1997 with a degree in economics. He attended Stanford Law School, where he was a notes editor of the Stanford Law Review. He graduated Order of the Coif in 2000 with a Juris Doctor degree.

== Career ==
Boynton served as a law clerk for Judge Douglas H. Ginsburg of the United States Court of Appeals for the District of Columbia Circuit and Judge Vaughn Walker of the United States District Court for the Northern District of California. From 2002 to 2014, he practiced law at the law firm WilmerHale in Washington, D.C. He worked in the Department of Justice from 2014 to 2017, serving as Deputy Assistant Attorney General in the Office of Legal Counsel and then as a Counselor to Attorney General Loretta Lynch. He rejoined WilmerHale as a partner in April 2017. In January 2021, he joined the Biden administration, serving as Acting Assistant Attorney General and Principal Deputy Assistant Attorney General for the Civil Division in the Department of Justice.

Legal offices
Preceded by Jeffrey Clark; Acting	United States Assistant Attorney General for the Civil Division; Acting; 2021–2025	Succeeded by Yaakov M. Roth; Acting
