= Eastman memos =

Memos outlining debunked legal theories to overturn the 2020 US presidential election

Attempts to overturn the 2020 United States presidential election
- The electoral map for the 2020 election. Biden won 306 electoral votes to Trump's 232.
- Date: November 4, 2020 – January 7, 2021 (2 months and 3 days)
- Location: Arizona, Georgia, Michigan, Nevada, Pennsylvania, Wisconsin and Washington, D.C.
- Caused by: Fabricated claims of electoral fraud
- Result: Failure to overturn election; Joe Biden inaugurated January 20, 2021

The Eastman memos, also known as the "coup memo", are documents by John Eastman, an American law professor retained by then-President Donald Trump, advancing the fringe legal theory that the presiding officer of the United States Senate, either the president of the Senate or the president pro tempore, has the unilateral authority to count, deliberate over, and reject certified state electors and electoral votes. This theoretical power could be used to nullify an election in order to produce an outcome personally desired by the senate president, potentially including: a result in his own party's favor; retaining himself as vice president; if the senate president is himself a presidential candidate, to unilaterally make himself president-elect.

Trump and Eastman adhered to the memos in an unsuccessful campaign to pressure then-vice president Mike Pence into obstructing the 2021 United States Electoral College vote count and overturning the 2020 United States election of Joe Biden, in an attempt to have Trump retain power. The Trump campaign engaged Eastman with a formal retainer agreement signed December 5 for services in litigating the election outcome. The memos have been described as an instruction manual for a coup d'état.

== Overview ==
Journalist Barton Gellman, writing for The Atlantic, stated in September 2020 that "sources in the Republican Party" were claiming that the Trump campaign was planning on requesting state legislatures to "exercise their power to choose a slate of electors directly" in the case that Trump lost the upcoming 2020 United States presidential election. This idea, which was based upon the independent state legislature theory, was mentioned by former Energy Secretary Rick Perry in a text message to White House Chief of Staff Mark Meadows after election day. Republican activist Cleta Mitchell sent Eastman an email on November 5, asking him to write a legal memo explaining the theory. During a meeting with his advisors on November 11, President Trump was interested in the idea of state legislatures appointing Republican electors. Beginning in November, a lawyer named Kenneth Chesebro wrote a series of legal memorandum for the Trump campaign developing what would later be referred to as the fake electors plot. The memos outlined a plan where the Trump campaign would submit documents in several states which claimed to be legitimate electoral certificates for President Trump and Vice President Mike Pence. After the submission of these documents, it was intended that the presiding officer of the United States Senate, either President of the Senate Pence or President pro tempore Chuck Grassley, would claim to have the unilateral power to reject electors during the January 6, 2021 vote counting session; the presiding officer would reject all electors from the several states in which the Trump campaign had submitted false documents, thereby overturning the election results in favour of Trump. Although he initially disputed the constitutionality of the senate president's alleged unilateral power, Eastman would later use Chesebro's proposals as the basis for his own memos.

In that context, Eastman tried to convince Pence that he could overturn the election results on January 6, 2021 (when Congress counted the Electoral College votes) by throwing out electors from "7 states" – presumably Arizona, Georgia, Michigan, Nevada, Pennsylvania, and Wisconsin, along with either New Mexico or the federal district Washington, D.C. Slates of electors declaring Trump the winner were submitted from the seven states, but the National Archives did not accept the unsanctioned documents and they did not explicitly enter the deliberations. Under Eastman's scheme, Pence would have declared Trump the winner with more Electoral College votes after the seven states were thrown out, at 232 votes to 222.

According to a news report in The Washington Post on October 23, 2021, the Willard Hotel was a "command center" for the White House plot, that included Eastman, to overturn the results of the 2020 election. According to The Guardian, Eastman was part of a legal team at the Willard that Trump called the night before the January 6 attack on the Capitol and asked them to find ways to stop Biden's certification the next day. Further related details of the effort to deny and overturn the election have been reported, including a meeting between election deniers and Trump administration official Robert Destro at the State Department on January 6. Also in October 2021, Richard Painter said that the former president could be blocked from running again in 2024, due to his activities associated with the January 6, 2021 attack on the Capitol. The memos are undated. The first memo was prepared in late 2020 following a December 24, 2020 request by a Trump aide. The second and longer memo was likely prepared in early 2021 as it cites a December 31, 2020 court filing.

== First memorandum ==
The first memo described the constitutional and statutory process for opening and counting of electoral votes under the Twelfth Amendment and Electoral Count Act, alleging that the Electoral Count Act was unconstitutional. The memo further claimed that the Vice President, who also serves as President of the Senate and presides over the joint session of Congress, "does the counting, including the resolution of disputed electoral votes... and all the Members of Congress can do is watch." The memo refers to the actions of John Adams and Thomas Jefferson during the presidential elections of 1796 and 1800 as evidence for this claim; some supporters of President Trump, such as Congressman Louie Gohmert, had falsely claimed that Jefferson's counting of Georgia's electoral votes in 1800 indicated that the Vice President could unilaterally accept or reject electoral votes. The memo then laid out a six-step plan for Pence to overturn Biden's election:

# VP Pence, presiding over the joint session (or Senate Pro Tempore Grassley, if Pence recuses himself), begins to open and count the ballots, starting with Alabama (without conceding that the procedure, specified by the Electoral Count Act, of going through the States alphabetically is required).
1. When he gets to Arizona, he announces that he has multiple slates of electors, and so is going to defer decision on that until finishing the other States. This would be the first break with the procedure set out in the Act.
2. At the end, he announces that because of the ongoing disputes in the 7 States, there are no electors that can be deemed validly appointed in those States. That means the total number of "electors appointed" – the language of the 12th Amendment – is 454. This reading of the 12th Amendment has also been advanced by Harvard Law Professor Laurence Tribe. A "majority of the electors appointed" would therefore be 228. There are at this point 232 votes for Trump, 222 votes for Biden. Pence then gavels President Trump as re-elected.
3. Howls, of course, from the Democrats, who now claim, contrary to Tribe's prior position, that 270 is required. So Pence says, fine. Pursuant to the 12th Amendment, no candidate has achieved the necessary majority. That sends the matter to the House, where “the votes shall be taken by states, the representation from each state having one vote ..." Republicans currently control 26 of the state delegations, the bare majority needed to win that vote. President Trump is re-elected there as well.
4. One last piece. Assuming the Electoral Count Act process is followed and, upon getting the objections to the Arizona slates, the two houses break into their separate chambers, we should not allow the Electoral Count Act constraint on debate to control. That would mean that a prior legislature was determining the rules of the present one – a constitutional no-no (as Tribe has forcefully argued). So someone – Ted Cruz, Rand Paul, etc. – should demand normal rules (which includes the filibuster). That creates a stalemate that would give the state legislatures more time to weigh in to formally support the alternate slate of electors, if they had not already done so.
5. The main thing here is that Pence should do this without asking for permission – either from a vote of the joint session or from the Court. Let the other side challenge his actions in court, where Tribe (who in 2001 conceded the President of the Senate might be in charge of counting the votes) and others who would press a lawsuit would have their past position – that these are non-justiciable political questions – thrown back at them, to get the lawsuit dismissed. The fact is that the Constitution assigns this power to the Vice President as the ultimate arbiter. We should take all of our actions with that in mind.

== Second memorandum ==
The second memo laid out a more extensive plan with multiple scenarios for Pence to take to overturn Biden's election. The first section outlined alleged illegal conduct by election officials in six states (Arizona, Georgia, Michigan, Nevada, Pennsylvania, Wisconsin). The second section again alleged that the Electoral Count Act was unconstitutional, and that Pence had the power to unilaterally accept or reject electoral votes. The third section referred to "7 states" and outlined various alternatives for Pence to take to overturn Biden's election:

- VP Pence opens the ballots, determines on his own which is valid, asserting that the authority to make that determination under the 12th Amendment, and the Adams and Jefferson precedents, is his alone (anything in the Electoral Count Act to the contrary is therefore unconstitutional).
  - If State Legislatures have certified the Trump electors, he counts those, as required by Article II (the provision of the Electoral Count Act giving the default victory to the “executive”-certified slate therefore being unconstitutional). Any combination of states totaling 38 elector votes, and TRUMP WINS.
  - If State Legislatures have not certified their own slates of electors, VP Pence determines, based on all the evidence and the letters from state legislators calling into question the executive certifications, decides to count neither slate of electors. (Note: this could be done with he gets to Arizona in the alphabetical roster, or he could defer Arizona and the other multi-slate states until the end, and then make the determination). At the end of the count, the tally would therefore be 232 for Trump, 222 for Biden. Because the 12th Amendment says "majority of electors appointed," having determined that no electors from the 7 states were appointed (a position in accord with that taken by Harvard Law Professor Laurence Tribe (here)), TRUMP WINS.
  - Alternatively, VP Pence determines that because multiple electors were appointed from the 7 states but not counted because of ongoing election disputes, neither candidate has the necessary 270 elector votes, throwing the election to the House. IF the Republicans in the State Delegations stand firm, the vote there is 26 states for Trump, 23 for Biden, and 1 split vote. TRUMP WINS.
- VP Pence determines that the ongoing election challenges must conclude before ballots can be counted, and adjourns the joint session of Congress, determining that the time restrictions in the Electoral County Act are contrary to his authority under the 12th Amendment and therefore void. Taking the cue, state legislatures convene, order a comprehensive audit/investigation of the election returns in their states, and then determine whether the slate of electors initially certified is valid, or whether the alternative slate of electors should be certified by the legislature, exercise authority it has directly from Article II and also from 3 U.S.C. § 2, which provides: "Whenever any State has held an election for the purpose of choosing electors, and has failed to make a choice on the day prescribed by law, the electors may be appointed on a subsequent day in such a manner as the legislature of such State may direct."
  - If ... the investigation proves to the satisfaction of the legislature that there was sufficient fraud and illegality to affect the results of the election, the Legislature certifies the Trump electors. Upon reconvening the Joint Session of Congress, those votes are counted and TRUMP WINS.

== Rejection by Vice President Pence ==
Gregory Jacob, chief legal counsel to then-Vice President Pence, wrote a memo on December 8, 2020, to the vice-president regarding the January 6 Process for Elector Vote Count, outlining the constitutional issues at stake in the Twelfth Amendment and the Electoral Count Act of 1887. The Jacob memo provided a basis for Vice President Mike Pence's deferral on January 6 to the U.S. Constitution and to the States, in opposition to the direct request from a sitting president.

Jacob's memo accepted a key legal claim made by Eastman, that there was a precedent set by Jefferson (and possibly Adams) for a vice president to choose which electoral college votes to count. The claim originated in a series of articles by Bruce Ackerman that then-Vice President Thomas Jefferson had in 1800 counted electoral college votes that he should not have done. By implication, this raised the notion that choosing which votes to count was an inherent right of the vice president under the Constitution. Ackerman first put this theory forward, with David Fontana, in 2004. He repeated it in 2020 in an op-ed for the Los Angeles Times that was widely shared that fall.

On December 31, 2020, Ackerman's claim was debunked in an article published on the Backbencher, then republished in the Washington Monthly on January 5, 2021. Another published article further debunked Eastman and Ackerman's claim that Vice Presidents had the right to choose which electoral college votes to count. On January 5, 2021, J. Michael Luttig tweeted a response to Holly Brewer, the article writer and legal historian at the University of Maryland. Luttig reaffirmed Brewer's historical scholarship and attributed its influence to the January 5, 2021 political and constitutional history. The Trump administration's Attorney General William Barr rejected the legal theory presented in the Eastman memos, submitting his resignation on December 14. In an interview, Barr stated that Eastman's claim that Pence could change things was "crazy," but that "there's nothing inherently wrong with naming an alternative slate of electors".

== Further legal analysis ==
On September 27, 2021, Laurence Tribe, American legal scholar and University Professor Emeritus of constitutional law at Harvard University, and colleagues, fully described the legal background of the attempt to overturn the 2020 election, as well as possible ways of averting the use of such a legal strategy or similar approach in the future. The Eastman memos have been described as an instruction manual for a coup d'état.

== Disciplinary action ==
In October 2021, serious complaints that could lead to disbarment were officially submitted against Eastman and related attorney Jeffrey Clark regarding their conduct in attempting to overturn the 2020 election. In March 2022, the State Bar of California confirmed that it had been investigating Eastman since September 2021. Also in March 2022, Reuters reported that two U.S. Justice Department officials, Jeffrey A. Rosen and Richard Donoghue, had cooperated with the D.C. Bar's Office of Disciplinary Counsel in its investigation of Jeffrey Clark's possible misconduct in his alleged efforts to help Trump overturn the results of the 2020 election. Eastman's District of Columbia law license was suspended in May 2024. In April 2026, Eastman was disbarred by the Supreme Court of California.

== Electoral Count Reform of 2022 ==
In December 2022 president Biden signed into law the Electoral Count Reform and Presidential Transition Improvement Act of 2022, which explicitly clarified that the President of the Senate's role in the counting of the electoral votes is "solely ministerial," with no power to "determine, accept, reject, or otherwise adjudicate or resolve disputes over the proper list of electors, the validity of electors, or the votes of electors". Also, the bill states that any objection made by a senator or representative during the counting of the electoral votes must be made in writing and signed by at least one-fifth of the Senators and one-fifth of the Members of the House of Representatives. Previously, an objection required the signatures of only one member of each chamber.

== See also ==
- Business Plot – 1933 plan to overthrow the U.S. government
- Ginni Thomas's efforts to overturn the 2020 presidential election
- Jeffrey Clark letter
- Newburgh Conspiracy – an attempt to overthrow the Continental Congress
- Public hearings of the United States House Select Committee on the January 6 Attack
- Wilmington massacre – 1898 insurrection and massacre in North Carolina, US
