= Jeffrey Clark =

American lawyer (born 1967)

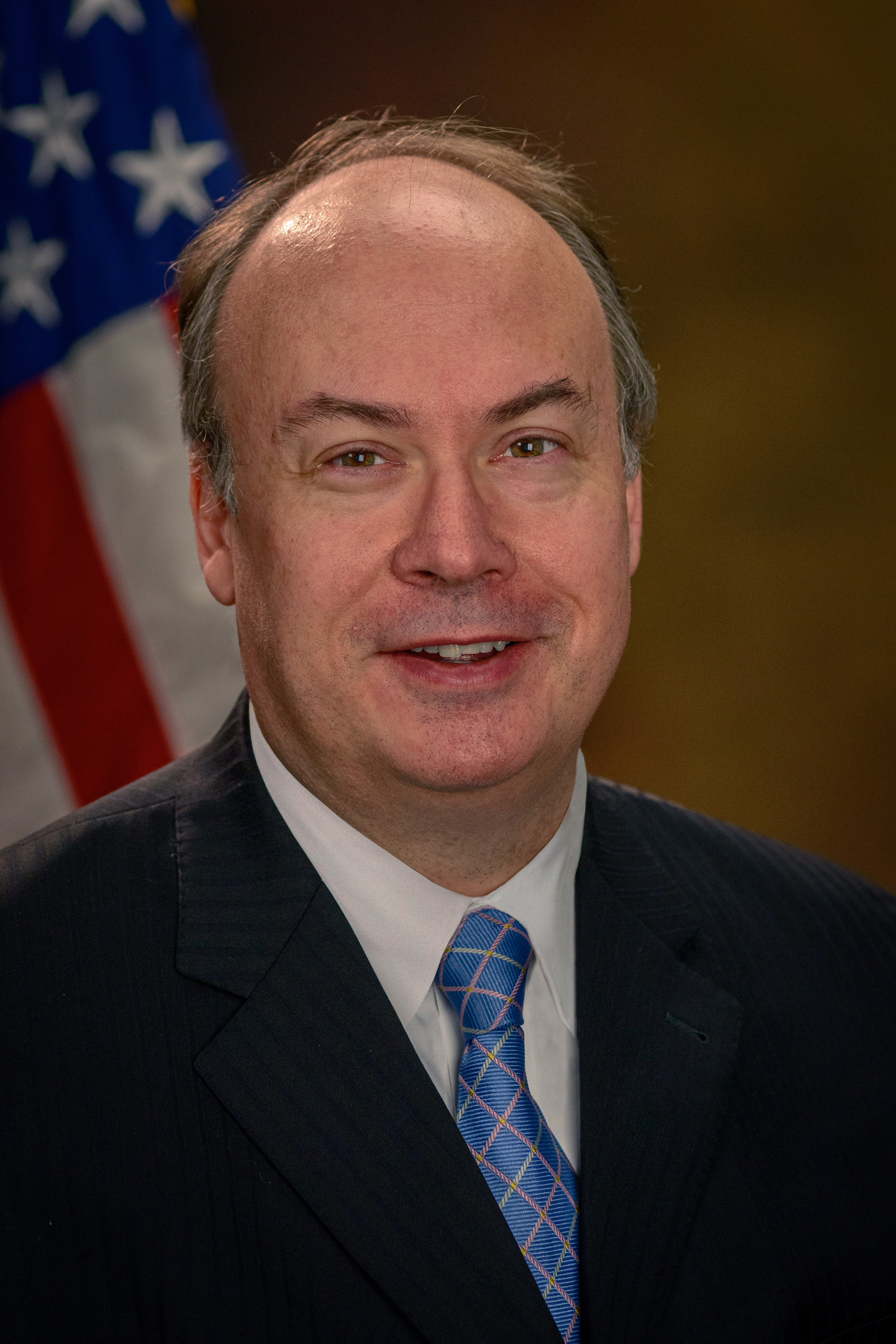

Administrator of the Office of Information and Regulatory Affairs
- Acting
- In office March 5, 2025 – March 4, 2026
- President: Donald Trump
- Preceded by: Dominic Mancini (acting)
- Succeeded by: Mark Paoletta (acting)

United States Assistant Attorney General for the Civil Division
- Acting; September 5, 2020 – January 14, 2021
- President: Donald Trump
- Preceded by: Ethan Davis (acting)
- Succeeded by: Brian Boynton (acting)

United States Assistant Attorney General for the Environment and Natural Resources Division
- In office November 1, 2018 – January 14, 2021
- President: Donald Trump
- Preceded by: John Cruden
- Succeeded by: Todd Kim

Personal details
- Born: Jeffrey Bossert Clark; April 17, 1967 (age 59) Philadelphia, Pennsylvania, U.S.
- Party: Republican
- Education: Harvard University (BA); University of Delaware (MA); Georgetown University (JD)

Jeffrey Bossert Clark (born April 17, 1967) is an American lawyer who served as the acting administrator of the Office of Information and Regulatory Affairs at the Office of Management and Budget from March 2025 to March 2026. Clark served as the assistant attorney general for the Environment and Natural Resources Division from 2018 to 2021 and as the acting assistant attorney general for the Civil Division from 2020 to 2021. In 2020 and 2021, Clark allegedly helped then-president Donald Trump attempt to overturn the 2020 presidential election. Clark's actions in that endeavor were reviewed by the District of Columbia Bar – the entity authorized by law to pursue attorney discipline and disbarment in the District of Columbia – which recommended discipline to the DC Court of Appeals in July 2022, and in August 2024 its Board on Professional Responsibility recommended a two year suspension of his law license. In July 2025, the board recommended to the appeals court that Clark be disbarred. He was identified as an unindicted co-conspirator in the federal prosecution of Donald Trump over attempts to overturn the 2020 election. On August 14, 2023, he was indicted along with 18 other people in the prosecution related to the 2020 election in Georgia.

After Joe Biden won the 2020 presidential election and Trump refused to concede while making false claims of fraud, Clark worked on ways to cast doubt on the election results. Trump considered installing Clark as head of the Department of Justice when acting Attorney General Jeffrey Rosen refused to lend credence to Trump's false claims of fraud, but backed off when faced with the prospect of mass resignations within the Department of Justice if he made the change. Clark resigned from the Department of Justice on January 14, 2021, after controversy over his post-election actions.

After the end of the Trump administration, Clark was briefly named the Chief of Litigation and Director of Strategy at the conservative-libertarian New Civil Liberties Alliance. On December 1, 2021, the House committee on the January 6 attack voted to recommend contempt of Congress charges against Clark after he refused to comply with a subpoena.

In between Trump administrations, Clark was working as a Senior Fellow and Director of Litigation at the Center for Renewing America, a conservative think tank founded by his friend Russell Vought, former director of the Office of Management and Budget.

In 2026, Clark joined the Oversight Project.

== Early life and career ==
Clark was born on April 17, 1967, in Philadelphia, Pennsylvania. He graduated from Father Judge High School in the Holmesburg section of Northeast Philadelphia. He was on the parliamentary debate team at Harvard College, where he graduated with a Bachelor of Arts in economics and history in 1989. He received a Master of Arts in urban affairs and public policy from the University of Delaware in 1993, and a Juris Doctor from the Georgetown University Law Center in 1995.

After graduating from law school, Clark clerked for Judge Danny J. Boggs of the United States Court of Appeals for the Sixth Circuit (Cincinnati, Ohio).

Clark joined Kirkland & Ellis as a lawyer during 1996–2001 and 2005–2018. During 2001–2005, he served in the George W. Bush administration as Deputy Assistant Attorney General for the Environment and Natural Resources Division of the Justice Department. At Kirkland & Ellis, Clark represented the United States Chamber of Commerce in lawsuits challenging the federal government's authority to regulate carbon emissions and the Environmental Protection Agency's "endangerment finding," while also a part of the team representing BP in lawsuits related to the 2010 Deepwater Horizon oil spill.

From 2012 to 2015, he was a member of the governing council of the American Bar Association's Administrative Law Section. He is also a member of the Federalist Society.

== Assistant Attorney General ==
In June 2017, Clark was nominated by President Donald Trump to become the United States Assistant Attorney General for the Environment and Natural Resources Division. He was confirmed by the Senate on October 11, 2018. Within the division, Clark "developed a reputation for pushing aggressive conservative legal principles and taking a hands-on approach that drew kudos from some colleagues but often frustrated career lawyers on his team."

Clark had opposed regulation of greenhouse gases. In 2010, he had characterized US efforts to regulate greenhouse gases as "reminiscent of kind of a Leninistic program from the 1920s to seize control of the commanding heights of the economy."

While Assistant Attorney General, Clark tried to delay the DOJ in seeking criminal and civil charges against North Dakota pipeline operator Summit Midstream Partners for its role in the largest-ever inland spill of waste water from oil drilling. Clark's attempts to delay the case led prosecutors under his supervision to go directly to Deputy Attorney General Jeffrey Rosen with the prosecutors arguing that Clark's rationale for delaying the case was inconsistent with "decades of case law". Ultimately, the DOJ proceeded with the case, which would become one of the largest water pollution cases in U.S. history. Summit Midstream Partners ultimately pleaded guilty and incurred $36.3 million in civil penalties.

=== Acting Assistant Attorney General for the Civil Division ===
In September 2020, he was also appointed acting head of the Justice Department's Civil Division with the support of Deputy Attorney General Jeffrey A. Rosen. Upon becoming the acting head of the civil division, Clark attempted unsuccessfully to include the government in lawsuits concerning defamation against Trump by E. Jean Carroll, who has accused Trump of raping her, and against a former friend of First Lady Melania Trump.

=== Attempts to overturn results of 2020 presidential election ===
In late December 2020 and early January 2021, Clark tried unsuccessfully to get the Justice Department to support Trump's attempts to overturn the results of the 2020 presidential election. After Joe Biden won the 2020 presidential election, Trump refused to concede and strove to overturn Biden's win, making false claims of election fraud. Clark became an ally of Trump in his attempt to overturn the election results. Clark was introduced to Trump by Republican congressman Scott Perry. In late December 2020 Clark urged acting Attorney General Jeffrey Rosen, his deputy Richard Donoghue, and other top Justice Department officials to have the Department announce it was investigating serious election fraud issues. They rejected the suggestion; Rosen and his predecessor William Barr had resisted pressure from Trump to interfere with or cast doubt on the election results.

On December 28, 2020, Clark emailed Rosen and Donoghue a draft letter which he reportedly had discussed with Perry, requesting they sign it. The letter had been emailed to Clark 20 minutes earlier by Ken Klukowski, senior counsel to Clark and a former legal analyst for Breitbart News; Klukowski had co-authored a 2010 book titled, The Blueprint: Obama’s Plan to Subvert the Constitution and Build an Imperial Presidency.

The draft letter was addressed to officials in the state of Georgia, saying that the Justice Department had evidence that raised "significant concerns" about the election results in multiple states, contradicting what Barr had publicly announced weeks earlier. The letter suggested the Georgia legislature should "call itself into special session for [t]he limited purpose of considering issues pertaining to the appointment of Presidential Electors". Both Rosen and Donoghue refused to sign the letter, and it was never sent.

In early January 2021, Clark challenged an intelligence briefing top Justice Department officials had received from Director of National Intelligence John Ratcliffe finding there was no evidence foreign powers had interfered with voting machines. He claimed intelligence community analysts were withholding information, saying he had heard that "a Dominion machine accessed the Internet through a smart thermostat with a net connection trail leading back to China."

==== Attempted appointment as Acting Attorney General ====
Also in January, Trump considered replacing Rosen with Clark, because he was disappointed that Rosen would not support his unsupported claims of fraud, while Clark had worked on ways to cast doubt on, or even overturn, the election results. Trump expected that if Clark became acting attorney general, he would reverse the decisions of previous attorneys general and publicly declare that DOJ had serious concerns about the election results. In particular he would open an investigation into supposed election fraud tainting the Georgia election, the results of which would compel Georgia officials to void Biden's win in that state. When Clark told Rosen that Trump intended to appoint him to replace Rosen, the Department's remaining senior leaders – including Donoghue and Assistant Attorney General for the Office of Legal Counsel Steven Engel – agreed they would all resign if Rosen was removed. After Rosen and Clark presented their arguments to Trump in a White House meeting, Trump decided not to pursue the option.

Clark denied that he had plotted to replace Rosen, who had mentored Clark when both worked at the law firm of Kirkland & Ellis, or that he recommended any action based on inaccurate material. He added that he could not discuss any conversations he had with Trump or with Justice Department lawyers because of legal privilege. Clark further noted that he had been the lead signatory on the Justice Department's letter opposing a claim that Vice President Mike Pence had the power to reject electoral votes for Biden when Congress met to certify the result.

Clark's alleged cooperation with Trump to remove Rosen and to use the Justice Department's power to alter Georgia's election results was met with surprise by many of Clark's friends, colleagues, and acquaintances, who had previously viewed him as an "establishment lawyer" rather than a part of the "Trumpist faction of the party."

On December 14, 2021, the House Select Committee on the January 6 Attack released the contents of a text message dated Sunday, January 3 from an unknown person to White House chief of staff Mark Meadows which read: "I heard Jeff Clark is getting put in on Monday. That's amazing. It will make a lot of patriots happy and I'm personally so proud that you are at the tip of the spear and I can call you a friend."

=== Resignation and investigation ===
Clark resigned from the Justice Department on January 14, 2021. On January 25, 2021, the Justice Department's Office of Inspector General, Michael E. Horowitz, launched "an investigation into whether any former or current DOJ official engaged in an improper attempt to have DOJ seek to alter the outcome of the 2020 Presidential Election." In early August, Rosen and Donoghue told the inspector general and members of the Senate Judiciary Committee that Clark helped Trump attempt to subvert the election.

In October 2021, an ethics complaint against Clark, regarding his conduct when attempting to overturn the 2020 election, was filed with the District of Columbia Court of Appeals.

On October 7, 2021, the Senate Judiciary Committee released new testimony and a staff report. They "reveal that we were only a half-step away from a full-blown constitutional crisis as President Donald Trump and his loyalists threatened a wholesale takeover of the Department of Justice (DOJ). They also reveal how former Acting Civil Division Assistant Attorney General Jeffrey Clark became Trump's Big Lie Lawyer, pressuring his colleagues in DOJ to force an overturn of the 2020 election."

On October 13, 2021, the U.S. House Select Committee to Investigate the January 6th Attack on the United States Capitol subpoenaed Clark for testimony and documents. On December 1, 2021, the committee voted to recommend criminal charges of contempt of Congress against Clark. On February 2, 2022, at an appearance before the committee, he refused to answer any substantive questions, asserting his right against self-incrimination in excess of 100 times.

On June 22, 2022, federal investigators searched Clark's home but did not immediately release details of which agency conducted the search or what they were looking for. According to Clark's boss at the Center for Renewing America, Russell Vought: "DOJ law enforcement officials ... put him in the streets in his pajamas, and took his electronic devices." The search came one day before the House Select Committee on the January 6 Attack held a televised hearing that addressed Clark's alleged role in attempts to overturn the 2020 United States presidential election.

Media Matters reported the next day that in May 2022 Clark promoted the disproven Dinesh D'Souza film 2000 Mules while taunting law professor Steve Vladeck and Democratic elections attorney Marc Elias on Twitter. He asked Elias, who had thwarted every lawsuit Trump's legal team had pursued after the election, "Were you part of the massive multi-State operation #TrueTheVote uncovered?"

On July 22, 2022, Clark was accused of violating ethics rules by the D.C. Bar Office of Disciplinary Counsel, which filed ethics charges against him for alleged interference in the administration of justice in relation to his alleged efforts to keep Trump in power. The disciplinary counsel's complaint noted that Clark was told numerous times by acting U.S. attorney general, Jeffrey A. Rosen and acting deputy U.S. attorney general, Richard P. Donoghue, that there was no evidence to support Clark's allegations of election fraud. Despite this, Clark directed Kenneth Klukowski, who joined the Justice Department after the 2020 presidential election, to conduct research on submitting unauthorized electors to Congress. This research, according to the complaint, was then allegedly used by Clark to draft a "proof-of concept" letter to election officials in Georgia, which included several false or misleading statements, including that the state's election results were fraudulent and that the state legislature needed to convene a special session. In April 2024, the Disciplinary Counsel recommended that Clark be disbarred. In July 2025, the District of Columbia Board of Professional Responsibility recommended that he be disbarred, and referred the matter to the U.S. Court of Appeals for the District of Columbia. The board said that attorneys "cannot advocate for any outcome based on false statements" or encourage others to take such actions, but Clark had "persistently and energetically sought to do just that on an important national issue". In May 2026, the second Trump administration sued the District of Columbia Bar.

In August 2023, Clark was indicted along with 18 other people in the Georgia election racketeering prosecution, related to Donald Trump's efforts to overturn the 2020 presidential election. Clark was allegedly warned by the Deputy White House Counsel that should Trump refuse to leave office there would be "...riots in every major city in the United States," according to the indictment. Though it did not identify him by name, it was determined he was unindicted "Co-conspirator 4," in the federal prosecution of Donald Trump over attempts to overturn the 2020 election. Clark was said to have responded, "That's why there's an Insurrection Act." In the aftermath of Trump v. United States, Clark was removed from the federal indictment by the Department of Justice.

== Later career ==
Clark's booking photograph released by the Fulton County, Georgia, sheriff's office

In August 2021, Clark was named the Chief of Litigation and Director of Strategy for the New Civil Liberties Alliance (NCLA), a 501(c)3 nonprofit which describes itself as a nonpartisan, nonprofit civil rights organization whose goal is "to protect constitutional freedoms from violations by the Administrative State." Since its founding in 2017, by 2023, the NCLA, a member of the State Policy Network, has received, from among others, $3.6 million from the Charles Koch Foundation. The organization's current focus is opposition to vaccine mandates and other COVID-19-related regulations and orders. In October, after Clark received a congressional subpoena regarding his participation in the January 6 attack on the Capitol, his name disappeared from the NCLA site, though it had been restored by the time of his indictment.

Clark later became the Senior Fellow and Director of Litigation at the Center for Renewing America, a conservative think tank that focuses on combatting critical race theory that was founded by Trump's OMB director and Clark's friend Russell Vought.

On August 14, 2023, Clark, along with 18 co-defendants, was indicted by a grand jury in Fulton County, Georgia, for violations of the Georgia RICO Act relating to attempts to overturn results in the 2020 presidential election. Clark turned himself in to the Fulton County Jail on August 25. On September 5, 2023, Clark, along with co-defendants Mark Meadows and John Eastman, waived his arraignment and entered a written not guilty plea.

Clark has collaborated to Project 2025; he is thanked for his contribution to Chapter 2: "Executive Office of the President of the United States".

On February 7, 2025, Clark was installed as a senior advisor in the Director's Front Office at the Consumer Financial Protection Bureau.

== See also ==
- Eastman memos
- Jeffrey Clark letter
- List of alleged Georgia election racketeers
- List of people granted executive clemency in the second Trump presidency
- Public hearings of the United States House Select Committee on the January 6 Attack

Legal offices
Preceded by John C. Cruden	United States Assistant Attorney General for the Environment and Natural Resources Division; 2018–2021	Succeeded by Todd Kim
Preceded by Ethan Davis; Acting	United States Assistant Attorney General for the Civil Division; Acting; 2020–2021	Succeeded by Brian Boynton; Acting
Government offices
Preceded by Dominic Mancini; Acting	Administrator of the Office of Information and Regulatory Affairs at the Office of Management and Budget; Acting; 2025–present	Incumbent
