= Gregory Jacob =

Legal counsel to former U.S. Vice President Mike Pence

Counsel to the Vice President
- In office March 2020 – January 2021
- Vice President: Mike Pence
- Preceded by: Matthew E. Morgan
- Succeeded by: Josh Hsu

Personal details
- Born: c. 1975 (age c. 50)
- Children: 3
- Education: Amherst College; University of Chicago
- Occupation: Lawyer

Gregory Jacob (born c. 1975) is an American lawyer who was legal counsel to U.S. Vice President Mike Pence during the administration of Donald Trump. He is currently a partner in the Washington office of the law firm, O'Melveny & Myers, specializing in ERISA matters.

Upon learning of attempts to overturn the 2020 United States presidential election, Jacob worked to refute a fringe theory pushed in the Eastman memos by Trump attorney John Eastman that the vice president held unilateral authority to reject States' electors.

== Education ==
Jacob went to Westtown School in West Chester, Pennsylvania, graduating in 1992. Jacob graduated cum laude from Amherst College in 1996 and Law Review from University of Chicago Law School in 1999. He clerked for Judge Jacques Weiner of the 5th U.S. Circuit Court of Appeals in New Orleans.

== Career ==
Starting in 2001, Jacob worked in the U.S. Department of Justice's Office of Legal Counsel. He was Special Assistant for Domestic Policy during the George W. Bush administration. He was also both deputy solicitor and solicitor at the U.S. Department of Labor during the George W. Bush administration. Jacob joined the Pence administration eight months before the January 6 attack on the U.S. Capitol.

== Role in 2020 election dispute ==
On December 8, 2020, he wrote a four-page memo to Vice President Pence outlining the constitutional issues at stake in the 12th amendment and the Electoral Count Act of 1887, the Act created out of a contested election detailing a procedure where the 12th Amendment was silent. Jacob disagreed with Eastman on the prudence of invoking the ECA on January 6, which to that point had been attempted only unsuccessfully. The act was revised by congress in 2021.

In the days leading up to the January 6 Senate session for the 2021 United States Electoral College vote count, Jacob wrote another memo stating that any attempt to delay the count would likely be overturned in court. Jacob's advice informed Pence's decision to resist efforts by Trump advisors, including John Eastman, to throw out legitimate electoral votes for Joseph R. Biden Jr.

On January 6, 2021, Vice President Pence read from a revised script drafted in consultation with Jacob. Beginning like his predecessors, Pence sought to "ascertain that the certificates are regular in form and authentic." To this, he added the innovation that "the parliamentarians have advised me is the only certificate of vote from that state, and purports to be a return from the state, and that has annexed to it a certificate from an authority of that state purporting to appoint or ascertain electors."

Also on January 6, while in the Capitol with Pence "in a safe location," Jacob emailed Eastman that "thanks to your bullshit, we are now under siege." Jacob, in a subsequent email, apologized to Eastman for his language, but emphasized that Eastman’s advice “functioned as a serpent in the ear of the President of the United States, the most powerful office in the entire world. And here we are.”

On June 16, 2022, Jacob testified before the United States House Select Committee on the January 6 Attack as to the efforts of Eastman and other Trump advisors to interfere with the certification process, as well as to his experience at the Capitol on January 6. Jacob testified that Pence was consistently skeptical of Eastman's arguments that the vice president could block certification of election results. Jacob also noted that Eastman acknowledged that in 230 years of precedent, no vice president had sought the power to overturn an election as he had suggested and that he would oppose his own strategy if a Democratic vice president attempted it. Jacob also testified that Eastman acknowledged that his strategy would likely lose 9-0 in front of the U.S. Supreme Court. Jacob further testified that on January 6 at the Capitol, as the Pence entourage was evacuating to an underground loading dock, he could "hear the din of the rioters in the building," at which point the mob was about 40 feet away. Jacob stated that the Secret Service attempted to evacuate Pence but that Pence refused to leave the Capitol because “[t]he vice president did not want to take any chance that the world would see the vice president of the United States fleeing the United States Capitol.” Pence, according to Jacob, did not want to facilitate the rioters' attempts to further disrupt the election certification and was "determined that we would complete the work that we had set out to do that day.”

Jacob also testified in front of a federal grand jury investigating efforts by Trump and his allies to overturn his defeat in the 2020 election. Jacob was questioned about the roles of Eastman and Rudy Giuliani in the election scheme.

== Personal life ==
Jacob is from Millville, New Jersey. He is married and has three children, residing in Northern Virginia.

== Selected publications ==
- To Vice President Pence: January 6th Process for Elector Vote Count
- Draft memo to Washington Post criticizing Trump’s informal legal advisors
