= John Eastman =

American legal scholar (born 1960)

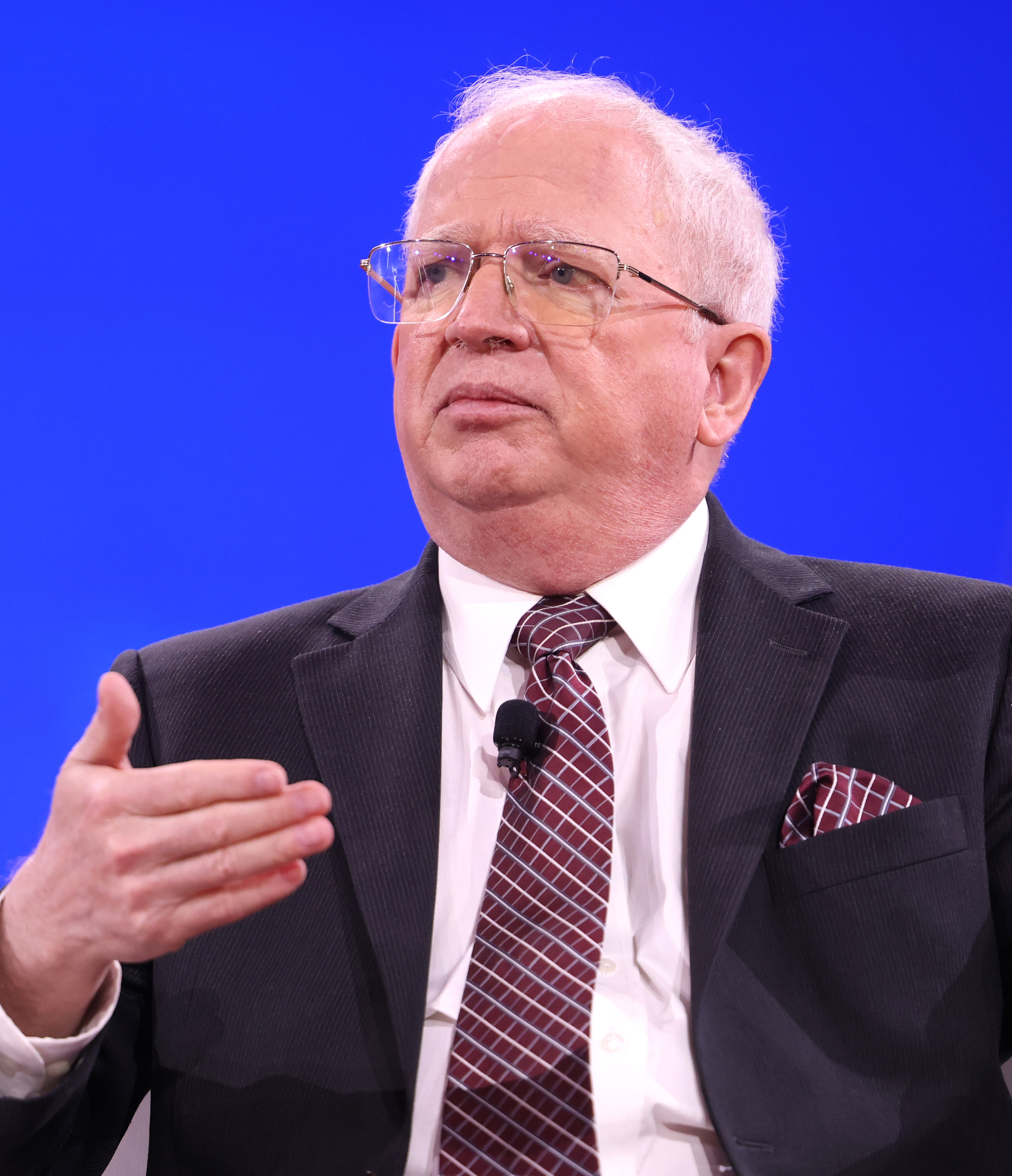
- Eastman in 2025
- Born: John Charles Eastman; 1960 (age 65–66); Lincoln, Nebraska, U.S.
- Education: University of Dallas (BA); Claremont Graduate University (PhD); University of Chicago (JD)
- Political party: Republican
- Eastman's voice Eastman discussing his memos for Donald Trump's 2020 presidential campaign. Published September 27, 2021

John Charles Eastman (born 1960) is an American legal scholar and disbarred lawyer. Eastman became widely known after the 2020 United States presidential election, when he advised then-President Donald Trump. He wrote legal memos arguing that Vice President Mike Pence could reject or delay certification of certain electoral votes. The Supreme Court of California disbarred him from the practice of law in April 2026 for professional misconduct arising from his efforts to overturn the election. As of October 2026, Eastman has petitioned the Supreme Court of the United States to review the disbarment; the petition remains pending and has been distributed for the court's November 6, 2026, conference.

Eastman is the founding director of the Center for Constitutional Jurisprudence, a public-interest law firm affiliated with the Claremont Institute, a conservative think tank. He is a former professor and former dean at Chapman University School of Law. He was the Republican nominee for California's 34th congressional district in 1990, and a candidate for California Attorney General in 2010. He is a former law clerk to Supreme Court Justice Clarence Thomas.

During President Donald Trump's last efforts to block the certification of Joe Biden's Electoral College victory, Eastman told Vice President Mike Pence on January 5, 2021, that Pence had the constitutional authority to block the certification. Pence did not accept Eastman's argument. Eastman also sent Republican senator Mike Lee a six-point plan of action for Pence to throw out the electors from seven states to keep Trump in power, which Lee rejected. On January 6, 2021, Eastman spoke at the White House Trump rally preceding the 2021 United States Capitol attack. He retired a week later from the Chapman faculty after controversy surrounding his speech.

In addition to his disbarment, John Eastman has faced multiple legal and professional consequences related to efforts to challenge the 2020 election. In March 2022, federal judge David O. Carter found it "more likely than not" that Eastman and Trump had engaged in a plan to obstruct the certification of the election. The United States House Select Committee on the January 6 Attack later recommended he, along with Trump and potentially others, be charged with obstruction of an official proceeding and conspiracy to defraud the United States. In 2023, Eastman was one of the six alleged co-conspirators listed in the Justice Department's federal indictment of Trump. Eastman was subsequently indicted in state-level election interference cases, including a 2023 Georgia racketeering prosecution and a 2024 Arizona fake electors prosecution, both arising from efforts to challenge the 2020 election. The Georgia charges were dropped in November 2025, and the Arizona charges were dismissed without prejudice in August 2026. As of October 2026, Eastman and other former Arizona defendants are pursuing appellate relief seeking to prevent renewed prosecution.

In November 2025, Trump issued a federal pardon covering Eastman in connection with efforts to overturn the 2020 election, although no federal charges had been made.

== Early life and education ==
Eastman was born in Lincoln, Nebraska. His family moved among several states during his childhood, and by the time he reached high school he was living in Texas. He attended Lewisville High School, where he was on the wrestling team and a member of the National Honor Society.

After high school, Eastman attended the University of Dallas on a scholarship and graduated in 1982 with a bachelor's degree in political science and economics. He then pursued doctoral studies in government at the Claremont Graduate School, where he focused on political philosophy, American government, constitutional law, and international relations. He wrote his doctoral dissertation under William B. Allen. He earned a Master of Arts in government in 1989 and his Ph.D. in government in 1993. His doctoral dissertation was titled, On the Perpetuation of Our Institutions: Thoughts on Public Education at the American Founding. During his graduate studies, Eastman also worked as a research associate at the Claremont Institute.

After receiving his doctorate, Eastman attended the University of Chicago Law School, earning his Juris Doctor (J.D.) with high honors in 1995. He was elected to the Order of the Coif and served as an editor of the University of Chicago Law Review. During law school, he was also a Bradley Fellow for Research in Constitutional History and an Olin Fellow in Law and Economics.

== Career ==
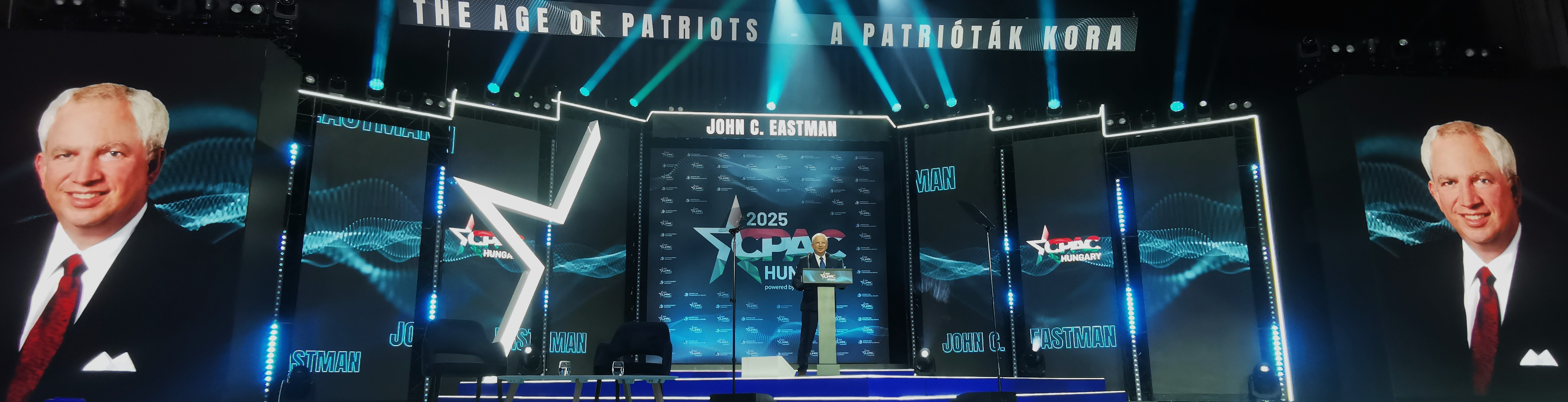
Speaking at CPAC Hungary 2025

In 1989, prior to attending law school, Eastman served as the director of Congressional and public affairs at the United States Commission on Civil Rights. He was also the unsuccessful 1990 Republican candidate for the United States House of Representatives in California's 34th congressional district.

Following law school, he clerked for Judge J. Michael Luttig at the United States Court of Appeals for the Fourth Circuit, who has since denounced Eastman for assisting Trump's efforts to remain in power and subvert the results of the 2020 election. Eastman also clerked for Justice Clarence Thomas at the Supreme Court of the United States. He then was an attorney with the law firm of Kirkland & Ellis, specializing in civil and constitutional litigation. He later joined Chapman to teach constitutional law, was appointed dean, and founded the school's Center for Constitutional Jurisprudence. For the 2020–2021 academic year, he was the Visiting Scholar in Conservative Thought and Policy at the Bruce D. Benson Center for the Study of Western Civilization at the University of Colorado Boulder.

Eastman served as an attorney for the State of South Dakota, representing it in a denied petition to the U.S. Supreme Court in a constitutional challenge to federal spending.

Eastman has represented the North Carolina legislature and the State of Arizona in unsuccessfully petitioning the Supreme Court in cases involving same-sex marriage, abortion, and immigration.

He testified before the Senate Judiciary Committee in 2014 arguing that President Barack Obama's unilateral suspension of deportation for undocumented immigrants was unconstitutional and regarding the disclosure by the IRS of tax returns.

In addition to scholarly publications, Eastman has been a legal commentator on ABC, CBS, NBC, Fox News, CNN, BBC World News, and PBS, while his papers and commentary regarding the constitution and the courts have been published in the ABA Journal, The New York Times, Washington Post, Wall Street Journal, U.S. News & World Report, National Review, Los Angeles Times, The Economist, The Atlantic, Slate, and National Catholic Register. He has also appeared on conservative pundit Hugh Hewitt's Fox News program The Hugh Hewitt Show, commenting on law.

=== 1990 congressional campaign ===
In 1990 Eastman was unopposed in the primary to become the Republican challenger of long-time 34th District incumbent Esteban Torres in California's San Gabriel Valley. He lost the two-candidate general election, getting 36,024 out of 91,670 votes.

=== California Attorney General campaign ===
On February 1, 2010, Eastman resigned as dean of the Chapman University School of Law to pursue the Republican nomination for California Attorney General. On April 1, a Superior Court judge denied Eastman's choice for ballot designation as "Assistant Attorney General", fearing that use of this title, temporarily granted by South Dakota for his work on a lawsuit, would be misperceived as a California title. The judge further denied Eastman's second choice, "Taxpayer Advocate/Attorney", but accepted his third choice, "Constitutional Law Attorney". Such designations typically reflect a candidate's current employment or elected office. Eastman finished second in the three-way Republican primary with 34.2% of the vote, behind Los Angeles County District Attorney Steve Cooley, who received 47.3%. Cooley advanced to the 2010 California Attorney General election, where he was defeated by Kamala Harris.

=== Board affiliations ===
Eastman was chairman of the Federalist Society's practice group on federalism and separation of powers. In 2011 he was named chairman the board of the National Organization for Marriage, which opposes same-sex marriage. He has served as a director of the Public Interest Legal Foundation, which brings election lawsuits. He is both a member of the board and on the faculty at the Claremont Institute. He sits on the board of advisors of St. Monica Academy and the advisory board of the St. Thomas More Society of Orange County.

== Controversies ==
=== Kamala Harris citizenship op-ed ===
In August 2020, Newsweek published an op-ed by Eastman questioning 2020 vice presidential candidate Kamala Harris's eligibility for the office. He asserted she could not be a U.S. citizen by birth despite being born in Oakland, California, if neither of her parents was a permanent resident at the time of her birth. Eastman said that she could have subsequently obtained citizenship derived from the naturalization of her parents if one of them had become a citizen prior to her 16th birthday in 1980, which would have allowed Harris to fulfill the nine-year citizenship requirement necessary to become a senator.

Many prominent legal scholars disagreed with Eastman's position, and many compared it to the birtherism theory against President Barack Obama. Newsweek defended the column, while stating that it was "horrified that this op-ed gave rise to a wave of vile Birtherism directed at Senator Harris", it also said there was no connection between the op-ed and the birther movement. Rather, the op-ed focused on the "long-standing, somewhat arcane legal debate about the precise meaning of the phrase 'subject to the jurisdiction thereof' in the Citizenship Clause of the 14th Amendment", also known as the jus sanguinis or jus soli debate. However, Axios noted that other constitutional scholars do not accept Eastman's view, labeling it "baseless". Axios also criticized Eastman for dismissing the eligibility concerns of 2016 presidential candidate Ted Cruz, born in Calgary, Canada, in a 2016 National Review op-ed, claiming they were "silly".

Erwin Chemerinsky, the dean of Berkeley Law School, told the BBC, "Under section 1 of the 14th Amendment, anyone born in the United States is a United States citizen. The Supreme Court has held this since the 1890s. Kamala Harris was born in the United States." Harvard Professor Laurence Tribe was similarly dismissive, telling The New York Times "I hadn't wanted to comment on [Eastman's idea] because it's such an idiotic theory. There is nothing to it." One day after publishing Eastman's op-ed, Newsweek published an opinion piece by legal scholar Eugene Volokh, titled "Yes, Kamala Harris is Eligible to be Vice President", in which Volokh argues that Harris is a "natural-born citizen" under the U.S. Constitution and is therefore eligible to be vice president. Lorelei Laird, in an Above The Law article, pointed out that according to Eastman's legal theory, Harris would not even be considered a U.S. citizen at all.

This op-ed was cited by the New York Times as helping Eastman come to the attention of Jenna Ellis, a Trump campaign adviser. Eastman briefly met with Trump campaign advisors in a Philadelphia hotel room the weekend after the 2020 presidential election. According to Eastman, he caught COVID-19 at that time.

In early December 2020, Trump contacted Eastman, asking him to challenge the results of the 2020 United States presidential election before the Supreme Court.

=== 2020 presidential election ===
==== Legal strategies to reject electoral votes ====
On December 9, 2020, Eastman represented Trump in a motion to intervene in Texas v. Pennsylvania, a case filed directly in the U.S. Supreme Court by Texas attorney general Ken Paxton, in which the state of Texas sought to annul the voting processes and, by extension, the electoral college results of at least four other states. Eastman's brief included an array of unfounded claims and asserted "It is not necessary for [Trump] to prove that fraud occurred", as well as that it was enough to show that elections "materially deviated" from the intent of state lawmakers, adding, "By failing to follow the rule of law, these officials put our nation's belief in elected self-government at risk." Two days later, on December 12, the Supreme Court declined to hear the case, finding that Texas did not have standing saying Texas "has not demonstrated a judicially cognizable interest in the manner in which another state conducts its elections". On December 13, 2020, 159 Chapman University faculty members (including two from the law school) published a statement condemning Eastman for the filing.

On December 22, 2020, Ivan Raiklin, an attorney and associate of Michael Flynn, tweeted to Trump a two-page memo entitled "Operation Pence Card", which Trump retweeted two days later. The day of the Trump retweet, someone in the Trump administration called Eastman asking him to write a memo "asserting the vice president's power to hold up the certification" of the presidential election. Eastman circulated a two-page outline and memo to the Trump legal team several days later, followed by a more extensive memo later. Eastman called the vice president "the ultimate arbiter" of the election in his two-page memo. After receiving sharp criticism about his role in the election aftermath, in October 2021 Eastman asserted the memos did not convey his advice but rather he had written them at the request of "somebody in the legal team" whose name he could not recall. He also asserted in October that a scenario in which Pence would reject ballots was "foolish" and "crazy", further claiming he had told Pence during their Oval Office meeting that his proposal was an "open question" and "the weaker argument". In a video taken secretly and made public that same month, Eastman suggested he believed that Pence's actions served Washington politics. An audience member asked, "Why do you think Mike Pence didn't do it?" Eastman responded that "Mike Pence is an establishment guy" who fears that Trump is "destroying the inside-the-Beltway Republican Party".

On December 24, 2020, in an email exchange with New York appellate attorney Kenneth Chesebro and Trump campaign officials, Eastman wrote he was aware of a "heated fight" within the Supreme Court about whether to hear a case. The court had already rejected a major election challenge, Texas v. Pennsylvania, 13 days earlier, and the participants in Eastman's email exchange were discussing whether to file papers in the hopes that four U.S. Supreme Court justices would agree to hear a Wisconsin case. Eastman wrote: "the odds are not based on the legal merits but an assessment of the justices' spines." Chesebro responded: "the odds of action before Jan. 6 will become more favorable if the justices start to fear that there will be 'wild' chaos on Jan. 6 unless they rule by then, either way." (Chesebro apparently referred to Trump's tweet five days earlier inviting supporters to a "wild" January 6 protest.) Chesebro had emailed Rudy Giuliani 11 days earlier with a proposal for Pence to recuse himself from the January 6 certification so a senior Republican senator could count fraudulent elector slates to declare Trump the victor.

On January 2, 2021, Eastman joined Trump, the president's personal attorney Rudy Giuliani and others in a conference call with 300 Republican legislators from Arizona, Michigan, Pennsylvania, and Wisconsin to brief them on allegations of voter fraud, with the objective of the legislators attempting to decertify their states' election results. That same day, together with Giuliani and Boris Epshteyn, he appeared on Steve Bannon's podcast The War Room and promoted the idea that state lawmakers needed to reconsider the election results. On January 5, 2021, Eastman met with Pence in the Oval Office to argue, incorrectly, that the vice president has the constitutional authority to alter or otherwise change electoral votes. According to Eastman, he told the vice president that he might have the authority to reject electoral college votes, and he asked the vice president to delay the certification. Pence rejected Eastman's argument and instead agreed with his counsel, Greg Jacob, and conservative legal scholars and other advisors, such as John Yoo and J. Michael Luttig. Pence later released a letter stating he would not attempt to intervene in the certification process, citing Luttig by name, who later said it was "the highest honor of my life" to be involved in preserving the Constitution.

=== Actions during the January 6th attack on the Capitol ===
On January 6, Eastman spoke alongside Giuliani at the "Save America" rally that preceded the 2021 storming of the United States Capitol and asserted without evidence that balloting machines contained "secret folders" that altered voting results.

During the Capitol storming, when Pence was forced into hiding, Eastman exchanged e-mails with Greg Jacob, Pence's chief counsel. Jacob wrote to Eastman, "Thanks to your bullshit, we are now under siege." Eastman replied by blaming Pence and Jacob for refusing to block certification of Trump's loss in the election, writing, "The 'siege' is because YOU and your boss did not do what was necessary to allow this to be aired in a public way so that the American people can see for themselves what happened." Later in the day, when the rioters were expelled from the Capitol and Pence was again presiding over Congress, Eastman told Jacob in another e-mail that Pence should still refuse to certify the election results: "Now that the precedent has been set that the Electoral Count Act is not quite so sacrosanct as was previously claimed, I implore you to consider one more relatively minor violation and adjourn for 10 days to allow the legislatures to finish their investigations as well as to allow the full forensic audit of the massive amount of illegal activity that occurred here", Eastman wrote.

Trump and his campaign refused to pay Eastman for his services or reimburse his expenses, even after Eastman requested payment shortly after the events of January 6, 2021.

=== Aftermath of January 6 ===
==== Congressional and FBI/DOJ investigations ====
According to testimony given to the January 6 Committee by former White House lawyer Eric Herschmann, Eastman emailed Giuliani several days after the storming of the Capitol, asking to be placed on the list of those to be given a presidential pardon before Trump's term in office ended. The request came a few days after a heated exchange between Herschmann and Eastman that ended with Herschmann suggesting that Eastman hire a criminal defense lawyer. Eastman emailed Giuliani, saying "I've decided that I should be on the pardon list if that is still in the works." Trump did not issue a pardon to Eastman.

Appearing on CNN on January 23 to argue that the Trump rally did not incite the siege of the Capitol, Eastman asserted that "a paramilitary group as well as antifa groups" had been organizing "three or four days ahead of time". Eastman asserted this had been reported by The Washington Post days earlier, though the article he appeared to reference did not support his assertion and did not mention antifa. The FBI had announced two weeks earlier there was no evidence of antifa involvement in the siege. Eastman referred to an "antifa and BLM guy" who had been arrested after the Capitol incursion, an apparent reference to John Earle Sullivan, a Utah man who some characterized as an "antifa leader" who had supposedly infiltrated the rally crowd to instigate the insurgency. Federal authorities had not identified the man as an antifa activist. Black Lives Matter Utah had for months disassociated itself from Sullivan on concerns he might be associated with the Proud Boys.

Eastman asserted his Fifth Amendment right to avoid self-incrimination on December 1, 2021, in a letter in which he refused to testify to the United States House Select Committee on the January 6 Attack. CNN reported Eastman met with the committee but invoked the Fifth Amendment 146 times.

On January 20, 2022, he sued the House Select Committee. The case was Eastman v. Thompson in the Southern Division of the U.S. District Court for the Central District of California. It was closed as moot in early 2023.

==== Effort to withhold emails ====
In an effort to withhold 19,000 emails subpoenaed by the committee, in January 2022 an attorney for Eastman told a federal judge that they were protected by attorney-client privilege because Eastman had been representing Trump while participating in the January 2 conference call with state legislators; the January 3 Oval Office meeting with Trump and Pence; and while working as a member of the Trump team at the Willard Hotel command center. Eastman had not previously asserted privilege. The emails were stored on servers at Eastman's former employer, Chapman University, which had been subpoenaed and did not object to their release. The judge ordered the emails released to Eastman's legal team to identify which they asserted were privileged, before allowing a third party to scrutinize them. Eastman relinquished nearly 8,000 emails to the committee in February 2022 but asserted privilege for about 11,000 others.

As Eastman sought to withhold some emails, in March 2022 the committee continued to seek them, stating in a federal court filing that the evidence it had acquired "provides, at minimum, a good-faith basis for concluding" Trump and his campaign violated multiple laws in a criminal conspiracy to defraud the United States by attempting to prevent Congress from certifying his defeat. The filing included an excerpt of a January 6 email exchange with Pence aide Greg Jacob in which Eastman stated, "I implore you to consider one more relatively minor violation [of the Electoral Count Act] and adjourn for 10 days to allow the legislatures to finish their investigations, as well as to allow a full forensic audit of the massive amount of illegal activity that has occurred here." Douglas Letter, general counsel to the House, said about Eastman asking Pence to delay Biden's certification, "It was so minor it could have changed the entire course of our democracy. It could have meant the popularly elected president could have been thwarted from taking office. That was what Dr Eastman was urging." Eastman's assertion of privilege for 101 emails was rejected by Judge David O. Carter in March 2022, who ordered the emails to be produced to the committee. Carter wrote that Trump and Eastman likely conspired in criminal obstruction of Congress, adding, "If Dr. Eastman and President Trump's plan had worked, it would have permanently ended the peaceful transition of power, undermining American democracy and the Constitution."

==== Continued efforts to 'de-certify' the election ====
Seventeen months after the election, Eastman continued to press state legislatures to "de-certify" their election results. Some legal experts said his continued efforts might increase his criminal legal exposure, though if he were charged he might assert his persistent efforts showed he truly believed the election was stolen.

In May 2022, the University of Colorado, where Eastman was a visiting professor, released an email Eastman sent to Pennsylvania legislator Russ Diamond in December 2020. In the email, Eastman described a plan by which the Pennsylvania legislature could act to reverse Biden's victory in the state and declare Trump the winner. The plan called for legislators to express concern about absentee ballots to justify disqualifying tens of thousands of them, then using historical voting data to "discount each candidates' totals by a prorated amount" to arrive at a significant Trump lead. He wrote this new "untainted popular vote" would "help provide some cover" for the legislature to create a slate of Trump electors for certification.

==== Failure to release documents ====
In a late-night court filing on May 19, 2022, Eastman disclosed he had routinely communicated with Trump directly or via "six conduits" regarding legal strategy leading up to January 6, detailing "two hand-written notes from former President Trump about information that he thought might be useful for the anticipated litigation." Eastman made the disclosure to claim attorney-client privilege to prevent the January 6 committee from obtaining 600 of his emails.

On June 7, Carter ruled that Eastman must disclose an additional 159 sensitive documents to the committee. Ten documents related to three December 2020 meetings by a secretive group strategizing about how to overturn the election, which included what Carter characterized as a "high-profile" leader. Carter noted one email in particular that contained what he found was likely evidence of a crime and ordered it disclosed under the crime-fraud exception to the attorney-client privilege. The email content in question was a comment by an unidentified attorney that litigating a case regarding the January 6 session in Congress might "tank the January 6 strategy" and so the Trump legal team should avoid the courts. Carter concluded it showed the Trump legal team had decided to "evade judicial review to overturn a democratic election" and "forged ahead with a political campaign to disrupt the electoral count".

On June 15, 2022, the Washington Post reported that the January 6 committee had recently acquired emails between Eastman and Ginni Thomas, wife of Supreme Court justice Clarence Thomas, and the New York Times reported that the committee had obtained the Eastman–Chesebro email exchange from December 24, 2020. Eastman and the Thomases are longtime friends.

Days after it became known Eastman and Thomas had communicated by email, Eastman posted on his blog an email that he captioned, "OMG, Mrs. Thomas asked me to give an update about election litigation to her group. Stop the Presses!" In the December 4, 2020 email, Thomas invited Eastman to speak four days later at a gathering of "Frontliners", which she described as a group of "grassroots state leaders". A private Facebook group named "FrontLiners for Liberty", which included over 50 people and was created in August 2020, showed Thomas as an administrator. The group's front page carried a banner stating, "the enemy of America...is the radical fascist left." After CNBC asked Thomas about the group, its public pages were either made private or deleted. The Thomas email was among those Carter ordered Eastman to release to the January 6 committee.

On June 22, 2022, several FBI agents approached him as he was leaving a New Mexico restaurant and, pursuant to a warrant, seized his phone. According to the warrant, the phone was to be taken to a forensic lab of the Department of Justice's Office of Inspector General. On June 27, Eastman asked a federal judge to compel the government to return his phone and destroy its records of the phone's contents. Federal judge Robert Brack rejected Eastman's request on July 15. Federal investigators obtained a subsequent warrant to search the phone on July 12.

Judge Carter ruled in October 2022 that Eastman must turn over an additional 33 documents to the January 6 committee, including eight he determined were ineligible for attorney-client privilege because they related to possible criminal activity. Carter found that one Eastman email exchange showed Trump had sworn under oath that the number of alleged voting fraud cases his attorneys cited in a Georgia federal suit was accurate, though he knew it was not. One of the eight emails showed Eastman agreeing with Chesebro that bringing a legal argument to Supreme Court justice Clarence Thomas would be "our only chance to get a favorable judicial opinion by Jan. 6, which might hold up the Georgia count in Congress". Chesebro continued, "We want to frame things so that Thomas could be the one to issue some sort of stay or other circuit justice opinion saying Georgia is in legitimate doubt." Thomas is the Circuit Justice, assigned to act on emergency appeals, for cases in the Eleventh Circuit which includes Georgia.

On October 2, 2023, the Supreme Court rejected Eastman's appeal over the 10 emails he had wanted to shield from congressional investigators. Justice Clarence Thomas had recused himself from the ruling.

==== Criminal referral ====
On December 19, 2022, Eastman and Trump were publicly named during a televised January 6 Committee hearing as being among those who the committee wanted charged for the January 6, 2021 U.S. Capitol attack.

=== Wikipedia editing ===
On January 7, 2021, Eastman edited this Wikipedia article to portray his post-election activities in a more favorable light, in violation of Wikipedia's conflict-of-interest guidelines. His edits were reverted, and on January 9 he appealed on the article's talk page, where some changes were approved but others were denied.

=== Repercussions at universities ===
On January 9, 2021, the chairman of Chapman's board of trustees and two other members (including former Democratic Congresswoman Loretta Sanchez) called on the university's president and provost and the law school's dean "to promptly take action against Eastman for his role in the events of Jan. 6". Eastman responded that he was speaking two miles away from the Capitol building. Four days later, Chapman announced that Eastman had agreed to retire from the university, and the university's president, Daniele C. Struppa, said that Eastman and the university had "agreed not to engage in legal actions of any kind, including any claim of defamation that may currently exist, as both parties move forward". Eastman published a statement the next day saying that those who publicly condemned him "have created such a hostile environment for me that I no longer wish to be a member of the Chapman faculty, and am therefore retiring from my position, effective immediately". He said he would continue with his Spring 2021 position as visiting professor of Conservative Thought and Policy at the University of Colorado and intended to then devote full-time effort to his position as director of the Claremont Institute's Center for Constitutional Jurisprudence.

The University of Colorado cancelled Eastman's Spring 2021 courses due to low enrollment. The university also revoked some of Eastman's public-facing duties but permitted him to conduct scholarship.

=== California State Bar investigation and charges ===
On October 4, 2021, a bipartisan group of attorneys, including two former federal judges and two former justices of the California Supreme Court, filed a complaint with the State Bar of California asking for an investigation of Eastman relating to "his representation of former President Donald J. Trump in efforts to discredit and overturn the results of the 2020 presidential election". In March 2022, the State Bar of California announced that since September 2021, it had been investigating claims of possible violations of law and ethics rules by Eastman. Eastman's attorney said he expected Eastman to be exonerated. On January 26, 2023, Eastman was charged with multiple disciplinary counts by the State Bar of California.

Eastman faces eleven disciplinary charges, all arising from allegations that he was behind Trump's plan to obstruct the count of electoral votes. He is accused of making false and misleading statements regarding alleged election fraud — including claims he made at a rally at the Ellipse outside the White House that preceded the deadly riot at the U.S. Capitol on January 6, 2021. The California bar directly connects Eastman's speech to the insurrection, saying he "contributed to provoking a crowd to assault and breach the Capitol to intimidate then-Vice President [Mike] Pence and prevent the electoral count from proceeding."

New York University law school professor and legal ethic expert Stephen Gillers termed the accusations against Eastman "scathing", saying that the Bar was charging him with failure to support the country's and California's constitutions, despite taking an oath to do so and, "The allegation that Eastman is guilty of 'moral turpitude'", is an attack on his personal and professional character. The California bar determined Eastman made, "false and misleading statements that constitute acts of ... dishonesty, and corruption". "There is nothing more sacrosanct to our American democracy than free and fair elections and the peaceful transfer of power". The Bar's committee chair said, "For California attorneys, adherence to the U.S. and California Constitutions is their highest legal duty", adding Eastman, "violated this duty in furtherance of an attempt to usurp the will of the American people and overturn election results for the highest office in the land — an egregious and unprecedented attack on our democracy — for which he must be held accountable".

On April 4, 2024, Eastman said on a streaming program: "We have a disagreement on the facts of the 2020 election and we have a disagreement on constitutional interpretation". This, he said, should not have prompted "disciplinary action" against him.

==== Trial ====
On June 20, 2023, Eastman's trial before the California Bar Court began. After an eight-week pause, on August 24, Matthew A. Seligman, an expert witness for the prosecution, submitted a 91-page report arguing that Eastman's positions — that Pence had had "unilateral authority" related to the electoral vote counting procedures — were not "reasonable". In August, Eastman asked a judge to further postpone the disbarment proceedings, as he was concerned he might soon be criminally indicted on federal charges. Days earlier, in the United States of America v. Donald J. Trump indictment, he was mentioned as "Co-conspirator No. 2" (as confirmed by his lawyer), though he had not been charged in that indictment. Days later, he was criminally indicted in Fulton County, Georgia. Eastman's postponement request was denied by a judge on the California State Bar Court on August 25, 2023. Eastman called as his first witness, Michael Gableman, a former Wisconsin Supreme Court justice. Gableman previously conducted a 14-month inquiry regarding alleged illegalities in the Wisconsin election in which Biden achieved a 21,000-vote victory; his inquiry found no proof of voting fraud or manipulation. During his testimony to the State Bar, Gableman confirmed the results of his inquiry and admitted that he did not have "any understanding of how elections work".

On November 2, 2023, Judge Yvette Roland made a preliminary ruling that Eastman was "culpable" regarding the eleven counts against him. The trial continued with the presentation of evidence to determine the appropriate level of discipline. Trial and post-trial briefing before the State Bar concluded and the matter was deemed submitted for decision as of December 28, 2023.

On March 27, 2024, Roland issued a ruling recommending that Eastman be disbarred, as well as fined $10,000. Eastman's lawyers said they would appeal. On March 30, 2024, Eastman's law license in California was transferred to "involuntary inactive" status pending his appeal, and as of April 2, his attorney profile page on the State Bar of California's website was marked as "Not Eligible to Practice Law" in California. On May 1, Roland rejected Eastman's request to reactivate his license.

==== Repercussions ====
In 2024, in light of the California Bar Court's ruling, the District of Columbia Court of Appeals imposed reciprocal discipline and suspended Eastman's license with the District of Columbia Bar. On April 15, 2026, the California Supreme Court accepted the lower court recommendation and disbarred Eastman. The California Supreme Court ordered Eastman's name "stricken from the roll of attorneys". Eastman was ordered to pay $5,000 to the state bar. A lawyer for Eastman indicated that he would petition the United States Supreme Court to hear the case. As of October 2026, Eastman's petition for a writ of certiorari is pending before the Supreme Court and has been distributed for the Court's November 6, 2026 conference.

=== Criminal cases ===
==== 2023 indictment in Georgia ====
Eastman's booking photograph released by the Fulton County, Georgia, sheriff's office

In 2023, Eastman and 18 other people were indicted by a Fulton County, Georgia, grand jury in the prosecution for participating in Donald Trump's efforts to overturn the results of the 2020 United States presidential election in Georgia. Eastman faced nine charges in Georgia: two counts of conspiracy to commit forgery in the first degree; two counts of conspiring to commit false statements and writings; one count of violating the Georgia RICO Act; one count of solicitation of violation of oath by public officer; one count of conspiring to impersonate a public officer; one count of conspiring to file false documents; and one count of filing false documents. On September 5, 2023, Eastman waived his arraignment and entered a written not guilty plea. On November 27, 2023, Eastman requested that defendants be split into two groups for trials, with Trump being tried separately later, so that the other defendants may reach trial sooner. Eastman's attorney contended that the presence of Secret Service in the courtroom would otherwise cause delays in the trials of the other defendants.

On November 26, 2025, however, a prosecutor dropped all charges against all remaining defendants, including Eastman, ending the case.

==== 2024 indictment in Arizona ====
Eastman's alleged role as "a legal architect of the plan" to advance "fake electors" in Arizona led to his indictment on conspiracy, fraud and forgery charges there in April 2024. On May 17, 2024, Eastman would be the first of 18 defendants to be arraigned in court for the case involving the conspiracy to overturn the Arizona election results with the use of fake electors. He would be arraigned at the Maricopa County Superior Court after being arrested. The same day, he entered a plea of not guilty, stating that "I had zero communications with the electors in Arizona (and) zero involvement in any of the election litigation in Arizona or legislative hearings. And I am confident that with the laws faithfully applied, I will be fully be exonerated at the end of this process." Eastman was released from custody without conditions the same day. In May 2025, the judge ordered the case back to the grand jury because the jury was not shown a copy of the applicable law in violation of the "substantial procedural right" of the defendants. In November 2025, the appeal to the May decision failing, the state Attorney General Kris Mayes appealed to the state Supreme Court. The Arizona Supreme Court denied the appeal on June 4, 2026, leaving in place the order returning the case to a grand jury. On August 7, 2026, Judge Sam Myers dismissed the remaining prosecution without prejudice, expressly leaving prosecutors free to seek new indictments. As of October 2026, Eastman and several other former defendants are pursuing appellate review of claims under Arizona's anti-SLAPP law, seeking to prevent renewed prosecution.

==== Federal pardon ====
On November 7, 2025, President Donald Trump issued a pardon for seventy-seven people who had been connected to attempts to overturn the 2020 election. Eastman was on this list. Neither he nor any of the others on the list had faced federal charges, which are the only charges that the president can pardon.

== See also ==
- Donald Trump and fascism
- List of alleged Georgia election racketeers
- List of law clerks for the tenth seat of the Supreme Court of the United States
- List of people granted executive clemency in the second Trump presidency

Academic offices
Preceded by Parham Williams	3rd Dean of the Chapman University School of Law; 2007–2010	Succeeded by Tom Campbell
