= Patrick Philbin =

Patrick Philbin may refer to:

- Patrick F. Philbin, American lawyer and political appointee in the Trump and Bush administrations
- Patrick Philbin (athlete) (1874–1929), British tug of war competitor at the 1908 Summer Olympics
