= January 6th Committee =

US House of Representatives select committee

Select Committee to Investigate the January 6th Attack on the United States Capitol
Select committee
- United States House of Representatives; 117th Congress

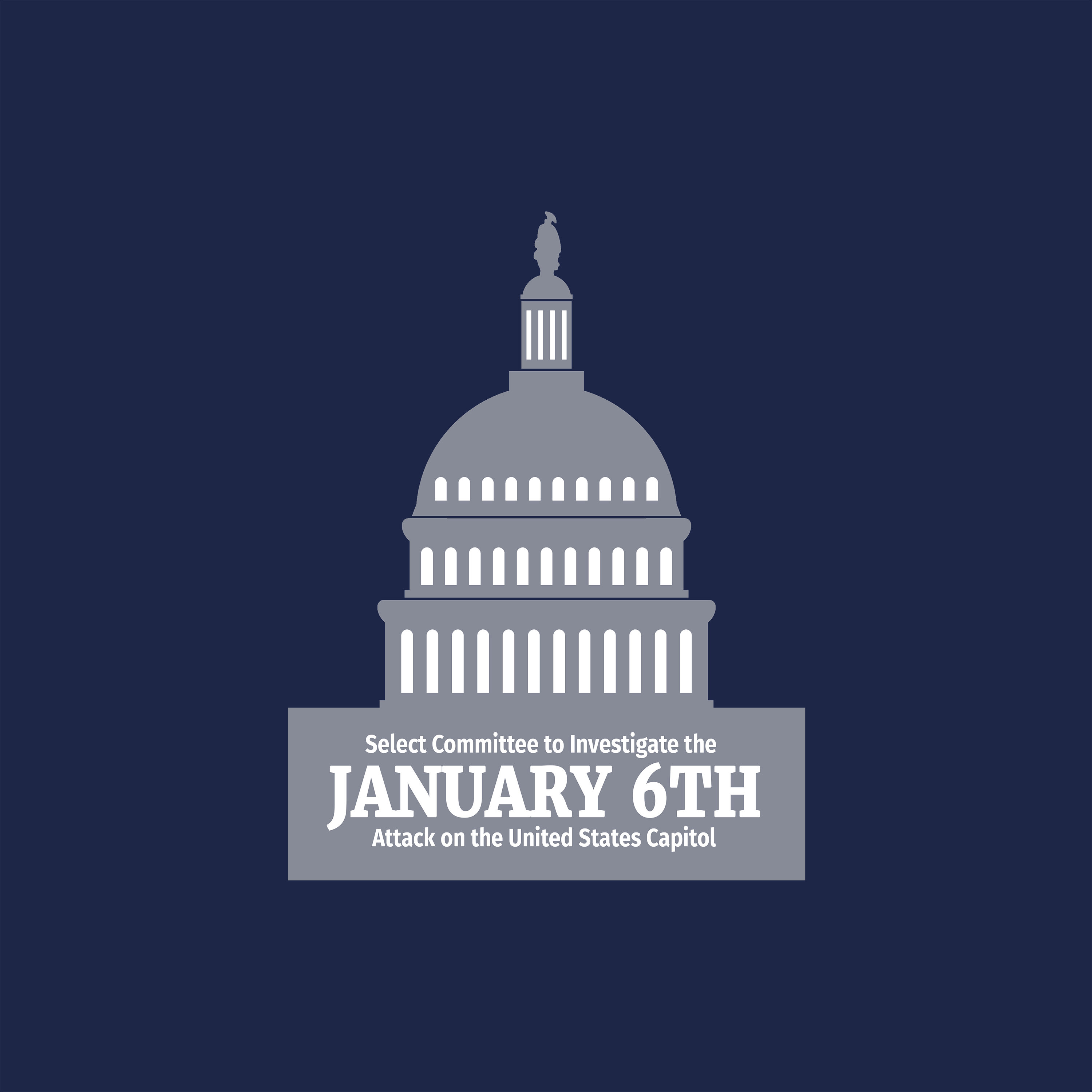
- Committee logo

History
- Status: Completed 18 month investigation and published 814-page final report
- Formed: July 1, 2021
- Disbanded: January 3, 2023

Leadership
- Chair: Bennie Thompson (D); Since July 1, 2021
- Vice Chair: Liz Cheney (R); Since September 2, 2021

Structure
- Seats: 9
- Political parties: Majority (7): Democratic (7); Minority (2): Republican (2)

Jurisdiction
- Purpose: To investigate the attack on the United States Capitol on January 6, 2021
- Senate counterpart: None

Website
- january6th-benniethompson.house.gov

The United States House Select Committee to Investigate the January 6th Attack on the United States Capitol (commonly referred to as the January 6th Committee) was a select committee of the U.S. House of Representatives established to investigate the U.S. Capitol attack.

After refusing to concede the 2020 U.S. presidential election and perpetuating false and disproven claims of widespread voter fraud, then-president Donald Trump summoned a mob of protestors to the Capitol as the electoral votes were being counted on January 6, 2021. During the House Committee's subsequent investigation, people gave sworn testimony that Trump knew he lost the election. The committee issued a subpoena requiring Trump to testify, identifying him as "the center of the first and only effort by any U.S. President to overturn an election and obstruct the peaceful transition of power". He sued the committee and never testified.

On December 19, 2022, the committee voted unanimously to refer Trump and the lawyer John Eastman to the U.S. Department of Justice for prosecution. The committee recommended charging Trump with obstruction of an official proceeding; conspiracy to defraud the United States; conspiracy to make a false statement; and attempts to "incite", "assist" or "aid or comfort" an insurrection. Obstruction and conspiracy to defraud were also the recommended charges for Eastman. The committee simultaneously released a summary of its findings, and it published the remainder of its 845-page final report three days later. That week, it also began publishing interview transcripts.

The committee interviewed over a thousand people and reviewed over a million documents. Some members of Trump's inner circle cooperated, while others defied the committee. For refusing to testify:

- Two people were convicted of contempt of Congress and were imprisoned for four months: Peter Navarro in March–July 2024, and Steve Bannon in July–October 2024.
- Mark Meadows and Dan Scavino were also held in criminal contempt by Congress (but not prosecuted by DOJ).
- Representatives McCarthy, Jordan, Biggs, and Perry were referred to the House Ethics Committee.

The committee was formed through a largely party-line vote on July 1, 2021, and it dissolved in early January 2023. (Note: The new Congress convened on January 3; new representatives were sworn in four days later.) Its membership was a point of significant political contention. The only two House Republicans to vote to establish the committee were also the only two Republicans to serve on it: Liz Cheney and Adam Kinzinger. (Note: Liz Cheney and Adam Kinzinger had also both voted in January 2021 to impeach Trump for incitement of insurrection.) The Republican National Committee censured them for their participation.

== History ==
On May 19, 2021, in the aftermath of the January 6 United States Capitol attack, the House voted to form an independent bicameral commission to investigate the attack, similar to the 9/11 Commission. The bipartisan Bill passed the House 252–175, with 35 Republicans voting in favor. Minority Leader McCarthy had initially deputized Representative John Katko to negotiate for Republicans but then reversed course and whipped against the proposal; the 35 House Republican defections were perceived as a rebuke of McCarthy. On May 28, in the Senate, Republicans defeated the proposal by filibuster.

Anticipating the defeat of the proposed commission, House speaker Nancy Pelosi indicated that, as a fallback option, she would appoint a select committee to do similar work.

On June 30, 2021, H.Res.503, "Establishing the Select Committee to Investigate the January 6th Attack on the United States Capitol", passed the House 222–190, with all Democratic members and two Republican members, Adam Kinzinger and Liz Cheney, voting in favor. Sixteen Republican members did not vote. The resolution empowered Pelosi to appoint eight members to the committee, and House Minority Leader Kevin McCarthy could appoint five members "in consultation" with the Speaker. Pelosi indicated that she would name a Republican as one of her eight appointees.

On July 1, Pelosi appointed seven Democrats, including Bennie Thompson (D-MS) as committee chair, and one Republican, Liz Cheney (R-WY).

On July 19, McCarthy announced his five selections, recommending Jim Banks (R-IN) serve as Ranking Member, along with Jim Jordan (R-OH), Rodney Davis (R-IL), Kelly Armstrong (R-ND), and Troy Nehls (R-TX). Banks, Jordan, and Nehls had voted to overturn the Electoral College results in Arizona and Pennsylvania. Banks and Jordan had also signed onto the Supreme Court case Texas v. Pennsylvania to invalidate the ballots of voters in four states.

On July 21, Thompson announced that he would investigate Trump as part of the inquiry into the Capitol attack. Hours later, Pelosi announced that she had informed McCarthy that she was rejecting Jordan and Banks, citing concerns for the investigation's integrity and relevant actions and statements made by the two members. She approved the recommendations of the other three. Rather than suggesting two replacements, McCarthy insisted he would not appoint anyone unless all five of his choices were approved. When McCarthy pulled all of his picks, he eliminated all Trump defenders on the committee and cleared the field for Pelosi to control the committee's entire makeup and workings. This was widely interpreted as a costly political miscalculation by McCarthy.

On July 25, after McCarthy rescinded all of his selections, Pelosi announced that she had appointed Adam Kinzinger (R-IL), one of the ten House Republicans who voted for Trump's second impeachment, to the committee. Pelosi also hired a Republican, former Representative Denver Riggleman (R-VA), as an outside committee staffer or advisor. Cheney voiced her support and pushed for the involvement of both.

On February 4, 2022, the Republican National Committee voted to censure Cheney and Kinzinger, which it had never before done to any sitting congressional Republican. The resolution formally dropped "all support of them as members of the Republican Party", arguing that their work on the select committee was hurting Republican prospects in the midterm elections. Kinzinger had already announced on October 29, 2021, that he would not run for reelection. Cheney lost the primary for her reelection on August 16, 2022.

== Members ==
The committee's chair was Bennie Thompson, and the vice chair was Liz Cheney. Seven Democrats and two Republicans sat on the committee.

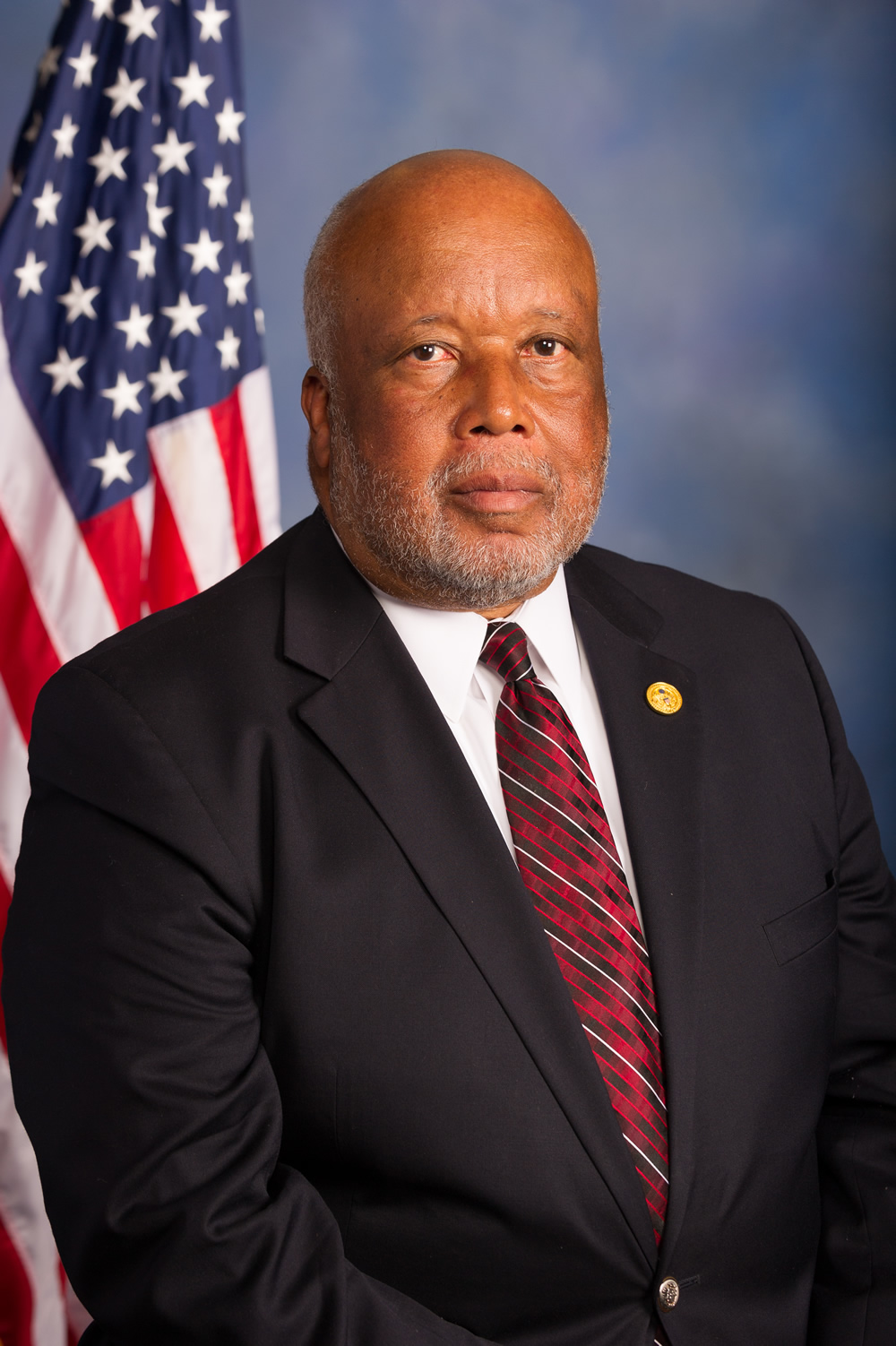
Chair Bennie Thompson

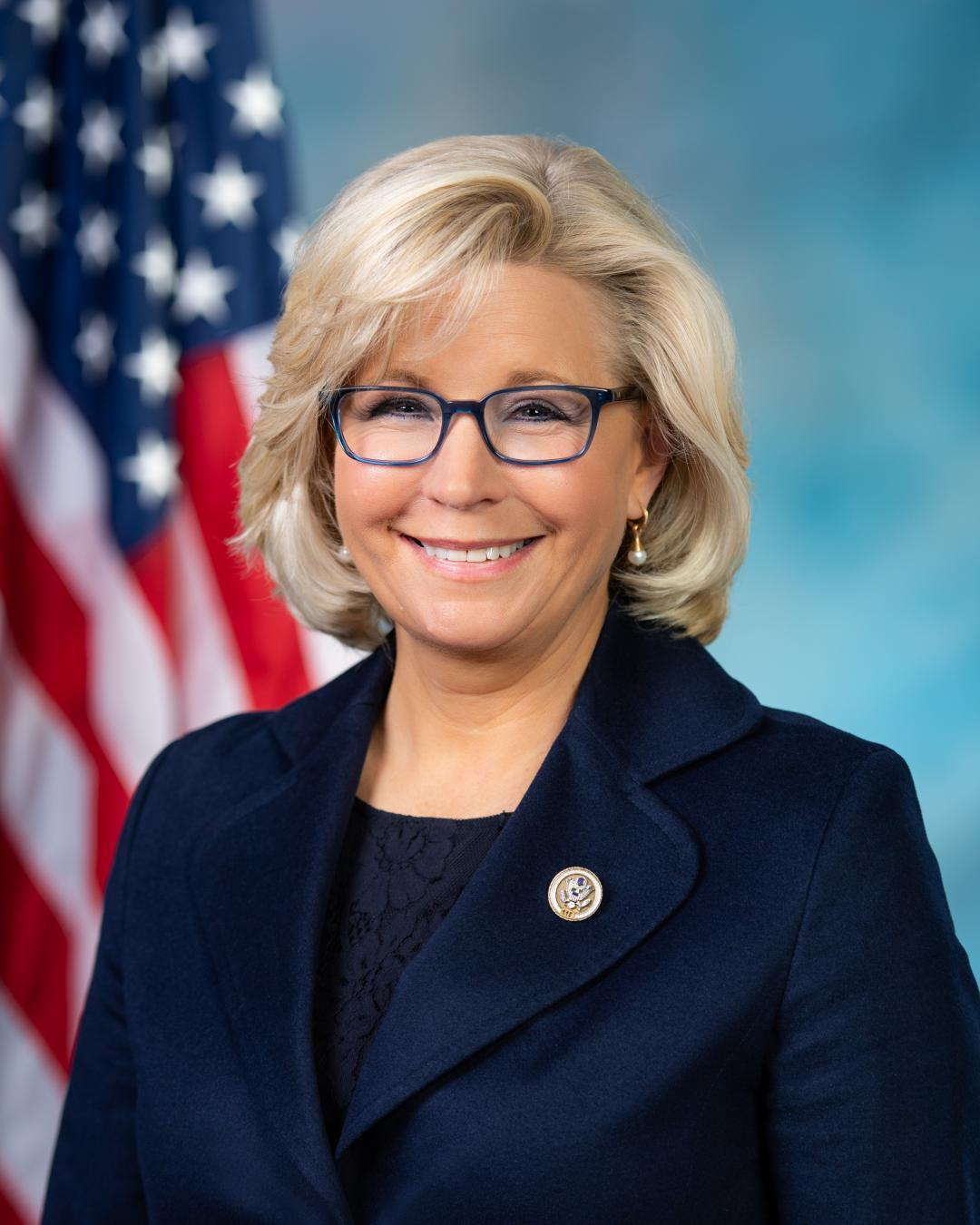
Vice Chair Liz Cheney

Majority	Minority
Bennie Thompson, Chair, Mississippi; Zoe Lofgren, California; Adam Schiff, California; Pete Aguilar, California; Stephanie Murphy, Florida; Jamie Raskin, Maryland; Elaine Luria, Virginia	Liz Cheney, Vice Chair, Wyoming; Adam Kinzinger, Illinois

In July 2021, Thompson announced the senior staff:

- David Buckley as staff director. Served as CIA inspector general and House Permanent Select Committee on Intelligence minority staff director.
- Kristin Amerling as deputy staff director and chief counsel. Served as deputy general counsel at the Transportation Department and chief counsel of multiple congressional committees, including Committees on Energy and Commerce and Oversight and Government Reform. She also served as Chief Investigative Counsel and Director of Oversight for the Senate's Commerce, Science, and Transportation Committee.
- Hope Goins as counsel to Chairman Thompson. Served as top advisor to Thompson on homeland security and national security matters.
- Candyce Phoenix as senior counsel and senior advisor. Serves as staff director of the House Oversight Subcommittee on Civil Rights and Civil Liberties.
- Tim Mulvey as communications director. Served as communications director for the House Committee on Foreign Affairs.

In August 2021, Thompson announced additional staff:

- Denver Riggleman, senior technical adviser for the January 6 Committee. He previously served as a Republican U.S. Representative from Virginia and was an ex-military intelligence officer.
  - Riggleman left the committee in April 2022.
- Joe Maher as principal deputy general counsel from the Department of Homeland Security.
- Timothy J. Heaphy was appointed as the committee's chief investigative counsel.

In November 2022, Thompson disclosed the existence of a subcommittee to handle "outstanding issues" including unanswered subpoenas and whether to send transcripts of interviews to the DOJ. The subcommittee had been established about one month earlier with Raskin as chair, along with Cheney, Lofgren, and Schiff. Thompson said he selected them because "they're all lawyers".

On January 20, 2025, hours before President Biden left office, he announced a preemptive pardon to all committee members and staffers, given President-elect Trump's threats against them, as well as to the four police officers who testified.

== Investigation ==
The investigation commenced with a public hearing on July 27, 2021, at which four police officers testified. As of the end of 2021, it had interviewed more than 300 witnesses and obtained more than 35,000 documents, and those totals continued to rise. By May 2022, it had interviewed over 1,000 witnesses; some of those interviews were recorded. By October 2022, it had obtained over 1,000,000 documents and reviewed hundreds of hours of videos (such as security camera and documentary footage). During the pendency of the investigation, the select committee publicly communicated some of its information.

The select committee split its multi-pronged investigation into multiple color-coded teams, each focusing on a specific topic like funding, individuals' motivations, organizational coalitions, and how Trump may have pressured other politicians. These were:

- Green Team investigated the money trail to determine whether Trump and Republican allies, knowing they were spreading false claims and misinformation about the 2020 presidential election, defrauded their own supporters.
- Gold Team investigated whether members of Congress participated or assisted in Trump's attempted to overturn the election. They also examined Trump's pressure campaign on local and state officials and on executive departments — like the Department of Justice, Department of Homeland Security, Department of Defense, and others — to try to keep himself in power.
- Purple Team investigated the involvement of domestic violent extremist groups — such as the QAnon movement, militia groups, Oath Keepers, and Proud Boys — and how they used social media including Facebook, Gab, and Discord.
- Red Team investigated the planners of the January 6th rally and other "Stop the Steal" organizers and whether they knew the rally participants intended violence.
- Blue Team researched the threats leading up to the attack and how law enforcement shared intelligence and prepared (or didn't). Blue Team had access to thousands of documents from more than a dozen agencies.

The select committee's investigation and its findings were multi-faceted.

A reform of election certification procedures (as governed by the Electoral Count Act of 1887) was passed in the December 2022 omnibus spending bill. Committee members had begun collaborating on this reform in 2021.

The select committee's findings may also be used in arguments to hold individuals, notably Donald Trump, legally accountable.

=== Simultaneous investigations by the Justice Department ===
The United States Department of Justice (DOJ) probed the months-long efforts to falsely declare that the election was rigged, including pressure on the DOJ, the fake-electors scheme, and the events of January 6 itself.

While the investigations by the House select committee and the Justice Department were ongoing, the judicial branch made related observations and rulings. In March 2022, federal judge David Carter said it was "more likely than not" that Trump engaged in a conspiracy with John Eastman to commit federal crimes. He described their attempt as "a coup in search of a legal theory".

On November 18, 2022, U.S. Attorney General Merrick Garland announced the appointment of John L. "Jack" Smith as the Special Counsel to oversee the DOJ's ongoing investigations into the FBI investigation into Donald Trump's handling of government documents as well the January 6 investigation. Garland praised Smith's experience and said: "I am confident that this appointment will not slow the completion of these investigations." Smith promised to investigate "independently and in the best traditions of the Department of Justice ... to whatever outcome the facts and the law dictate."

The House select committee shared some information with the DOJ, but it waited until it had finished its work in December 2022 before turning over everything. The DOJ had sent a letter on April 20, 2022, asking for transcripts of past and future interviews. Thompson, the committee chair, told reporters he did not intend to give the DOJ "full access to our product" especially when "we haven't completed our own work". Instead, the select committee negotiated for a partial information exchange. On June 15, the DOJ repeated its request. They gave an example of a problem they had encountered: The trial of the five Proud Boys indicted for seditious conspiracy had been rescheduled for the end of 2022 because the prosecutors and the defendants' counsel did not want to start the trial without the relevant interview transcripts. On July 12, 2022, the committee announced it was negotiating with the DOJ about the procedure for information-sharing and that the committee had "started producing information" related to the DOJ's request for transcripts.

On December 19, 2022, the House select committee publicly voted to recommend that the DOJ bring criminal charges against Trump (a long-anticipated move) as well as against Eastman. Some critics had argued against making criminal referrals, as such a recommendation by a congressional committee has no legal force and could appear to politically taint the DOJ's investigation. However, a committee spokesperson had said on December 6 that criminal referrals would be "a final part" of the committee's investigative work. Schiff acknowledged on December 11 that any referral would be "symbolic" but was nevertheless "important" — he had said in September that he hoped the committee would unanimously refer Trump to the DOJ — while Representative Raskin said on December 13, "Everybody has made his or her own bed in terms of their conduct or misconduct."

On August 1, 2023, a grand jury indicted Trump on four counts. The prosecution continued until Trump won the 2024 presidential election. On November 25, 2024, special counsel Smith filed to drop the charges against Trump, and Judge Chutkan approved the request and dismissed the case. Smith resigned his role of special counsel in January 2025 before Trump's inauguration.

=== Information received from Mark Meadows ===
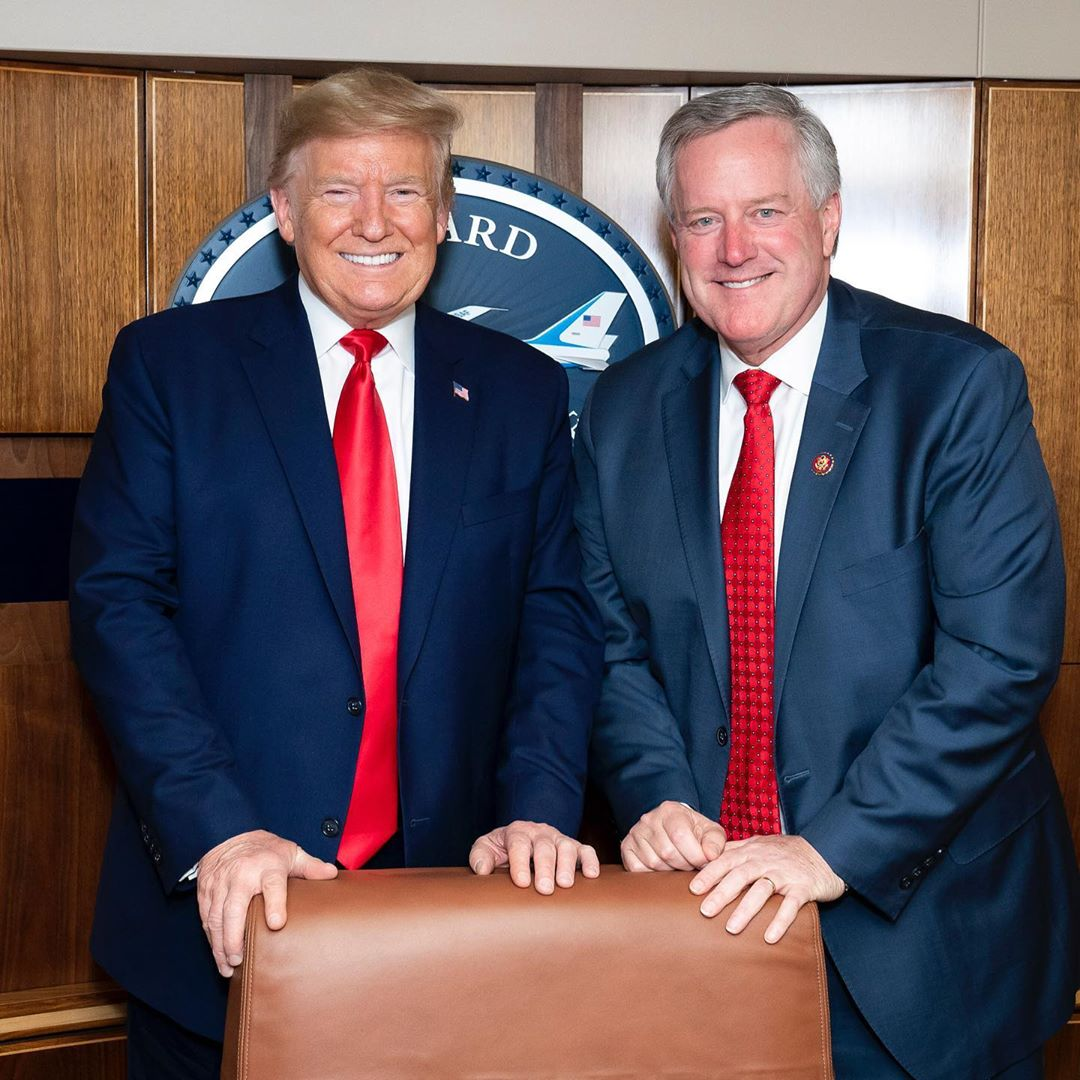
Donald Trump and Mark Meadows in 2020

In September 2021, the select committee subpoenaed former White House chief of staff Mark Meadows. Meadows initially cooperated, but in December, without providing all requested documents, he sued to block the two congressional subpoenas. On December 14, 2021, the full House voted to hold Meadows in contempt of Congress. In a July 15, 2022 amicus brief filed at the request of U.S. District Court Judge Carl J. Nichols, the DOJ acknowledged that the House subpoena had been justified and that Meadows had only "qualified" immunity given that Trump was no longer in office. On October 31, 2022, the judge ruled that the congressional subpoenas were "protected legislative acts" that were "legitimately tied to Congress's legislative functions".

Although the congressional subpoenas were valid, DOJ decided not to criminally charge him for defying them. In 2022, Meadows did comply with a DOJ subpoena in the DOJ investigation of January 6. In 2023, he was indicted in Georgia for his alleged role in election interference in that state.

Meadows had routinely burned documents in his office fireplace after meetings during the transition period; Cassidy Hutchinson testified to the committee that she had seen him do this a dozen times between December 2020 and mid-January 2021.

In late 2021, before Meadows stopped cooperating, he provided thousands of emails and text messages that revealed efforts to overturn the election results:

- The day after the election, former Texas governor and former Secretary of Energy Rick Perry sent Meadows a proposed strategy for Republican-controlled state legislatures to choose electors and send them directly to the Supreme Court before their states had determined voting results.
- Fox News host Sean Hannity exchanged text messages with Meadows suggesting that Hannity was aware in advance of Trump's plans for January 6. Hannity texted on December 31, 2020, that he was afraid that many U.S. attorneys would resign, adding: “I do NOT see Jan. 6 happening the way [Trump] is being told." He texted in the evening of January 5: "I am very worried about the next 48 hours." The committee wrote to Hannity asking him to voluntarily answer questions.
- During the attack, Donald Trump Jr. told Meadows that his father must "lead now" by making an Oval Office address because "[i]t has gone too far. And gotten out of hand."
- Two Fox News allies of Trump texted that the Capitol attack was destroying the president's legacy.
- Representative Jim Jordan asked Meadows if Vice President Mike Pence could identify "all the electoral votes that he believes are unconstitutional".
- The day after the riot, one text stated that "We tried everything we could in our objections to the 6 states. I'm sorry nothing worked."

Meadows also participated in a call with a Freedom Caucus group including Rudy Giuliani, Representative Jim Jordan, and Representative Scott Perry during which they planned to encourage Trump supporters to march to the Capitol on January 6.

Meadows also exchanged post-election text messages with Ginni Thomas, the wife of Supreme Court Justice Clarence Thomas, in which they expressed support of Trump's false claims of election fraud. On November 5, in the first of 29 text messages, Ginni Thomas sent to Meadows a link to a YouTube video about the election. She emailed Arizona and Wisconsin lawmakers on November 9 to encourage them to choose different electors, exchanged emails with John Eastman, and attended the rally on January 6.

Some of the communications revealed Trump allies who privately expressed disagreement with the events of January 6 while defending Trump in public:

- Donald Trump Jr. pleaded with Meadows during the January 6 riot to convince his father that "[i]t has gone too far and gotten out of hand"
- Similarly, Fox News hosts Brian Kilmeade, Sean Hannity, and Laura Ingraham asked Meadows to persuade Trump to appear on TV and quell the riot.

In mid-2022, CNN spoke to over a dozen people who had texted Meadows that day, and all of them said they believed that Trump should have tried to stop the attack.

Meadows pointed the committee toward Phil Waldron, a retired Army colonel (now owning a bar in Texas) who specialized in psychological operations and who later became a Trump campaign associate. Waldron was associated with former Trump national security advisor Michael Flynn and other military-intelligence veterans who played key roles in spreading false information to allege the election had been stolen from Trump.

Waldron had summarized a strategy for overturning the election results. His PowerPoint presentation recommended that Trump declare a national security emergency to delay the January 6 electoral certification, invalidate all ballots cast by machine, and order the military to seize and recount all paper ballots. (Meadows claims he personally did not act on this plan.) A 36-page version appeared to have been created on January 5, and Meadows received a version that day. He eventually provided a 38-page version to the committee. It was among the most revealing documents he provided.

Waldron also originated the idea of a military seizure of voting machines, according to Bernard Kerik's subsequent testimony. The idea of seizing voting machines was proposed as an executive order in two nearly identical drafts dated December 16, both of which Politico published. One of the drafts had apparently been created by attorney and One America News anchor Christina Bobb, who had also been present at the Willard Hotel command center. That draft was found in emails between Waldron, Flynn, Kerik, Washington attorney Katherine Friess, and Texas entrepreneur Russell Ramsland, which Politico also published.

Meadows testified that he organized a daily morning call beginning January 7, 2021, with Mike Pompeo and Mark Milley.

As of August 2023, the extent of Meadows's cooperation in various investigations remained unknown to the public. Prosecutors in the Georgia indictment reportedly do not intend to offer him a plea deal. He has said he wants to be tried separately from the other Georgia defendants. The U.S. Supreme Court denied his request to remove his case to federal court.

=== Obstacles ===
==== Release of documents from the National Archives and Records Administration (NARA) ====
One of the main challenges to the committee's investigation was Trump's use of legal tactics to try to block the release of the White House communication records held at the National Archives and Records Administration (NARA). He succeeded in delaying the release of the documents for about five months. The committee received the documents on January 20, 2022.

Some of the documents had been previously torn up by Trump and taped back together by NARA staff. Trump is said to have routinely shredded and flushed records by his own hand, as well as to have asked staff to place them in burn bags, throughout his presidency. Additionally, as the presidential diarist testified to the committee in March 2022, the Oval Office did not send the diarist detailed information about Trump's daily activities on January 5 and 6, 2021.

Trump's phone records from the day of the attack, as provided by NARA to the committee, did not log any calls during the seven-and-a-half hours that the Capitol was under siege, suggesting he was using a "burner" cell phone during that time. He is said to have routinely used burner phones during his presidency. When the committee subpoenaed his personal communication records, his lawyers claimed he had no such records.

Trump tried to hide the fact that he had pressured the Defense Secretary and DOJ to seize voting machines immediately after the election in six states where he had lost. To prevent the Committee gaining access to relevant White House records, he sought an injunction from the Supreme Court, which dismissed his request on January 19, 2022.

The committee began its request for the NARA records in August 2021. Trump asserted executive privilege over the documents. Then president Joe Biden rejected that claim, as did a federal judge (who noted that Trump was no longer president), the DC Circuit Court of Appeals, and the U.S. Supreme Court. The committee agreed to a Biden administration request for NARA to withhold certain sensitive documents about unrelated national security matters but continued to litigate until it received the potentially relevant records.

==== Republicans not testifying ====
From the beginning of the investigation, Trump told Republican leaders not to cooperate with the committee. While many testified voluntarily, the committee also issued subpoenas to legally compel others' testimony. Some people who were subpoenaed refused to testify: Jeffrey Clark, Roger Stone, John Eastman, Michael Flynn, Alex Jones, and Kelli Ward pleaded their Fifth Amendment rights, while Steve Bannon, Peter Navarro Mark Meadows and Dan Scavino were found in contempt of Congress. In December 2021, Michael Flynn sued to block a subpoena for his phone records and to delay his testimony, though a federal judge dismissed his suit within a day.

Trump White House aide Cassidy Hutchinson spoke to the committee several times in early 2022 while represented by Stefan Passantino, a Trump ally who wanted her to skirt the committee's questions. She spoke to the committee without Passantino's knowledge; former White House aide Alyssa Farah Griffin was her backchannel connection for the additional testimony. Hutchinson later dismissed Passantino, hired Jody Hunt instead, and had another closed-door deposition on June 20, 2022, a week before she appeared at a public hearing. The committee would later recommend that Passantino face charges for witness tampering. In December 2024, the House Administration oversight subcommittee, led by Representative Barry Loudermilk, issued a report saying that Liz Cheney should be the one to be criminally investigated for witness tampering, alleging that she had turned Hutchinson against Passantino. However, Representative Zoe Lofgren pointed out that, under Article One of the Constitution, members of Congress cannot be prosecuted for doing their work. On January 6, 2025, Representative Joseph Morelle, released a report containing an email from Hutchinson's lawyer denying that Hutchinson and Cheney had any "improper communications".

Bill Stepien, Trump's final campaign manager, was subpoenaed and planned to testify live for the second public hearing on June 13, 2022. However, he canceled his appearance an hour before the hearing started, as his wife went into labor. The select committee instead aired clips of Stepien's previously recorded deposition; the scramble to rearrange the presentation delayed the start of the nationally televised hearing by 45 minutes.

On October 21, 2022, the committee subpoenaed Trump for documents and testimony. They requested all his communications on the day of the Capitol attack and many of his political communications in the preceding months. On November 9, Trump's lawyers wrote to the committee saying he possessed "no documents" relevant to the subpoena. On November 11, they sued to block the subpoena, arguing that the committee could obtain the information from sources other than Trump.

Pence chose not to speak to the select committee, though the committee had long deliberated calling him. On January 4, 2022, Chair Thompson told reporters that Pence should "do the right thing and come forward and voluntarily talk to the committee". While acknowledging that the committee had not formally invited Pence to speak to them, Thompson suggested: "if he offered, we'd gladly accept." The committee reportedly considered Pence's testimony particularly important, though, in April, Thompson told reporters they would not bother calling him, especially having already confirmed important information through his former aides Marc Short and Greg Jacob. On August 17, Pence told an audience at Saint Anselm College that he was waiting for the committee to invite him: "If there was an invitation to participate, I'd consider it." He described his experience of the attack on the Capitol in his autobiography, which was scheduled to be published a week after the November 2022 midterm elections. As of late November, Pence was reportedly more interested in testifying before the DOJ. "I think it’s sad that he didn’t want to come to us", Representative Pete Aguilar told CNN in early December 2022.

==== Secret Service, DHS and Pentagon text messages deleted ====
Soon after the attack on the Capitol, the Secret Service assigned new phones. In February 2021, the office of Department of Homeland Security Inspector General Joseph Cuffari, a Trump appointee, learned that text messages of Secret Service agents had been lost. He considered sending data specialists to attempt to retrieve the messages, but a decision was made against it. In June 2021, DHS asked for text messages from 24 individuals—including the heads for Trump and Pence security, Robert Engel and Tim Giebels—and did not receive them. In October 2021, DHS considered publicizing the Secret Service's delays. On July 26, 2022, Chairman Thompson, in his capacity as Chair of the House Homeland Security Committee, and Carolyn Maloney, Chair of the House Oversight & Reforms Committee, jointly wrote to the Council of the Inspectors General on Integrity and Efficiency about Cuffari's failure to report the lost text messages and asked CIGIE chair Allison Lerner to replace Cuffari with a new Inspector General who could investigate the matter. Senator Dick Durbin, who chaired the Senate Judiciary Committee, asked Attorney General Garland to investigate the missing text messages. Biden had made a campaign promise to never fire an inspector general during his tenure as POTUS, and despite calls for him to dismiss Cuffari, Cuffari retained his role throughout the Biden administration.

On August 1, 2022, House Homeland Security Chairman Bennie Thompson reiterated calls for Cuffari to step down due to a "lack of transparency" that could be "jeopardizing the integrity" of crucial investigations regarding the missing Secret Service text messages. That same day, an official inside the DHS inspector general's office told Politico that Cuffari and his staff are "uniquely unqualified to lead an Inspector General's office, and ... the crucial oversight mission of the DHS OIG has been compromised." Congress also obtained a July 2021 e-mail, from deputy inspector general Thomas Kait, who told senior DHS officials there was no longer a need for any Secret Service phone records or text messages. Efforts to collect communications related to Jan. 6 were therefore shutdown by Kait just six weeks after the internal DHS investigation began. The Guardian wrote that "taken together, the new revelations appear to show that the chief watchdog for the Secret Service and the DHS took deliberate steps to stop the retrieval of texts it knew were missing, and then sought to hide the fact that it had decided not to pursue that evidence."

On August 2, 2022, CNN reported that relevant text messages from January 6, 2021, were also deleted from the phones of Trump-appointed officials at the Pentagon, despite the fact that FOIA requests were filed days after the attack on the Capitol. The Secret Service was later reported to have been aware of online threats against lawmakers before the attack on the Capitol, according to documents obtained by the House select committee.

==== Trump funding legal defense of Republican witnesses ====
Trump's Save America PAC has paid hundreds of thousands of dollars to lawyers representing over a dozen witnesses called by the committee. On September 1, 2022, Trump said on a right-wing radio show that he had recently met supporters in his office. He said he was "financially supporting" them, adding: "It's a disgrace what they've done to them."

The American Conservative Union provided legal defense funds for some people who resist the committee. The organization said it only assisted people who do not cooperate with the committee and who opposed its mission, according to chairman Matt Schlapp.

==== Republican National Committee (RNC) claiming committee is illegitimate ====
Though the Republican National Committee had long insisted that the committee is invalid and should not be allowed to investigate, a federal judge found on May 1, 2022, that the committee's power is legitimate.

== Public findings ==
=== 2022 public hearings ===
In 2022, the Committee held ten live televised public hearings that presented evidence of Trump's seven-part plan to overturn the 2020 elections; this included live interviews under oath (of many Republicans and some Trump loyalists), as well as recorded sworn deposition testimony and video footage from other sources. An Executive Summary of the committee's findings was published on December 19, 2022; a Final Report was published on December 22, 2022.

During the first hearing on June 9, 2022, committee chair Bennie Thompson and vice-chair Liz Cheney said that President Donald Trump tried to stay in power even though he lost the 2020 presidential election. Thompson called it a "coup". The committee shared footage of the attack, discussed the involvement of the Proud Boys, and included testimony from a documentary filmmaker and a member of the Capitol Police.

The second hearing on June 13, 2022, focused on evidence showing that Trump knew he lost and that most of his inner circle knew claims of fraud did not have merit. William Barr testified that Trump had "become detached from reality" because he continued to promote conspiracy theories and pushed the stolen election myth without "interest in what the actual facts were."

The third hearing on June 16, 2022, examined how Trump and others pressured Vice President Mike Pence to selectively discount electoral votes and overturn the election by unconstitutional means, using John Eastman's fringe legal theories as justification.

The fourth hearing on June 21, 2022, included appearances by election officials from Arizona and Georgia who testified they were pressured to "find votes" for Trump and change results in their jurisdictions. The committee revealed attempts to organize fake slates of alternate electors and established that "Trump had a direct and personal role in this effort."

The fifth hearing on June 23, 2022, focused on Trump's pressure campaign on the Justice Department to rubber stamp his narrative of a stolen election, the insistence on numerous debunked election fraud conspiracy theories, requests to seize voting machines, and Trump's effort to install Jeffrey Clark as acting attorney general.

The exclusive witness of the sixth hearing on June 28, 2022, was Cassidy Hutchinson, top aide to former White House Chief of Staff Mark Meadows. She testified that White House officials anticipated violence days in advance of January 6; that Trump knew supporters at the Ellipse rally were armed with weapons including AR-15s yet asked to relax security checks at his speech; and that Trump planned to join the crowd at the Capitol and became irate when the Secret Service refused his request. Closing the hearing, Cheney presented evidence of witness tampering.

The seventh hearing on July 12, 2022, showed how Roger Stone and Michael Flynn connected Trump to domestic militias like the Oath Keepers and Proud Boys that helped coordinate the attack.

The eighth hearing on July 21, 2022, presented evidence and details of Trump's refusal to call off the attack on the Capitol, despite hours of pleas from officials and insiders. According to the New York Times, the committee delivered two significant public messages: Rep. Liz Cheney made the case that Trump could never "be trusted with any position of authority in our great nation again", while Rep. Bennie Thompson called for legal "accountability" and "stiff consequences" to "overcome the ongoing threat to our democracy."

The ninth hearing on October 13, 2022, presented video of Roger Stone and evidence that some Trump associates planned to claim victory in the 2020 election regardless of the official results. The committee voted unanimously to subpoena Trump for documents and testimony, and a subpoena was issued one week later. Trump refused to comply.

The tenth hearing on December 19, 2022, convened to present a final overview of their investigative work to date, and the committee recommended that former President Donald Trump, John Eastman, and others be referred for legal charges. The committee also recommended that the House Ethics Committee follow up on Rep. Kevin McCarthy (CA), Rep. Jim Jordan (OH), Scott Perry (PA), and Andy Biggs (AZ) refusing to answer subpoenas. The votes were unanimous. Immediately after the hearing, the committee released a 154-page executive summary of its findings.

=== Criminal referrals ===
On December 19, 2022, the committee criminally referred Trump to the DOJ for four suspected crimes.

- Obstruction of an Official Proceeding (18 U.S.C. § 1512(c))
- Conspiracy to Defraud the United States (18 U.S.C. § 371)
- Conspiracy to Make a False Statement (18 U.S.C. §§ 371, 1001)
- “Incite,” “Assist” or “Aid and Comfort” an Insurrection (18 U.S.C. § 2383)

Simultaneously, the committee referred John Eastman to the DOJ for the first two of those same crimes. This move was supported by a June 7, 2022, ruling by Judge David Carter. Carter had decided that one email in John Eastman's possession, sent before January 6, contained likely evidence of a crime and that Eastman must disclose it to the House committee under the crime-fraud exception of attorney-client privilege.

- Obstruction of an Official Proceeding (18 U.S.C. § 1512(c))
- Conspiracy to Defraud the United States (18 U.S.C. § 371)

The committee suggested that the DOJ look into two additional charges for Trump: conspiracy to prevent someone from holding office or performing the duties of their office, and seditious conspiracy. It noted that convictions on both of these charges had recently been delivered in the high-profile Oath Keepers trial.

- Other Conspiracy Statutes (18 U.S.C. §§ 372 and 2384)

Trump and Eastman were the only individuals the committee criminally referred to the DOJ. Although the committee said that Mark Meadows, Rudy Giuliani, Jeffrey Clark had been “actors” in the plot, it decided it lacked sufficient evidence to refer them, especially given certain individuals' unwillingness to cooperate with the investigation. "We trust that the Department of Justice will do its job", Raskin said.

==== Impact on other investigations ====
On August 1, 2023, a federal grand jury indicted Trump on four counts, three of which resemble the charges recommended by the House select committee. (Trump was not charged with incitement of insurrection.) Additionally, among the co-conspirators identified in the indictment were four who'd been previously named by the House committee: John Eastman, Rudy Giuliani, Jeffrey Clark, and Kenneth Chesebro. Trump pleaded not guilty to all charges. A trial was scheduled but never held. In January 2025, the special counsel resigned. The special counsel's 137-page final report, dated January 7, 2025, was publicly released. In a footnote, it mentions that the special counsel had made use of the House select committee's December 2022 report "as well as certain materials received from the Committee," though "those materials comprised a small part of the Office's investigative record" and the special counsel had verified all facts it used when deciding to prosecute the case. Through the court process of discovery, the special counsel's office gave Trump's team access to "all materials received from the Select Committee." Noting that Trump had attempted to equate the House select committee and the Justice Department's special counsel's office, the special counsel points out that the district court had rejected this allegation as Trump had provided no "adequate basis" for it.

Under the 14th Amendment to the U.S. Constitution, anyone who has "engaged" in insurrection is ineligible to hold public office, but it does not say how to prove this offense (e.g., if it bans only those who have been criminally convicted of insurrection) nor who deems a candidate ineligible to hold office and who enforces the ban. In early 2022, the eligibility of two candidates in North Carolina and Georgia was questioned, but ultimately not denied, on this basis. Later that year, a county commissioner from New Mexico became the first elected official since the Civil War era to be removed from office for participating in an insurrection. On December 15, 2022, House Democrats introduced a bill that would prevent Trump specifically from running for office again. In 2023, lawsuits were filed in several states, and on December 19, the Colorado Supreme Court ruled that Trump should be removed from the ballot in that state, based on the 14th Amendment. However, on March 4, 2024, the U.S. Supreme Court ruled that no states have the power to remove Trump from the ballot. The court decided that this power lies with Congress. Trump ran for the presidency and was elected in November 2024. Upon his inauguration in January 2025, he pardoned well over a thousand people who had been convicted of offenses related to the riot. Only 14 were not pardoned, and he let them out of prison anyway by commuting their sentences to "time served".

The select committee's work also aided the State of Georgia's investigation into alleged solicitations of election fraud. On May 2, 2022, Fulton County's District Attorney Fani Willis opened a special grand jury to consider criminal charges, and on August 14, 2023, a Georgia grand jury indicted Trump on 13 counts. The identities of Trump's 18 co-defendants and 30 unindicted co-conspirators significantly overlap with the people identified by the House committee. In particular, Chesebro was charged with seven felonies related to electoral vote obstruction, and he pleaded guilty to one of them: conspiracy to file false documents.

On July 18, 2023, Michigan indicted 16 people who signed fake documents. At least two, Kathy Berden and Mayra Rodriguez, had been interviewed by the select committee.

On December 5, 2023, Nevada indicted six people in the fake elector scheme. At least two, Michael J. McDonald and James DeGraffenreid, had been interviewed by the select committee.

On April 23, 2024, Arizona indicted eleven fake electors and seven Trump allies. The Trump allies were Christina Bobb, John Eastman, Jenna Ellis, Boris Epshteyn, Rudy Giuliani, Mark Meadows, and Mike Roman. The indictment also described five unindicted coconspirators, including Trump and Chesebro.

On June 4, 2024, Wisconsin indicted three people, including Chesebro.

=== Witness testimony transcripts ===
In late December 2022, anticipating that the new Congress to be seated in January would not allow it to continue its work, the committee released many of its witness testimony transcripts.

On December 21, the committee released the first batch. The transcripts detailed testimony from 34 witnesses who mostly invoked the Fifth Amendment and avoided answering questions, including:

- former acting Assistant Attorney General for the Civil Division Jeffrey Clark
- Trump campaign lawyer John Eastman
- conservative attorney Jenna Ellis
- former National Security Adviser Michael Flynn
- Trump ally Roger Stone
- Oath Keepers Founder Stewart Rhodes
- Proud Boys Chairman Enrique Tarrio
- conservative radio host Alex Jones
- Arizona Republican Party Chair Kelli Ward
- white nationalist Nick Fuentes

On December 22, more transcripts were released. They revealed that Cassidy Hutchinson had given additional testimony on September 14–15, 2022, in which she claimed that Trump allies, including her "Trump world" attorney Stefan Passantino, had pressured her not to talk to the committee. (Passantino would later sue the committee for $67 million in damages to his reputation. He was represented by Jesse Binall.)

On December 23, 46 more interview transcripts were released, including:

- Trump's daughter Ivanka
- former Attorney General Bill Barr
- former White House counsel Pat Cipollone
- former acting Attorney General Jeffrey Rosen
- former White House communications director Hope Hicks
- former press secretary Kayleigh McEnany
- Trump-backed attorney Sidney Powell
- Marc Short, chief of staff to Vice President Mike Pence

On December 30, the committee released more transcripts.

=== 2021 public hearings ===
The House select committee began its investigation with a preliminary public hearing on July 27, 2021, called "The Law Enforcement Experience on January 6th". Capitol and District of Columbia police testified, describing their personal experiences on the day of the attack, and graphic video footage was shown.

== Final report ==
Introductory Material to the Final Report

Final Report

On December 22, 2022, the final report was published online. The report was final because the committee itself expired two weeks later when the 117th Congress ended.

Several publishing houses printed it. An edition by Penguin Random House had a foreword by Schiff, one by Celadon Books had a preface by David Remnick and an epilogue by Raskin, and one by HarperCollins had an introduction by Ari Melber.

=== Before publication ===
In October 2022, Representative Zoe Lofgren said the committee would likely provide an unredacted version of its final report to the DOJ at the same time the public received a redacted version. In December, Representative Schiff said the committee would publish its evidence so the newly elected Republican-majority House of Representatives (soon to be sworn in for the 118th Congress) could not "cherry-pick certain evidence and mislead the country with some false narrative."

As the committee wrapped up its work in late 2022, the writers of the final report were directed to focus more on Trump's alleged crimes (as researched by the "Gold Team" and revealed in the public hearings) and less on law enforcement's failure to address radicalization, armed groups, and violent threats. Some committee staff expressed concerns that Vice Chair Liz Cheney wanted an anti-Trump report to bolster her own political future. Another person quoted by The Washington Post anonymously rebutted that notion, saying that Cheney was striving to produce a narrative more compelling than that of "the Mueller report, which nobody read". On November 27, 2022, Representative Schiff said the committee members hadn't yet reached consensus on the report's focus but also were "close to the putting down the pen".

Before the November 2022 midterm elections, the committee held public hearings but did not yet release any written report.

=== Summary ===
On December 19, 2022, the same day it made the criminal referrals, the committee published an "Executive Summary" as an introduction to its final report. It outlined 17 findings central to its reasoning for criminal referrals. Paraphrased, they are:

1. Trump lied about election fraud for the purpose of staying in power and asking for money.
2. Ignoring the rulings of over 60 federal and state courts, he plotted to overturn the election.
3. He pressured Pence to illegally refuse to certify the election.
4. He tried to corrupt and weaponize the Justice Department to keep himself in power.
5. He pressured state legislators and officials to give different election results.
6. He perpetrated the fake electors scheme.
7. He pressured members of Congress to object to real electors.
8. He approved federal court filings with fake information about voter fraud.
9. He summoned the mob and told them to march on the Capitol, knowing some were armed.
10. He tweeted negatively about Pence at 2:24 p.m. on January 6, 2021, inciting more violence.
11. He spent the afternoon watching television, despite his advisers’ pleas for him to stop the violence.
12. This was all part of a conspiracy to overturn the election.
13. Intelligence and law enforcement warned the Secret Service about Proud Boys and Oath Keepers.
14. The violence wasn't caused by left-wing groups.
15. Intelligence didn't know that Trump himself had plotted with John Eastman and Rudy Giuliani.
16. In advance of January 6, the Capitol Police didn't act on their police chief's suggestion to request backup from the National Guard.
17. On January 6, the Defense Secretary, not Trump, called the National Guard.

=== Full report ===
The report placed blame on "one man", former U.S. President Donald Trump, for inciting the riot. It provided detail about a robust, organized campaign to assemble and deliver a bogus slate of electors and named lesser known Trump lawyer Kenneth Chesebro as the plot's architect. According to the final report, Donald Trump "sought to corrupt the US Department of Justice" by pleading with department officials to make false statements regarding the presidential elections, had failed to deploy the DC National Guard during the attack despite having the authority to do so, and made "multiple efforts" to contact witnesses summoned to testify before the House Select Committee. The report accused Donald Trump of engaging in a criminal “multi-part conspiracy” to overturn the results of the 2020 election.

In the two months between the election and the Capitol attack, Trump allies engaged in “at least 200 apparent acts of public or private outreach, pressure, or condemnation” of state election officials. They had 68 communications with those officials (including meetings, phone calls, and texts), and they made 125 social media posts about those officials.

According to the committee's original authorization, it was supposed to terminate 30 days after filing its final report. The 118th Congress convened two weeks after the committee published the report, rendering the 30-day timeframe irrelevant.

== Timeline of proceedings ==
=== 2021 ===
==== July 2021 ====
- July 27: The committee held its first public hearing, featuring testimony from four police officers who were in the front line as rioters attacked the Capitol.
  - Daniel Hodges, a Metropolitan Police Department of the District of Columbia officer, said he was crushed in a doorway between rioters and a police line. (Note: The rioter who pinned him with a riot shield pled not guilty and was convicted a year later. "Ridgefield Man Found Guilty on Multiple Charges in Connection to Jan. 6 Riot", NBC Connecticut, September 13, 2022. Accessed December 19, 2022.)
  - Michael Fanone, a Metropolitan Police Department officer, said rioters pulled him into the crowd, beat him with a flagpole, stole his badge, repeatedly tased him with his taser and went for his gun. He criticized those who downplayed the attack.
  - Harry Dunn, a private first class of the U.S. Capitol Police, spoke about the racial abuse he and other officers experienced during the attack.
  - Aquilino Gonell, a U.S. Capitol Police sergeant, said he was beaten with a flagpole and chemically sprayed.

==== August 2021 ====
- August 23: Committee investigators reportedly planned to seek phone records of multiple people, including members of Congress.
- August 25: The committee sought records of at least 30 members of Trump's inner circle from seven government agencies and the National Archives and Records Administration (NARA), which preserves White House communication records. The committee's letter explained it was repeating requests that "multiple committees of the House of Representatives" had made on March 25, 2021. (Several weeks later, it was revealed that they specifically sought records from White House Chief of Staff Mark Meadows and some Republican members of Congress.)
- August 27: The committee demanded records from 15 social media companies going back to the spring of 2020.

==== September 2021 ====
The committee sought to identify whether the White House was involved in planning the Capitol attack and whether Trump personally had advance knowledge of it. The committee considered issuing subpoenas for call records or testimony of senior Trump administration officials including Meadows, Deputy Chief of Staff Dan Scavino and former Trump campaign manager Brad Parscale.

- September 23: The committee issued subpoenas to Meadows, Scavino, chief strategist Steve Bannon, and Pentagon official and former Devin Nunes aide Kash Patel. Documents were demanded by October 7. Bannon and Patel were instructed to testify on October 14, and Meadows and Scavino on October 15. Trump and his attorneys instructed the four aides (as was reported two weeks later) to defy the orders and provide neither documents nor testimony.
- September 29: Amy Kremer and ten others affiliated with her organization Women for America First, which held the permit for the Stop the Steal rally that preceded the Capitol attack, were subpoenaed by the committee. Among these eleven people was Katrina Pierson, national spokesperson for Trump's 2016 campaign.

==== October 2021 ====
- October 7: As the committee issued further subpoenas to Stop the Steal LLC, Stop the Steal campaign organizer Ali Alexander, and fellow rally organizer Nathan Martin, Trump announced he would assert executive privilege to withhold the documents the committee had requested in August.
- October 8:
  - White House Press Secretary Jen Psaki says Biden would not honor Trump's request to assert executive privilege to stop NARA from providing these documents. Nevertheless, Trump writes NARA asserting privilege over about forty documents. The same day, White House counsel Dana Remus advises NARA archivist David Ferriero that the challenged documents were to be released following a 30-day courtesy warning to Trump.
  - A lawyer for Bannon says in a letter to the committee that Bannon would not comply with the subpoena for his testimony, because Trump had asserted executive privilege and instructed him to defy the subpoena.
- October 13: The committee subpoenas Jeffrey Clark and schedules him to provide documents and testimony later in the month. As assistant attorney general, Clark angled for a promotion to attorney general by promising Trump he would help overturn the election results. Former acting attorney general Jeffrey Rosen, who resisted Clark's efforts to interfere with the election outcome, is interviewed by the committee.
- October 14: After Bannon does not appear for his scheduled deposition, the committee says it would initiate proceedings to hold Bannon in criminal contempt. The committee also announces that Patel and Meadows were "engaging" with their investigation, and postpones both their depositions scheduled for October 14 and 15 respectively. Scavino, meanwhile, also has his October 15 deposition postponed because the committee was unable to locate him, and he did not formally receive the subpoena until October 8.
- October 18: Trump sues to prevent NARA from turning over the records to the committee or at least to allow him "to conduct a full privilege review of all of the requested materials" so he can choose which records NARA provides. His lawsuit, submitted by attorney Jesse R. Binnall, complains that the records request is "illegal, unfounded, and overbroad" and amounts to a "fishing expedition". Meanwhile, NARA plans to release the documents on November 12.
- October 19: The committee votes unanimously to adopt a contempt of Congress report against Bannon and refer it to the full House for a vote.
- October 21: All 220 House Democrats and 9 House Republicans vote to hold Bannon in contempt of Congress, referring his case to the DOJ, which will decide whether to prosecute him.
- October 22: CNN reports that Cheney and Kinzinger have interviewed former Trump director of strategic communications Alyssa Farah. She had resigned in December 2020 and told CNN after the January 6 attack that Trump had lied to the American people about the election results.
- October 25: Biden once again says he would not assert executive privilege; this regarded a second batch of documents the committee had requested from NARA.
- October 26: The Washington Post reports that more people are expected to be subpoenaed, including legal scholar John Eastman, who supported Trump's claims about the 2020 election.
- October 29: Jeffrey Clark, having parted ways with his attorney several days previously, does not appear for his scheduled deposition.
- October 30: In a court filing, NARA details that Trump sought to block about 750 pages of documents among the nearly 1,600 requested by the committee, including hundreds of pages of statements and talking points by Trump press secretary Kayleigh McEnany; daily presidential diaries, schedules, and appointment information; White House visitor, activity, and phone logs from on and around January 6; drafts of speeches, remarks, and correspondence relating to the Capitol attack; and handwritten notes from chief of staff Mark Meadows.

==== November 2021 ====
- November 5: Jeffrey Clark and his new attorney meet with investigators to state Clark would not cooperate unless compelled by a court order, asserting that Trump's "confidences are not his to waive", citing attorney-client privilege. In a letter to the committee, Clark's attorney cites a letter from a Trump attorney specifically stating Trump would not try to block Clark's testimony.
- November 8: The committee subpoenaed Bill Stepien; Jason Miller; Michael Flynn; John Eastman; Angela McCallum; and Bernard Kerik, at least some of whom were suspected to have been connected to the "war room" operation at the Willard Hotel. All were required to provide documents by November 23 and scheduled to testify under oath through December.
- November 9:
  - The committee subpoenaed Kayleigh McEnany; Stephen Miller; Nick Luna; John McEntee; Ken Klukowski; Chris Liddell; Molly Michael; Cassidy Hutchinson; Benjamin Williamson; and Keith Kellogg. All were required to provide documents by November 23 and scheduled to testify under oath through December.
  - Federal judge Tanya Chutkan denies Trump's October 18 request to stop NARA from releasing documents. Trump's claim "that he may override the express will of the executive branch", she wrote in a 39-page ruling, "appears to be premised on the notion that his executive power 'exists in perpetuity'. But Presidents are not kings, and Plaintiff is not President." (The previous evening, Trump had filed an emergency request for a preemptive injunction against Chutkan's forthcoming decision, but Chutkan rejected it two hours later as legally defective and premature.) Trump immediately asks Chutkan for an injunction, which she denies. However, the DC Circuit Court of Appeals grants Trump's request for an injunction on November 11 and schedules oral arguments before a three-judge panel for November 30.
- November 12:
  - Meadows does not appear for his testimony.
  - Bannon is federally indicted on two counts of criminal contempt of Congress.
- November 15: Bannon surrenders to the FBI.
- November 22: Subpoenas are issued for InfoWars host Alex Jones and longtime Republican operative Roger Stone, as well as two Stop the Steal organizers, Dustin Stockton and Jennifer Lawrence, and Trump spokesman and Save America PAC communications director Taylor Budowich. Warrants for Proud Boys and Oath Keepers, and their respective leaders Enrique Tarrio and Stewart Rhodes, are issued the following day. Robert Patrick Lewis, chairman of 1st Amendment Praetorian, a group alleged to have provided security at several rallies before January 6, is also subpoenaed that day.
- November 24: In advance of the hearing scheduled for November 30 regarding the release of NARA records, Trump's attorneys submit a reply brief. They claim that Biden's willingness to release the records served his "own political advantage" and "will result in permanent damage to the institution of the presidency".
- November 30: Trump's lawyers asked the judges on the DC Circuit Court of Appeals to review each document and decide whether to release each one to Congress. The three judges denied this request. Judge Patricia Millett said the dispute was not about the content of these specific documents but rather the principle of "what happens when the current incumbent president" (in this case, Biden) says he will not interfere with an information exchange between NARA and Congress. (The court went on to rule against Trump on December 9; Trump went on to appeal to the Supreme Court on December 23; and the Supreme Court denied his request on January 19, 2022.)

==== December 2021 ====
- December 1:
  - The committee voted unanimously to hold Jeffrey Clark in contempt of Congress. Clark had said he planned to invoke the Fifth Amendment, which protects people from being forced to self-incriminate. (He was given a new deposition date of December 4, but due to his report of a "medical condition", the deposition was postponed; he eventually appeared on February 2, 2022, but did not answer substantive questions.)
  - A 36-page memorandum by Colonel Earl G. Matthews was sent to the committee contesting the findings of the DoD Inspector General report on the response to the riot. The memorandum accused two principal sources of the report of perjury in an attempted coverup of acting Army Secretary Ryan McCarthy's inaction during the riot.
- December 7: Mark Meadows's attorney said he would cease cooperating. Meadows had already provided 2,300 text messages, including those sent during the riot in which he informed others what Trump was doing, and some 6,800 pages of emails. Among the documents was a January 5 38-page PowerPoint presentation entitled "Election Fraud, Foreign Interference & Options for 6 JAN" to be provided "on the hill"; a November 6 text exchange with a member of Congress in which Meadows reportedly said "I love it" in a discussion about the fake electors scheme; and a November 7 email discussing that scheme as part of a "direct and collateral attack". Meadows objected to the committee's subpoena of telecom carriers for the call and text metadata of more than 100 people, including himself and others in Trump's inner circle. He sued Nancy Pelosi, the committee and its members to block his subpoena as well as the subpoena issued to Verizon for his phone records. NARA said it was working with Meadows' lawyers to obtain more documents from him.
- December 9:
  - A reporter for The Guardian, Hugo Lowell, tweeted slides from a PowerPoint presentation that recommended Trump declare a national security emergency to return himself to office and was reportedly referenced in emails Meadows turned over to the committee.
  - The three-judge panel of the DC Circuit Court of Appeals unanimously rejected Trump's appeal to have his White House records withheld from the committee. However, NARA was not permitted to deliver the records to Congress for another two weeks to allow Trump sufficient time to appeal to the U.S. Supreme Court.
- December 10: The Guardian reported that Meadows had turned over a 38-page PowerPoint presentation entitled "Election Fraud, Foreign Interference & Options for 6 JAN" to the committee as well as the email referring to the presentation. It recommended that Trump declare a national security emergency to delay the January 6 certification of electors, reject all ballots cast by machine, and have paper ballots secured by U.S. marshals and National Guard troops to conduct a recount. (The newspaper also saw a 36-page version that was not substantially different.) Meadows's attorney said the PowerPoint presentation had arrived in Meadows's email inbox and that Meadows did not act on it. This presentation (as was reported the next day) detailed an elaborate theory that China and Venezuela had taken control of voting machines, and it had been distributed by Phil Waldron, a retired Army colonel who specialized in psychological operations during his career. Waldron said he had spoken to Meadows "maybe eight to 10 times", had attended a November 25 Oval Office meeting with Trump and others, and had briefed several members of Congress on the presentation. Waldron was a Trump campaign associate who made false assertions of election fraud as an expert witness during hearings alongside Rudy Giuliani in Arizona, Georgia, and Michigan.
- December 12: The committee released a report revealing that Meadows had sent an email on January 5 promising that the National Guard would "protect pro Trump people". The report also included what the committee said were an email and text messages to members of Congress discussing how Trump might persuade legislators of some states to change their certified elector slates from Biden to Trump, writing Trump "thinks the legislators have the power, but the VP has power too". Meadows asked the members how Trump could contact such legislators, which the president did via a conference call with 300 of them on January 2, providing them purported evidence of fraud they might use to decertify their election results. Three days later, dozens of legislators from Arizona, Georgia, Michigan, Pennsylvania and Wisconsin wrote Pence asking him to postpone the January 6 certification of electors for ten days "affording our respective bodies to meet, investigate, and as a body vote on certification or decertification of the election".
- December 13: Before the committee voted unanimously to recommend a contempt of Congress charge against Meadows to the full House, Cheney read aloud some text messages Meadows received on and around January 6 that revealed the perspectives of Trump allies at that time. Cheney suggested that Trump may have committed a felony by corruptly obstructing the electoral certification proceedings.
- December 14: The House voted 222–208 to find Meadows in criminal contempt of Congress and to refer the matter to the Justice Department. The only two Republicans to join Democrats in the vote against Meadows were Liz Cheney and Adam Kinzinger, both of whom serve on the committee. Prior to the vote, more text messages to Meadows were presented on the House floor, including one sent on the day after the election that proposed a strategy to send electors selected by Republican-controlled legislatures in three states directly to the Supreme Court before voting results had been determined in those states. CNN later reported that the committee believed the text came from Rick Perry, the former Texas governor and secretary of energy during the Trump administration. Though a Perry spokesman denied Perry sent the text, CNN had evidence that it came from Perry's phone. Committee member Jamie Raskin acknowledged that the text's author had been initially misidentified as a lawmaker.
- December 16: The White House counsel's office agreed in writing to delay their pursuit of NARA's release of some documents. Although Biden rejected Trump's claim of executive privilege, the White House nevertheless had its own concerns about the records request and said it should be narrowed so as not to expose highly classified or irrelevant information. The committee on December 16 also moved to subpoena Waldron, the purported author of the PowerPoint presentation turned over by Meadows.
- December 17: Roger Stone appeared before the committee for less than an hour and asserted his Fifth Amendment rights to refuse to answer questions. Through his legal team, he claimed he was avoiding the "elaborate trap" of the committee's "loaded questions".
- December 20: Committee chair Thompson wrote to Representative Scott Perry asking him to provide information about his involvement in the effort to install Jeffrey Clark as acting attorney general. Thompson believed Perry had been involved in the effort to install Clark, given witness testimony from former acting attorney general Jeffrey Rosen and his deputy Richard Donoghue, as well as communications between Perry and Meadows. Perry declined the request the next day. Among the text messages to Meadows the committee released on December 14 was one attributed to a "member of Congress" dated January 5 that read "Please check your signal", a reference to the encrypted messaging system Signal. In his letter to Perry, Thompson mentioned evidence that Perry had communicated with Meadows using Signal, though Perry denied sending that particular message.
- December 22: Thompson wrote a letter to congressman Jim Jordan requesting a meeting to discuss his communications with Trump and possibly his associates on and around January 6.
- December 23:
  - The Washington Post reported that the committee was considering a recommendation to the Department of Justice of opening a possible criminal investigation into Trump for his activities on January 6.
  - Trump appealed to the Supreme Court to block NARA from releasing documents to the committee, which Trump's lawyers claimed would cause him "irreparable harm". Later that day, the committee asked the court to prioritize its decision on whether it would hear Trump's case. (The court would eventually reject Trump's emergency request a month later, which allowed the committee to receive the records, and it would also decline to hear his case a month after that.)
- December 24: While suing to block a subpoena of his bank records from JP Morgan, current Trump spokesman Taylor Budowich said in a court filing that he had cooperated extensively with the committee by providing 1,700 pages of documents and about four hours of sworn testimony relating to the planning and financing of Trump's speech outside the White House on January 6. The subpoena of JP Morgan had not been public knowledge until Budowich's lawsuit revealed it. It is the first time this committee has been known to subpoena a bank directly.
- December 27: Thompson told The Guardian that the committee would investigate a call Trump made to his associates at the Willard Hotel on the night before the January 6 attack. (Note: The Guardian had reported the call on November 30.)
- December 29: Trump's attorney complained to the Supreme Court that, if the committee's work had any "legislative purpose", it was merely a pretext for "what is essentially a law enforcement investigation". This would invalidate the investigation, according to Trump's lawyers, since the congressional mandate requires a legislative purpose. Trump's attorney cited Thompson's recent acknowledgment that the committee could make a criminal referral.
- December 31: Bernard Kerik provided documents to the committee. He did not provide what he considered to be attorney work product documents; he described these in a "privilege log". One was described as a draft letter from Trump that cited national security reasons to seize election-related evidence. It was dated December 17, the day before Trump, Flynn, Giuliani and others met in the Oval Office to discuss options including seizing voting machines. Another document detailed a sweeping nationwide communications plan to persuade Republican representatives at the state and federal level "to disregard the fraudulent vote count and certify the duly-elected President Trump."

=== 2022 ===
==== January 2022 ====
- January 5: Former Trump White House aide Stephanie Grisham testified to the committee. She reportedly said that Trump held secret meetings in the White House residence in the weeks before the Capitol attack and that the Secret Service had received a presidential document reflecting Trump's intentions to march to the Capitol on January 6.
- January 8: The Guardian reported the committee was examining whether Trump had overseen a criminal conspiracy that connected efforts to block Biden's election certification with the Capitol attack.
- January 9: Representative Jim Jordan declined the committee's December 22 request for an interview.
- January 10: An article in Politico drew renewed attention to the fake electors scheme in which unauthorized individuals had forged certificates of ascertainment claiming that Trump won their state's electoral votes. These unauthorized individuals had sent the false documents to NARA; NARA had rejected them. The committee was reportedly interviewing state officials, especially in Arizona, Georgia, Michigan and Pennsylvania, to retrace Trump's efforts to subvert the election at the state level.
- January 12:
  - The committee asked Republican House minority leader Kevin McCarthy to voluntarily provide information. In a letter to McCarthy, the committee summarized its knowledge of McCarthy's positions and actions, and it asked McCarthy if he'd discussed his own shifts in tone with Trump or his aides, especially considering any investigations. McCarthy said hours later he would not cooperate.
  - CNN reported the committee was investigating fraudulent certificates of ascertainment created by Trump allies in seven states in late December 2020. The documents had been published by the watchdog group American Oversight in March 2021 but received little attention until January 2022. Michigan attorney general Dana Nessel announced on January 14 that after a months-long investigation she had asked the U.S. Justice Department to open a criminal investigation. Deputy attorney general Lisa Monaco confirmed several days later that the department was reviewing the matter.
- January 19: The Supreme Court ruled that NARA could release the Trump White House documents to the committee. It did not provide a reason, stating simply that it "denied" Trump's request. However, it did make a comment: As the Court of Appeals had acknowledged it would have denied Trump's request even had he still been in office, anything the Court of Appeals said about "Trump's status as a former President" was legally "nonbinding". The votes of the justices were not disclosed, except for the dissent of Justice Clarence Thomas. (Thomas's wife, Ginni Thomas, had attended the January 6 rally, which was not reported until two months after the Supreme Court's decision.)
- January 20:
  - The committee asked Ivanka Trump for a voluntary interview. (She was interviewed, ultimately, on April 5.)
  - John Eastman sued the committee. The case is Eastman v. Thompson in the Southern Division of the United States District Court for the Central District of California.
  - In the evening, the committee received the documents from NARA that they had been seeking since August.
- January 23: Thompson disclosed the committee had been talking with former U.S. attorney general William Barr, as well as some Pentagon officials. (Months later, it was further clarified that the committee's Vice Chair, Liz Cheney, had spoken to Barr informally, at his home, for two hours in the fall of 2021.) Barr had been a staunch ally of Trump until his December 1, 2020, announcement that the Justice Department had not found evidence of significant election irregularities. Trump was angered by the finding and announced Barr's resignation on Twitter two weeks later.
- January 24:
  - In an effort to withhold 19,000 emails subpoenaed by the committee, an attorney for John Eastman told a federal judge that they were protected by attorney-client privilege because Eastman had been representing Trump while participating in the January 2 conference call with legislators; the January 3 Oval Office meeting with Trump and Pence; and while working at the Willard Hotel. Eastman had not previously asserted privilege. The emails were stored on servers at Eastman's former employer, Chapman University, which had been subpoenaed and did not object to their release. The judge ordered the emails released to Eastman's legal team to identify which they asserted were privileged, before allowing a third party to scrutinize them.
  - The committee subpoenaed the telephone records of Arizona Republican Party chair Kelli Ward and her husband, Michael Ward. Both Wards were "alternate electors" who signed the false Arizona certificate of ascertainment. Kelli Ward was among the most prominent of Republican officials who worked with Trump to stoke claims of election fraud and later was involved in sending the false certificates to Congress.
- January 26: Marc Short, who had been Pence's chief of staff, was interviewed by the committee. They asked him about a conversation on January 5, 2021, in which he predicted that Trump would very soon publicly turn against Pence, likely posing a security risk to Pence. Short had spoken to Pence's lead Secret Service agent on that day to advise him of the risk.
- January 28:
  - The committee subpoenaed fourteen Republicans in seven states who falsely asserted they were the chairperson and secretary on slates of Trump electors presented on bogus certificates of ascertainment.
  - Former Trump deputy press secretary Judd Deere was subpoenaed. The committee stated in a letter to Deere that he had helped with "formulating White House's response to the January 6 attack as it occurred" and it wanted to discuss a January 5 Oval Office staff meeting he attended with Trump.
- January 31: The New York Times reported there were two executive orders drafted in mid-December to allow Trump to order the seizure of voting machines, predicated on baseless allegations of foreign tampering advanced by Waldron, Flynn and Powell. One document ordered the Defense Department to seize the machines, while the other called for the Department of Homeland Security to conduct the seizures. Giuliani persuaded Trump to avoid the former, but at Trump's direction he asked Ken Cuccinelli, the second in command at DHS, if seizures were possible; Cuccinelli responded DHS did not have the authority. Trump had also suggested to attorney general Bill Barr in November that the Justice Department could conduct the seizures, which Barr quickly said the department would not do. The Times reported the next day that the committee was scrutinizing Trump's involvement.

==== February 2022 ====
- February 1:
  - NARA notified Trump that it planned to deliver some of Pence's records to the committee on March 3.
  - Kelli and Michael Ward filed suit to preclude their telephone carrier from releasing the records on February 4, asserting that as practicing physicians their confidential communications with patients would be compromised.
- February 9: The committee subpoenaed Peter Navarro, a top Trump trade and manufacturing policy advisor, who had publicly said after the election that he worked with Steve Bannon and other Trump allies in an "operation" to delay the final certification of the election results in an effort to change the outcome.
- February 15: Biden rejected Trump's claim of executive privilege over the White House visitor logs for dates including January 6, 2021. NARA had provided these visitor logs to the Biden White House for review. The day after Biden's approval, NARA notified Trump that they would deliver the visitor logs to the committee on March 3.
- February 22: The Supreme Court declined to hear Trump's challenge to the release of the NARA records. The records had already been delivered to the committee on January 20 after the court denied Trump's emergency request. The Supreme Court was now saying it would not hear Trump's case at all. It did not disclose its reasoning or decision process.
- February 24: Politico reported a woman who was awaiting sentencing for breaching the Capitol asserted she also had extensive ties with the Pennsylvania Republican party, and had testified to committee investigators four times since October 2021. She said she had attended events "surrounded by Congressman, Senators, even Trump advisers" and was "promised future benefits, including a possible White House job." She also stated a "Trump adviser" asked her to help solicit affidavits alleging election fraud. She was the first indicted person to publicly disclose that her involvement extended beyond the attack and into the Republican establishment.
- February 25: Kimberly Guilfoyle, Donald Trump Jr.'s then-fiancée, appeared for a voluntary interview but abruptly left her video deposition when she realized committee members were present. Her lawyer subsequently complained that someone had leaked the news of the interview to the press.

==== March 2022 ====
- March 1: The committee subpoenaed six attorneys involved in Trump's efforts to overturn the election, including by filing lawsuits, pressuring local election officials to change the results and drafting proposed executive orders to seize voting machines.
- March 2:
  Document 160 from the John C. Eastman v. Bennie G. Thompson et al. case
  The committee stated in a federal court filing for Eastman v. Thompson that the evidence it had acquired "provides, at minimum, a good-faith basis for concluding" Trump and his campaign violated multiple laws in a criminal conspiracy to defraud the United States by attempting to prevent Congress from certifying his defeat. The filing in the District Court for the Central District of California challenged Eastman's court efforts to shield his emails from the committee, as he asserted attorney-client privilege. It contained a January 6, 2021, email exchange in which Pence's chief counsel Greg Jacob rebuked Eastman for proposing that Pence stop the vote certification. Jacob said that, "as a legal framework, it is a results-oriented position that you would never support if attempted by the opposition, and essentially entirely made up."
- March 3: Kimberly Guilfoyle was subpoenaed. The committee believed she was active in fundraising for the rallies preceding the attack and was in the Oval Office that day.
- March 4: Rudy Giuliani's attorneys suggested that he may not comply with his subpoena, given the committee's treatment of Eastman. Giuliani has asserted attorney-client privilege, the type of privilege that the committee asked a judge on March 2 to waive for Eastman.
- March 9:
  - The RNC sued to block the committee's subpoena of customer relationship management software company Salesforce. Through the subpoena, the committee had sought information about Republican National Committee fundraising. (The RNC lost the lawsuit on May 1.)
  - A federal judge said he would review 111 of John Eastman's emails from January 4–7, 2021 to determine whether they are protected by attorney-client or attorney work-product privilege.
- March 28:
  Document 260: 28 March 2022 Order of Judge David O. Carter from the John C. Eastman v. Bennie G. Thompson et al. case
  - The committee voted unanimously to hold Dan Scavino and Peter Navarro in contempt for refusing to testify. The next step would be for the full House to vote.
  - Judge David O. Carter reviewed Eastman's emails and said "the illegality of the plan was obvious" and ordered 101 emails to be turned over to the committee. Although neither Eastman nor Trump had been charged with a crime, the judge also wrote: "Based on the evidence, the Court finds that it is more likely than not that President Trump and Dr. Eastman dishonestly conspired to obstruct the Joint Session of Congress on January 6, 2021." Carter also wrote, referring to Kenneth Chesebro's December 13, 2020, email to Rudy Giuliani and others: "President Trump's team transformed a legal interpretation of the Electoral Count Act into a day-by-day plan of action. The draft memo pushed a strategy that knowingly violated the Electoral Count Act". Chesebro's email was later found to have included a proposal for Pence to recuse himself; Chesebro argued that vice presidents have a conflict of interest if they have just run for reelection, and he suggested that instead Chuck Grassley or another senior senate Republican should certify the election results. In this strategy, when the senator opened the Arizona envelopes and found two conflicting elector slates, he would halt the certification and suggest possible remedies such as allowing the Republican-controlled state legislature to appoint electors. Grassley told Roll Call on January 5 that "We don't expect [Pence] to be there", though Grassley's office quickly walked back the statement and said neither he nor his staff had been aware of the proposal.
- March 29: Committee chair Thompson called it "concerning" that no record of phone calls made by President Trump from 11:17 a.m. to 6:54 p.m. on January 6 had been found in eleven pages of records turned over to the committee. The committee was investigating whether it had received the complete phone log and whether Trump had used other phones.
- March 31: Jared Kushner voluntarily spoke to the committee for six hours. He was the first Trump family member to be interviewed.

==== April 2022 ====
- April 5: Ivanka Trump voluntarily spoke to the committee for eight hours.
- April 8:
  - The Guardian reported the committee had found evidence the Capitol attack included a coordinated assault by the Proud Boys and Oath Keepers, as well as possible coordination with Save America rally organizers.
  - CNN reported that documents the committee obtained included a text message Donald Trump Jr. sent to Meadows two days after the election. The text outlined paths to subvert the Electoral College process and ensure his father a second term. Trump Jr. wrote, "It's very simple. We have multiple paths. We control them all. We have operational control. Total leverage. Moral high ground. POTUS must start second term now." He continued, "Republicans control 28 states Democrats 22 states. Once again Trump wins", adding, "We either have a vote WE control and WE win OR it gets kicked to Congress 6 January 2021." Biden had not yet been declared the winner at the time of the text.
- April 10: The New York Times reported that committee members were divided on whether to make a criminal referral to the DOJ, though they agreed they had sufficient evidence. Vice chair Liz Cheney said there had been "a massive and well-organized and well-planned effort that used multiple tools to try to overturn an election" and that it was "absolutely clear" that Trump and his allies "knew it was unlawful".
- April 13:
  - Former White House counsel Pat A. Cipollone and his deputy Patrick F. Philbin met with the committee after Trump gave them permission.
  - NARA archivist David S. Ferriero gave Trump advance notice that he planned to turn over more documents to the committee on April 28.
- April 15: CNN published text messages the committee had obtained from Mark Meadows, focused on his communications with Senator Mike Lee and Representative Chip Roy, both of whom had backed off their initial support of Trump's efforts to challenge the election. Lee had grown disillusioned with Sidney Powell's wild claims, and when no state legislatures convened to pursue Eastman's fake electors scheme, Lee had voted to approve the official electoral results. He then criticized senators Ted Cruz and Josh Hawley for their continued election denial.
- April 18: A court filing by Eastman indicated that he was still trying to withhold 37,000 pages of emails. Federal judge David Carter will again consider his request.
- April 20: The Justice Department wrote to the committee with a broad request for transcripts of witness interviews "and of any additional interviews you conduct in the future", acknowledging that they could be used "as evidence in potential criminal cases, to pursue new leads or as a baseline for new interviews conducted by federal law enforcement officials". Kenneth Polite, assistant attorney general for the criminal division, and Matthew Graves, the U.S. attorney for the District of Columbia, wrote the committee's lead investigator Timothy Heaphy, advising him that the transcripts "may contain information relevant to a criminal investigation we are conducting".

==== May 2022 ====
- May 1: U.S. District Judge Timothy J. Kelly rejected the RNC's attempt to protect its Salesforce fundraising data from being released to the committee. The committee had claimed that the RNC and the Trump campaign had sent emails through Salesforce to spread claims of election fraud which in turn "motivated" the attack on the Capitol. Acknowledging the committee's position, the judge ruled that the committee has the constitutional right to seek information through a subpoena, and he rejected the RNC's argument that the First Amendment shields its information.
- May 2: The committee requested voluntary interviews with Representatives Mo Brooks of Alabama, Andy Biggs of Arizona, and Ronny Jackson of Texas. All three declined.
- May 6: Rudy Giuliani, scheduled to testify on this day, backed out after requesting and being denied the right to record his testimony.
- May 12: The committee issued subpoenas to House Republican leader Kevin McCarthy and Republican congressmen Jim Jordan, Mo Brooks, Scott Perry and Andy Biggs. The subpoenaing of House members by a committee had no modern precedent, apart from those of the House Ethics Committee. Unlike other subpoenas issued by the committee, the scope and contents of these were not disclosed, including whether documents or communications records were demanded.
- May 17: The New York Times reported the committee was negotiating with the Justice Department to exchange the witness interview transcripts for information the DOJ has. This was also the first news report about the April 20 request.
- May 19:
  - The committee asked Republican congressman Barry Loudermilk to voluntarily meet with investigators, writing, "we believe you have information regarding a tour you led through parts of the Capitol complex" the day before the attack, adding that "reporting and witness accounts indicate some individuals and groups engaged in efforts to gather information about the layout of the U.S. Capitol, as well as the House and Senate office buildings, in advance of January 6, 2021." (The committee later publicly identified the man who photographed hallways and staircases in the Capitol complex as Trevor Hallgren, who had traveled to Washington with Danny Hamilton. On January 6, Hamilton carried a flag with a sharpened tip that he suggested was a weapon intended for a specific target, while Hallgren named Democratic politicians and said: "We’re coming for you ... We’re coming to take you out.") In Loudermilk's same-day reply, he said he gave a tour to a family with young children. He denied that it was "a suspicious group or 'reconnaissance tour'", and he did not indicate whether he intended to cooperate with the committee.
  - Former attorney general Bill Barr was reportedly in active negotiations to provide sworn testimony and formal transcribed testimony.
  - John Eastman revealed that he sometimes spoke directly with Trump about a strategy to overturn the election but also had six intermediaries who could reach Trump for him. In a court filing, Eastman sought to block the committee from receiving two of Trump's handwritten notes, communications from seven state legislators, a document discussing possible "scenarios for Jan. 6", and a document discussing possible election-related lawsuits.
- May 20: Giuliani spoke with the committee for more than nine hours.

==== June 2022 ====
- June 2: Bill Barr gave in-person testimony behind closed doors for two hours.
- June 3: The FBI arrested Peter Navarro, who had been indicted by a grand jury the previous day for contempt of Congress. Chairman Thompson and Vice Chair Cheney said it was "puzzling" that the DOJ had decided not to prosecute Mark Meadows and Dan Scavino, both of whom Congress had also held in contempt months earlier.
- June 7: Judge David Carter ruled that Eastman must disclose an additional 159 sensitive documents to the committee. Ten documents related to three December 2020 meetings by a secretive group, including someone whom Carter characterized as a "high-profile" leader, strategizing about how to overturn the election. Carter decided that one email in particular contained likely evidence of a crime, and he ordered it disclosed under the crime-fraud exception of attorney-client privilege. It contained a warning by an unidentified attorney that the Trump legal team should not go to court over the upcoming Congressional session to certify the Electoral College vote count, since litigating might "tank the January 6 strategy".
- June 9: First public hearing. New footage of the attack was shown, and the first witnesses testified publicly. It was revealed that Representative Scott Perry had requested a pardon at the end of the Trump administration.
- June 12: Committee members Adam Schiff and Jamie Raskin told reporters there was enough evidence to recommend that the Justice Department indict President Donald Trump.
- June 13: Second public hearing. The committee presented testimony that Trump knew he lost the 2020 election yet promoted the false narrative to exploit donors, raking in "half a billion" dollars.
- June 15:
  - The committee released video of Representative Barry Loudermilk leading 15 people through the Capitol complex on January 5, 2021, the day before the insurrection. One unnamed man was seen photographing Capitol passageways such as staircases. In a separate video taken the next day during the insurrection, the same man stood outside the Capitol building and screamed threats about Speaker of the House Nancy Pelosi and others. On May 19, when the committee had requested a voluntary interview with Loudermilk about the matter, he wrote a statement claiming he had given a tour to "a constituent family with young children" on January 5 who "did not enter the Capitol grounds on the 6th". On June 15, Loudermilk again denied responsibility, but this time he omitted the denial of their presence at the Capitol on January 6. He also complained—despite continuing to refuse the committee's request for an interview—that the committee had not spoken to him directly about his activities.
  - The New York Times reported on an email exchange dated December 24, 2020, that the committee had obtained, between Eastman, attorney Kenneth Chesebro and Trump campaign officials. Eastman wrote he was aware of a "heated fight" within the Supreme Court about whether to hear a case, and participants in the email exchange discussed whether to file a Wisconsin case that four justices would agree to bring before the full court. Eastman wrote: "The odds are not based on the legal merits but an assessment of the justices' spines." Chesebro responded that the "odds of action before Jan. 6 will become more favorable if the justices start to fear that there will be 'wild' chaos on Jan. 6 unless they rule by then, either way". Chesebro, a New York appellate attorney, had 11 days earlier emailed Rudy Giuliani with a proposal for Pence to recuse himself from the January 6 certification so a senior Republican senator could count fraudulent elector slates to declare Trump the victor.
- June 16:
  - Third public hearing.
  - Having recently acquired Ginni Thomas's emails with Eastman, Thompson and Cheney reversed a previous decision and asked her for an interview.
- June 17: After receiving another letter from the Justice Department, now characterizing transcripts of witness interviews as "critical" to its investigations, the committee said it was "engaged in a cooperative process to address" the DOJ's needs. Like the April 20 letter, this letter was signed by Matthew Graves and Kenneth Polite, with the addition of Matthew Olsen, the Assistant Attorney General for the National Security Division.
- June 21:
  - Fourth public hearing.
  - Politico reported the committee had subpoenaed documentary filmmaker Alex Holder the previous week. Holder had been granted extensive access to Trump and his inner circle and had filmed interviews with Trump before and after January 6. The existence of the footage had not been previously reported. The resultant documentary miniseries, Unprecedented, was released two weeks later.
- June 23: Fifth public hearing. Former DOJ officials during the Trump administration testified live about how Trump tried to enlist the DOJ to overturn the 2020 presidential election. Videotaped testimony revealed that Representatives Mo Brooks, Andy Biggs, and Louie Gohmert asked for pardons at the end of the Trump administration. Representative Marjorie Taylor Greene may also have asked for a pardon, according to a former aide to White House chief of staff Mark Meadows. It had been reported two months earlier that GOP Representative Matt Gaetz had asked for a blanket pardon; his pardon request was also discussed at the hearing.
- June 28: Sixth public hearing.

==== July 2022 ====
- July 8:
  - Pat Cipollone, former White House counsel, testified for eight hours. He had already given a closed-door interview on April 13 and had been subpoenaed on June 29. Representative Zoe Lofgren said his testimony was consistent with that of other witnesses and that he spoke about Trump's "dereliction of duty". Testimony was closed-door and videotaped. In response to some questions, he asserted executive privilege.
  - Stewart Rhodes, leader of the Oath Keepers, offered – from jail – to testify to the committee, under the conditions that his testimony is presented without editing before an open forum, somewhere other than jail.
- July 9: Trump wrote to Steve Bannon, who was anticipating imminent trial for his federal indictment for refusing to comply with his subpoena. Trump said he would "waive Executive Privilege for you, which allows you to go in and testify truthfully and fairly", as long as Bannon could agree with the committee on when and where he would testify. Bannon's lawyer immediately wrote to the committee, asking "to testify at your public hearing" rather than in a closed-door deposition that would last hours. (The committee did not entertain the idea.)
- July 11: A judge ruled that Steve Bannon's lawyers cannot argue that the committee's subpoena violated House rules nor that Trump ordered him to defy the subpoena.
- July 12: Seventh public hearing. Representative Liz Cheney revealed that Donald Trump had called one of the committee's witnesses. That person did not answer Trump's call. The witness was said to be someone who had not yet testified publicly. The person was later further identified (but not named) as a White House support staffer who did not routinely speak to Trump and who had been speaking to the committee. The phone call had happened sometime within the previous two weeks, following Cassidy Hutchinson's public testimony.
- July 15:
  - The committee subpoenaed the U.S. Secret Service for text messages from January 5–6, 2021, that its agents deleted.
  - Patrick Byrne, former CEO of Overstock, testified behind closed doors.
- July 18: Jury selection began in Steve Bannon's trial.
- July 19:
  - The Secret Service said it could not recover the text messages. The National Archives called for an investigation.
  - Garrett Ziegler, a Trump White House aide to Peter Navarro, spoke to the committee. Afterward, he livestreamed himself calling the investigation a "Bolshevistic anti-White campaign...[that] see[s] me as a young Christian who they can try to basically scare" and insulting Cassidy Hutchinson and Alyssa Farah Griffin, two Trump administration officials who have cooperated with the committee.
- July 20: The Department of Homeland Security's Inspector General informed the Secret Service that it was opening a criminal probe into the missing text messages. This probe is separate from the House committee's subpoena. It was revealed that DHS had already known that the Secret Service had deleted its text messages.
- July 21: Eighth public hearing.
- July 22: Steve Bannon was convicted of two counts of contempt of Congress for his refusal to testify and produce documents. He will be sentenced on October 21.
- July 24: Committee Vice Chair Representative Liz Cheney said the committee would consider subpoenaing Ginni Thomas. They had already asked her on June 16 to meet with them voluntarily.
- July 26: Chairman Thompson, in his capacity as Chair of the House Homeland Security Committee and Chairwoman Maloney of the House Oversight & Reform Committee sent a joint-letter to DHS IG and Allison C. Lerner, Chair of Council of the Inspectors General on Integrity and Efficiency to have Cuffari step aside from the investigation into the missing Secret Service text messages and have the CIGIE appoint another Inspector General to conduct the investigation.
- July 28:
  - It was reported that the committee had already interviewed Trump's former Treasury Secretary Steven Mnuchin – as well as other former Cabinet officials, including Labor Secretary Eugene Scalia, Acting Defense Secretary Chris Miller and Acting Attorney General Jeff Rosen – and was likely to interview former Director of National Intelligence John Ratcliffe.
  - Former acting White House chief of staff Mick Mulvaney spoke to the committee for about two and a half hours. He said he was asked about his involvement in the Trump campaign, his conversations around Election Day, and his messages on January 6.

==== August 2022 ====
- August 1: Chairman Thompson repeated his July 26 request, asking DHS IG Cuffari to "step aside". He demanded documents and interviews, citing evidence that Cuffari's staff, at the direction of Deputy Inspector General Thomas Kait, may no longer be trying to obtain the Secret Service messages.
- August 8: The committee received Alex Jones's text messages. Jones's defense attorneys in the Heslin v. Jones defamation lawsuit by Sandy Hook parents had mistakenly given this telephone data to Mark Bankston, a plaintiff attorney, who then passed the data on to the committee. Bankston informed Judge Maya Guerra Gamble that the House committee had requested the text messages.
- August 9: Mike Pompeo, former Secretary of State, met with the committee. According to Representative Zoe Lofgren, he "answer[ed] questions for quite some time".
- August 12: It was reported that the committee had recently spoken to Elaine Chao, Trump's Secretary of Transportation.
- August 23:
  - Robert O'Brien, Trump's national security adviser, testified.
  - Politico reports that aides to the committee had traveled to Copenhagen the previous week to view extensive documentary footage about Roger Stone. The documentary, A Storm Foretold, had been filmed by a crew led by Christoffer Guldbrandsen. In June, Guldbrandsen had refused that FBI could access the footage directly, requiring a court order.
- August 30: Tony Ornato retired as the assistant director of the Office of Training at the Secret Service. Hours later, Ornato told NBC News he would cooperate with the investigations of the select committee and of the Department of Homeland Security. He had already testified to the select committee in March.

==== September 2022 ====
- September 1: The select committee requested that Newt Gingrich voluntarily appear for an interview about his communications with Trump's senior aides before and after the attack as well as his television ads pushing the big lie.
- September 2: The select committee withdrew its subpoena against the Republican National Committee and Salesforce.
- September 11:
  - In an interview on the progressive podcast No Lie with Brian Tyler Cohen, Representative Raskin stated that the select committee had been "taken totally by surprise by this new scandal" of the FBI search of Mar-a-Lago (an event over which the select committee had no jurisdiction). He also noted that the select committee's hearings could pertain to the missing text messages from the Secret Service as well as the Department of Defense.
- September 12:
  - The committee had reportedly been discussing the prioritization of investigative threads including:
1. Requesting testimony from Mike Pence and Donald Trump.
2. Whether to subpoena other high-profile individuals, including Virginia "Ginni" Thomas, the wife of Supreme Court Justice Clarence Thomas.
3. Referring the former president to the Department of Justice (which is expanding its own criminal probe into January 6).
4. Taking action against the five Republican lawmakers in the House of Representatives who refused to cooperate with subpoenas: Kevin McCarthy (House Minority Leader), Jim Jordan, Mo Brooks, Andy Biggs, and Scott Perry.
5. Inquiring into the U.S. Secret Service, including the deletion of text messages, as well as allegations that former Secret Service agent Tony Ornato was personally involved in efforts to discredit the testimony of Trump White House aide Cassidy Hutchinson.
- September 13: Chairman Thompson told reporters that the Select Committee planned another public hearing for September 28 (though this was ultimately postponed due to a hurricane). He also said they planned to release an interim report in mid-October (which did not happen).
- September 14:
  - Chairman Thompson said the Secret Service had produced "thousands of exhibits", including text messages and "radio traffic", following the committee's July 15 subpoena. Representative Lofgren said the committee "really pressed hard for the agency to release" the material.
  - In a court filing, the committee asked a federal judge in California for another 3,200 pages of emails from John Eastman. Additionally, House Counsel Douglas Letter asked the judge to review the remaining batch of emails and decide whether Eastman's claims of executive privilege are valid.
- September 15:
  - The Select Committee released a snippet of radio communications between Oath Keepers who were following live news coverage of the attack and reacting to President Trump's tweets. The select committee did not disclose the identities of these individuals, but they were said to be both on the ground and off-site.
  - Chairman Thompson stated that, in addition to possibly making referrals to the DOJ, the select committee may make referrals to other agencies like the Federal Election Commission.
- September 17: John McEntee, who served as Director of the White House Presidential Personnel Office in the Trump Administration, testified that Representative Matt Gaetz sought a preemptive presidential pardon relating to an ongoing DOJ investigation into possible violations of federal sex trafficking laws. The DOJ had been investigating Gaetz since early 2021 over these allegations, including whether Gaetz had a sexual relationship with a 17-year-old girl, but he had not been charged with any crimes. McEntee did not comment. A spokesperson for Gaetz commented indirectly, saying that Gaetz never directly asked Trump for a pardon.
- September 19: Vice Chair Liz Cheney and Representative Zoe Lofgren announced they would propose changes to the Electoral Count Act to make it harder to overturn a certified presidential election in the future.
- September 20: Representatives Cheney and Lofgren's bill, H.R. 8873 – The Presidential Election Reform Act, was sent to the House Committee on Rules and passed with a 9–3 vote.
- September 21:
  - HR 8873 passed the House 229–203, with all Democrats in favor. Nine Republicans, most of whom had voted for Trump's 2nd impeachment, also voted in favor. HR 8873 was said to have more detail than the Senate version, S.4573 – Electoral Count Reform and Presidential Transition Improvement Act of 2022. Senator Susan Collins, R-Maine, told the Washington Post this week that she preferred the Senate version, as it already had the approval of enough Senate Republicans to pass the filibuster threshold.
  - Ginni Thomas agreed to a voluntary interview.
- September 23: In a 60 Minutes interview, Denver Riggleman, former senior technical adviser for the January 6 Committee as well as an ex-military intelligence officer and former Republican congressman from Virginia, stated that the White House switchboard connected a telephone call to a Capitol rioter on January 6, 2021. Riggleman states that he had begged the January 6 Committee to push harder to identify the numbers. A spokesperson for the select committee that they have "run down all the leads and digested and analyzed all the information that arose from his (Riggleman's) work".
- September 25:
  - Wisconsin State Assembly Speaker Robin Vos (R) filed a lawsuit against the Jan. 6 Select Committee after receiving a subpoena calling him to testify before the committee Monday morning.
  - Representative Raskin confirmed on Meet The Press that the Select Committee is aware of the communication between the White House switchboard and a rioter during the attack on the capitol. Raskin commented "You know, I can't say anything specific about that particular call, but we are aware of it."
- September 27: With Hurricane Ian approaching Florida, the Select Committee postponed its public hearing that had been scheduled for the next day, September 28. In a joint statement, Chairman Thompson and Vice Chair Cheney stated: "We're praying for the safety of all those in the storm's path."
- September 28: The scheduled meeting was postponed because of Hurricane Ian.
- September 29: Ginni Thomas voluntarily testified in person. Chairman Thompson said Thomas still believes the presidential election was stolen and that she answered "some questions". Thomas also denied having discussed her post-election activities with her husband, a Supreme Court justice.

==== October 2022 ====
- October 4: Kelli Ward, Chair of the Arizona Republican Party, declined to answer questions during her subpoenaed testimony before the select committee.
- October 7: U.S. District Judge Diane Humetewa dismissed Ward's request to toss out the February 15 subpoena, clearing the way for the select committee to gain access to her cell phone records.
- October 11: US Capitol Police investigated a letter sent to Chairman Thompson that contained "concerning language" as well as a suspicious substance. They decided it did not pose a threat.
- October 13: Ninth public hearing. The select committee voted unanimously, on live national TV, to subpoena Donald Trump. Trump wrote a 14-page letter in reply.
- October 19: Judge David Carter orders John Eastman to turn over an additional 33 documents to the select committee. Eight emails were of particular importance: Carter said that four related to the crime of obstruction, as they suggest that Eastman and other attorneys aimed primarily to "delay or otherwise disrupt" the certification of the election without necessarily believing the legal arguments they were submitting, and another four discussed filing lawsuits as a delay tactic. Carter ruled that they were "sufficiently related to and in furtherance of a conspiracy to defraud the United States.”
- October 21:
  - Steve Bannon was sentenced to four months in prison for refusing to testify. (He went on to appeal his conviction and sentence, so he remained free until July 2024.)
  - The select committee formally subpoenaed former President Donald Trump for his testimony under oath as well as relevant records, having voted a week earlier to do so. They demanded that Trump provide documents by the morning of November 4 and testify on the morning of November 14. Vice-chair Cheney later said Trump's testimony must be closed-door and could not be broadcast live. While previous known subpoenas were signed solely by Chair Thompson, this is the first subpoena known to bear Vice-chair Cheney's signature as well.
- October 25: Hope Hicks testified.
- October 28: Eastman's lawyers gave the eight emails to the committee.
- October 31: U.S. District Court Judge Carl Nichols dismissed Mark Meadows’ lawsuit, concluding that the September 23, 2021, subpoena was valid and justified under the Constitution's legislative powers.

==== November 2022 ====
- November 1: Vice-chair Liz Cheney said the committee was "in discussions" with Trump's lawyers regarding their subpoena for his testimony under oath.
- November 2: The committee interviewed former Secret Service agent John Gutsmiedl.
- November 3: The select committee interviewed the former head of Pence's security detail, Tim Giebels.
- November 4: The select committee issued a brief public statement implying that Trump had not yet turned over any of the subpoenaed records, insisting that he "begin" producing them by "next week" and adding that his November 14 deposition date had not changed.
- November 7: The select committee interviewed the person who had driven Trump in the presidential vehicle on the day of the attack. His name was not publicly revealed. He testified that, contrary to Cassidy Hutchinson's testimony about what Tony Ornato had told her, Trump "never grabbed the steering wheel. I didn’t see him, you know, lunge to try to get into the front seat at all.”
- November 9: Trump's lawyers wrote to the select committee saying he would "consider" providing written responses instead of spoken testimony.
- November 11: Trump sued the select committee to block the October 21 subpoena. "No president or former president has ever been compelled" by a subpoena to provide documents or testimony, his lawyers argued in a 41-page filing. The lawsuit was filed in the U.S. District Court for the Southern District of Florida in West Palm Beach, the same district court where Trump recently succeeded in suing for a special master in the Mar-a-Lago documents case.
- November 14:
  - Trump did not comply with the subpoena for his deposition. The select committee complained that his lawyers "have made no attempt to negotiate an appearance of any sort, and his lawsuit parades out many of the same arguments that courts have rejected repeatedly over the last year". They said they would "evaluate next steps".
  - The U.S. Supreme Court denied Arizona GOP chair Kelli Ward's request to quash the select committee's subpoena of her phone records.
- November 15: Chairman Thompson stated that a Contempt of Congress referral targeting Trump “could be an option”.
- November 17: The select committee interviewed the former head of Trump's security detail, Robert Engel.
- November 30:
  - Wisconsin assembly speaker Robin Vos testified.
  - Chairman Thompson said the committee did not anticipate taking any further witness testimony. Representative Lofgren agreed: "We've now completed all of our interviews."
  - U.S. Attorney General Merrick Garland repeated his request for "all" interview transcripts.
  - House Minority Leader Kevin McCarthy wrote a letter warning the committee that the incoming Republican-majority House of Representatives would investigate the committee's work. Chairman Thompson replied that the committee planned to publish most of its findings anyway. He also pointed out that McCarthy had defied a subpoena, "so," Thompson said, "I think the horse has left the barn".

==== December 2022 ====
- December 6: Chairman Thompson said the select committee would issue criminal referrals to the Department of Justice but suggested that it had not yet decided whom to refer.
- December 13: The committee rescheduled its vote on criminal referrals. The new date was December 19. (Several days previously, it had said it would do this on December 21.)
- December 19:
- The Select Committee had its last public meeting.
  - Members summarized their investigative findings.
  - They recommended that Trump be charged with four crimes: 18 U.S.C §§ 1512(c), 371, 1001, and 2383.
  - They recommended that Eastman be charged with two of the same crimes.
  - They voted 9–0 to adopt the final report.
  - To audience applause, they adjourned for the final time.
- The introduction to the final report, called the "Executive Summary", was released immediately after the meeting.
  - The committee referred Representatives McCarthy, Jordan, Biggs, and Perry to the House Ethics Committee, recommending that they be sanctioned for not complying with subpoenas.
  - The committee's criminal referral to the Department of Justice also named Jeffrey Clark, Kenneth Chesebro, Mark Meadows, and Rudy Giuliani as apparent co-conspirators, though none of them were referred due to lack of evidence.
- After the meeting, Represtantive Raskin explained to reporters that more criminal referrals, including for members of Congress, would be laid out in the final report. Raskin told reporters that the committee had referred these individuals because "we felt certain that there was abundant evidence that they had participated in crimes"; he noted that DOJ may criminally charge anyone they choose, should DOJ have evidence to do so.
- Trump posted to Truth Social: "What doesn’t kill me makes me stronger." Nonetheless, Senate Minority Leader Mitch McConnell appeared to blame Trump, saying: "The entire nation knows who is responsible for that day." Other Republican leaders avoided comment.
- December 21: The committee began releasing interview transcripts.
- December 22:
  - The committee released transcripts of Cassidy Hutchinson's September 14 and 15, 2022 testimony. There, Hutchinson revealed that Trump allies had pressured her not to testify.
  - In the evening, the committee publicly released its final report. (The report had been expected the previous day but was delayed.) The report recommended that DOJ pursue criminal charges against Trump.
  - Trump posted to Truth Social, attacking the "highly partisan Unselect Committee Report" without responding to its substance. He repeated several grievances about the select committee and the report, including its failure to look into Republican allegations of security failures being the reason for the January 6 attack.
- December 24: Trump posted to Truth Social: "I had almost nothing to do with January 6th," with his lawyer describing the committee's referrals as "pretty much worthless".
- December 28: Chairman Thompson wrote to Trump's lawyers, notifying them that the committee was withdrawing its subpoena and that Trump "is no longer obligated to comply". Thompson explained that, since the new Congress would be seated in less than a week, bringing an end to the committee, "the Select Committee can no longer pursue the specific information covered by the subpoena".

== Subpoenas ==
The Select Committee's subpoena power comes pursuant to House Resolution 503, Section 5: Procedures:

"(c) Applicability of Rules Governing Procedures of Committees. – Rule XI of the Rules of Representatives shall apply to the Select Committee except as follows:

- (4) The chair of the Select Committee may authorize and issue subpoenas pursuant to clause 2(m) of rule XI in the investigation and study conducted pursuant to sections 3 and 4 of this resolution, including for the purpose of taking depositions.
- (5) The chair of the Select Committee is authorized to compel by subpoena the furnishing of information by interrogatory.
- (6)(A) The chair of the Select Committee, upon consultation with the ranking minority member, may order the taking of depositions, including pursuant to subpoena, by a Member or counsel of the Select Committee, in the same manner as a standing committee pursuant to section 3(b)(1) of House Resolution 8, One Hundred Seventeenth Congress.
- (6)(B) Depositions taken under the authority prescribed in this paragraph shall be governed by the procedures submitted by the chair of the Committee on Rules for printing in the Congressional Record on January 4, 2021.
- (7) Subpoenas authorized pursuant to this resolution may be signed by the chair of the Select Committee or a designee"

According to the Congressional Research Service, the chair (or a person they designate) can initiate and authorize subpoenas without consulting the vice-chair or other committee members.

In the January 6th investigation, some people testified and provided documents voluntarily, while others were legally compelled by subpoenas. The committee did not always publicly announce the subpoenas it issued.

Notably:

- In 2021, the committee requested the telephone records of more than 100 people, some of whom sued. In December 2022, as the committee was ending its investigation, at least seven lawsuits were still pending in DC District Court, and the committee gave up waiting and withdrew its subpoenas for the phone data of Sebastian Gorka, Stephen Miller, Cleta Mitchell, Roger Stone, photojournalist Amy Harris, and some January 6 Capitol riot defendants.
- On May 12, 2022, the committee subpoenaed five House Republicans: Jim Jordan, Mo Brooks, Scott Perry and Andy Biggs, and Minority Leader Kevin McCarthy. All five refused to cooperate. All except Brooks were referred to the DOJ at the committee's final meeting on December 19, 2022. Representative Thompson, the committee chair, had told NBC's Meet the Press on January 2, 2022, that they would have "no reluctance" to subpoena sitting members of Congress once they determined they had the authority.
- On July 15, 2022, the committee subpoenaed the U.S. Secret Service. This was the first time it had subpoenaed an agency of the executive branch. The subpoena was issued after it became known the Service had erased text messages from January 5 and 6, 2021, after the DHS inspector general had requested them for an after-action review of the Service involving the January 6 attack. Though the Service claimed the deletions were part of a long-planned "device migration", the inspector general said he believed the Service was not fully cooperating.
- On October 21, 2022, the committee subpoenaed former President Trump, but he sued to block it. Given Trump's history, it had seemed unlikely he would comply. In February 2021, for Trump's second impeachment trial, the House's lead impeachment manager, Representative Jamie Raskin, asked him to testify about the events of January 6, but he refused. Trump has consistently urged other Republicans not to cooperate with the House committee's investigation, and he has not cooperated with other major investigations of his own alleged crimes in other matters. Had the full House voted to hold him in criminal contempt of Congress before the new Congress began in early January 2023, DOJ could have charged him for contempt of Congress.

Known subpoenas of individuals and organizations
Name	Role	Subpoenaed	Deposition	Outcome
Telecom carriers	call detail records for more than 100 people	summer/fall 2021	N/A	Unknown
Mark Meadows	former White House chief of staff	September 23, 2021	orig. October 15, 2021; November 12, 2021	criminal referral to DOJ; DOJ previously said it would not indict him though he originally did not appear, later cooperated, then stopped and sued; the judge dismissed his lawsuit on October 31, 2022
Daniel Scavino	former White House Deputy Chief of Staff for Communications	September 23, 2021	orig. October 15, 2021 postponed six times	DOJ said it would not indict him
Kash Patel	Former Chief of Staff to Acting Secretary of Defense Christopher C. Miller	September 23, 2021	orig. October 14, 2021; December 9, 2021	appeared
Steve Bannon	Former White House Chief Strategist and Senior Counselor to President Trump	September 23, 2021	October 14, 2021	indicted, convicted and sentenced; was in prison for four months
Amy Kremer	Founder and Chair of Women For America First; Mother of Kylie Kremer	September 29, 2021	October 29, 2021	
Kylie Kremer	Founder and executive director of Women For America First; Daughter of Amy Kremer	September 29, 2021	October 29, 2021	
Cynthia Chafian	submitted the first permit application on behalf of WFAF for the January 6 rally, and founder of the Eighty Percent Coalition	September 29, 2021	October 28, 2021	
Caroline Wren	"VIP Advisor" for January 6, per rally permit	September 29, 2021	October 26, 2021	
Maggie Mulvaney	"VIP Lead" for January 6, per rally permit	September 29, 2021	October 26, 2021	
Justin Caporale	Event Strategies, Inc.; "Project Manager" for January 6, per rally permit	September 29, 2021	October 25, 2021	
Tim Unes	Event Strategies, Inc.; "Stage Manager" for January 6, per rally permit	September 29, 2021	October 25, 2021	
Megan Powers	MPowers Consulting LLC; "Operations Manager for Scheduling and Guidance" for January 6, per rally permit	September 29, 2021	October 21, 2021	
Hannah Salem Stone	logistics for rally	September 29, 2021	October 22, 2021	
Lyndon Brentnall	"on-site supervisor" for the rally; owner of a security company	September 29, 2021	October 22, 2021	
Katrina Pierson	national spokesperson for the 2016 Trump campaign	September 29, 2021	November 3, 2021	
Ali Alexander	connected to "Stop the Steal" rally permit	October 7, 2021	October 29, 2021	reportedly cooperating as of April 2022
Nathan Martin	connected to "Stop the Steal" rally permit	October 7, 2021	October 28, 2021	
Stop the Steal LLC	organization; George B. Coleman, "custodian of records", will be deposed	October 7, 2021	N/A	
Jeffrey Clark	former Assistant Attorney General for the Environment and Natural Resources Division	October 13, 2021	October 29, 2021	criminal referral to DOJ; Fifth Amendment (refused to testify) at February 2, 2022, appearance; previously had invoked executive privilege (refused to testify) at November 5, 2021, appearance and was rescheduled due to illness
William Stepien	Trump 2020 Campaign Manager	November 8, 2021	December 13, 2021	
Jason Miller	Trump Campaign Senior Advisor	November 8, 2021	December 10, 2021	
John Eastman	conservative lawyer and former professor	November 8, 2021	December 8, 2021	criminal referral to DOJ; previously took Fifth Amendment (refused to testify)
Michael Flynn	former Trump National Security Advisor	November 8, 2021	orig. December 6, 2021 postponed	Fifth Amendment (refused to testify) when he appeared March 10, after unsuccessfully suing to invalidate the subpoena
Angela McCallum	Trump Campaign Executive Assistant	November 8, 2021	November 30, 2021	
Bernard Kerik	present at the meetings at the Willard Hotel	November 8, 2021	December 3, 2021	appeared voluntarily on January 13, 2022
Nick Luna	Personal Assistant to Trump	November 9, 2021	orig. December 6, 2021 postponed	
Molly Michael	Executive Assistant and Oval Office Operations Coordinator	November 9, 2021	December 2, 2021	
Ben Williamson	Senior Advisor to Chief of Staff Mark Meadows	November 9, 2021	December 2, 2021	
Christopher Liddell	Deputy Chief of Staff	November 9, 2021	November 30, 2021	
John McEntee	White House Presidential Personnel Office Director	November 9, 2021	December 15, 2021	
Keith Kellogg	National Security Advisor to the Vice President Mike Pence	November 9, 2021	December 1, 2021	testified
Kayleigh McEnany	former White House Press Secretary	November 9, 2021	December 3, 2021	appeared on January 12
Stephen Miller	Director of Speechwriting and Senior Advisor on Policy under Former President Trump	November 9, 2021	December 14, 2021	
Cassidy Hutchinson	Special Assistant to the President and Coordinator for Legislative Affairs	November 9, 2021	December 1, 2021	testified four times behind closed doors, including February 23 and March 7, 2022, before speaking at the committee's sixth public hearing on June 28, 2022; in 2026, Representative Loudermilk made a criminal referral, accusing her of having lied to Congress during her testimony, and the Justice Department directed its civil rights division to investigate her
Kenneth Klukowski	Senior Counsel to Assistant Attorney General Jeffrey Clark	November 9, 2021	November 29, 2021	
Alex Jones	InfoWars Host	November 22, 2021	December 18, 2021	Fifth Amendment (refused to testify)
Roger Stone	Republican Operative	November 22, 2021	December 17, 2021	Fifth Amendment (refused to testify)
Duston Stockton	Stop the Steal Organizer	November 22, 2021	December 14, 2021	
Jennifer Lawrence	Stop the Steal Organizer	November 22, 2021	December 15, 2021	
Taylor Budowich	Trump Spokesman; Communications Director of Save America PAC	November 22, 2021	December 16, 2021	testified; sued to block release of financial records, but the committee had already received them
Oath Keepers	Far-Right Militia organization	November 23, 2021	N/A	
Proud Boys	Far-Right Militia organization	November 23, 2021	December 7, 2021	
Stewart Rhodes	Oath Keepers Founder	November 23, 2021	December 14, 2021	indicted by federal prosecutors; convicted of seditious conspiracy
Enrique Tarrio	Chairman of the Proud Boys and Florida State Director of Latinos for Trump	November 23, 2021	December 15, 2021	indicted by federal prosecutors; charged with conspiracy and sedition
Robert Patrick Lewis	1st Amendment Praetorian	November 23, 2021	December 16, 2021	
Marc Short	Pence's Chief of Staff	November 2021	January 26, 2022	testified; may have received a "friendly" subpoena to encourage cooperation
Max Miller	Associate Director of the Presidential Personnel Office and Special Assistant to Former President Trump	December 10, 2021	January 6, 2022	
Robert "Bobby" Peede Jr.	Former Deputy Assistant to Former President Trump and Director of Presidential Advance	December 10, 2021	January 7, 2022	
Brian Jack	Trump White House Political Director	December 10, 2021	January 10, 2022	
Bryan Lewis	Trump aide who helped plan rally	December 10, 2021	January 4, 2022	
Ed Martin	Trump ally who helped plan rally	December 10, 2021	January 5, 2022	
Kimberly Fletcher	ties to "Moms for America", helped plan rallies	December 10, 2021	January 4, 2022	
Phil Waldron	author of the PowerPoint presentation titled "Election Fraud, Foreign Interference & Options for 6 JAN"	December 16, 2021	January 17, 2022	
Andy Surabian	adviser to Donald Trump Jr.	January 11, 2022	January 31, 2022	
Arthur Schwartz	adviser to Donald Trump Jr.	January 11, 2022	February 1, 2022	
Ross Worthington	former White House official; helped Trump draft his January 6 rally speech	January 11, 2022	February 2, 2022	
Meta, Alphabet, YouTube, Twitter, Reddit	Social media companies	January 13, 2022	N/A	
Rudy Giuliani	former Trump personal attorney	January 18, 2022	orig. February 8, 2021 postponed	criminal referral to DOJ
Sidney Powell	former Trump attorney	January 18, 2022	February 8, 2022	sued to block release of phone records
Jenna Ellis	former Trump attorney	January 18, 2022	February 8, 2022	
Boris Epshteyn	former Trump advisor	January 18, 2022	February 8, 2022	
Eric Trump	son of Trump	reported January 18, 2022	phone metadata	records obtained
Kimberly Guilfoyle	Trump advisor, then-fiancée of Donald Trump Jr.	reported January 18, 2022	phone metadata	records obtained
Nick Fuentes	Groypers leader, White Nationalist Activist, podcast host	January 19, 2022	February 9, 2022	
Patrick Casey	Far-right activist	January 19, 2022	February 9, 2022	
Nancy Cottle	Listed as chairperson for Arizona on false slate of Trump electors	January 28, 2022	February 16, 2022	
Loraine B. Pellegrino	Listed as secretary for Arizona on false slate of Trump electors	January 28, 2022	February 16, 2022	
David Shafer	Listed as chairperson for Georgia on false slate of Trump electors	January 28, 2022	February 21, 2022	
Shawn Still	Listed as secretary for Georgia on false slate of Trump electors	January 28, 2022	February 21, 2022	
Kathy Berden	Listed as chairperson for Michigan on false slate of Trump electors	January 28, 2022	February 22, 2022	
Mayra Rodriguez	Listed as secretary for Michigan on false slate of Trump electors	January 28, 2022	February 22, 2022	
Jewll Powdrell	Listed as chairperson for New Mexico on false slate of Trump electors	January 28, 2022	February 23, 2022	
Deborah W. Maestas	Listed as secretary for New Mexico on false slate of Trump electors	January 28, 2022	February 23, 2022	
Michael J. McDonald	Listed as chairperson for Nevada on false slate of Trump electors	January 28, 2022	February 24, 2022	
James DeGraffenreid	Listed as secretary for Nevada on false slate of Trump electors	January 28, 2022	February 24, 2022	
Bill Bachenberg	Listed as chairperson for Pennsylvania on false slate of Trump electors	January 28, 2022	February 25, 2022	
Lisa Patton	Listed as secretary for Pennsylvania on false slate of Trump electors	January 28, 2022	February 25, 2022	
Andrew Hitt	Listed as chairperson for Wisconsin on false slate of Trump electors	January 28, 2022	February 28, 2022	
Kelly Ruh	Listed as secretary for Wisconsin on false slate of Trump electors	January 28, 2022	February 28, 2022	
Judd Deere	Trump deputy White House press secretary	January 28, 2022		
Peter Navarro	Trump economic advisor	February 9, 2022	March 2, 2022	indicted, convicted and sentenced; was in prison for four months
Laura Cox	Former Michigan Republican Party Chairwoman	February 15, 2022	March 8, 2022	
Kelli Ward	Arizona Republican Party Chairwoman	February 15, 2022	March 8, 2022	Fifth Amendment (refused to answer substantive questions); appeared October 4, 2022
Gary Michael Brown	Deputy Director of Election Day Operations for 2020 Trump campaign	February 15, 2022	March 9, 2022	
Douglas V. Mastriano	Pennsylvania state senator, planned false slate of Trump electors	February 15, 2022	March 10, 2022	appeared briefly on August 9, but did not answer questions; complied with request for documents; used campaign donations to pay lawyer; sued
Michael A. Roman	Director of Election Day Operations for 2020 Trump campaign	February 15, 2022	March 14, 2022	
Mark Finchem	Arizona state legislator, "Stop the Steal" backer	February 15, 2022	March 15, 2022	
Salesforce.com	Software company, RNC's fundraising platform	February 23, 2022	March 16, 2022	the Select Committee dropped its subpoena on Salesforce
Kenneth Chesebro	Attorney who worked on efforts to overturn election	March 1, 2022	October 26, 2022	criminal referral to DOJ
Christina Bobb	Attorney who worked on efforts to overturn election, OANN host	March 1, 2022	March 23, 2022	
Kurt Olsen	Attorney who worked on efforts to overturn election	March 1, 2022	March 24, 2022	sued to block subpoena March 24, 2022
Phill Kline	Attorney who worked on efforts to overturn election, OANN host	March 1, 2022	March 25, 2022	
Cleta Mitchell	Attorney who worked on efforts to overturn election	March 1, 2022	March 28, 2022	
Katherine Friess	Attorney who worked on efforts to overturn election	March 1, 2022	March 29, 2022	
Kimberly Guilfoyle	Trump advisor, then-fiancée of Donald Trump Jr.	March 3, 2022	March 15, 2022	
Scott Perry	Representative for Pennsylvania's 10th congressional district	May 12, 2022	May 26, 2022	criminal referral to DOJ
Andy Biggs	Representative for Arizona's 5th congressional district	May 12, 2022	May 26, 2022	criminal referral to DOJ
Jim Jordan	Representative for Ohio's 4th congressional district	May 12, 2022	May 27, 2022	criminal referral to DOJ
Kevin McCarthy	House Minority Leader	May 12, 2022	May 31, 2022	criminal referral to DOJ
Mo Brooks	Representative for Alabama's 5th congressional district, spoke at rally	May 12, 2022	May 31, 2022	
Pat Cipollone	White House Counsel	June 29, 2022	July 6, 2022	scheduled for closed-door, videotaped testimony on July 8, 2022
U.S. Secret Service	Department of Homeland Security agency; erased text messages	July 15, 2022	N/A	
Patrick Philbin	White House deputy counsel under Pat Cipollone	reported August 3, 2022		
Robin Vos	Speaker of the Wisconsin State Assembly	September 23, 2022	September 26, 2022	sued; did not appear
Donald Trump	former President	October 21, 2022	November 14, 2022 (demanded)	criminal referral to DOJ; previously sued and said he would not appear

== Reactions ==
=== Prior to committee formation ===
According to several reports, Minority Leader Kevin McCarthy had warned Republican members that if they allowed Speaker Nancy Pelosi to appoint them to the select committee, they would be stripped of all their other committee assignments and should not expect to receive any future ones from Pelosi. In an interview with Forbes, Representative Adam Kinzinger said "Who gives a shit?" and added, "When you've got people who say crazy stuff and you're not gonna make that threat, but you make that threat to truth-tellers, you've lost any credibility."

Republican House Leader McCarthy called the rejection of his initial recommendations "unprecedented" in a phone call with Pelosi. In a press conference, he labeled her a "lame duck speaker" out to destroy the institution. The Freedom Caucus pushed for McCarthy to file a motion to vacate the speakership, and punish Cheney and Kinzinger for accepting their appointments to the committee. McCarthy later dubbed them "Pelosi Republicans". Republicans also stated that if they won the House majority in the 2022 midterm elections, they would come after Democratic committee assignments, targeting Eric Swalwell and Ilhan Omar. Republican House Whip Steve Scalise stated that Pelosi had removed any credibility from the committee for rejecting their recommended members and opted instead for a political narrative. Republicans Scott Perry, Chip Roy, and Kelly Armstrong expressed their disdain for both Cheney and Kinzinger and questioned their loyalty to the House Republican Conference, pushing for them to be stripped of their committee assignments. Jim Banks and Mike Rogers stated that the two GOP committee members would be stuck to Pelosi's narrative of events. Cheney and Kinzinger both dismissed comments from their colleagues.

After Speaker Nancy Pelosi rejected two of Minority Leader Kevin McCarthy's picks for the committee and appointed Adam Schiff, The Wall Street Journal editorial board criticized her; while acknowledging that McCarthy's picks were partisan, it claimed that Schiff had "lied repeatedly about the evidence concerning the Trump campaign's collusion with Russia". The editorial board posited, "if Mrs. Pelosi thinks the evidence for her conclusion is persuasive, why would she not want to have it tested against the most aggressive critics?" On the other hand, the San Francisco Chronicle editorial board said: "Pelosi's chief mistake was not also rejecting Rep. Troy Nehls of Texas, who, like Jordan, Banks and a majority of House Republicans, voted to overturn the election on the day of the insurrection. No serious investigation of the riot can be undertaken by those who shared the goals of the rioters." It added that "McCarthy and company killed an independent, bipartisan commission to investigate the attack even though the Republicans' top negotiator agreed to the terms."

=== After committee formation ===
Some House Republicans—including House Minority Leader Kevin McCarthy and Representative Jim Jordan—said they did not watch the committee's first hearing on July 27, 2021. Representative Matthew M. Rosendale said he watched Representative Liz Cheney speak (and was "quite disappointed") but did not watch the police officers' testimony. Republican Conference Chair Elise Stefanik would not say whether she watched.

In late August 2021, after the committee asked telecommunications and social media companies to retain certain records, McCarthy declared that if the companies "turn over private information" to the House committee, then the companies are "in violation of federal law and subject to losing their ability to operate in the United States", and that a future Republican legislative majority will hold the companies "fully accountable". In response to McCarthy's comment, the watchdog group Citizens for Responsibility and Ethics in Washington (CREW) filed a complaint on September 3 with the chief counsel of the Office of Congressional Ethics. CREW noted that the subpoena was legally valid and claimed that McCarthy was illegally obstructing the investigation insofar as he was "threatening retaliation" against the telecommunications companies. Eleven House Republicans who were associated with the January 6 "Stop the Steal" rally sent a September 3 letter to thirteen telecommunications companies stating they "do not consent to the release of confidential call records or data" and threatened legal action against what they asserted were unconstitutional subpoenas.

During a September 2 television interview, McCarthy was asked about "how deeply [Trump] was involved", to which he replied that the FBI and Senate committees had found "no involvement". He and other Republicans had cited an exclusive Reuters report that unnamed current and former law enforcement officials said the FBI had found "scant evidence" of an organized plot to overturn the election. In a September 4 statement, Thompson and Cheney said the committee had queried executive branch agencies and congressional committees investigating the matter and "it's been made clear to us that reports of such a conclusion are baseless."

On October 16, The Lincoln Project co-founder Rick Wilson criticized the committee's glacial progress, stating that "I don't believe that they're pursuing this with the degree of vigor that merits the type of targets they're talking about. We're dealing with people like Steve Bannon and Roger Stone and Ali Alexander ... They've had three months, they've done almost nothing."

Representative Scott Perry said on December 21 that he would not cooperate with the committee because, in his view, the committee itself was "illegitimate, and not duly constituted under the rules of the US House of Representatives". Similarly, on January 23, 2022, Newt Gingrich said on Fox News that he believed the committee was breaking laws, but he did not specify which laws.

On December 23, Laurence Tribe, American legal scholar and University Professor Emeritus of Constitutional Law at Harvard University, and colleagues published in The New York Times about Attorney General Merrick Garland: "Only by holding the leaders of the Jan. 6 insurrection – all of them – to account can he secure the future and teach the next generation that no one is above the law. If he has not done so already, we implore the attorney general to step up to that task."

In June 2022, Fox News announced that it would not carry live coverage of the hearings, relegating it to its sister channel Fox Business and local Fox network affiliates. Fox News instead carried special editions of Tucker Carlson Tonight and Hannity (the former notably airing commercial-free) that largely featured criticism of the hearing, with Carlson deeming it "propaganda", and lower thirds describing it as a "sham", "show trial" and "political theater". The Washington Post reported that members of the committee were given increased security due to greater threats made against them.

On December 21, a Republican-led "shadow committee" consisting of the five House members who Republican Leader Kevin McCarthy initially nominated to the official select committee released its final investigative report, which primarily focused on alleged failures of law enforcement agencies and House Democratic leaders in the lead up to the January 6 attack. The shadow committee's report accused the U.S. Capitol Police of mishandling critical intelligence in the lead-up to the attack, and placed overall blame for security failures on House Speaker Nancy Pelosi and the House Democratic leadership, which the report claims were "closely involved in security decisions in the lead up to and on January 6".

=== After the final report ===
In December 2022, Donald Trump responded to the committee's final report by calling the members "Marxists" and "sick people".

On February 22, 2023, Timothy Heaphy, who had served as the committee's top investigator, said he expected "indictments both in Georgia and at the federal level."

On March 8, 2023, the Republican-controlled House Administration's subcommittee on oversight opened an investigation to review the former House select committee's activities. On August 25, Representative Barry Loudermilk, who was leading the inquiry, requested that the White House provide unredacted transcripts of the committee's interviews with Secret Service agents. On March 11, 2024, the committee released a report criticizing the former House select committee's activities.

In August 2023, Trump was charged with election interference, both federally and in Georgia. Those indictments resemble the information, conclusions, and recommendations made by the House select committee. Former Representative Kinzinger said the DOJ indictment "should have come down a year ago". Representative Raskin told Axios that while the House select committee had delivered "a huge amount of factual information," the federal indictment included "several quoted statements that were definitely new to me." Representative Schiff said that these "new pieces of information" were "principally from witnesses who refused to appear before our committee".

On June 28, 2024, the Supreme Court decided in Fischer v. United States that prosecutors could validly bring an obstruction charge against someone for attempting to block the arrival of electoral certificates (which would likely apply to Trump and other high-level aides) but not simply for attempting to forcibly enter the Capitol building (as many rioters did).

Three days later, on July 1, 2024, the Supreme Court decided in Trump v. United States that all former presidents have absolute immunity for their acts as president within their constitutional purview, presumptive immunity for official acts, and no immunity for unofficial acts.

On December 8, 2024, Trump said in an interview with NBC News that every member of the committee should be jailed: "Everybody on that committee … for what they did, yeah, honestly, they should go to jail". He falsely alleged the committee had "deleted and destroyed all the evidence".

On December 15, Senator Bernie Sanders told NBC that Biden should consider preemptively pardoning the committee members. Biden did so on January 19, 2025, pardoning all members and staffers as well as four police officers who testified.

Later on January 20, 2025, after the pardon was announced, Trump, upon taking office, granted clemency to all of the January 6 rioters. One of them, Proud Boys leader Enrique Tarrio, pardoned of seditious conspiracy and interviewed by Alex Jones the next day, urged the government to investigate Attorney General Merrick Garland (who was replaced two weeks later by Pam Bondi) as well as former U.S. attorney Matthew Graves.

On January 22, House Majority Leader Mike Johnson announced a formation of a panel to investigate the January 6 committee in what The Associated Press described as "an effort to defend Trump's actions that day and dispute the work of a bipartisan committee that investigated the siege two years ago".

On February 4, responding to a Justice Department order to identify which of its 38,000 employees had worked on the investigations of the Capitol attack, the FBI named over 5,000 employees, immediately after which the FBI Agents Association sued the Justice Department.

=== Polling ===
According to a poll conducted in July 2021 by Politico, a majority of Americans support the January 6 investigation, with 58% overall supporting and 29% opposing; 52% of Republicans polled opposed it. When Politico repeated the poll in December 2021, again, three-fifths supported the committee, including 82% of Democrats, 58% of independents, and 40% of Republicans.

In an August 2021 Harvard CAPS-Harris Poll, 58% of American voters said they thought the committee was biased, while 42% thought it was fair. In September 2021, a Pew Research poll found that only 11% of American adults said they were very confident the committee would be fair and reasonable while another 34% were somewhat confident, while a 54% majority said they were not too confident (32%) or not at all confident (22%). Confidence was highly partisan: Nearly two-thirds of Democrats and less than a quarter of Republicans said they were at least somewhat confident.

Just greater than half of Americans polled believe that Trump should face criminal charges for his role in the attack. A Washington Post–ABC News poll taken a week after the attack found 54% giving this response, and over a year later, it had not changed substantially, as 52% gave the same response to the same organization's poll conducted April 24–28, 2022. The division is partisan: five out of six Democrats support charging Trump, while five out of six Republicans oppose doing so.

NBC News found that the percentage of Americans who believe that Trump was solely or mainly responsible for the January 6 attack dropped from 52% in January 2021 to 45% in May 2022. A decrease was found within all subgroups: Democrats, Republicans, and independents. Opinions changed after the committee began public hearings. An Ipsos poll conducted June 17–18, 2022, found that 58% of Americans believe Trump is significantly responsible for the attack on the Capitol. An Associated Press-NORC Center for Public Affairs Research poll conducted June 23–27, 2022, found that 48% of Americans believe Trump should be charged with a crime.

The same Ipsos poll on June 17–18, 2022, also found that 60% of Americans believe the committee's investigation is fair and impartial. Similarly, an Economist/YouGov poll conducted June 18–21, 2022, found that 78% of Democrats, but only 15% of Republicans and 37% of independents, believe the committee's investigation is "legitimate". 78% of Democrats, but only 22% of Republicans and 41% of independents, said they "strongly" or "somewhat" approved of the committee's work.

== Aftermath ==
=== Ethics committee referral ===
Although representatives McCarthy, Jordan, Biggs, and Perry were referred to the House Ethics Committee at the end of 2022, there may never have been any such review. The House Ethics Committee typically operates with little transparency, proceeds slowly, and may not announce if it closes a case, according to Walter Shaub and Paul Kane. On January 9, 2023, under McCarthy's leadership, the Republican-controlled House passed a new House rules package that weakened the Office of Congressional Ethics.

=== Republican counterinvestigations ===
On November 30, 2022, House Minority Leader Kevin McCarthy wrote a letter warning the committee that the incoming Republican-majority House of Representatives planned to investigate the committee's work.

This investigation was done in the 118th Congress by the Committee on House Administration's Subcommittee on Oversight, chaired by Representative Barry Loudermilk. On March 11, 2024, it released its "Initial Findings Report", and on December 17, 2024, it released its "Interim report on the failures and politicization of the January 6th select committee". Three weeks later, Representative Joseph Morelle, the top Democrat on the House Administration Committee, directly responded to Loudermilk's two-year investigation, writing that the Republicans had “failed to produce any new material findings related to Capitol security”.

On January 22, 2025, House speaker Mike Johnson announced that the 119th Congress would investigate "false narratives" about the Capitol attack. Representative Loudermilk was to lead this new subcommittee of the House Judiciary Committee. In early June, six months after Loudermilk had last discussed the issue with Trump directly, Trump asked him why the project had stalled (as Loudermilk told reporters). In July, it was again announced that Loudermilk would lead the project, a select subcommittee with subpoena power. On September 3, a procedural vote in the House established the Select Subcommittee to Investigate the Remaining Questions Surrounding January 6. House minority leader Hakeem Jeffries appointed three Democrats to it: Eric Swalwell, Jasmine Crockett and Jared Moskowitz. Jack Smith offered to testify publicly before the House Judiciary committee, but the committee chair, Jim Jordan, declined his offer and instead subpoenaed him for private testimony.

On August 1, 2025, the Office of Special Counsel announced it had opened an investigation into Jack Smith, alleging that his investigations had been politically motivated. Former federal prosecutor Andrew Weissmann opined on MSNBC that bringing a case against Smith "is the last thing that you would think the Trump administration and Trump himself would want. He spent years trying to avoid — and largely being successful at avoiding — any of these cases going to trial. And if he's going to have a trial here, that's going to be a forum for Jack Smith and people to put on the evidence that he has tried for so long to avoid."

=== Recognition ===
On January 2, 2025, chair Bennie Thompson and vice chair Liz Cheney were awarded the Presidential Citizens Medal by President Joe Biden, who described them as "elected officials who served in difficult times with honor, decency, and ensure our democracy delivers".

The committee's members were nominated for the 2025 Nobel Peace Prize for their "defense of freedom and democracy."
