= Hugo Lowell =

British-American journalist

- Born: March 30, 1999 (age 27); New York City, U.S.
- Occupation: Journalist
- Years active: 2021–present
- Employer: Conde Nast
- Title: White House Correspondent
- Awards: National Press Club Sandy Hume Memorial Award for Excellence in Political Journalism (2022)

Hugo Lowell (born March 30, 1999) is an American journalist who is a correspondent at WIRED magazine covering President Donald Trump. He previously worked as a White House correspondent for The Guardian in Washington, D.C., where he broke several high-profile stories cited by outlets including The New York Times, The Washington Post and CNN.

He rose to prominence covering the federal and congressional investigations into Trump, including Trump's retention of classified documents and the House January 6 select committee investigation. In 2022, he won the National Press Club's political journalism award for a series of stories about Trump's efforts to overturn the 2020 election at the January 6 joint session of Congress.

== Early life and education ==
Lowell was born in New York City. He was educated at the Dalton School, a private co-educational day school on the Upper East Side of Manhattan, and St Paul's School, a private boys' day school in the suburban district of Barnes, in the London Borough of Richmond upon Thames, in the West of London. He earned a BSc in Economics and Philosophy from the University of Bristol and spent time at a private equity firm in London before becoming a Washington-based reporter.

== Career ==
From May 2021, Lowell worked as a congressional reporter for the Guardian, covering House Democrats and then-Speaker Nancy Pelosi. Later that year, he led the newspaper's coverage of the House January 6 committee.

In November 2021, Lowell broke the story that Trump had called political operatives based at a “war room” in the Willard hotel and asked them about ways to obstruct the certification President Joe Biden's election win the night before the January 6 attack on the US Capitol.

The Trump war room scoop led to the House January 6 committee to open a new line of inquiry, issue a subpoena to a senior Trump adviser and won the 2022 National Press Club's Sandy Hume Memorial Award for Excellence in Political Journalism.

In June 2023, during the criminal investigation into Trump's retention of classified documents at his Mar-a-Lago property, Lowell reported on the contents of confidential notes dictated by Trump's lawyer Evan Corcoran that were subpoenaed and later used by the Special Counsel Jack Smith to indict Trump for obstruction of justice.

In July 2023, the day before Trump was indicted in the documents case, Lowell also broke the news that Trump had known for weeks that he was a “target” in the criminal investigation, an indication from prosecutors that he was likely to be charged.

Lowell was named a White House correspondent for the Guardian following Trump's victory in the 2024 presidential elections, assigned to cover the Trump administration's national security and legal policy.

In April 2026, Lowell joined Condé Nast and WIRED magazine as a senior political correspondent based in Washington D.C. He currently authors a weekly Trump White House newsletter for WIRED and appears on Morning Joe on MS NOW the following day to discuss his reporting.
