= Molly Michael =

American political operative

Executive Assistant to the President
- In office February 2, 2019 – January 20, 2021
- President: Donald Trump
- Preceded by: Madeleine Westerhout
- Succeeded by: Ashley Williams

Personal details
- Born: Molly Amelia Michael
- Party: Republican
- Education: Palm Beach Atlantic University (BA)

Molly Amelia Michael is an American political operative and former government staffer. She was a Deputy Assistant to the President and Executive Assistant to the President during the Trump Administration. Michael was a key figure in President Donald Trump's day-to-day life at the White House and in his post-presidency life.

== Early life ==
Michael grew up outside of Chicago and attended Palm Beach Atlantic University. While in college, she was a legal intern with attorney Scott Hawkins, former president of the Florida Bar Association. She served as a political intern with Florida House member Mark Pafford.

== Career ==
Michael started working at the White House in 2017. In 2018, Michael became President Trump's executive assistant in the White House. In December 2020, Michael conveyed information from the President regarding alleged election fraud to high-ranking administration officials. Michael was notably absent from work on the morning of January 6, 2021 for personal reasons, which may have contributed to some of the gaps in President Trump's call logs that day.

After President Trump left the White House, Michael remained in his service. She was reportedly close enough to him to proactively reach out to friends and allies to ask them to contact the former president with "positive affirmations."

In November 2021, Michael received a subpoena from the Select Committee to Investigate the January 6 Attack on the United States Capitol. In March 2022, she appeared before the Select Committee, describing herself as an employee of Save America, Donald Trump's political action committee.

Because of her proximity to the former president, Michael is considered a key witness in many of the legal proceedings against the President. Unlike other current and former staffers of his, she has reportedly demonstrated cooperative behavior with law enforcement. In 2022, following the FBI's search of Mar-a-Lago related to the classified documents, Michael helped transfer additional files to the FBI upon discovering them in her work area. Some of those documents included to-do lists written on classified documents. President Trump reportedly urged her not to tell law enforcement officials about her knowledge of any classified documents that were improperly handled. Legal analysts described her as a potential "witness from hell" for former President Trump.
