= Patrick F. Philbin =

American lawyer

Patrick Philbin
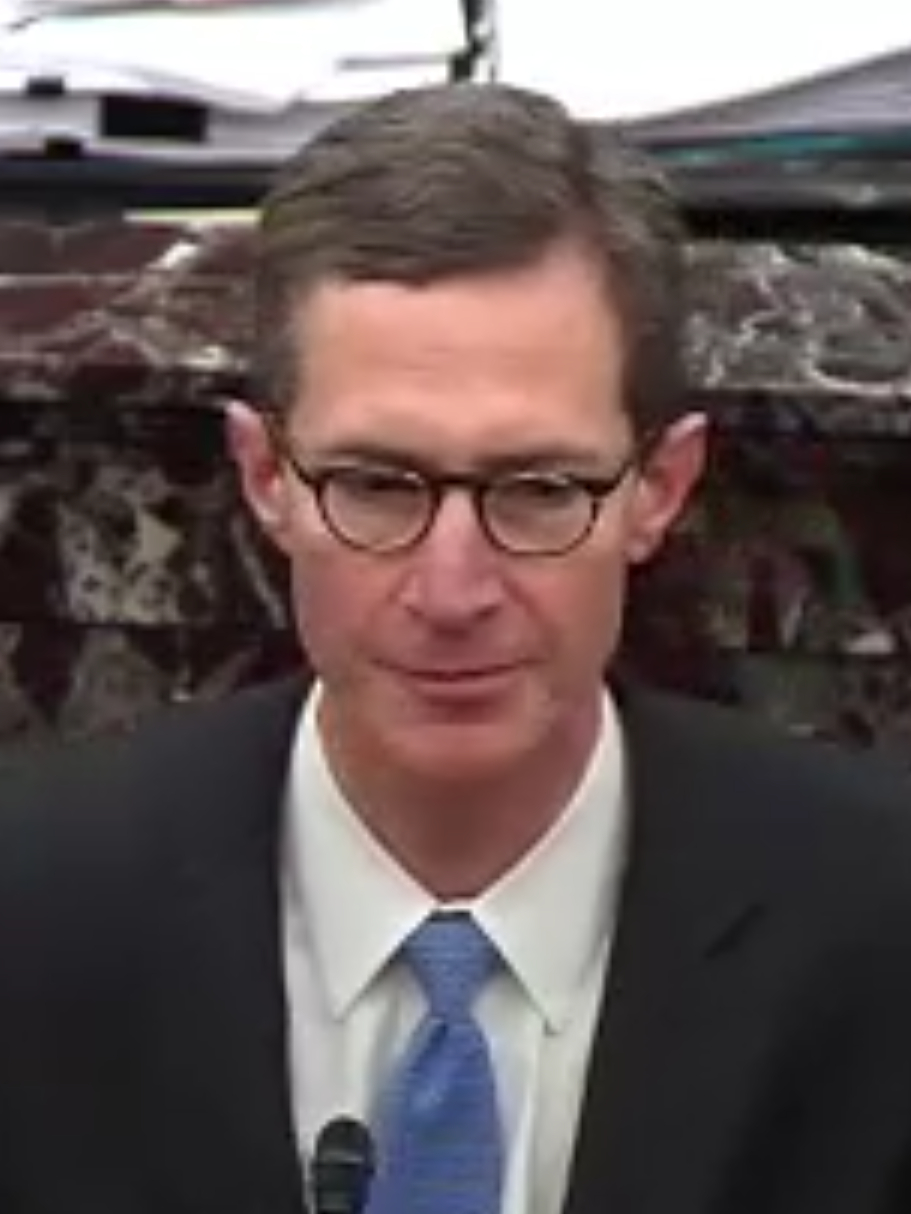

Deputy White House Counsel
- In office February 2019 – January 20, 2021
- President: Donald Trump
- Leader: Pat Cipollone
- Succeeded by: Stuart F. Delery; Danielle Conley; Jonathan Su

Personal details
- Party: Republican
- Education: Yale University (BA); Harvard University (JD); University of Cambridge (Dipl.)

Patrick F. Philbin is an American lawyer who served as Deputy Counsel to the President and Deputy Assistant to the President in the Office of White House Counsel in the Donald Trump administration. He previously served in the Department of Justice during the George W. Bush administration.

== Academics ==
Philbin is a graduate of the Roxbury Latin School in Boston, Massachusetts. He holds a B.A. in History from Yale University where he graduated summa cum laude in 1989 and was a member of Phi Beta Kappa. He received his J.D. from Harvard Law School in 1992, magna cum laude, where he was executive editor of the Harvard Law Review. In addition, he received a Diploma in Legal Studies from the University of Cambridge in 1995.

== Career ==
Philbin first served as a law clerk for Federal Appeals Court Judge Laurence Silberman. Next he worked as a clerk for Supreme Court Justice Clarence Thomas. Following his clerkships, Philbin entered private practice in the Washington, D.C. office of Kirkland & Ellis LLP.

During the Bush Administration, Philbin served as a political appointee in the Department of Justice, first as a deputy assistant attorney general in the Office of Legal Counsel from 2001 to 2003 and then as an associate deputy attorney general in the Office of the Deputy Attorney General from 2003 to 2005. Philbin was one of the lawyers who helped counsel President Bush that as head of the United States' Government executive branch, the president had the authority to charge Guantanamo captives before military commissions (see the Legal opinions section of the Wikipedia article on John Yoo).

During the Bush administration, Philbin reviewed the Torture Memos and raised concerns with John Yoo and Jay Bybee about their contents. An investigation by the Office of Professional Responsibility concluded that Philbin did not commit any professional misconduct and appropriately raised his concerns about the shortcomings of the Bybee opinion.

According to James Comey, Acting Attorney General at the time, Philbin was present in March 2004 when Comey rushed to John Ashcroft's hospital bed to try to prevent other Bush officials – White House Chief of Staff Andy Card and the man who was then White House counsel, Alberto Gonzales – from persuading the very sick Attorney General to reverse Comey's decision as Acting Attorney General to not approve renewal of the controversial warrantless wiretap program during the war on terror. Philbin was "one of the people who started the legal review of the spying program that concluded the program was illegal", and Comey testified that Philbin's career suffered for his support of Comey's intervention between Gonzales and Ashcroft; according to Comey, Vice President Dick Cheney blocked Philbin's appointment to the position of Principal Deputy Solicitor General, denying him the honor of working on behalf of the government before the Supreme Court.

Philbin returned to private practice in 2005, returning as a partner to Kirkland & Ellis, where he focused on appellate litigation, complex litigation, and data security. In 2019, Philbin was appointed as Deputy Counsel to the President and Deputy Assistant to the President in the Office of White House Counsel in the Trump Administration. In 2020, he was appointed to the defense team that represented President Trump in the first Senate impeachment trial.

== See also ==
- List of law clerks for the tenth seat of the Supreme Court of the United States
