= List of alleged Georgia election racketeers =

List of alleged Georgia election racketeers is a list of people directly involved in the Georgia election racketeering prosecution including those who have pled guilty, the remaining defendants, and unindicted co-conspirators.

== Pleaded guilty ==
Four of the nineteen individuals who were indicted have pleaded guilty as of October 24, 2023.

- Kenneth Chesebro, pro-Trump lawyer who acted as an outside adviser, seven felony charges. He pled guilty on October 20, 2023. The original charges related to writing memos and emails describing how Georgia and other states could "convene and cast false Electoral College votes". Politically liberal until around 2016, after earning his law degree he worked on prominent cases such as the Iran–Contra investigation as a deputy special counsel, and Bush v. Gore as research assistant for his former Harvard law professor, Laurence Tribe. However, Chesebro's political views had flipped by 2016 when he assisted Eastman with litigation against birthright citizenship, upon which Trump had been campaigning since 2015. He wrote three memos in 2020—dated November 18, December 6, and December 9—originating the idea of creating "alternate slates of electors" in states Biden had won.
- Sidney Powell, Trump campaign lawyer, seven felony charges. On October 19, 2023, Powell pled guilty to six misdemeanor counts in the case. She had been accused of: making false statements that the election results were fraudulent; contracting SullivanStrickler to collect and analyze data from Dominion Voting Systems equipment in multiple states, ultimately leading to the "unlawful breach of election equipment in Coffee County, Georgia".
- Jenna Ellis, Trump campaign lawyer, two felonies. Accused of soliciting Georgia state senators to violate their oaths of office "by unlawfully appointing presidential electors from the State of Georgia." She pled guilty on October 24, 2023.
- Scott Graham Hall, bail bondsman, seven felonies. Allegations included: "looking into the election on behalf of [Trump]". He has been described in the press as being "at the center of the breach of election equipment in Coffee County". He was the first to plead guilty on September 29. He pled guilty to five misdemeanors.

== Remaining defendants ==
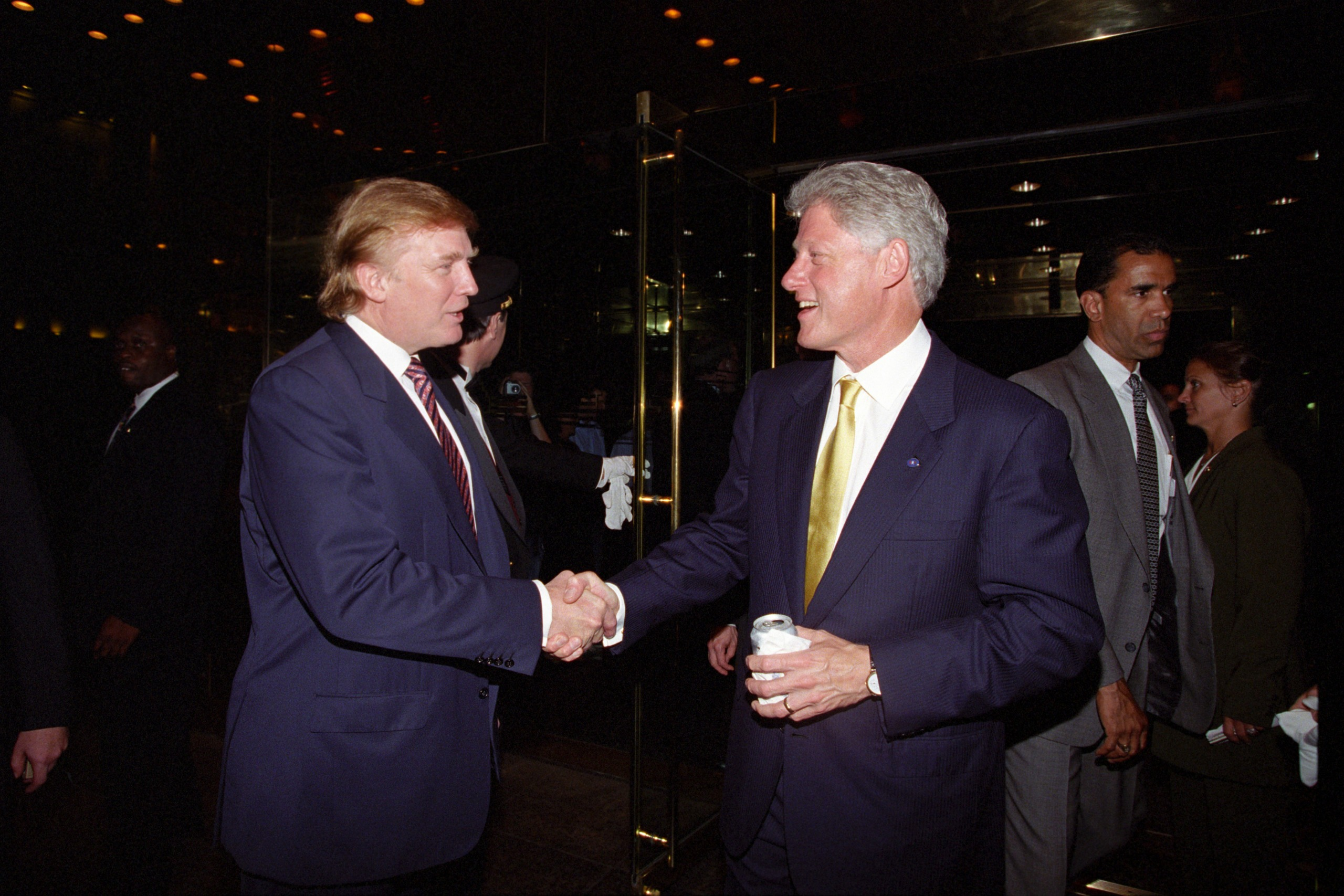
Donald Trump and Bill Clinton, the most recent president to be subject to potential prosecution until a 2001 non-prosecution deal.

The 15 remaining defendants in the indictment and some of the allegations against them are:

- Donald Trump, former then incumbent U.S. president, 13 felonies. Alleged organizer and leader of a criminal enterprise which attempted to fraudulently overturn the results of presidential elections in Georgia and six other states.
- Rudy Giuliani, Trump lawyer, 13 felonies. Accused of "overt acts in furtherance of the conspiracy", including falsely telling a Georgia Senate Judiciary Committee that 10,315 dead persons and 2,560 convicted felons cast votes.
- John Eastman, Trump lawyer, 9 felonies. Accusations include: making false statements in a court filing; helping assemble "unlawful" pro-Trump electors.
- Mark Meadows, Trump's final White House chief of staff, two felonies. Accusations include soliciting a public officer to violate their oath during the Raffensperger call, telling him, "I can promise you there are more than that", in reference to the state having found only two votes cast by felons.
- Jeffrey Clark, acting assistant attorney general for the U.S. Justice Department's civil division, two felonies including, "criminal intent to commit false statements and writings". Allegedly "solicited Acting United States Attorney General Jeffrey Rosen and Acting United States Deputy Attorney General Richard Donoghue to sign and send "a letter he had drafted to the state Legislature of Georgia, which falsely claimed the DOJ had "identified significant concerns that may have impacted the outcome of the election in multiple States, including the State of Georgia." The request was rejected and the letter was not sent.
- Ray Smith III, Trump campaign attorney, 12 felonies. Accused of: soliciting Georgia state senators to violate their oaths of office "by unlawfully appointing presidential electors from the State of Georgia"; on December 14, 2020, encouraging Trump elector nominees to sign a "Certificate of the Votes of the 2020 Electors from Georgia", despite Trump having lost the election.
- Bob Cheeley, lawyer, 10 felonies. Allegedly participated in the December 14 fraudulent vote certification meeting. Also accused of perjury before a grand jury for testimony related to the same meeting.
- Mike Roman, Trump campaign director, seven felonies. Allegedly he "instructed individuals associated with the Trump Campaign to populate entries on a shared spreadsheet listing Trump presidential elector nominees in Georgia, Arizona, Michigan, Nevada, Pennsylvania, and Wisconsin."
- David Shafer, former Georgia GOP chair and fake elector, eight felonies. Presided over December 14 electoral vote meeting. Accused of wrongfully casting his vote for Trump, and signing the fraudulent electoral vote certificate.
- Shawn Still, fake elector, seven felonies. Accused of "impersonating a public officer" by posing as a "qualified presidential elector" at December 14 meeting.

The following are mainly indicted for attempting to influence a Fulton County election worker:

- Steve Lee, pastor from Illinois, five felonies. Accused of going to the residence of Fulton County election worker Ruby Freeman "with intent to influence her testimony in an official proceeding in Fulton County".
- Harrison Floyd, Black Voices for Trump leader, three felonies, including attempting to influence witnesses. The indictment alleges that Lee asked Floyd to help him speak with Freeman, a black woman, because she was afraid to talk to "a white man". Floyd allegedly told Freeman "that she needed protection and purported to offer her help."
- Trevian Kutti, publicist from Chicago, three felonies. Allegedly participated in the attempts to influence Freeman's testimony. She is accused of: visiting Freeman's home, falsely telling a neighbor that "she was a crisis manager attempting to 'help' Freeman"; meeting with Freeman at the Cobb County PD for over an hour, again under the pretense of offering help; asking Freeman to give false testimony.

The following are mainly indicted for breaching Coffee County election equipment:

- Cathy Latham, former Coffee County GOP leader and fake elector, 11 felonies. Accused of: "felony computer trespass" and "computer invasion of privacy" for breaching Coffee County election equipment to copy their data.
- Misty Hampton (a.k.a. Emily Misty Hayes), then the Coffee County elections supervisor, seven felonies. According to the Washington Post, shortly after the election, she produced a viral video allegedly documenting vulnerabilities in Dominion Voting Systems equipment. She told the Post that Hall and the other defendants had not gone into a room containing touch-screen voting machines, but had no knowledge of whether they had been in the server room containing the computer that tabulates ballots. She is accused of "willfully and unlawfully tampering with electronic ballot markers and tabulating machines" and "unlawful possession of ballots," along with Latham, Hall, and Powell.

There is overlap with the co-conspirators mentioned in the federal indictment of Trump issued two weeks earlier. In the federal indictment, Giuliani was listed as co-conspirator No. #1, Eastman was #2, Powell was #3, Clark was #4, and Chesebro was #5. All five of these people, though not charged in the federal prosecution, are charged as co-defendants in the Georgia prosecution. (Co-conspirator No. #6 in the federal indictment has not yet been conclusively identified by the public.)

== Unindicted co-conspirators ==
The indictment references 30 "unindicted co-conspirators" who allegedly participated in some of the same criminal activities with the 19 defendants. These 30 people are not named in the indictment, but referred to by number. CNN, Just Security, The Washington Post and The Atlanta Journal-Constitution independently cross-referenced details in the indictment with already public information which does name the involved individuals, allowing many of them to be identified.

- 1. Tom Fitton of Judicial Watch. According to the January 6 committee, he discussed a draft of Trump's November 4, 2020, speech, "falsely declaring victory in the 2020 presidential election" four days previously.
- 2. Unknown. Fake elector. See 12–19 below.
- 3. Boris Epshteyn, Trump political adviser, member of Giuliani's legal team. Allegedly included in two email exchanges with Eastman and Chesebro, one of which was a draft memo for actions to take on January 6.
- 4. Robert Sinners, Georgia election day operations lead for Trump. In October 2022, it was reported that Sinners had renounced Trump's election conspiracies after listening to the recorded Raffensperger call and had been hired as Raffensperger's communications director to help build up trust in the 2022 midterm elections.
- 5. Bernard Kerik, former NYPD Commissioner. Allegedly, he: participated in meetings with legislators in Pennsylvania and Arizona; received an email on December 8, copied to Giuliani, from a Republican activist, Bill White, containing the contact information for Georgia Senate leaders. CNN confirmed with Kerik's attorney, Tim Parlatore, that he is the person so-identified. Kerik died on May 29, 2025
- 6. Phil Waldron, GOP political operative. He allegedly: participated in a White House meeting with Trump, Meadows, Giuliani, and Ellis to ask a group of Pennsylvania lawmakers to appoint Trump electors; was among three people to receive data from Michigan's Dominion Systems voting equipment; also discussed investigations of voter fraud in Arizona and Georgia.
- 7. Unknown. Allegedly one of several people working with Roman, who contacted Georgia state legislators to appoint fake electors.
- 8. Burt Jones, current Lt. Governor of Georgia, then a state senator, fake elector. Identified by a December 7, 2020, tweet quoted in the indictment calling for Georgia voters to demand that "every legal vote is counted", which Giuliani re-tweeted. The indictment mentions Jones over a dozen times, including the allegation of being a fake elector. The executive director of the Prosecuting Attorneys Council of Georgia, Pete Skandalakis, intends to appoint a special prosecutor to investigate Jones. In 2022, a judge prevented Willis from investigating Jones.
- 9. Joseph Brannan, then Georgia Republican Party Treasurer, fake elector. Allegedly received an email from Chesebro "to help coordinate with the other 5 contested States", and several other emails related to prepare for the fake electors meeting on December 14, 2020.
- 10 and 11. Carolyn Hall Fisher and Vikki Consiglio, respectively assistant treasurer and first vice chairperson for the Georgia GOP. They allegedly: received an email from Chesebro, copied to Shafer and Brannan, containing the documents used to create fake elector certificates; served as fake Georgia electors.
- 12–19. Fake electors. Individual 12 allegedly discussed the plan to cast bogus electoral votes two days prior to the December 14 meeting. Of the 16 fake electors, three were indicted, the nine remaining ones are unnamed in the charging document, but are numbered 2 and 12–19, accounting for all nine. Publicly available information has not conclusively tied them to a specific unindicted co-conspirator.
  - Mark Amick: member of the Georgia Republican Foundation board of governors, and unsuccessful candidate for Milton city council in 2019. Was a poll-watcher during the 2020 election and later testified that during the first recount he had witnessed more than 9,000 votes erroneously assigned to Biden.
  - James "Ken" Carroll: assistant secretary for the Georgia GOP during the election. Previously served in other roles for the party.
  - Brad Carver: attorney, Republican National Lawyers Association member, practices law related to energy, environment and utilities.
  - John Downey: Cobb County GOP district chair.
  - Gloria Kay Godwin: local GOP leader in Blackshear. Co-founded Georgia Conservatives in Action.
  - David G. Hanna: co-founder of Atlanticus Holdings Corp., and its CEO until March 2021.
  - Mark W. Hennessy: appointee to the Georgia Board of Natural Resources and CEO of several Atlanta car dealerships.
  - Daryl Moody: attorney, Georgia Republican Foundation chair, and GOP donor.
  - C. B. Yadav: Camden County business owner, Georgians First Commission member, campaign volunteer for Brian Kemp's run for governor.
- 20. Not conclusively identified by either CNN or Just Security, therefore not named here. They both agree on two possibles, and Just Security proposes a third. This person allegedly attended a meeting on December 18, 2020, with Trump, Giuliani and Powell at the White House to discuss plans for overturning the election results.
- 21–22. Conan Hayes and Todd Sanders. Associated with a conservative advocacy group called Byrne's America Project, which donated funds to the Arizona ballot "audit". In a December 21, 2020 email, Powell allegedly instructed the COO of SullivanStrickler, Paul Maggio, to immediately send Individual 6 (Waldron) and Individuals 21 and 22 copies of data obtained from Dominion voting machines in Wayne County, Michigan.
- 23. Unknown. Allegedly involved with the Coffee County voting data breach along with Individuals 24–30, who have all been identified via public records. The indictment indicates that 23 also received a phone call from Floyd on January 3, 2021, in relation to the harassment of Freeman.
- 24. Alex Cruce. Allegedly flew to Coffee County with Hall to meet with election officials, and assisted with the election data breach there.
- 25 and 29. Doug Logan, Cyber Ninjas CEO; Jeffrey Lenberg, Cyber Ninjas analyst. Hampton allegedly granted them both access to restricted areas in the Coffee County elections office on January 18, 2021, as seen on surveillance video obtained by CNN. Logan also led Cyber Ninja's "audit" of Maricopa County, Arizona's 2020 ballots.
- 26. Todd Sanders. Allegedly downloaded Coffee County election data from SullivanStrickler.
- 27. Conan Hayes. Also listed as unindicted co-conspirator 21. Allegedly downloaded Coffee County voting data from SullivanStrickler.
- 28. Jim Penrose. Allegedly emailed Maggio and requested that he send Coffee County election data to Powell and Lambert. A former employee of the National Security Agency.
- 30. Stefanie Lambert. Pro-Trump lawyer from Michigan. Named in an email from Penrose asking SullivanStrickler to send her Coffee County election data. In early August 2023, she was charged with four Michigan state felony counts related to unauthorized access to voting machines and their data.

== Special grand jury recommendations ==
The special grand jury recommended 39 people be charged, of which only 19 were actually charged in the indictment. Many of the others have been identified as unindicted co-conspirators: Epshteyn (3), Jones (8), Brannan (9), Consiglio and Fisher (10 and 11), Amick, Carver, Downey, Godwin, Hennessy, and Yadav (2 and 12–19).

The following ten people were recommended to be charged by the grand jury, but were not charged and have not been identified as unindicted co-conspirators above. However, it is possible that each might be an unindicted co-conspirator who is not identified above.

- Jacki Pick
- Lin Wood
- Michael Flynn
- William Ligon
- Cleta Mitchell
- Kurt Hilbert
- Sen. David Perdue
- Alex Kaufman
- Sen. Kelly Loeffler
- Sen. Lindsey Graham
