= 2020 Georgia election investigation =

Investigation into Donald Trump and allies

In February 2021, Fulton County, Georgia, district attorney Fani Willis launched a criminal investigation into alleged efforts by then-president Donald Trump and his allies to overturn the certified 2020 election victory of Democratic candidate Joe Biden and award the state's Electoral College votes to Trump. A special grand jury recommended indictments in January 2023, followed by a grand jury that indicted Trump and 18 allies in August 2023. The charges include conspiracy, racketeering and other felonies.

The investigation scope includes Trump pressuring Brad Raffensperger, the Republican Georgia Secretary of State, in a recorded phone call to "find" sufficient ballots for him to win the state. After Biden's electoral victory was certified, Trump personal attorney Rudy Giuliani and others met with state legislators to provide specious allegations of election fraud to encourage the legislature to convene a special session to reconsider the election result. Sixteen Trump supporters convened to create fraudulent slates of Trump electors. Republican senator and ardent Trump supporter Lindsey Graham asked the secretary of state if he could discard legally-cast ballots.

Other attempts by Trump supporters to overturn the 2020 United States presidential election were investigated during the Biden administration by the Department of Justice and the Smith special counsel investigation.

In November 2025, the case was taken over from Willis by Peter Skandalakis, director of the Prosecuting Attorney's Council of Georgia, and shortly after dropped. "In my professional judgment, the citizens of Georgia are not served by pursuing this case in full for another five to ten years," Skandalakis wrote.

== Background ==
=== Accusations of electoral fraud ===
Throughout his 2016 presidential campaign, Trump repeatedly sowed doubt on the election certification process. Campaigning in Colorado, Trump claimed that the Democratic Party "[rigged] the election at polling booths". Trump claimed that widespread voter fraud had occurred in the 2016 presidential election in a series of tweets in October 2016. These statements were echoed by Rudy Giuliani, Trump's legal advisor.

=== Attempts to overturn the 2020 presidential election ===
Following Trump's defeat in the 2020 presidential election, an outside advisor to Trump known as Kenneth Chesebro began drafting a plot to purport Trump supporters as electors. Chesebro justified the plot using precedent set in the 1960 United States presidential election, by certifying a slate of electors declaring Trump the winner. Attempting to overturn the results of the election, Trump called Georgia governor Brian Kemp, asking him to convene Georgia's legislators to select electors that would support him in the election, and requested an audit of absentee ballots. Georgia certified the results of the election multiple times and reaffirmed Joe Biden's win in the state, including a final time on December 7, prior to the Electoral College vote a week later.

=== Trump–Raffensperger phone call ===
Trump called Brad Raffensperger, the Georgia Secretary of State, on January 2, 2021, and pressured him to alter the results of the 2020 presidential election in Georgia. Trump's call with Raffensperger was obtained by The Washington Post the following day.

== Investigation ==
Fani Willis, the district attorney for Fulton County, Georgia, began a criminal investigation into Trump's efforts to overturn the 2020 presidential election on February 10, 2021. Willis began interviewing election officials and staff working under Raffensperger in September 2021.

Willis hired three attorneys and appointed them as special prosecutors in the case. They were John Floyd, beginning April 1, 2021; Nathan Wade, beginning November 1, 2021 and ending with his resignation on March 15, 2024; and Anna Cross, beginning July 15, 2022.

Judge Scott F. McAfee had ruled that either Wade or Willis must resign after one of Trump's co-defendants surfaced information that they were in a romantic relationship. The Georgia Court of Appeals ruled later in 2024 that Willis must also be removed from the case. On November 14, 2025, Pete Skandalakis, executive director of the Prosecuting Attorneys' Council of Georgia, announced that he would appoint himself as prosecutor for the case. Had he not done so, McAfee would have dismissed the case for lack of a prosecutor.

=== 2022 special grand jury ===
Willis requested a special grand jury for her investigation into Trump on January 20, 2022. The Superior Court of Fulton County granted the request four days later. The special grand jury was authorized to write a report but not to indict anyone.

Transcripts and excerpts from the testimony of 61 witnesses are publicly available as of May 7, 2026, published by Lawfare. (It had previously been reported that about 75 witnesses testified.)

==== Subpoenas ====
Multiple subpoenas were issued on July 5, 2022. Some were sent to members of Trump's legal team, including Kenneth Chesebro, Cleta Michell, Rudy Giuliani, Jenna Ellis, and John Eastman. Giuliani was deposed on August 17, Ellis on August 25, and Eastman on August 31. Another went to former Capitol Hill counsel Jacki Pick Deason, but a Texas court said she did not have to testify.

U.S. Senator Lindsey Graham was also subpoenaed that day, and after the subpoena was upheld by a federal judge, an appeals court, and the U.S. Supreme Court, he was deposed on November 22. He testified (according to a 2024 book by journalists Michael Isikoff and Daniel Klaidman) that if you told Trump "that Martians came and stole the election, he'd probably believe you."

Later subpoenas included Georgia Governor Brian Kemp (subpoenaed August 4, deposed November 15) former White House Chief of Staff Mark Meadows (subpoenaed October 26, deposed), and former national security advisor Michael Flynn (subpoenaed November 15, deposed December 8).

Former Georgia Lieutenant Governor Geoff Duncan, Georgia Secretary of State Brad Raffensperger, Georgia attorney general Chris Carr, and former Georgia Speaker of the House David Ralston also testified.

==== December 2022 report ====
On December 15, 2022, the grand jury completed its report. On September 8, 2023, the report was released in full to the public, revealing that the grand jury had recommended charges against 39 people. (By the time this information was released, the district attorney had already charged 18 of them, plus one more the grand jury had not named.) The 21 people not charged included Republican Senator Lindsey Graham of South Carolina, who had been chair of the Senate Judiciary Committee when the election was certified; former GOP Senators David Perdue and Kelly Loeffler; and former national security adviser Michael Flynn. A previous partial public release had revealed the grand jury's conclusion that some of the 75 witnesses may have committed perjury. The partial and full releases were both by order of Fulton County Superior Court Judge Robert McBurney.

=== Allegation of defense attorneys misconduct ===
In April 2023, Willis alleged two attorneys representing ten Georgia Republicans under investigation for acting as fake electors of falsely representing they had informed their clients of immunity deals offered by investigators though they had not. Willis sought in a court filing to have one of the attorneys removed from the case. One Republican under investigation who was not represented by the two attorneys had accepted an immunity deal. One of the attorneys denied the allegation, while another was not available for comment.

=== Immunity agreements ===
At least eight of the sixteen Republicans who allegedly participated in the fake electors scheme had accepted immunity deals to cooperate with Willis by May 2023.

=== 2023 grand jury ===
After Willis hinted that an indictment might come during the first half of August 2023, another grand jury was seated on July 11, this one empowered to vote to bring charges against Trump.

External videos
- "Georgia DA Fani Willis News Conference on Trump Election Case Indictment", August 14, 2023, C-SPAN

==== Indictment ====
The indictment document

The grand jury indicted Trump and 18 allies on August 14. This followed a day of testimony by witnesses including former Georgia state senator Jen Jordan, former state representative Bee Nguyen, former Georgia Lieutenant Governor Geoff Duncan and independent journalist George Chidi. Gabe Sterling, a Georgia official for the Secretary of State, was also seen in the courthouse that day. The charges against Trump include racketeering and other felonies. Willis gave the 19 co-defendants the opportunity to voluntarily surrender no later than noon on Friday, August 25, 2023. Each defendant is charged with one count of violating the Georgia version of the federal Racketeer Influenced and Corrupt Organizations (RICO) Act and at least one other charge.

The co-defendants are:

1. Former U.S. President Donald Trump
2. Rudy Giuliani (attorney)
3. Former White House chief of staff Mark Meadows
4. Georgia State Sen. Shawn Still
5. John Eastman (attorney)
6. Sidney Powell (attorney)
7. Jenna Ellis (attorney)
8. Bob Cheeley (attorney)
9. Ray Smith III (attorney)
10. Kenneth Chesebro (attorney)
11. Former assistant U.S. attorney general Jeffrey Clark
12. GOP strategist Michael Roman
13. Former Coffee County elections supervisor Misty Hampton
14. Former Coffee County GOP chairwoman Cathy Latham
15. Atlanta bail bondsman Scott G. Hall
16. Publicist Trevian Kutti
17. Illinois pastor Steve Lee
18. Harrison Floyd, former candidate for a U.S. House seat and director of Black Voices for Trump
19. David Shafer, Georgia Republican Party chair and alleged fake elector

Trump and Giuliani face 13 counts each. The other defendants face fewer charges.

There is overlap with the co-conspirators mentioned in the federal indictment of Trump issued two weeks earlier. In the federal indictment, Giuliani was co-conspirator No. #1, Eastman was #2, Powell was #3, Clark was #4, and Chesebro was #5. All five of these people, though not charged in the federal prosecution, are charged as co-defendants in the Georgia prosecution. (Co-conspirator No. #6 in the federal indictment has not yet been conclusively identified by the public.) The indictment references thirty unidentified and unindicted co-conspirators.

When the indictment was unsealed, Fulton County District Attorney Fani Willis told reporters she would propose a trial date within the next six months and would seek to try all 19 co-defendants together.

=== Threats and security ===
At the end of July, Willis disclosed to county leaders a threatening email she had received, calling her a "corrupt nigger" and a "Jim Crow Democrat whore"; "I guess I am sending this as a reminder that you should stay alert over the month of August and stay safe," Willis wrote. In September, the Atlanta Journal-Constitution wrote that Willis "travels with an around-the-clock security detail at work and at her home, and last year gave her frontline staff bulletproof vests and keychains with panic buttons", it also noted that her family has been threatened.

On August 1, two weeks before the indictment, county sheriff Pat Labat said normal procedures, including mug shot and fingerprints, would be followed for Trump were he to be indicted.

=== Plea agreements ===
Guilty pleas:

- Bail bondsman Scott Hall, to five misdemeanor counts of conspiracy to commit intentional interference with performance of election duties, on September 29, 2023.
- Lawyer Sidney Powell, to six misdemeanors accusing her of conspiring to intentionally interfere with the performance of election duties, on October 19, 2023.
- Lawyer Kenneth Chesebro, to one felony, conspiracy to commit filing false documents, on October 20, 2023.
- Lawyer Jenna Ellis, to one felony, aiding and abetting false statements and writings, on October 24, 2023.

=== Other investigations ===
Georgia Lieutenant governor Burt Jones was one of thirty unidentified and unindicted co-conspirators referenced in the Willis indictment. Jones was a state senator in 2020 and allegedly played a prominent role in seeking to replace official electors with Trump electors. After reviewing the Willis indictment, Pete Skandalakis, executive director of the Prosecuting Attorneys Council of Georgia, said he planned to appoint a special prosecutor to examine Jones's activities.

== Responses ==
=== Trump's response ===
The President participated in two perfect phone calls regarding election integrity in Georgia, which he is entitled to do—in fact, as President, it was President Trump's Constitutional duty to ensure election safety, security, and integrity.

— Trump spokesperson Steven Cheung

Upon the February 2023 release of excerpts of the special grand jury report, Trump spokesperson Steven Cheung defended Trump and the phone call made between Trump and Raffensperger.

On July 14, Trump attorneys petitioned two courts to end the investigation. The Georgia Supreme Court unanimously rejected this petition the next business day, and Fulton County Superior Court Judge Robert McBurney also rejected it on July 31. Trump's team had asked to throw out evidence obtained by the special grand jury, ban prosecutors from presenting evidence to the charging grand jury and disqualify Willis from any related proceedings, alleging Trump would suffer "a violation of his fundamental constitutional rights" as he sought the Republican presidential nomination.

=== Other responses ===
In February 2023, Timothy J. Heaphy, the top investigator on the January 6 House select committee, said he expected "indictments both in Georgia and at the federal level."

In May 2023, Georgia Republicans enacted a law that created a commission empowered to discipline or remove state prosecutors who were alleged to have violated their duties. As he signed the bill creating the commission, governor Brian Kemp said it would curb "far-left prosecutors" who are "making our communities less safe." State senator Chad Dixon announced in August that he would file a complaint against Willis when the commission commenced in October, alleging she had weaponized the justice system against political opponents with an "unabashed goal to become some sort of leftist celebrity."

On July 18, 2023, after the grand jury was seated, attorneys for David Shafer wrote to Willis arguing that Shafer's action was protected under the First, Fifth and Fourteenth Amendments. Willis had already identified Shafer as a target of the investigation.
