= Douglass High School (Atlanta) =

Public school located in Atlanta, Georgia, United States

Frederick Douglass High School

Location
- Atlanta, Georgia; United States
- 33°45′40″N 84°28′05″W

Information
- Type: Public
- Motto: "If there is no struggle, there is no progress."
- Established: 1968
- School district: Atlanta Public Schools
- CEEB code: 1110164
- Principal: Ms. Forrestella Taylor
- Staff: 89.60 (FTE)
- Grades: 9–12
- Enrollment: 1,194 (2023–2024)
- Student to teacher ratio: 13.33
- Campus: Urban
- Colors: Black and old gold
- Mascot: Astros
- Nickname: Doug
- Newspaper: The North Star
- Yearbook: Polaris
- Georgia School of Excellence: 1983-84 National Blue Ribbon School U.S. Department of Education National Blue Ribbon Schools Program
- Website: Douglass High School

Frederick Douglass High School is a public school located in northwest Atlanta, Georgia, United States, bordering the Collier Heights and Center Hill communities.

== History ==
Since 1968, Frederick Douglass High School has served the communities of historic Collier Heights, Peyton Forest, Cascade Heights, Center Hill, and the city of Atlanta. Atlanta Public Schools established Douglass High School to relieve overcrowding at nearby Harper, Turner and West Fulton High Schools. All three of these (as well as the defunct Archer High School) eventually merged with Douglass.

From 2002 to 2004 the school was renovated to update the main building and to add a gymnasium and an auditorium. These buildings honor former principals Lester W. Butts and Samuel L. Hill. In 2009, Frederick Douglass High School was listed in the National Historic Registry as one of the buildings in "The Collier Heights Historic District: Atlanta's Premier African American Suburb".

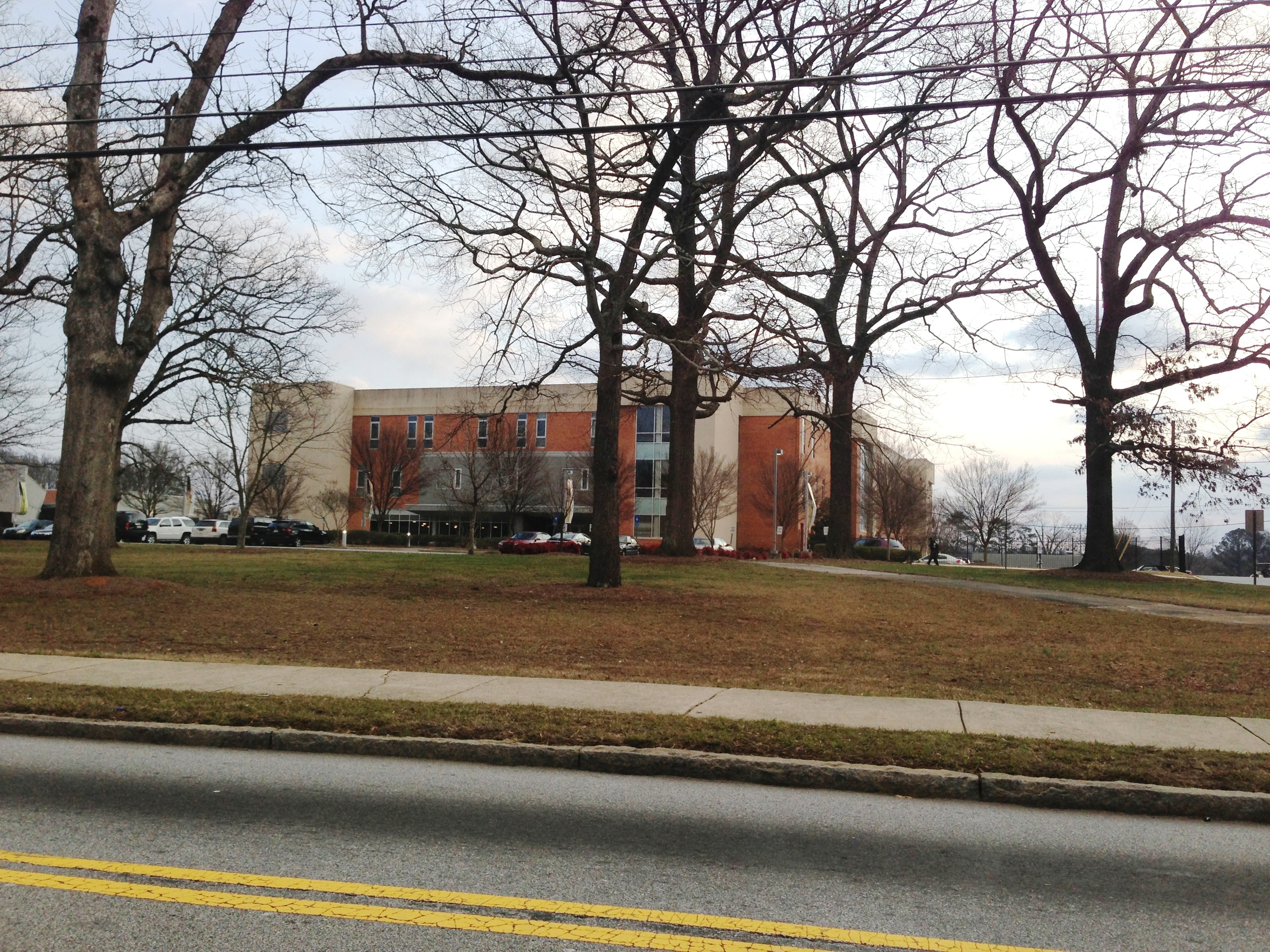
Front entrance

== Academics ==
Douglass High School is made up of several small learning communities:

- CFEAT - Center for Engineering and Applied Technology
- C&J - Communications and Journalism
- HTM - Center for Hospitality, Tourism, and Marketing
- B&E - Center for Business and Entrepreneurship
- 9th Grade STEAM Academy

=== Feeder patterns ===
Elementary schools feeding Douglass are Harper-Archer Elementary, Usher-Collier Elementary, Scott Elementary, Boyd Elementary, FL Stanton Elementary, Woodson Park Academy, and John Lewis Invictus Academy Middle Schools.

== Student activities ==
=== Athletics ===
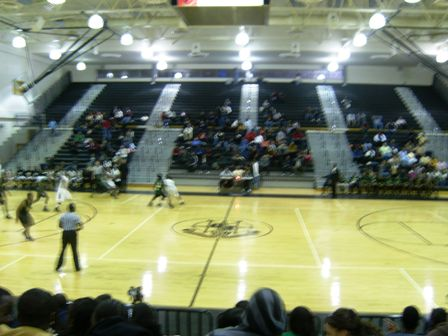
Inside the gymnasium

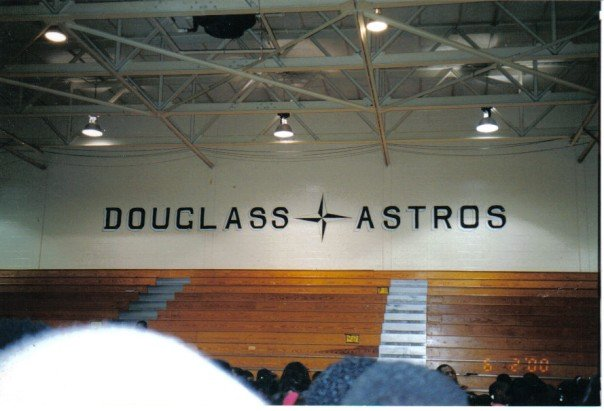
Inside the old gymnasium

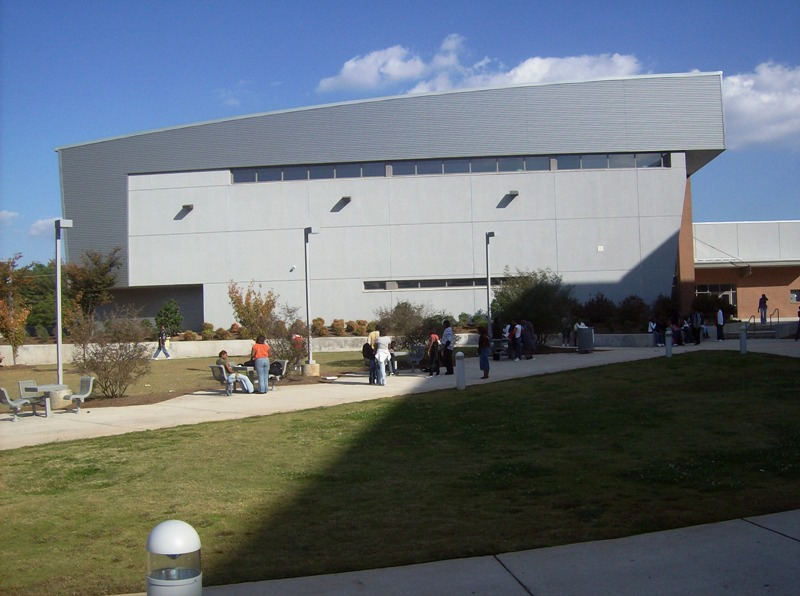
Outside the new gymnasium

Douglass High School competes in the Georgia High School Association Region 6, the state's second-highest classification of 4A. The school's team are known as the Astros, and its colours are black and gold.

The sports available for the competition are softball, varsity and junior varsity football, girls flag football, swimming, wrestling, tennis, cross country, varsity and junior varsity girls' and boys' basketball, track and field, boys' and girls' soccer, golf, and air rifle. All home varsity football games are played at Lakewood Stadium.

The boys' basketball program has won the state championship once, in 1984. However, the team has reached the final four 17 times (1970, 1972, 1973, 1974, 1975, 1976, 1977, 1978, 1980, 1984, 1987, 1988, 1990, 1991, 1993, 1999, 2022), and has captured 27 regional championships (1970–1985, 1987–1991, 1993, 1994, 1999, 2008). They have played in the finals seven times (1972, 1973, 1974, 1975, 1976, 1984, 1991). Douglass' dominance was achieved under two coaches, Donald Dollar (1971–1991) and Jesse Bonner (1992–2000). The current coach is Darren Rogers Jr.

The girls' basketball team has reached the state final four three times. They have won the state championship twice in 2019 and 2020. Both achieved under coach Alana Allen. The current coach is Morgan Jennings.

The football team has reached the state finals once (1975), and has sent numerous athletes to college on scholarships. They have won five regional championships, in 1975, 1978, 1995, 1998 and 2004. The current coach is Stanley Prichett.

Douglass has three tennis courts to accommodate their varsity tennis team. Students are encouraged to join whether they are beginners or avid players.

The girls' track and field team won the state championship title in 1993 and the boys' track team won the state crown in 1994. The boys' track team also won the 4x400 state title and finished second in state in 2008.

=== Other championships ===
Since 1993, the school has been a participant in the Stock Market Game, sponsored by the Georgia Council on Economic Education. In spring 2000, it became the first and only predominantly black high school in the Atlanta Public School System to win the state championship. Team Coach and Sponsor Jill Dockett Beracki is a graduate of the high school. On May 7, 2010, Douglass' team, led by captain Brandon Dykes, won the National Championship sponsored by the SIFMA Foundation for Investor Education. The five-member team, Beracki, and Dr. Martin of the Georgia Council on Economic Education were flown to Washington, D.C. to attend an awards ceremony at the Capitol. They were honored by Congressman John Lewis. Beracki had taught at Douglass for 26 years.

=== Marching Astros ===
Douglass' Marching Astros Band has competed in the annual Original Battle of the Bands Showcase and in jamborees locally and out of state. They have been highly televised and voted the #1 band in the Atlanta Public School District in the 2017-18 season. They also appear in parades and perform at events including by invitation. V.H. Moody, the former band director, was the longest working band director in Atlanta Public Schools.

The band has made trips to Philadelphia, Nashville, Florida, Bermuda, Magic City Classic, the Florida Classic in Orlando, and to the nation's second largest St. Patrick's Day parade, in Savannah. They were invited to perform at the New England Patriots' halftime show and selected members performed at the Super Bowl XXXIII halftime show. The percussion section, known as DDD (Douglass Deadly Drummers), have been featured on television, opening show for nationally televised games, and performing for known celebrities and government officials. In 2005, DDD won the First City and Statewide Drumline Competition, first place in APS and third place in State, bringing home the first cash prize and trophy for a single performance. The Douglass Deadly Drummers won a drumline competition against Osborne High School on September 17, 2011.

In 2017 the band also received first place at the Annual High stepping nationals competition in North Carolina and also placed first in; Auxiliary, Music, And also Best drum major. They also marched in two Mardi Gras parades (Thoth & Rex) thanks to tuba section leader who reached out to artist and alumni Killer Mike, Lil Jon and T.I who all contributed funds and helped fundraise for the trip.

== Notable alumni ==
Name	Class year	Notability	References
Keisha Lance Bottoms	1987	60th Mayor of Atlanta. Assumed office in 2018.	
Ricky Byrdsong	1974	Former Northwestern University basketball coach; the Ricky Byrdsong Foundation was started after his death by his wife, Sherialyn Byrdsong	
Milton Campbell	1994	Track athlete, record holder for the indoor 4x400 meters relay	
Ahmad Carroll	2001	Green Bay Packers, Jacksonville Jaguars, Orlando Predators, and New York Jets cornerback	
James Davis	2005	Tailback for the Washington Redskins	
Harold Ellis	1988	Played for the Los Angeles Clippers and Denver Nuggets; Atlanta Hawks scout	
Sonny Emory	1980	Musician, composer, producer, and professor	
Jarvis Hayes	1999	New Jersey Nets, Detroit Pistons, Washington Wizards	
Robert Hicks	1993	Washington Redskins, Atlanta Falcons, Oakland Raiders, Buffalo Bills	
Killer Mike	1994	Rapper	
Kilo Ali	1991	Rapper	
Bernice King	1981	Attorney, author, orator, minister; daughter of Dr. King, Jr	
Dexter King	1979	Actor, documentary filmmaker and civil rights activist; second son of civil rights leader Dr. Martin Luther King Jr.	
Jamal Lewis	1997	Baltimore Ravens, Cleveland Browns	
Lil Jon	1988	Rapper and producer	
Finesse Mitchell	1990	Actor, Saturday Night Live, 2003-2006	
Chris Morris	1984	New Jersey Nets	
Bobby Olive	1987	Kansas City Chiefs, Indianapolis Colts, Hamilton Tiger-Cats, Buffalo Destroyers, Carolina Cobras, and Columbus Destroyers wide receiver	
Pill	2003	Rapper	
Stanley Pritchett	1992	Atlanta Falcons, Miami Dolphins	
Leslie C. Smith	1982	Major General, United States Army	
T.I.	NA	Rapper, actor	
Unk	2000	Rapper	
Wayne Williams	1976	Convicted murderer and suspected serial killer in The Atlanta Child Murders	
