= Kutti =

Kutti is a given name and a surname. Notable people with the name include:

- Kutti Revathi (born 1974), Indian lyricist, poet, activist and doctor
- Trevian Kutti (fl. 21st century), American publicist and lobbyist
