= Twelfth Congressional District Republican Committee v. Raffensperger =

Twelfth Congressional District Republican Committee v. Raffensperger was a lawsuit in the US filed in the United States District Court for the Southern District of Georgia on December 9, 2020. The case was brought by the Twelfth Congressional District's Republican Committee, along with individual voters and candidates for Presidential Elector, against Georgia Secretary of State Brad Raffensperger and members of the Georgia State Election Board. The case was dismissed on December 17, 2020.

== Background ==
The plaintiffs sought to invalidate certain rules and procedures related to absentee voting in the U.S. state of Georgia. Specifically, they challenged the use of drop boxes for the receipt of absentee ballots, the opening of absentee ballot envelopes before Election Day, and the guidance on absentee ballot signature review. The plaintiffs argued that these rules and procedures violated the First Amendment and the Equal Protection Clause of the Fourteenth Amendment to the United States Constitution by not requiring ID verification in the mail-in ballot process, not expertly checking signatures, and allowing ballot boxes to go unwatched.

== Lawsuit ==
The plaintiffs claimed that the new rules and procedures facilitated "ballot harvesting" and vote fraud, and that they were injured by the disparate treatment between in-person voters and absentee voters. They argued that the rules broke existing laws that the State Election Board was supposed to enforce

The defendants, on the other hand, maintained that the ballot drop-offs were monitored by cameras 24 hours a day and that counties were required to keep the video for at least 30 days following election certification.

== Outcome ==
The district court dismissed the case with prejudice on December 17, 2020. The court's decision came just weeks before the historic runoff election for Georgia's two U.S. Senate seats.

== See also ==
- 2020 Georgia election investigation
- Georgia election racketeering prosecution
