= Cathy Latham =

American Republican party executive from Georgia

Latham's booking photograph released by the Fulton County, Georgia, sheriff's office

Cathleen A. Latham is an American teacher and political activist. She has been a member of the Georgia Republican Party's executive committee and the former chairwoman of the Coffee County Republican Party. She is known for her involvement in the 2020 election interference case in the U.S. state of Georgia, where she was indicted along with former President Donald Trump and 17 others.

== Personal life and career ==
Latham is a Texas native who spent her career in education at Coffee High School in Georgia. She began her teaching career as an English teacher, but transitioned to teaching economics after a colleague's unexpected retirement. Latham taught economics full-time since 2006 and her students consistently achieve the highest scores in the district on state standardized tests.

In 2019, Latham was recognized as the Georgia Economics Teacher of the Year by the Georgia Council on Economic Education (GCEE). She was active with GCEE, participating in their workshops for over 10 years, serving on some of their sister organization boards, and taking her students to the first annual Personal Finance Challenge in Atlanta.

Latham has worked as an educational consultant for the Georgia Department of Education, where she was responsible for writing new Economic Standards and served as a workshop instructor for AP Economic Education. She holds a Bachelor of Science in English and History from Baylor University, and a Masters of Education from Troy University with a concentration in Government and Finance.

Latham is married. She has served as the under 80,000 Caucus Chair for the Georgia GOP, overseeing 129 rural counties of Georgia.

As of July 2026, she has served as the Texas State Director for Humans First, a conservative AI advocacy organization that supports safety controls for AI systems and local decision making for siting data centers.

== Involvement in 2020 election ==
During the 2020 elections in Georgia and their aftermath, Latham was a member of the Georgia Republican Party's executive committee and sat on its election confidence task force. She was one of the "fake electors" who signed unauthorized certificates in a bid to keep Trump in power after his 2020 election defeat.

=== 2020 absentee voting lawsuit ===
In December 2020, Latham was one of the plaintiffs in a lawsuit against Georgia Secretary of State Brad Raffensperger and members of the Georgia State Election Board. The lawsuit, filed by the 12th congressional district's Republican Committee, sought to invalidate certain rules related to absentee voting in Georgia. Latham, a member of the Republican Party who had been selected to appear as a member of the Republican presidential elector slate on the November 3 general election ballot, claimed that the rules facilitated ballot harvesting and vote fraud, and violated her rights as a voter who votes in person. The case was dismissed with prejudice by the district court. The lawsuit was part of a wave of legal actions stemming from the 2020 elections.

=== 2023 indictment for racketeering ===
In August 2023, Latham was indicted in Georgia for racketeering, over alleged efforts to overturn the results of the 2020 election. She was one of the false electors who met to cast their votes for then-President Donald Trump, something the Jan. 6 Committee proved was part of a larger failed conspiracy to replace the lawful electors for Biden in several key states, including Georgia, with Trump electors.

In a court filing that month, Latham requested the case be moved from state court to federal court, arguing she "possesses a right to remove" the criminal prosecution in the state "as an officer of the United States or a person acting under officers of the United States." On September 29, 2023, a federal court rejected the request. On October 6, 2023, the decision was appealed, and on October 24, 2024, the decision was upheld.

Donald Trump was re-elected president in 2024. In 2025, he pardoned all defendants in the racketeering case, including Latham. The pardon only extends to potential federal charges and not state charges.
