= Ahmad Carroll =

American football player (born 1983)

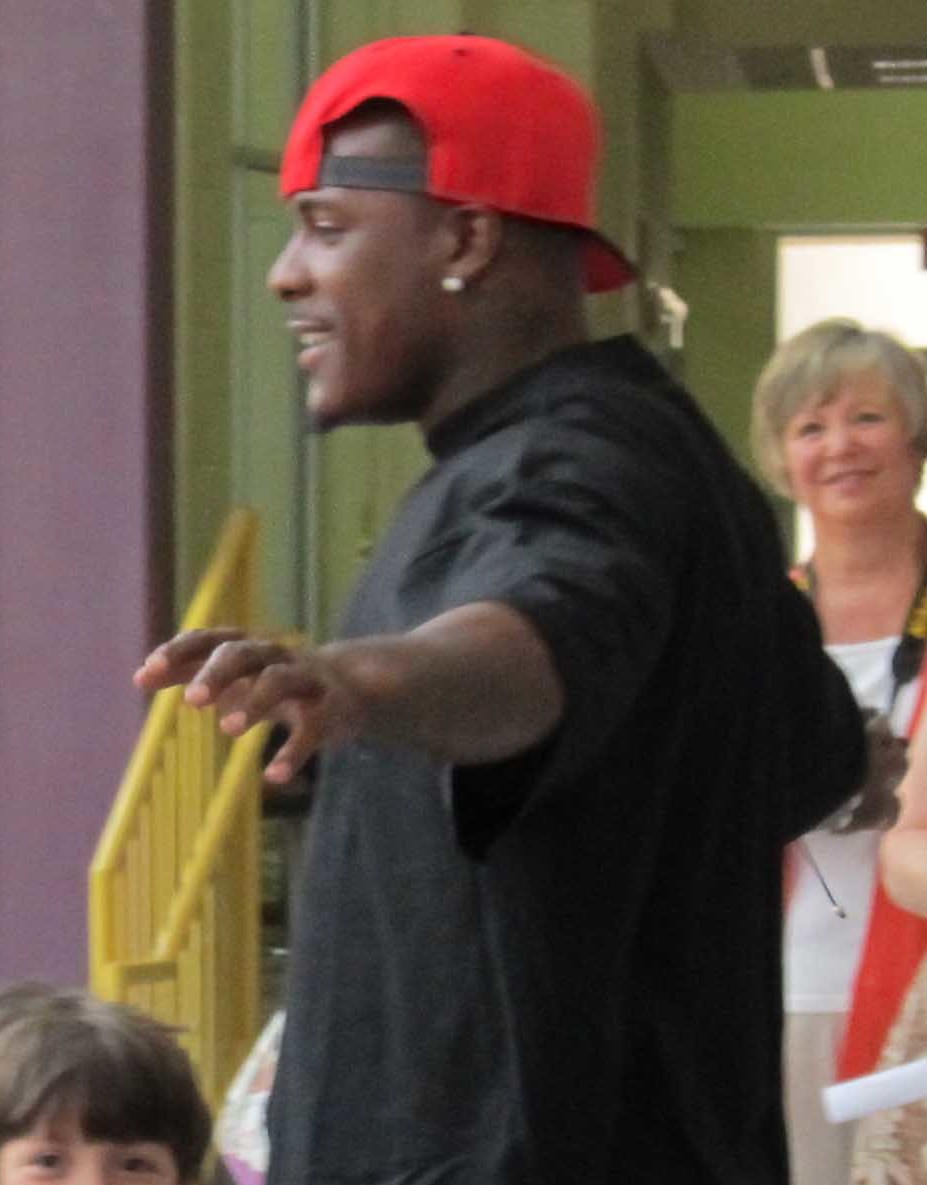
- Carroll in 2011

No. 28, 25, 31
- Position: Cornerback

Personal information
- Born: August 4, 1983 (age 43); Atlanta, Georgia, U.S.
- Listed height: 5 ft 10 in (1.78 m)
- Listed weight: 190 lb (86 kg)

Career information
- High school: Douglass (Atlanta, Georgia)
- College: Arkansas
- NFL draft: 2004: 1st round, 25th overall pick

Career history
- Green Bay Packers (2004–2006); Jacksonville Jaguars (2006); Orlando Predators (2008); New York Jets (2008–2009); Calgary Stampeders (2010); Hartford Colonials (2010)*; Virginia Destroyers (2011); Orlando Predators (2012); Arizona Rattlers (2012); Toronto Argonauts (2012)
- * Offseason or practice squad member only

Awards and highlights
- Grey Cup champion (2012); UFL champion (2011); First-team All-SEC (2003); Second-team All-SEC (2002)

Career NFL statistics
- Total tackles: 127
- Sacks: 3.0
- Forced fumbles: 2
- Pass deflections: 21
- Interceptions: 3
- Defensive touchdowns: 1
- Stats at Pro Football Reference
- Stats at ArenaFan.com

Ahmad Raheem Carroll (born August 4, 1983) is an American former professional football player who was a cornerback in the National Football League (NFL). He played college football for the Arkansas Razorbacks and was selected by the Green Bay Packers in the first round of the 2004 NFL draft.

Carroll was also a member of the Jacksonville Jaguars, Orlando Predators, New York Jets, Calgary Stampeders, Hartford Colonials, Virginia Destroyers, Arizona Rattlers and Toronto Argonauts.

== Early life ==
Ahmad Carroll was born August 4, 1983, to Artie and Carrolyn Carroll in Atlanta, Georgia. In his earlier years, Ahmad ran track for the D.C. Motion Track Club and also played Pop Warner football. During his years playing Pop Warner football, he earned the nickname "Batman" after repeatedly jumping over an offensive lineman. He later attended Frederick Douglass High School in Atlanta where he was an All-Area cornerback, as well as tailback. Tom Lemming's Prep Football Report rated Ahmad as the nation's No. 26 overall player, while Super Prep rated him as the second-best among all the nation's defensive backs. He was rated the best defensive back in the nation by Prep Star, while Rivals100.com called him the second-best cornerback in the nation. Blue Chip Illustrated rated Ahmad the second-best cornerback in the nation and the fourth-best overall player in Georgia. He was an ESPN/Reebok All-American selection as he recorded 70 tackles as a senior. He chose to accept a scholarship to the University of Arkansas.

== College career ==
Carroll excelled in two sports at the University of Arkansas as both a sprinter for the track team and a cornerback for the football team. He finished his college football career with the following statistics:

- 140 tackles (7 for losses)
- 25 passes defensed
- 4 interceptions
- 2 fumble recoveries
- 2 forced fumbles
- 12 quarterback hurries

== Track ==
=== High school ===
While at Frederick Douglass High School, Carroll ran track & field for the D.C. Motion Track Club. He set a state record in the 100m dash (10.41 seconds) and finished second in the 200-meter dash (21.24 seconds). He was also the national AAU champion in the 100m dash (10.38 seconds) and was selected to Georgia's Magnificent Seven list.

=== College ===
As an Arkansas collegiate, he competed on the Razorbacks' track team for two seasons. He earned a pair of All-American honors in the 100m and 200 meters at the 2003 NCAA Outdoor Track and Field Championships.

==== 2002 ====
In 2002, during the indoor season, Carroll competed in the 60-meter dash and set a new UA record with a provisional qualifying time of 6.69 seconds to win the event at the OU Sooner Invitational. He finished 11th (6.77s) at the SEC Indoor Championships. He also competed in the 100-meter dash during the outdoor season. He earned a provisional qualifying time of 10.34 seconds at the SEC Quad and finished third. At the SEC Outdoor Championships, Carroll ran a time of 10.50 seconds in the prelims and just missed advancing to the finals.

==== 2003 ====
In 2003, Carroll competed in the 60-meter dash during the indoor season. At the Tyson Invitational, he broke his own school record with a time of 6.67 seconds. He finished eighth in the event at the SEC Championships. At the NCAA Championships, he ran a time of 6.73 in the prelims, but was unable to advance to the finals. He ran in the 100 and 200-meter dashes during the outdoor season. He came in fourth (10.34s) in the 100 and third (20.94s) in the 200-meter dash at the SEC Championships. At the NCAA Mideast Regional Championships he registered a career-best time of 10.28 seconds in the prelims of the 100m and in the finals he crossed the line in seventh (10.33s). He went on to finish third (20.89s) in the 200-meter dash to earn an automatic berth to the NCAA Championships. He competed in a total of six races in four days at the NCAA Championships and became the first football letterman since Clyde Scott in 1948 to score points in an NCAA outdoor meet. He posted a seventh-place finish (10.46s) in the 100m and was the first Razorback athlete to score points in the 100-meter dash and only the second Razorback athlete to earn All-America honors in the event. He earned his second All-America honor for the weekend when he finished eighth in the 200-meter dash with a time of 21.48 seconds. He was the first Arkansas athlete to earn the honor in both the 100m and 200-meter dashes and was the only sprinter for the week to score points in both events.

== Professional career ==
Pre-draft measurables
Height	Weight	Arm length	Hand span	40-yard dash	10-yard split	20-yard split	Vertical jump	Broad jump	Bench press
5 ft 10 in (1.78 m)	195 lb (88 kg)	31 in (0.79 m)	9 3/4 in (0.25 m)	4.34 s	1.53 s	2.52 s	41 in (1.04 m)	10 ft 8 in (3.25 m)	15 reps
All values from NFL Combine and Pro Day

=== Green Bay Packers ===
Carroll was drafted by the Green Bay Packers in the first round (25th overall) of the 2004 NFL Draft. He was the target by many quarterbacks due to his tendency toward illegal contact penalties. Penalties finally got the best of him when in Week 4 of the 2006 season against the Philadelphia Eagles, Carroll was burned for two costly touchdowns by Greg Lewis and had three penalties. He was cut soon after.

=== Jacksonville Jaguars ===
In October 2006, Carroll was signed by the Jacksonville Jaguars. He was waived by the Jaguars on May 7, 2007, following an arrest.

=== Orlando Predators ===
Carroll played for the Orlando Predators of the Arena Football League in 2008.

=== New York Jets ===
Following the 2008 AFL season, Carroll was signed by the New York Jets. He tried out for the team in 2007 but did not sign a contract. He was re-signed by the team on March 16, 2009. Carroll was waived by the New York Jets on November 16, 2009.

=== Toronto Argonauts ===
On May 10, 2012, Carroll was signed by the Toronto Argonauts.

On June 30, 2012, Carroll played in his first CFL game against the Edmonton Eskimos. Midway through the third quarter, Carroll was flagged for defensive pass interference on a deep attempt by Eskimo quarterback Steven Jyles to receiver Fred Stamps. The penalty led to an Edmonton field goal, and Toronto went on to lose the game 19–15.

Carroll announced his retirement after winning the Grey Cup in 2012.
