= Steve Lee (chaplain) =

Defendant in Donald Trump RICO case

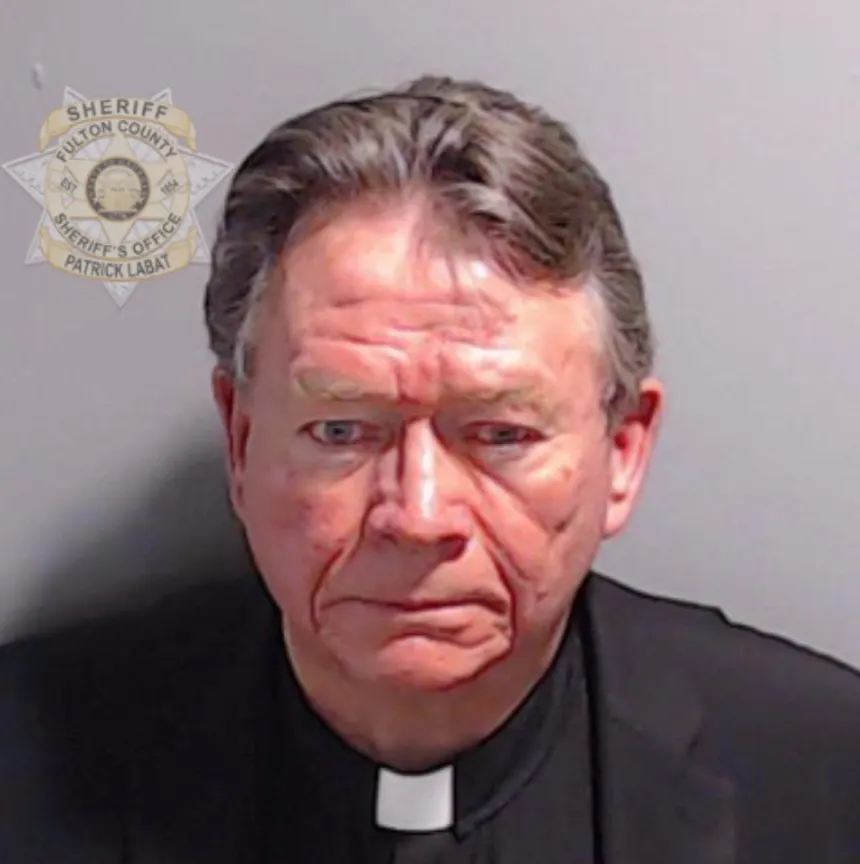
- Mug shot of Steve Lee, released by the Fulton County, Georgia, sheriff's office
- Education: West Valley College; Azusa Pacific University; Concordia Theological Seminary
- Occupations: Chaplain, police officer
- Children: 4

Stephen Cliffgard Lee is an American chaplain and former law enforcement officer who faced allegations he was involved in efforts to overturn the 2020 United States presidential election results in Georgia.

== Career ==
Lee worked as a police officer in California in the 1980s before becoming a chaplain and leading a crisis response team for law enforcement. From 1980 to 1987, he was a sergeant in the Mendocino County Sheriff's Office. He also worked as a special agent for the Naval Criminal Investigative Service. In 1996, he founded Peace Officer Ministries Inc., and was its executive director until 2010. From 2016 to 2018, Lee led a Lutheran church's Quick Response Team providing chaplain services to law enforcement.

Lee graduated from Concordia Theological Seminary in Fort Wayne, Indiana in 1992, and is an ordained pastor of the Lutheran Church–Missouri Synod (LCMS). As of 2023, he was retired (referred to within LCMS as being on "emeritus status").

In 2020, Lee was vacancy pastor for the Living Word Lutheran Church in Orland Park, Illinois.

=== 2020 presidential election indictment ===
After the 2020 U.S. presidential election, Lee visited the home of Georgia election worker Ruby Freeman. Freeman had been falsely accused of election fraud by allies of former President Donald Trump. Lee claimed he could help Freeman, but she declined his offer. Lee then contacted Trump campaign worker Harrison Floyd to arrange another meeting with Freeman, which resulted in Freeman being pressured to confess to false assertions of election fraud by Trevian Kutti.

In 2022, Lee became the second witness to avoid testifying before a Fulton County special grand jury investigating election interference. An Illinois judge denied the summons for Lee to appear before the grand jury, saying prosecutors had not provided enough evidence that Lee was a necessary witness. Prosecutors were given 30 days to file an amended court summons with additional information.

On August 14, 2023, Lee was indicted in Fulton County, Georgia, on charges of violating the Georgia state RICO act, two counts of criminal attempt to commit influencing of a witness, conspiracy to commit solicitation of false statements and writings, and influencing witnesses related to this incident.

On November 13, 2023, Lee said he would not take a plea deal. "I am not going to plead out to a lie, I'm not going to cooperate with evil. This is bigger than me."

== Personal life ==
Lee has been married to his wife Elaine since 1978. They have four children and six grandchildren.

== See also ==
- Attempts to overturn the 2020 United States presidential election
- 2020 Georgia election investigation
- List of alleged Georgia election racketeers
