= Jenna Ellis =

American lawyer (born 1984)

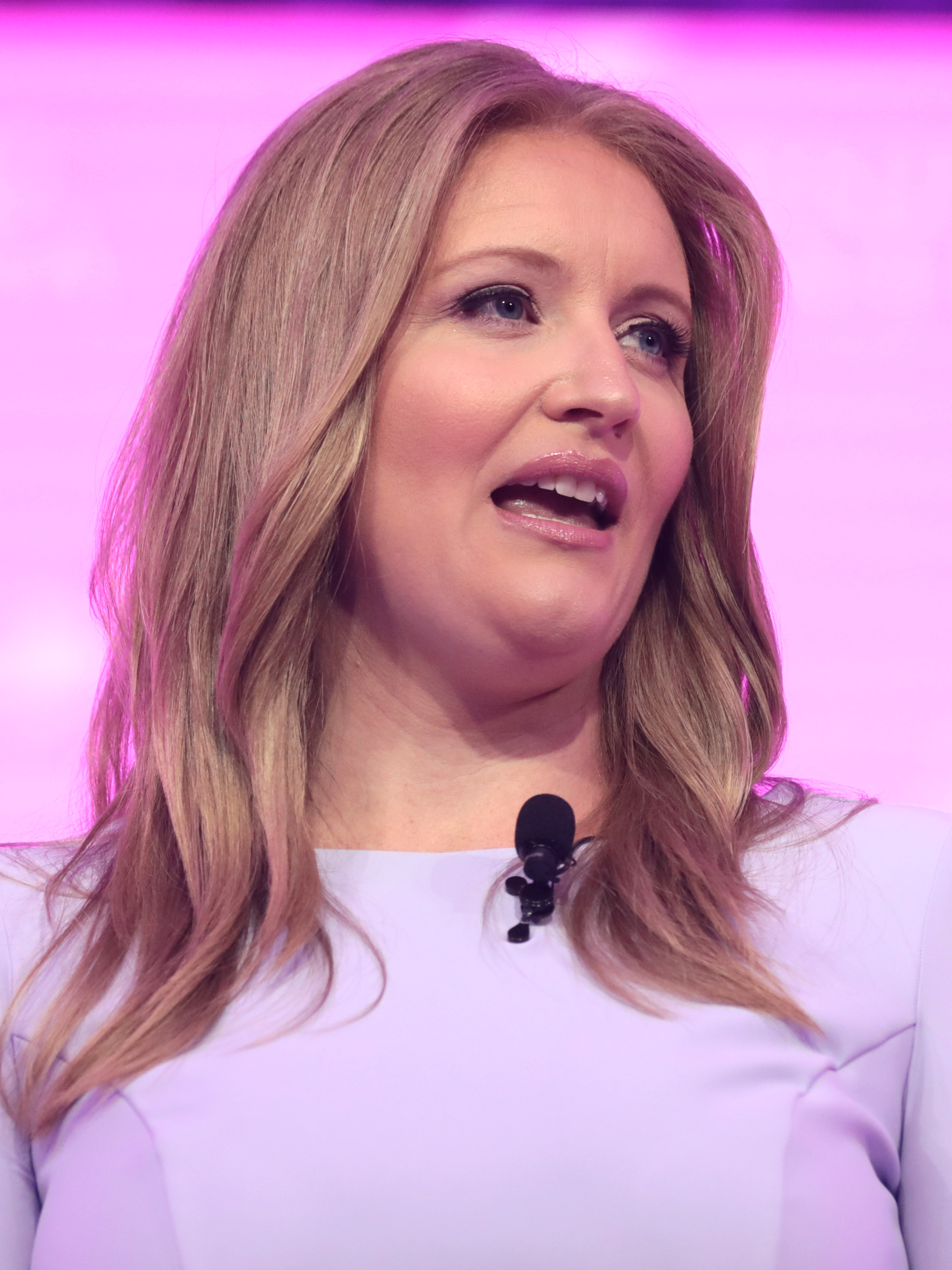
- Ellis in June 2021
- Born: November 1, 1984 (age 42)
- Education: Cedarville University; Colorado State University (BA); University of Richmond (JD)
- Known for: Legal advisor for Donald Trump's efforts to overturn the 2020 presidential election
- Political party: Republican (before 2021); Independent (2021–present)

Jenna Lynn Ellis (born November 1, 1984) is an American conservative suspended lawyer who was a member of Donald Trump's 2020 re-election campaign's legal team. She is a former deputy district attorney in Weld County, Colorado. During the Trump presidency, she falsely presented herself as a "constitutional law attorney" during cable news appearances, though The New York Times reported that her background did not reflect such expertise and The Wall Street Journal reported that she had no history in any federal cases.

Ellis was a critic of Donald Trump and his supporters in 2015 and early 2016 until he became the 2016 Republican nominee for president, at which point she began voicing support, including in media appearances. She was hired by Trump in November 2019 as a senior legal adviser. From November 2020 to January 2021, she was a member of what she characterized as an "elite strike force team" that made efforts to overturn Joe Biden's victory in the 2020 U.S. presidential election. She made claims that Trump was the actual winner of the election and drafted two memos asserting that vice president Mike Pence could change the results.

In March 2023, Ellis was publicly censured by the chief disciplinary judge of the Colorado Supreme Court for recklessly making 10 public misrepresentations, which she admitted to, about the 2020 presidential election, including the claims that Trump won the election and that the election was stolen from him. In August 2023, she and 18 others were indicted by a Fulton County grand jury in the Georgia election racketeering prosecution for allegedly participating in a criminal enterprise in furtherance of Trump's efforts to overturn the results of the presidential election. In October 2023, Ellis pleaded guilty to one felony count of aiding and abetting false statements in writing. In April 2024, Ellis was indicted by an Arizona grand jury for allegedly participating in attempts to overturn the 2020 presidential election in the state. On May 28, 2024, her Colorado law license was suspended for three years. In August 2024 Ellis agreed to cooperate with prosecutors in the Arizona elector case in a deal that allows her to avoid potential jail time.

== Early life and education ==
Ellis was homeschooled by her parents with a strong emphasis on civics. She, as well as one of her brothers, worked on a U.S. Senate campaign while in high school. She also interned for the Colorado lieutenant governor at age 14 and the Boulder County district attorney's office a few years later.

In 2003, Ellis enrolled at Cedarville University. While there, she received a "significant financial award" from a civil case related to her being a victim of a violent crime at age 16. She used the funds to set up a scholarship to benefit future Cedarville students. "I wanted the money to mean something more," said Ellis. "Starting a scholarship endowment was a way for me to heed that call to minister to others, and ultimately, further the Gospel of Christ through others' ministries." The Jenna Lynn Ellis Award is awarded each year to a junior or senior with a minimum 3.3 GPA and who wishes to pursue a career in law, with an emphasis on criminal prosecution and victim advocacy.

In 2004, Ellis transferred to Colorado State University in order to study journalism. In 2011, she received a Juris Doctor from the University of Richmond School of Law.

== Career ==
From 2012 to 2013, Ellis was a deputy district attorney in Weld County, Colorado. As a prosecutor, she worked on traffic offense matters and other low-level misdemeanors, including assault and theft, in state courts.

Ellis was fired as deputy district attorney after six months, which she attributed to her insistence that she would not prosecute a case she thought was unethical. Asked by The Wall Street Journal, the Weld County District Attorney's office declined to comment on the matter. The Colorado Sun published government records in December 2020 indicating Ellis had been fired for "mistakes", including a failure to "adhere" to Colorado's Victim Rights Act. Because the mistakes were attributed to "deficiencies in her education and experience" Ellis retained unemployment benefits. The report stated: "The number of cases in which (Ellis) committed an irreparable, egregious act was not significant compared to the total number of cases she processed. ... There are insufficient facts (Ellis) was not performing the duties to the best of her ability." The 2020 Trump campaign responded to The Colorado Sun on Ellis's behalf, stating that this was a "nonstory".

=== Private practice ===
After leaving the DA's office, Ellis went into private practice at law firms based in Northern Colorado. She defended clients in state courts in matters pertaining to assault, domestic abuse, prostitution, and theft. According to Ellis, she also worked in cases regarding immigration and tenancy. Records showed that Ellis took part in approximately 30 state court cases which began from 2012 or 2016, including one state appeals court case; this was described as a 'sparse record' by another Colorado lawyer interviewed by The Wall Street Journal. Ellis did not take part in election law cases or any federal cases before December 2020.

In 2013, Ellis worked for IE Discovery in one lawsuit involving a contract dispute. IE Discovery is a company that assists the U.S. Department of State in legal discovery matters. Ellis later falsely claimed to have been an "attorney for the U.S. Department of State"; she was not employed by the State Department.

In 2015, Ellis became an affiliate faculty member of Colorado Christian University, and later an assistant professor of legal studies, until her departure in 2018. Ellis taught political science and pre-law to undergraduates.

In 2017, Ellis became a writer for the Washington Examiner, where she falsely claimed to have a history of being a "professor of constitutional law". Colorado Christian University does not have a law school.

Ellis self-published a book, The Legal Basis for a Moral Constitution: A Guide for Christians to Understand America's Constitutional Crisis, in 2015. She argued that the Constitution of the United States must only be interpreted according to the Bible. Her view of the Supreme Court of the United States legalizing same-sex marriage, in Obergefell v. Hodges, was that it would lead to polygamy and pedophilia becoming accepted. In 2016, Ellis described homosexuals as "sinners" whose "conduct is vile and abominable". Robert Cochran Jr., an expert in Christian law, described Ellis' views as "further to the right" than most conservative Christian legal scholars.

=== Criticism of Trump ===
Between late 2015 and early 2016, Ellis was a critic of Donald Trump's efforts to become the presidential nominee for the Republican Party. In February 2016, Ellis said that Trump was not a real Christian because he did not seek forgiveness or repentance. She criticized Trump's attacks on the media and of his wish to tighten libel laws; when sharing a Washington Post article accusing him of seeking to destroy American democracy, she claimed that Trump was incapable of handling criticism and that this rendered him "insanely dangerous to the fundamental American value [...] of freedom of speech". In a later radio interview, she said that Trump's views on libel laws constituted "one of the greatest threats to our liberty" and proposed that the Republican Party set up a brokered convention to stop him from becoming the party's presidential nominee.

Ellis criticized Trump's supporters' arguments in support of him (calling their arguments "ridiculously illogical, inconsistent, and blatantly stupid") and that they neither cared "about facts or logic" nor were they "seeking truth", before going on to indirectly brand them as "narcissists". When sharing a meme about how Hillary Clinton's supporters did not care about her being an "unethical, corrupt, lying, criminal dirtbag", Ellis stated that this was also true of the relationship between Trump and his supporters and that the same logic applied.

=== Joining Trump ===
After Trump became the Republican nominee for president, Ellis abandoned her earlier opposition towards him and would later express support for him in the 2016 presidential election. When confronted in November 2020 over her earlier opposition to Trump and her subsequent change of opinion, Ellis, who was now a senior legal adviser for Trump's attempts to contest the result of the 2020 presidential election, stated that her previous criticisms of Trump were not a secret, that her earlier statements demonstrated that she thought for herself, and that she was straightforward about her opinions and whether or not these had changed over time. She then claimed that she had been "completely wrong about Trump back then", something that she was "glad to have learned", due to not having personally known him at the time, and that she had changed her opinion of him "based on fact and personal knowledge". Ellis said that she now saw Trump as "a sincere Christian, the best president in modern history", and as having "kept his promises to the American people", and described herself as being "proud to stand with him and his goals for the future of [the United States] and all of its citizens."

The New York Times reports that Ellis has made appearances on Denver radio shows as a legal commentator. In 2018, Ellis left Colorado Christian University to work for the James Dobson Family Institute, as director of its public policy division, the Dobson Policy Center.

By late 2018, Ellis was defending Trump in cable news appearances, as well as alleging bias in the FBI, presenting herself as a "constitutional law attorney". By 2019, Ellis had often been featured by Fox News as a guest.

In 2020, Ellis became the special counsel for the Thomas More Society, a conservative group that has filed 2020 election-related lawsuits via the Amistad Project organization. The Amistad Project cited Ellis as one of their "Leadership and Advisory Board" members. Ellis and the Thomas More Society said that Ellis is not working for Amistad. Ellis also stated that Amistad had cited her as a board member without her approval.

=== Legal advisor for Trump ===
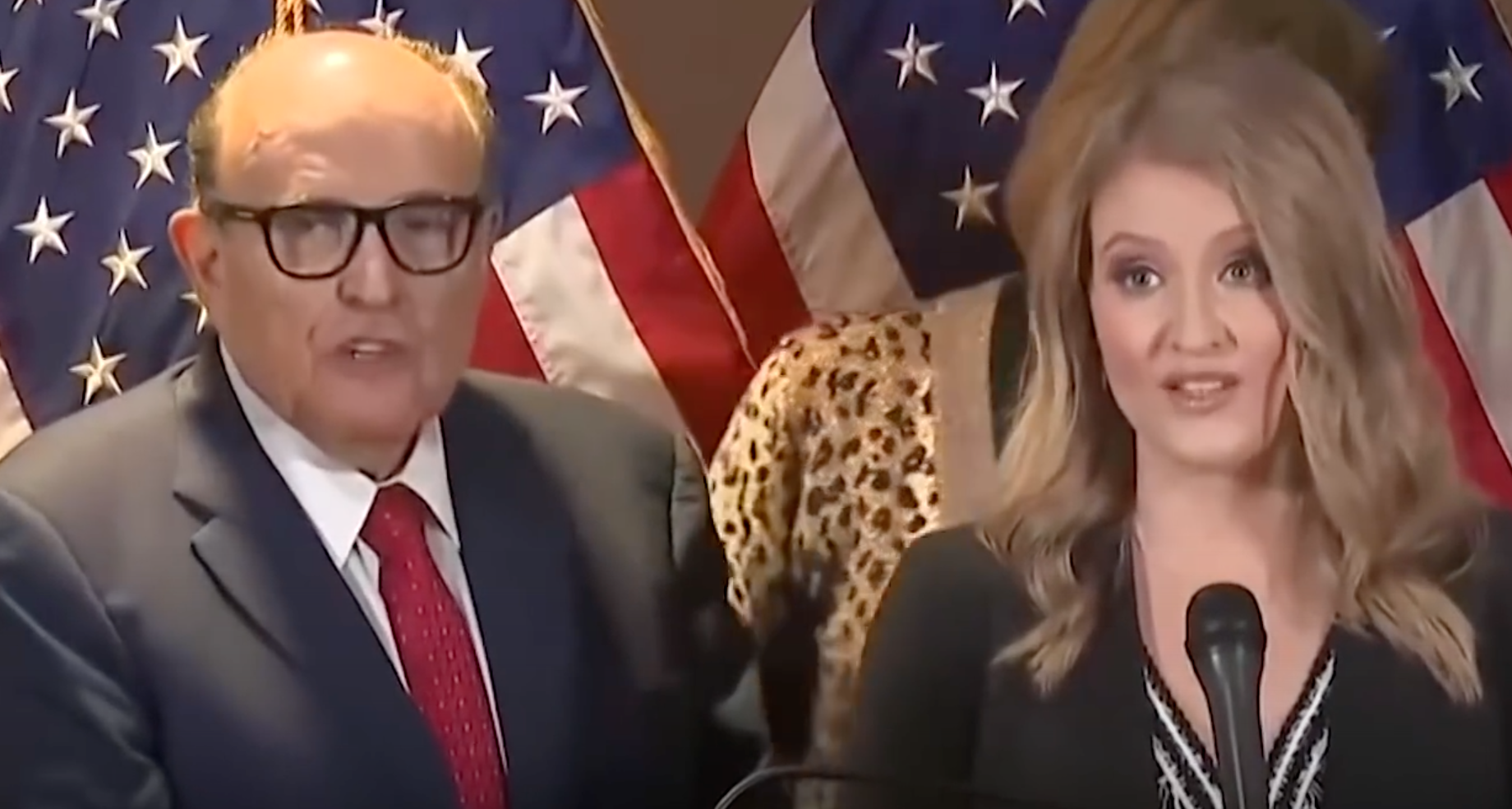
Ellis speaking with Rudy Giuliani

In November 2019, Ellis was hired as a senior legal adviser for Trump and his 2020 re-election campaign. Axios reported that Trump had discussed being swayed by Ellis' media appearances. The Trump campaign paid Ellis $3,900 in December 2019, then paid her almost $140,000 in October 2020 for legal consulting fees. Ellis was paid $30,000 in November 2020 by the campaign.

A Washington Post report narrated the following events: after all major news organizations projected Trump's Democratic opponent Joe Biden's victory on November 7, Trump's advisers and campaign staff were pessimistic about Trump's chances of prevailing. Trump's main lawyers were particularly discouraged by a November 13 defeat of Trump allies in the United States Court of Appeals for the Third Circuit (Bognet v. Boockvar) that decided that the plaintiffs had no standing to sue under the Constitution's electors clause in the Pennsylvania case. Ellis and Trump's personal lawyer Rudy Giuliani were far more optimistic about his prospects. The Washington Post report described Ellis as Giuliani's "protege".

=== Trump's attempt to overturn the 2020 presidential election ===
On November 14, Trump announced a legal team to challenge the legitimacy of the 2020 presidential election results for his campaign, naming Ellis as a member of the team, along with Joseph diGenova, Victoria Toensing, Sidney Powell, and team leader Giuliani. According to The Washington Post, after Trump's announcement, Ellis and Giuliani privately staged "a hostile takeover" of the Trump campaign from Trump's other advisers and campaign staff, resulting in Ellis, Giuliani and Powell gaining the foremost public roles regarding Trump's post-election efforts. On November 19, Ellis spoke at a press conference alongside Powell and Giuliani, with Giuliani stating that all three of them represent Trump and his campaign, and Ellis declaring that they were "an elite strike force team" assisting Trump. However, Powell soon left the team; Ellis and Giuliani stated on November 22 that Powell "is not a member of the Trump Legal Team", nor is she a personal lawyer for Trump.

During the November 19 press conference, Ellis declined to present evidence of fraud when asked to do so. Instead, she responded that asking for evidence at the press conference was "fundamentally flawed". She said that the Trump campaign would only provide "a preview of what we've discovered" at the press conference, while the actual evidence would be given to a court.

=== Michigan ===
In the midst of a case regarding Michigan, the Trump campaign requested permission to amend their complaint but erroneously signed the judge's name as if he had already permitted them. Ellis claimed that this was no error, but actually a "courtesy" to the judge so that he would only need to approve the amendment with the judge's seal. However, when the Trump campaign refiled the request, they removed the judge's name, indicating that their previous signing was indeed an error.

On December 2, Ellis and Giuliani met with Michigan's House Oversight Committee, where they urged the lawmakers to ignore the certified results of a Biden victory. Ellis personally urged the lawmakers to intervene in the election, however, Michigan law mandates that the state's electoral votes must go to the winner of the state's popular vote. Michigan's potential presidential electors had been chosen earlier that year, and Michigan lawmakers could not do anything at that point to appoint other presidential electors.

=== Pennsylvania ===
The Trump campaign's federal lawsuit regarding Pennsylvania was dismissed with prejudice with the judge citing "strained legal arguments without merit and speculative accusations" which were "unsupported by evidence". Ellis and Giuliani reacted by stating that the ruling "helps" the Trump campaign "get expeditiously to the U.S. Supreme Court". They also indicated that the judge, Matthew W. Brann, was "Obama-appointed", though Brann is also a Republican and a former member of the right-leaning Federalist Society.

The Trump campaign appealed the Pennsylvania lawsuit to the Third Circuit Court of Appeals, where a three-judge panel ruled that the Trump campaign "cannot win this lawsuit"; having provided neither "specific allegations" nor "proof", their "claims have no merit". Giuliani and Ellis reacted by condemning the "activist judicial machinery in Pennsylvania". Of the three Appeals Court judges, Stephanos Bibas (who wrote the panel's opinion) was appointed by Trump himself, while D. Brooks Smith and Michael Chagares were appointed by Republican president George W. Bush.

On November 23, even after the General Services Administration recognized Joe Biden as the apparent winner of the 2020 election, Ellis baselessly claimed that the "election was stolen and President Trump won by a landslide".

Also on November 25, Ellis and Giuliani appeared in front of the Pennsylvania Senate Majority Policy Committee. There, Ellis urged Pennsylvania lawmakers to fix a "corrupted, irredeemably compromised election" by either arranging for a new, "special election", or to "direct the manner of your electors", indicating that the lawmakers should not select presidential electors who would support Pennsylvania's popular vote winner (Joe Biden).

=== Arizona ===
On November 30, Ellis and Giuliani met with Arizona lawmakers, where they again urged for the popular vote result (Joe Biden's victory) in the state to be ignored, suggesting that lawmakers should not appoint pro-Biden presidential electors. The Arizona House Speaker rejected Ellis and Giuliani's request.

On December 1, 2020, the Trump administration's Attorney General, William Barr, stated that the Department of Justice and the Department of Homeland Security had investigated "systemic fraud", whether "machines were programmed essentially to skew the election results", and that "so far, we haven't seen anything to substantiate that". On whether fraud had cost Trump the election, Barr said he had not seen evidence of that yet. Ellis and Giuliani reacted by accusing the Department of Justice of failing to investigate fraud.

=== Georgia ===
On December 4, Ellis and Giuliani met state lawmakers in Georgia, making efforts to overturn the 2020 election result.

On December 8, 2020, Axios reported that Ellis had told associates that she tested positive for COVID-19. ABC News and CNN corroborated the story. However, Ellis refused to confirm the story to Axios. Giuliani confirmed Ellis' diagnosis later that day. Ellis had not worn a mask at a December 2 meeting with Michigan lawmakers and at a December 4 White House party, while on December 6, it was reported that Giuliani himself had tested positive for COVID-19. Meanwhile, in late November, Ellis and Giuliani ignored Centers for Disease Control and Prevention guidelines to quarantine themselves despite coming into close contact with a known infected COVID-19 case: Boris Epshteyn, a Trump campaign adviser.

=== Effort to overturn ===
On New Year's Eve 2020, White House chief of staff Mark Meadows sent a memo drafted by Ellis to a top Pence aide containing a detailed plan to overturn the election results. The plan entailed Pence returning the electoral results to six battleground states on January 6, with a deadline of January 15 for the states to return them. If any state did not return their electoral slate by that date, neither Trump nor Biden would hold a majority, so the election would be thrown to the House for a vote to determine the winner. Per the Constitution, in such a scenario the vote would be conducted based on state delegations made up of their respective House members with each state having one vote. With Republicans holding 26 of 50, that would presumably give Trump the victory.

Ellis drafted a second memo dated January 5 which she shared with Trump personal attorney, Jay Sekulow. The memo argued that certain provisions of the Electoral Count Act that restricted Pence's authority to accept or reject selected electors were unconstitutional. She proposed that when Pence reached Arizona in the alphabetical order during the certification, he could declare the state's results as disputed and send all the electoral slates back to the states for "the final ascertainment of electors to be completed before continuing". Sekulow did not agree that Pence had such authority.

=== Pleads the fifth ===
Ellis was subpoenaed in January 2022 to testify before the House Select Committee on the January 6 Attack. When called before the committee, she pleaded the Fifth Amendment privilege against self-incrimination. However, recordings of Ellis where she provided some details to the committee were presented during the committee's fourth public hearing on June 21, 2024.

=== After the Trump campaign ===
In April 2022, Ellis criticized the effort to repeal the Reedy Creek Improvement Act, calling it "misguided" and arguing that Disney has the "right to speak" and take a position on whether to support or oppose legislation "without government consequences."

In June 2022, Doug Mastriano appointed Ellis his senior legal adviser in his campaign for governor of Pennsylvania. At one of Mastriano's campaign events in Erie, Ellis called Mastriano the "Donald Trump of Pennsylvania". In October 2022, Ellis posted on Twitter that Mastriano's opponent "Josh Shapiro is at best a secular Jew in the same way Joe Biden is a secular Catholic — both are extremists for gender transition surgeries on minors and no limits on abortion. Doug Mastriano is for wholesome family values and freedom."

Following the Club Q shooting in November 2022, Ellis claimed that the shooting was being exploited to present a narrative where "Christians hate homosexual and transgender individuals and somehow that 'hate' led to the shooting", before going on to suggest that there was "no evidence at all" that the five people killed at Club Q were Christians and thus, "assuming that [...] they had not accepted the truth of the gospel of Christ and affirmed Jesus Christ as the lord of their life, they are now reaping the consequences of having eternal damnation [...] Instead of just the tragedy of what happened to the body, we need to be talking about what happened to the soul and the fact that they are now in eternal separation from our lord and savior Jesus Christ." She later rejected any claims of being hateful or judgmental towards the victims, but continued to insist on her assumption that they were not Christians and so were "eternally separated from Christ" as a result.

In September 2023, Ellis said on her radio show on the right-wing organization American Family Radio that she cannot support Donald Trump "for elected office again" due to his "malignant narcissistic tendency to simply say that he's never done anything wrong ... And the total idolatry that I'm seeing from some of the supporters that are unwilling to put the constitution and the country and the conservative principles above their love for a star is really troubling."

That December, Ellis commented in the online Calendargate controversy, criticizing Ultra Right Beer, a conservative-themed beer brand established in the aftermath of the 2023 Bud Light boycott, for featuring female conservative personalities such as Riley Gaines, Dana Loesch and Kim Klacik in pin-up poses in a promotional calendar. "This is the problem with conservatives who think they can act just like the secular world," she wrote. "If conservatives aren't morally grounded Christians, what are we even 'conserving'?"

=== Public censure ===
Ellis was publicly censured by Bryon M. Large, the chief disciplinary judge of the Colorado Supreme Court on March 8, 2023, for having "repeatedly made misrepresentations on national television and on Twitter, undermining the American public's confidence in the 2020 presidential election, violating her duty of candor to the public. The court ruling also stated that Ellis and regulators agreed that Ellis "had a selfish motive" and "engaged in a pattern of misconduct", and that Ellis admitted making 10 public misrepresentations in November 2020 and December 2020, including claims that "President Trump won in a landslide"; that "the election was stolen from President Trump" in the states of Nevada, Michigan, Pennsylvania, Wisconsin, and Georgia; and that there were over 500,000 illegal votes in the state of Arizona. Ellis paid a $224 fine as part of the censure.

According to Colorado's Office of Attorney Regulation Counsel, Ellis acknowledged that she violated the rule that prohibited "reckless, knowing or intentional misrepresentations by attorneys". The New York Times reported that Ellis admitted that she knowingly misrepresented facts, while Law360 reported that she admitted lying, but other outlets (Forbes, The Wall Street Journal, The Washington Post, and WITF-TV) gave a different account, reporting that Ellis admitted that she acted "with at least a reckless state of mind". The day after being censured, Ellis said that she had not lied and did not admit to lying, denying that she "intentionally" made false statements.

=== 2023 Fulton County, Georgia indictment ===
Fulton County indictment

On August 14, 2023, Ellis and 18 other people were indicted by a Fulton County, Georgia grand jury in the prosecution related to the 2020 United States presidential election in Georgia for allegedly participating in a criminal enterprise in furtherance of Donald Trump's efforts to overturn the results of the presidential election. Ellis turned herself in at the Fulton County jail on August 23, 2023.

It was noted in the media that her mugshot, in which she smiled broadly, was "noticeably different than other mugshots taken of Trump's alleged co-conspirators in Fulton County, with most photographed defendants appearing without any noticeably exuberant expressions." Shortly after authorities released the mugshot, Ellis shared the photo in a post to social media along with Matthew 5:44 and Psalm 32:10-11 from the Book of Psalms.

==== Guilty plea ====
Ellis' booking photograph released by the Fulton County, Georgia, sheriff's office

On October 24, 2023, Ellis pleaded guilty to one felony count of aiding and abetting false statements and writings, regarding her helping Giuliani and lawyer Ray Smith "knowingly, willfully and unlawfully" make false statements during a Georgia legislative hearing in December 2020.

The false statements included claims that the 2020 presidential election in Georgia included illegal votes from over 10,000 dead people, over 2,500 felons, and over 2,400 unregistered people. Ellis told the court that in "attempting to raise challenges to the election in several states ... I failed to do my due diligence", as she did not "make sure that the facts the other lawyers alleged to be true were, in fact, true." Under the terms of her guilty plea, Ellis was sentenced to five years of probation, pay $5,000 in restitution and perform 100 hours of community service. She also wrote an apology letter to the citizens of Georgia, and she agreed to cooperate fully with prosecutors against the other co-defendants.

=== Colorado disbarment ===
A few months later, in December, Ellis faced possible disbarment from the Colorado bar after two groups filed a complaint. On 28 May 2024, her Colorado law license was suspended for three years.

=== 2024 indictment ===
On 24 April 2024, Ellis was among 18 people indicted on charges involving the fake electors plot in the state of Arizona. Ellis was indicted as part of the legal team which advised Trump as he sought to overturn the 2020 presidential election results. On 18 June 2024, Ellis pled not guilty after appearing before the Maricopa County court remotely by video.

==== Cooperation agreement ====
On August 5, 2024, Ellis reached a cooperation agreement with Attorney General Kris Mayes, which she signed that day. As a result, all charges were dropped, and she must cooperate with the prosecution.

=== Presidential pardon ===
On November 9, 2025, Ellis was included in President Trump's pardon of those who backed his efforts to subvert the 2020 election. The pardon applies to federal charges; a president does not have the power to pardon anyone from state charges.

== Publications ==
- Ellis, Jenna (2015). The Legal Basis for a Moral Constitution: A Guide for Christians to Understand America's Constitutional Crisis. Westbow Press. ISBN 978-1-5127-2274-1. OCLC 1147800122.

== See also ==
- List of alleged Georgia election racketeers
- List of Colorado State University people
- List of people granted executive clemency in the second Trump presidency
