= Mark Meadows =

American politician (born 1959)

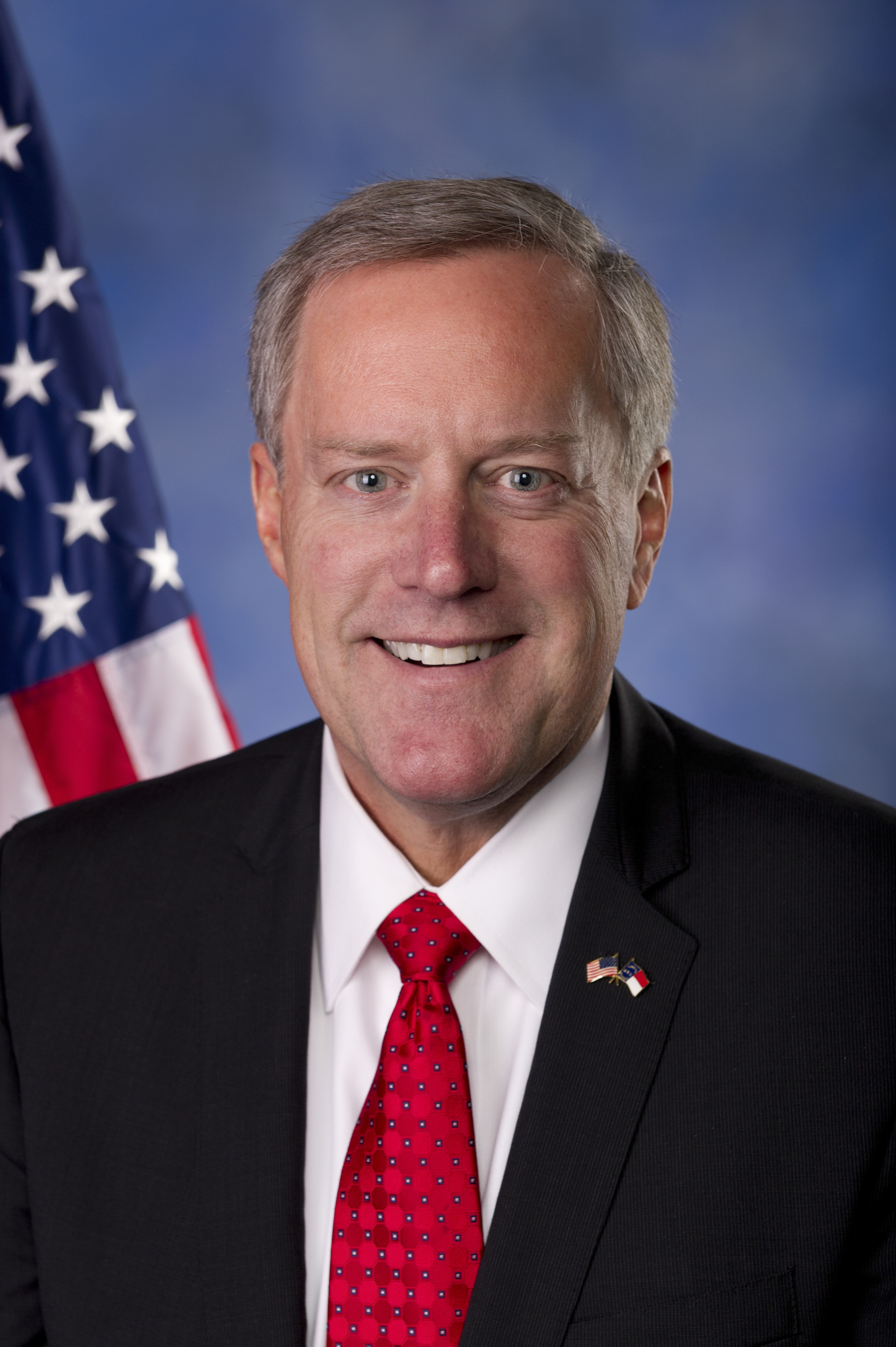
- Official portrait, 2013

29th White House Chief of Staff
- In office March 31, 2020 – January 20, 2021
- President: Donald Trump
- Principal Deputy: Emma Doyle; John Fleming
- Preceded by: Mick Mulvaney (acting)
- Succeeded by: Ron Klain

Ranking Member of the House Oversight Committee
- In office March 12, 2020 – March 30, 2020
- Preceded by: Jim Jordan
- Succeeded by: Jim Jordan

Chair of the House Freedom Caucus
- In office January 3, 2017 – October 1, 2019
- Deputy: Jim Jordan
- Preceded by: Jim Jordan
- Succeeded by: Andy Biggs

Member of the U.S. House of Representatives from North Carolina's 11th district
- In office January 3, 2013 – March 30, 2020
- Preceded by: Heath Shuler
- Succeeded by: Madison Cawthorn

Personal details
- Born: Mark Randall Meadows; July 28, 1959 (age 67) Verdun, France
- Party: Republican
- Spouse: Debbie Meadows (m. 1979)
- Children: 2
- Education: Florida State University; University of South Florida (AA)

Mark Randall Meadows (born July 28, 1959) is an American politician who served as the 29th White House chief of staff from 2020 to 2021 under the first Trump administration. A member of the Republican Party, he also served as the U.S. representative for North Carolina's 11th congressional district from 2013 to 2020. During his legislative tenure, Meadows chaired the Freedom Caucus from 2017 to 2019. He was considered one of Donald Trump's closest allies in the House of Representatives before his appointment as chief of staff.

A Tea Party Republican, Meadows was a founding member of the Freedom Caucus. During his time in Congress, he was one of the most conservative Republican lawmakers and played an important part of the United States federal government shutdown of 2013. He also sought to remove John Boehner as Speaker of the House of Representatives.

Meadows resigned from Congress on March 31, 2020, to become White House chief of staff. As chief of staff, he played an influential role in the Trump administration's response to the COVID-19 pandemic. He pressured the Food and Drug Administration to adopt less strict guidelines for COVID-19 vaccine trials, and admonished the White House's own infectious disease experts for not "staying on message" with Trump's rhetoric. In October 2020, Meadows said it was futile to try "to control the pandemic", emphasizing instead a plan to contain it with vaccines and therapeutics. As the virus spread among White House staff in the fall of 2020, he reportedly sought to conceal the cases, including his own. After the 2020 presidential election, Meadows participated in Trump's effort to overturn the election results and remain in power.

On December 14, 2021, Meadows was held in criminal contempt of Congress for refusing to cooperate with the January 6 Select Committee. He is the first White House chief of staff since the Watergate scandal and first former member of Congress to have been held in contempt of Congress. The contempt charge was referred to the Justice Department, which declined to prosecute him.

On October 26, 2022, a South Carolina circuit judge ordered Meadows to testify before a Georgia grand jury investigating Republican efforts to reverse the 2020 presidential election results in Georgia. The grand jury was empaneled by Fulton County district attorney Fani Willis, who said the inquiry is examining "the multistate, coordinated efforts to influence the results of the November 2020 election in Georgia and elsewhere."

On August 14, 2023, he was indicted along with 18 other people in the prosecution related to the 2020 election in Georgia; Meadows is the second White House Chief of Staff to face criminal charges, after H. R. Haldeman.

On April 24, 2024, Meadows was indicted by an Arizona grand jury on felony charges along with several others related to their alleged efforts to subvert Joe Biden’s 2020 victory in the state, according to an announcement by the state attorney general. Others indicted on the same charges include Rudy Giuliani, Jenna Ellis, John Eastman, Christina Bobb, top campaign adviser Boris Epshteyn, and former campaign aide Mike Roman.

On November 9, 2025, Trump pardoned Meadows; this does not affect state charges.

== Early life and education ==
Meadows's mother was from Sevierville, Tennessee, and his father from Pine Bluff, Arkansas. He was born at a United States Army hospital in Verdun, France, where his father was serving in the Army and his mother worked as a civilian nurse.

Meadows grew up in Brandon, Florida. He has said he was a "fat nerd" who went on a diet after a classmate rejected him for a date. Meadows attended Florida State University for one year in 1977–78. It was reported that Meadows held a Bachelor of Arts from the University of South Florida for many years in his official biography maintained by the Office of the Historian of the U.S. House of Representatives. In actuality, he graduated from the University of South Florida with an Associate of Arts.

== Early career ==
In 1987, Meadows started "Aunt D's", a small restaurant in Highlands, North Carolina, with building space provided by members of the Community Bible Church in Highlands. He later sold the sandwich shop, and used the proceeds to start a real estate development company in the Tampa, Florida, area where he resided until 2013, after he won the NC-11 Congressional district. After a stint working in a local hardware store, Meadows received support from Ginger Burnett Glasson: she provided a tract of land for a house; a joint business operating as Randall Burnett Investments, and work at a pizzeria she bought "to have something to do during the day and to help [Meadows] out."

While living in Highlands, Meadows served as chairman of the Republican Party in Macon County, and was a delegate to several state and national Republican conventions. Meadows was on North Carolina's Board for Economic Development in Western North Carolina.

In 2011, he moved to Glenville, North Carolina. In 2016, he sold his house and moved into an apartment in Biltmore Park, a mixed-use community in Asheville, North Carolina, while deciding where to buy next in either Henderson or Buncombe counties. He is the owner of Highlands Properties, which specializes in construction and land development. In 2014, Meadows sold 134 acres (54 hectares) of land in Dinosaur, Colorado, to a young earth creationist group. He appeared in the controversial creationist film Raising the Allosaur: The True Story of a Rare Dinosaur and the Home Schoolers Who Found It (2002), which was debunked by experts.

== U.S. House of Representatives ==
In Congress, Meadows had an ultraconservative voting record. He signed the Contract from America, a set of ten policies assembled by the Tea Party movement. Meadows was, with Jim Jordan, a founding member of the Freedom Caucus.

=== Hurricane Sandy Funding ===
Meadows voted against disaster relief spending for October 2012's Hurricane Sandy, which struck the Northeastern United States and caused severe damage. He was one of several Republicans who claimed the funding bill contained pork-barrel spending that had nothing to do with hurricane relief, a claim the bill's supporters denied.

Meadows's opposition to Sandy relief was recalled in 2017 news accounts after he and many Republicans who had opposed it voted in favor of disaster aid following Hurricane Harvey, which caused massive damage in Louisiana and Texas that August. Critics alleged that Republicans were hypocritically opposing spending in states with Democratic majorities while supporting it in Republican states. Republicans, including Meadows, claimed the situations were different because the Harvey spending bill contained no "pork". A Congressional Research Service review determined that the Sandy spending bill's funds were almost all devoted to recovery from Sandy.

=== Removal from Committee ===
Meadows served as chair of the Subcommittee on Government Operations up until June 20, 2015, when fellow Republican congressman Jason Chaffetz removed him from the position. A member of the House Republican leadership, Chaffetz removed Meadows due to Meadows's vote against a procedural motion the Republican leadership presented. Meadows was one of 34 Republicans who voted against the motion, which allowed for consideration of President Barack Obama's request for fast-track authority on trade agreements. Speaker John Boehner (R) supported the measure, but many Republicans felt it gave too much power to Democrats and Obama specifically. Chaffetz's action was seen as controversial, with many prominent Republican politicians, including Texas senator Ted Cruz (R), speaking out against the punishment.

Meadows served as ranking member of the House Oversight Committee for 18 days, until he assumed the office of White House Chief of Staff.

Meadows was a member of these committees:

- Committee on Foreign Affairs
  - Subcommittee on Africa, Global Health, Global Human Rights and International Organizations
  - Subcommittee on the Middle East and North Africa
- Committee on Oversight and Government Reform
  - Subcommittee on Government Operations (chair)
  - Subcommittee on Economic Growth, Job Creation and Regulatory Affairs
- Committee on Transportation and Infrastructure
  - Subcommittee on Aviation
  - Subcommittee on Economic Development, Public Buildings and Emergency Management
  - Subcommittee on Water Resources and Environment

Meadows was a member of these caucuses:

- Congressional Western Caucus
- U.S.-Japan Caucus
- House Freedom Caucus
- Second Amendment Caucus

=== 2013 federal government shutdown ===
Meadows has been described as playing an important part of the 2013 United States federal government shutdown. On August 21, 2013, he wrote an open letter to Boehner and Majority Leader Eric Cantor encouraging them to "affirmatively de-fund the implementation and enforcement of Obamacare in any relevant appropriations bills brought to the House floor in the 113th Congress, including any continuing appropriations bill." The document was signed by 79 of Meadows's colleagues in the House. Heritage Action (which opened operations in North Carolina in January 2011), ran critical Internet advertisements in the districts of 100 Republican lawmakers who failed to sign the letter. The letter has been described as controversial within the Republican Party.

The New York Daily News said Meadows put the federal government on the road to shutdown, saying calls to defund Obamacare through spending bills languished until Meadows wrote his letter. Meadows downplayed his influence, saying "I'm one of 435 members and a very small part of this." CNN described Meadows as the "architect of the brink" for his letter suggesting that Obamacare be defunded in any continuing appropriations bill. Meadows said that sensationalized his role.

John Ostendorff of the Asheville Citizen-Times wrote that Meadows "said it's best to close the government in the short term to win a delay on 'Obamacare', despite the potential negative impact on the economy." Ostendorff wrote that Meadows said he was doing what Tea Party members in Western North Carolina wanted him to do. Meadows said his constituents wanted him to fight against Obamacare "regardless of consequences." Jane Bilello, head of the Asheville Tea Party, said Meadows "truly represents us" on the issue of Obamacare. Meadows reportedly held conference calls with members of the Asheville Tea Party, telling them what was going on in Congress and about challenges he faced promoting their agenda.

In public comments, Meadows said he was working on a compromise that involved passing appropriations bills that would fund only parts of the government, such as a bill to fund the National Park Service, Smithsonian Institution, National Gallery of Art, and United States Holocaust Memorial Museum, and a bill to fund the National Institutes of Health. But partial or "mini" funding bills were rejected by the Democratic majority in the United States Senate.

=== Resolution to remove Speaker Boehner ===
On July 28, 2015, Meadows filed a resolution to vote on removing John Boehner (R) as speaker of the House. If the resolution passed, the House would then vote to elect a new speaker. Because he filed it as a nonprivileged resolution, it was sent to the House Committee on Rules for a vote first, rather than the House floor. The Committee on Rules was considered to have many members who were loyal to Boehner, so the resolution was seen as unlikely to move forward.

Meadows said he filed the resolution because Boehner had "endeavored to consolidate power, bypassing the majority" of Congress; "through inaction, caused the power of Congress to atrophy," "uses the power of the office to punish Members who vote according to their conscience"; "has intentionally provided for voice votes on consequential and controversial legislation to be taken without notice and with few Members present"; "uses the legislative calendar to create crises for the American People"; allowed members less than three days to review legislation before voting; and limited meaningful debate on the House floor. The resolution received support from Congressman Walter B. Jones Jr.

Boehner responded, "Listen, you have a member here and a member there who are off the reservation. No big deal ... Listen, this is one member. All right. I've got broad support amongst my colleagues. And frankly, it isn't even deserving of a vote." On September 25, 2015, Boehner announced his intention to resign as speaker. He officially resigned on October 31, 2015.

=== Congressional chief of staff behavior ===
A group of employees reported to Meadows' deputy chief of staff in October 2014 that they were uncomfortable with Meadows' then chief of staff, Kenny West, calling his behavior "inappropriate towards them". Meadows asked Representative Trey Gowdy's chief of staff (a woman and former sex-crimes prosecutor) to interview the employees, and Meadows eventually limited or prohibited West's presence in Meadows's Washington and district offices.

Although West resigned after the employees accused him of inappropriate behavior, he remained on the House payroll in violation of House rules, according to an independent House Ethics Committee investigation. Meadows paid West $58,125 from April 2015 to August 2015 even though he was no longer working in Meadows' office. There is "substantial reason to believe that Representative Meadows retained an employee who did not perform duties commensurate with the compensation the employee received and certified that the compensation met applicable House standards, in violation of House rules and standards of conduct," the Office of Congressional Ethics report said.

In November 2018, the House Ethics Committee fined Meadows over $40,000 (representing the amount West had been paid improperly) after concluding he "did not do enough to address" sexual harassment allegations against West. The committee concluded Meadows took "immediate and appropriate steps" by separating West from female staffers and requesting an investigation, but noted that West retained his title and "apparent authority over staff" during this period. "Representative Meadows could have and should have done more to ensure that his congressional office was free from discrimination or the perception of discrimination," the committee wrote. The committee fined Meadows $40,625 "for Mr. West's salary that was not commensurate with his work." The Daily Beast previously reported that a former aide told the committee Meadows and other top staff members in his office were aware of West's behavior before it was publicly reported.

=== Elections ===
==== 2012 ====
In late 2011 Meadows announced he was running for Congress in North Carolina's 11th congressional district, for the seat being vacated by Democratic incumbent Heath Shuler. The district had been significantly altered in redistricting. New lines were drawn straight through the middle of Warren Wilson College. Notably, it lost most of Asheville to the 10th district, while picking up some heavily Republican territory in the foothills. The old 11th had a slight Republican lean, but the new 11th was on paper the most Republican district in the state. In 2011 the North Carolina state legislature redrew the congressional districts based on updated population information from the 2010 census. As a result, the district is now 91.2% White, 3.0% Black, 1.4% Native American and 1.0% Asian. The district was drawn in such a way that in some parts of Asheville, one side of the street shifted to the 10th while the other side of the street stayed in the 11th.

Meadows won the July 2012 Republican primary runoff, and in the November general election faced Democratic nominee Hayden Rogers, who had been Shuler's chief of staff. On August 28, Meadows spoke at the 2012 Republican National Convention in Tampa. He won the general election with approximately 57% of the vote and took office in January 2013.

==== 2014 ====
Meadows was reelected with 62.9% of the vote.

==== 2016 ====
Meadows appeared with candidate Donald Trump on the campaign trail in Winston-Salem, North Carolina, in July 2016 just after the Republican National Convention, leading the crowd in a chant, "Lock her up", an anti-Hillary Clinton refrain.

Meadows won re-election with 64.1% of the vote.

==== 2018 ====
Meadows won reelection to his seat in the November 2018 election, receiving 59% of the vote to his Democratic opponent Phillip Price's 38%.

During the campaign Meadows supported President Trump's agenda, calling him a "conservative president" in 2017, and suggesting that Republicans who didn't support Trump should be removed from office. Trump's son-in-law Jared Kushner attended a private fundraiser for Meadows. In January 2018, Meadows traveled to Davos, Switzerland, with a congressional delegation for the World Economic Forum, along with a White House delegation including Trump and cabinet members including Treasury Secretary Steven Mnuchin, Secretary of State Rex Tillerson, and Energy Secretary Rick Perry.

==== 2020 ====
On December 19, 2019, Meadows announced that he would not seek reelection in 2020.

== White House Chief of Staff ==
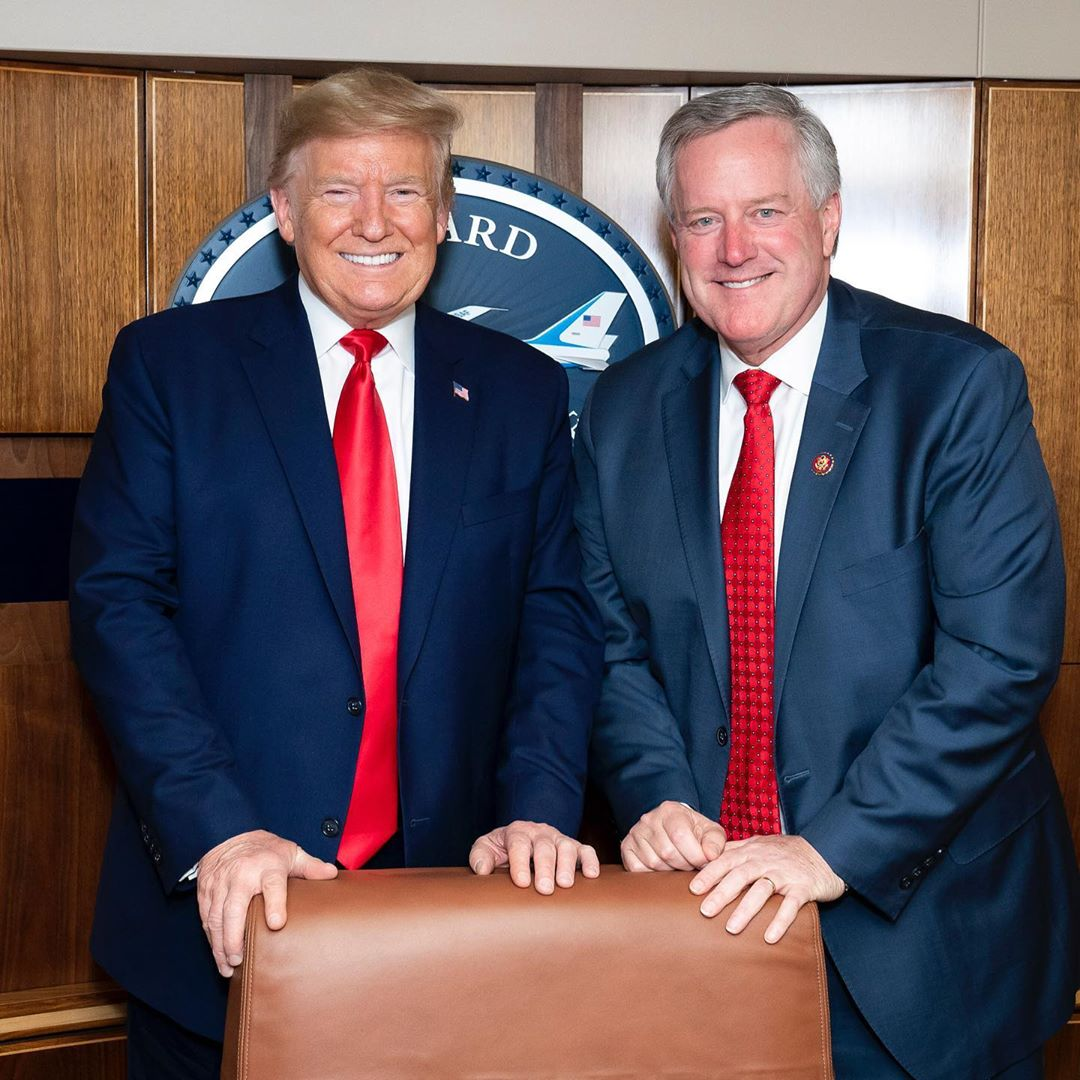
Meadows with President Trump on March 4, 2020

By 2017, Meadows and Donald Trump began telephone conversations following evening broadcasts by Sean Hannity on Fox News. In December 2018, Meadows was vocal about his desire to work in the White House as Chief of Staff upon the January 2019 departure of John F. Kelly. Until December 2018, Meadows claimed to have received a Bachelor of Arts degree. When questions about his credentials arose during media speculation that he was under consideration to serve as White House chief of staff, Meadows amended his official House biography and other sources to indicate that his degree was an associate, not a bachelor's.

On March 6, 2020, Trump named Meadows the next White House chief of staff, succeeding Acting Chief Mick Mulvaney. Meadows resigned from the House on March 30, 2020, and began his new role the next day.

Meadows and his wife allegedly committed voter fraud in 2020 when they registered to vote at a mobile home in North Carolina where they did not live. They voted by absentee ballot from that address. Two years later, North Carolina removed Meadows from the voter rolls while it investigated. On December 30, 2022, the attorney general's office of North Carolina closed the investigation, stating it had found insufficient evidence of voter fraud.

=== Efforts to overturn 2020 presidential election results ===
After Joe Biden won the 2020 presidential election, and Trump refused to concede while making false claims of systemic and pervasive fraud, Meadows aided Trump in his efforts to overturn the election and to pressure election officials in Georgia to overturn the results of the election in that state (which Biden won) based on Trump's baseless claims of fraud. He urged Georgia Secretary of State Brad Raffensperger to overturn the certification of Georgia's election results in a "spirit of cooperation and compromise". In a taped phone call during which Meadows was present, Trump attempted to pressure Raffensperger into recounting Georgia's votes, claiming he had won the state.

Alongside Trump's son-in-law and advisor Jared Kushner, Meadows conveyed to Senate Majority Leader Mitch McConnell that the Trump administration would pursue all possible avenues in a bid to overturn the election results. Meadows also connected Trump to Mark Martin, a former North Carolina judge who advanced the radical claim that Trump's Vice President, Mike Pence, could refuse to count the electoral votes from states Biden won.

Meadows also repeatedly pressed Acting Attorney General Jeffrey A. Rosen to have the Justice Department investigate unfounded conspiracy theories claiming fraud, including one that posited that people in Italy used military technology and satellites to tamper with voting machine and turning Trump votes into Biden votes. The claim was one of several outlandish claims circulating online in the days before a pro-Trump mob attacked the Capitol on January 6, 2021.

==== U.S. House select committee on the January 6 attack ====
On September 24, 2021, the U.S. House of Representatives committee investigating the 2021 United States Capitol attack subpoenaed Meadows for records and testimony relating to the insurrection, but he failed to show up for a deposition before the committee. Adam Schiff has said the committee is working on issuing a criminal referral for Meadows.

In early December 2021, Meadows provided to the January 6 Select Committee a PowerPoint presentation on how the election could be overturned that he had received by email the day before the storming of the capitol. The presentation recommended that the president declare a national emergency to retain power. A lawyer representing Meadows stated that he did not act upon the document.

On December 14, 2021, Meadows was held in criminal contempt of Congress for refusing to cooperate with the January 6 Select Committee. He is the first former member of Congress to have been held in contempt of Congress. The contempt charge was referred to the Justice Department, which declined to prosecute him.

In April 2022, the January 6 Select Committee and CNN obtained texts Meadows had sent and received between the 2020 election and the January 6 Capitol attack. In the messages, Sean Hannity, Brian Kilmeade, Laura Ingraham, and Donald Trump Jr. texted Meadows during the riot urging him to get Trump to condemn the violence on Capitol Hill. Other texts include plans to fight the election results and strategies to deflect blame for the attack.

Former Meadows top aide Cassidy Hutchinson provided extensive closed-door testimony to the January 6 committee, which signaled it considered her a key witness. As committee public hearings were beginning in June 2022, Hutchinson had replaced her attorney, who had deep connections with Trump associates, with a former chief of staff to Trump's first attorney general Jeff Sessions, who had enraged Trump by recusing himself from oversight of the Mueller investigation.

==== Classified documents investigation ====
In September 2022, Meadows turned over additional texts and emails to the National Archives following the FBI search of Mar-a-Lago.

==== Election investigation (Georgia) ====
Meadows' booking photograph released by the Fulton County, Georgia, sheriff's office

In late November 2022, the South Carolina Supreme Court ruled that Meadows must testify in the Georgia election probe into the Trump–Raffensperger phone call. On August 14, 2023, along with 18 co-defendants, he was indicted in the Georgia investigation. Meadows turned himself in at the Fulton County jail on August 24, 2023, and was released on $100,000 bail. On September 5, 2023, Meadows, along with co-defendants John Eastman and Jeffrey Clark, waived his arraignment and entered a written not guilty plea.

==== Election investigation (federal) ====
In June 2023, it was reported that Meadows had testified to a federal grand jury as part of special counsel Jack Smith's ongoing investigation into the former president's handling of classified documents. On October 24, 2023, it was disclosed that Meadows, under a grant of immunity by Smith, admitted that he had repeatedly informed President Donald Trump that there was no basis to the contentions that there had been election fraud that caused him to lose the 2020 presidential election, and despite the fact that Meadows had authored a book that made claims directly to the contrary.

== Career after White House ==
Meadows became a principal at the Conservative Partnership Institute in January 2021 as Biden took office. The group has aimed to elect conservatives, particularly using dark money, and changing voting rules.

== Political positions ==
=== Abortion ===
Meadows is opposed to abortion and has called abortion a tragedy. He opposes federal funding for abortion and believes parents should be notified of underage abortion procedures. He also opposes requiring churches and other religious sites to provide birth control options to employees.

In February 2013 Meadows voted against renewing the Violence Against Women Act. Meadows has said he casts his votes based not on his personal feelings but on what the majority of his constituents in "God's Country" tell him to do.

=== Economics ===
While in Congress, Meadows advocated for a balanced budget amendment to the United States Constitution. He supports a moratorium on all earmarks until the budget has been balanced. Meadows opposes any cuts to military spending levels.

Meadows opposed the federal stimulus spending during the Obama administration; as Trump's White House chief of staff, he supported Trump's fiscal stimulus proposals, and was Trump's lead negotiator on stimulus legislation, pushing for $1.8 trillion in federal stimulus spending, a number some Senate Republicans resisted. Meadows has signed the Taxpayer Protection Pledge, and he opposes raising any taxes, including the income tax. He supports a flat-rate income tax for all earners and a repeal of the raise in the capital gains tax. He also supports eliminating the estate tax.

In 2016 Meadows wrote Trump a letter demanding the repeal of the federal "prevailing wage" requirement, which requires that laborers and mechanics on public works projects be paid the locally prevailing wages. The rule was initially made to protect traveling black workers in the South from being paid far less than local workers. It evolved into a protection for union workers, ensuring that non-unionized competitors would have to pay the same rate, making it difficult to underbid for work. The letter also demanded the repeal of the overtime rule from the Obama administration, which said people making less than $47,000 a year must be paid extra for overtime hours, compared to the previous requirement that those making over $23,000 a year could be denied overtime pay if the worker's duties could be considered "managerial". The letter also demanded the end of regulations requiring federal contractors to be paid for sick leave.

=== COVID-19 ===
As chief of staff, Meadows played an influential role in the Trump administration's response to the COVID-19 pandemic. He pressured the Food and Drug Administration to adopt less strict guidelines for COVID-19 vaccine trials and admonished the White House's own infectious disease experts for not "staying on message" with Trump's rhetoric. In October 2020, Meadows said it was futile to try "to control the pandemic", emphasizing instead a plan to contain it with vaccines and therapeutics. On November 4, 2020, Meadows tested positive for COVID-19, but only disclosed it to a small group of people who were asked to keep it quiet, thus preventing others who had interacted with Meadows from taking the proper precautions and hindering contact tracing. Within the administration, Meadows advised Trump not to openly embrace mask-wearing, saying, "The base will revolt." He admonished Anthony Fauci, one of the administration's leading experts in guiding the response, for not "staying on message". He impressed upon Fauci, Deborah Birx and other government public health experts not to comment on restrictive measures for dealing with the virus. While interacting with reporters, Meadows refused to wear a mask.

In October 2020, when asked about the lack of face mask usage at Trump rallies, Meadows said it was futile to try "to control the pandemic" and that the focus would be on getting a vaccine. Public health experts, including those in the White House, have pointed to face masks as one of the most basic precautions that have been proven to halt the spread of COVID-19.

While chief of staff, Meadows pressured the Food and Drug Administration to adopt less strict guidelines for COVID-19 vaccine trials. He criticized FDA commissioner Stephen M. Hahn as too heavily influenced by the FDA's scientist staff. During coronavirus relief negotiations, Meadows argued against giving additional funding to the Centers for Disease Control and Prevention (CDC).

On November 6, 2020, it was reported that Meadows had tested positive for COVID-19; per the Trump administration, he tested positive on November 4. Meadows did not issue a statement after he tested positive and did not make it widely known to administration staff. A small group of people were informed and told to keep it quiet. This caused consternation among other administration staff, as it hindered contact tracing efforts and endangered staff.

=== Environment and energy ===
In December 2016 Meadows gave Trump a wish list of regulations to be repealed. It included a demand to get rid of federal funding to study climate change. He also requested Trump repeal several environmental regulations, including the Renewable Fuel Standard, end the prohibition of drilling oil on federal lands, and pull the US out of the Paris Climate Agreement.

Meadows opposes cap-and-trade emission policies and supported off-shore oil and gas extraction.

=== LGBT rights ===
Meadows opposes same-sex marriage. In March 2013, he said that if the Supreme Court ruled gay marriage bans unconstitutional, it would be a "huge invasion into states' rights" and cause a constitutional crisis.

=== Regulations ===
Meadows opposes any restrictions on gun purchases and opposes a national gun registry that would list detailed information about firearm ownership.

Meadows opposes regulations that require all internet providers provide internet at equal speeds to all parties. In 2016 he gave Trump a list of regulations to repeal that included net neutrality regulations by the Federal Communications Commission.

=== Health care ===
Meadows opposes the Patient Protection and Affordable Care Act (Obamacare), and has said that it should be replaced by private enterprise.

Less than a year after entering Congress, Meadows wrote the letter that initially urged House Speaker John Boehner to shut down the government unless the ACA was defunded. Some constituents have criticized him as responsible for the 2013 government shutdown; The Washington Post called him its "chief architect". His district lost up to $1 million per day during the shutdown because the national parks were closed.

In January 2017, Meadows voted for a budget resolution that initiated the process of repealing Obamacare. On May 4, 2017, Meadows voted for the American Health Care Act (AHCA), which would partially repeal and replace Obamacare.

After the Congressional Budget Office (CBO) released numbers about the AHCA's effects on Americans in 2017, there were several reports that Meadows became emotional after reading about the AHCA's likely effects on those with preexisting conditions. Others reported he cried only after bringing up his family members who had dealt with preexisting conditions, including his sister who had died of breast cancer, and his father who had died of lung cancer. Meadows said he wouldn't "make a political decision today that affects somebody's sister or father because I wouldn't do it to myself." When asked about the CBO numbers, Meadows said Trump was "committed to making sure preexisting conditions are covered in principle and in practice, which means that funding has to be there to make it work."

=== Foreign policy ===
Meadows is a strong supporter of Israel. He said that the Israeli withdrawal from the Sinai and Gaza did not bring peace, but rather "In many ways, ... made [the situation] more difficult." Meadows has opposed the Boycott, Divestment and Sanctions movement targeting Israel.

Meadows was among 60 Republicans to oppose condemning Trump's action of withdrawing forces from Syria. Along with Matt Gaetz and a handful of Republicans, Meadows broke with his party and voted to end Saudi assistance to the War in Yemen.

On December 8, 2019, Meadows claimed that Trump never asked a foreign leader to investigate a political rival, despite a transcript of the July 25, 2019, phone call between Trump and Ukrainian President Volodymyr Zelenskyy where Trump asks Zelenskyy to investigate former Vice President Joe Biden and in spite of Trump's October 3, 2019, public calling upon China to investigate Hunter Biden's business activities there while his father was vice president. Meadows said he would be "OK" with a Democratic president doing what Trump did: "We have Democrat Senators who have done just that."

=== Russia investigation ===
Meadows, a member of the House Oversight and Government Reform Committee, has been a harsh critic of Special Counsel Robert Mueller's investigation into Russian interference in the 2016 election. During Trump's presidency, Meadows regularly conferred with Trump about Mueller's probe. Meadows has been described as a "Trump ally". In May 2018, Meadows called for a financial audit of the Mueller investigation.

In July 2018, along with Jim Jordan, Meadows called on the Department of Justice to "review allegations that Deputy Attorney General Rod Rosenstein threatened to subpoena phone records and documents from a House Intelligence Committee staffer". An aide termed the deputy AG's threats "downright chilling". In their written request, they wrote that in his use of investigative powers, Rosenstein retaliated "against rank-and-file staff members", therefore abusing his authority. Furthermore, during a Fox News interview by Laura Ingraham that same month, he "threatened to force a vote on the GOP resolution" that would impeach the deputy AG. Arguing he could force the resolution to the floor as a "privileged motion", he elaborated: "we hope it doesn't have to come to that". He filed articles of impeachment against Rosenstein on July 25, although the measure cannot be "brought straight to the House floor". Meadows's Democratic opponent in the 2018 election, Phillip Price, condemned the impeachment resolution as an attempt to shut down the Justice Department's investigation of Russian meddling into the 2016 election through "obstruction of justice."

== See also ==
- List of alleged Georgia election racketeers
- List of people granted executive clemency in the second Trump presidency

U.S. House of Representatives
Preceded by Heath Shuler	Member of the U.S. House of Representatives from North Carolina's 11th congressional district 2013–2020	Succeeded by Madison Cawthorn
Preceded by Jim Jordan	Ranking Member of the House Oversight Committee; 2020	Succeeded by Jim Jordan
Party political offices
Preceded by Jim Jordan	Chair of the House Freedom Caucus; 2017–2019	Succeeded by Andy Biggs
Political offices
Preceded by Mick Mulvaney	White House Chief of Staff; 2020–2021	Succeeded by Ron Klain
U.S. order of precedence (ceremonial)
Preceded by Renee Ellmers as Former U.S. Representative	Order of precedence of the United States as Former U.S. Representative	Succeeded by Robert Pittenger as Former U.S. Representative
