= Black Voices for Trump =

American political group

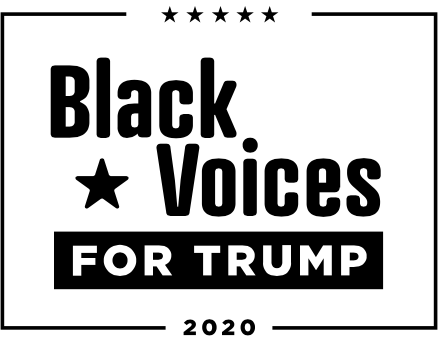
- Type: Black conservatism Trumpism
- Purpose: Raise political support for Donald Trump
- Methods: Campaign events, merchandise
- Director: Harrison Floyd

Black Voices for Trump was the official African American outreach effort of the Trump 2020 campaign. Their goal was to raise support for United States president Donald Trump among African Americans. The group was founded in November 2019.

== Activities ==
The organization launched with an event at the Georgia World Congress Center featuring Ben Carson and Herman Cain.

At a Black Voices for Trump event in Atlanta, Trump pledged to make Juneteenth a federal holiday and push for economic development.

At another event, Trump told a crowd in Atlanta that the Democrats were fighting harder for people in the country illegally rather than for the black community.

The organization held campaign events in majority Black neighborhoods as well as targeting social media ads to increase turnout for Trump, for example focusing on the importance of Black Republicans in Milwaukee, and focusing on highlighting ways that African Americans have benefited from the Trump economy. After the 2020 elections, exit polls showed that Trump ultimately increased his support among African Americans compared to 2016, and particularly in the Midwest. Apart from economic concerns, a 2023 study found that it was race-related issues that drove more African Americans to side with Trump.

The organization also released merchandise focusing on Black millennials and hosted online “Black Voices for Trump Real Talk” events.

In August 2023, Harrison Floyd, the executive director of Black Voices for Trump, was charged with three felonies as part of the prosecution of Donald Trump in Georgia. The indictment paper alleges Floyd recruited pastor Stephen Lee to organize a meeting with a local election official and Trevian Kutti, a publicist. Floyd turned himself in at the Fulton County, Georgia jail on August 24, 2023. Floyd was detained because Judge Emily Richardson deemed him a flight risk due to a pending misdemeanor charge in Maryland. Floyd's other charge was due to a May 2023 incident alleging that he assaulted an FBI agent in Maryland.

== See also ==
- Black conservatism in the United States
- Trumpism
