= Harrison Floyd =

Georgia politician

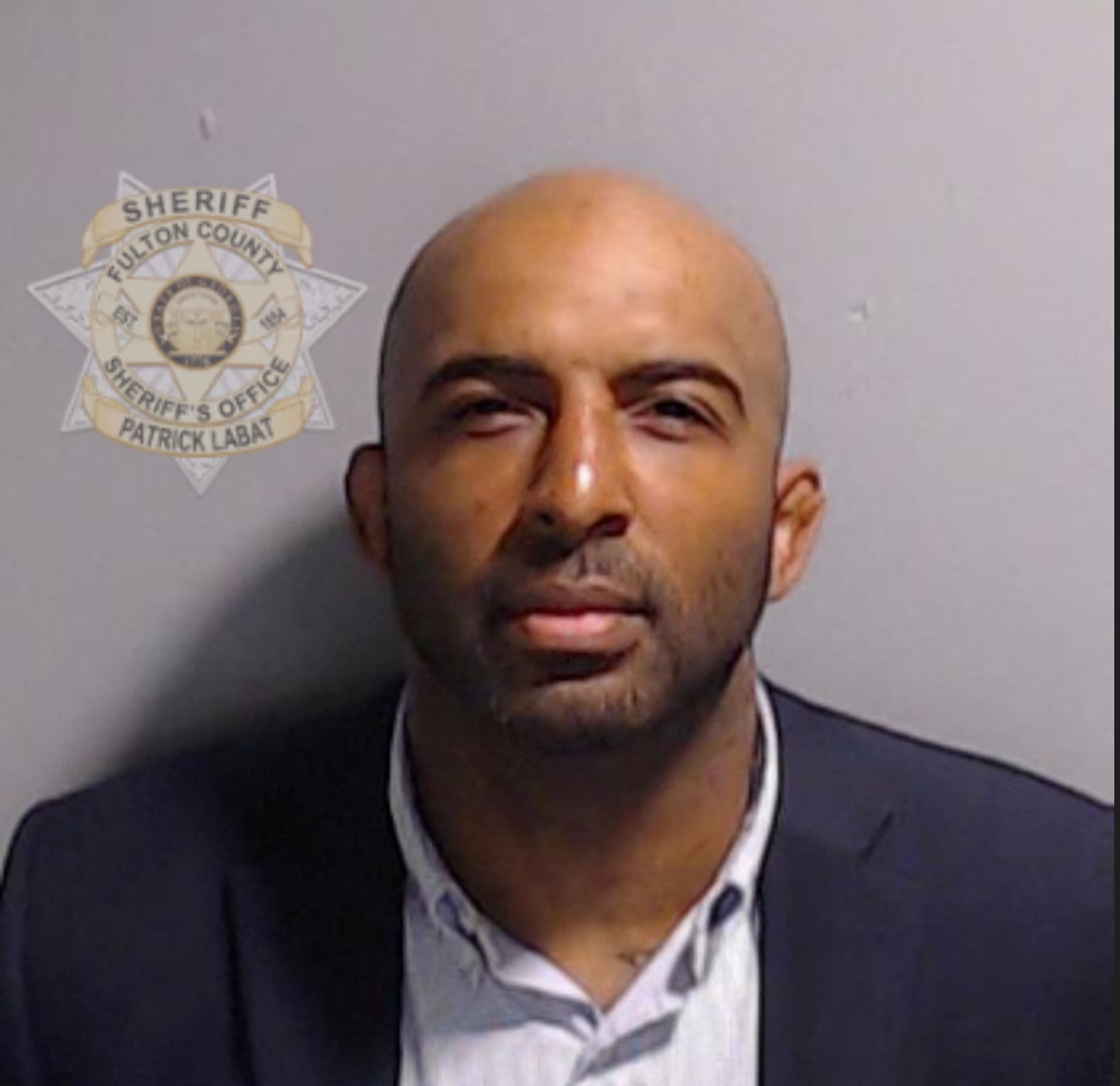
Mug shot of Harrison Floyd, released by the Fulton County, Georgia, sheriff's office (2023)

Harrison William Prescott Floyd III (born November 10, 1984) is a military veteran and politician. He was a senior campaign staffer on former President Donald Trump's 2020 re-election campaign and is one of the 19 defendants indicted in 2023 in Fulton County, Georgia.

== Early life and education ==
Born on November 10, 1984, Harrison Floyd is the eldest of three boys. His family and friends call him "H.W." or "Willie." The Floyd family has a history of serving in the U.S. Armed Forces; they moved regularly to different military bases until his graduation from High School. Floyd's father was a Sergeant Major in the Army and received multiple duty assignments to Germany, North Carolina, Texas, Illinois, Virginia, and Korea. As a result, Harrison can speak German and Italian.

After his senior year of High School, Floyd enlisted into the United States Marine Corps . He served for ten years before transitioning into politics.

Floyd served as a U.S. Marine from 2003 to 2014. In a 2019 campaign press release, it stated he had multiple combat deployments to Saqlawiyah and Ramadi, Iraq. In online profiles, interviews, and press releases, Floyd said that his assignments and certifications included machine gunner, combat marksmanship trainer, and martial arts instructor trainer.

After leaving active duty, Floyd earned a combined Bachelors in Political Science and Master's in Legislative Affairs from the George Washington University dual degree program. In 2017, he participated in the Emerging Leaders Seminar at Yale School of Management. The seminar brings together a talented cohort of young underrepresented professionals of color, at Yale, to gain new skills and enhances their career trajectories.

Between 2021 and 2023, Floyd completed Executive Education at the Wharton School of the University of Pennsylvania focusing on Entrepreneurship & Digital Marketing.

== Career ==
In 2017, Floyd began his political career as an intern in the marketing department of The Heritage Foundation. He was accepted into the Young Leaders Program, which has grown to become one of the top policy internships in the nation. After a highly selective interview process, interns are prepared for future roles as conservative leaders.

Following Heritage, Floyd began navigating Capitol Hill. First, as a Legislative Fellow, Floyd worked in Congressman Doug Collins' office. At the time, the Congressman was the Ranking Member of the House Judiciary Committee. Next, he became a Max Kampelman Policy Fellow at the U.S. Commission on Security and Cooperation in Europe. His works as a policy fellow focused on international law, the European Union, economic affairs, and OSCE Parliamentary Assembly.

In 2019, Floyd announced his candidacy for the Georgia's 7th congressional district as a Republican, but dropped out of the race just over a month later to work on President Trump's 2020 re-election campaign. Floyd led the campaign's African American outreach effort called Black Voices for Trump. Their goal aimed to raise support for Trump among African Americans.

In the 2020 presidential election, Floyd helped President Trump increase his share of the black vote by 5 percentage points among black men and 4 percentage points among black women compared to 2016, which gave Trump the highest share of minority votes for any Republican nominee since Richard Nixon in 1960.

== Legal issues ==
=== Maryland assault case ===
On February 23, 2023, FBI special agents attempted to serve Floyd with a federal grand jury subpoena related to the U.S. Department of Justice's investigation into efforts to overturn the results of the 2020 presidential election.

A police report shows Floyd called 911 immediately after and claimed he and his daughter were accosted by a "pair of men who pursued him into his apartment building." Floyd's attorney stated "the two men who approached his client never displayed their credentials, so Floyd could not be sure who they were or what they were doing." Hours after police responded to the 911 call, authorities returned and Floyd was arrested by local police after the FBI agents filed their complaint. In an affidavit, an FBI agent stated that Floyd had aggressively confronted him and "body-slammed." The case remains open as of January 2024.

In May 2023, Floyd was charged in federal court in Maryland with simple assault against a federal officer. A federal magistrate judge released Floyd pending trial on the condition that he surrender his passport and not possess weapons. There have been no significant actions since May of 2023.

On January 4, 2024, Politico released body camera footage that it obtained through a public records request.

=== Georgia election racketeering prosecution ===
In August 2023, Fulton County District Attorney Fani Willis charged Floyd, along with former President Donald Trump and 17 others, with violating Georgia's Racketeer Influenced and Corrupt Organizations (RICO) Act. Floyd was also charged with influencing a witness and conspiracy to commit solicitation of false statements. Floyd is one of two black defendants charged in the Georgia case; the other is Trevian Kutti. Floyd and two other Trump allies—Kutti, a Chicago-based publicist, and Steve Lee, a chaplain and former police officer—are accused of harassing a Georgia election worker into falsely confessing to supposed election crimes.

Of the 19 defendants, Floyd was the only one DA Willis did not previously make arrangements for release on bond. The Fulton County DA's office claimed, after surrendering on August 24, this is the reason he was held for six days at the Fulton County Jail; However, at an emergency hearing 24 hours after his arrest, Judge Emily Richardson deemed Floyd a flight risk. This sparked an enormous backlash in the conservative community, and over $330,000 was crowdfunded for Floyd's legal defense. After public outcry of arresting the only black male defendant, on August 29, a judge set a bond amount ($100,000) along with conditions of pretrial release, and he was released the next day. He waived arraignment and entered a plea of not guilty.

In September 2023, after his release from jail while awaiting trial, Floyd said that he and Joe Oltmann were directing $72,000 in contributions to his legal defense fund to help post bail for inmates in Georgia. He said the effort would prioritize parents charged with nonviolent crimes.

In November 2023, Fulton County DA Willis failed to revoke Floyd's bond citing social media posts. DA Willis stated he had "engaged in numerous intentional and flagrant violations" of his bond agreement. Posting on rebranded Twitter his "effort to intimidate codefendants and witnesses, to communicate directly and indirectly with codefendants and witnesses, and to otherwise obstruct the administration of justice." Judge Scott McAfee found no intimidation in any of Floyd's cited posts. However, he did find a technical violation regarding tagging witnesses on the platform X. Judge McAfee declined to remand Floyd, and instead ordered a revision of his bond.

== Personal life ==
Floyd has a wife and daughter. He currently lives in North Bethesda, Maryland.
