= Bob Cheeley =

American lawyer

Bob Cheeley

Robert David Cheeley (known as Bob Cheeley) is an American lawyer and a notable figure in the legal and political landscape of the U.S. state of Georgia. He is known for his involvement in high-profile cases, including election-related lawsuits and cases against major corporations. Cheeley has also been involved in controversies related to the 2020 United States presidential election.

== Early life and education ==
Cheeley was born and raised in Buford, Georgia. He attended Buford City Schools from kindergarten through 12th grade, graduating in 1975. He later attended the University of Georgia, where he earned a degree in political science in 1978 and a Juris Doctor from the University of Georgia School of Law in 1982.

== Career ==
Cheeley is a founding member and the managing partner of Cheeley Law Group, LLC, located in Alpharetta, Georgia. Over the course of his career, he has secured over $600 million in jury verdicts and settlements, most of which have been against insurers and publicly traded corporations.

Cheeley has represented clients in lawsuits against major automakers such as General Motors, Toyota Motor Company, Suzuki, Nissan Motor Company, and Ford Motor Company. One of his most notable cases was Moseley vs. General Motors, which resulted in a verdict of $105 million in Atlanta in 1993.

In 2019, Cheeley was involved in a multimillion-dollar fee dispute with his former law firm, Butler Wooten & Peak. The dispute was resolved through mediation.

== Political involvement ==
Cheeley has been involved in political cases, including election-related lawsuits. After the 2020 U.S. presidential election, he participated in public hearings before Georgia state lawmakers where he and other allies of former President Donald Trump pushed baseless fraud claims.

== Indictment for racketeering ==
In 2023, Cheeley was indicted by Fulton County, Georgia District Attorney Fani Willis on 10 state crimes, including violating Georgia’s anti-racketeering law, perjury, and soliciting a public officer to violate their oath.

== Personal life ==
Cheeley is married to Lisa Ackerman Cheeley, and they have three grown children, David, Amelia, and Harrison, and one grandchild. He is a long-standing member of the Georgia Trial Lawyers Association and the American Association for Justice. Cheeley is a member of Perimeter Church in Johns Creek, Georgia, where he has been attending since 1992.
