= Georgia Council on Economic Education =

The Georgia Council on Economic Education (GCEE) is a nonprofit organization that was established in 1972 to assist elementary and secondary educators in teaching economics in the public and independent schools of the U.S. state of Georgia. The council's vision is that students will leave school prepared for their economic roles as workers, consumers, and citizens and will become informed decision makers in the global economy.

== History ==
The GCEE was founded largely due to the efforts of Mills B. Lane Jr., the chief executive officer of the Citizens and Southern National Bank in Atlanta. He recruited business leaders from The Coca-Cola Company, Flowers Industries, Piggly-Wiggly Southern, and Trust Company Bank, as well as education leaders including the superintendent of Atlanta's city schools, the state superintendent of schools, and the chancellor of the Board of Regents of the University System of Georgia.

David V. Martin served as the executive director of the council from 1982 until his retirement in 2017 Mike Raymer, a former teacher of the year at Starr's Mill High School in Fayette County, a former Georgia Council Economics Teacher of the Year and a former Georgia Council for the Social Studies Outstanding Social Studies Educator Award winner, has been the executive director of the GCEE since 2017.

== Activities ==
The GCEE conducts workshops to strengthen educators' knowledge and skills and provides them with resource materials appropriate to the grade levels and courses they are teaching. It also coordinates a variety of special programs, including the award-winning Georgia Economic History Project and the Stock Market Game competition.

The council provides workshops and materials at little or no cost to teachers and schools. In 2009, it held 176 workshops attended by 3,586 Georgia teachers.

One of the council's best-known programs is the Georgia Stock Market Game, in which students invest a fictional $100,000.

== Funding ==
As of 2010, The council had a $1.15 million annual budget and received financial support from dozens of donors, most of them affiliated with corporations, including Bank of America, Equifax, UPS and Georgia Power. The council's support was 61 percent corporate, 30 percent foundations, 4 percent individuals and 5 percent from fee income.
