= Trevian Kutti =

American publicist and lobbyist

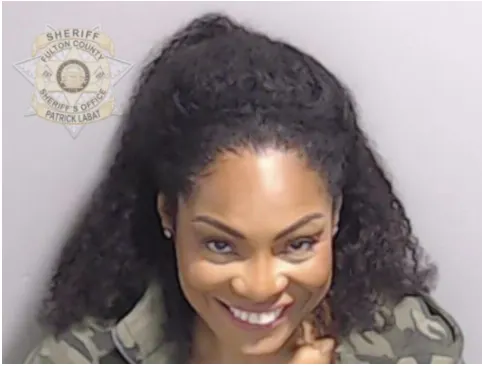
Mug shot of Trevian Kutti, released by the Fulton County, Georgia, sheriff's office

Trevian C. Kutti is an American publicist and lobbyist who worked for celebrities including R. Kelly, Kanye West, and Regina King. Starting in 2020, she also worked as a cannabis lobbyist in Illinois. In 2023, Trevian Kutti was charged with three felonies and indicted in State of Georgia v. Donald J. Trump, et al. for her alleged attempt to influence the testimony of an election worker following the 2020 United States presidential election in Georgia.

== Life ==
Kutti is from Nebraska. In 1997, she and her husband opened a G'Bani, a luxury high-heeled shoe store in Chicago. Kutti ran stores in Old Town and Gold Coast Historic District. She later founded the media and entertainment advisory company, Trevian Worldwide. Kutti worked as a stylist for actress Regina King. Until 2018, she was a publicist for singer R. Kelly. In September 2018, she began working for Kanye West as a publicist and later director of operations. In January 2020, she registered as a lobbyist for Red White and Bloom, a Canadian cannabis company with a farm in Granville, Illinois. Formerly a supporter of politician Hillary Clinton, Kutti attended a rally for Donald Trump in June 2020 where she held a Black Voices for Trump sign. In 2020, she was the campaign manager for U.S. House candidate Angela Stanton-King. By 2021, Kutti was no longer associated with West. In September 2021, Kutti's online profile listed herself as a member of the U.S. president Donald Trump's Young Black Leadership Council.

On January 4, 2021, after the 2020 United States presidential election in Georgia, Kutti confronted election worker Ruby Freeman. In June 2022, as part of the 2020 Georgia election investigation, Kutti's testimony was sought for a special grand jury in Fulton County, Georgia. In August 2023, she was indicted as a defendant in State of Georgia v. Donald J. Trump, et al. She allegedly participated in the attempts to influence Freeman's testimony. She is accused of visiting Freeman's home, falsely telling a neighbor that "she was a crisis manager attempting to 'help' Freeman"; meeting with Freeman at the Cobb County PD for over an hour, again under the pretense of offering help; and asking Freeman to give false testimony. She was booked on August 24, 2023.

In June 2024, she claimed that in the Holocaust "Jews died but it was NOT 6M".

== See also ==
- List of alleged Georgia election racketeers
