= Never Trump movement =

Conservative opposition to Donald Trump

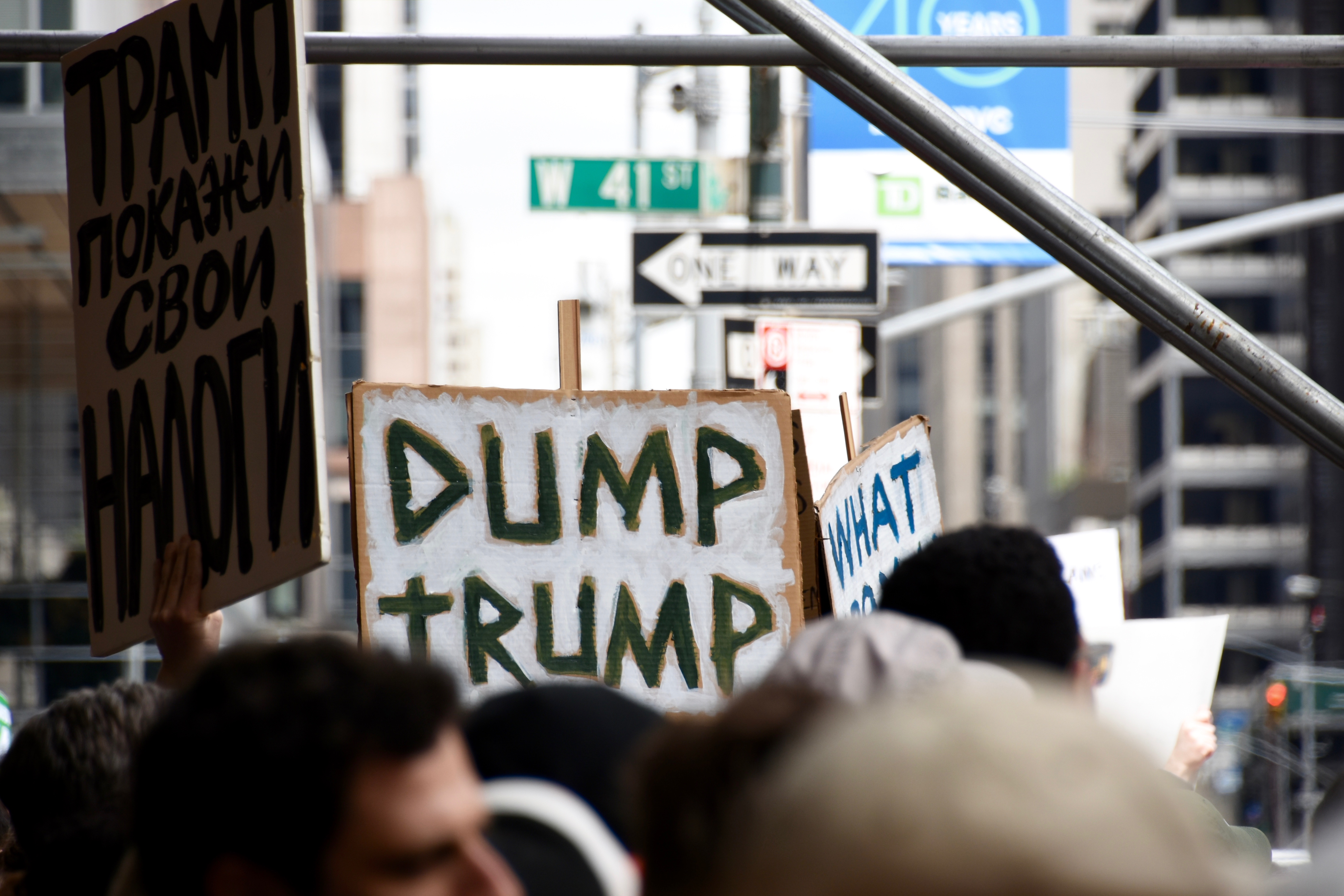
"Dump Trump" is a common slogan used by anti-Trump conservatives

The Never Trump movement (also known as #nevertrump, Stop Trump, anti-Trump, or Dump Trump movement) is a conservative political movement that opposes Trumpism and Donald Trump, the 45th and 47th president of the United States, and supports a putative return to a more rules-based internationalist, traditionally conservative Republican Party. The name originates from Republicans who would never be "persuaded to vote for Trump in the 2016 general election."

It is generally made up of "long-standing, professional Republicans or conservatives", donors, consultants, operatives, writers and commentators, as well as Republican officeholders. Many of the last group have abandoned the cause and journeyed to Trump's home in Mar-a-Lago to "kiss the ring" or "bend the knee", as rank and file support for Trump has remained strong, and his takeover of the Republican Party has been consolidated. The movement began as an effort on the part of a group of Republicans (known as Never Trump Republicans) and other prominent conservatives to prevent Republican front-runner Trump from obtaining the 2016 Republican Party presidential nomination, and after he was nominated, from winning the 2016 United States presidential election. Following his victory, remaining adherents worked to foil his re-election in 2020, and then his return in 2024. With his second presidential election victory in 2024, the New York Times described Republican dissenters as having "been driven into retirement, defeated in primaries or cowed into silence". Many "Never Trumpers" belong(ed) to The Lincoln Project.

Early in its existence, the movement was compared to the Mugwumps, Republicans in the 1884 United States presidential election who refused to back party nominee James G. Blaine and instead threw support for Democratic candidate Grover Cleveland. Trump himself has condemned the movement as "more dangerous for our country than the do nothing Democrats" and has described its supporters as "human scum".

== Complaints ==
A 2020 book review in National Review magazine (written by Dan McLaughlin) listed as motivators of conservative opponents Trump's

- character
  - a "long record of betraying everyone who trusted him";
  - "his rhetoric that legitimated many of the worst false things that conservatism's critics had said for years;
- lack of qualifications or knowledge;
- a lack of any record of supporting conservative ideas or causes.

As of late 2024 another list (written by Ashley Pratte Oates) of what turned (some) conservatives against Trump included:

his convictions on 34 felony counts and overwhelming evidence that he incited violence against the Capitol on Jan. 6, 2021 and illegally retained classified documents; his racist, sexist and divisive rhetoric; his cozying up to dictators; his attacks on our Constitution, which he has called for terminating when it didn't suit him.

== History ==
Besides Trump's election victories, setbacks for his opponents have included the grassroots Republican support for the January 6 insurrectionists and Nikki Haley's withdrawal from the presidential campaign in early 2024.

=== 2016 election ===
Trump entered the Republican primaries on June 16, 2015, at a time when governors Jeb Bush, Scott Walker, and Senator Marco Rubio were viewed as early frontrunners. Trump was considered a longshot to win the nomination, but his large media profile gave him a chance to spread his message and appear in the Republican debates. By the end of 2015, Trump was leading the Republican field in national polls. At this point, some Republicans, such as former Mitt Romney adviser Alex Castellanos, called for a "negative ad blitz" against Trump, and another former Romney aide founded Our Principles PAC to attack Trump.

After Trump won the New Hampshire and South Carolina primaries, many Republican leaders called for the party to unite around a single leader to stop Trump's nomination. The Never Trump movement gained momentum following Trump's wins in the March 15, 2016, Super Tuesday primaries, including his victory over Rubio in Florida.

==== Erickson meeting ====
On March 17, 2016, anti-Trump conservatives met at the Army and Navy Club in Washington, D.C., to discuss strategies for preventing Trump from securing the presidential nomination at the Republican National Convention in July. Among the strategies discussed were a "unity ticket", a possible third-party candidate and a contested convention, especially if Trump did not gain the 1,237 delegates necessary to secure the nomination.

The meeting was organized by Erick Erickson, Bill Wichterman and Bob Fischer. Around two dozen people attended. Consensus was reached that Trump's nomination could be prevented and that efforts would be made to seek a unity ticket, possibly comprising Cruz and Ohio governor John Kasich.

==== Trump success in 2016 primaries ====
The candidates did not unite and Trump continued to win primaries. After Senator Ted Cruz dropped out of the race following Trump's primary victory in Indiana on May 3, 2016, Trump became the presumptive nominee while internal opposition to Trump remained as the process pivoted towards a general election.

Following unsuccessful attempts by some delegates at the Republican National Convention to block his nomination, Trump became the Republican Party's 2016 nominee for president on July 18, 2016. Some members of the Never Trump movement endorsed other candidates in the general election, such as Democratic nominee Hillary Clinton, Libertarian nominee Gary Johnson, independent conservative Evan McMullin and American Solidarity Party nominee Mike Maturen.

=== Efforts to stop nomination of Trump ===
==== By political organizations ====
Our Principles PAC and Club for Growth were involved in trying to prevent Trump's nomination. Our Principles PAC spent more than $13 million on advertising attacking Trump. The Club for Growth spent $11 million in an effort to prevent Trump from becoming the Republican Party's nominee.

==== By Republican delegates ====
In June 2016, activists Eric O'Keefe and Dane Waters formed a group called Delegates Unbound, which CNN described as "an effort to convince delegates that they have the authority and the ability to vote for whomever they want". The effort involved the publication of a book titled Unbound: The Conscience of a Republican Delegate by Republican delegates Curly Haugland and Sean Parnell. The book argues that "delegates are not bound to vote for any particular candidate based on primary and caucus results, state party rules, or even state law".

Republican delegates Kendal Unruh and Steve Lonegan led an effort among fellow Republican delegates to change the convention rules "to include a 'conscience clause' that would allow delegates bound to Trump to vote against him, even on the first ballot at the July convention". Unruh described the effort as "an 'Anybody but Trump' movement". Unruh's efforts started with a conference call on June 16 "with at least 30 delegates from 15 states". Regional coordinators for the effort were recruited in Arizona, Iowa, Louisiana, Washington and other states. By June 19, hundreds of delegates to the Republican National Convention calling themselves Free the Delegates had begun raising funds and recruiting members in support of an effort to change party convention rules to free delegates to vote however they want, instead of according to the results of state caucuses and primaries. Unruh, a member of the convention's Rules Committee and one of the group's founders, planned to propose adding the "conscience clause" to the convention's rules, effectively unhinging pledged delegates. She needed 56 other supporters from the 112-member panel, which determines precisely how Republicans select their nominee in Cleveland. The Rules Committee instead voted 87–12 to adopt rules requiring delegates to vote based on their states' primary and caucus results.

==== By individuals ====
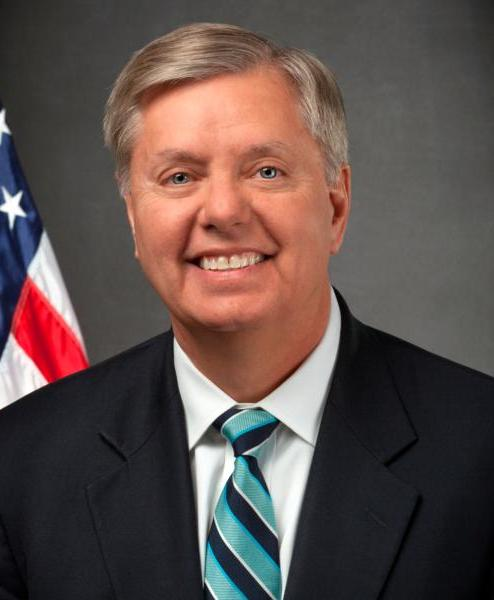
Lindsey Graham, was a Republican and 2016 presidential candidate, was an outspoken critic of fellow Republican Donald Trump's 2016 candidacy and vocalized his opposition to Trump as a candidate, publicly questioning Trump's conservatism and identity as a Republican. Over the course of the Trump presidency, however, Graham became one of Trump's supporters in the Senate.

At a luncheon in February 2016 attended by Republican governors and donors, Karl Rove discussed the danger of Trump's securing the Republican nomination by July, and that it might be possible to stop him but there was not much time left.

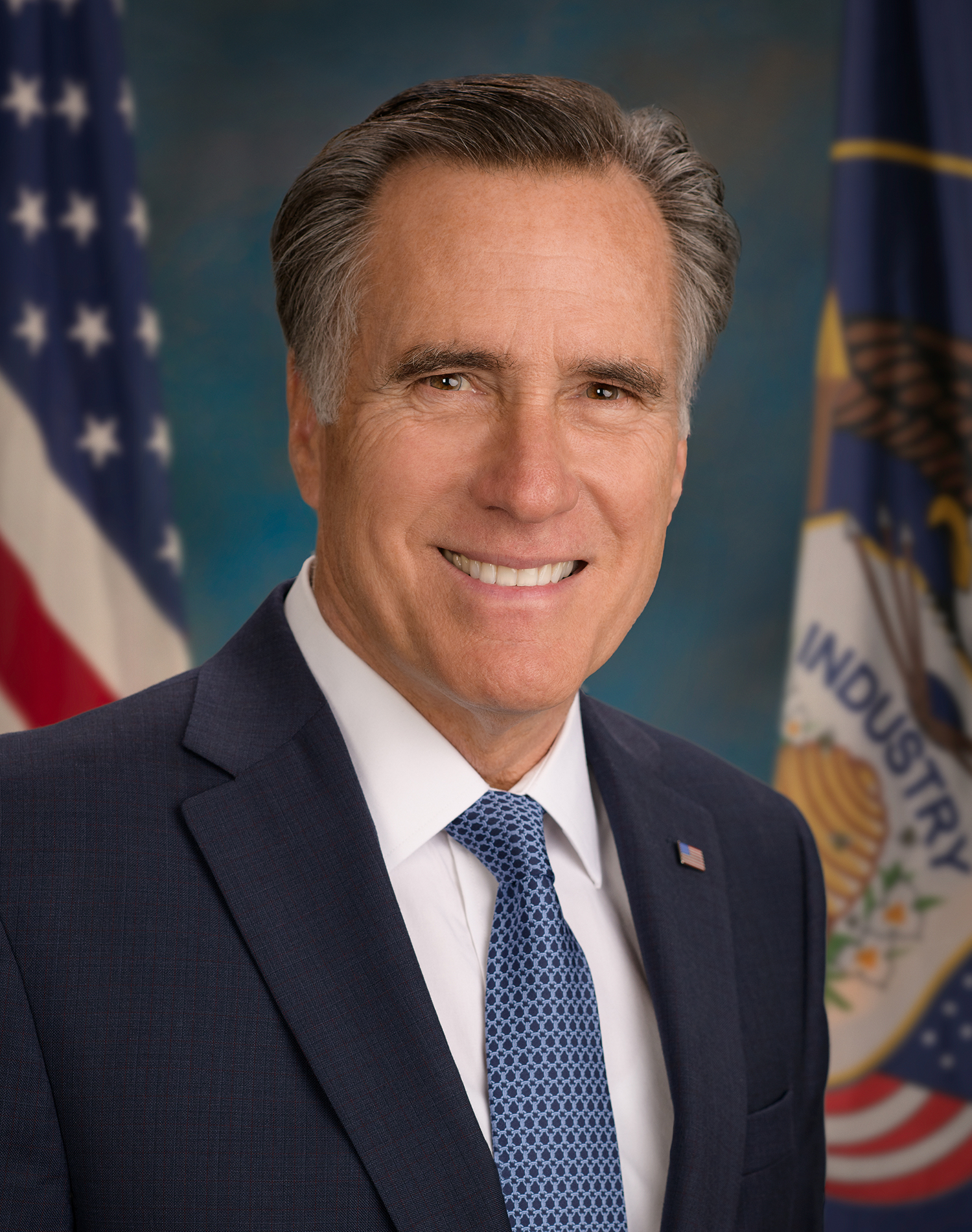
Mitt Romney was a major leader among anti-Trump Republicans until Trump won the 2016 election.

Early in March 2016, Romney, the 2012 Republican presidential nominee, directed some of his advisors to look at ways to stop Trump from obtaining the nomination at the Republican National Convention (RNC). Romney also gave a major speech urging voters to vote for the Republican candidate most likely to prevent Trump from acquiring delegates in state primaries. A few weeks later, Romney announced that he would vote for Ted Cruz in the Utah GOP caucuses. On his Facebook page, he posted: "Today, there is a contest between Trumpism and Republicanism. Through the calculated statements of its leader, Trumpism has become associated with racism, misogyny, bigotry, xenophobia, vulgarity and, most recently, threats and violence. I am repulsed by each and every one of these". Nevertheless, Romney said early on he would "support the Republican nominee", though he did not "think that's going to be Donald Trump".

Senator Lindsey Graham shifted from opposing both Ted Cruz and Trump to eventually supporting Cruz as a better alternative to Trump. Commenting about Trump, Graham said: "I don't think he's a Republican, I don't think he's a conservative, I think his campaign's built on xenophobia, race-baiting and religious bigotry. I think he'd be a disaster for our party and as Senator Cruz would not be my first choice, I think he is a Republican conservative who I could support". After Trump became the presumptive nominee in May, Graham announced he would not be supporting Trump in the general election, stating: "[I] cannot, in good conscience, support Donald Trump because I do not believe he is a reliable Republican conservative nor has he displayed the judgment and temperament to serve as Commander in Chief". Over the course of the Trump presidency, however, Graham became one of Trump's most ardent supporters in the Senate.

In October 2016, some individuals made third-party vote trading mobile applications and websites to help stop Trump. For example, a Californian who supported Clinton would instead vote for Jill Stein in exchange for a Stein supporter in a swing state voting for Clinton. The Ninth Circuit Court of Appeals in the 2007 case Porter v. Bowen established vote trading as a First Amendment right.

Republican former presidents George H. W. Bush and George W. Bush both refused to support Trump in the general election, with the elder Bush reportedly voting for Trump's rival Hillary Clinton.

==== Reactions to Stop Trump movement in the primary elections ====
Reactions to the Stop Trump movement have been mixed, with other prominent Republicans making statements in support of preventing Trump from receiving the Republican nomination. Following his withdrawal as a candidate for president, Senator Marco Rubio expressed hope that Trump's nomination could be stopped, adding that his nomination "would fracture the party and be damaging to the conservative movement".

Republican National Committee chairman Reince Priebus dismissed the potential impact of Mitt Romney's efforts to block Trump at the convention. Sam Clovis, a national co-chairman for Trump's campaign, said he would leave the Republican Party if it "comes into that convention and jimmies with the rules and takes away the will of the people". Ned Ryun, founder of conservative group American Majority, expressed concern about a contested convention, should Trump have the most delegates, but fail to reach the 1,237 necessary to be assured the nomination. Ryun speculated that a contested convention would result in Trump running as a third-party candidate, making it unlikely that Republicans would win the presidency in the November general election, adding that it would "blow up the party, at least in the short term".

New Jersey Governor Chris Christie expressed his opinion that efforts to stop Trump would ultimately fail. Relatively shortly after his endorsement of Trump, he criticized the people who condemned his endorsement, including the Stop Trump movement, saying his critics had yet to support any of the remaining Republican candidates. "I think if you're a public figure, you have the obligation to speak out, and be 'for' something, not just 'against' something. ... When those folks in the 'Stop Trump' movement actually decide to be for something, then people can make an evaluation ... if they want to be for one of the remaining candidates, do what I did: be for one of the remaining candidates."

Trump said if he were deprived of the nomination because of falling just short of the 1,237 delegates required, there could be "problems like you've never seen before. I think bad things would happen" and "I think you'd have riots". Trump made prior comments suggesting that he might run as an independent candidate if he were not to get the Republican nomination.

Roger Stone, a political consultant who served as an advisor for Trump's 2016 presidential campaign and who remains a "confidant" to Trump, put together a group called Stop the Steal and threatened "days of rage" if Republican Party leaders tried to deny the nomination to Trump at the Republican National Convention in Cleveland. Stone also threatened to disclose to the public the hotel room numbers of delegates who opposed Trump.

=== 2016 general election opposition ===
Trump was widely described as the presumptive Republican nominee after the May 3 Indiana primary, notwithstanding the continued opposition of groups such as Our Principles PAC. Many Republican leaders endorsed Trump after he became the presumptive nominee, but other Republicans looked for ways to defeat him in the general election. One potential strategy would involve an independent candidate gaining enough electoral votes to deny a majority to either of the major party candidates, sending the three presidential candidates with the most electoral votes to the House of Representatives under procedures established by the Twelfth Amendment.

Stop Trump members such as Mitt Romney, Erick Erickson, William Kristol, Mike Murphy, Stuart Stevens, and Rick Wilson pursued the possibility of an independent candidacy by a non-Trump Republican. Potential candidates included Senator Ben Sasse, Governor John Kasich, Senator Tom Coburn, Congressman Justin Amash, Senator Rand Paul, retired Marine Corps General James Mattis, lawyer Kelly A. Hyman, retired Army General Stanley McChrystal, former Secretary of State Condoleezza Rice, businessman Mark Cuban and 2012 Republican nominee Mitt Romney. However, many of these candidates rejected the possibility of an independent run, pointing to difficulties such as ballot access and the potential to help the Democratic candidate win the presidency. Gary Johnson's campaign in the Libertarian Party also attracted attention.

William Kristol, editor of The Weekly Standard, promoted National Review staff writer David A. French of Tennessee as a prospective candidate. However, French opted not to run. On August 8, Evan McMullin, a conservative Republican, announced that he would mount an independent bid for president with support of the Never Trump movement. McMullin was backed by Better for America (a Never Trump group) and supported by former Americans Elect CEO Kahlil Byrd and Republican campaign finance lawyer Chris Ashby.

Some anti-Trump Republicans said they would vote for Hillary Clinton in the general election. In late May, Craig Snyder, a former Republican staffer, launched the Republicans for Hillary PAC, "aimed at convincing Republicans to choose Hillary Clinton over ... Donald Trump in November". Grassroots efforts, like Republicans for Clinton in 2016, or R4C16, and Holding Our Noses For Hillary also joined the effort to defeat Trump.

On May 3, 2016, one of the biggest anti-Trump groups, the Never Trump PAC, circulated a petition to collect the signatures of conservatives opposed to voting for Trump in the 2016 presidential election. As of August 19, 2016, over 54,000 people had signed the petition.

==== 2016 election impact ====
Although Trump's campaign drew a substantial amount of criticism, Trump received 88 percent of the Republican vote, while Clinton won 89 percent of Democratic voters.

==== 2016 Electoral College ====
After Trump won the election, two Electoral College electors launched an effort to convince fellow electors who were allocated to Trump to vote against him.

On December 11, Jim Himes, a Democratic member of the House of Representatives, wrote on Twitter that the Electoral College should not elect Trump: "We're 5 wks from Inauguration & the President Elect is completely unhinged. The Electoral College must do what it was designed for". In a December 12 interview on CNN's New Day, Himes said he was troubled by several actions by the President-elect. The issue that "pushed [him] over the edge" was Trump's criticism of the CIA and the intelligence community. The Congressman did admit Trump won "fair and square", but he said that Trump proved himself unfit for public office. He cited the intentions behind the creation of the Electoral College and argued that it was created for an instance such as the election of Trump.

In the end, efforts to persuade more electors to vote against Trump failed and Trump won 304 electors on December 19. Trump's electoral lead over Clinton even grew because a larger number of electors defected from her: Trump received 304 of his 306 pledged electors, Clinton 227 of her 232.

=== Developments following the 2016 election ===
In a National Review article titled "Never Trump Nevermore", Jonah Goldberg stated:

I'm going to call 'em like I see 'em and wait and see if I was wrong about Trump. ... The thing is: Never Trump is over. Never Trump was about the GOP primary and the general election, not the presidency. The Left wants to claim it must be a permanent movement, denying the legitimacy of Trump's election forever, or we were never serious. Well, that's not what we—or at least I—signed up for. ... I'll say it again: I'm going to call 'em like I see 'em and wait and see if I was wrong about Trump. So far, I've said that most of his cabinet picks have been a pleasant and welcome surprise. But he's also done plenty of things that make me feel like I had him pegged all along. We only have one president at a time—and the guy isn't even president yet. I'll give him a chance. But I won't lie for him either.

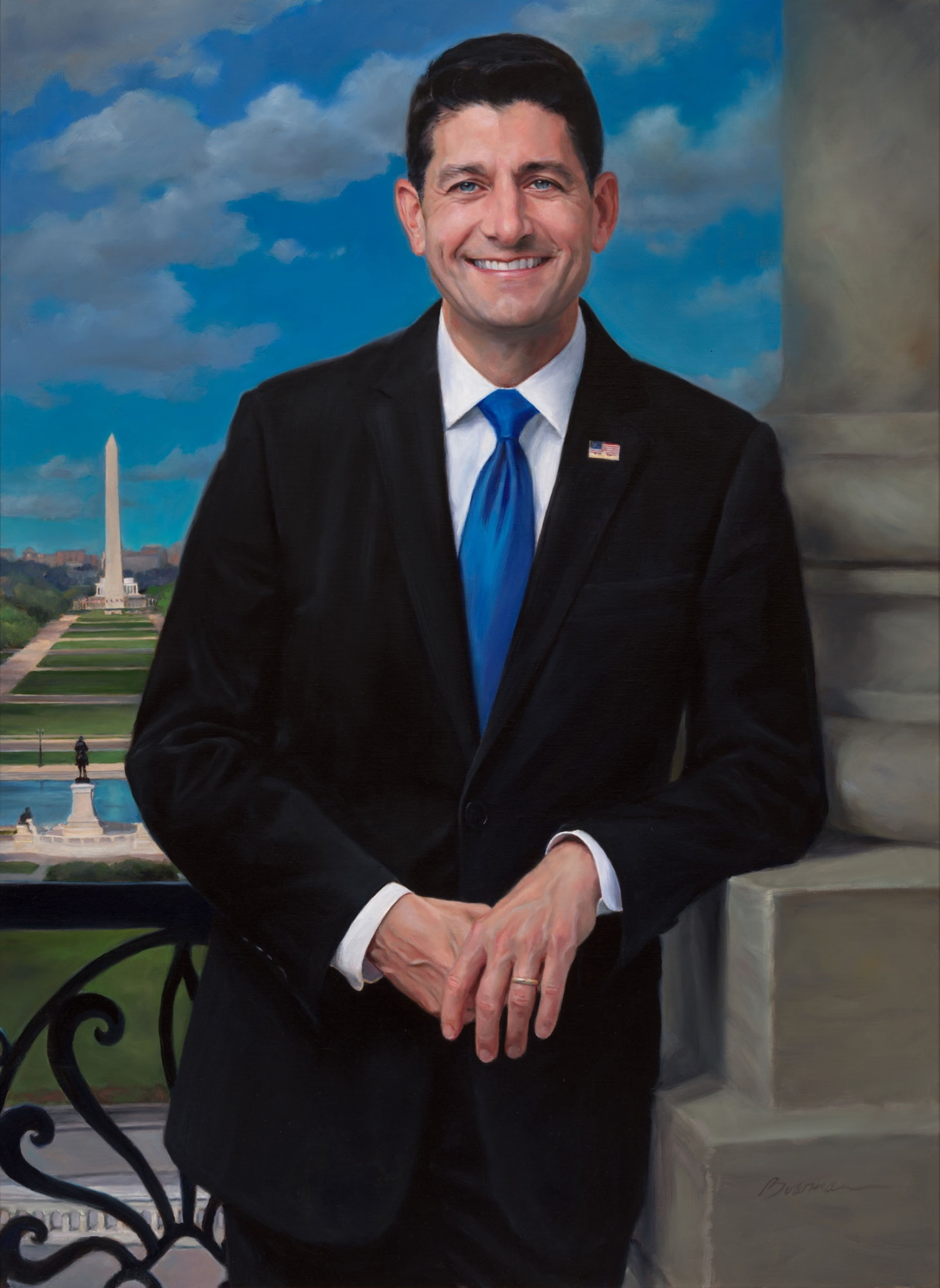
Republican and former Speaker of the U.S. House of Representatives Paul Ryan declared his opposition to Trump in 2023.

After the election, other Republicans who had resisted Trump's candidacy, such as South Carolina Senator Lindsey Graham, declared their support for his presidency. As of February 2018, Trump's job approval among self-described Republicans was at or near 90 percent.

==== Impeachment ====
In 2019, details emerged about Trump's efforts to pressure the Ukrainian government to investigate the Biden family to help Trump's re-election campaign. Democrats initiated an impeachment inquiry against Donald Trump, but, in what was a "final blow" to some Never Trumpers, Republicans were unmoved by the evidence and largely stood by Trump, leading Never Trumpers to migrate to the Democratic Party. Trump reacted by publicly characterized the witnesses in the inquiry as Never Trumpers in an effort to discredit them. In unsubstantiated statements, he has also specifically accused Ambassador to Ukraine William Taylor, National Security Council official Lt. Col. Alexander Vindman, Deputy Assistant Secretary of State for European and Eurasian Affairs George Kent, and State Department official Jennifer Williams of being Never Trumpers. When asked by Democratic House Representatives during the public impeachment hearings, Taylor, Vindman, Kent, and Williams, as well as former Ambassador Marie Yovanovitch, all denied being Never Trumpers.

On October 23, 2019, Trump tweeted: "The Never Trumper Republicans, though on respirators with not many left, are in certain ways worse and more dangerous for our Country than the Do Nothing Democrats. Watch out for them, they are human scum!"

=== 2020 election ===
Following Trump's election in November 2016, some in the movement refocused their efforts on defeating Trump in 2020. In 2019, Kelly A. Hyman, wrote the book Top Ten Reasons to Dump Trump in 2020. Also in 2019, former North Carolina Supreme Court Justice Robert F. Orr co-founded the National Republicans, who support the views of Ronald Reagan and George H. W. Bush.

Evan McMullin, who ran for president in 2016, started the group Republicans for a New President, which held The Convention on Founding Principles at the same time as the 2020 Republican National Convention. The alternative event, which included principal members of Republicans for the Rule of Law and The Lincoln Project, was primarily a virtual event due to the COVID-19 pandemic.

Numerous pundits, journalists and politicians speculated that President Donald Trump might face a significant Republican primary challenger in 2020 because of his historic unpopularity in polls, his association with allegations of Russian interference in the 2016 United States elections, his impeachment, and his support of unpopular policies.

In popular culture, political bumper stickers and yard signs expressed views like "Anyone But Trump" and "Any Functioning Adult".

After rejoining the Republican Party in January 2019, former Republican governor of Massachusetts and 2016 Libertarian vice presidential nominee Bill Weld announced the formation of a 2020 presidential exploratory committee on February 15, 2019. Weld announced his 2020 presidential candidacy on April 15, 2019. Weld was considered a long-shot challenger because of Trump's popularity with Republicans; furthermore, Weld's views on abortion rights, gay marriage, marijuana legalization, and other issues conflict with socially conservative positions dominant in the modern Republican party. Weld withdrew from the race on March 18, 2020, after Trump earned enough delegates to secure the nomination.

Former U.S. representative Joe Walsh was a strong Trump supporter in 2016, but gradually became critical of the president. On August 25, 2019, Walsh officially declared his candidacy against Trump, calling Trump an "unfit con man". He then ended his campaign on February 7, 2020, following a poor performance in the Iowa Caucuses. Walsh called the Republican Party a "cult" and said that he likely would support whoever was the Democratic nominee in the general election. According to Walsh, Trump supporters had become "followers" who think that Trump "can do no wrong", after absorbing misinformation from conservative media. He stated, "They don't know what the truth is and—more importantly—they don't care."

Former South Carolina governor and former U.S. representative Mark Sanford officially declared his candidacy on September 8, but suspended his campaign two months later on November 12, 2019, after failing to gain significant attention from voters.

Trump won every primary by wide margins and clinched the nomination shortly after the Super Tuesday primaries ended. While the results were never in doubt, the primary wasn't without controversy. Several states postponed their primaries/caucuses due to the COVID-19 pandemic, and others continued with in-person voting while Trump's false claims about fraud related to by-mail voting discouraged expansion and promotion of such voting.

=== 2024 election ===
Despite the January 6 attack on the Capitol, the repeal of Roe v. Wade, his two impeachments, felony conviction, and a poor Republican showing in the 2022 midterms, Never Trumpers now saw no home for themselves in the Republican party for the foreseeable future. The New York Times described Trump as having completed a "hostile takeover" of the Republican Party and facing meek resistance from representatives and senators for fear of Trump-backed primary challengers. It described that his "dissenters have been driven into retirement, defeated in primaries or cowed into silence". Fivethirtyeight has described the faction as "increasingly involved" in the Democratic Party where they are urging support for moderate candidate.

== Never Trumpers ==
The movement was not "a single, cohesive group or faction", but more a "coalition of convenience", of people with different policy issues. Some opposed Trump in the 2016 primaries but supported or at least didn't oppose him in the general election, some opposed him in the general election but abandoned opposition when he won and became president. Those in the national-security field were more likely to stay opponents, than officeholders, those in law (Trump appointed many conservative judges), or those in rightwing media (where opposing the Republican presidential nominee against a Democrat was much like a sports-talk host opposing the hometown team).

=== Mitt Romney ===
Mitt Romney, the Republican nominee for president in 2012, was a major leader among anti-Trump Republicans until November 9, 2016, when Donald Trump won the election. Romney re-affirmed his anti-Trump status in 2020 and 2021, when he strongly opposed Trump's attempts to overturn the 2020 presidential election, and for Trump inciting the January 6 U.S. Capitol attack in January 2021.

=== Liz Cheney ===
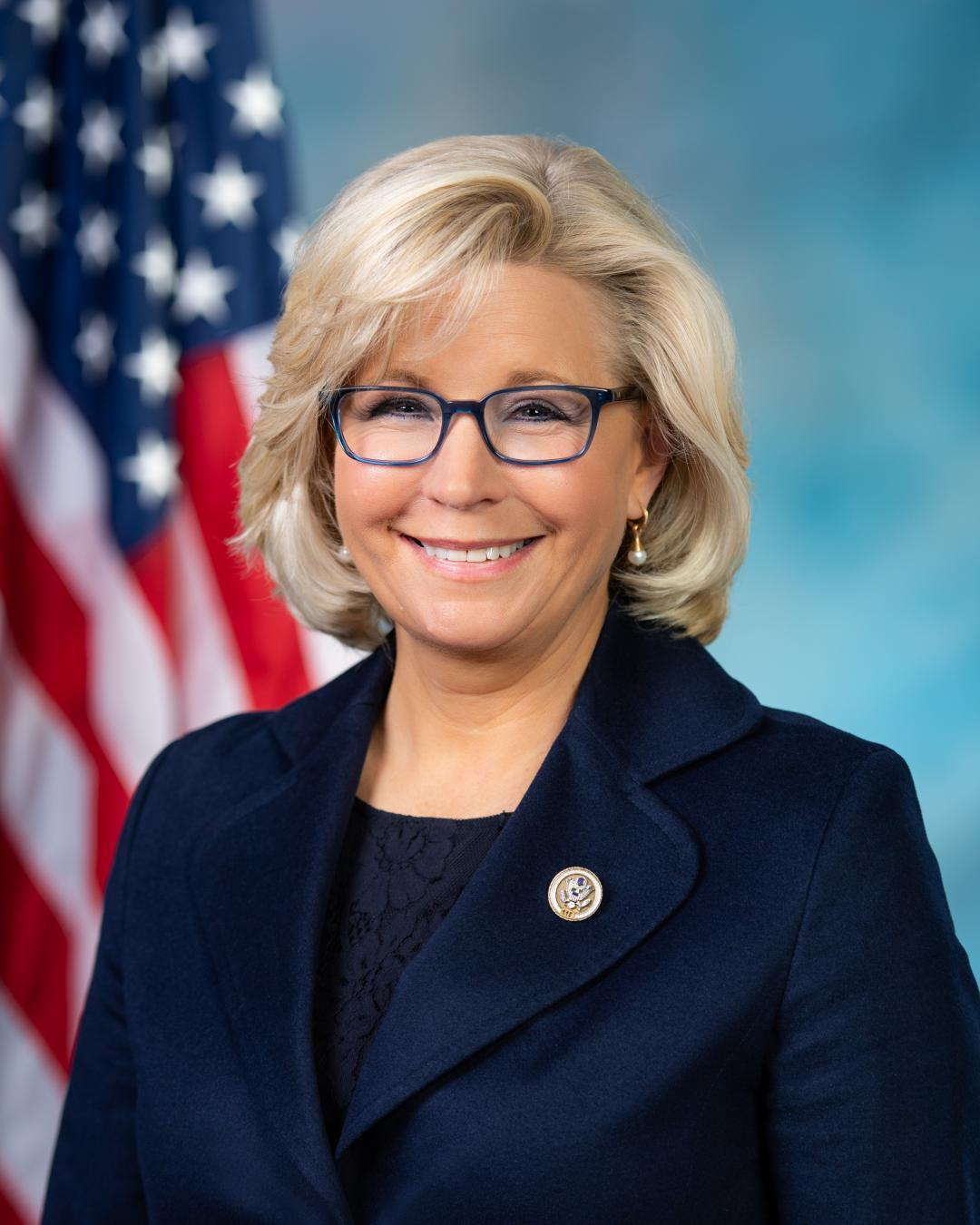
Liz Cheney, an outspoken Republican critic of Donald Trump

Since 2021, Liz Cheney has voiced opposition to President Donald Trump.

Cheney supported the second impeachment of Donald Trump following the 2021 storming of the U.S. Capitol. Following her impeachment vote and criticism of Donald Trump, pro-Trump members of the House Republican Conference attempted to remove her from party leadership. In a second attempt, this time with House Minority Leader Kevin McCarthy supporting her removal, Cheney was removed from her position in May 2021. In July 2021, Speaker Nancy Pelosi appointed Cheney to the House Select Committee on the January 6 Attack. Two months later, she was made vice chair of the committee. As a consequence of her service on the Select Committee, Cheney's membership in the Wyoming Republican Party was revoked in November 2021. She was censured by the Republican National Committee (RNC) in February 2022.

In 2022, Cheney lost renomination in Wyoming's Republican primary to Trump-endorsed Harriet Hageman in a landslide, garnering just 28.9% of the vote. Cheney has said that she intends to be "the leader, one of the leaders, in a fight to help to restore" the Republican Party. She later endorsed Kamala Harris in the 2024 presidential election, who would go on to lose all seven major swing states to Trump.

=== Republicans who left the party in opposition to the Trump administration ===
Several prominent Republicans have left the party in opposition to actions taken by the Trump administration.

- Joe Scarborough (former representative and host of MSNBC's Morning Joe)
- George Will (conservative columnist)
- Max Boot (conservative columnist)
- David Frum (commentator and George W. Bush speechwriter)
- Richard Painter (George W. Bush ethics lawyer)
- Steve Schmidt (Republican Party strategist and top George W. Bush aide)
- Jennifer Rubin (author of the "Right Turn" blog for The Washington Post)
- Colin Powell (Former United States Secretary of State)
- Joe Walsh (former representative and radio host)
- Wayne Gilchrest (former representative)
- Bill Kristol (neoconservative writer and former Chief of Staff to Dan Quayle)

=== Former Never Trumpers ===
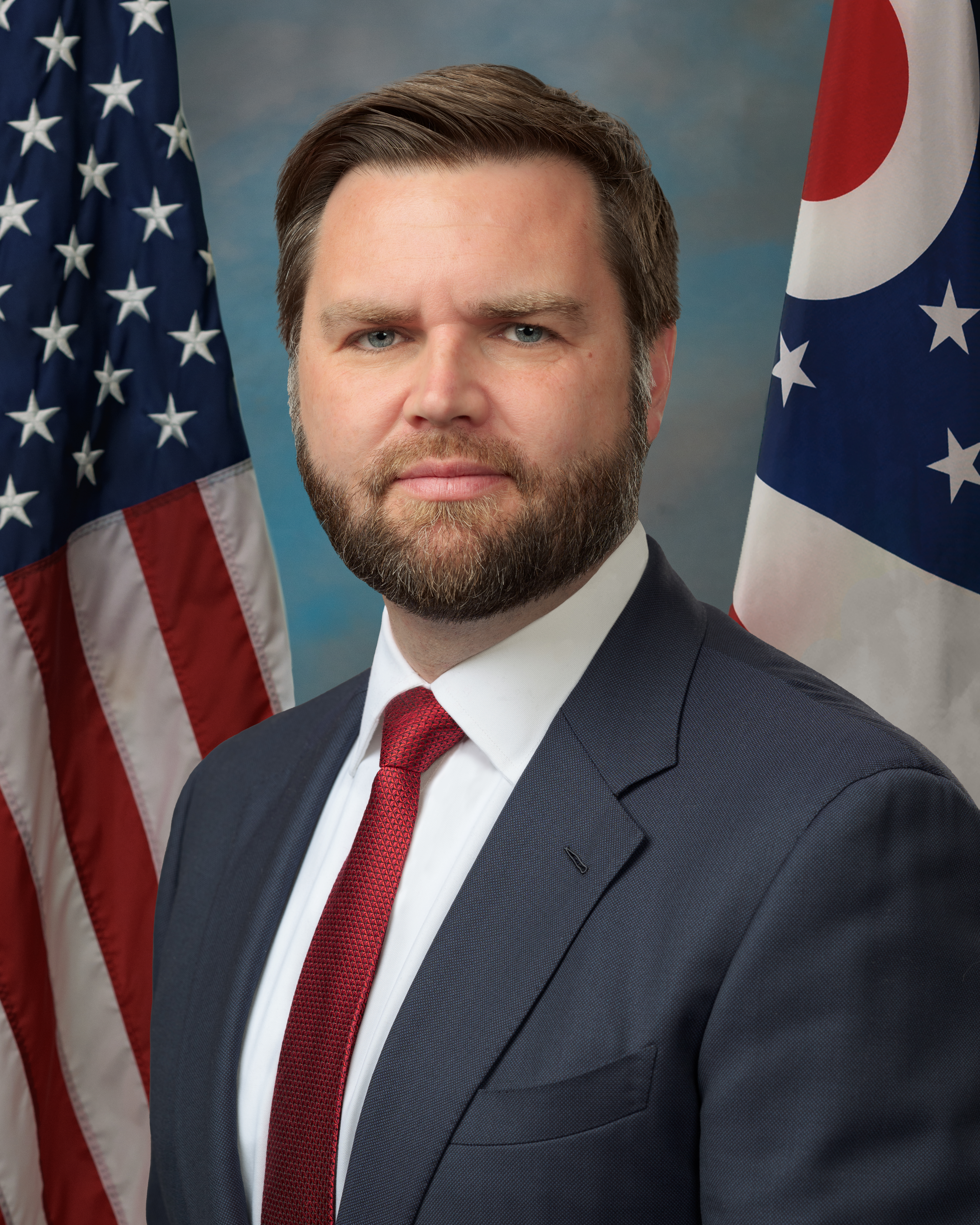
JD Vance, a Republican who used to be an outspoken critic of Donald Trump in 2016 and later became his vice president in 2025

Several prominent Republicans who once opposed Trump but who later become supporters of him are listed below.

- JD Vance (former United States senator from Ohio and currently Trump's vice president) - In 2016, Vance called himself a "never-Trump guy," and called Trump "an idiot", "reprehensible" and "America's Hitler", but in a February 2021 meeting with Trump at Mar-a-Lago, he "took the opportunity to personally apologize to Trump" for having bought "into a narrative framed by the mainstream media".
- Bernie Moreno, (United States senator from Ohio) - Moreno in 2016 described Trump as a "lunatic invading [the Republican Party]" and said he could not support a Republican Party led by "that maniac". He wrote in a tweet that he had written in a vote for Marco Rubio in the 2016 presidential election. During a 2019 radio interview, Moreno said, "there's no scenario in which I would support Trump." In 2024, he said, "I wear with honor my endorsement from President Trump."
- Lindsey Graham (United States senator from South Carolina) - Long known as a moderate Republican, Graham publicly admitted to voting against Trump, the Republican candidate for president, in the 2016 general election, and was "one of Trump’s "fiercest and most colorful critics" during that election cycle, stating, “I think he’s (Trump) a kook. I think he’s crazy. I think he’s unfit for office.” By 2017, Graham was complaining that “what concerns me about the American press is this endless, endless attempt to label the guy some kind of kook not fit to be President”.

== Principles First ==
Among the organizations of conservative opponents of Trump is "Principles First", which has held five annual gatherings of "disaffected conservatives". Its fifth conference (February 21–23, 2025, in Washington DC at the JW Marriott), had 1,200 attendees including Heath Mayo, a cofounder of the group, entrepreneur Mark Cuban, former Congressman Adam Kinzinger, former Arkansas governor Asa Hutchinson, and one Democratic Party office holder, "centrist" Jared Polis, Governor of Colorado.

The conference billed itself as an alternative to the Conservative Political Action Conference (CPAC), but also welcomed political independents and "center-left Democrats under a shared pro-democracy, anti-authoritarian" banner. However the gathering did not end with a "clear roadmap" to fight Trump, failing to achieve a consensus on whether to fight "within Republican spheres at all, migrate to the Democratic Party or find a different path altogether."

The "Summit" one month after Trump had returned to power, was notable for being "crashed" by several convicted and pardoned rioters from the 2021 attack on the U.S. Capitol, and an evacuation of the conference on its last day after anonymous death threats against some of its speakers.

The uninvited January 6 rioters shouted at and insulted four well-known police officers—Michael Fanone, Daniel Hodges, Harry Dunn, and Aquilino Gonell—who had defended the Capitol on January 6 and were in attendance at the conference. The rioters included the former leader of the Proud Boys, Enrique Tarrio, whose 22-year sentence for January 6 activities had been pardoned by the Trump administration. This "targeted harassment" by intruders was allegedly a first for the conference, but police officer Fanone told the crowd that it was only a "small taste" of what his life has been like for four years since the insurrection.

The conference was evacuated on its last day following a death threat against conference speakers John Bolton and former DC police officer Michael Fanone, both of whom had been critical of President Trump. In the Trump administration, communications director Steven Cheung quote-posted on his government account a Principles First announcement, which included pictures of the featured speakers and a link to the schedule, four days before the conference, and reposted it later.

== See also ==
- Factions in the Republican Party
- List of former first Trump administration officials who endorsed Kamala Harris
- List of former first Trump administration officials who endorsed Joe Biden
- List of Republicans who opposed the Donald Trump 2024 presidential campaign
- List of Republicans who opposed the Donald Trump 2020 presidential campaign
- List of Republicans who opposed the Donald Trump 2016 presidential campaign

=== Organizations ===
- 43 Alumni for America
- No Labels
- Republican Accountability
- Republican Political Alliance for Integrity and Reform (RePAIR)
- Right Side PAC
- The Bulwark
- The Lincoln Project
- The Resistance
