= Ivan Raiklin =

American political operative

- Occupation: Political operative
- Known for: Prominence in the election denial movement in the United States and attempts to overturn the 2020 United States presidential election
- Political party: Republican
- Movement: Far-right politics, Trumpism

Ivan Eric Raiklin is an American far-right political operative and former Army reservist.

== Early life and education ==
Ivan Raiklin was born in the United States in 1976. His father, who had been born in Leningrad, USSR, was Ernest G. Raiklin (1937–2018), and his mother is Augusta Tutunikova; the two married on October 16, 1968, in Moscow, Russia, and immigrated to the U.S. in 1974.

Ivan Raiklin studied at the University of Northern Iowa, earning two bachelor's degrees: one in Russian and Spanish languages (1997) and another in Russia and East European studies (1999), continuing for graduate studies in the Spanish language in 1999. He earned a J.D. in business, technology, and law from the Touro Law Center in 2004. In 2007 He began graduate coursework in strategic intelligence at the National Intelligence University in Washington, D.C.

== Political activities ==
He is the progenitor of the Pence card, which he tweeted to President Donald Trump on December 16, 2020 (who in turn retweeted it), which outlined a dubious legal theory to overturn the result of the 2020 U.S. Presidential election due to repeatedly refuted claims of widespread election fraud. This tweet was the precursor of the Eastman memos. The Pence card was one of a series of attempts to overturn the election.

A long-time associate of Michael Flynn, Raiklin is a former Lt.-Col. Army reservist, having served as a Green Beret, and a former employee of the Defense Intelligence Agency. A registered Republican, he failed to gather enough signatures of registered voters to qualify for the Republican primary of June 12, 2018 for the U.S. Senate to represent Virginia. He later sued both the party and the commonwealth over the ballot access denial; federal district judge John A. Gibney, Jr. denied the request inasmuch as the suit was brought too late.

An EIN Presswire press release, dated June 27, 2024, announced that Raiklin will serve on the board of directors for America's Future, a nonprofit established by Flynn.

On January 14, 2026, at the first public hearing of the United States House Judiciary Select Subcommittee to Investigate the Remaining Questions Surrounding January 6, 2021, Raiklin held up a sign with the name of a Capitol Police officer who had been falsely accused by Blaze Media of planting pipe bombs ahead of the January 6 United States Capitol attack.

On January 22, 2026, Raiklin was involved in a verbal altercation with former police officer Michael Fanone, during a recess in public testimony before the U.S. House Judiciary Committee, at a hearing in which Jack Smith was the sole witness. Fanone alleged that Raiklin had threatened to rape Fanone's wife and children. Other former officers in attendance, including Harry Dunn, attempted to pull Fanone back.

=== 2024 presidential election ===
Raiklin has been a prominent figure in the election denial movement. In the event of Trump winning a second term, the self-proclaimed "Secretary of Retribution" claims that he would use constitutional sheriffs from conservative, rural counties to conduct raids (preferably live-streamed) of Trump's enemies, of which he has a "Deep State Target List" of 350 people. The list has been in circulation in right-wing circles since January 2024. The sheriffs would purportedly deputize some 75,000 military veterans whom he claims were forced out of service because they refused to comply with COVID-19 vaccine mandates.

In October 2024, Raiklin proposed a plan, based on an extreme version of the independent state legislature theory, for Republican-controlled legislatures in Arizona, Georgia, Nebraska, New Hampshire, North Carolina, and Wisconsin to pre-emptively declare their states' electors for Trump, regardless of the outcome of the popular vote count.

Raiklin addressed an October 2024 Rod of Iron Ministries Freedom Festival, urging attendees to "confront" their state representatives with "evidence of the illegitimate steal" should Trump lose. He told attendees he was planning for a range of scenarios following the election, saying, "I have a plan and strategy for every single component of it. And then January 6 is going to be pretty fun." He added, "We run the elections. We try to play it fair. They steal it, our state legislatures are our final stop to guarantee a checkmate."

== See also ==
- Nixon's Enemies List
- Master list of Nixon's political opponents
