= Michael Fanone =

American police officer (born 1980)

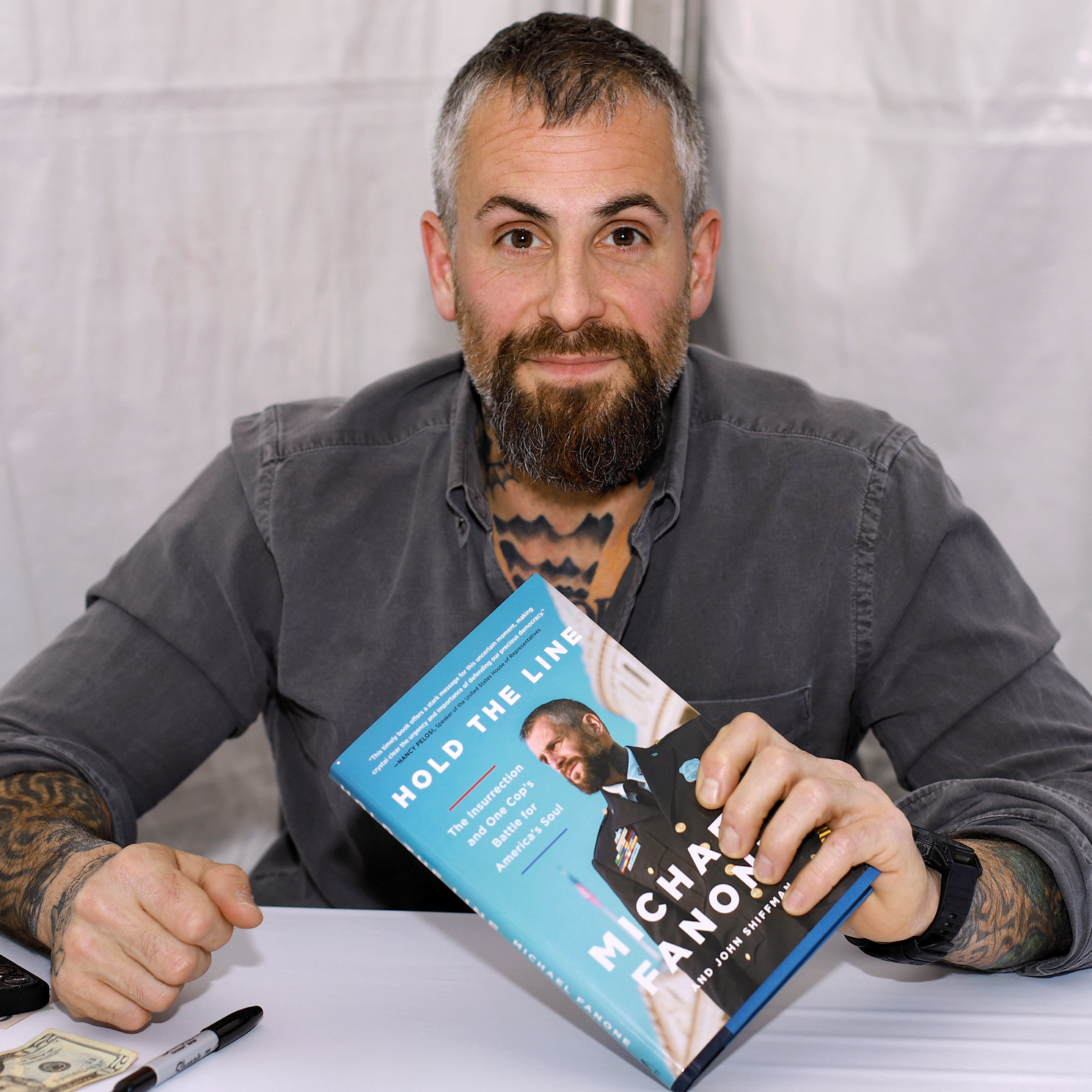
- Fanone in 2022
- Born: September 3, 1980 (age 46); Washington, D.C., U.S.
- Education: Ballou High School
- Known for: Policeman during the January 6 United States Capitol attack
- Political party: Independent
- Police career
- Country: United States
- Allegiance: District of Columbia
- Department: United States Capitol Police; Metropolitan Police Department of the District of Columbia
- Service years: 2001–2021
- Status: Retired
- Rank: Sworn in as a policeman (2001)
- Awards: Presidential Citizens Medal (2023)
- Other work: Law enforcement analyst; Author

Michael Fanone (born September 3, 1980) is an American law enforcement analyst, author, and retired policeman. He worked for the Metropolitan Police Department of the District of Columbia from 2001 until his retirement in 2021. As a police officer during the January 6, 2021 United States Capitol attack, he was violently assaulted, suffered a concussion, a heart attack, and almost died. He testified with his colleagues in front of the House Select Committee investigating the attack in 2021.

== Early life ==
Of Italian descent, Fanone was born on September 3, 1980, and raised in Alexandria, Virginia. His parents divorced when he was eight years old. Fanone attended St. Mary's Elementary School, and Georgetown Preparatory School for a year. He then attended boarding school in Maine. He left to work in construction and graduated from Ballou High School.

== Early career ==
Fanone joined the United States Capitol Police during the aftermath of the September 11 attacks. A few years later, he joined the Metropolitan Police Department of the District of Columbia, remaining a member for approximately 20 years. He worked primarily as a plain-clothes and undercover officer, investigating narcotics trafficking.

== 2021 United States Capitol attack and retirement ==
During the January 6, 2021, attack on the Capitol, Fanone, who was not scheduled to go on duty until the afternoon, self-deployed in response to radio calls for assistance. He was assaulted by rioters, dragged down the Capitol steps, beaten with pipes, stunned with a Taser, sprayed with chemical irritants, and threatened with his own gun after overt verbal abuse and physical assault from many attendees. Fanone suffered burns, a heart attack, a concussion, a traumatic brain injury, and was diagnosed with post-traumatic stress disorder as a result of the attack.

Alongside fellow officers Harry Dunn, Aquilino Gonell, and Daniel Hodges, Fanone testified before the United States House Select Committee on the January 6 Attack, in which he discussed his experiences with rioters that afternoon. In the testimony, Fanone noted:

At some point during the fighting, I was dragged from the line of officers and into the crowd. I heard someone scream—"I got one!". As I was swarmed by a violent mob, they ripped off my badge. They grabbed and stripped me of my radio. They seized ammunition that was secured to my body. They began to beat me with their fists, and what felt like hard, metal objects. At one point, I came face-to-face with an attacker, who repeatedly lunged for me and attempted to remove my firearm. I heard chanting from some in the crowd—"Get his gun!" and "Kill him with his own gun!"

In June 2021, Fanone asked Kevin McCarthy and other Republicans in Congress to denounce the January 6 conspiracies. Due to physical and emotional injuries, he returned to limited duty in September 2021, working in the technical and analytical services bureau. Fanone retired from the police force effective December 31, 2021. He was quoted by media outlets as stating that he felt he needed a change as he could no longer trust his colleagues, as it seemed some were more loyal to President Donald Trump than to the Constitution.

On June 21, 2023, Daniel Rodriguez, one of the men who had attacked Fanone with a stun gun during the riot, was sentenced to 12 1/2 years in federal prison by Judge Amy Berman Jackson. On July 28, 2023, another attacker, Thomas Sibick, was sentenced to 50 months. Sibick had been arrested in March 2021 but was released from jail that October to await trial under house arrest. However, on January 20, 2025, after beginning his second presidency, Trump pardoned over a thousand rioters, including Rodriguez and Sibick.

== CNN contributions and activism ==
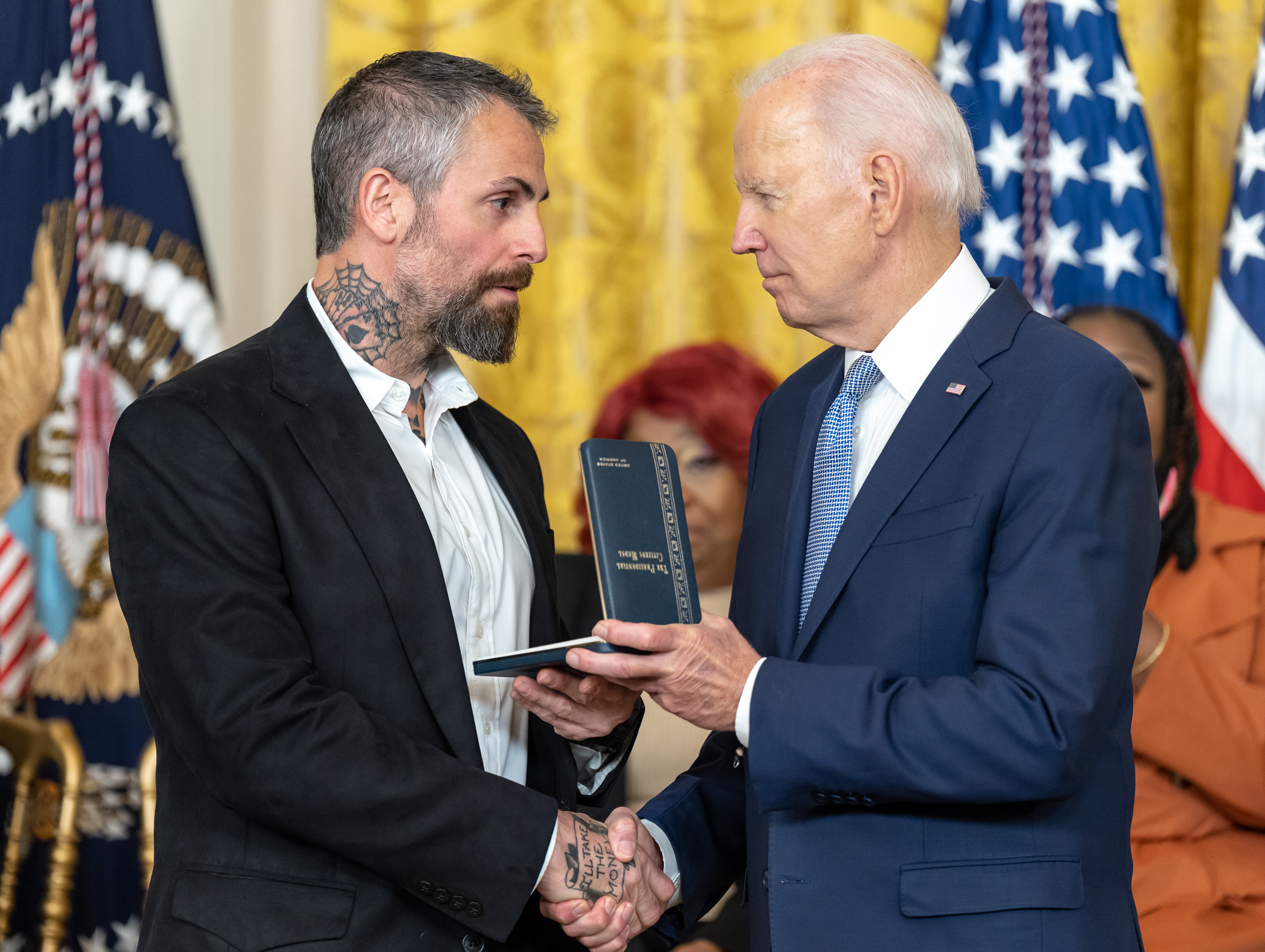
President Joe Biden presents the Presidential Citizens Medal to Fanone on January 6, 2023.

Fanone joined CNN in January 2022 as an on-air contributor and law enforcement analyst and concluded his time with the network in November 2023.

Ahead of the second anniversary of the January 6 United States Capitol attack, Fanone wrote a letter, signed by more than 1,000 veterans, law enforcement, active military members and family, calling on Republican leadership in the United States House of Representatives to denounce political violence. The letter was hand-delivered by military veterans to top Republican leaders, and Fanone delivered a copy of the letter to the office of Rep. Marjorie Taylor Greene. Fanone and dozens of military veterans, including House members Reps. Jason Crow, Chrissy Houlahan, Mikie Sherrill, and Chris Deluzio, also spoke at a rally in front of the United States Capitol, which was organized by the groups Courage for America and Common Defense.

On January 6, 2023, Fanone was awarded the Presidential Citizens Medal by President Joe Biden.

In August 2023, Fanone wrote an op-ed for CNN in which he called for a ban on AR-15 rifles.

In February 2025, Fanone spoke at the Principles First conference, an alternative to the Conservative Political Action Conference (CPAC), where he expressed outrage at the pardon of the January 6th rioters. At the event, Fanone and several Capitol officers were confronted by Enrique Tarrio, a Proud Boys leader involved in the January 6th attack. Tarrio accused the officers of being "cowards", to which Fanone responded by calling Tarrio a traitor.

On January 22, 2026, Fanone confronted conservative activist and conspiracy theorist Ivan Raiklin during a hearing featuring former special counsel Jack Smith, accusing Raiklin of threatening Fanone's family, including threatening to rape his children. Later in the hearing, Fanone coughed into his hands and appeared to say "go fuck yourself" as Representative Troy Nehls blamed Capitol Police rather than Trump for the events of January 6.

== Personal life ==
Fanone is divorced and has four daughters. While estranged from his ex-wife prior to the January 6 attack, he described her as "a pretty integral part of [his] support system" since the attack.

As of 2021, he lives in Virginia with his mother. Fanone was formerly a supporter of Donald Trump and voted for him in the 2016 United States presidential election, but stopped supporting him after his dismissal of James Comey and after comments he made that he perceived to be anti-Asian.

== Bibliography ==
- Fanone, Michael; Shiffman, John (2022). Hold the Line: The Insurrection and One Cop's Battle for America's Soul. Simon and Schuster. ISBN 978-1-6680-0719-8.
