= Our Principles PAC =

Political action committee

Our Principles PAC was a super PAC established in January 2016 as part of the Never Trump movement. Its goal was to oppose Donald Trump's campaign for president. Our Principles PAC was led by Katie Packer, who was deputy campaign manager of Mitt Romney's 2012 campaign. The month of the Iowa caucuses, the group sent out mailers to voters in the state, attacking Trump. In March, it released a video attacking Trump, featuring women reading some of his sexist statements about women.

During the 2016 presidential election campaign, New York-based hedge fund billionaire Paul Singer, whose corporation Elliott Management Corporation (EMC) specializes in distressed debt acquisitions, was one of the group's donors. Singer supported Marco Rubio.
