= Mitt Romney's 2016 anti-Trump speech =

American political denunciation speech

- Part of 2016 Republican Party presidential primaries
- Mitt Romney speaking at the University of Utah on March 3, 2016
- Date: March 3, 2016
- Time: 9:30 a.m. (MST)
- Duration: 20 minutes
- Venue: Libby Gardner Hall, University of Utah
- Location: Salt Lake City, Utah, U.S.; 40.765010°N 111.843057°W
- Type: Speech
- Theme: Anti-Trumpism
- Patron: Hinckley Institute of Politics Forum
- Outcome: Trump nominated and elected Romney later elected senator, voted to convict Trump twice in impeachment trials.

On March 3, 2016, U.S. Republican politician Mitt Romney delivered a major speech for the Hinckley Institute of Politics at the Libby Gardner Hall in the University of Utah. In that speech, he denounced Donald Trump, who was then the front-runner in the 2016 Republican Party presidential primaries. He urged citizens to use tactical voting in the remaining primaries and caucuses to maximize the chance of denying Trump a delegate majority.

Romney's speech represented an almost unprecedented attack by a major U.S. party's most recent presidential nominee against the party's current front-runner for the nomination. Trump dismissed the comments, criticizing Romney for his losses in the 2008 and 2012 presidential elections and for "working with the establishment." Two months after the speech, Trump secured the Republican Party's presidential nomination and subsequently won the general election to become the president of the United States.

== Background ==
Romney was the Republican nominee in the 2012 United States presidential election. After he lost the election to Barack Obama, he decided not to run again for president in 2016. Instead, he initially decided to play a sideline role in the election. He grew frustrated with Trump's campaign platform and his rise in popularity. In January, Romney considered doing an interview to point out Trump's flaws. Romney's former campaign advisers told him that such an attack on Trump would likely backfire, and Romney decided against it. Romney viewed Trump's apparent failure to disavow former Ku Klux Klan leader David Duke in a CNN interview as the final straw, and decided to speak out.

== Speech ==
=== Announcement ===
In a press release issued on March 2, 2016, Mitt Romney announced he would address the "state of the 2016 presidential race". The speech, scheduled to be delivered at the University of Utah's Libby Gardner Hall and hosted by the Hinckley Institute of Politics Forum was described by sources with advanced knowledge of its content as a chance to criticize Trump's progress toward the Republican Party's 2016 presidential nomination. Romney had initiated a targeted attack against Donald Trump via media interviews and written statements in the days preceding the speech, criticizing Trump for not releasing his tax returns and predicting "bombshells" were hidden in the documents. (Note: The New York Times reported on its contents in September 2020.)

The following morning, on March 3, Romney released excerpts from the planned speech to some media outlets.

=== Speculations regarding purpose ===
Although Romney began the speech by expressly disavowing any intention to seek the 2016 Republican nomination himself, several media outlets theorized that the speech was intended to inject Romney back into the national discussion in an effort to introduce him as a compromise candidate during the 2016 Republican National Convention, should Trump not obtain a majority of votes on the first ballot and a contested convention result. Following the speech, online betting site PredictIt saw a spike in wagers that Romney would eventually be a candidate for president, with a seven-fold increase in oddsmaking on the prospect.

=== Content ===
The speech, which was delivered on March 3 several hours before a GOP presidential debate, lasted approximately twenty minutes. Romney used the address, a targeted critique of Donald Trump, to declare that the candidate's promises were "worthless", describe him as a "fraud", and claim that "he's playing the American public for suckers: he gets a free ride to the White House and all we get is a lousy hat." Romney went on to predict that Trump would be handily defeated by Hillary Clinton in the general election, should he receive the Republican nomination, and criticized Trump for calling George W. Bush a liar. Romney encouraged Republicans to engage in tactical voting, by supporting whichever of the three remaining rivals – Ted Cruz, Marco Rubio, or John Kasich – had the best chance to beat Trump in any given state, thus increasing the chance that Trump would be unable to gain a majority of all delegates selected.

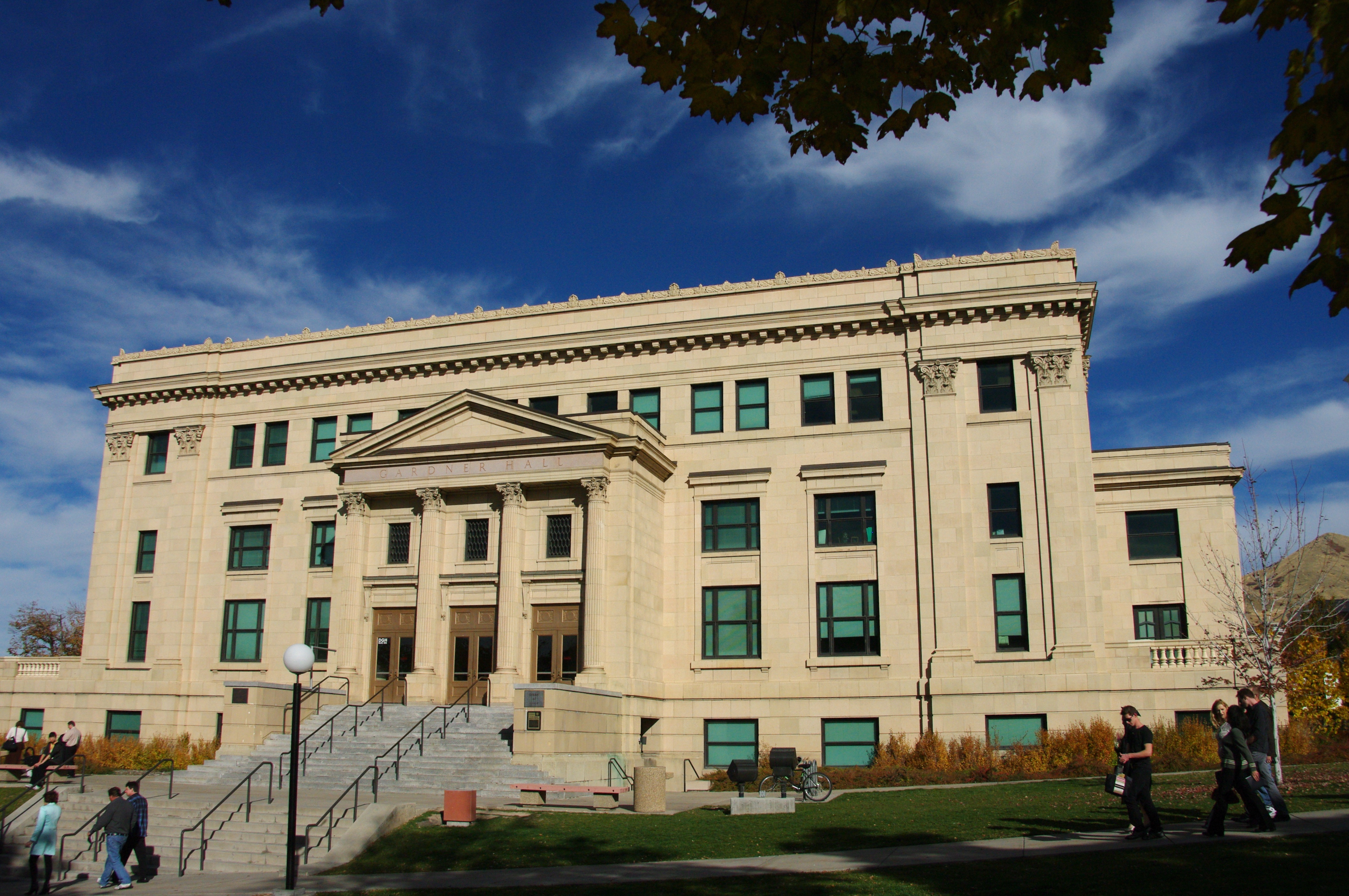
Romney's March 3 speech was delivered at the Gardner Hall in the University of Utah.

== Historic nature ==
As an attack by a major U.S. party's presidential nominee against the party's front-runner for the nomination, Romney's speech had few precedents in American history. There was also little precedent for a major party figure such as Romney urging a course of action that would lead to a contested convention. The speech was considered evidence that the Republican Party had fallen into an internal schism.

Jonathan Martin of The New York Times wrote, "Mitt Romney's political assault on Donald J. Trump on Thursday was so savage that historians strained to recall any precedent in American politics, with a major party's former nominee blistering his party's leading presidential candidate in such a personal and sweeping fashion." Historians pointed to two instances: Theodore Roosevelt harshly criticizing William Howard Taft on a personal basis when Roosevelt split from the Republicans, and the erstwhile friends ran against each other in the 1912 U.S. presidential election, and Al Smith, the Democratic nominee in the 1928 U.S. presidential election, strongly denouncing Democratic President Franklin D. Roosevelt and the New Deal in a 1936 speech before the American Liberty League; Neither instance was thought to be truly comparable to Romney's denunciation of Trump.

== Reaction ==
=== Donald Trump ===
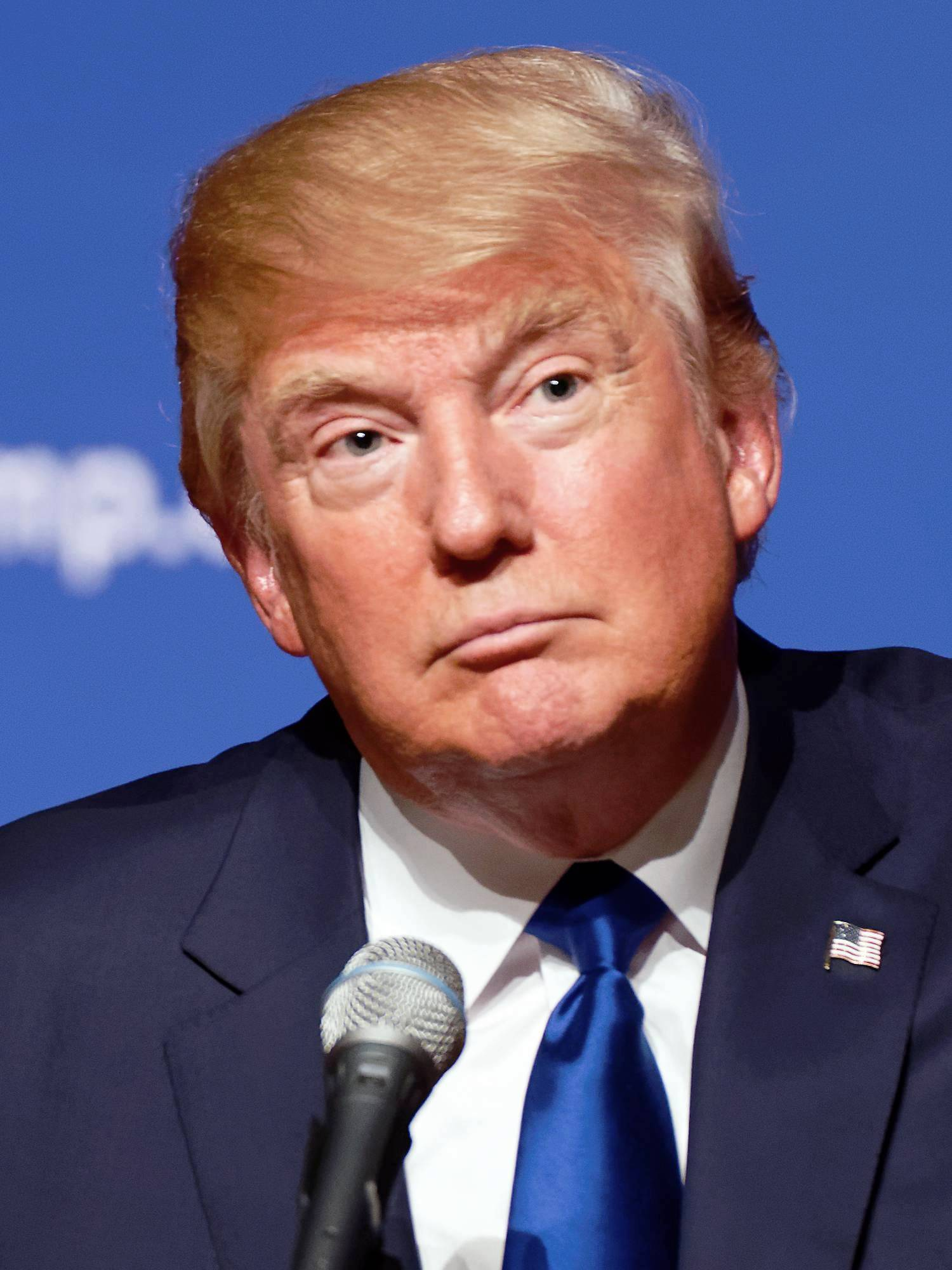
Donald Trump, pictured on August 19, 2015

Donald Trump responded to Romney's initial press release scheduling the speech by describing it, in a post to his Twitter account, as "another desperate move by the man who should have easily beaten Barrack [sic] Obama". On March 3, the morning of the speech, Trump telephoned the Today Show and attacked Romney as a "stiff" who "failed twice" as a presidential candidate.

Following the speech, Trump immediately responded with what Politico described as "withering scorn," dismissing Romney as a "choke artist." At a campaign rally in Portland, Maine, Trump told supporters, in reference to the 2012 presidential election, "I backed Mitt Romney. He was begging for my endorsement. I could have said 'Mitt, drop to your knees.' He would have dropped to his knees." In messages posted to his Twitter account, Trump went on to describe Romney as a "failed candidate" who was "working with the establishment". Trump continued to mock Romney's speech in late May, saying: "He walks like a penguin onto the stage. Like the penguin!"

=== Others ===
==== Audience ====
Romney's speech was met with applause several times.

While delivering the speech, Romney was heckled, after which his supporters chanted his first name and the heckler was escorted out.

==== Activists and analysts ====
- Former Republican National Committee chairman Michael Steele questioned whether Romney's speech would have any impact at all. Commenting on Romney's 2012 presidential bid, Steele noted that "Romney lost three million Republicans, who didn't even bother to show up and vote for him because they did not support his campaign. So now to double back and to go after the very guy who has brought them back into the party ... I don't understand what they think is going to happen here."
- In an online editorial for Fox News, veteran conservative commentator Jonah Goldberg applauded Romney's speech as "lucid, morally compelling, factually and analytically correct in every way".
- Matt Schlapp, president of the American Conservative Union, reacted to Romney's speech by saying that "it's strange to see people all of a sudden become animated when they are against somebody that 40 percent of the voters, at least in the Republican primaries, seem to be standing for."
- Eric Trump, in a statement posted to social media, criticized Romney for not showing more loyalty to his (Eric Trump's) father. Donald Trump had endorsed Romney during the 2012 U.S. presidential election; at the time, Romney praised Trump's business savvy.
- Roger Stone, a political strategist and Trump supporter, said after the speech that "being called a phony by Mitt Romney is like being called ugly by a frog".

==== Elected officials ====
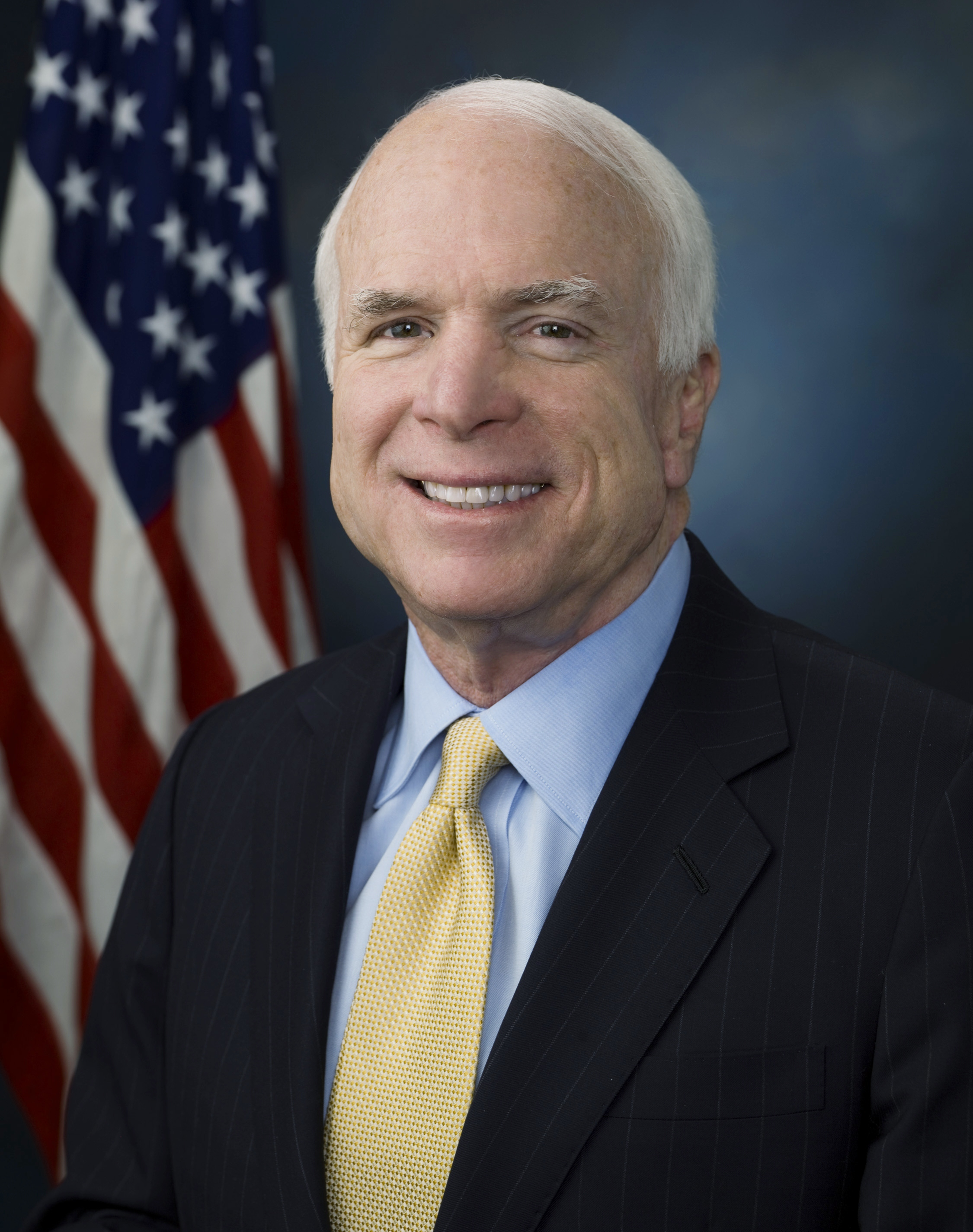
John McCain, another unsuccessful Republican presidential candidate, said he shared Romney's concerns about Donald Trump.

- Senator John McCain released a statement following the speech in which he said "I share the concerns about Donald Trump that my friend and former Republican nominee, Mitt Romney, described." McCain had been the Republican presidential nominee before Romney, in the 2008 U.S. presidential election, and his siding with Romney emphasized the unprecedented nature of the intra-party strife.
- In an interview with Katie Couric, presidential candidate Ben Carson said he did not believe Romney's speech was helpful and criticized it for being overly negative.
- Utah Governor Gary Herbert, who attended Romney's speech, said there was "room to criticize" Trump and that Romney "hit it out of the park".
- Speaker of the U.S. House of Representatives Paul Ryan, who was Romney's running mate in 2012 and who had dined with Romney prior to the speech, declined to comment on it, or Trump, afterwards, saying he sought to remain politically neutral so as not to compromise his position as chairman of the Republican National Convention.

==== Media ====
- In an analysis of the speech, Politico observed that the speech was "a stirring call to arms for a strategic-voting retreat".
- Following the speech, The Washington Post concluded that "being attacked by Romney is more likely to cement Trump's hold on the nomination than loosen his grip on it".
- Fortune opined that Romney's speech would be largely ineffective, noting that "it won't matter a lick to Trump’s supporters. If anything, the denunciation of two-time presidential election loser Mitt Romney may make them even more likely to go out and vote for Trump."

==== Social media ====
On Twitter, users posted about Romney approximately 38 times per second immediately following the speech, with positive comments about Romney slightly eclipsing those for Trump.

==== Popular culture ====
In the March 5, 2016, episode of Saturday Night Live, Jason Sudeikis made a guest appearance portraying Mitt Romney in a sketch set-up as an interview between Romney and CNN's Jake Tapper (played by Beck Bennett). In the sketch, Sudeikis' Romney entered the scene by announcing "that's right, America, I'm back. You didn't ask for it, but you've got it."

== Effects ==
Two days after the speech, Cruz showed strength in the March 5 contests, winning decisive victories in the Kansas and Maine caucuses while coming a close second to Trump in the Kentucky caucuses and Louisiana primary. Whether this could be attributed to the effect of Romney's speech was difficult to determine. In the March 8 primaries, Trump won three states of four, and subsequent primaries into April showed a mixed pattern, with some key Cruz victories being followed by just as important Trump victories.

A Morning Consult poll conducted March 4–6 found that 31 percent of Republicans in fact considered themselves more likely to vote for Trump given Romney's speech, compared to only 20 percent who said they were less likely. On March 8, Romney appeared as a guest on Jimmy Kimmel Live and called for Trump to drop out of the race altogether.

Scattered instances of Romney's proposed tactical voting occurred after this, including suggestions by Rubio shortly before March 15 results forced his withdrawal from the race. Romney announced his own instance of tactical voting on March 19 by saying he was voting for, although not endorsing, Cruz for president in the March 22 Utah caucus. He said of Kasich, "I would have voted for him in Ohio. But a vote for Governor Kasich in future contests makes it extremely likely that Trumpism would prevail." Cruz ended up winning the Utah contest by a very large margin.

Before the New York primary, with the race Cruz, Kasich, and Trump, Romney stated that keeping the race between three people would likely give Trump the nomination on the first ballot of the convention. Romney's original vision was formally fulfilled on April 24, when Cruz and Kasich announced an alliance of convenience whereby Kasich would stop campaigning for the following month's Indiana primary and Cruz would do the same for contests in Oregon and New Mexico. As NPR wrote, "It took them nearly two months to do so, but John Kasich and Ted Cruz are finally taking Mitt Romney's advice." In the May 3 Indiana primary, Trump won a majority of the vote and all of the delegates. Cruz dropped out of the presidential race that night and Kasich followed the next day, making Trump the presumptive nominee of the Republican Party.

In reaction to the outcome, Romney declared that he would not support Trump, saying, "I am dismayed at where we are now, I wish we had better choices, and I keep hoping that somehow things will get better, and I just don't see an easy answer from where we are." Romney also said he would not attend the Republican convention.

Efforts among the Stop Trump movement continued, however. In late May, pundit and publisher William Kristol said that Romney was "thinking seriously" about mounting a third-party run for the White House. But Romney ruled himself out several times, although he indicated that he would support a third-party candidate and was considering Libertarian Party candidate Gary Johnson and his running mate William Weld.

== See also ==
- 2016 Republican Party presidential candidates
- List of Republicans who opposed the Donald Trump 2016 presidential campaign
- False or misleading statements by Donald Trump
- Too Much and Never Enough
