= Harry Dunn (police officer) =

American former police officer (born 1983)

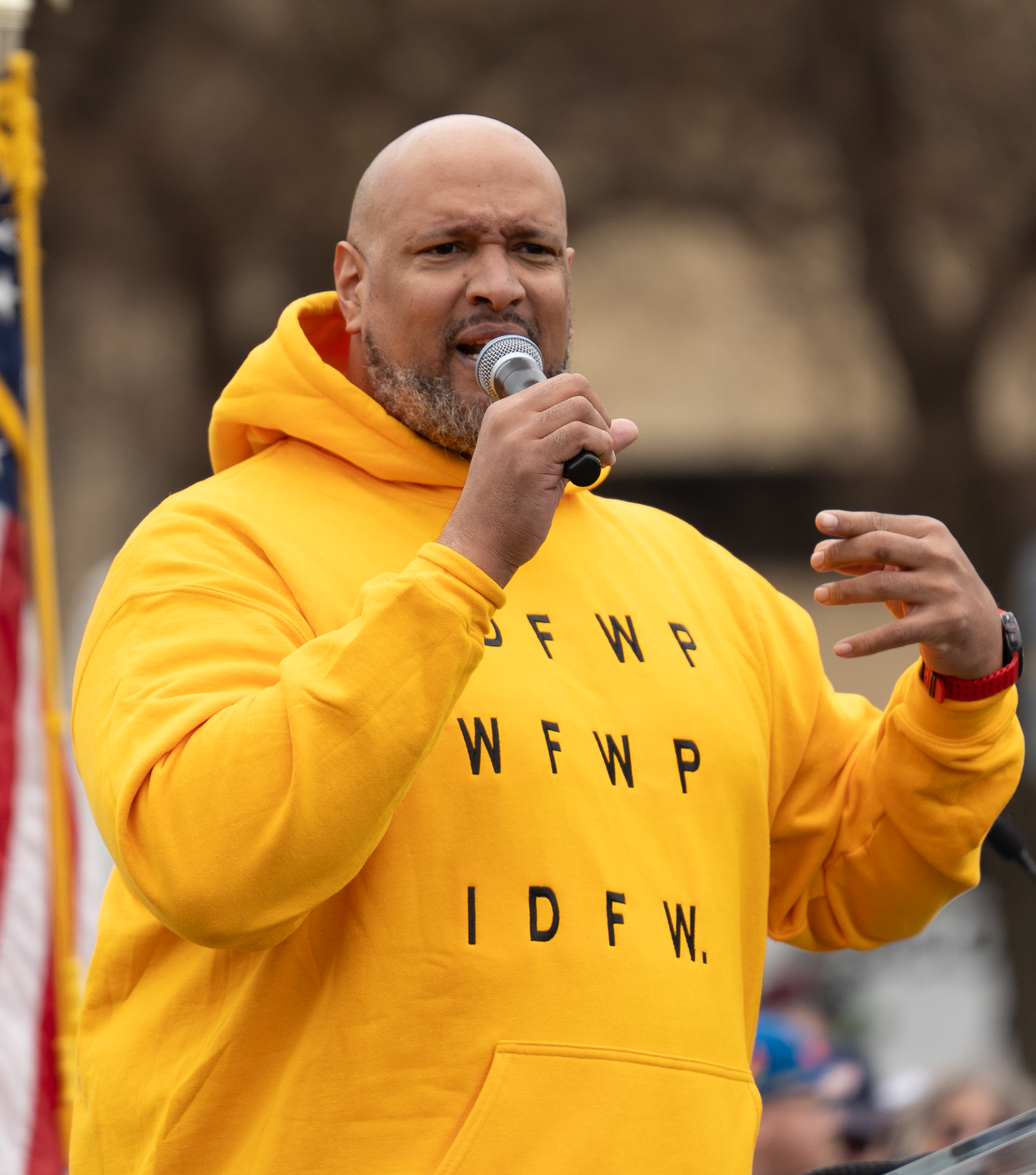
- Dunn in 2025
- Born: Harry Anthony Dunn; September 25, 1983 (age 42); Andrews Air Force Base, Maryland, U.S.
- Education: James Madison University (BS)
- Known for: Police officer during the January 6 United States Capitol attack
- Political party: Democratic
- Spouse: Danyel Moncree (m. 2009, divorced)
- Children: 1
- Awards: Congressional Gold Medal (2021); Presidential Citizens Medal (2023)
- Police career
- Department: United States Capitol Police
- Service years: 2008–2023
- Rank: Private first class
- Dunn's voice Dunn on his experience as a U.S. Capitol Police officer and during the January 6 Capitol attack Recorded June 24, 2022
- Website: Campaign website

Harry Anthony Dunn (born September 25, 1983) is an American author, former police officer, and former political candidate who served in the United States Capitol Police from 2008 to 2023. Dunn was one of several officers present during the attack on the U.S. Capitol on January 6, and testified with his colleagues before the United States Congress for the House Select Committee investigating the attack. His efforts have earned him both the Congressional Gold Medal and Presidential Citizens Medal.

A member of the Democratic Party, Dunn ran for Maryland's 3rd congressional district in the 2024 election, in which he was defeated by Sarah Elfreth in the Democratic primary. He ran for Maryland's 5th congressional district in 2026, losing to Adrian Boafo in the Democratic primary.

== Early life and career ==
Dunn was born on Andrews Air Force Base in Morningside, Maryland. He attended Surrattsville High School in Clinton, Maryland, and played as an offensive lineman on the school's football team. Dunn attended James Madison University, where he studied public health and played college football for the James Madison Dukes. He was a member of the 2004 NCAA Division I-AA national champions. Dunn graduated from James Madison in 2005. After he graduated, Dunn signed with the Montreal Alouettes of the Canadian Football League, but he was released during training camp.

Dunn joined the United States Capitol Police in 2008. From 2009 to 2023, he worked as a first responder providing security around the exterior of the United States Capitol and as a member of the Capitol Police Crisis Negotiation Team. He was commissioned as an officer as a private first class in 2011, and was named a field training officer in 2017. In November 2021, Dunn ran against Gus Papathanasiou in an election to chair the U.S. Capitol Police Labor Committee. Papathanasiou defeated Dunn in a secret ballot.

== January 6 Capitol attack ==
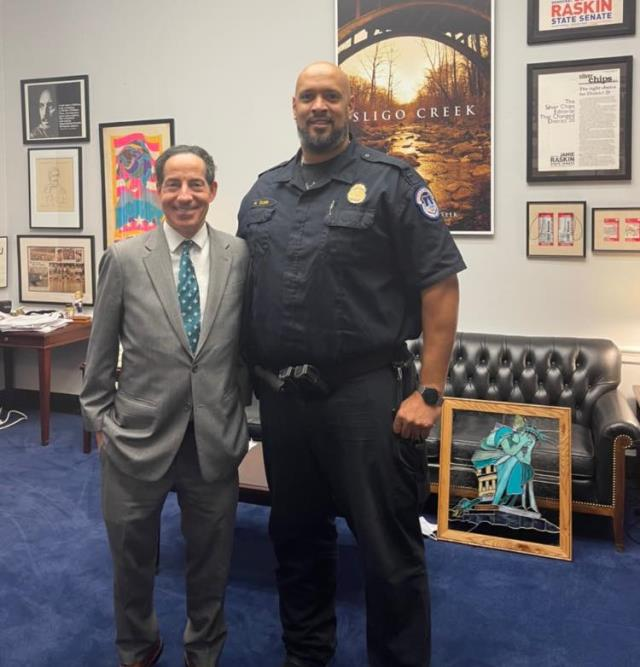
Dunn with U.S. Representative Jamie Raskin in June 2021

On the day of the January 6 United States Capitol attack, Dunn was stationed outside the Capitol. After the Capitol was breached, he was called inside to guard a stairwell with injured officers and to guard Speaker Nancy Pelosi's office. He interacted with rioters, many carrying Make America Great Again and Confederate flags, and members of the Oath Keepers such as Kelly Meggs. Dunn said that by the end of the day, his fists were bloody from fighting with rioters.

Dunn, D.C. Metropolitan Police Officer Michael Fanone, and Gladys Sicknick, the mother of the late Brian Sicknick, advocated for the creation of a January 6 commission, to investigate the attack in a method similar to the 9/11 Commission in meetings with U.S. Senators of the Republican Party. He was in attendance when the U.S. House approved the formation of the United States House Select Committee on the January 6 Attack. He testified to the committee alongside Fanone, Capitol Police Sergeant Aquilino Gonell, and D.C. Metropolitan Police Officer Daniel Hodges in its preliminary hearing on July 27, 2021. In his testimony, Dunn said that rioters had used racial slurs against him during the attack and that he has attended psychotherapy and engaged in peer support to help him process the trauma he experienced. The four officers were given a front-row seat to all of the committee's public hearings in 2022. Dunn has stated that Donald Trump should be arrested for his conduct preceding the riot.

Dunn testified in the 2022 trial of the Oath Keepers for seditious conspiracy for their actions relating to the Capitol attack. Though they claimed that they were trying to assist the officers during the attack, Dunn refuted their claims. The trial resulted in the convictions of Meggs and Stewart Rhodes.

Dunn wrote a memoir, titled Standing My Ground, which was published on October 24, 2023, by Hachette Books. He resigned from the Capitol Police on December 17, 2023.

=== Legal actions related to January 6 ===
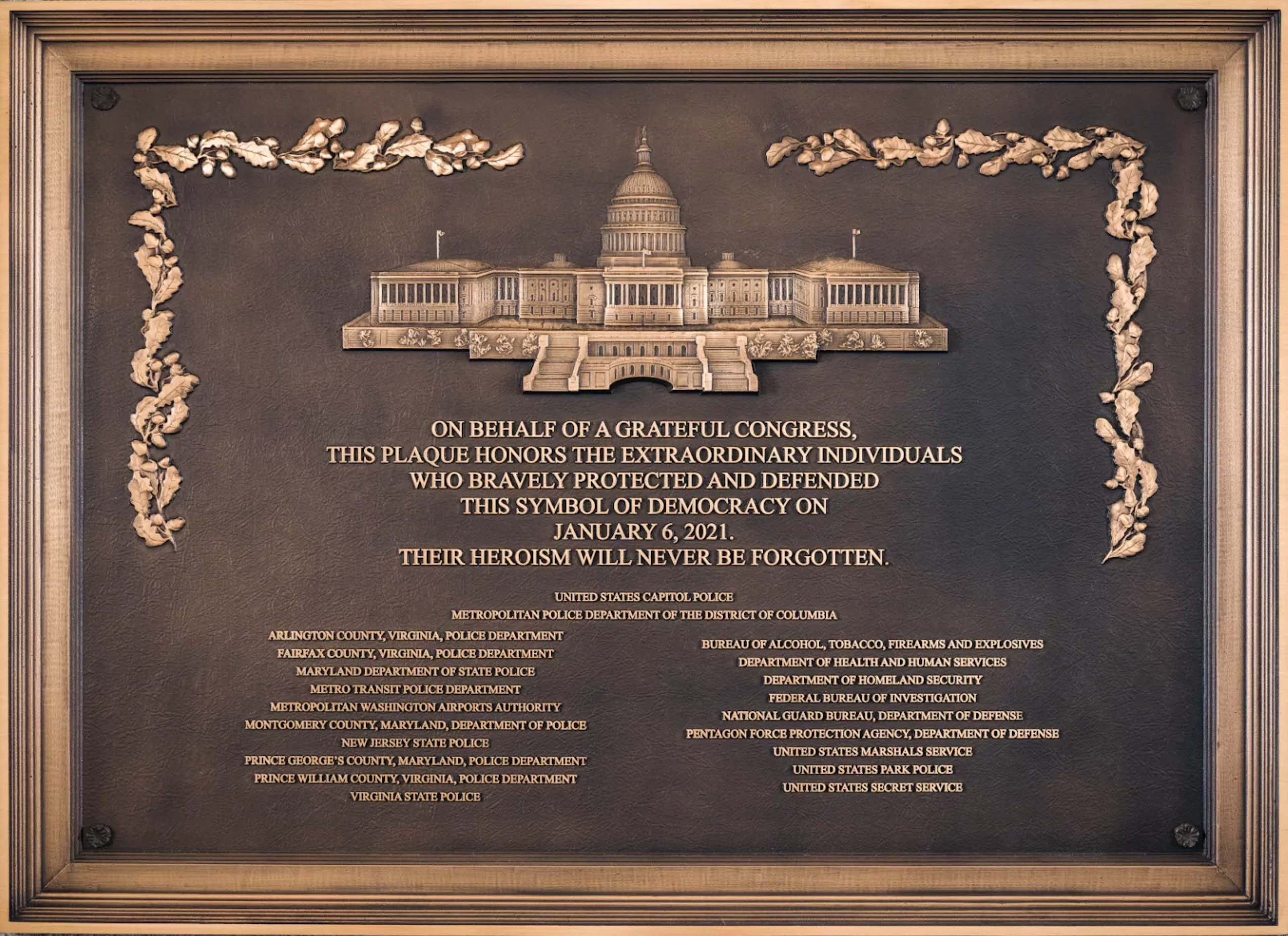
A commemorative plaque honoring those who protected the US Capitol on January 6 sat for years out of sight in the Capitol basement, surrounded by maintenance equipment. A 2022 law mandating the plaque stated it must be placed "at a permanent location on the western front". After Dunn and D.C. police officer Daniel Hodges sued, the plaque was placed on a wall inside the Capitol more than five years after the attack, in an area closed to all tours and accessible by visitors only if they are escorted.

In May 2026, Dunn and D.C. Metropolitan Police Officer Daniel Hodges filed a federal lawsuit in the District of Columbia seeking to dissolve the Trump administration's Anti-Weaponization Fund, a $1.776 billion fund created as part of a settlement of a lawsuit brought by Trump against the IRS over the alleged leaking of his tax returns. Dunn and Hodges argued that no statute authorizes the creation of such a fund, that it violates the Constitution and federal law—including the Fourteenth Amendment's prohibition on paying debts incurred in aid of insurrection—and that it was designed to compensate, among others, those charged in connection with the January 6 attack. They further argued the fund endangered their lives and safety by incentivizing further political violence. The lawsuit asked a federal judge to declare the fund's creation illegal and reverse any Treasury transfers made to implement it.

== Political activity ==
=== 2024 congressional campaign ===
In October 2023, after U.S. Representative John Sarbanes announced that he would not run for re-election in 2024, Dunn expressed interest in a run for his seat in Maryland's 3rd congressional district. He officially entered the race on January 5, 2024, running in a crowded Democratic primary field that included five state legislators—Mark S. Chang, Sarah Elfreth, Terri Hill, Clarence Lam, and Mike Rogers. If elected, Dunn would have been the second Capitol Police officer elected to Congress after Harry Reid's initial election to Nevada's 1st congressional district in 1982. As a result of his strong fundraising ability and online presence, Dunn was seen as a frontrunner in the race alongside Elfreth and Lam. As of April 2024, Dunn led his opponents in fundraising with $4.5 million in contributions.

During the Democratic primary, Dunn campaigned on abortion, infrastructure, healthcare, and gun reform. He received endorsements from various Democratic celebrities, including U.S. Representatives Nancy Pelosi, Jim Clyburn, Adam Schiff, and Jasmine Crockett, but none from elected officials within the district. Dunn pledged not to accept campaign contributions from corporate political action committees (PACs) and criticized AIPAC for getting involved in the primary by running ads for Elfreth. He also expressed support for Israel and its right to defend itself amid the Gaza war, opposing conditioning U.S. aid to Israel. Dunn also voiced support for a bill to provide $74 billion in funding to Ukraine and Israel and humanitarian aid to the Gaza Strip. Dunn supported an amendment introduced by U.S. Senator Chris Van Hollen that would condition U.S. foreign aid on a country's compliance with international law, but later reiterated that he would only support requiring countries to comply with existing conditions as opposed to establishing new conditions.

Dunn was defeated in the Democratic primary election by state senator Sarah Elfreth on May 14, 2024, placing second with 25.0 percent of the vote. He conceded defeat that night and endorsed Elfreth in the general election.

=== Post-campaign political career ===
Following his defeat, Dunn started his own political action committee, Democracy Defenders PAC, to support candidates running against pro-Trump Republicans. In an interview with Maryland Matters in July 2024, he said that the PAC would not spend heavily on its endorsed candidates because he didn't want it to be seen as the PAC putting its thumb on the scale. Dunn also campaigned for President Biden's 2024 reelection campaign, and later Vice President Kamala Harris's 2024 presidential campaign, in swing states alongside fellow former U.S. Capitol Police officers who were present at the U.S. Capitol during the January 6 Capitol attack.

=== 2026 congressional campaign ===
On February 4, 2026, Dunn announced that he would run for the U.S. House of Representatives in Maryland's 5th congressional district, seeking to succeed U.S. representative Steny Hoyer, who is retiring. During his campaign, he described himself as being "law enforcement 100%" but against U.S. Immigration and Customs Enforcement, calling for the agency's abolition and supporting bills in the Maryland General Assembly to restrict ICE activity and prohibit counties from entering into 287(g) program agreements. Dunn also supported improving Israel–United States relations and increasing humanitarian aid to Palestinian civilians.

In June 2026, Dunn joined fellow candidates Quincy Bareebe and Rushern Baker to criticize state delegate Adrian Boafo after AIPAC's United Democracy Project super PAC and pro-cryptocurrency super PAC Protect Progress spent nearly $8 million in independent expenditures boosting Boafo's campaign. Dunn was defeated by Boafo in the Democratic primary election on June 23, 2026, placing third with 14.0 percent of the vote. Following the primary election, Dunn told Maryland Matters that he did not have a desire to run for office again.

== Personal life ==
Dunn married Danyel Moncree on June 11, 2009, but the couple are now divorced. They have a daughter. Dunn lives in Wheaton, Maryland. During his 2024 and 2026 congressional campaigns, he pledged to move to somewhere within the congressional district he was running for if elected to Congress.

In November 2011, Montgomery County police officers were called to Dunn's home to respond to a violent domestic assault involving Dunn and his then-wife stemming from an argument about his 16-year-old stepson not doing the dishes. According to the internal memo obtained by Punchbowl News, Dunn's wife allegedly waved a kitchen knife in Dunn's direction, prompting him to retrieve his service weapon and rifle, which were stored in a department-issued lockbox with a broken locking mechanism, a violation of U.S. Capitol Police policy that led to a seven-day suspension without pay. When police arrived at the scene, both Dunn and his wife had minor scratches on their arms, and neither was willing to press charges in connection with the incident. In a statement to Punchbowl, Dunn and his wife acknowledged the argument and memo, but denied having been physically violent to each other.

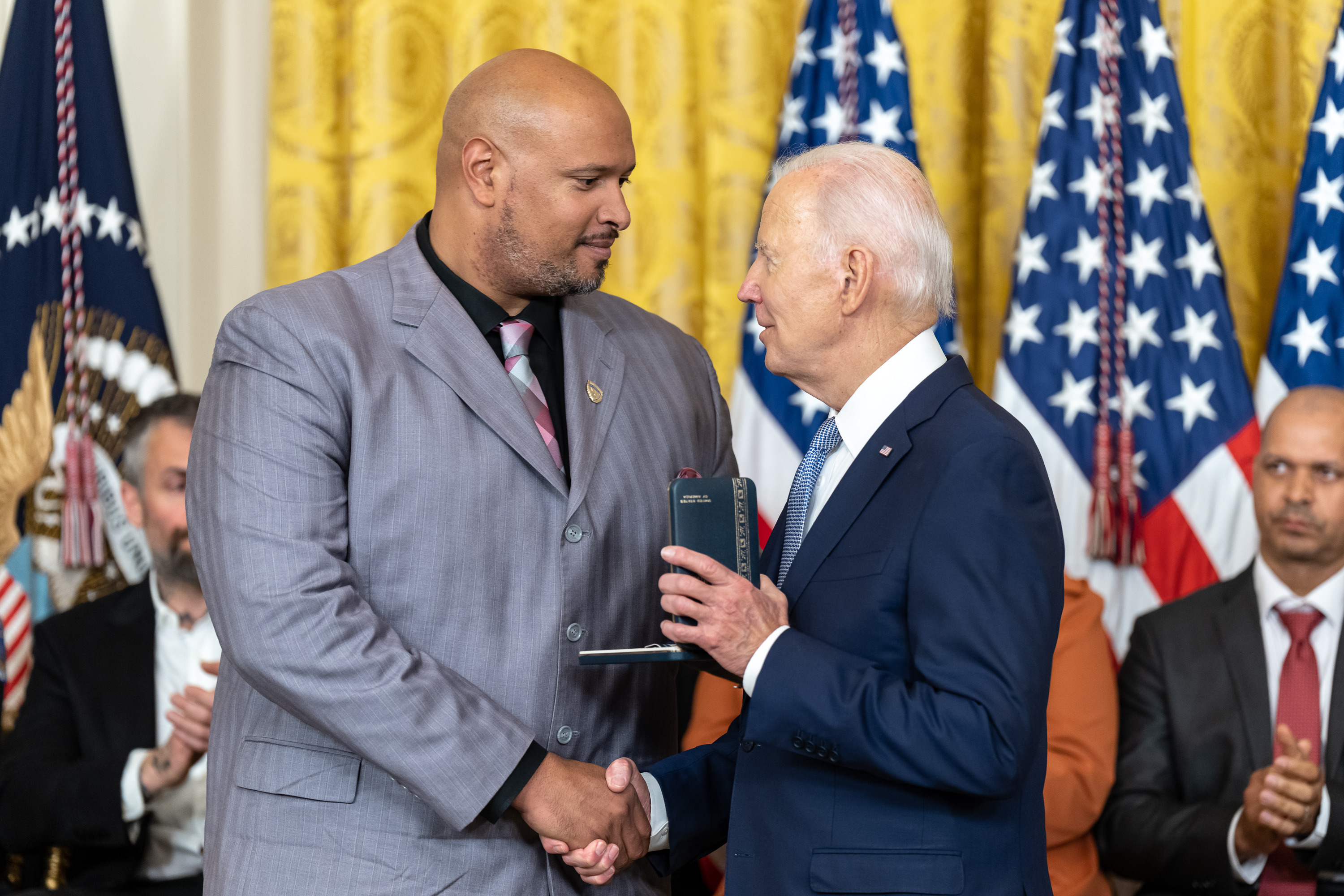
Dunn receiving the Presidential Citizens Medal from Joe Biden in 2023

=== Honors ===
Along with other officers who protected the Capitol during the attack, Dunn was awarded the Congressional Gold Medal on December 6, 2022.

On January 6, 2023, President Biden awarded Dunn with the Presidential Citizens Medal.

The Montgomery County Council presented him with a citation in June 2023.

In August 2024, Dunn became an honorary member of the Iota Phi Theta fraternity during the Iota Leadership Conference in Houston, Texas.

== Bibliography ==
- Dunn, Harry (2023). Standing My Ground: A Capitol Police Officer's Fight for Accountability and Good Trouble After January 6th. Hachette Books. ISBN 9780306831133.
