= Aquilino Gonell =

U.S. Capitol Police officer

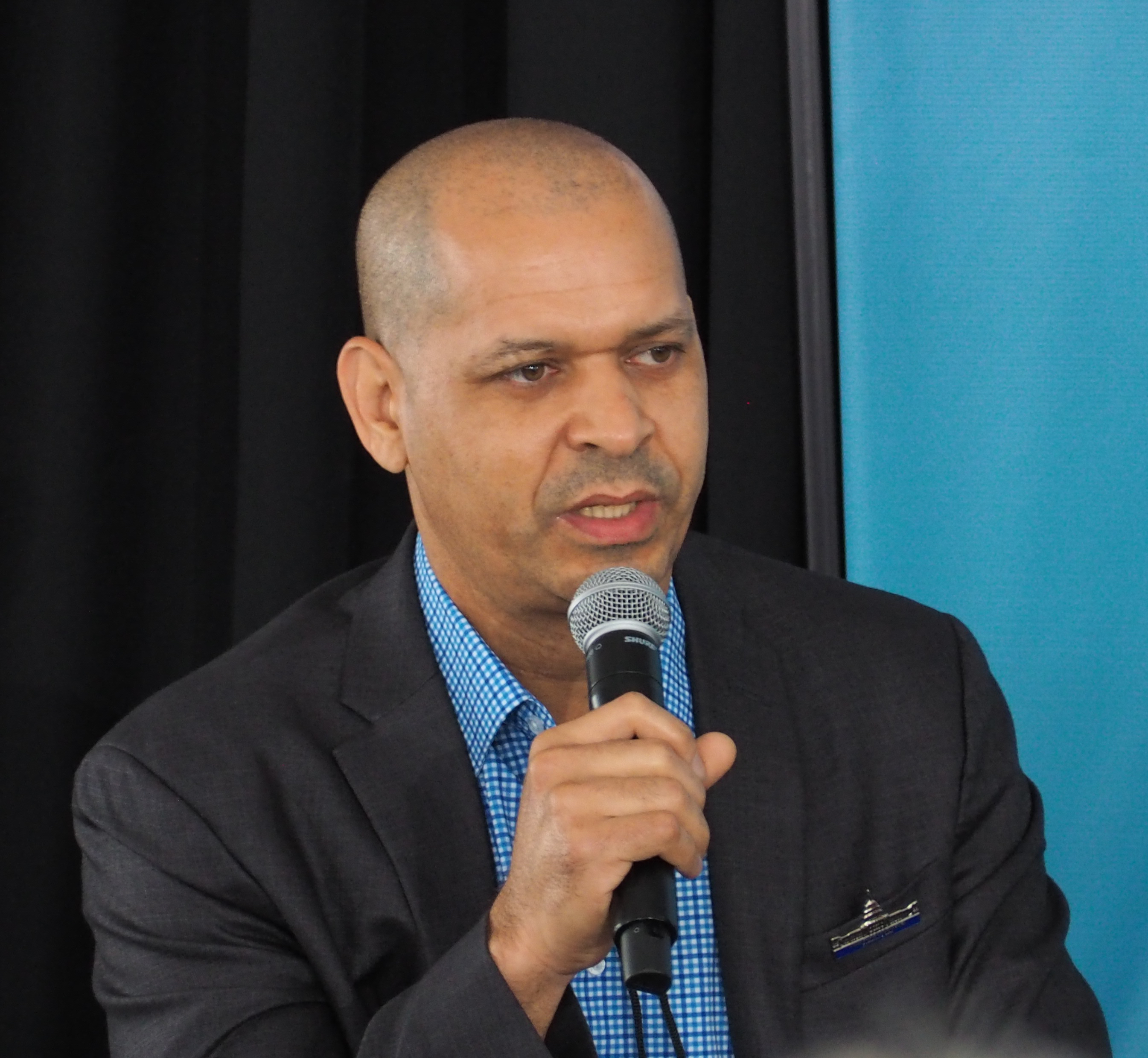
- Gonell in 2024
- Born: 1979 or 1980; Guayubin, Dominican Republic
- Military career
- Allegiance: United States
- Branch: United States Army; United States Capitol Police
- Known for: Defending the U.S. Capitol during the January 6, 2021 attack
- Conflicts: Iraq War
- Awards: Congressional Gold Medal; Presidential Citizens Medal

Aquilino Gonell (born 1979 or 1980) is a Dominican-American former sergeant of the United States Capitol Police who is known for the defending the Capitol building and its occupants during the January 6, 2021, attack. In 2022, he retired from the Capitol Police due to injuries he sustained during the attack. He received the Congressional Gold Medal in 2022 and the Presidential Citizens Medal in 2023. He is the author of American Shield: The Immigrant Sergeant Who Defended Democracy.

== Early life ==
Aquilino Gonell was born in 1979 or 1980 in Guayubin, Dominican Republic. At age 12, in 1992, he moved to Brooklyn in the United States. He became an American citizen. At age 19, in 1999, he joined the U.S. Army in South Carolina. In 2004, he was sent to Iraq, where he saw combat in the Iraq War.

== Career ==
Gonell joined the United States Capitol Police in 2006, and worked there for 16 years. During this time, he became a sergeant, and passed the test for being a lieutenant, but did not become one because of his injuries from January 6.

=== January 6 attacks ===
On January 6, 2021, supporters of then-U.S. President Donald Trump stormed the Capitol to prevent the counting of Electoral College votes in the 2020 presidential election that would confirm Trump's opponent, Joe Biden, to be the next president. The attack began just before 1 p.m., when Trump finished speaking at Washington D.C.'s Ellipse park and his supporters who were listening started marching east towards the Capitol.

The rioters attempted to push past Gonell and other officers who were holding a line. Fighting then broke out. Gonell fought with at least 40 people for six hours. At some point, he was pulled under the crowd of people. He said he lost enough oxygen to where he thought he was going to die. He eventually moved to a tunnel inside the Capitol, trying to prevent the mob from going upstairs. During the fighting, he was punched, bitten, and hit with a flagpole, a bat, and his own baton.

==== Aftermath ====
Gonell underwent two major surgeries because of the injuries during the attack. They included having a metal plate installed on his foot. He also underwent physical and mental therapy to deal with trauma. Six months after the attack, he publicly testified about his experiences in the United States House Select Committee on the January 6 Attack. In summer 2022, Gonell testified in the trial of a man who assaulted him on January 6, Kyle Fitzsimons. Fitzsimons was eventually convicted on 11 charges and 7 felonies. He was sentenced to 87 months in prison.

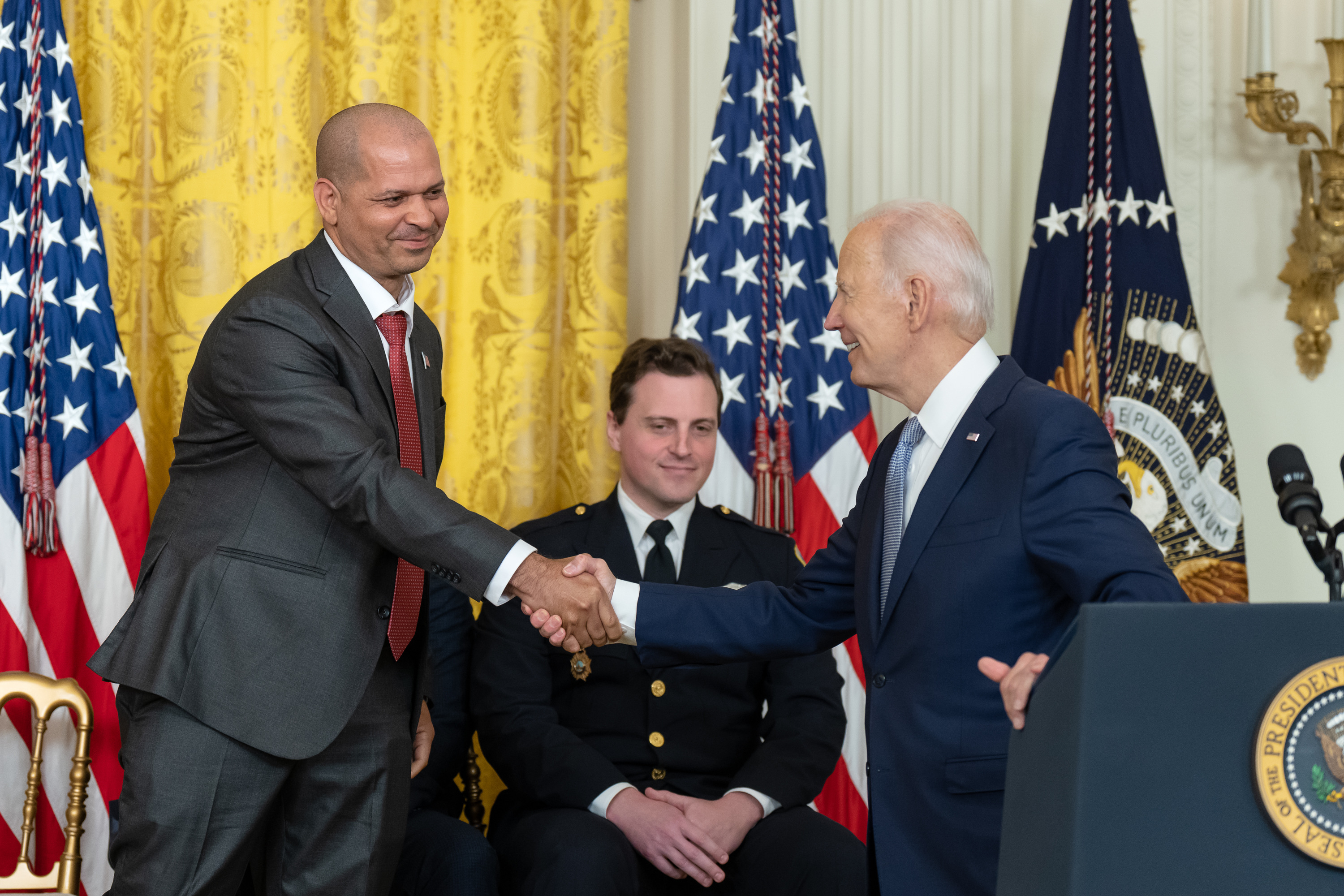
Gonell shaking hands with Joe Biden while being awarded the Presidential Citizens Medal in 2023

On December 6, 2022, Gonell was awarded the Congressional Gold Medal for his role in defending the Capitol. On December 12, 2022, he retired from the Capitol Police, because his injuries made him no longer able to pass the physical tests proving he was fit for the force. On January 6, 2023, Biden awarded 14 people who defended the Capitol, including Gonell, the Presidential Citizens Medal. On November 7, 2023, Gonell's book American Shield: The Immigrant Who Defended Democracy was released.

On January 20, 2025, the first day of the second presidency of Donald Trump, Trump granted blanket clemency to everyone convicted or charged in connection with the Capitol riot, including Gonell's attackers.

=== 2024 election ===
To support Trump's 2024 campaign, Republican Mike Johnson released videotapes of January 6 with footage edited to downplay the attack's violence. This included photographs of Gonell standing upright that evening, attempting to prove that Gonell had not experienced serious violence. On June 6, 2024, when Gonell visited the Pennsylvania State Capitol with fellow Capitol officer Harry Dunn, some Republican legislators in the building booed the officers or walked out.

In mid-2024, Gonell, along with Dunn and D.C. Metropolitan Police officer Daniel Hodges, went to various swing states to campaign for the Joe Biden 2024 presidential campaign. They also appeared in a TV ad targeting Arizonans that highlighted various threats made by Trump. After Biden dropped out of the race, the officers joined the Kamala Harris campaign.

On the third night of the 2024 Democratic National Convention in Chicago, Gonell spoke to the delegates. He spoke of his experience on January 6 and declared that Trump had betrayed the country.

== Bibliography ==
- Gonell, Aquilino; Shapiro, Susan (2023). American Shield: The Immigrant Sergeant Who Defended Democracy.
