= Daniel Hodges (police officer) =

Washington D.C. police officer

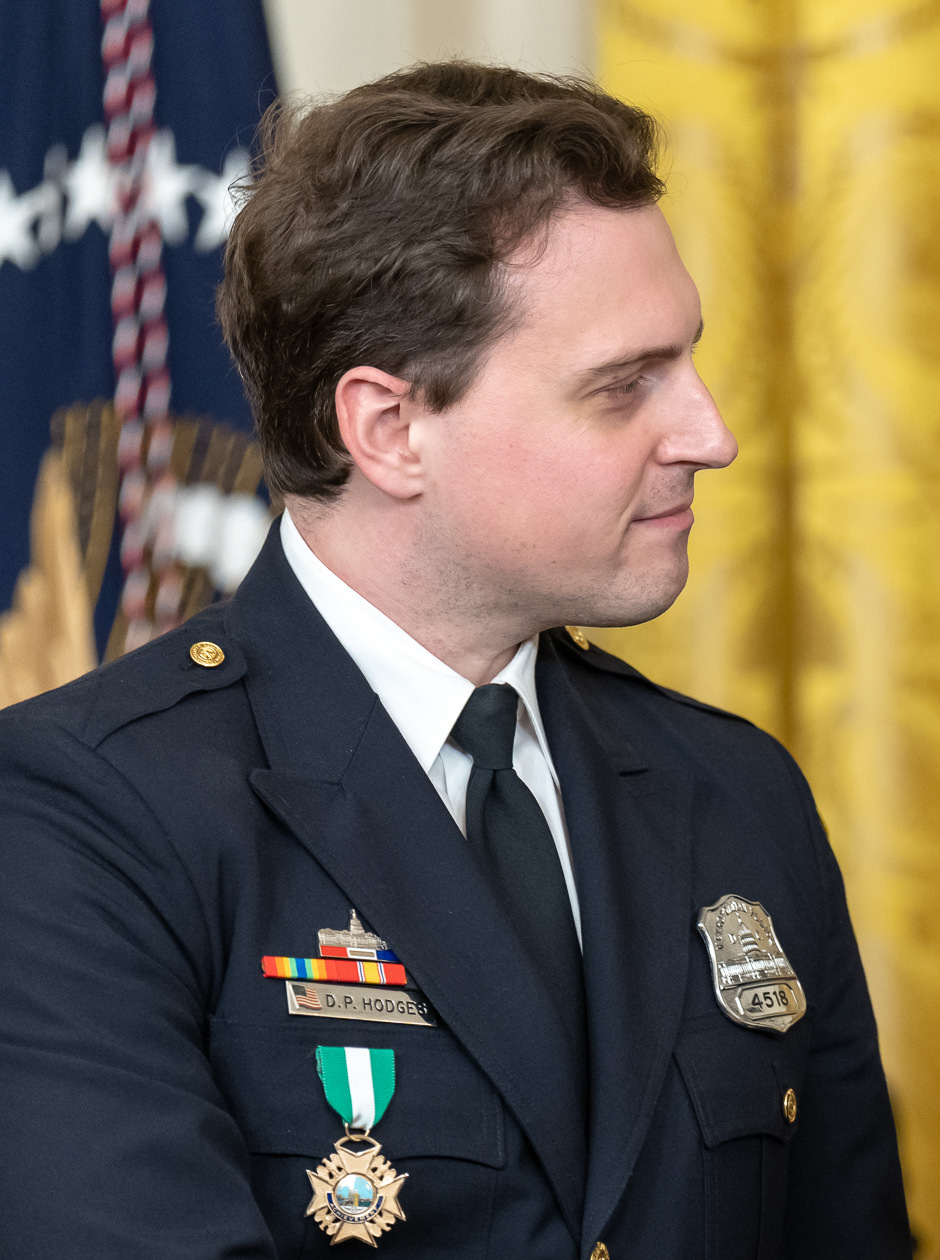
- Hodges in 2023
- Known for: Policeman during the January 6 United States Capitol attack
- Police career
- Country: United States
- Allegiance: District of Columbia
- Department: Metropolitan Police Department of the District of Columbia
- Service years: 2014–present
- Rank: Sworn in as a policeman (2014)
- Badge no.: 4518
- Awards: Presidential Citizens Medal (2023)

Daniel Hodges is an American police officer with the Washington, D.C. Metropolitan Police Department who is known for defending the United States Capitol and its occupants during the violent attack in Washington, D.C. Afterwards, he testified on his experience in multiple trials, including the House Select Committee investigating the Capitol attack. Hodges was awarded the Presidential Citizens Medal in 2023.

== Early career ==
In 2014, Hodges joined the Washington, D.C. Metropolitan Police Department (MPD).

== January 6 Capitol attack ==
On January 6, 2021, a group of supporters of Donald Trump attempted to stop the certification of Electoral College votes that would confirm Trump's opponent, Joe Biden, to be the winner of the 2020 presidential election. The certification took place in the U.S. Capitol building.

Hodge responded to radio backup calls and arrived on the west side of the Capitol building. It was Hodges' first time in the building. His radio was also stolen and he was separated from his platoon. His police baton was stolen by a man named Steven Cappuccio, who then attacked Hodges with it. At one point, a man grabbed Hodges' face and attempted to gouge out one of Hodges' eyes with his thumb.

Eventually, the group fought police, both MPD and U.S. Capitol Police, in the lower west tunnel leading into the building. Hodges tried to stop the group from entering the West Terrace doors. Members took police shields that they had stolen and pinned Hodges against a door frame, crushing him and beating his head against the door. Hodges was screaming, bleeding from the mouth, and it was hard for him to breathe. Steven Cappuccio took off Hodges' gas mask and put his own phone in his (Cappuccio's) mouth so he could attack Hodges with both hands. Hodges then moved out of the fight, being pulled out by another officer. Hodges received a concussion from the attack. Afterwards, he sought medical attention and had an MRI.

=== Aftermath ===
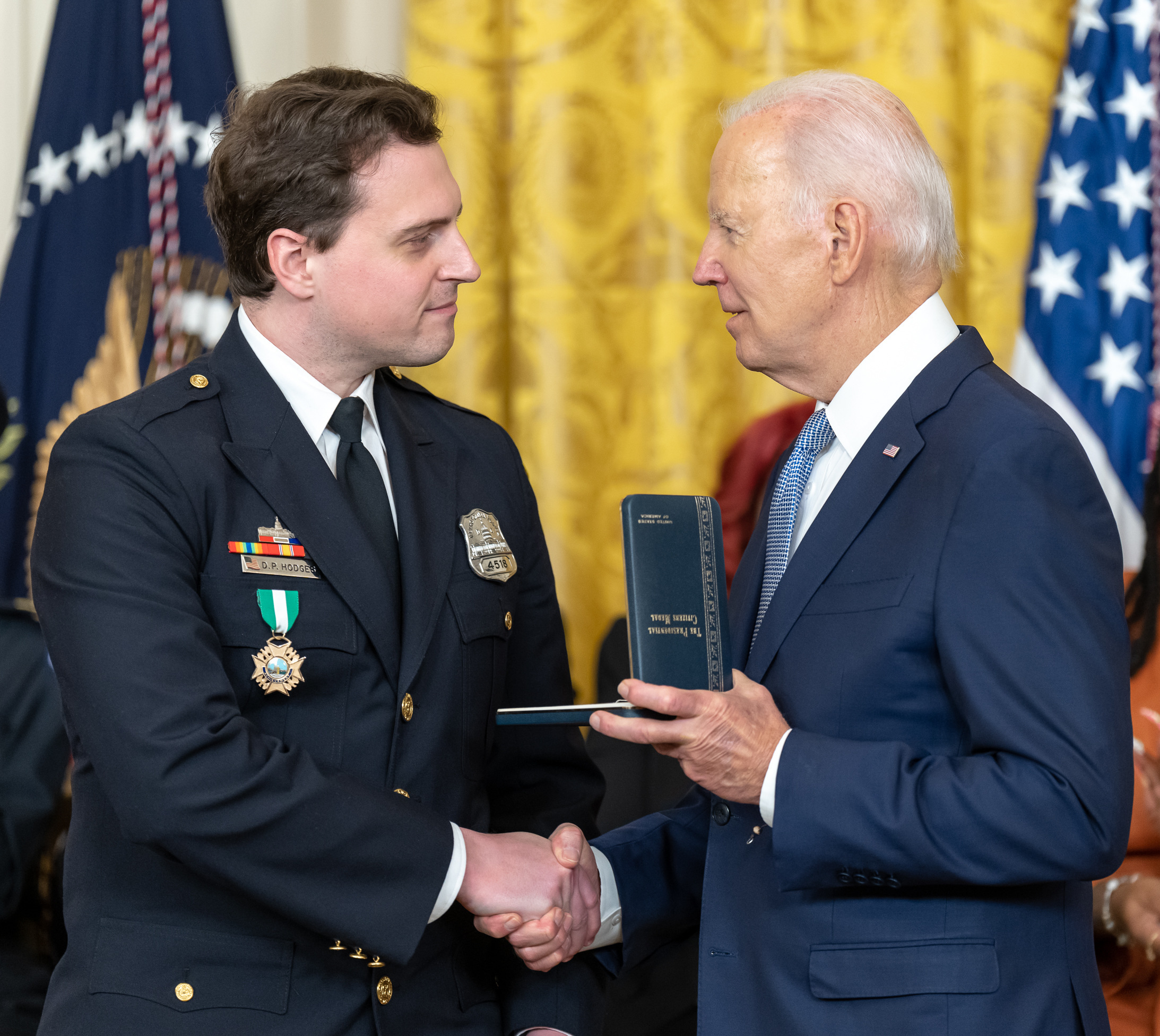
Joe Biden presents the Presidential Citizens Medal to Hodges on January 6, 2023, in the White House.

Forbes wrote: "The video of Hodges’ assault has become one of the most prominent examples of the violence and bloodshed of the Capitol riot ...". It was played during Donald Trump's second impeachment trial in early 2021. Later in January 2021, Hodges said in an interview that "If it wasn’t my job I would’ve done that for free", that "it was absolutely my pleasure to crush a white nationalist insurrection" and that "We’ll do it as many times as it takes."

Later that year, Hodges testified before in public hearings before the House Select Committee to Investigate the January 6th Attack on his experiences during the attack. Footage of Hodges being crushed played frequently during the hearings.

In January 2023, Hodges was awarded the Presidential Citizens Medal by President Joe Biden for his defense of the Capitol. Hodges has also been awarded the collective Congressional Gold Medal in 2022, the Center for Politics' 2023 Defenders of Democracy award, and MPD DC awards such as the Achievement Medal.

In August 2022, Hodges testified and provided body camera footage in a court case in New Mexico on the removal of Otero County Commissioner Couy Griffin for participating in the attack; the removal was successful. Also in August 2022, Hodges testified against Patrick McCaughey in an assault trial; McCaughey was one of those who had stolen a shield and crushed Hodges. In April 2023, McCaughey was sentenced to seven years and six months in prison. Also in 2023, Steven Cappuccio was put on trial for attacking Hodges; his lawyer argued Cappuccio attacked Hodges because of PTSD. The strategy was unsuccessful, and in November 2023, he was sentenced to seven years in prison. In October 2023, Hodges testified during the attack at a court case in Colorado over whether Trump was ineligible to be on the state's ballot for the 2024 presidential election. His was the first testimony during the trial. Trump was eventually ruled ineligible, but the decision was overturned by the Supreme Court.

In 2024, Hodges, along with Harry Dunn and Aquilino Gonell, who also defended the Capitol, campaigned for the Joe Biden 2024 presidential campaign; when Biden dropped out of the race, they campaigned for Kamala Harris' campaign.

On January 20, 2025, the first day of the second presidency of Donald Trump, Trump pardoned nearly every participant in the Capitol attack, including McCaughey and Cappuccio. Hodges responded on his Twitter account: "Thanks America."

=== Legal actions related to January 6 ===
In May 2026, Hodges and Harry Dunn former police officer who served in the United States Capitol Police filed a federal lawsuit in the District of Columbia seeking to dissolve the Trump administration's Anti-Weaponization Fund, a $1.776 billion fund created as part of a settlement of a lawsuit brought by Trump against the IRS over the alleged leaking of his tax returns. Dunn and Hodges argued that no statute authorizes the creation of such a fund, that it violates the Constitution and federal law—including the Fourteenth Amendment's prohibition on paying debts incurred in aid of insurrection—and that it was designed to compensate, among others, those charged in connection with the January 6 attack. They further argued the fund endangered their lives and safety by incentivizing further political violence. The lawsuit asked a federal judge to declare the fund's creation illegal and reverse any Treasury transfers made to implement it.
