= Mary Copeland =

Mary Copeland may refer to:

- Mary Jo Copeland (born 1942), American humanitarian
- Mary Fallin (born 1954), née Copeland, American politician
- M. Shawn Copeland (born 1947), American womanist and theologian
