= Franciscan Brothers of Peace =

Religious order of friars within the Catholic Church

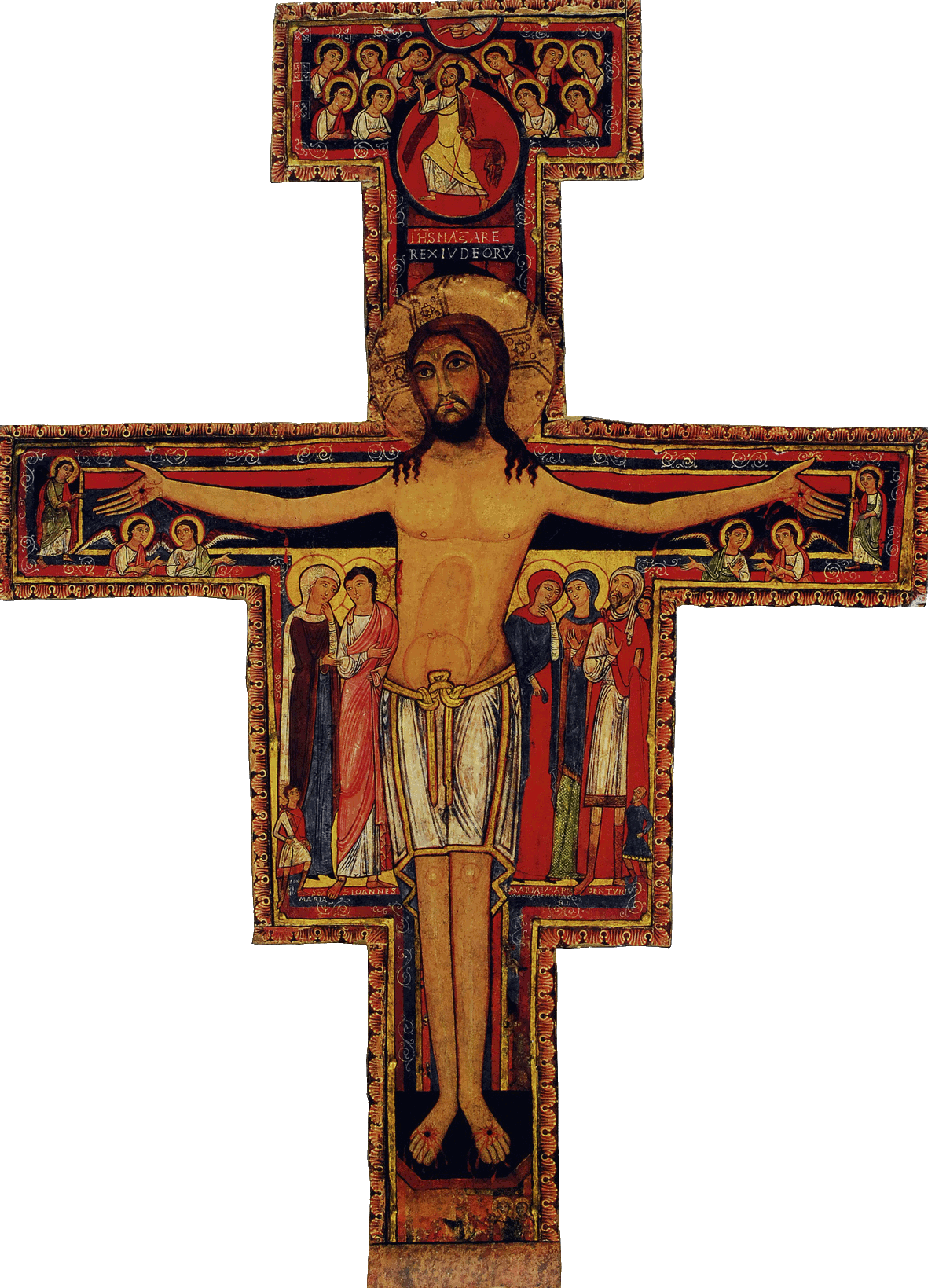
- The San Damiano Cross is used as the logo of the brothers
- Abbreviation: fbp
- Formation: 1982 (informal); 1994 (public association of the faithful)
- Founders: Br. Paul O'Donnell; Br. Michael Gaworski
- Founded at: St. Paul, Minnesota
- Headquarters: Queen of Peace Friary; 1289 Lafond Ave; St. Paul, MN
- Coordinates: 44°57′37″N 93°9′16″W
- Members: 9 (2025)
- Parent organization: Archdiocese of Saint Paul and Minneapolis
- Website: brothersofpeace.org

The Franciscan Brothers of Peace is a religious order in the Franciscan tradition in the Archdiocese of Saint Paul and Minneapolis. The archdiocese recognizes them as the first community of religious brothers to be founded in the territory. The brothers work with refugees, victims of torture, and the pro-life movement; from 1991 to 1999, they operated a hospice for those dying of AIDS. As of 2025, they have nine members.

== History ==
From 1978 to 1982, Paul O'Donnell was a seminarian at Saint John Vianney Seminary and occasionally discussed with friend Michael Gaworski about living a life of more radical devotion to Jesus Christ. Born from this, they founded Pro-Life Action Ministries in 1981. After graduation from college seminary, O'Donnell attended Saint Paul Seminary and Gaworski began working at the Little Sisters of the Poor home in St. Paul. Through a sense of fraternity, Gaworski, O'Donnell, and a third man, David Lehnen, whom Gaworski had met through Alcoholics Anonymous, began living in an apartment and praying regularly together as a religious community simply known as "the Pro-Life Brotherhood". After approaching the Archdiocese of Saint Paul and Minneapolis in 1985, the group was recognized by Archbishop John Roach who canonically established them as a private association of the faithful on July 28, 1986. Roach granted the order ecclesiastical recognition as a Public Association of the Christian Faithful on January 1, 1994. By 1995, the order had 12 members. By 1999, ten friars, six of whom were perpetually professed, were primarily living out of a small house in St. Paul; three lived in a house in North Minneapolis.

Gaworski entered a coma on March 20, 1991, initiated by cardiac arrest caused by bacterial pneumonia; doctors diagnosed him with a persistent vegetative state. He died in 2003. O'Donnell died on February 20, 2015.

In 2005, the order had ten friars. While the order had long envisioned for members to be ordained as priests in its constitutions, the first member to do so was ordained in 2019, though most remain non-clerics. As of 2025, there were nine members.

== Ministry ==
The order does extensive work in the pro-life movement, ministering to women after abortions and also performing sidewalk counseling. They also provide financial support for those facing unplanned pregnancies. Gaworski and Lehnen were arrested in 1985 for a peaceful sit-in at Planned Parenthood in St. Paul.

From 1991 to 1999, the brothers ran Samaritan House, the Twin Cities's first specialized housing program for people with AIDS. In 1999, the program was transferred to Clare Housing, who renamed the home to Damiano House; during the nine years the brothers operated the hospice, they assisted over 50 men.

Gaworski's situation caused the brothers to have an extremely sympathetic view towards the Terri Schiavo case in 2005, which they began to volunteer extensively for. As part of the efforts, O'Donnell spoke at the March for Life, met with Vatican officials, and stayed at the side of Schiavo's parents in Florida. They also advocated for Joseph Maraachli case.

As of 2018, they had housed around 70 victims of torture, providing room, board, clothing, phone cards, and other needs, in cooperation with the Center for Victims of Torture. They also have worked with the Dorothy Day homeless shelter in St. Paul, and Sharing and Caring Hands in Minneapolis.

The brothers were regular visitors at the bedside of Tim Vakoc, a Catholic military chaplain who was injured by an IED in 2005. The brothers began ministering to Karenni refugees in 2010, with one brother learning the Karen language. Their food shelf served 3,500 individuals in 2021.

== Friaries ==
The brothers established Queen of Peace Friary on Lafond Avenue in St. Paul, in a 22-bedroom former convent next to St. Columba parish. The friary is in the low-income neighborhood of Frogtown. They also have a friary next to St. Patrick in St. Paul, and a spiritual retreat center in northern Minnesota about ten miles from Lake Superior.
