= Vijaya Emani =

Indian American social activist

Vijaya Lakshmi Emani
- Born: 14 May 1957; Kurnool, Andhra Pradesh, India
- Died: 15 January 2009 (age 51); Ohio, U.S.
- Occupation: Social activist

Vijaya Lakshmi Emani (14 May 1957 – 15 January 2009) was an Indian American social activist known for her work against domestic violence, and was a civic leader among the Indian American community in Cleveland, Ohio. Starting with Northeast Ohio Telugu Association, followed by the Federation of Indian Community Associations and with Greater Cleveland Asian Community, she was the president of the Federation of India Community and a board member of the Federation of India Community Associations (FICA). She was posthumously awarded the Presidential Citizens Medal, the second-highest United States civilian award, in 2011.

== Early life and education ==
Emani was born at Kurnool in Andhra Pradesh, to Telugu parents Indurani and G. Venkataramana Reddy. She moved to the United States in 1986 after graduating from Osmania University in Hyderabad. She received a master's degree in computer science from Cleveland State University in Ohio.

== Career ==
As a single parent, she initiated support groups for those in similar situations. Emani's main goal was to help Indian-Americans overcome social mistreatment in the United States. She also opened a discussion about the prevalence of domestic violence within immigrant communities in the United States. Emani was instrumental in revitalizing the Cleveland Cultural Gardens through her work in the construction of the India Cultural Garden from 2002–2006. The construction of the India Cultural Garden at Rockefeller Park in Cleveland, Ohio features a circular garden space with six heritage pillars and a statue of Mahatma Gandhi installed in 2006, sculpted by Gautam Pal.

== Death ==
Emani died in a road accident in Ohio in 2009, at the age of 51. On 20 October 2011, President Barack Obama posthumously awarded her with the Presidential Citizens Medal for her courage in overcoming and speaking out against domestic abuse in the Indian-American community. Emani was described as "a role model for victims of domestic abuse." The award was received by Emani's two daughters, Sujata and Nirmala, in the East Room of the White House.

== Works ==
- Computational Analysis of Multiphase Flow in a Helical Water-oil Separator Using CFD. Texas A&M University - Kingsville, 2006. ISBN 0542829428.
