= Maria S. Gomez =

American nurse

Maria S. Gómez
- Education: University of California, Berkeley; Georgetown University
- Employer(s): District of Columbia Department of Health; Mary's Center
- Awards: Presidential Citizens Medal

Maria S. Gómez is an American nurse who is president and chief executive officer at Mary's Center. Mary's Center provides prenatal and postnatal care for Latino women in Washington, D.C. She was awarded the Presidential Citizens Medal in 2012.

== Early life and education ==
Gómez immigrated from Colombia to the United States at the age of 13. She was part of the District of Columbia Public Schools system. Gómez earned her bachelor's degree in nursing at Georgetown University. She moved to the University of California, Berkeley for graduate studies, where she earned a Master of Public Health.

== Career ==
Gómez worked as a nurse in MedStar Georgetown University Hospital at the District of Columbia Department of Health. She realized that Latin American immigrants were not seeking healthcare, and that women had often experienced trauma on their journeys north. Gomez established Mary's Center in 1988. The center was founded in an Adams Morgan basement. The clinic provided bilingual pre- and postnatal care to women of Latino descent who live in Washington, D.C. The center was initially funded by the Office of Latino Affairs of the District of Columbia.

In 2018, Gomez returned to Georgetown University as a distinguished Professor. During the COVID-19 pandemic, Mary's Center was involved with the vaccine rollout. As the city emerged from a year of lockdowns, Gómez was part of the Reopen DC committee. In 2021, Gómez partnered with Feed the Fridge to make healthy fresh food available at Mary's Center. The refrigerators provide free meals to anyone experiencing food insecurity, with no need for proof of income.

== Awards and honors ==
- 2012 Presidential Citizens Medal
- 2013 Caring Institute Adult Award Winner
- 2013 Pan American Health Organization Special Recognition
- 2015 Washington Business Journal Women Who Mean Business Award
- 2016 DC Dental Society Humanitarian of the Year Award
- 2018 University of California, Berkeley Most Influential Alumni
- 2019 Robert Wood Johnson Foundation Health Equity Award
- 2019 DC Hispanic Bar Association Equal Justice Award
- 2019 GWHCC Hispanic Business Hall of Fame
- 2019 YWCA National Capital Area Empowering Every Woman Award
