= Raymond Castellani =

American actor (1933–2021)

Raymond Jay Castellani (February 13, 1933 – October 18, 2021) was an American character actor. As a former alcoholic, he founded the Frontline Foundation, which serves meals to the homeless on the Los Angeles' Skid Row.

Castellani was born in Albany, New York on February 13, 1933. In 1995, Castellani received the Presidential Citizens Medal from President Bill Clinton at a White House ceremony. During the early 1990s, President George H. W. Bush included Castellani among his "thousand points of light." He attended The Albany Academy, class of 1952. Upon graduation, he spent a semester at Springfield College. During this time he received a draft notice, and then served as a Marine during the Korean War.

During the 1950s and 1960s, Castellani acted in numerous plays, television shows, and films, including Bonanza, Lawman, and Dragnet.

In New York, he appeared in plays such as The Curious Savage, A Hatful of Rain, The Rainmaker, What Makes Sammy Run?, and Light Up the Sky.

In 2008, Castellani released an autobiography titled, The End Was But A Beginning: A True Story.

He served over one million meals on the streets of Skid Row in downtown Los Angeles. He died on October 18, 2021, at the age of 88.
