= Sharing and Caring Hands =

Day center for the homeless in Minneapolis

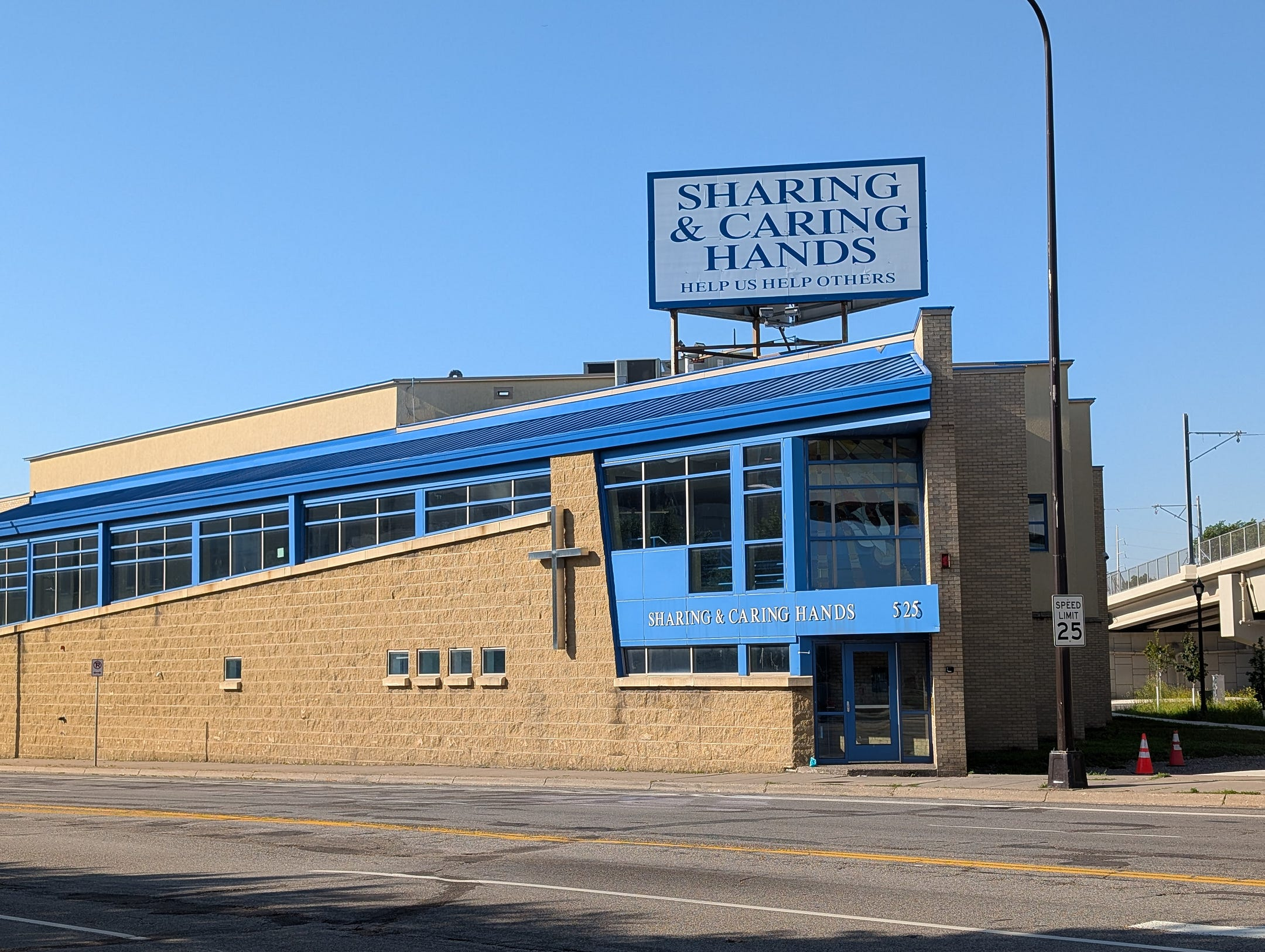
- Sharing and Caring Hands in 2025
- Established: 1985; 41 years ago
- Founder: Mary Jo Copeland
- Type: Nonprofit
- Tax ID no.: 36-3412619
- Purpose: Provide food and shelter for the homeless
- Headquarters: 525 N. 7th St. Minneapolis, MN
- Location: United States
- Coordinates: 44.9832°N 93.2825°W
- Funding: Private donations
- Staff: 26 (2023)
- Volunteers: 3,000 (2023)
- Website: sharingandcaringhands.org

Sharing and Caring Hands is a Minneapolis non-profit drop-in center dedicated to providing food, shelter, and clothing to the unhoused population of the Twin Cities in Minnesota, United States. As of 2020, Sharing and Caring Hands was feeding about 700 to 800 persons daily. Mary's Place, a transitional housing complex, was opened in 1995.

== History ==
Mary Jo Copeland, a Catholic mother of 12, began to volunteer at Catholic Charities after her youngest child began school. However, feeling overwhelmed by paperwork and bureaucracy, she took matters into her own hands and brought food and clothing to those in need from the trunk of her car. In 1985, she received a $2500 ($7,484 in 2025) grant from a local TV station. Operations eventually began at 16 Glenwood Ave in Minneapolis.

By 1987, some 500 people were fed daily, with 600 and 700 on the weekends, totaling more than 10,000 lunches each month. Some 300 volunteers helped run the organization. By 2020, 700 to 800 people per day were being fed at Sharing and Caring Hands. Sharing and Caring Hands does not take government subsidies.

In 1987, the City of Minneapolis sought to raze the building to make room for the Target Center, for the new NBA team of the Minnesota Timberwolves; Copeland needed to raise $240,000 ($653,348 in 2025) by February 1988 to move to a new building two blocks away. The press coverage from the incident would allow her to fundraise to fund the new location at 525 N. 7th St.

Mary's Place, a three-story, 50,000 square feet (4,600 m^{2}) transitional housing complex with 200 beds, opened in 1995 next to Sharing and Caring Hands for a cost of $6.5 million. Mary's Place was envisioned to provide short-term housing for mothers and children. Its construction faced objections from city council members who argued the area was improperly zoned. In 2014, two-thirds of the units at Mary's Place were being used to house Somali refugees. In 2016, a $5 million ($6.79 million in 2025), 10,000 square-foot expansion project added space for a youth center and more temporary housing. Eight apartments were added to the 92 already-present residential units. By 2020, its 100 units could house 600 to 700 parents and children.

In 2002, Sharing and Caring Hands purchased a 26-acre site off of Lone Oak Road and Minnesota State Highway 55 in the city of Eagan, Minnesota, with the intention of building a $30 million, 200-bed children's home to be called the Gift of Mary's Children's Home. Several other suburbs of the Twin Cities, including the city of Brooklyn Center, were considered, but city officials rejected the plans; the city council and mayor of Eagan, however, were supportive. Plans approved by the city council in a 4-1 decision in December 2002. Plans for the facility were called off after sufficient donations were unable to be raised, Mary Jo Copeland blamed the inability to fundraise on the controversy around the topic. The site was sold to a developer in 2015.

Sharing and Caring Hands again was embroiled in controversy surrounding a sports stadium in 2008, when the newly built Target Field's proximity to the center raised concerns about the site's security and drug offenses happening on the site. The City of Minneapolis considered not renewing the license of Sharing and Caring Hands; seventeen arrests had been made at Sharing and Caring Hands in 2006 for drug offenses.

Copeland received the Presidential Citizens Medal from Barack Obama in 2013 for her work with Sharing and Caring Hands.
