= Academy of Holy Angels =

Catholic high school in Minnesota, US

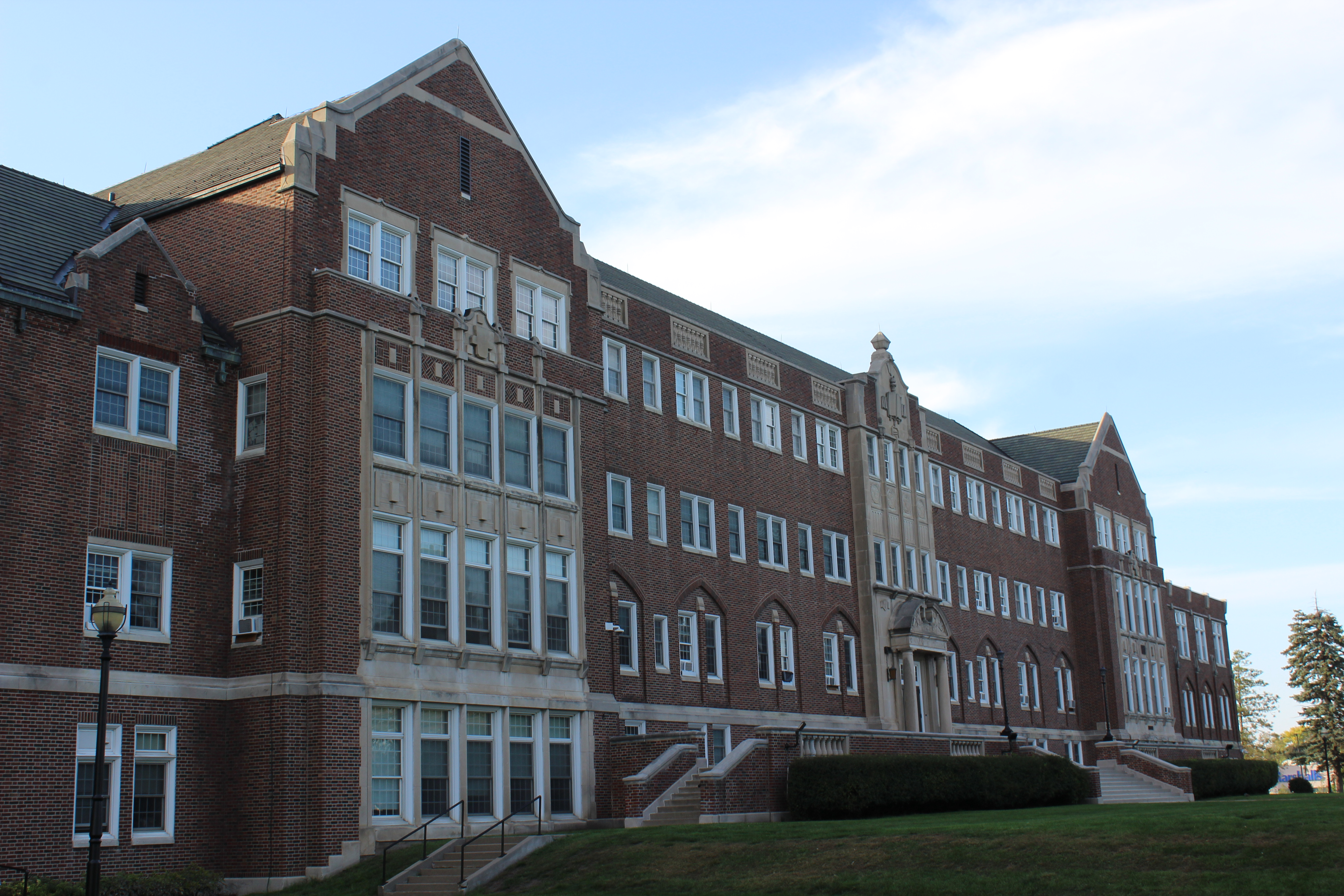

Location
- 6600 Nicollet Avenue South; Richfield, Minnesota 55423; United States; 44°52′57″N 93°16′47″W

Information
- Type: Private, Coeducational High School
- Motto: Believe. Achieve
- Religious affiliation: Catholic Church
- Patron saint: St. Joseph
- Established: October 2, 1877; 149 years ago
- Founder: Sisters of St. Joseph of Carondelet
- President: Dr. David Sorkin
- Principal: Heidi Foley
- Chaplain: Father Michael Tix
- Faculty: 68
- Grades: 9–12
- Enrollment: 650 (2017)
- Average class size: 21
- Student to teacher ratio: 13:1
- Hours in school day: 7:50 AM to 2:40 PM
- Campus type: Suburban
- Colors: Royal blue and Vegas gold
- Athletics conference: Tri-Metro Conference
- Mascot: Shiner
- Team name: Stars
- Accreditation: AdvancED
- Newspaper: The AHA Star
- Tuition: $16,595 + $400 IT fee
- Website: academyofholyangels.org

Academy of Holy Angels (AHA) is a private Catholic high school in Richfield, Minnesota. Located in the Archdiocese of Saint Paul and Minneapolis, the college-preparatory school educates more than 600 students each year, with students in grades nine through twelve coming from across the Twin Cities metropolitan area.

== History ==
The Academy of Holy Angels was founded by the Sisters of St. Joseph of Carondelet on October 2, 1877, the feast of the Holy Guardian Angels. Originally a day school for girls, it was housed in the Merritt House in Minneapolis, but moved several times in its early years (first to the Ankeny home, then the Skyles house, and finally the Bassett property in 1882). The same year, it became a boarding school and day school for girls in grade school and high school. Sister St. John Ireland, CSJ, was the first directress.

It moved to its present-day location at Nicollet and 66th Street on Sept. 15, 1931, amidst a record-breaking heat wave of 104 degrees. It opened its doors to 107 students grades 1–12, having merged with the nearby St. Margaret's Academy high school some years before, with Sister Eugenia Maginnis, CSJ, as principal. Still an all-girls school, it attracted students from across the Midwest, and 182 girls enrolled by the end of the first year. The original grounds included a formal English garden in the courtyard, tennis courts, a 9-hole golf course, and an ice skating rink during the winter. High school tuition (grades 9–12) was $50.

On May 2, 1932, Academy of Holy Angels was formally accredited, and has maintained an accreditation ever since. The first graduating class contained just 13 girls. By 1943, Holy Angels had discontinued its grade school but continued to offer Kindergarten until 1946, when St. Peter's Church next door opened its parish elementary school. The 1952–53 school year was the last year for boarders to live at Holy Angels, and 1953 marked the beginning of Holy Angels solely as a day school.

In 1972, the school officially became coeducational, opening its doors to 128 new male students; the first four-year, co-ed class graduated in 1976. Because the school was now co-ed, the Angies became the co*Stars and varsity athletics began. The Sisters of St. Joseph of Carondelet "turned governance of the school over to a lay board of directors", but continue to own the school for the time being, renting it to AHA at a cost of $1 per year. In 1989, the Holy Angels theater school officially opened; a middle school was also established, but closed just 9 years later.

The first of two StarDomes was built in 1996, adding "a $2 million, year-round athletic facility" to campus (making Holy Angels the first high school in the United States to have a facility of this type). The complex includes bleachers, a concession building and a playing field, which consists of field turf, and features a removable dome to make the field playable during the winter months. Two years later, campus classroom space was expanded by 15% in a substantial renovation project. The 26-acre campus was officially purchased from the Sisters of St. Joseph of Carondelet in 2003; the same year, a 70,000-square-foot addition opened. Both projects were supported by a $5 million fundraising campaign.

In 2000, Holy Angels became the first private school to receive an Ethics in Curriculum Award from the Minnesota Academic Excellence Foundation. The same year, the St. John the Evangelist Chapel was refurbished and rededicated, and the new greenhouse opened. Athletic programs continued to grow, and in 2005, Holy Angels became the first high school ever in Minnesota to win both girls' (Class A) and boys' (Class AA) hockey state championships the same year.

By 2007, AHA had begun Project Laptop, equipping the 9th grade class with a personal computer for academic use. A version of the program continues today, although technology has been updated and improved substantially over the years. 2011 saw the retirement of former AHA President Jill Reilly, to be succeeded by current President Tom Shipley. The same year, the STEM diploma program opened. In 2019, a second StarDome was completed.

== Service day ==
Service: In addition to yearly service requirements (75 hours to be completed before graduation), students participate in an annual All School Service Day, a yearly family Christmas Basket Drive (a tradition continued since the 1940s), and Campus Ministry Team, among other opportunities. AHA's Faith in Action program also aims to "incorporate service and spirituality into all aspects of AHA life", including sports, activities, and clubs; over 25 teams participate, contributing 2,000+ service hours.

== Academics ==
The Academy of Holy Angels is currently accredited through AdvancedED. 19 AP courses are offered to sophomores, juniors, and seniors; in 2015, 230 students participated in the AP program (81% of senior class, 72% of junior class).

In addition to regular coursework, students can pursue a Theater Diploma and/or a STEM Diploma, and earn language certificates through the Minnesota Department of Education.

== Extracurriculars ==
Holy Angels currently offers 52 extra-curricular activities. These include Book Club, bowling, Knowledge Bowl, Math Stars, HOSA (Health Occupations Students of America) Choirs, Jazz Band, National Honor Society, Respect Life, robotics, skeet & trap, Social Justice Club, speech, table tennis, theater (Starlight Productions), and Writers' Club, among others.

== Athletics ==
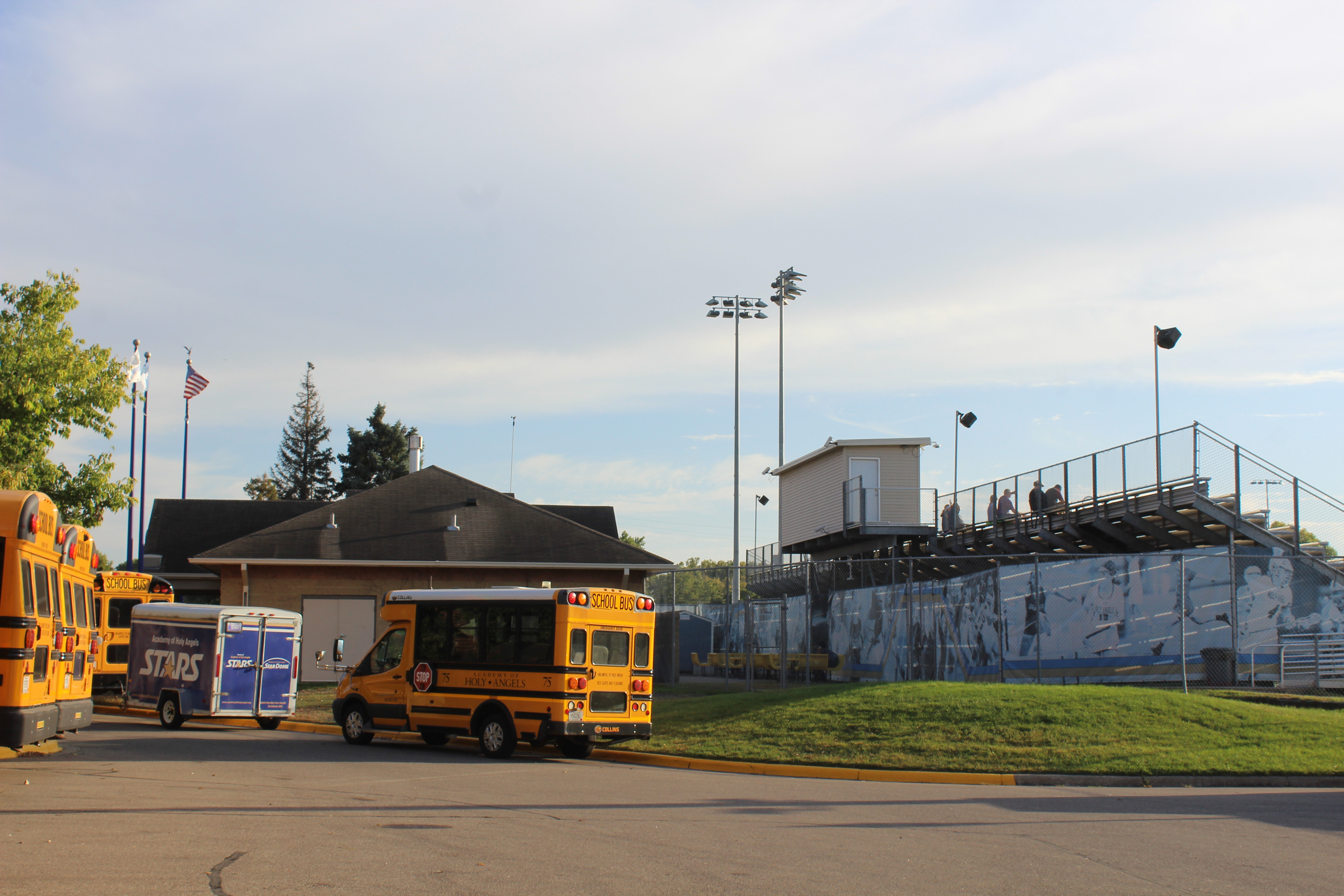
StarDome Athletic Field

Holy Angels participates in the Tri-Metro Conference, which is part of the Minnesota State High School League. Since 2017, AHA has made over 37 state appearances. The AHA mascot, Shiner the Angel, though retired for some years, was reintroduced recently.

Fall sports: cross country, dance club, football, soccer, swimming, tennis, and volleyball.

Winter sports: alpine skiing, basketball, dance team, hockey, Nordic ski, and swimming.

Summer sports: baseball, golf, lacrosse, softball, tennis, and track & field.

State Championships
Season	Sport	Number of Championships	Year
Fall	Soccer, Girls	2	2003, 2022
	Football, Boys	1	2017
	Soccer, Boys	2	2019, 2024
Winter	Hockey, Girls	1	2005
Winter	Table tennis	2	2011, 2013
Winter	Hockey, Boys	2	2002, 2005
Winter	Cheerleading	6	2003, 2004, 2005, 2009, 2010, 2011
Winter	Basketball, Girls	3	1969, 1975, 2016
Spring	Golf, Boys	3	1994, 1998, 1999
Spring	Softball, Girls	1	2000
Total		23	

== Theater ==
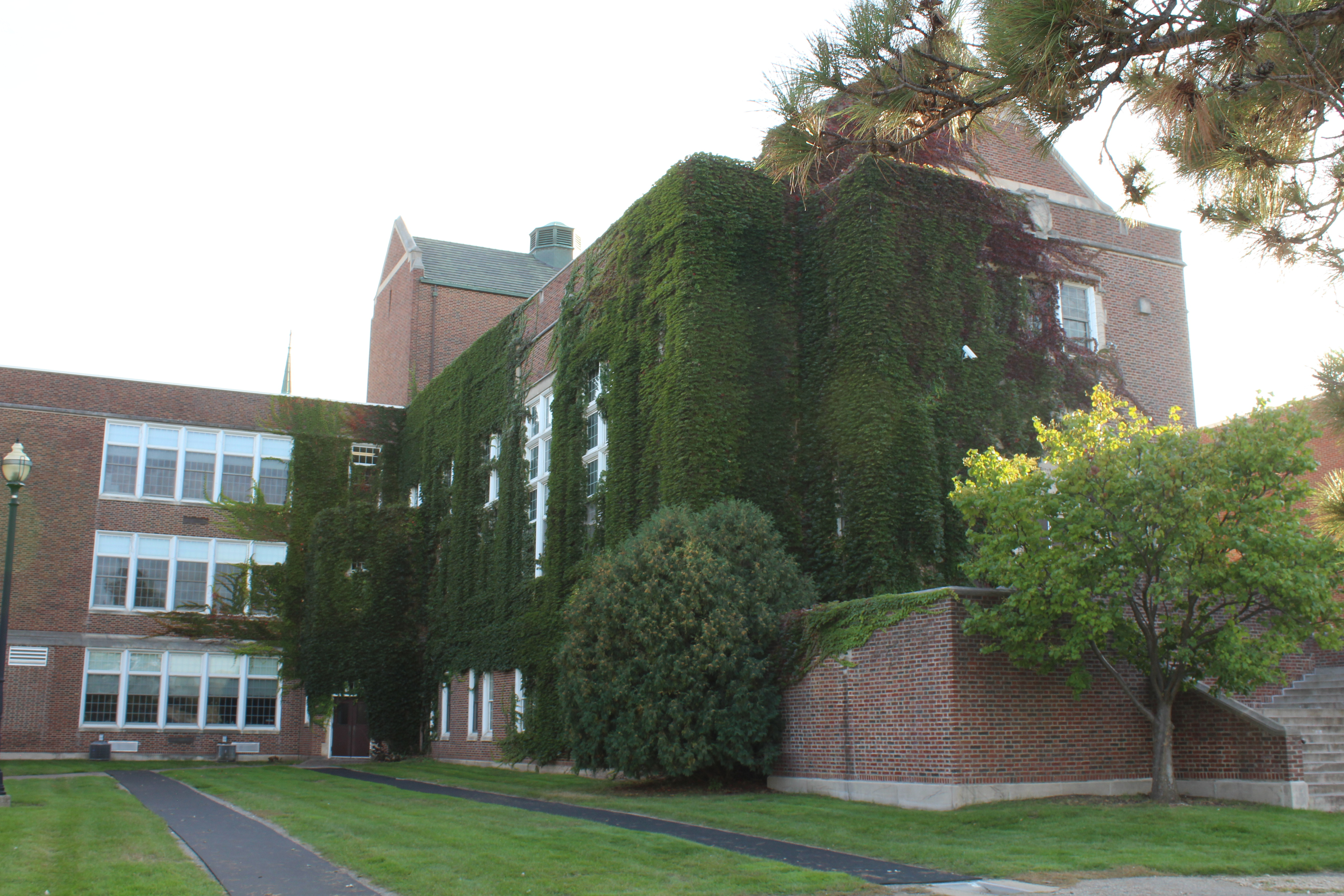
Theater building

Since 1931, Holy Angels has been a sponsor of theatrical arts. Besides offering 15 courses in the acting and design/technical disciplines, students can choose to enroll in the AHA Theater School, working toward a theater diploma in addition to their regular programs of study.

Today, the Holy Angels theater department, Starlight Productions, produces three shows each year: a fall play, a spring musical, and an entry into the MSHSL State One Act competition. Since first participating in 1989, Holy Angels has received a star rating ten times: in 1989, 1993, 1997, 1998, 2002, 2003, 2004, 2005, 2015, and 2016. AHA currently participates in the Section 6AA One Act class.

Graduates have gone on to perform and study at the Guthrie Theater, Theatre de la Jeune, the American Academy of Dramatic Arts, Carnegie Mellon University, Webster Conservatory, Tisch School for the Arts, and Broadway.

== Notable alumni ==
- Thomas Breitling, entrepreneur
- John Berg, Third Superior General of the Priestly Fraternity of Saint Peter
- Troy Bell, a professional basketball player
- Kelly Carlson, actress
- Mike Carman, professional hockey player
- Mary Jo Copeland
- Joseph Cure, hockey player, actor
- Jack Hillen, Professional Ice Hockey Player - Defenseman, New York Islanders, Nashville Predators, Washington Capitals (2008–present)
- Emmett Johnson, 2021 Mr. Football and running back for the Nebraska Cornhuskers.
- Gavin Kaysen, internationally known chef
- Susan King, professional basketball player in the WNBA
- T. R. Knight, actor, Grey's Anatomy
- Paul Peterson, musician
- Paul Thissen, Minnesota Supreme Court Justice, 2018–Present, Minnesota House of Representatives 2003-2018 (Speaker of the Minnesota House, 2013–2014)
- John Stocco, professional football player
- Katherine Witchie, actress and dancer

=== Attended, but not alumni ===
- Larry Fitzgerald (transferred to Valley Forge Military Academy), a former professional football player in the NFL.
- Erik Johnson (transferred to US National Team Development Program), hockey defenseman, Colorado Avalanche, 2006 NHL 1st overall draft pick by the St. Louis Blues. 2010 USA Olympian and silver medalist
- Mike Reilly, (transferred to Shattuck-St. Mary's), hockey player, University of Minnesota (2012–2015), Minnesota Wild (2015–2017), Montreal Canadiens (2017–2020), Ottawa Senators (2020–2021), and Boston Bruins (2021–)
- Paul Westerberg, musician. Left school spring of senior year

== See also ==
- List of high schools in Minnesota

== Gallery ==
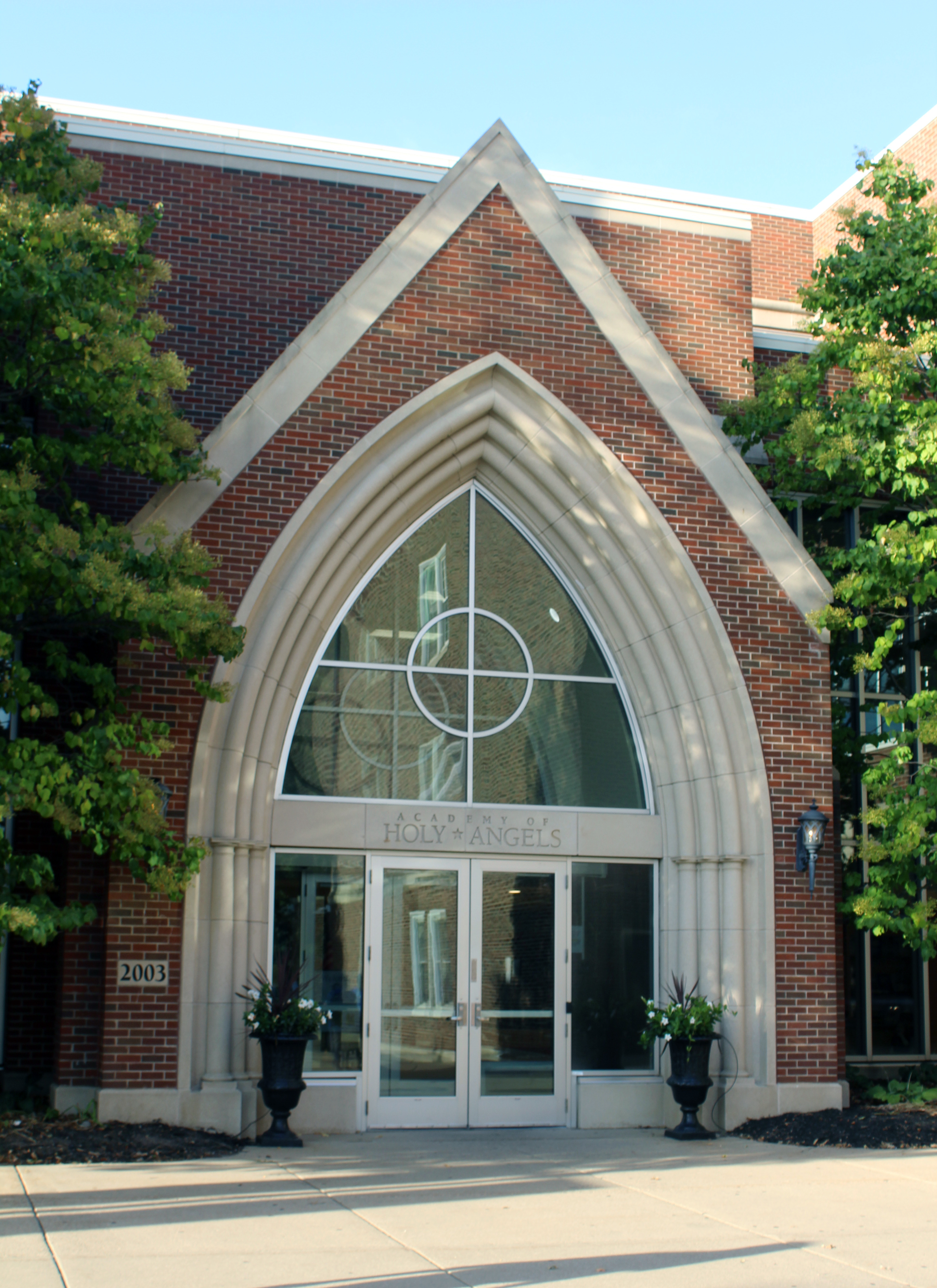
Main entrance

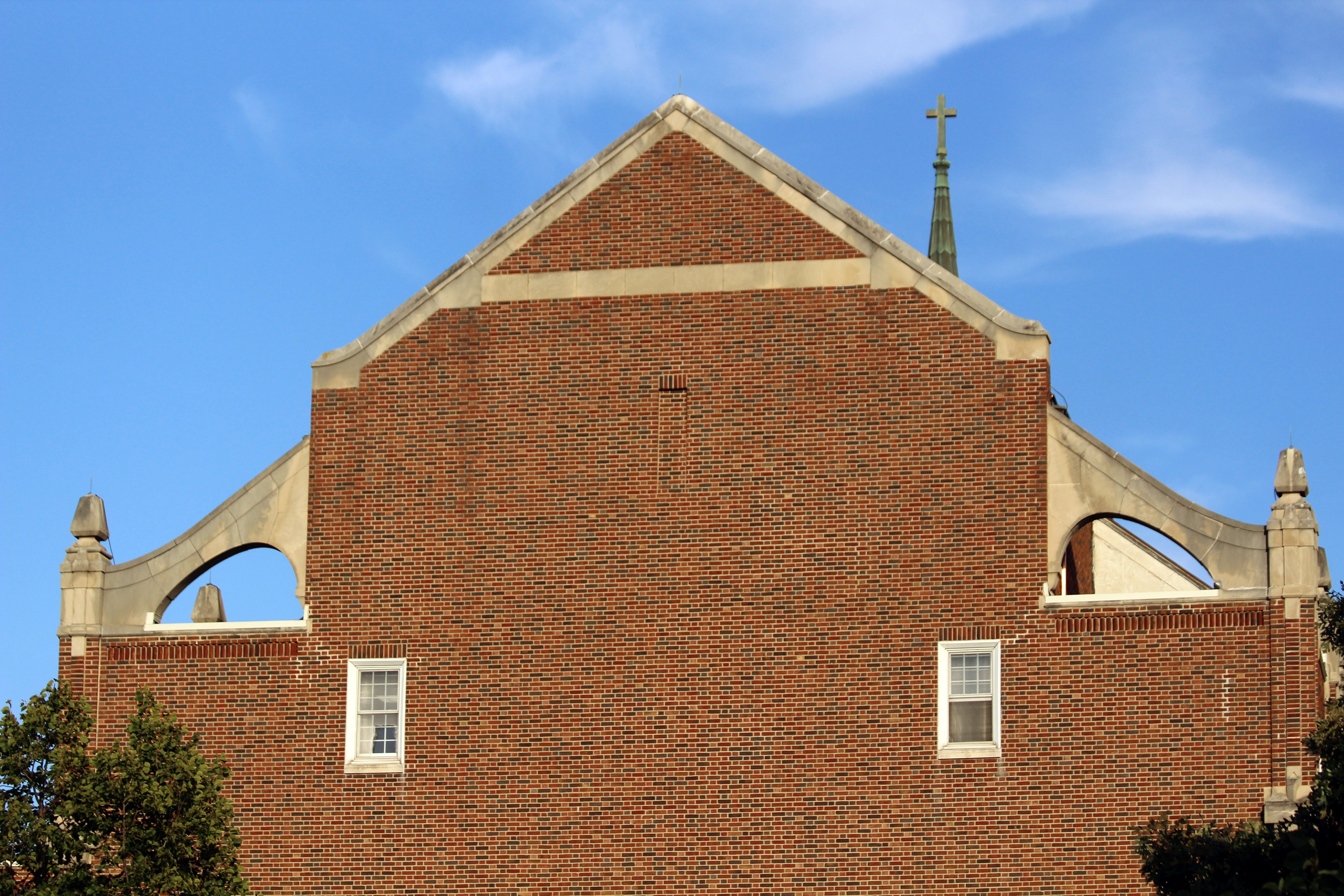
Music Auditorium exterior

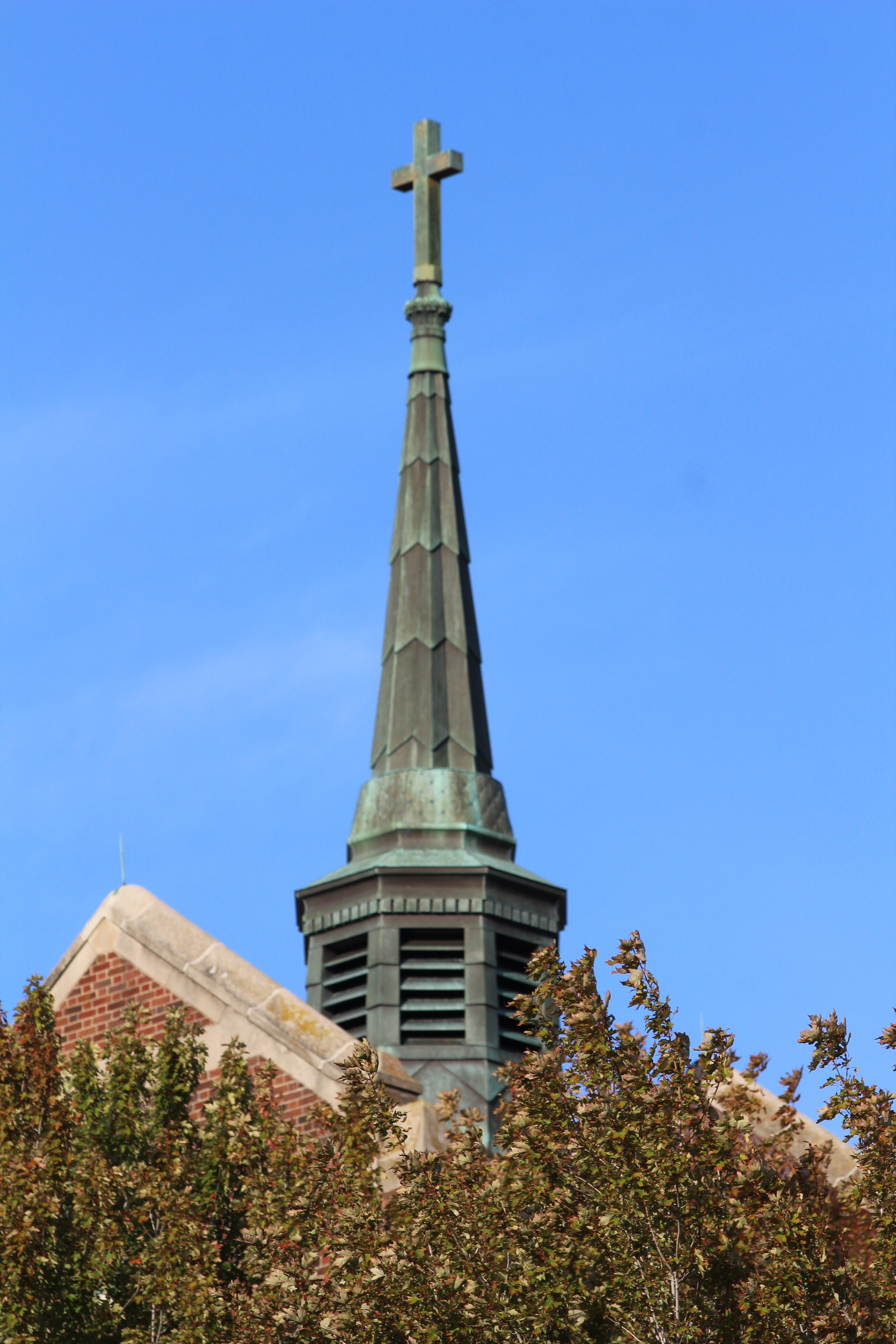
Chapel spire

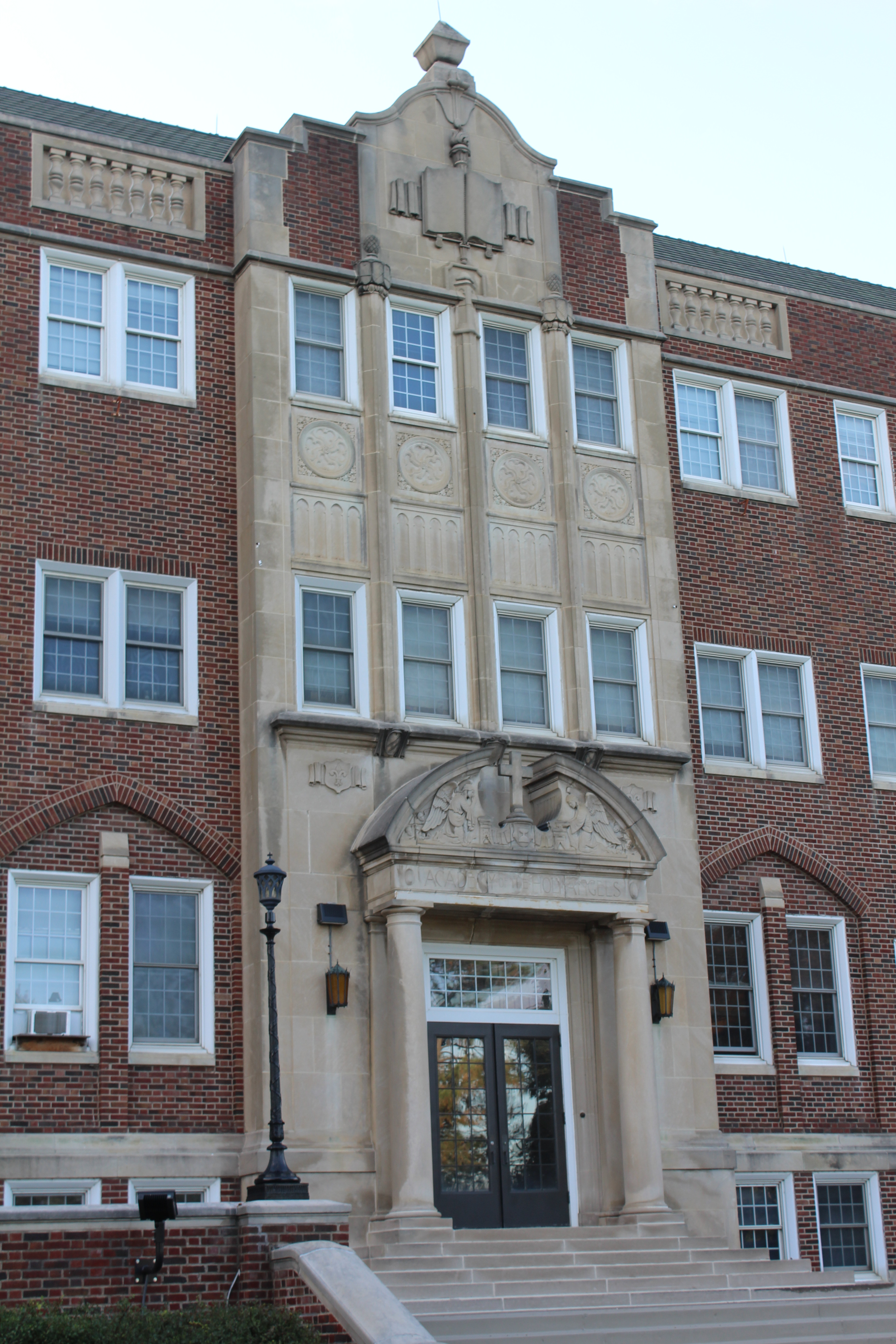
Front doorway

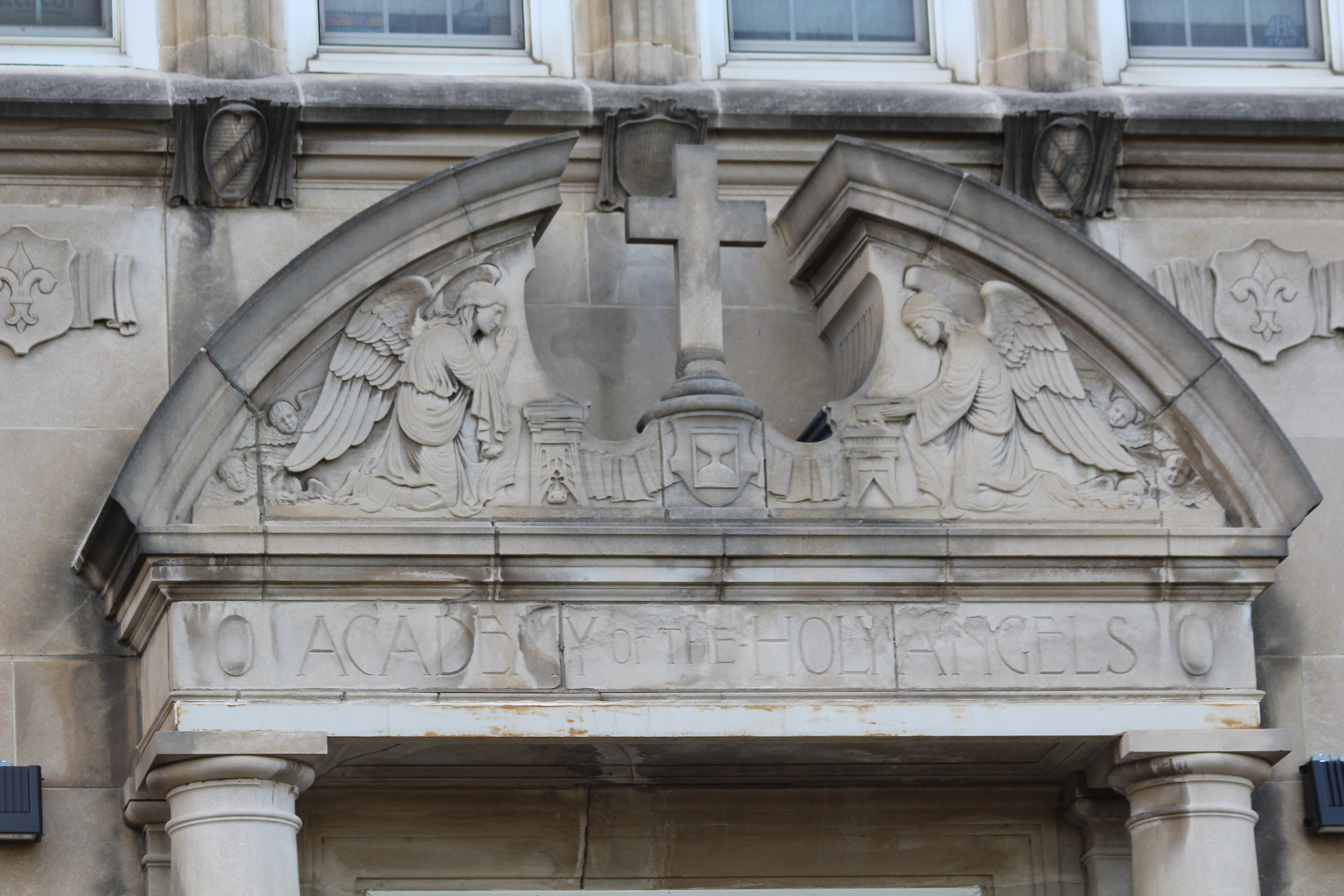
Arch detail above front doorway
