= David Paton (ophthalmologist) =

American physician (1930–2025)

- Born: August 16, 1930; Baltimore, Maryland, U.S.
- Died: April 3, 2025 (aged 94); Reno, Nevada, U.S.
- Occupations: Ophthalmologist, writer, memoirist
- Writing career
- Genre: Nonfiction

David Paton (August 16, 1930 – April 3, 2025) was an American ophthalmologist best known as founder in 1970 of Project Orbis (now named Orbis International, Inc.) and thereafter as its first medical director helping to develop (1970–1982) and then deploy its teaching aircraft for ophthalmologists worldwide, especially in the developing nations. Paton resigned from Orbis in 1987 and focused on other aspects of academic ophthalmology, but in 2011 he returned in a voluntary capacity to assist in fund raising for a new annual appointment, the David Paton Orbis Fellowship in Global Ophthalmology. David Paton died on April 3, 2025. He was 94 years old.

== Biography ==
Paton was born in Baltimore, Maryland, on August 16, 1930. He is the son of a prominent ophthalmologist, Richard Townley Paton, founder in 1946 of the world's first eye bank. His paternal grandfather, Stewart Paton MD was a neurologist and psychiatrist, and his maternal grandfather, Frederic Hill Meserve was a self-made businessman, and the first great collector of photographs of Abraham Lincoln, Civil War leaders, and other notable persons of the nineteenth century.

Paton was a graduate of Princeton University and The Johns Hopkins School of Medicine where he later served as a member of the faculty of the Wilmer Eye Institute. He was past chairman of The American Board of Ophthalmology, past first vice-president of The American Academy of Ophthalmology, and former chairman of the Department of Ophthalmology at Baylor College of Medicine.

In 2011, one year after his granddaughter Cricket Paton was born, Paton self-published his memoir, Second Sight: Views from An Eye Doctor's Odyssey. He died in Reno, Nevada on April 3, 2025, at the age of 94.

== Education and work ==
- 1937–43 – The Buckley School, NY, George Lane Nichols Award
- 1943–48 – The Hill School, PA, school president ‘48
- 1948–52 – Princeton University, B.A., Senior Class, vice president
- 1952–56 – Johns Hopkins School of Medicine, M.D.
- 1956–57 – Cornell University Medical College, NY, Internship
- 1957–59 – National Institutes of Health, MD, NINDB, Public Health Service
- 1959–64 – Johns Hopkins Hospital, Wilmer Eye Institute, Residency
- 1964–71 – Johns Hopkins Hospital, Wilmer Eye Institute, Faculty
- 1971–82 – Baylor College of Medicine, Houston, TX, Cullen Eye Institute, chairman and director
- 1982–84 – King Khaled Eye Specialist Hospital (KKESH), Riyadh, Saudi Arabia, medical director
- 1984–86 – OcuSystems, Inc., CT, founder, medical director
- 1986–93 – Weill Cornell Medical College, NY, professor, Catholic Medical Center of Brooklyn & Queens, Department of Ophthalmology, chairman
- 1998– – Baylor College of Medicine, Houston, TX, emeritus professor

== Awards and honors ==
=== Achievements ===
- Markle Scholar, Academic Medicine, 1967–72
- American College of Surgeons, Fellow, 1965–
- Johns Hopkins School of Medicine, dean, student admissions, 1967–70
- American Board of Ophthalmology, chairman 1981–81
- American Academy of Ophthalmology, secretary, continuing education, 1977–82
- American Academy of Ophthalmology, first vice president, 1982
- Project ORBIS, founder, medical director, 1968–87
- As teacher, surgeon and/or medical administrator: a cumulative four years in developing countries.
- Honorary member or honored guest of ten South American medical societies
- Over time, numerous international and domestic board memberships of domestic and international NGOs

=== DSc honorary degrees ===
- University of Bridgeport, 1984
- Princeton University, 1985

=== Other honors ===
- Legion of Honor, France, Chevalier, 1988
- Presidential Citizens Medal, US, 1987
- Princeton Class of ’52, Distinguished Classmate Award, 1992
- Johns Hopkins University School of Medicine, Distinguished Medical Alumnus Award, 2005
