= Mary Jo Copeland =

American humanitarian (born 1942)

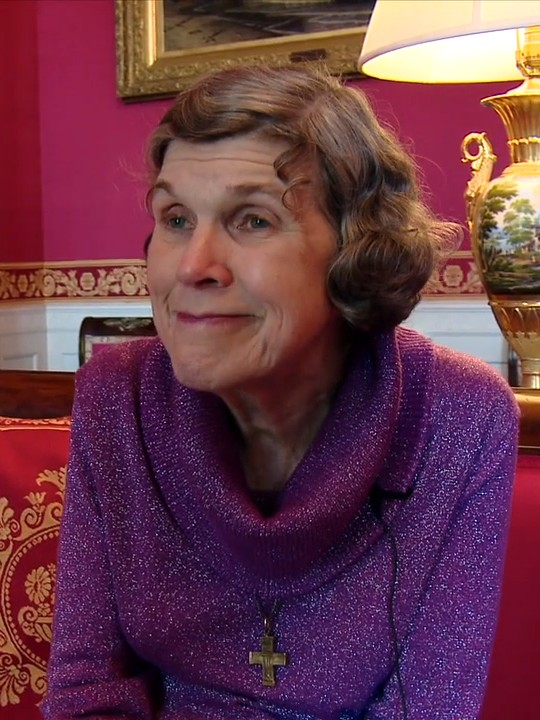
- Copeland in 2013
- Born: Mary Jo Holtby; October 23, 1942 (age 83); Rochester, Minnesota, U.S.
- Other names: America's Mother Teresa; Minnesota's Mother Teresa
- Education: Academy of Holy Angels
- Known for: Founding Sharing and Caring Hands
- Spouse: Dick Copeland
- Children: 12
- Awards: Presidential Citizens Medal

Mary Jo Copeland (née Holtby; born October 23, 1942) is an American humanitarian and founder of Sharing and Caring Hands, a center for those struggling with poverty and homelessness. Sometimes called "America's Mother Teresa", she received the Presidential Citizens Medal from Barack Obama in 2013 for her work with the poor at Sharing and Caring Hands.

== Early life ==
Born as Mary Jo Holtby in Rochester, Minnesota, on October 23, 1942, Copeland lived for the first six years of her life with her well-to-do grandparents. Her mother, a hairdresser, and her father, a Korean War veteran, took her back in when her brother John was born. Living with her parents, Copeland stated she was beaten by her father, who also abused Mary Jo's mother, and also occasionally slept in her own urine. From a young age, she recalls she found comfort in religion, stating that reading the Baltimore Catechism was like "breathing oxygen". Her experiences led her to vow to make the world a better place. She attended Annunciation parochial grade school in Minneapolis, where she received poor treatment from her classmates, and graduated from the Academy of Holy Angels in 1960.

As a sophomore in high school she met her future husband, Dick, at a sock hop after a basketball game at DeLaSalle High School in Minneapolis. They married in 1961.

While expecting her seventh child, Copeland endured a severe bout of depression. After the birth of her last child in 1977, her isolated lifestyle led her to use tranquilizer drugs and alcohol. She recounts that she overcame her addiction in 1982 during a "painful" three-month period, with support from her husband and prayer.

== Sharing and Caring Hands ==
After overcoming her addiction, Copeland began to volunteer at Catholic Charities. However, feeling overwhelmed by paperwork and bureaucracy, she acted on her own and brought food and clothing to those in need from the trunk of her car. In 1985, she received a $2500 grant ($7,309 in 2024) from a local TV station. Operations eventually began at 16 Glenwood Ave in Minneapolis.

By 1987, some 500 people were fed daily, with 600 and 700 on the weekends, totaling more than 10,000 lunches each month. Some 300 volunteers helped run the organization However, the city of Minneapolis sought to raze the building to make room for the Target Center; Copeland needed to raise $240,000 ($638,087 in 2024) by February 1988 to move to a new building two blocks away. The press coverage from the incident would allow her to fundraise to fund the new location at 425 N. 7th St. In 1995, Copeland opened Mary's Place, a transitional housing complex. Sharing and Caring Hands again was embroiled in controversy surrounding a sports stadium in 2008, when the newly built Target Field's proximity to the center raised concern's about the site's security and drug offenses happening on the site. The City of Minneapolis considered not renewing the license of Sharing and Caring Hands; seventeen arrests had been made at Sharing and Caring Hands in 2006 for drug offenses.

By 2020, 700 to 800 people per day were being fed at Sharing and Caring Hands. Copeland takes no salary. For many years, Copeland regularly washed the feet of the homeless twice daily, which was called her "trademark". Copeland clipped nails, applied ointment, and provided people with fresh sneakers; however, by 2022 her joints prevented her from continuing this ritual.

== Awards and honors ==
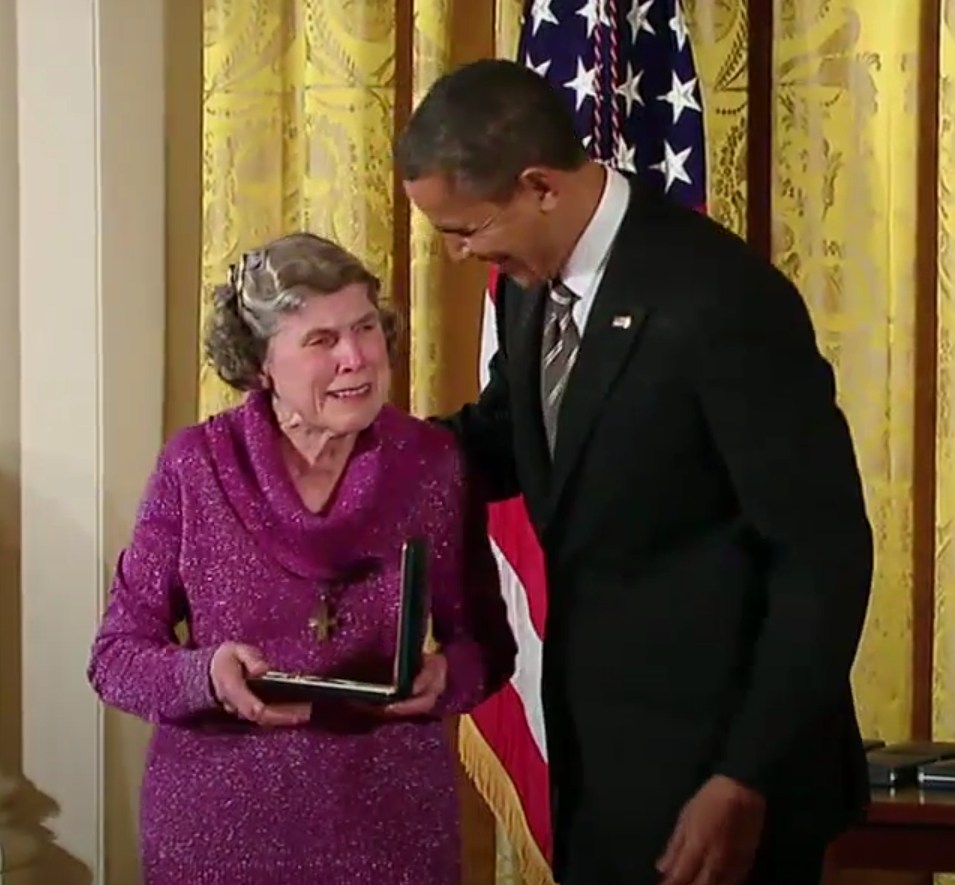
Copeland being awarded the Presidential Citizens Medal

She received the David W. Preus Leadership Award on October 7, 1991. Her high school alma mater, the Academy of Holy Angels, awarded her their Angelus Award for outstanding alumni in 1994. St. John's University in Collegeville, Minnesota awarded her their Pax Christi Award in on May 28, 1995. George W. Bush mentioned Copeland in his acceptance speech at the 2000 Republican National Convention, and brought her to his first National Prayer Breakfast in 2001. In 2024, Copeland was awarded the Hendickson Medal for Ethical Leadership by St. Mary's University of Minnesota.

Copeland has been called "America's Mother Teresa" and "Minnesota's Mother Teresa".

For her work with Sharing and Caring Hands, Copeland was selected in 2013 as one of 18 people from 6,000 nominations for the Presidential Citizens Medal, the second highest civilian honor in the United States. When she first heard of her selection in a call from the White House, she was overwhelmed in disbelief. Barack Obama awarded the medal to Copeland on February 15, 2013.

== Personal life ==
Copeland, together with her husband Dick, raised six daughters and six sons: Therese, Mary, Cathy, Jennifer, Barbara, Molly, Michael, Mark, Stephen, James, Jeff, and Matthew. As of 2022, she had fifteen grandchildren.

In 1991, it was reported that she would spend around two hours in prayer each morning at her Catholic parish of St. Alphonsus in Brooklyn Center.
