= Presidential Citizens Medal =

Award bestowed by the President of the United States

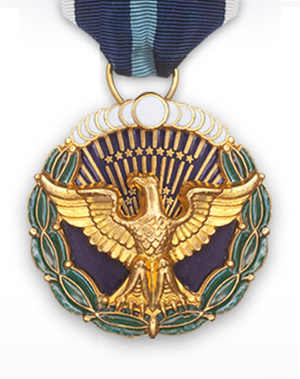
- Type: Medal
- Awarded for: "Exemplary deeds or services [performed] for his or her country or fellow citizens."
- Presented by: President of the United States
- Eligibility: Citizens of the United States
- Status: Active
- Established: 1969
- First award: 1973
- Ribbon of the medal

Precedence
- Next (higher): Presidential Medal of Freedom
- Next (lower): Public Safety Officer Medal of Valor

The Presidential Citizens Medal is an award bestowed by the president of the United States. It is the second-highest civilian award in the United States and is second only to the Presidential Medal of Freedom. Established by executive order on November 13, 1969, by President Richard Nixon, it recognizes an individual "who has performed exemplary deeds or services for his or her country or fellow citizens." Only United States citizens are eligible for the medal, which may be awarded posthumously.

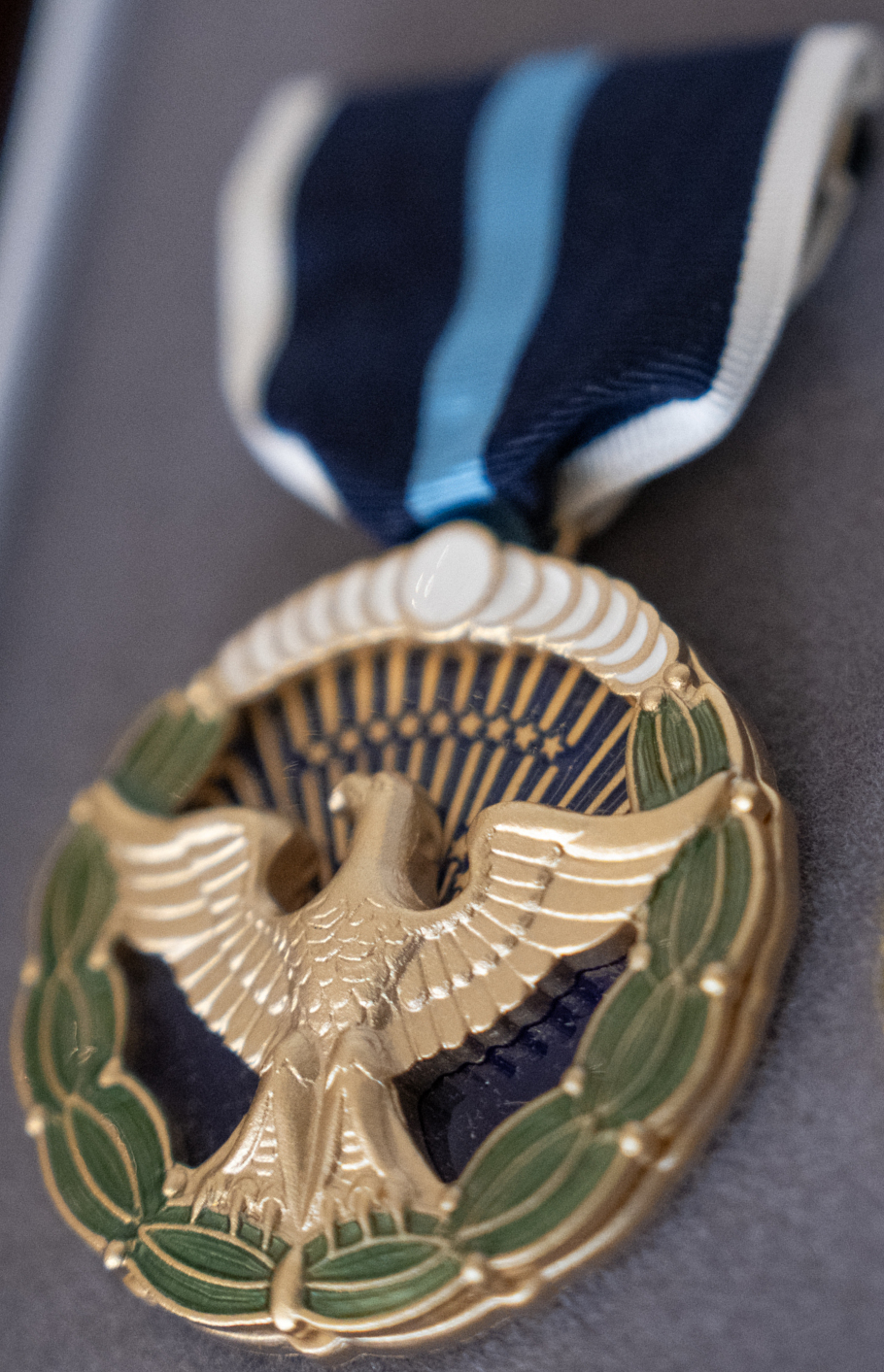
Presidential Citizens Medal prior to a ceremony at the White House on January 2, 2025

The medal is a disc of gilt and enamel, based on the seal of the president of the United States, with the eagle surrounded by a wreath of leaves. The medal is suspended on a ribbon, dark blue with a light blue central stripe and white edge stripes. Despite being a civilian award, it may be worn on some military uniforms.

== Recipients ==
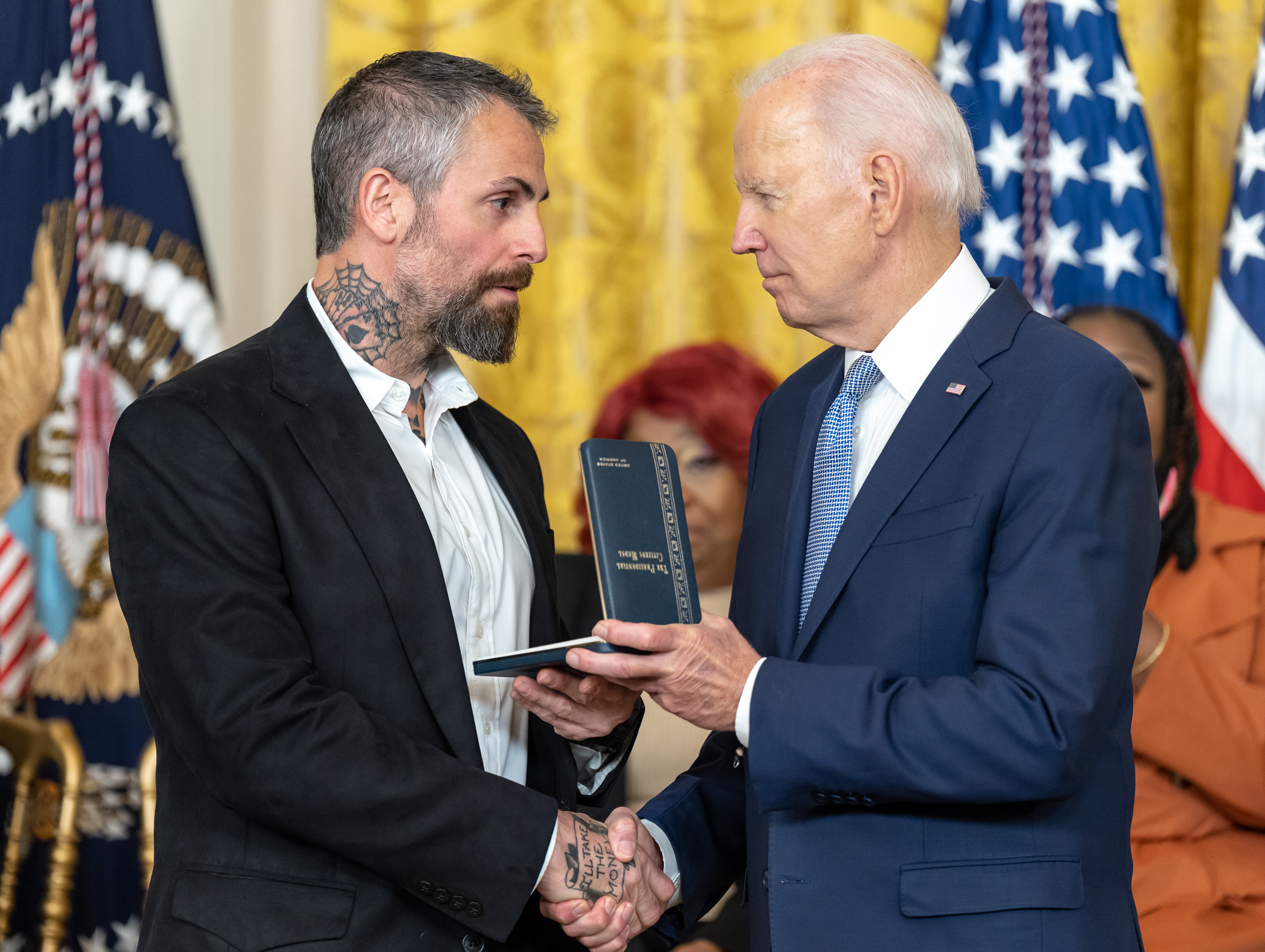
President Joe Biden presents the Presidential Citizens Medal to D.C. Metropolitan Police officer Michael Fanone during a ceremony on January 6, 2023

| Recipient | Posthumous? | Year | Awarded by | Citation | Notes |
|---|---|---|---|---|---|
| Roberto Clemente | yes | 1973 | Richard Nixon | "All who saw Roberto Clemente in action, whether on the diamond or on the front lines of charitable endeavor, are richer for the experience. He stands with that handful of men whose brilliance has transformed the game of baseball into a showcase of skill and spirit, giving universal delight and inspiration. More than that, his selfless dedication to helping those with two strikes against them in life blessed thousands and set an example for millions. As long as athletes and humanitarians are honored, Roberto Clemente's memory will live; as long as Citizens Medals are presented, each will mean a little more because this first one went to him." | First medal awarded |
| Henry "Hank" Aaron | | 2001 | Bill Clinton | A sports legend, Hank Aaron not only set baseball's all-time home-run record, but tore down racial barriers in the process. He played the game with extraordinary grace and skill despite encountering chilling discrimination, and he blazed a trail to baseball's front office for other African Americans. A staunch civil rights advocate and a champion of underprivileged children, Hank Aaron has shown us the thrill of victory and the importance of giving every American an equal opportunity to strive for it. (Note: "President Clinton Awards the Presidential Citizens Medals". August 25, 2002. Archived from the original on August 25, 2002.) | |
| Albert Abramson | No | 1998 | Bill Clinton | Abramson was a Maryland real estate developer and chairman of the United States Holocaust Memorial Museum's development committee. | |
| Muhammad Ali | | 2001 | Bill Clinton | The most celebrated boxer in history and a devoted social activist, Muhammad Ali continues to inspire us. Truly the "greatest of all time," Ali dominated boxing for two decades, winning an Olympic gold medal and becoming a three-time heavyweight champion of the world. With equal tenacity, through his advocacy for peace, tolerance, and compassion, he challenges our Nation to strive for equality and justice for all, earning our deepest respect and gratitude. | |
| Juan Andrade Jr. | | 2001 | Bill Clinton | As Co-Founder, President, and Executive Director of the United States Hispanic Leadership Institute, Juan Andrade has been a staunch advocate for America's Latino community. He has helped register more than a million new Latino voters and has worked to increase Hispanic representation at every level of government. Recognizing the promise of future generations, he has also dedicated himself to helping prepare young Hispanic Americans to become leaders of our Nation. | |
| Richard Lee Armitage | | 1989 | | | |
| Brooke Astor | | 1988 | | | |
| Hubert Dickey Ballantine | | 1982 | Ronald Reagan | The President of the United States of America awards the Presidential Citizens Medal to Martin Mathews" -- and the other certificate will read "to Mr. Dickey Ballantine." "The good works of Martin Mathews flow as deeply through the city of St. Louis as the Mississippi River itself. His inspiring contribution to bettering the lives of inner-city youth is a shining example of the power of good." (Note: "Remarks at the Mathews-Dickey Boys' Club in St. Louis, Missouri". www.reaganlibrary.gov. Archived from the original on April 15, 2021.) | Presented in St. Louis, Missouri on July 22 |
| Arnold O. Beckman | | 1989 | | | |
| Ezra Taft Benson | | 1989 | | | |
| Jocelyn Benson | | 2023 | | | |
| Mitchell Besser | | 2008 | | | |
| James H. Billington | | 2008 | | | |
| Forrest M. Bird | | 2008 | | | |
| Rusty Bowers | | 2023 | | | |
| James Scott Brady | | 1989 | | | |
| Dr. T. Berry Brazelton | | 2012 | Barack Obama | Brazelton is one of the foremost authorities on pediatrics and child development as well as an author and professor. One of Brazelton's best known achievements was the development of the Neonatal Behavioral Assessment Scale (NBAS), which is now used worldwide to recognize the physical and neurological responses of newborns, as well as emotional well-being and individual differences. In 1993, he founded the Brazelton Touchpoints Center® (BTC) at Boston Children's Hospital where he continues to promote strengths-based, family-centered care in pediatric and early education settings around the world. (Note: "President Obama to Honor Recipients of the 2012 Citizens Medal". White House. February 8, 2013. Archived from the original on February 16, 2017.) | |
| Ward Brehm | | 2008 | | | |
| Ruby Bridges | | 2001 | Bill Clinton | As a small, brave child, Ruby Bridges walked with courage past angry protestors and into the history books as the African American child who integrated her New Orleans school. Forty years later, she continues to show that same courage, rejecting bitterness to bring a message of love, faith, and acceptance to a new generation of Americans. | |
| Roberta Diaz Brinton | | 2010 | Barack Obama | Roberta Diaz Brinton has devoted her time and talents to improving science and technology education for Los Angeles students. As Director of the University of Southern California's Science, Technology and Research (STAR) Program, Brinton has opened the doors of opportunity for thousands of disadvantaged and minority inner-city youth. Brinton receives the Citizens Medal for encouraging America's next generations to reach for the stars. | Los Angeles, CA |
| Daisy M. Brooks | | 2010 | Barack Obama | When a pregnant teenager with no place to stay arrived at her door, Daisy Brooks welcomed the young woman in. What followed was a lifelong commitment to helping many of North Chicago's young mothers and their infants. Brooks opened Daisy's Resource and Developmental Center to serve as a dormitory, school, and catalyst for young women to improve their lives. Brooks receives the Citizens Medal for offering guidance and support. | Chicago, IL |
| Ronald H. Brown | yes | 2001 | Bill Clinton | Throughout his life, Ron Brown worked to eliminate racial barriers and create opportunity for all Americans. As the first African American to become a partner in his law firm, chairman of a major political party, and Secretary of Commerce, he showed us that we all benefit from an inclusive society. Opening international markets for American businesses and promoting commercial diplomacy, he demonstrated the value of cooperation and helped ensure America's leadership in the global economy. | |
| William F. Buckley Jr. | | 1989 | | | |
| Adam Burke | | 2012 | Barack Obama | Burke is an Iraq combat veteran and recipient of the Purple Heart which he received for injuries occurred by a mortar attack while running a combat operation in Iraq. In 2009 he opened "Veterans Farm," a 19 acre handicap-accessible farm that helps teach veterans of all ages how to make a living from the find healing in the land. He has been awarded numerous accolades for his work, including the 2011 Good Person of the Year award from the Good People Foundation and the Star of Honor from Work Vessels for Veterans. | |
| Don R. Cameron | | 2001 | Bill Clinton | A powerful voice for students and teachers, Don Cameron has worked with a pioneering spirit to address the challenges facing America's public schools. As Executive Director of the National Education Association and as Founding Co-Chair of the CEO Forum on Education and Technology, he has strived for almost 2 decades to ensure students have the talented teachers and technological skills they need to succeed in the 21st century. | |
| Frank C. Carlucci | | 1983 | | | |
| Raymond Castellani | | 1995 | | | |
| Raymond G. Chambers | | 2008 | | | |
| Betty Kwan Chinn | | 2010 | Barack Obama | Touched by childhood tragedy, Betty Chinn brings hope to those who have fallen on hard times. Left homeless as a child in China, Chinn became mute. When she came to America, she found both her voice and her mission: aiding those without shelter on our own shores. Today, Chinn provides meals twice a day as expressions of gratitude to a welcoming nation. Chinn receives the Citizens Medal for renewing America's promise by serving those in need. | Eureka, CA |
| Cynthia M. Church | | 2010 | Barack Obama | Cynthia Church turned a personal battle with cancer into a force for progress and change. Dismayed by the lack of resources for women of color with breast cancer, Church founded Sisters on a Mission, Inc, an African-American breast cancer support network in Delaware. Church receives the Citizens Medal for confronting the scourge of this terrible disease and working to halt its spread. | Wilmington, DE |
| Bruce Cole | | 2008 | | | |
| Charles Colson | | 2008 | | | |
| Mary Jo Copeland | | 2012 | Barack Obama | Copeland founded Sharing and Caring Hands in 1985, which has served as a safety net to those in the Minneapolis area through the provision of food, clothing, shelter, transportation, medical and dental assistance. Sharing and Caring Hands assists thousands of people a month, and is staffed almost entirely by volunteers. Copeland, who currently receives no salary for her work, has served as its director since its opening and still greets every client entering the center and conducts intake interviews. | |
| Carol Coston, O.P. | | 2001 | Bill Clinton | A tireless advocate for the poor and oppressed, Sister Carol Coston has worked with faith and vision to shape public policy that reflects Christian values. From promoting human rights and social justice to helping bring economic development to low-income areas, Sister Carol Coston has used her creative leadership and moral compass to build a more just society in America and around the world. | |
| Archibald Cox | | 2001 | Bill Clinton | A renowned jurist, distinguished law professor, and exemplary public servant, Archibald Cox has devoted his career to defending the rule of law. As Solicitor General, he argued numerous landmark civil rights cases before the U.S. Supreme Court; as Special Prosecutor during a time of constitutional crisis, he carried out his responsibilities with moral courage and uncompromising integrity; and as Chairman of Common Cause, he worked vigorously for campaign finance reform, insistent on a government of, by, and for the people. | |
| Chester A. Crocker | | 1989 | | | |
| Arthur Culvahouse Jr. | | 1989 | | | |
| Rachel D'Avino | yes | 2012 | Barack Obama | On December 14, 2012, the names of six courageous women were forever etched into the heart of our Nation as unthinkable tragedy swept through Newtown, Connecticut. Some of these individuals had joined Sandy Hook Elementary School only weeks before; others were preparing to retire after decades of service. All had dedicated themselves to their students and their community, working long past the school bell to give the children in their care a future worthy of their talents. | Killed in Sandy Hook Shooting |
| Joe Delaney | yes | 1983 | | | |
| Dr. Charles DeLisi | | 2001 | Bill Clinton | A pioneer and visionary, biophysicist Dr. Charles DeLisi has profoundly increased our knowledge about the building blocks of life. The first government scientist to outline the feasibility, goals, and parameters of the Human Genome Project, he helped to galvanize an international team of researchers to pool resources, create new technologies, and launch the monumental task of gene mapping and sequencing. | |
| Bob Dole | | 1989 | | | |
| Michael Dorman | | 2012 | Barack Obama | Dorman is the founder and executive director of Military Missions in Action, a North Carolina–based non-profit that helps veterans with disabilities, both physical and mental, achieve independent living. All veterans who have served are eligible to receive services including home modification, rehabilitation and family assistance. Since 2008, the organization has completed more than 100 home modification projects and shipped thousands of care packages to soldiers. | |
| General Wayne A. Downing, USA (Ret.) | | 2008 | | | |
| Samuel Nelson Drew | yes | 1995 | | | |
| Kenneth M. Duberstein | | 1989 | | | |
| Harry Dunn | | 2023 | | | |
| Lawrence Eagleburger | | 1991 | | | |
| Caroline Edwards | | 2023 | | | |
| Jaime Escalante | | 1988 | | | |
| Michael Fanone | | 2023 | | | |
| Mike Feinberg | | 2008 | | | |
| Edwin Feulner | | 1989 | | | |
| Arnold Fisher | | 2008 | | | |
| Max M. Fisher | | 1989 | | | |
| Zachary Fisher | | 1995 | | | |
| Marlin Fitzwater | | 1993 | | | |
| John P. Foley, S.J. | | 2008 | | | |
| Malcolm S. Forbes | | 1989 | | | |
| Donald R. Fortier | yes | 1989 | | | |
| Robert C. Frasure | yes | 1995 | | | |
| Ruby Freeman | | 2023 | | | |
| Robert M. Gates | | 1992 | | | |
| Robert P. George | | 2008 | | | |
| Susan Retik Ger | | 2010 | Barack Obama | Susan Retik Ger understands the importance of empowering women touched by personal tragedy. After losing her husband on September 11, 2001, she found cause in educating and training Afghan widows and their children. Her strength of spirit has healed hearts and fostered mutual understanding. Retik Ger receives the Citizens Medal for advancing women's rights and the power of America's ideals. | Needham, MA |
| Dana Gioia | | 2008 | | | |
| Maria Gomez | | 2012 | Barack Obama | Gomez founded Mary's Center 25 years ago with the mission to build better futures through the delivery of health care, family literacy and job training. Mary's Center is part of the working group launching First Lady Michelle Obama's "Let's Read Let's Move Campaign." Prior to establishing Mary's Center, Maria was a public health nurse with the D.C. Department of Health. She has also worked for the Red Cross, directing community education programming and disaster services, and with the Visiting Nurses Association. She currently serves as Regional Representative for the South East to the National Council of la Raza, and previously served two terms on the board of the Nonprofit Roundtable of Greater Washington. | |
| Aquilino Gonell | | 2023 | | | |
| Eugene Goodman | | 2023 | | | |
| C. Boyden Gray | | 1993 | | | |
| Jack Greenberg | | 2001 | Bill Clinton | In the courtroom and the classroom, Jack Greenberg has been a crusader for freedom and equality for more than half a century. Arguing 40 civil rights cases before the United States Supreme Court, including the historic Brown v. Board of Education, he helped break down the legal underpinnings of desegregation in America, and as a professor of law, an advocate for international human rights, and head of the NAACP Legal Defense and Educational Fund, he has helped shape a more just society. | |
| Elinor C. Guggenheimer | | 1997 | | | |
| Richard N. Haass | | 1991 | | | |
| Dorothy Height | | 1989 | | | |
| Charlton Heston | | 1989 | | | |
| David Hermelin | yes | 2000 | | | |
| John S. Herrington | | 1989 | | | |
| Samuel J. Heyman | | 2008 | | | |
| Colonel William R. (Rich) Higgins | yes | 1992 | | | |
| David D. Ho | | 2001 | Bill Clinton | One of the world's leaders in the fight against HIV/AIDS, David Ho has unraveled much of the mystery of the virus, helping us understand how it behaves and how it is best treated. His groundbreaking work using protease inhibitors in combination with standard therapies has ensured that thousands of people with AIDS live longer and healthier lives. For his tireless efforts and commitment to helping others, our nation is forever grateful. | |
| Dawn Hochsprung | yes | 2012 | Barack Obama | On December 14, 2012, the names of six courageous women were forever etched into the heart of our Nation as unthinkable tragedy swept through Newtown, Connecticut. Some of these individuals had joined Sandy Hook Elementary School only weeks before; others were preparing to retire after decades of service. All had dedicated themselves to their students and their community, working long past the school bell to give the children in their care a future worthy of their talents. | Killed in Sandy Hook Shooting |
| Don Hodel | | 1989 | | | |
| Daniel Hodges | | 2023 | | | |
| Mary K. Hoodhood | | 2010 | Barack Obama | Physical limitations have not hindered Mary K. Hoodhood's determination to strengthen her community. Though a car accident left her paralyzed, Hoodhood began volunteering to feed the hungry through her local Meals on Wheels program. In 2001, Hoodhood founded Kids' Food Basket which provides meals to thousands of children in the Grand Rapids, Michigan area. Hoodhood receives the Citizens Medal for her remarkable efforts. | Grand Rapids, MI |
| Leamon Hunt | | 1984 | | | |
| Janice Jackson | | 2012 | Barack Obama | Jackson is the creator and program director of Women Embracing Abilities Now, (W.E.A.N.) a nonprofit mentoring organization servicing women and young ladies with varying degrees of disabilities. She is also a professor at The University of Baltimore. Jackson has actively advocated on behalf of people with disabilities and currently serves on the board of directors for The League for People with Disabilities, the Hoffberger Center for Professional Ethics at the University of Baltimore, and The Image Center of Maryland. She also serves on the Community Advisory Council at the Maryland Center for Developmental Disabilities at Kennedy Krieger Institute, and is a counselor at Kernan Rehabilitation Center. She has also founded two support groups, We Are Able People (W.R.A.P.) and Women On Wheels & Walking (W.O.W.W.). | |
| Pamela Green Jackson | | 2012 | Barack Obama | Green Jackson is the Founder and CEO of the Youth Becoming Healthy Project (YBH), a non-profit organization committed to reducing the epidemic of childhood obesity through nutrition, fitness education and physical activity programs. YBH was created in memory of Pamela Green Jackson's only brother, Bernard Green, who died in 2004 from obesity-related illnesses. YBH provides resources for during and after school wellness programs for elementary and middle school students as well as a summer wellness camp where the students learn about exercise, nutrition and can participate in martial arts, walking club and dance programs. | |
| Bernice Young Jones | | 1996 | | | |
| Dr. I. King Jordan | | 2001 | Bill Clinton | As the first deaf president of Gallaudet University, Dr. I. King Jordan has become a hero, mentor, and tireless advocate for people who are deaf or hard of hearing. Trained in psychology, he has been a champion of higher education, and he played a key role in the passage of the Americans with Disabilities Act. Through his extraordinary leadership and achievements, Dr. Jordan has raised international awareness of the importance of self-determination and full integration for all people with disabilities. | |
| Herman Kahn | yes | 1989 | | | |
| Max Kampelman | | 1989 | | | |
| Dennis Keogh | yes | 1984 | | | |
| Richard James Kerr | | 1991 | | | |
| Robert M. Kimmitt | | 1991 | | | |
| Russell Kirk | | 1989 | Ronald Reagan | | |
| Lane Kirkland | | 1989 | | | |
| Wendy Kopp | | 2008 | | | |
| Joseph C. Kruzel | | 1995 | | | |
| Donald W. Landry | | 2008 | | | |
| Patience Lehrman | | 2012 | Barack Obama | Lehrman is an immigrant from Cameroon and the National Director of Project SHINE (Students Helping in the Naturalization of Elders), an immigrant integration initiative at the Intergenerational Center of Temple University. SHINE partners with 18 institutions of higher learning, community-based organizations, and county and city governments across the country. SHINE engages college students and older adults to provide language and health education, citizenship and civic participation lessons to immigrant communities. Lehrman also mentors inner-city high school students, provides free meals to low-income children in the summer and serves as an election official. She holds three Masters Degrees from Temple University. | |
| Dave Levin | | 2008 | | | |
| Anthony Lewis | | 2001 | Bill Clinton | Revered by colleagues and readers alike for his Pulitzer prize-winning reporting, profound insight, and broad understanding of constitutional law, Anthony Lewis has set the highest standard of journalistic ethics and excellence. A staunch defender of freedom of speech, individual rights, and the rule of law, he has been a clear and courageous voice for democracy and justice. | |
| Howard Liebengood | yes | 2023 | | | |
| Alan Lovelace | | 1981 | | | |
| Jeanne Manford | | 2012 | Barack Obama | Manford and her husband, Jules, co-founded in 1972 a support group for parents of gay children that grew into the national organization known as Parents, Families and Friends of Lesbians and Gays (PFLAG). Manford had always supported her son Morty, but was inspired to act after the police failed to intervene while Morty was beaten and hospitalized during a Gay Activists Alliance demonstration in April 1972. In the years that followed, Manford continued to march and organize, even after losing Morty to AIDS in 1992. Today, PFLAG focuses on creating a network of support and advancing equality for lesbian, gay, bisexual, and transgender people. Manford died in early January at the age of 92. | |
| Adair Margo | | 2008 | | | |
| Robert S. Martin | | 2008 | | | |
| John O. Marsh, Jr. | | 1989 | | | |
| Andrew W. Marshall | | 2008 | | | |
| Martin Mathews | | 1982 | Ronald Reagan | The President of the United States of America awards the Presidential Citizens Medal to Martin Mathews" -- and the other certificate will read "to Mr. Dickey Ballantine." "The good works of Martin Mathews flow as deeply through the city of St. Louis as the Mississippi River itself. His inspiring contribution to bettering the lives of inner-city youth is a shining example of the power of good." | Presented in St. Louis, Missouri on July 22 |
| Oseola McCarty | | 1995 | | | |
| Kimberly McGuiness | | 2010 | Barack Obama | Parent and advocate, Kimberly McGuiness has been a true champion for deaf students. Her persistent letters, phone calls, and visits to state legislators helped spur the passage of Georgia's Deaf Child's Bill of Rights. She has led workshops, counseled parents, and changed lives, raising awareness and support for deaf education. McGuiness receives the Citizens Medal for demonstrating the results one citizen can achieve. | Cave Spring, GA |
| Richard Meadows | yes | 1995 | | | |
| Bob Michel | | 1989 | | | |
| Jeffery L. Miller | | 2008 | | | |
| Billy Mills | | 2012 | Barack Obama | Mills co-founded and serves as the spokesman for Running Strong for American Indian Youth, an organization that supports cultural programs and provides health and housing assistance for Native American communities. Mills gained prominence during the 1964 Tokyo Olympics, when he unexpectedly won a Gold Medal in the 10,000 meter run. Today, he remains the only American to ever win this event. At the time Mills competed in the Olympics, he was a First Lieutenant in the United States Marine Corps. After the Olympics, Mills, an Oglala Lakota, was made a warrior by his tribe. In 1986, Mills and Eugene Krizek, president of Christian Relief Services, joined forces to found Running Strong. | |
| Irene Morgan | | 2001 | Bill Clinton | When Irene Morgan boarded a bus for Baltimore in the summer of 1944, she took the first step on a journey that would change America forever. Refusing to surrender her seat to a white couple, she was arrested, tried, and fined for breaking segregation laws. With courage and tenacity, she appealed her conviction and won a landmark Supreme Court victory that outlawed segregation in interstate transportation and helped make America a more just society. | |
| Erwin Morse | | 2008 | | | |
| Wandrea' ArShaye Moss | | 2023 | | | |
| Constance Baker Motley | | 2001 | Bill Clinton | A key legal strategist of the civil rights movement, Constance Baker Motley waged the battle for equality in the courtroom and, with quiet courage and remarkable skill, won landmark victories that dismantled segregation in America. As a dedicated public servant and distinguished judge, she has broken down political, social, and professional barriers, and her pursuit of equal justice under law has widened the circle of opportunity in America. | |
| Jorge Muñoz | | 2010 | Barack Obama | Jorge Muñoz recognizes that we all have a stake in one another. By giving his time, energy, and resources to feeding the hungry, he has demonstrated the enduring American values of sacrifice and kindness. Muñoz receives the Citizens Medal for his service and dedication to creating a more hopeful tomorrow for the less fortunate among us. | New York City, NY |
| Anne Marie Murphy | yes | 2012 | Barack Obama | On December 14, 2012, the names of six courageous women were forever etched into the heart of our Nation as unthinkable tragedy swept through Newtown, Connecticut. Some of these individuals had joined Sandy Hook Elementary School only weeks before; others were preparing to retire after decades of service. All had dedicated themselves to their students and their community, working long past the school bell to give the children in their care a future worthy of their talents. | Killed in Sandy Hook Shooting |
| William H. Natcher | | 1994 | | | |
| Lisa Nigro | | 2010 | Barack Obama | Beginning with a wagon full of coffee and sandwiches, Lisa Nigro's mission to aid those living on the streets of Chicago has inspired us all. Her wagon gave way to a restaurant for homeless men and women, expanding with partner organizations to provide housing, job training, and vital support to Chicagoans affected by poverty. Nigro receives the Citizens Medal for her tireless service to her fellow citizens. | Chicago, IL |
| David Paton | | 1987 | Ronald Reagan | Co-founder of Project ORBIS, a humanitarian NGO dedicated to saving eyesight worldwide. | |
| Claiborne Pell | | 1994 | | | |
| Pete Peterson | | 2000 | | | |
| MaryAnn Phillips | | 2010 | Barack Obama | Caring for America's injured service members, MaryAnn Phillips embodies strength and grace. An American citizen living in Germany, Phillips volunteers with Soldiers Angels at Landstuhl Regional Medical Center. She spends countless hours at the bedsides of our wounded warriors and their families, caring for them, encouraging them, and grieving with them. Phillips receives the Citizens Medal for putting her patriotism into action for our troops and our nation. | Star Valley Ranch, WY |
| General Colin Powell USA (Ret) | | 1989 | | | |
| Donald E. Powell | | 2008 | | | |
| Elizabeth Cushman Titus Putnam | | 2010 | Barack Obama | Devoted to preserving our nation's public lands, Elizabeth Cushman Titus Putnam has inspired thousands of America's youth to protect our natural bounty. Her vision to offer land restoration and maintenance service opportunities became a reality with the birth of the Student Conservation Association. Putnam receives the Citizens Medal for helping ensure that our nation's treasured public lands are enjoyed by future generations. | Shaftsbury, VT |
| Anne-Imelda Radice | | 2008 | | | |
| Arnold Lewis Raphel | yes | 1989 | | | |
| Rick Rescorla | yes | 2019 | Donald Trump | | |
| Rozanne L. Ridgeway | | 1989 | | | |
| Helen Rodriguez-Trias | | 2001 | Bill Clinton | A dedicated pediatrician, outstanding educator, and dynamic leader in public health, Dr. Helen Rodriguez-Trias has strived to ensure full and equal access to health care for all. With unwavering conviction, she has challenged discriminatory practices in health care, encouraged community involvement in creating healthy environments, worked to prevent the spread of AIDS, and advocated for improving women's and children's health. Throughout her career, she has met every challenge with wisdom, strength, and compassion. | |
| Adele Langston Rogers | No | 1973 | Richard Nixon | Adele Rogers accompanied her husband, Secretary of State William P. Rogers on trips to 75 countries during his four years tenure. She was a director of the National School Volunteer Program and an advisory board member of the Hospitality and Information Service. | |
| John F. W. Rogers | | 1985 | | | |
| Edward L. Rowny | | 1989 | | | |
| Edward Roybal | | 2001 | Bill Clinton | A devoted public servant for 43 years, Edward Roybal was at the forefront of efforts to advance civil rights, establish rural mental health programs, fund AIDS research, and improve support services for veterans and the elderly. As founder of the Congressional Hispanic Caucus, he created a national forum for Hispanic issues and opened doors for a new generation of Hispanic American leaders. | |
| Robert Rubin | | 2001 | Bill Clinton | Leaving a brilliant career on Wall Street to serve as Director of the National Economic Council and Secretary of the Treasury, Robert Rubin played a pivotal role in creating America's longest economic expansion. He forged a new team approach that produced an economic framework based on fiscal discipline, investment in opportunity, and expanded trade, while exhibiting exceptional leadership in ensuring global financial stability. His efforts helped countless Americans share in an era of unprecedented prosperity. | |
| Senator Warren Rudman | | 2001 | Bill Clinton | Warren Rudman has always put his country first, whether fighting for freedom in the Korean War, defending the Constitution as a United States Senator, promoting fiscal discipline as Co-Founder of the Concord Coalition, or helping to shape national security policy as Chairman of the President's Foreign Intelligence Advisory Board. Forthright and courageous, he has consistently rejected partisanship and created a remarkable legacy of public service. | |
| Charles Ruff | yes | 2001 | Bill Clinton | A distinguished lawyer and exceptional public servant, Charles Ruff dedicated his career to advancing the cause of justice. Whether serving as Watergate Special Prosecutor, Acting Deputy Attorney General, United States Attorney, Corporation Counsel for the District of Columbia, or Counsel to the President, he fulfilled his demanding responsibilities with singular judgment, integrity, and devotion to the rule of law. Wise and compassionate, he used his extraordinary skills to strengthen our nation's legal system and revitalize our nation's capital. | |
| Myrtle Faye Rumph | | 2010 | Barack Obama | For decades, Myrtle Faye Rumph has lent her talent and compassion to impacting the lives of at-risk youth. Her commitment to reducing gun and gang violence in her community has steered countless young men and women away from dangerous habits, and altered the course of their futures. Rumph receives the Citizens Medal for her tireless efforts to replace violence and despair in her community with a beacon of hope and humanity. | Inglewood, CA |
| Lauren Rousseau | yes | 2012 | Barack Obama | On December 14, 2012, the names of six courageous women were forever etched into the heart of our Nation as unthinkable tragedy swept through Newtown, Connecticut. Some of these individuals had joined Sandy Hook Elementary School only weeks before; others were preparing to retire after decades of service. All had dedicated themselves to their students and their community, working long past the school bell to give the children in their care a future worthy of their talents. | Killed in Sandy Hook Shooting |
| Elbert Rutan | | 1986 | | | |
| Richard Rutan | | 1986 | | | |
| Al Schmidt | | 2023 | | | |
| Rabbi Arthur Schneier | | 2001 | Bill Clinton | A Holocaust survivor, Rabbi Arthur Schneier has devoted a lifetime to overcoming the forces of hatred and intolerance. As an international envoy, Chairman of the Commission for the Preservation of America's Heritage Abroad, and founder and president of the Appeal of Conscience Foundation, he has set an inspiring example of spiritual leadership by encouraging interfaith dialogue and intercultural understanding and promoting the cause of religious freedom around the world. | |
| Timothy R. Scully, C.S.C. | | 2008 | George W. Bush | Catholic priest and political science professor. | |
| Eli J. Segal | | 2001 | Bill Clinton | As founder of AmeriCorps and the first Chief Executive Officer of the Corporation for National and Community Service, Eli Segal has galvanized the American spirit of community and helped us realize the dream of a vital civilian service corps. As President and Chief Executive Officer of the Welfare-to-Work Partnership, he has brought businesses and communities together to create opportunity for welfare recipients, enabling them to experience the power, dignity, and independence of work. Juan Andrade, Jr. [sic] | |
| John F. Seiberling | | 2001 | Bill Clinton | An ardent advocate for the environment, John F. Seiberling has demonstrated a profound commitment to America's natural treasures. Championing numerous bills during his 17 years in Congress, including the Alaska Lands Act, John Seiberling safeguarded millions of acres of parks, forests, wildlife refuges, and wilderness areas. Working in a spirit of bipartisanship, he also promoted civil rights and worker rights, always striving to improve the quality of life in America. | |
| John Sengstacke | yes | 2001 | Bill Clinton | A lifetime crusader for equal opportunity for African Americans, John Sengstacke used the power of the press to bring our nation closer to its ideals. As owner, publisher, and editor of the legendary Chicago Defender, he provided a national forum for African American issues, nurtured the talents of generations of African American journalists, and played a crucial role in helping to integrate the Armed Forces, major league baseball, the U.S. Postal Service, and the White House press corps. | |
| Mary Sherlach | yes | 2012 | Barack Obama | On December 14, 2012, the names of six courageous women were forever etched into the heart of our Nation as unthinkable tragedy swept through Newtown, Connecticut. Some of these individuals had joined Sandy Hook Elementary School only weeks before; others were preparing to retire after decades of service. All had dedicated themselves to their students and their community, working long past the school bell to give the children in their care a future worthy of their talents. | Killed in Sandy Hook Shooting |
| Terry Shima | | 2012 | Barack Obama | Shima was drafted into the US Army on October 12, 1944 as a replacement for the 442nd Regimental Combat Team. This unit was composed of Japanese Americans who volunteered for combat duty. In November 2011, the US Congress awarded the Congressional Gold Medal collectively to the 442nd RCT, the 100th Battalion and the Military Intelligence Service. Shima served as Executive Director of the Japanese American Veterans Association (JAVA), a nonprofit organization that publicizes and assists Japanese American military veterans and their families, from 2004 to 2012 and is now chair of its Outreach and Education Committee. | |
| The Rev. Fred L. Shuttlesworth | | 2001 | Bill Clinton | As Founder of the Alabama Christian Movement for Human Rights and Co-Founder of the Southern Christian Leadership Conference, the Reverend Fred Shuttlesworth endured imprisonment, assault, and the bombing of his home to integrate Birmingham's public facilities. A hero of the civil rights movement and a freedom fighter motivated by his faith in God, he taught all Americans that freedom and justice are worth any price. | |
| Brian Sicknick | yes | 2023 | | | |
| Gary Sinise | | 2008 | | | |
| Jeffrey L. Smith | yes | 2023 | | | |
| Victoria Leigh Soto | yes | 2012 | Barack Obama | On December 14, 2012, the names of six courageous women were forever etched into the heart of our Nation as unthinkable tragedy swept through Newtown, Connecticut. Some of these individuals had joined Sandy Hook Elementary School only weeks before; others were preparing to retire after decades of service. All had dedicated themselves to their students and their community, working long past the school bell to give the children in their care a future worthy of their talents. | Killed in Sandy Hook Shooting |
| Larry Speakes | | 1987 | | | |
| Stuart K. Spencer | | 1989 | | | |
| Adrian St. John | | 1995 | | | |
| William Howard Taft IV | | 1989 | | | |
| Elizabeth Taylor | | 2001 | Bill Clinton | A screen legend, Elizabeth Taylor has captured the hearts of audiences around the world, portraying some of the most memorable characters in film history. A dedicated leader in the fight against AIDS, she has focused national attention on this devastating disease. With grace, style, and compassion, she has reminded us of our responsibility to reach out to those in need. | |
| Edward Teller | | 1989 | | | |
| Strom Thurmond | | 1989 | | | |
| Richard H. Truly | | 1989 | | | |
| Armando Valladares | | 1989 | | | |
| John Volpe | | 1983 | | | |
| Vernon A. Walters | | 1989 | | | |
| Admiral James D. Watkins, USN (Ret.) | | 2008 | | | |
| Raymond Weeks | No | 1982 | Ronald Reagan | Organized the first Veterans Day observance in 1947 in Birmingham, Alabama. Credited with making Armistice Day into Veterans Day. | |
| Geo. J. Weiss Jr. | | 2010 | Barack Obama | George Weiss, Jr., a veteran of World War II and the United States Marine Corps, reflects our nation's generous and selfless heart. In 1979, he founded the Fort Snelling Memorial Rifle Squad, which today consists of more than 125 volunteers who have performed final military honors for more than 55,000 deceased veterans. Weiss receives the Citizens Medal for his extraordinary service to our nation's veterans and their families. | Marine, MN |
| John C. Whitehead | | 1989 | | | |
| Charles Z. Wick | | 1989 | | | |
| Marion Wiesel | | 2001 | Bill Clinton | Convinced that our greatest hope for a just society is to teach tolerance and mutual respect, Marion Wiesel has worked with creativity and compassion to combat hatred and injustice. Whether writing a haunting documentary about the children of the Holocaust, translating her husband's work, or helping young Ethiopians in Israel to thrive and succeed in a new land, she is replacing despair with dignity and overcoming ignorance with understanding. | |
| Harris Wofford | | 2012 | Barack Obama | Wofford served as a U.S. Senator from Pennsylvania from 1991 to 1995, and from then to 2001 was the chief executive officer of the Corporation for National and Community Service. From 1970 to 1978 he served as the fifth president of Bryn Mawr College. He is a noted advocate of national service and volunteering. He began his public service career as counsel to the Rev.Theodore Hesburgh on the U.S. Commission on Civil Rights and was an early supporter of the Civil Rights movement in the South in the late 1950s. He became a volunteer advisor and friend of Martin Luther King, Jr. In 1961, Kennedy appointed him as special assistant to the President for civil rights. He was instrumental in the formation of the Peace Corps and served as the Peace Corps' special representative to Africa and director of operations in Ethiopia. On his return to Washington in 1964, he was appointed associate director of the Peace Corps. In 1966 he became the founding president of the State University of New York's College at Old Westbury. | |
| Robert L. Woodson, Sr. | | 2008 | | | |
| Patrisha Wright | | 2001 | Bill Clinton | Widely regarded as "The General" guiding the campaign to pass the Americans with Disabilities Act, Patrisha Wright has been a driving force in the battle against discrimination based on disability. Through her tireless efforts to forge relationships with the civil rights community, defend disability rights, and promote progressive legislation, she has helped break down barriers to equality of opportunity, enabling people with disabilities to participate more fully in our society. | |
| Joseph R. Wright, Jr. | | 1989 | | | |
| Sidney R. Yates | | 1993 | | | |
| Jeana Yeager | | 1986 | | | |
| Tony Zale | | 1990 | | | |
| Steve and Liz Alderman | | 2011 (Note: "2011 Presidential Citizens Medal Recipients". The White House. October 20, 2011.) | Obama | After Liz and Steve Alderman lost their son, Peter, in the World Trade Center attack on September 11, 2001, they founded the Peter C. Alderman Foundation. The Foundation works to heal the emotional wounds of victims of terrorism and mass violence by establishing clinics in post-conflict countries including Cambodia, Uganda, Rwanda, and Haiti. The Aldermans receive the Citizens Medal for aiding the victims of conflict who might otherwise go unaided. | |
| Clarence Lee Alexander | | 2011 | Obama | Sometimes called the "grandfather of tribal government" in Alaska for his long-held role as Chief of Fort Yukon, Clarence Alexander has worked extensively to clean up the Yukon River, resulting in the closure of numerous open-burning dumps and the removal or recycling of millions pounds of waste. Alexander receives the Citizens Medal for demonstrating how much good a dedicated leader can accomplish. | |
| Camilla Bloomquist | | 2011 | Obama | For more than 30 years, Milly Bloomquist has created and operated numerous programs to help the poor and underserved in Penn Yan, New York. She founded Food for the Needy and Christmas for the Needy, and recently implemented the Weekend Backpack Program in Yates County, which provides children free meals at their schools. Bloomquist receives the Citizens Medal for her lifelong commitment to serving those in need. | |
| Judith Broder | | 2011 | Obama | In 2004, Judith Broder created The Soldiers Project, which has worked to meet the mental health needs of service members, their families, and returning veterans. The Soldiers Project seeks to decrease the disruptive effects of repeated deployments, enhance post-deployment transition and re-integration, and mitigate suffering related to PTSD, TBI, substance abuse, domestic violence, and depression. Broder receives the Citizens Medal for her dedication to those who serve this country. | |
| Vijaya Emani | | 2011 | Obama | Vijaya Emani became a role model for victims of domestic abuse because of her strength and determination in overcoming domestic abuse in her own life. She broke a long held taboo in the Indian American community by speaking out about the issue publicly. Although she was killed in a tragic vehicle accident, her example and message live on. Emani posthumously receives the Citizens Medal for her courage in overcoming and speaking out against abuse. | |
| John Keaveney | | 2011 | Obama | In 1992, John Keaveney, a Vietnam combat veteran, founded New Directions, a home for homeless and disabled veterans with addiction and mental health problems. Keaveney overcame personal struggles and turned his life around in the 1980s. He decided that no veteran who asked for help should suffer what he did. When he began his program, he made a promise that no veteran would leave it unless he had a suit, a place to stay, and an income. Keaveney receives the Citizens Medal for ensuring that America keeps its promises to veterans. | |
| Roger Kemp | | 2011 | Obama | Roger Kemp faced the ultimate parent's nightmare when his daughter Ali, 19, was killed in the summer of 2002. In response Kemp created The Ali Kemp Defense Education (TAKE) Foundation. Inspired by his belief that his daughter could have survived if she had an edge on her attackers, TAKE has trained more than 46,000 women in self-defense. Kemp receives the Citizens Medal for working to empower young women to prevent themselves from becoming victims. | |
| Janice Langbehn | | 2011 | Obama | While on vacation with her family in February 2007, Janice Langbehn's partner, Lisa Pond, suddenly fell ill and was rushed to the hospital. Langbehn was refused access to her partner, who had experienced a brain aneurysm and later died alone. She filed a federal lawsuit and her story received attention from President Obama, who went on to revise hospital visitation rights for gay and lesbian couples for hospitals receiving federal Medicare or Medicaid funds. Langbehn receives the Citizens Medal for her efforts to ensure all Americans are treated equally. | |
| Ida Martin | | 2011 | Obama | Ida Martin created Bluffton Self Help to assist working families, disabled residents, and senior citizens in the Bluffton, South Carolina area when they suffered a financial crisis. In 2010 alone, Bluffton Self Help provided food to 11,600 people and clothing to almost 9,000 people. Additionally, Bluffton Self Help provided families with short-term emergency financial assistance toward housing and utility assistance, medical assistance, or children's program assistance. Martin receives the Citizens Medal for providing relief to many in moments of despair. | |
| Margaret Martin | | 2011 | Obama | After observing LA gang members stop at a Hollywood market to listen to a kid playing Brahms on a small violin, she founded the Harmony Project in 2001 to make quality arts education available to those in the most underserved, gang-reduction zones of Los Angeles. The organization has provided instruments and tuition-free music lessons to thousands of children in Los Angeles who would otherwise have no access to classical music. Martin receives the Citizens Medal for replacing violence in children's lives with music. | |
| Michelle McIntyre-Brewer | | 2011 | Obama | Michelle McIntyre-Brewer is a military spouse, mother, and founder of Soldier's List. She founded Soldier's List in 2003 to support high-risk service members and their families. Soldier's List has sent tens of thousands of care packages around the world providing critical medical relief. McIntyre-Brewer works diligently with the military community to educate families about their rights and responsibilities within Tricare and other services offered. McIntyre-Brewer receives the Citizens Medal for going above and beyond on behalf of our troops and their families. | |
| Roberto Perez | | 2011 | Obama | As President of Alfalit, a non-profit organization combating illiteracy, Roberto Perez has led the charge for fighting illiteracy from Africa to South America. The organization has helped 7 million people learn to read in 22 countries. Perez previously worked as a social worker and as an ordained Methodist Pastor counseling prison inmates and recovering alcoholics. Perez receives the Citizens Medal for his passion and work on behalf of the less fortunate around the globe. | |
| Mary L. Bonauto | | 2025 (Note: "President Biden Announces Recipients of the Presidential Citizens Medal". The White House. January 2, 2025. Archived from the original on January 2, 2025.) | Biden | Attorney and activist Mary Bonauto first fought to legalize same-sex marriage in Vermont, Massachusetts, Connecticut, and Maine before arguing before the Supreme Court in Obergefell v. Hodges, which established marriage equality as the law of the land. Her efforts made millions of families whole and forged a more perfect Union. | |
| Bill Bradley | | 2025 | Biden | Raised in small-town Missouri, Bill Bradley showed a dedication to basketball that would define his courage, discipline, and selflessness. A two-time NBA Champion and Hall-of-Fame New York Knick, he served three terms as a United States Senator from New Jersey and was a candidate for president, advancing tax reform, water rights, civil rights, and more, while still today seeking to deepen our common humanity with humility and heart. | |
| Frank K. Butler, Jr. | | 2025 | Biden | As a pioneering innovator, Navy Seal, and leader in dive medicine, Dr. Frank Butler introduced Tactical Combat Casualty Care to the medical world that set new standards for tourniquet use not only for injuries in war, but injuries across daily civilian life. He has transformed battlefield trauma care for the United States military and saved countless lives. | |
| Elizabeth L. Cheney | | 2025 | Biden | Throughout two decades in public service, including as a Congresswoman for Wyoming and Vice Chair of the Committee on the January 6 attack, Liz Cheney has raised her voice—and reached across the aisle—to defend our Nation and the ideals we stand for: Freedom. Dignity. And decency. Her integrity and intrepidness remind us all what is possible if we work together. | |
| Christopher J. Dodd | | 2025 | Biden | Chris Dodd has served our Nation with distinction for more than 50 years as a United States Congressman, Senator, respected lawyer, and diplomat. From advancing childcare, to reforming our financial markets, to fostering partnerships across the Western Hemisphere—he has stood watch over America as a beacon to the world. | |
| Diane Carlson Evans | | 2025 | Joe Biden | After serving as an Army nurse during the Vietnam War, Diane Carlson Evans founded the Vietnam Women's Memorial Foundation to ensure female service members received the recognition they deserve—one of our Nation's most sacred obligations. Her duty and devotion embody the very best of who we are as Americans. | |
| Joseph L. Galloway | yes | 2025 | Joe Biden | From Vietnam to the Persian Gulf, Joe Galloway spent decades sharing first-hand accounts of horror, humanity, and heroism in battle. Known as the soldier's reporter and the soldier's friend, he embedded with American troops, rescued wounded soldiers under fire, and became the only civilian awarded a Bronze Star for combat valor by the United States Army as one of the most respected war correspondents of his era. | |
| Nancy Landon Kassebaum | | 2025 | Joe Biden | The first woman to represent Kansas, Nancy Kassebaum was a force in the United States Senate. From supporting a woman's right to choose to reforming health care, she stood up for what she believed in even if it meant standing alone, and she reached across the aisle to do what she believed was right. | |
| Ted Kaufman | | 2025 | Joe Biden | For decades, including as a United States Senator from Delaware, Ted Kaufman has served the Nation with honesty and integrity. A master of the Senate who championed everyday Americans and public servants, he's been at the forefront of consequential debates about the courts, the financial system, and more. | |
| Carolyn McCarthy | | 2025 | Joe Biden | As a nurse, Carolyn McCarthy had an instinct to heal and serve. When her husband and son were shot on a local commuter train, she became an advocate so persuasive that she was recruited to run for Congress. She served 18 years, championing gun safety measures including improved background checks, as a citizen legislator devoted to protecting our Nation's welfare. | |
| Louis Lorenzo Redding | yes | 2025 | Joe Biden | A groundbreaking civil rights advocate, Louis was the first Black attorney admitted to the bar in Delaware, where he argued against segregation in the seminal cases of Bulah v. Gebhart and Belton v. Gebhart—laying the legal framework for Brown v. Board of Education. A towering figure and a generous mentor, he opened doors of equity and opportunity for all Americans. | |
| Bobby Sager | | 2025 | Joe Biden | A Boston native, Bobby Sager travels the world as a photographer and philanthropist grounded in family and empathy, wielding his camera and influence to connect with people in war-torn countries, capture their hope and humanity, and inspire others to take action and see a fuller portrait of the planet we all share. | |
| Collins J. Seitz | yes | 2025 | Joe Biden | As a state judge in Delaware, Judge Seitz became the first judge in America to integrate a white public school, dismantling the doctrine of "separate but equal" with exacting detail and reverence for the equal protection clause of the 14th Amendment of our Constitution. His brave ruling tore down walls of separation to help us see each other as fellow Americans. | |
| Eleanor Smeal | | 2025 | Joe Biden | From leading massive protests and galvanizing women's votes in the 1970s to steering progress for equal pay and helping the Violence Against Women Act become law, Ellie Smeal forced the Nation to not only include women in political discourse but to value them as power brokers and equals. Her strategic vision over more than 40 years embodies the American pursuit to create a fairer, more just world. | |
| Bennie G. Thompson | | 2025 | Joe Biden | Born and raised in a segregated Mississippi, as a college student inspired by the Civil Rights movement, Bennie Thompson volunteered on campaigns and registered southern Black voters. That call to serve eventually led him to Congress, where he chaired the House January 6th Committee—at the forefront of defending the rule of law with unwavering integrity and a steadfast commitment to truth. | |
| Mitsuye Endo Tsutsumi | yes | 2025 | Joe Biden | In a shameful chapter in our Nation's history, Mitsuye Endo was incarcerated alongside more than 120,000 Japanese Americans. Undaunted, she challenged the injustice and reached the Supreme Court. Her resolve allowed thousands of Japanese Americans to return home and rebuild their lives, reminding us that we are a Nation that stands for freedom for all. | |
| Thomas J. Vallely | | 2025 | Joe Biden | A United States Marine during the Vietnam War, Thomas Vallely has never given up on peace. Over the course of five decades, he has brought Vietnam and the United States together—establishing Fulbright University Vietnam, fostering greater economic and cultural exchange, and overcoming the perils of the past to seize the promise of the future. His service remains a symbol of American leadership in the world. | |
| Frances M. Visco | | 2025 | Joe Biden | As president of the National Breast Cancer Coalition, Fran Visco has fought tirelessly and fearlessly to increase Federal funding for breast cancer research, early detection education, and access to women's healthcare. As a breast cancer survivor, she turned pain into purpose, changed the landscape of breast cancer advocacy, and has become a powerful symbol of hope for the Nation. | |
| Paula S. Wallace | | 2025 | Joe Biden | A lifelong educator and trailblazer of the arts, Paula Wallace dreamt of a school that would transform how we think about professional education. By establishing the esteemed Savannah College of Art and Design and serving as its president, she has guided thousands of students into creative industries. | |
| Evan Wolfson | | 2025 | Joe Biden | By leading the marriage equality movement, Evan Wolfson helped millions of people in all 50 states win the fundamental right to love, marry, and be themselves. For 32 years, starting with a visionary law school thesis, Evan Wolfson worked with singular focus and untiring optimism to change not just the law, but society—pioneering a political playbook for change and sharing its lessons, even now, with countless causes worldwide. | |

Most of the recipients of the 2023 Citizens Medal were awarded for their respective roles in the 2020 United States presidential election or their response to the subsequent January 6 United States Capitol attack in 2021. Due to the COVID-19 pandemic, their awards were delayed in 2021 and 2022.

== See also ==
- Awards and decorations of the United States government
- List of awards for volunteerism and community service
