= 2016 Republican National Convention =

U.S. political event held in Cleveland, Ohio

Coordinates: 41.4966°N 81.6883°W

- 2016 presidential election

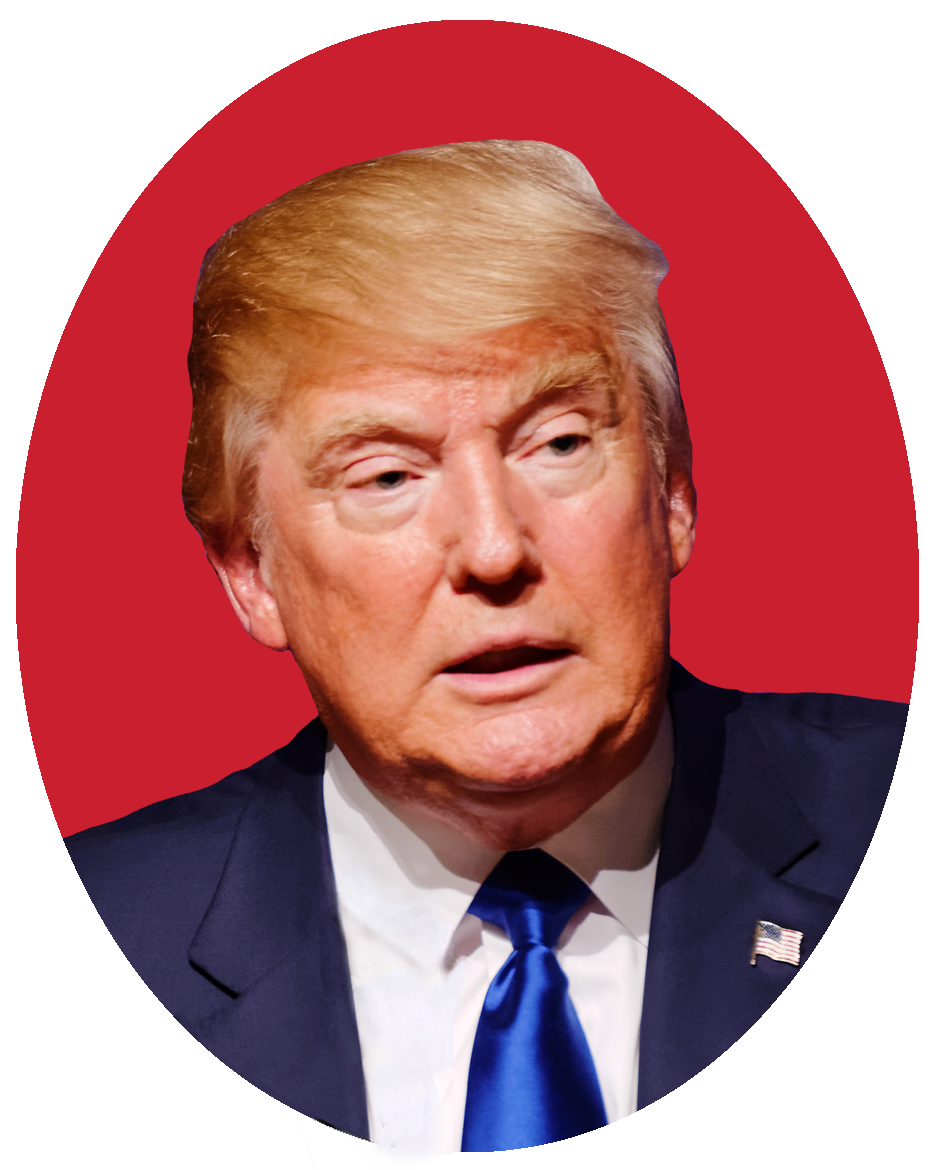
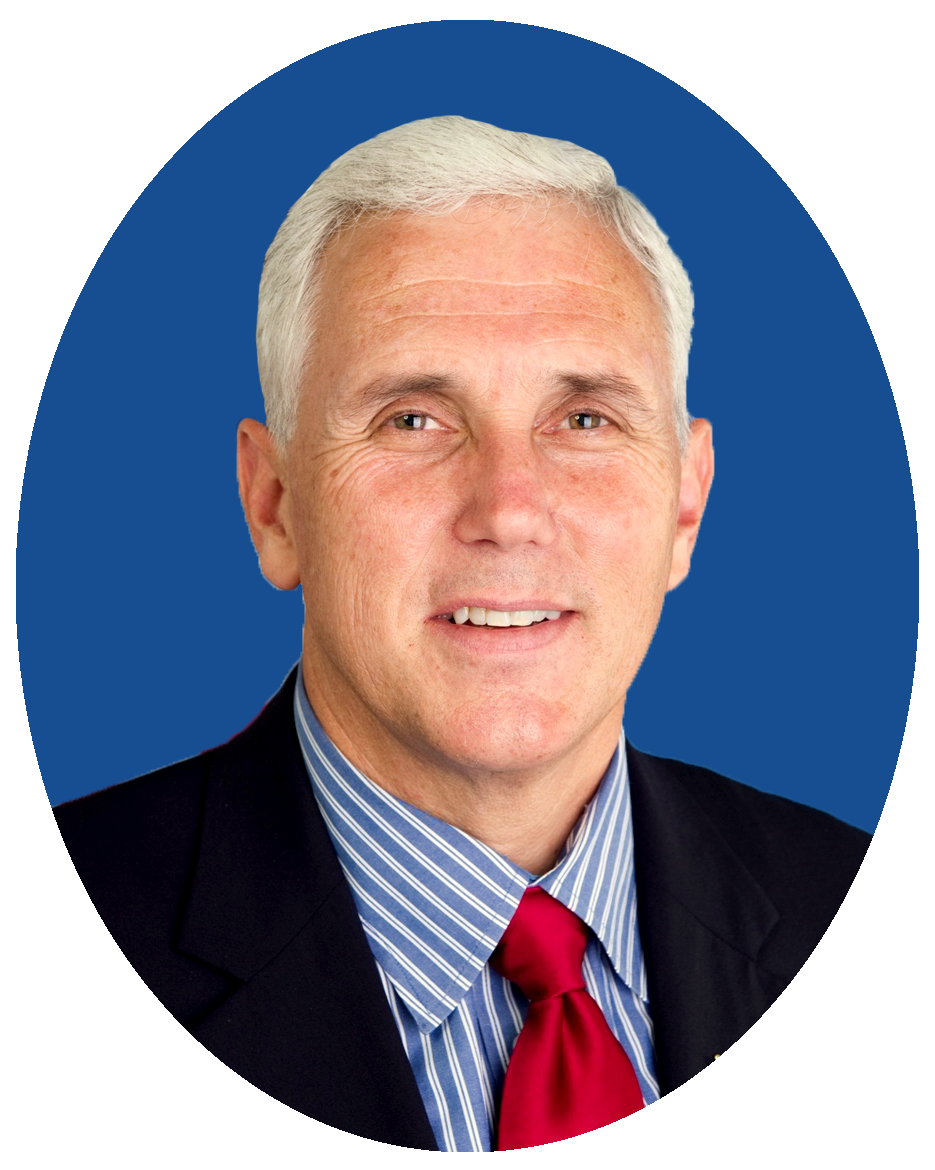
- Nominees; Trump and Pence

Convention
- Dates: July 18–21, 2016
- City: Cleveland, Ohio
- Venue: Quicken Loans Arena
- Chair: Paul Ryan
- Keynote speaker: Joni Ernst
- Notable speakers: See below

Candidates
- Presidential nominee: Donald Trump of New York
- Vice-presidential nominee: Mike Pence of Indiana

Voting
- Total delegates: 2,472
- Votes needed for nomination: 1,237 (Simple Majority)
- Results (president): Trump (NY): 1,725 (69.78%); Cruz (TX): 484 (19.58%); Kasich (OH): 125 (5.06%); Rubio (FL): 123 (4.98%); Carson (MI): 7 (0.28%); Bush (FL): 3 (0.12%); Paul (KY): 2 (0.08%); Abstention: 3 (0.12%)
- Results (vice president): Pence (IN): 100% (Acclamation)
- Ballots: 1

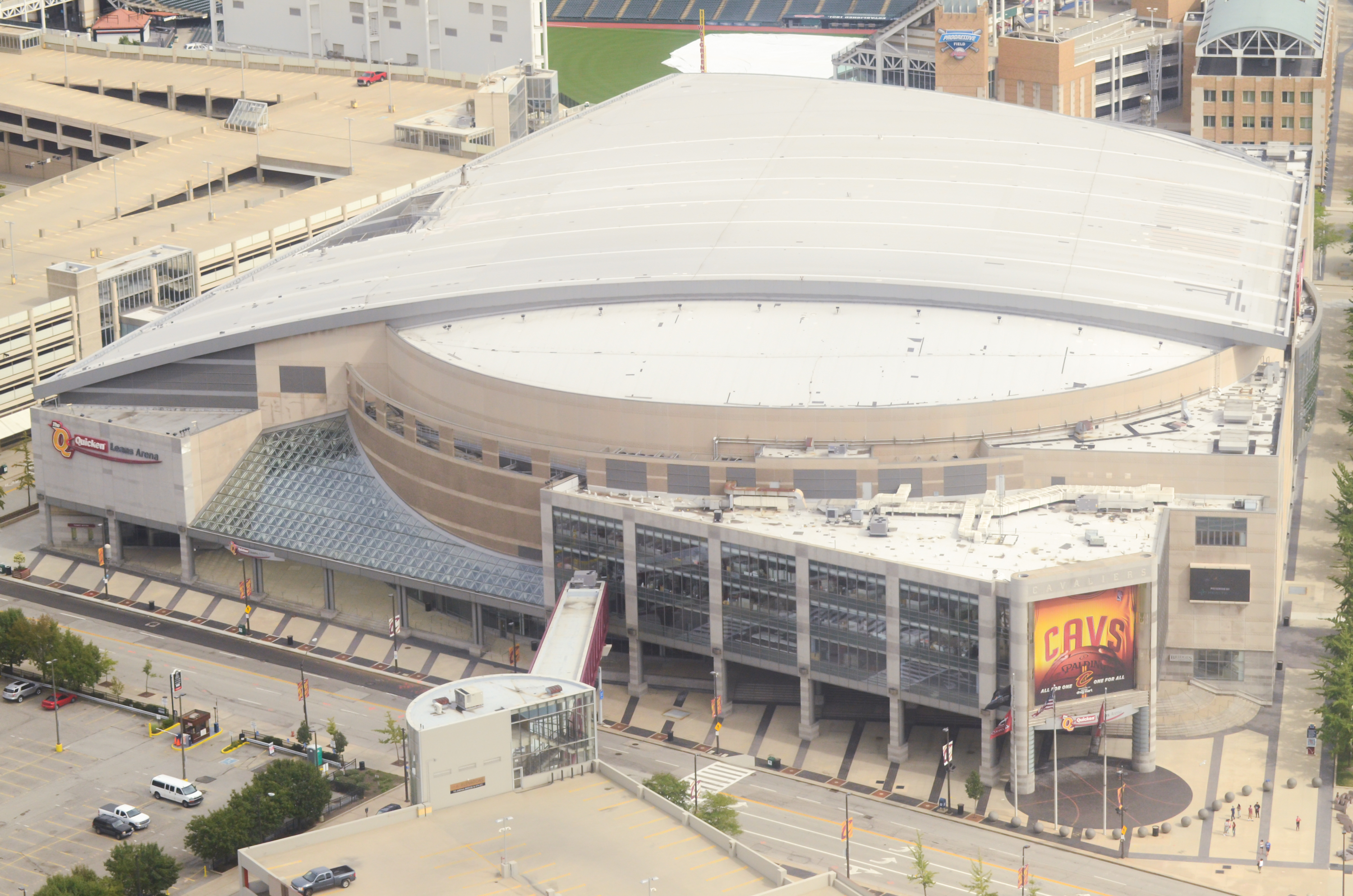
Quicken Loans Arena, the site of the 2016 Republican National Convention

Sites of the 2016 national presidential nominating conventions. Blue, red, green, and yellow indicate the conventions for the Democratic, Republican, Green, and Libertarian parties, respectively.

The 2016 Republican National Convention, in which delegates of the United States Republican Party chose the party's nominees for president and vice president in the 2016 U.S. presidential election, was held July 18–21, 2016, at Quicken Loans Arena (now Rocket Arena) in Cleveland, Ohio. The event marked the third time Cleveland has hosted the Republican National Convention and the first since 1936. In addition to determining the party's national ticket, the convention ratified the party platform.

There were 2,472 delegates to the Republican National Convention, with a simple majority of 1,237 required to win the presidential nomination. Most of those delegates were bound for the first ballot of the convention based on the results of the 2016 Republican presidential primaries. On July 19, 2016, the convention formally nominated Donald Trump for president and Indiana governor Mike Pence for vice president. Trump and Pence went on to win the general election, defeating the Democratic ticket of Hillary Clinton and Tim Kaine.

== Background ==
In 2016, both the Democratic and Republican conventions were held before the Summer Olympics instead of after, as was the case in 2008 and 2012. One reason the Republican Party scheduled their convention in July was to help avoid a longer, drawn-out primary battle similar to what happened in 2012, which left the party fractured heading into the general election and eventually led to Mitt Romney losing the election to Barack Obama. The Democratic Party then followed suit, scheduling their convention in Philadelphia the week after the Republicans' convention, to provide a quicker response. On May 3, Republican National Committee chairman Reince Priebus declared Donald Trump the presumptive nominee after Texas senator Ted Cruz dropped out of the race. The next day, Ohio Governor John Kasich suspended his campaign, effectively making Trump the presumptive Republican presidential nominee. Trump was the first presidential nominee of a major party since Wendell Willkie, the Republican candidate in 1940, who has held neither political office nor a high military rank prior to his nomination. He was also the first presidential nominee of a major party without political experience since General Dwight D. Eisenhower first captured the Republican presidential nomination in 1952. This was the first Republican National Convention to be held entirely in July since 1980. Twitter and CBS News live streamed the convention via Twitter.

=== Site selection ===
On April 2, 2014, the Republican National Committee announced that Cincinnati, Cleveland, Dallas, Denver, Kansas City and Las Vegas were the finalists for hosting the convention. In late June 2014, Cleveland and Dallas were announced as the final two contenders to be the host city. Cleveland was selected on July 8, 2014.

=== Host Committee ===
The 2016 Cleveland Host Committee, an Ohio nonprofit corporation with no political affiliation, was the official and federally designated Presidential Convention Host Committee for the convention. It is responsible for "organizing, hosting and funding" the convention; it also aims "to promote Northeast Ohio and ensure Cleveland is best represented, and to lessen the burden of local governments in hosting the 2016 Republican National Convention". The Host Committee is composed of prominent Ohio business executives, civic leaders, and other community leaders. David Gilbert, CEO of Destination Cleveland and the Greater Cleveland Sports Commission, is the president and CEO of the host committee. Organizers have found it hard to raise the money needed to put on the convention, which is normally supported by corporate donations. Corporations that donated hundreds of thousands of dollars to the 2012 convention but nothing in 2016 include JPMorgan Chase, General Electric, Ford Motor Company, Motorola Solutions and Amgen. Reluctance to be associated with Trump, or concern that the convention might be disrupted by floor fights or violence, were sometimes cited as factors in the decision to withhold funds. In July as the convention got under way, the Cleveland Host Committee said it had raised $58 million of its $64 million goal. They asked billionaire Sheldon Adelson, who often contributes to Republicans, to make up the $6 million shortfall.

Quicken Loans Arena was selected in July 2014 as the host site for the 2016 Republican National Convention. The arena hosted the first Republican presidential debate of the 2016 election, aired by Fox News Channel, on August 6, 2015. The convention was held July 18–21, 2016.

The Cleveland 2016 Host Committee, who "facilitated construction of the 'cloakroom" space' for Republican lawmakers, which consisted of an "exclusive office, lounge and gathering space" built on the Cleveland Cavaliers practice court, received $923,100 from the Friends of the House 2016 LLC". Bank records obtained by the Center for Public Integrity show that Comcast, Microsoft, the American Petroleum Institute, Chevron, Koch Companies Public Sector, PhRMA, and other trade and lobby groups "funded a limited liability company called 'Friends of the House 2016 LLC' to pay for the 'cloakroom.'

=== Security arrangements and planning ===
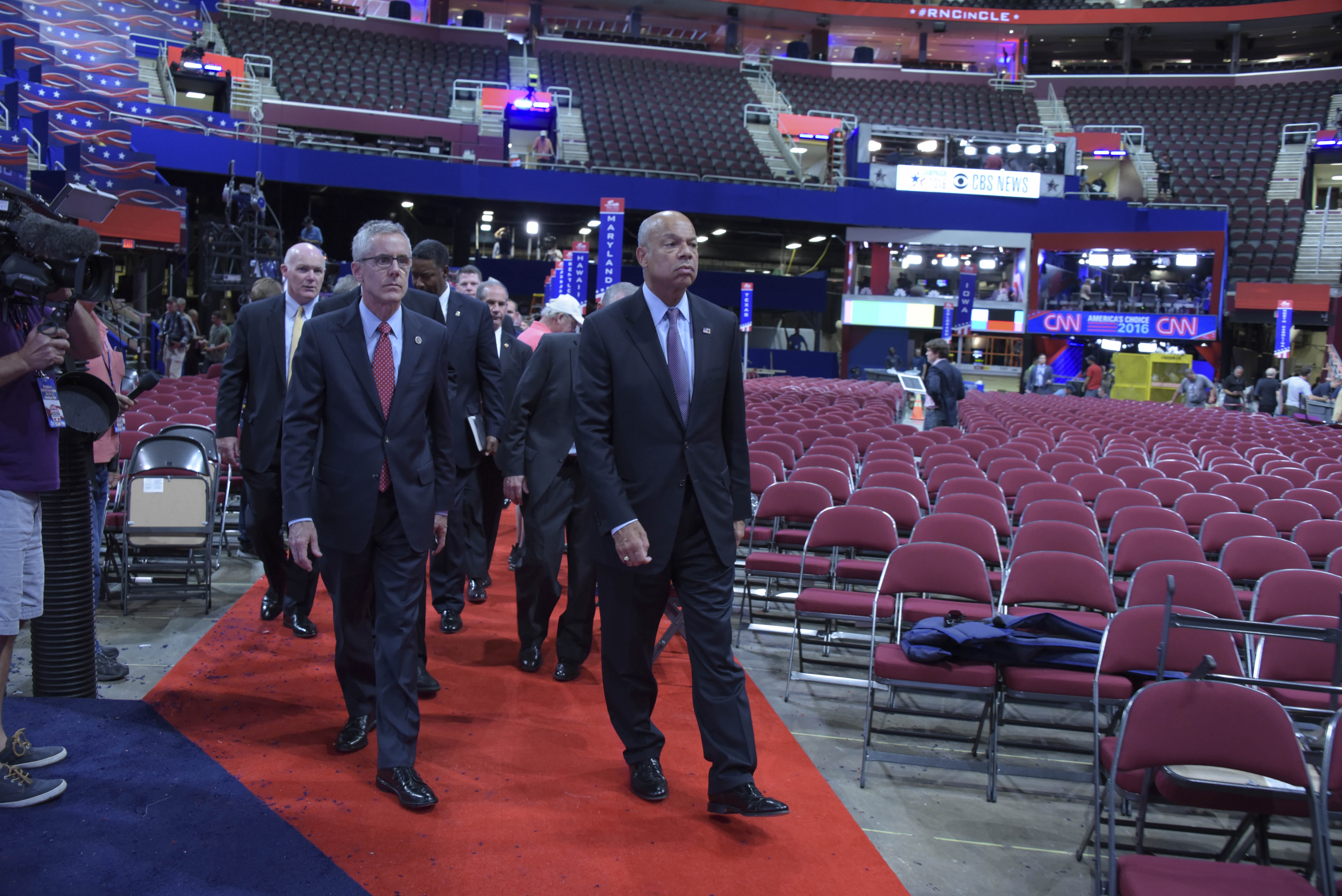
Jeh Johnson, the secretary of Homeland Security, inspects the venue on July 15, 2016.

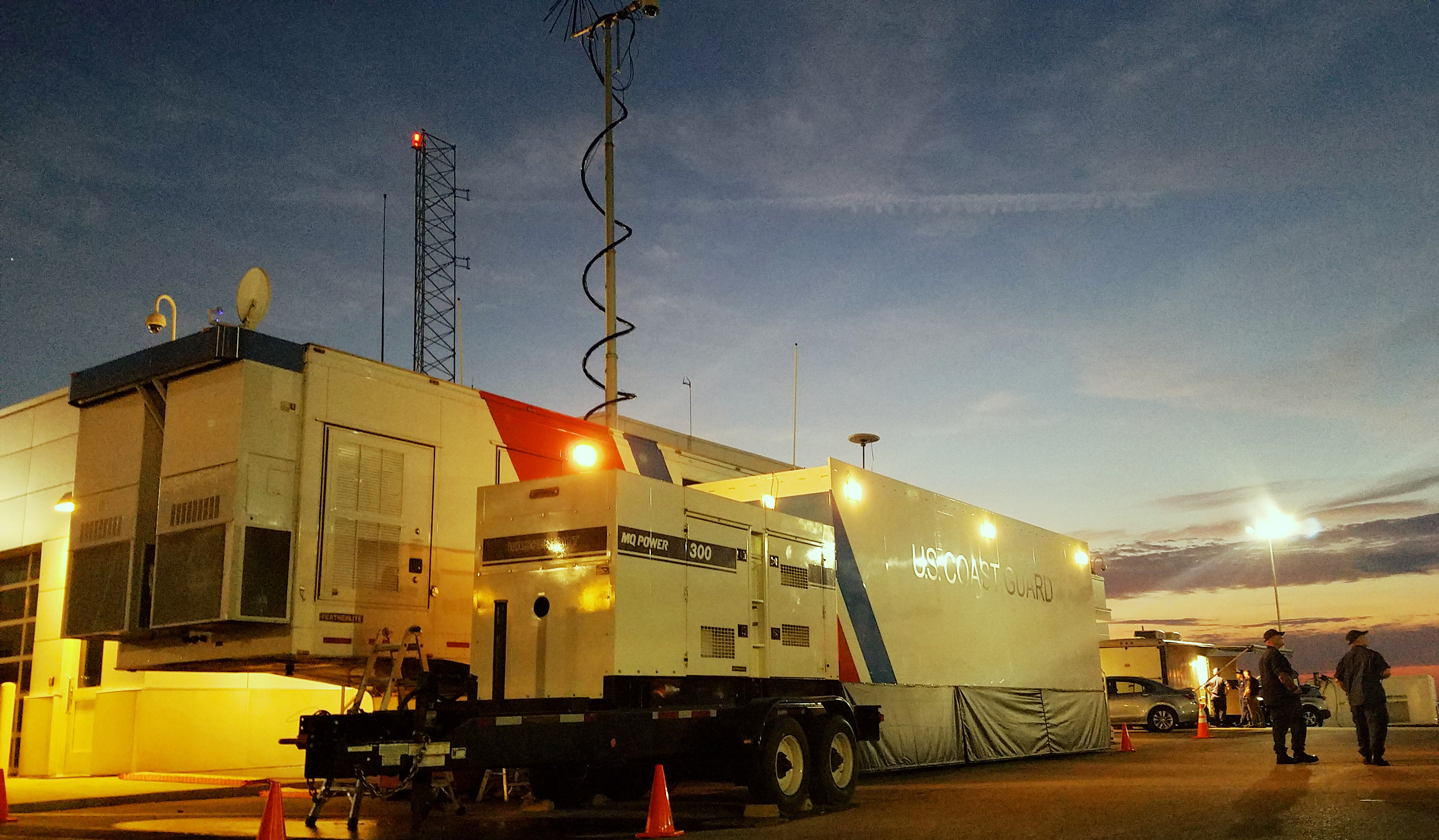
U.S. Coast Guard enhanced mobile incident command post installed in Cleveland for the convention

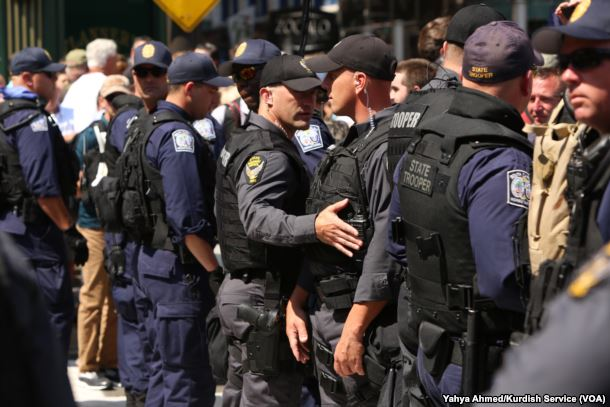
Law enforcement providing security on July 20, 2016

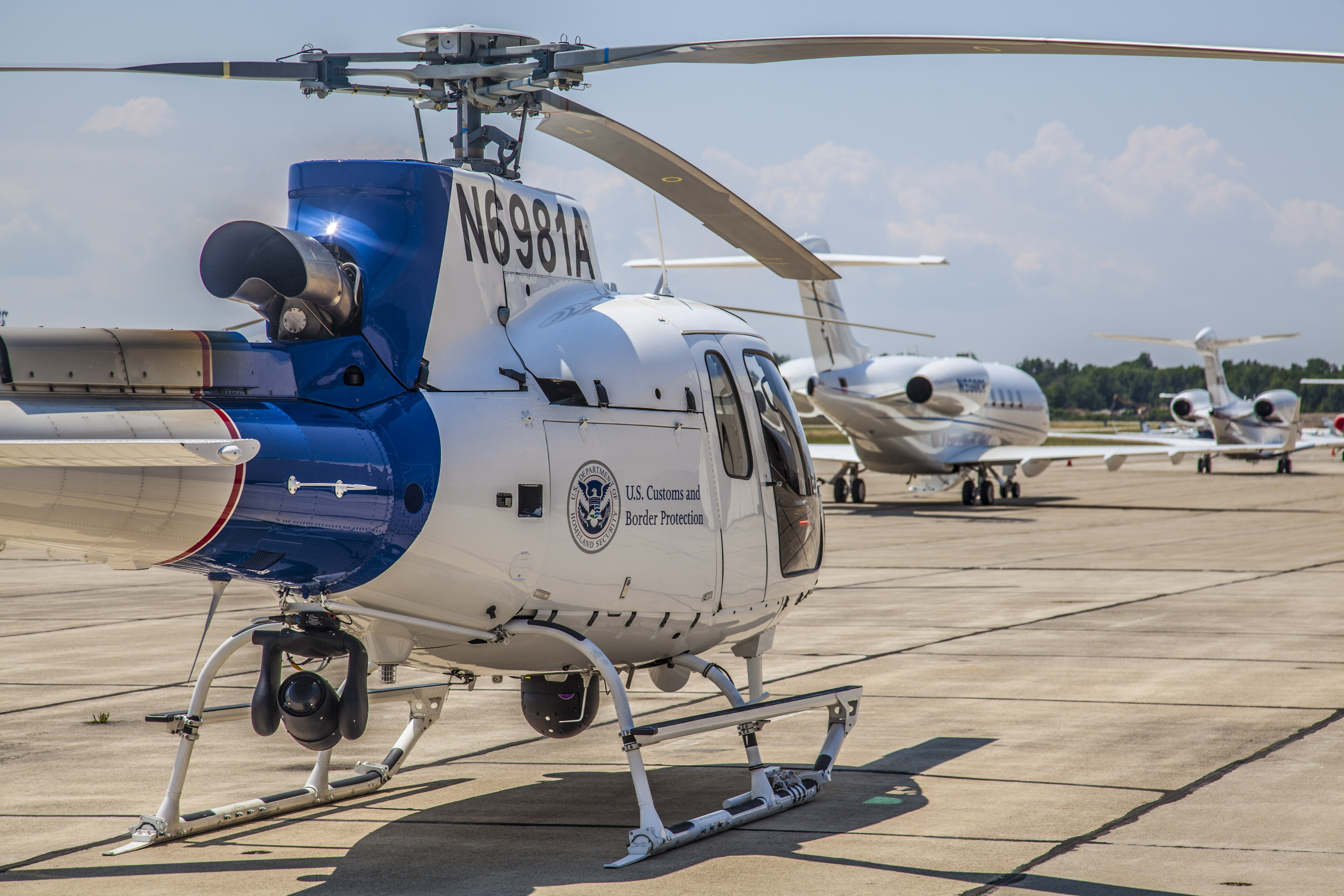
A Eurocopter AS350 Écureuil of the United States Customs and Border Protection deployed to Cleveland during the convention

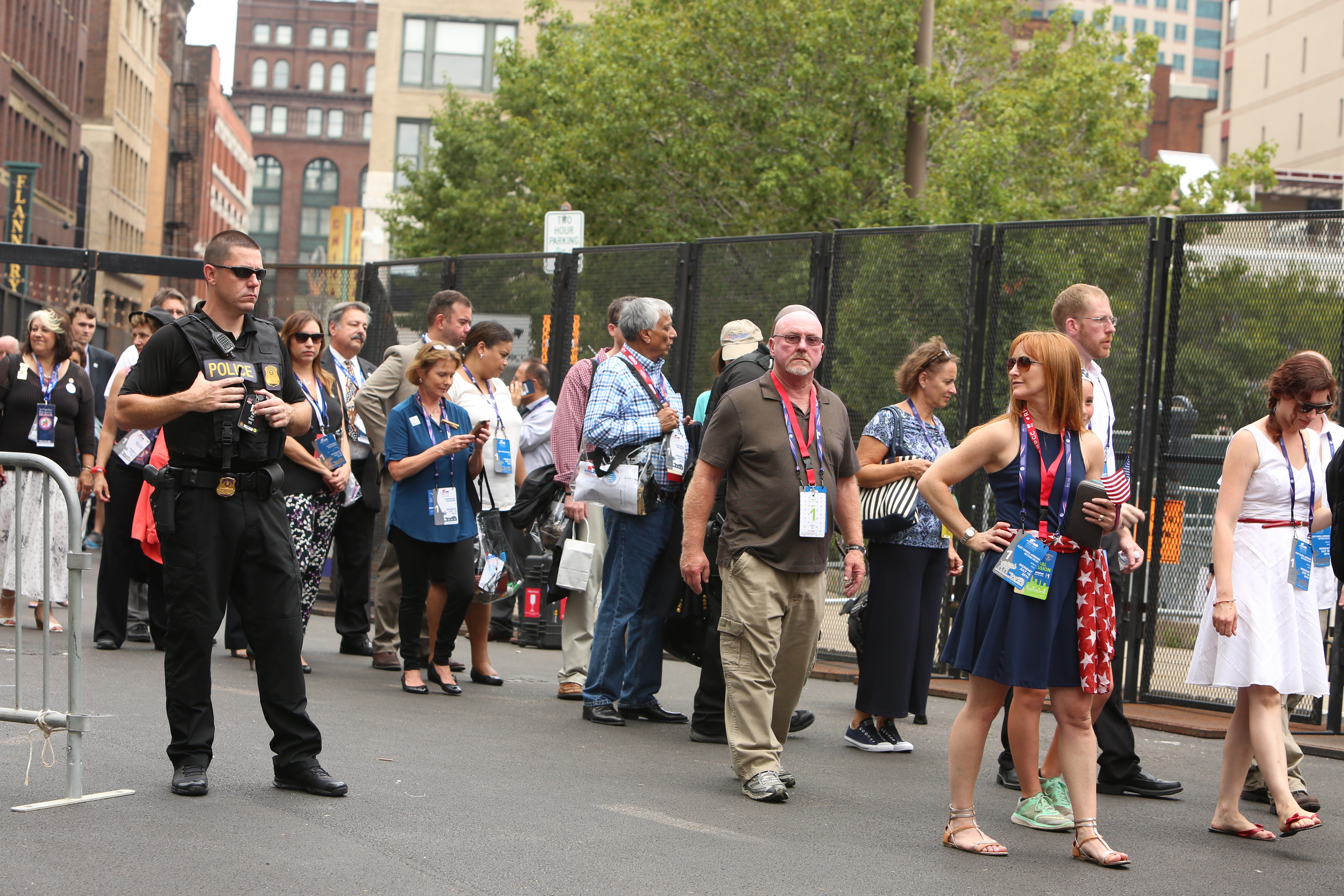
Delegates waiting in the security line to enter the convention venue

The convention is designated as a National Special Security Event, meaning that ultimate authority over law enforcement goes to the Secret Service and Department of Homeland Security. A highly publicized online petition by gun activists to allow the open carry of guns inside Quicken Loans Arena garnered 45,000 signatures; however, the Secret Service, which is in charge of convention security, announced that it would not allow guns in the arena (or the small "secure zone" immediately outside it) during the event, releasing a statement in late March 2016 saying: "Individuals determined to be carrying firearms will not be allowed past a predetermined outer perimeter checkpoint, regardless of whether they possess a ticket to the event." The Secret Service has the authority to restrict guns, firearms or other weapons from entering any site where it is protecting an individual.

The Cleveland Police Department received $50 million in federal grants to support local police operations during the event. With this grant money, the City of Cleveland sought to purchase over 2,000 riot control personnel gear sets prior to the convention for $20 million, and the remaining $30 million was planned to be used for personnel expenses. Items such as water guns, swords, tennis balls and coolers have been banned by the City of Cleveland from the 1.7-square-mile "event zone" outside the convention hall by the City of Cleveland, but because of a statewide open-carry law permitting the open carrying of guns, firearms are permitted. The Cleveland chapter of the NAACP raised concerns in March 2016 in a letter to city and county leaders about security at the convention, writing that police were unprepared for a "possible mix of protesters and demonstrators brandishing guns." The Cleveland Police Union also raised concerns similar to those raised by the local NAACP in March, writing that equipment and training for police was behind schedule. On July 16—the eve of the convention—the Cleveland Police Union asked Governor John Kasich to temporarily suspend Ohio's state open-carry gun law so as to block the carrying of guns within the event zone, but Kasich rejected the request, writing: "Ohio governors do not have the power to arbitrarily suspend federal and state constitutional rights or state laws as suggested."

Before the convention there were a number of online phishing expeditions that may have been hackers looking for weak spots in the convention's network. The computer network of the Democratic National Committee had already been penetrated by hackers linked with the Russian government, compromising, among other things, the database of opposition research on Trump. On July 17, 2016, The New York Times reported that "Cleveland has assigned about 500 police officers specifically to handle the convention and it has brought in thousands more officers to help, from departments as distant as California and Texas."

=== Protest planning ===
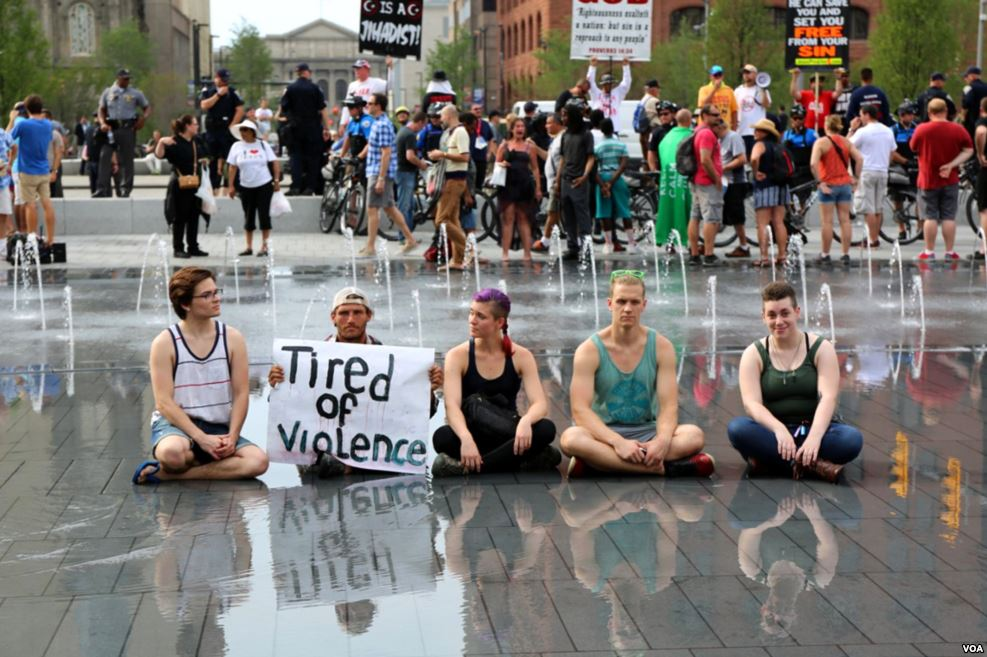
Group of protesters in Cleveland's Public Square during the convention

The Los Angeles Times wrote at the end of March 2016 that fears of a turbulent and volatile convention atmosphere were heightened because of a variety of factors: "a city scarred by controversial police shootings and simmering with racial tension; a candidate [Trump] who has threatened that his supporters will riot if he comes with the most delegates but leaves without the nomination; and a police force with a reputation for brutality." Concerns specifically focused on the ability of the Cleveland Police Department to handle protests in the wake of the Tamir Rice and Michael Brelo cases, and a 2014 Department of Justice investigation that criticized the police department for having a pattern or practice of using "unreasonable and unnecessary force." Left-wing activists have been preparing for the convention since it was announced in 2014. In May 2016, the American Civil Liberties Union threatened to file a lawsuit on behalf of two activist groups, Citizens for Trump and a progressive group called Organize Ohio, asserting that protesters were being inhibited in their attempts to organize effectively by the city's delay in granting permits. As of May 19, six groups had filed for permits, but none had been granted. Cleveland stalled on approving and making public the demonstration applications it received, while Philadelphia (hosting the 2016 Democratic National Convention) had already granted an application. The ACLU sued the city in federal district court on June 14, 2016. As of May 20, 2016, groups that have filed for protest permits have included the AIDS Healthcare Foundation; Global Zero; Organize Ohio, a group of progressive activists; the Citizens for Trump/Our Votes Matter March; Coalition to March on the RNC and Dump Trump; Stand Together Against Trump, an anti-Donald Trump group; People's Fightback Center/March Against Racism; and Created Equal, an anti-abortion group. A pro-Trump group, Trump March RNC, withdrew its application after Trump became the presumptive nominee.

=== Attendance and officials skipping convention ===
As Trump rose to become the presumptive presidential nominee of the Republican Party, a number of prominent Republicans announced they would not attend the convention. Of the living former Republican nominees for president, only 1996 nominee Bob Dole announced that he would attend the convention; Romney, John McCain, George W. Bush and George H. W. Bush all announced that they would skip the convention. A number of Republican governors, U.S. representatives and U.S. senators, particularly those facing difficult reelection campaigns, also indicated that they would not attend, seeking to distance themselves from Trump and spend more time with voters in their home states. Most notably, Governor Kasich chose to avoid the convention, while Ohio Senator Rob Portman attended the convention but avoided taking a major role in its proceedings. On July 8, 2016, Nebraska Senator Ben Sasse announced that he would not attend the convention. Many Republican senators did not attend the convention at all: Senator Steve Daines of Montana, who would be "fly-fishing with his wife"; Senator Jeff Flake of Arizona, who said he had "to mow his lawn"; and Senator Lisa Murkowski of Alaska, who would be traveling in Alaska by bush plane.

A number of prominent businesses and trade groups, including Coca-Cola, Microsoft and Hewlett-Packard, scaled back participation in the convention, sharply reducing their contributions for convention events and sponsorship. In June, six major companies that sponsored the 2012 Republican convention—Wells Fargo, UPS, Motorola, JPMorgan Chase, Ford and Walgreens Boots—announced they would not sponsor the 2016 Republican convention. Apple Inc. followed suit, announcing that it, too, would be withdrawing funding from the convention over Trump's position on certain election issues.

=== Seating assignments ===
Seating arrangements for state and territorial delegations were announced on July 16, two days before the convention began. The Ohio and Texas delegations were assigned to the back of the convention hall, a move viewed as punishment for the delegations, as they did not back Trump in their respective primaries (Ohio and Texas voted for Kasich and Cruz, respectively).

== Convention committees and meetings before the Convention ==
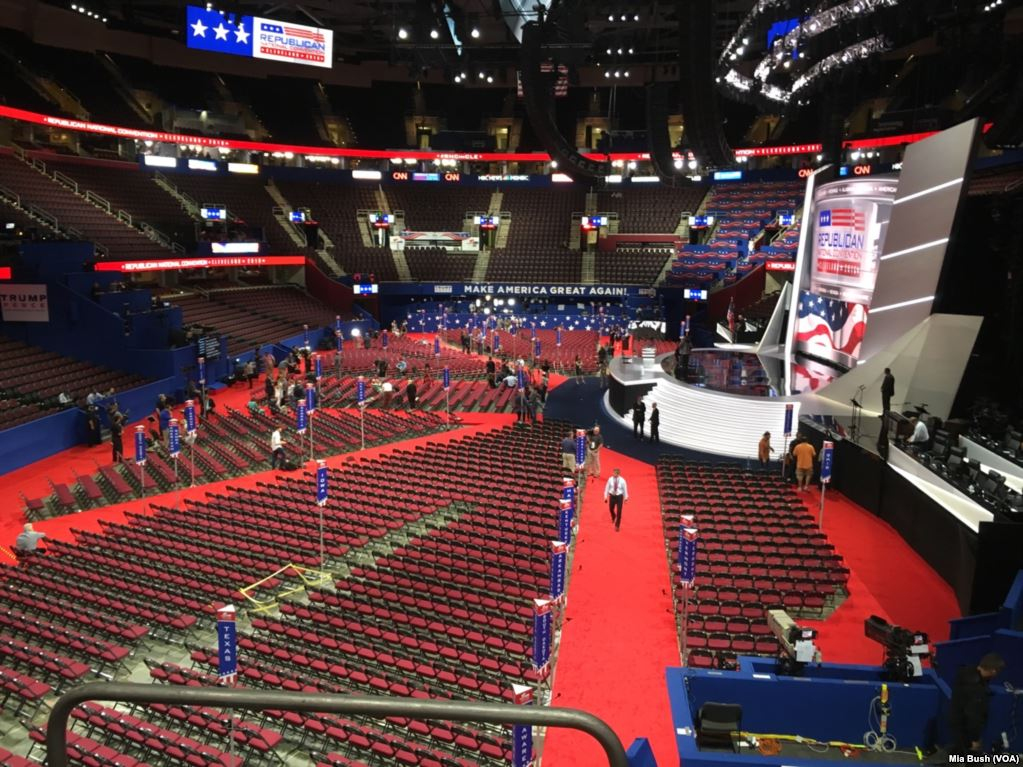
Quicken Loans Arena on the eve of the convention

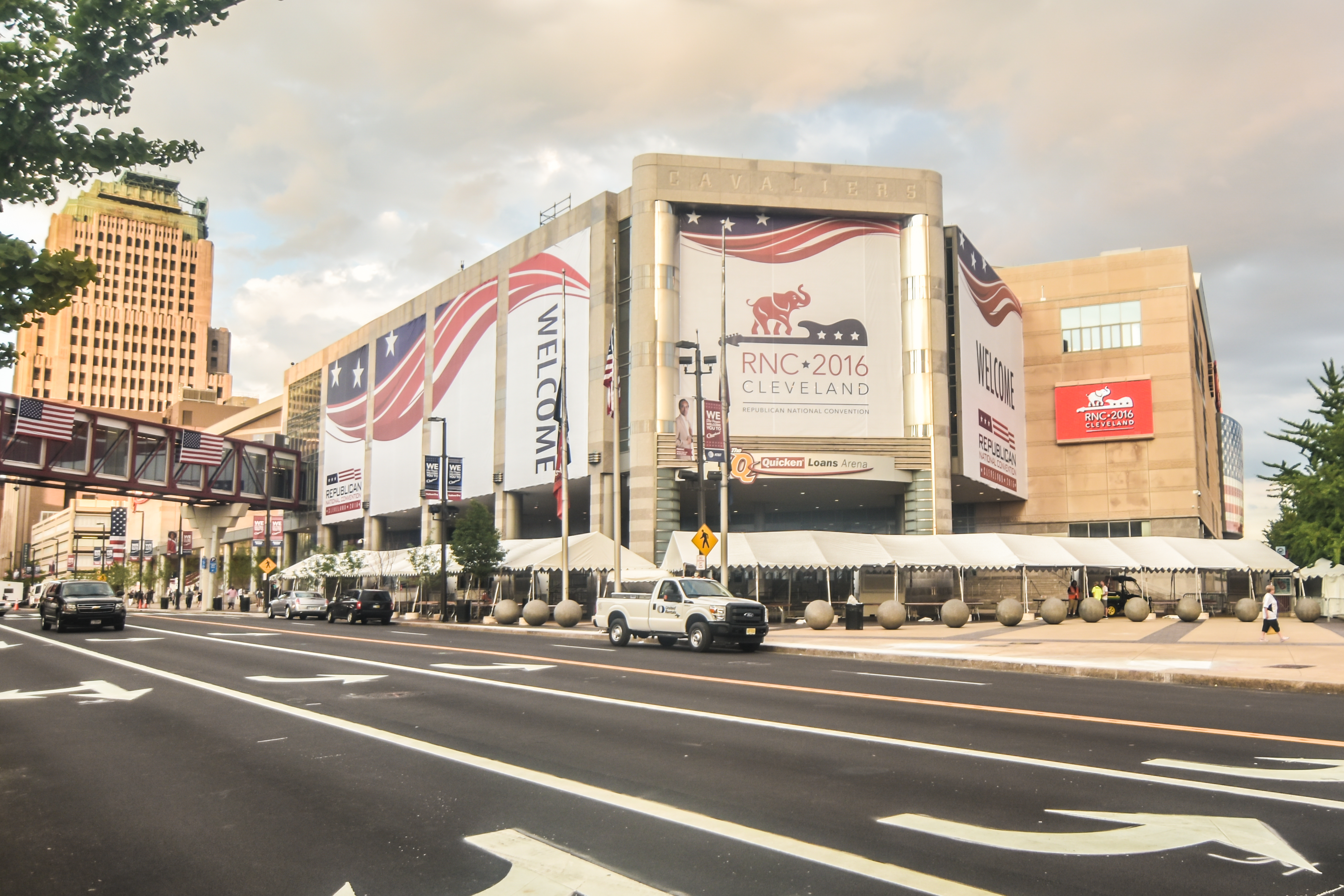
Exterior of Quicken Loans Arena several days prior to the convention

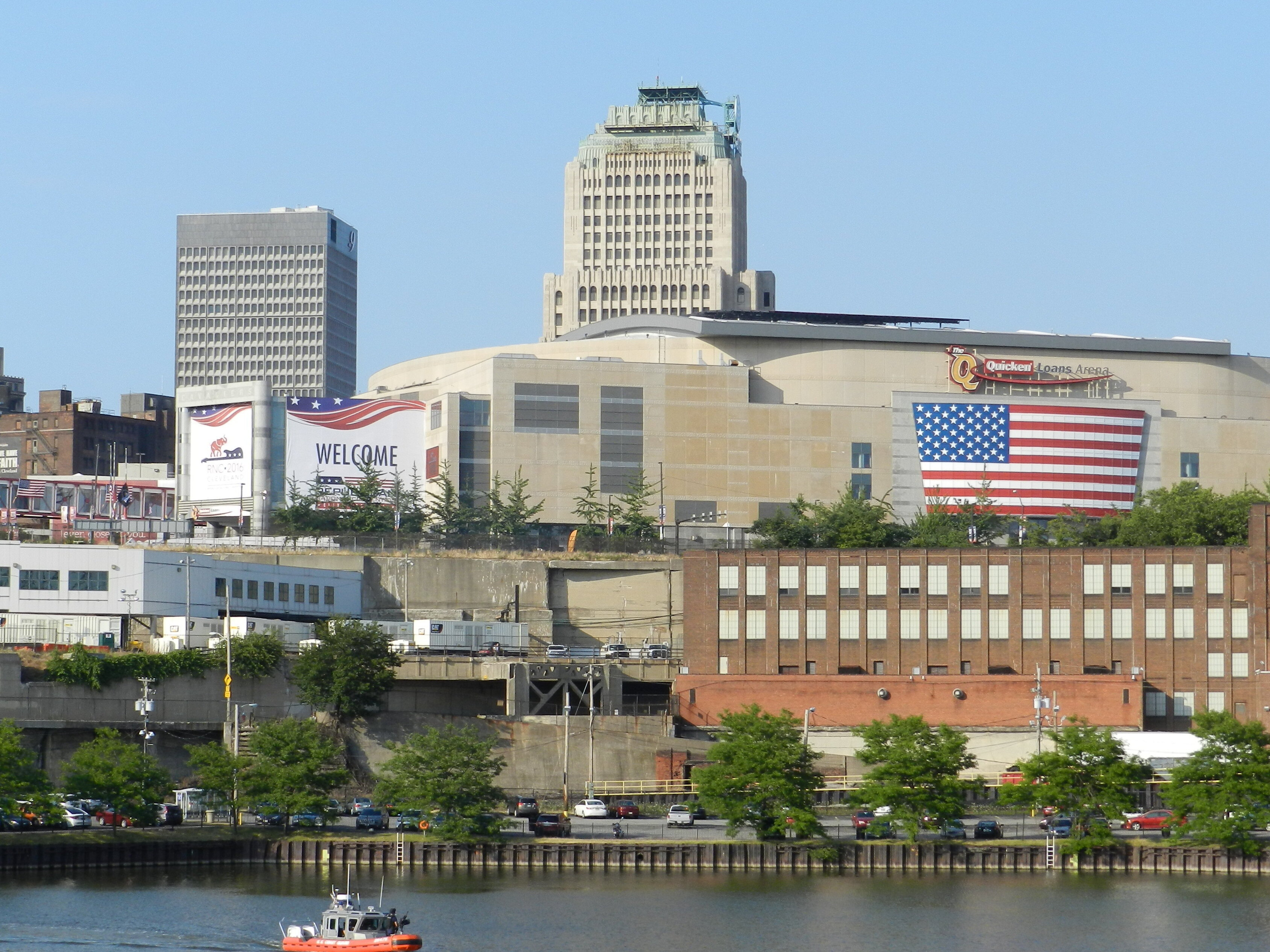
Exterior of Quicken Loans Arena on the first day of the convention (viewed from the Cuyahoga River)

There are four Convention committees, which met ahead of the convention for specific purposes under the rules of the Republican Party. Each committee is composed of one man and one woman from each state, the five U.S. territories, and the District of Columbia, totaling 112 members. Those committee members are selected by the 56 delegations, which determine on their own how to choose their representatives on each committee. Each of the committees met the week before the convention at the Huntington Convention Center in Cleveland. The committees are as follows:

=== Committee on Rules and Order of Business (or Rules Committee) ===
The Rules Committee, which sets the rules of the convention and the standing rules that govern the party until the next convention, met on July 14. The rules it passes must be adopted by the full convention to take effect. This committee is regarded as the most powerful. It consists of 112 members, including one male delegate and one female delegate from each state, territory and Washington, D.C. Members of this committee are elected at state conventions. The Rules Committee was chaired by Enid Mickelsen of Utah and Ron Kaufman of Massachusetts.

In June 2016, activists Eric O'Keefe and Dane Waters formed a group called Delegates Unbound, which CNN described as "an effort to convince delegates that they have the authority and the ability to vote for whomever they want." Republican delegate Kendal Unruh led an effort among other Republican delegates to change the convention rules "to include a 'conscience clause' that would allow delegates bound to Trump to vote against him, even on the first ballot at the July convention." Following a "marathon 15-hour meeting" on July 14, 2016, the Rules Committee voted down, by a vote of 84–21, a move to send a "minority report" to the floor allowing the unbinding of delegates, thereby guaranteeing Trump's nomination. The committee then made the opposite move, voting 87–12 to include rules language specifically stating that delegates were required to vote based on their states' primary and caucus results. By a unanimous vote, the Rules Committee also voted to change Rule 40(b), a controversial rule that had provided that "a candidate had to win a majority of the vote in eight states to have his or her name placed into nomination at the convention." The committee voted to return to the pre-2012 rule, which required a candidate to receive only a plurality of the vote in at least five states to have his or her name placed in nomination.

=== Platform Committee ===
The Platform Committee met for two days of open hearings on July 11 and 12 to draft a party platform, which had to be ratified by the full convention. (See Platform below). The Platform Committee was chaired by Senator John Barrasso of Wyoming and co-chaired by Congresswoman Virginia Foxx of North Carolina and Governor Mary Fallin of Oklahoma.

=== Credentials Committee ===
The Credentials Committee handles disputes on the eligibility of convention delegates. The Committee on Contests reviews contested delegates; if the Contests Committee recommends that a delegate be de-certified, the Credentials Committee considers the recommendation. The Rule Committee was chaired by Mike Duncan, former chairman of the Republican National Committee, and co-chaired by Arkansas Republican Party chairman Doyle Webb.

=== Committee on Arrangements ===
The Committee on Arrangements handles the scheduling and logistics of the convention. The committee was chaired by Steve King, former chairman of the Republican Party of Wisconsin.

== Platform ==
=== Platform Committee debate and provisions ===
On July 12, 2016, the Republican Platform Committee completed work on a draft of the party's 2016 platform. The draft platform was described as "very conservative" and reflective of the party's move towards the right.

On domestic policy, the draft platform opposed abortion without exceptions. The platform committee adopted a provision, proposed by Kansas secretary of state Kris Kobach, expressing opposition to any restriction on magazine capacity in firearms. The platform called for "certain federally controlled public lands" to be immediately transferred to state ownership where they could be privatized. The platform did not specify whether the lands would include national parks, national forests, or wilderness areas. The platform called internet pornography "a public health crisis that is destroying the life of millions" and encouraged states to fight it. The platform also called for the teaching of the Bible in public schools.

On foreign policy, the members of the platform committee were split between "libertarian-minded isolationists" and "national security hawks." The latter camp won on almost every point, voting down measures that would have condemned ongoing U.S. involvement in Middle Eastern wars and approving language promoting increased military spending. One plank reflected a more isolationist approach, eliminating references to giving weapons to Ukraine in its fight with Russia and rebel forces; the removal of this language reportedly resulted from intervention from staffers to presumptive Republican presidential nominee Donald Trump. The draft platform opposed a two-state solution to the Israeli–Palestinian conflict. While the 2012 Republican platform called for passage of the Trans-Pacific Partnership (TPP), the draft 2016 platform did not mention the agreement; this omission reflected the influence of Trump, who opposed the trade pact. The draft platform expressly echoed Trump's call for a wall to be built on the U.S.-Mexico border.

The most contentious discussions held by the platform committee were discussions of social issues, particularly issues of sexuality and gender. The draft platform took a traditionalist view on social issues, criticizing "how the modern American family has evolved". Many platform planks expressing "disapproval of homosexuality, same-sex marriage or transgender rights"—championed by Tony Perkins, the president of the Family Research Council—passed. The draft platform called for overturning Obergefell v. Hodges, the Supreme Court decision on same-sex marriage, by a constitutional amendment. The platform also called for the appointment of judges "who respect traditional family values". The draft platform promoted state legislation to limit restroom access to persons of the same biological sex. It also stated that "natural marriage" is between a man and a woman, asserting that such unions are best for children. The draft platform also expressed support for allowing parents to seek "the proper medical treatment and therapy for their minor children"; this language was believed to allude to parental freedom to engage in sexual orientation change efforts with their minor children.

Rachel Hoff, a District of Columbia delegate who is the first openly gay member of a Republican platform committee, offered several pro-LGBT platform amendments. Each proposal failed. Hoff's proposal for language "stating that marriage is a fundamentally important institution and that 'there are diverse and sincerely held views on marriage' within the party" failed in an unofficial vote of 30 to 82. An amendment was also offered to recognize that gay people are targeted by ISIL; the delegates who introduced this amendment sought to signal inclusion of the gay community. The amendment was opposed by conservative delegates (such as Jim Bopp of Indiana, who termed such an amendment "identity politics") and was voted down.

=== Adoption of platform by convention ===
The 2016 Republican Party platform submitted by the Platform Committee was adopted by the Convention on July 18, 2016.

Giovanni Cicione of Rhode Island, a platform committee member, led "a dissident group of Republican delegates" who opposed the provisions of the draft platform relating to sexuality and gender and sought to replace the entire platform with a two-page "statement of principles" that avoided controversial issues like same-sex marriage. Cicione tried to force a debate and vote on the platform from the floor of the convention. Cicione's effort was unsuccessful; the delegates approved the platform by voice vote, with only a few scattered "nays" audible.

== Convention ==
"Hard count" of pledged delegates going into the convention: Donald Trump: 1441 delegates Ted Cruz: 551 delegates Marco Rubio: 174 delegates John Kasich: 162 delegates Ben Carson: 9 delegates Jeb Bush: 4 delegates Rand Paul: 1 delegate Mike Huckabee: 1 delegate Carly Fiorina: 1 delegate Uncommitted: 130 delegates

=== Floor fight over rules ===
After the Indiana primary on May 3, 2016, Donald Trump became the presumptive nominee as the lone remaining Republican candidate running for the Republican nomination. Under rules established by previous Republican conventions, most delegates were bound on the first ballot according to the results of the primaries. A simple majority of 1,237 delegates was needed to win the nomination. Entering the convention, Trump was seen as the presumptive nominee and had the support of a comfortable majority of the delegates.

Presidential nomination delegate count prior to convention
Candidate	Pledged delegates on first ballot	Delegate "soft count"
Donald Trump	1,441	1,537
Ted Cruz	551	569
Marco Rubio	173	166
John Kasich	161	164
Ben Carson	9	7
Jeb Bush	4	4
Other candidates	3	3
Uncommitted delegates	130	19
Available delegates	0	3

On the afternoon of July 18, 2016, a group of delegates sought to force a roll-call vote on the proposed convention rules package adopted by the Rules Committee. Some who demanded a roll call vote sought to change the party rules package to "unbind" delegates so that on the first ballot, delegates could "vote their conscience" and conceivably block Trump from being nominated on the first ballot; such a move would also "allow Trump opponents a platform to argue against" Trump. Others demanding a roll call vote were seeking to reform party rules to decentralize power from the RNC and make changes for the 2020 primary process.

That morning, a petition for a roll call vote was submitted with the signatures of a majority of delegates from ten states. That afternoon, the presiding officer, Rep. Steve Womack of Arkansas, did not recognize delegates clamoring for recognition over the rules package for the convention. Womack first declared the previous question was ordered by unanimous consent despite loud cries of objection. The rules were then adopted by voice vote, prompting loud cries of protest from delegates demanding recognition for a roll-call vote. Finally, Womack declared that a Reconsideration of a motion was laid upon the table by unanimous consent, again to cries of objection. With loud cries throughout the convention hall, Womack abandoned the podium for several minutes, allowing RNC and Trump whips to work the floor and collect withdrawal signatures from the petition for a roll call vote. Womack then reappeared and, again using unanimous consent, stated he would put the question of adopting the rules to the convention for a voice vote a second time. A second voice vote was taken. Womack then recognized the leader of the Utah delegation, who requested a roll call vote. Womack denied the motion, ruling that there were insufficient signatures to compel such a vote, and announcing that while there had initially appeared to be nine state delegations that agreed to the roll-call vote, enough signatures had since been withdrawn to cause three states to fall below the threshold, thus missing the required seven states needed. It was reported that Trump campaign aides and RNC staff worked on the floor to persuade delegates to withdraw their support and "challenged the validity of various signatures." Delegates, including Senator Mike Lee of Utah, sought recognition and repeatedly called for a point of order, but were ignored by Womack, and reportedly had their microphones turned off. Lee said he had "never seen anything like this" after Womack declined to recognize their objections and walked off the stage, and Ken Cuccinelli, the Virginia delegation chairman, said the RNC "cheated" and "violate[d] their own rules." The process prompted the Colorado delegation to walk out in protest.

=== Nominations and balloting ===
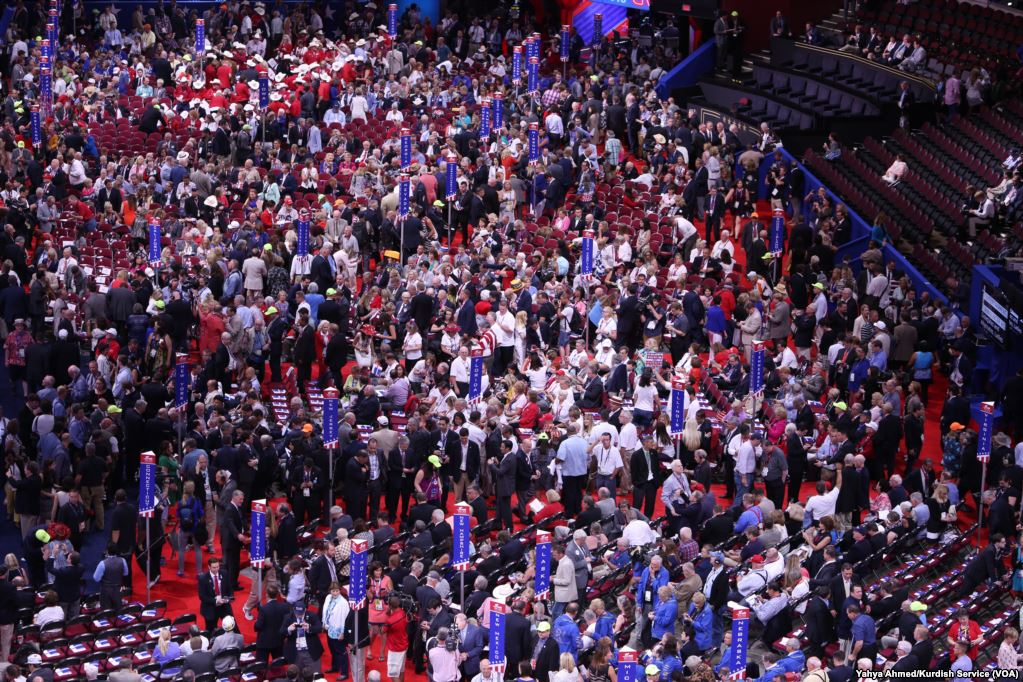
Delegates on the arena floor during the roll call vote

Jeff Sessions, U.S. senator from Alabama, formally nominated Trump for president, with Chris Collins, U.S. representative from New York, and Henry McMaster, Lieutenant Governor of South Carolina, seconding the nomination. Trump won the presidential nomination on July 19, 2016 on the first ballot with 69.8% of the delegates, the lowest percentage of delegates won by the Republican nominee since the 1976 Republican National Convention. The vice presidential nomination was held immediately after the presidential nomination. Eric Holcomb, the lieutenant governor of Indiana, nominated Indiana governor Mike Pence for vice president. Trump had announced his choice of Pence as his preferred running mate the weekend before the start of the convention. Pence won the vice presidential nomination by acclamation.

All of the delegates from Iowa, Alaska, Utah and the District of Columbia were recorded and counted for Trump, despite the fact that Trump lost all three contests, and most of the members of those delegations had voted for other candidates. The Alaska delegation challenged the award of votes to Trump by the RNC secretary and the Utah delegation booed when its delegates were awarded to Trump, but was reminded by the RNC chairman that the rules for these two states required the votes to be awarded to whichever candidate was still in the race for the RNC Nomination for President, and that Cruz, Rubio, and the other candidates that had withdrawn from the race had forfeited these delegates based on the RNC nomination rules.

Republican presidential nomination ballot
Candidates	Donald Trump	Ted Cruz	Marco Rubio	John Kasich	Ben Carson	Jeb Bush	Rand Paul	Abstain
Alabama	36	13	1	·	·	·	·	·
Alaska (Note: The delegations of Alaska, District of Columbia and Utah reported votes for other candidates, which were nonetheless recorded by the convention secretary as bound votes for Trump according to RNC rules.)	28; 11	· 12	· 5	· –	· –	· –	· –	· –
American Samoa	9	·	·	·	·	·	·	·
Arizona	58	·	·	·	·	·	·	·
Arkansas	25	15	·	·	·	·	·	·
California	172	·	·	·	·	·	·	·
Colorado	4	31	·	·	·	·	·	2
Connecticut	28	·	·	·	·	·	·	·
Delaware	16	·	·	·	·	·	·	·
Washington, D.C.	19 –	· –	· 10	· 9	· –	· –	· –	· –
Florida	99	·	·	·	·	·	·	·
Georgia	42	18	16	·	·	·	·	·
Guam	9	·	·	·	·	·	·	·
Hawaii	11	7	1	·	·	·	·	·
Idaho	12	20	·	·	·	·	·	·
Illinois	54	9	·	6	·	·	·	·
Indiana	57	·	·	·	·	·	·	·
Iowa	30	·	·	·	·	·	·	·
Kansas	9	24	6	1	·	·	·	·
Kentucky	17	15	7	7	·	·	·	·
Louisiana	31	15	·	·	·	·	·	·
Maine	9	12	·	2	·	·	·	·
Maryland	38	·	·	·	·	·	·	·
Massachusetts	22	4	8	8	·	·	·	·
Michigan	51	6	·	2	·	·	·	·
Minnesota	8	13	17	·	·	·	·	·
Mississippi	25	15	·	·	·	·	·	·
Missouri	41	11	·	·	·	·	·	·
Montana	27	·	·	·	·	·	·	·
Nebraska	36	·	·	·	·	·	·	·
Nevada	14	6	7	1	2	·	·	·
New Hampshire	11	3	2	4	·	3	·	·
New Jersey	51	·	·	·	·	·	·	·
New Mexico	24	·	·	·	·	·	·	·
New York	89	·	·	6	·	·	·	·
North Carolina	29	27	6	9	1	·	·	·
North Dakota	21	6	·	·	1	·	·	·
Northern Marianas	9	·	·	·	·	·	·	·
Ohio	·	·	·	66	·	·	·	·
Oklahoma	24	19	·	·	·	·	·	·
Oregon	23	5	·	·	·	·	·	·
Pennsylvania	70	1	·	·	·	·	·	·
Puerto Rico	·	·	23	·	·	·	·	·
Rhode Island	12	2	·	5	·	·	·	·
South Carolina	50	·	·	·	·	·	·	·
South Dakota	29	·	·	·	·	·	·	·
Tennessee	33	16	9	·	·	·	·	·
Texas	48	104	3	·	·	·	·	·
Utah	40 –	· 40	· –	· –	· –	· –	· –	· –
Vermont	13	·	·	1	·	·	2	·
Virgin Islands, U.S.	8	·	·	·	·	·	·	1
Virginia	17	8	16	5	3	·	·	·
Washington	44	·	·	·	·	·	·	·
West Virginia	34	·	·	·	·	·	·	·
Wisconsin	6	36	·	·	·	·	·	·
Wyoming	3	23	1	2	·	·	·	·
States and territories	46	7	2	1	·	·	·	·
Total delegates	1,725	484	123	125	7	3	2	3

== Convention speakers ==
=== Planning and invitations ===
In April 2016, Trump vowed to bring "some showbiz" to the convention, criticizing the party's 2012 convention in Tampa, Florida, as "the single most boring convention I've ever seen." The convention's lineup of speakers lacked "many of the party's rising stars" and rather featured some of Trump's "eclectic collection of friends, celebrities and relatives." Politico reported that Trump was directly involved in details of convention plans, seeking "to maximize the drama and spectacle" of the four-night event. A large number of prominent Republican elected officials said they were not interested in attending the convention or even speaking at it, seeking to distance themselves from Trump. The Trump campaign considered the idea of having Trump speak all four nights at the convention – a break from the traditional practice of the presidential nominee taking the stage only on the final night of the convention. Ultimately, Trump decided not to speak every night. Trump also initially stated that he would announce his vice-presidential running mate at the convention itself, rather than before the convention, with a campaign staffer saying that "announcing the vice-presidential nominee before the convention is like announcing the winner of Celebrity Apprentice before the final episode is on the air." Trump's campaign eventually announced plans to announce a running mate the week before the convention and named Mike Pence as his running mate on July 15, 2016.

A number of figures that Trump said he would invite to speak, including boxing promoter Don King, former Alaska governor Sarah Palin and New England Patriots quarterback Tom Brady, were not included in the lineup. Trump wanted King to speak at the convention and raised the issue several times, reportedly until Republican National Committee chairman Reince Priebus "firmly explained" to Trump that King should not be invited due to his past manslaughter conviction. Former Chicago Bears coach Mike Ditka, a Trump supporter, declined an invitation to speak. An early roster of speakers obtained by the media listed former NFL quarterback Tim Tebow as a speaker, but Tebow later dismissed this as a rumor and did not appear at the convention. Haskel Lookstein, a prominent Orthodox rabbi, was initially set to appear at the convention to deliver the opening prayer (having accepted an invitation to do so from Ivanka Trump, a congregant), but after hundreds of American Modern Orthodox Jews urged him to withdraw from the convention, Lookstein pulled out.

Trump sought to bar those who have not endorsed him from addressing the convention, making comments aimed at the former primary rivals who have declined to endorse him – Bush, Carly Fiorina, Lindsey Graham and George Pataki. However, both Senator Marco Rubio of Florida and Senator Ted Cruz of Texas, who ran against Trump for the Republican nomination and lost, were eventually placed on the speakers' schedule, although "neither ... paid the expected price of that spotlight by offering an explicit endorsement." Cruz met with Trump two weeks before the convention and accepted an invitation to speak. Rubio was initially not offered a speaking slot and was expected to skip the convention, but on July 17, 2016, it was confirmed that Rubio would address the convention via recorded video. Neither Rubio nor Cruz were listed as "headliner" speakers.

Governor Kasich did not enter the convention hall or speak at the convention, despite overtures from Trump allies Priebus and Newt Gingrich – who, along with Chris Christie, lost the running mate job to Pence – and top Trump campaign advisor Paul Manafort. Kasich said: "If I'm going to show up at the convention and I'm not going to be saying all these great things about the host, then I think it's inappropriate. I don't think that's the right thing to do." Kasich attended events outside the convention hall in support of down-ballot Republican candidates. As the convention began, the Trump campaign lashed out at Kasich for his failure to endorse, prompting an exchange that The New York Times called "remarkably bitter" and "the latest extraordinary turn in a campaign that has veered sharply away from political precedent." Manafort called Kasich "petulant" and accused him of "embarrassing his party," prompting Kasich chief political aide John Weaver to mock Trump and criticize Manafort for his work on behalf of foreign "thugs and autocrats" abroad.

=== Schedule ===
On July 17, 2016, the convention planners released the convention's official schedule of events and speakers, along with themes. (An early, preliminary roster of speakers, "confirmed by two people with direct knowledge of the convention planning," had been obtained and published by the New York Times several days earlier.) The schedule of speakers is as follows:

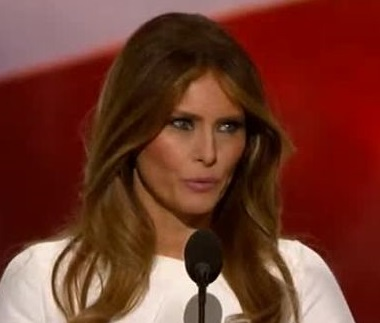
Melania Trump, wife of Donald Trump, speaking on the first night

- Monday, July 18–"Make America Safe Again"

Speaker	Position/Notability	Ref.
Mark Burns	Preacher	
Willie Robertson	TV Personality	
Scott Baio	Actor and Producer	
Rick Perry	47th Governor of Texas	
Marcus Luttrell	Retired Navy SEAL	
Patricia Smith	Mother of Sean Smith	
Mark Geist John Tiegen	U.S. Marine Corps veterans	
Kent Terry Kelly Terry-Willis	Siblings of Brian Terry	
Antonio Sabato Jr.	Actor and Model	
Mary Ann Mendoza Sabine Durden Jamiel Shaw	Parents of sons killed by an illegal immigrant	
Michael McCaul	U.S. Congressman from Texas's 10th District Chair of the House Homeland Security Committee	
David Clarke Jr.	64th Sheriff of Milwaukee County	
Sean Duffy	U.S. Congressman from Wisconsin's 7th District	
Rachel Campos-Duffy	TV Personality	
Darryl Glenn	Member of the El Paso County Board of Commissioners from the 1st district Republican candidate in the 2016 United States Senate election in Colorado	
Tom Cotton	United States Senator from Arkansas	
Karen Vaughn	Gold Star Mother	
Jeff Sessions	United States Senator from Alabama	
Rudy Giuliani	107th Mayor of New York City	
Melania Trump	Wife of Donald Trump speech by wife of presidential nominee	
Michael Flynn	Retired U.S. Army lieutenant general 17th Director of the Defense Intelligence Agency	
Joni Ernst	United States Senator from Iowa	
Jason Beardsley	Retired United States Army Special Forces veteran CEO of The Underground Movement	
Ryan Zinke	U.S. Congressman from Montana's at-large district	

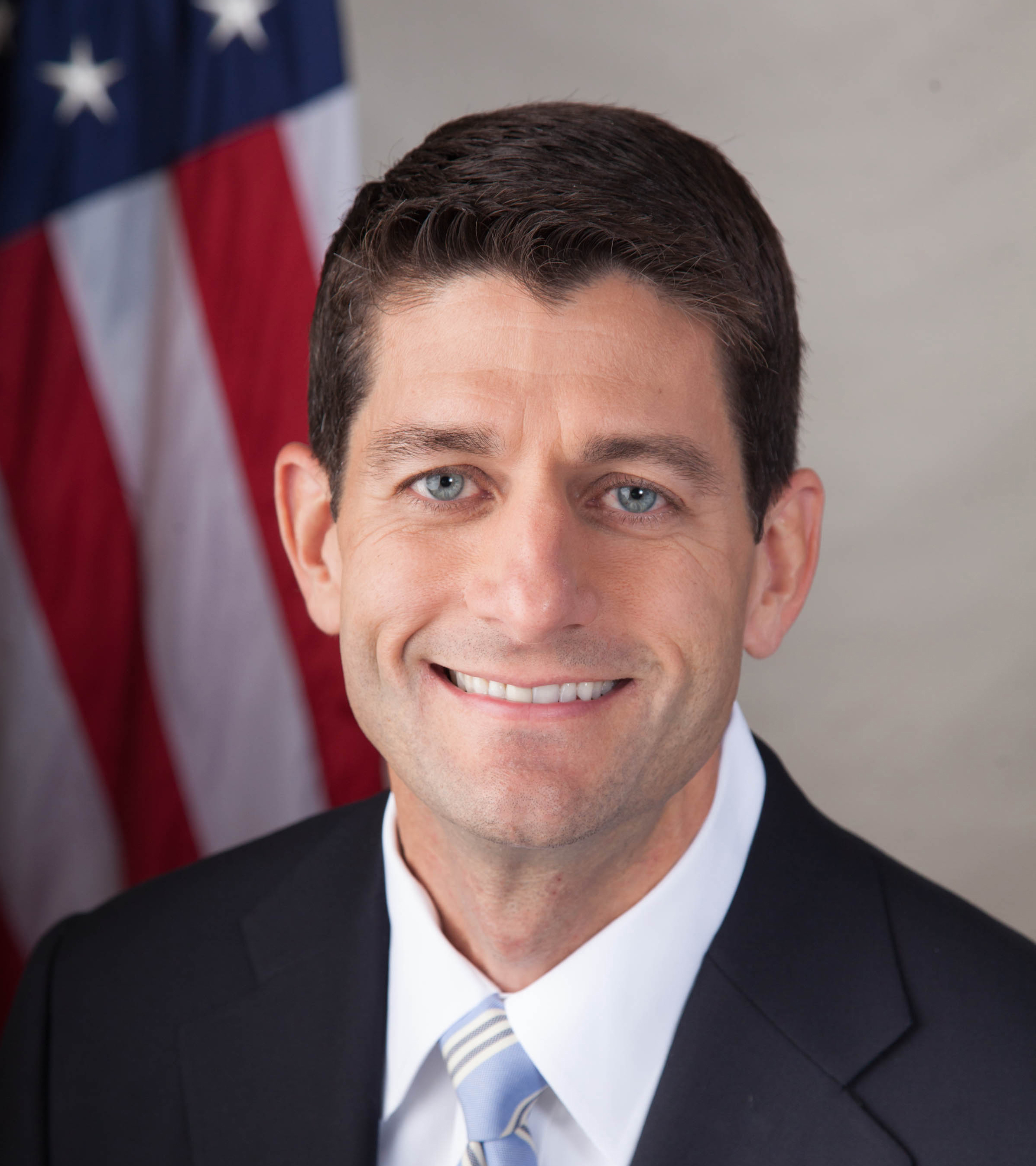
Speaker of the House Paul Ryan, the chairman of the convention, spoke on the second night.

- Tuesday, July 19–"Make America Work Again"

Speaker	Position/Notability	Ref.
Sharon Day	Co-chairwoman of the Republican National Committee	
Dana White	President of the Ultimate Fighting Championship (UFC)	
Asa Hutchinson	46th Governor of Arkansas	
Leslie Rutledge	56th Attorney General of Arkansas	
Michael Mukasey	81st United States Attorney General	
Andy Wist	Businessman	
Ron Johnson	United States Senator from Wisconsin	
Chris Cox	Lobbyist for the Institute for Legislative Action	
Natalie Gulbis	Professional golfer	
Mitch McConnell	Senate Majority Leader United States Senator from Kentucky	
Paul Ryan	54th Speaker of the United States House of Representatives Leader of the House Republican Conference U.S. Congressman from Wisconsin's 1st District Republican nominee for vice president in the 2012 Presidential Election	
Kevin McCarthy	House Majority Leader U.S. Congressman from California's 23rd district	
Chris Christie	55th Governor of New Jersey	
Tiffany Trump	Daughter of Donald Trump	
Kerry Woolard	General manager of Trump Winery	
Donald Trump Jr.	Son of Donald Trump	
Shelley Moore Capito	United States Senator from West Virginia	
Ben Carson	Retired neurosurgeon	
Kimberlin Brown	Actress	

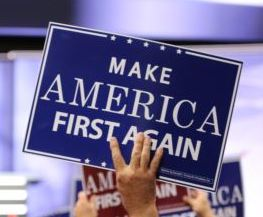
The theme of Wednesday night was "Make America First Again".

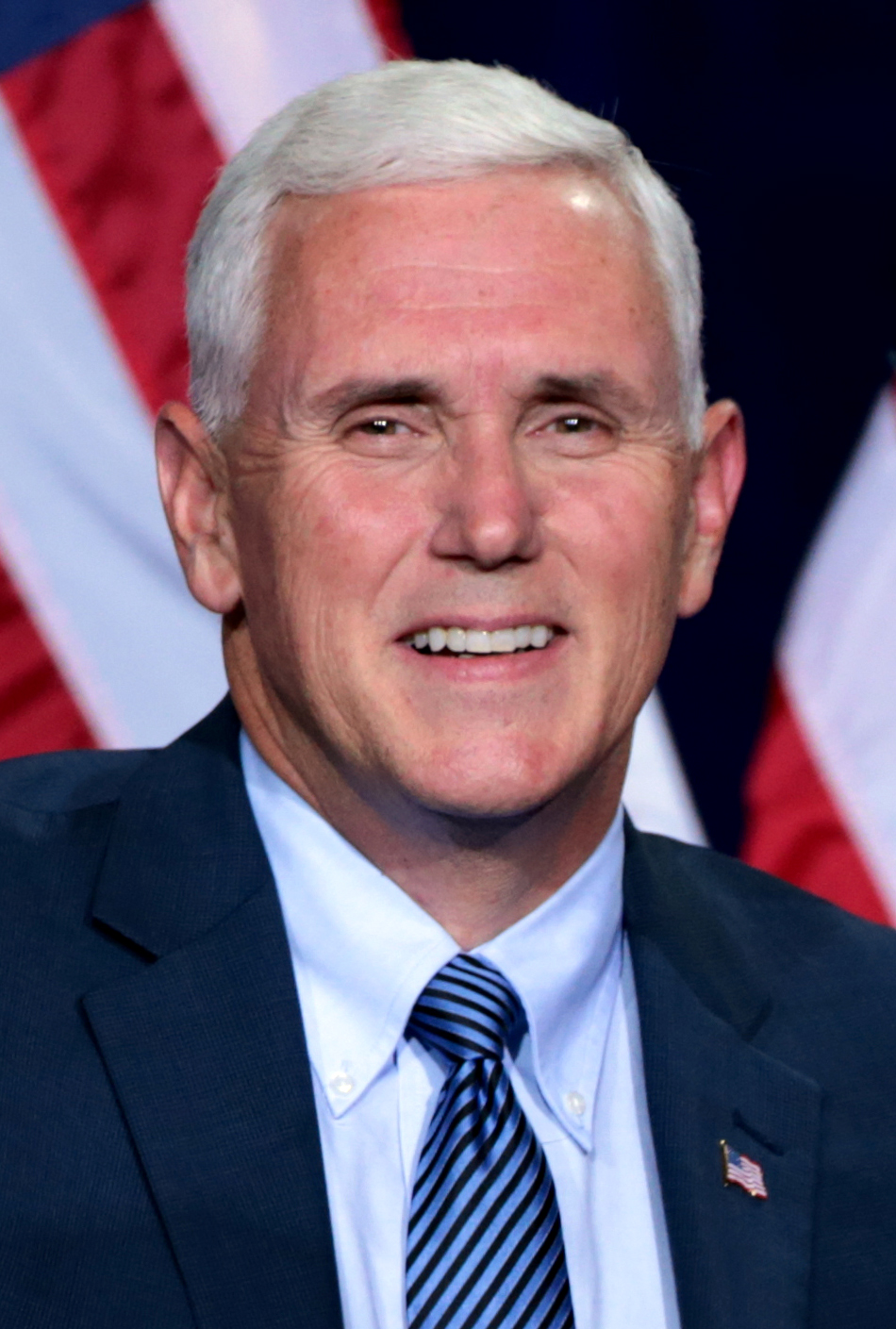
Vice presidential nominee Mike Pence gave a speech on the third night of the convention.

- Wednesday, July 20–"Make America First Again"

Speaker	Position/Notability	Ref.
Rick Scott	45th Governor of Florida	
Laura Ingraham	Radio host	
Phil Ruffin	Businessman	
Pam Bondi	37th Florida Attorney General	
Eileen Collins	Retired NASA Astronaut Retired United States Air Force colonel	
Michelle Van Etten	Businesswoman	
Ralph Alvarado	Kentucky State Senator from the 28th district	
Darrell Scott	Pastor	
Harold Hamm	CEO of Continental Resources	
Scott Walker	45th Governor of Wisconsin	
Marco Rubio	United States Senator from Florida	
Ted Cruz	United States Senator from Texas	
Lynne Patton	Event planner	
Eric Trump	Son of Donald Trump	
Newt Gingrich Callista Gingrich	50th Speaker of the United States House of Representatives Wife of Newt Gingrich	
Mike Pence	50th Governor of Indiana Republican nominee for vice president in the 2016 Presidential Election	

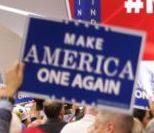
The theme of Thursday was "Make America One Again".

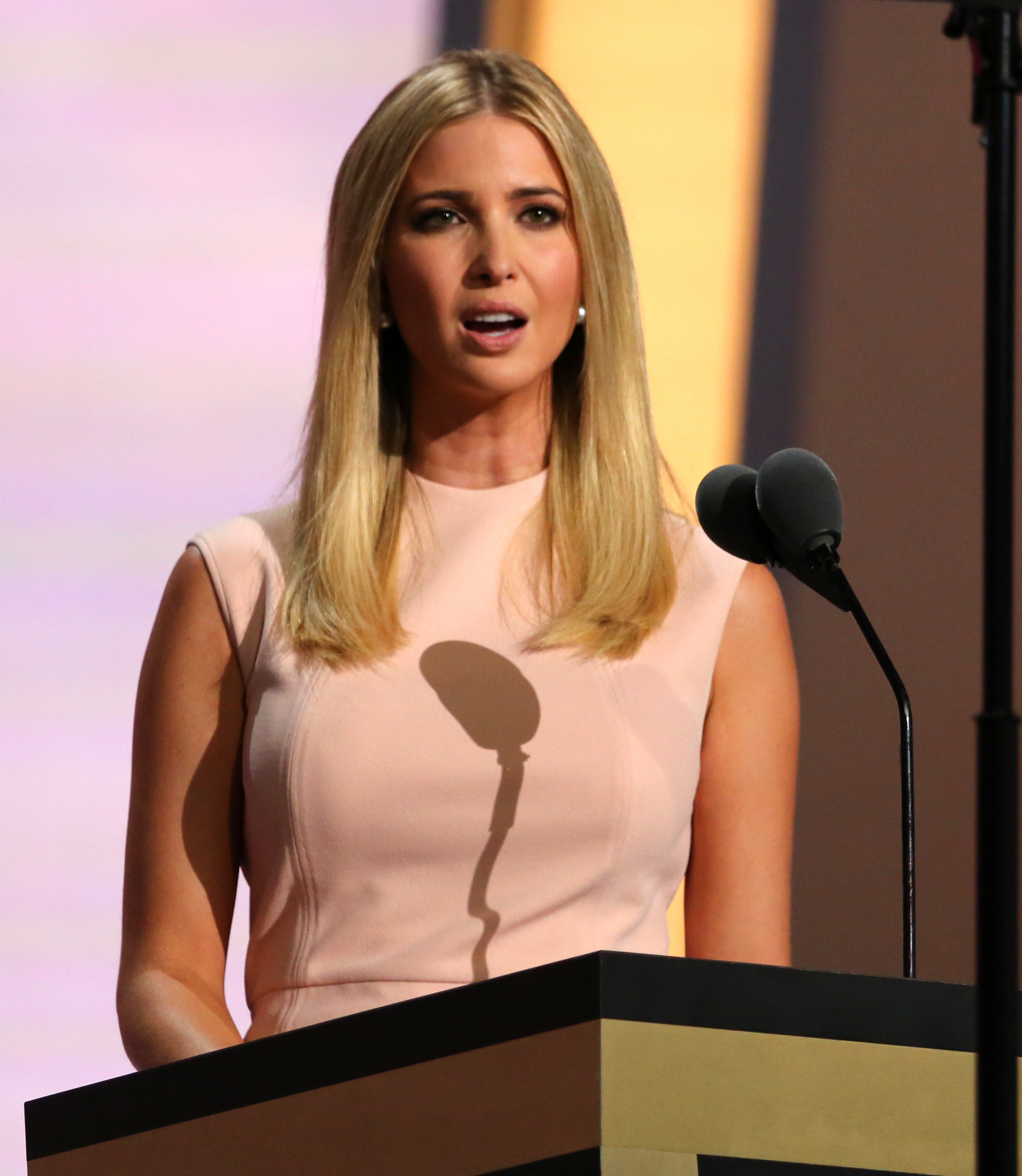
Ivanka Trump introducing her father, Donald Trump, immediately before his speech.

- Thursday, July 21–"Make America One Again"

Speaker	Notability	Ref.
Jerry Falwell Jr.	4th President of Liberty University	
Joe Arpaio	36th Sheriff of Maricopa County	
Mark Burns	Pastor	
Fran Tarkenton	Retired NFL quarterback	
Brock Mealer	Motivational Speaker	
Marsha Blackburn	U.S. Congresswoman from Tennessee's 7th District	
Mary Fallin	27th Governor of Oklahoma	
Lisa Shin	Optometrist Founder of Korean Americans for Trump RNC Delegate from New Mexico	
Reince Priebus	Chair of the Republican National Committee	
Peter Thiel	Venture Capitalist Co-founder of PayPal	
Tom Barrack	Chief Executive of Colony Capital	
Ivanka Trump	Daughter of Donald Trump	
Donald Trump	Republican nominee for president in the 2016 Presidential Election	

Of the 19 speakers billed as "headliners," six are members of the Trump family: Trump himself, his wife Melania and four of his children, Ivanka, Don Jr., Eric and Tiffany.

=== Notable speeches ===
These speeches received a significant amount of media attention.

==== Melania Trump's speech and plagiarism controversy ====
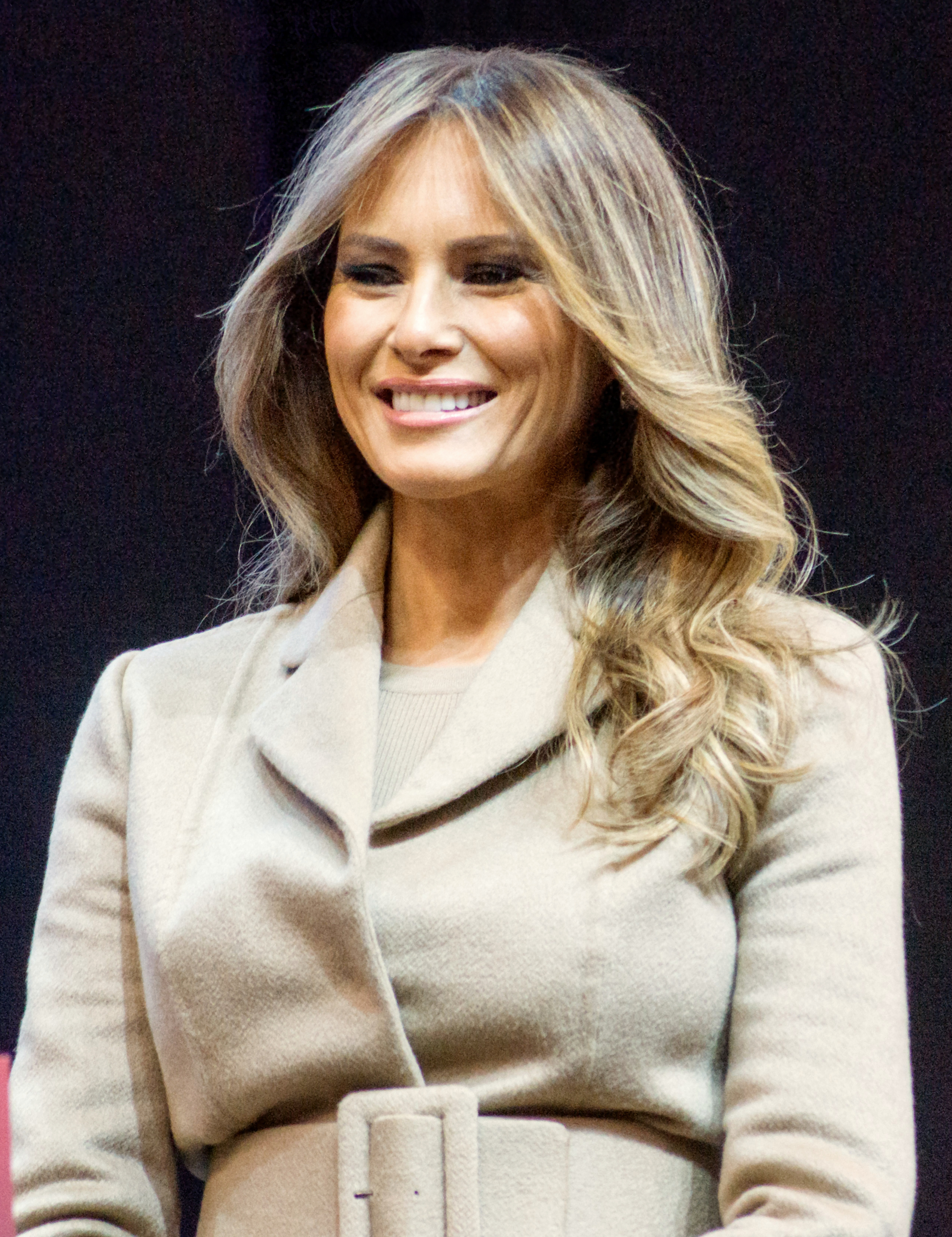

From a young age, my parents impressed on me the values that you work hard for what you want in life: that your word is your bond and you do what you say and keep your promise; that you treat people with respect."

— Melania Trump at the 2016 Republican National Convention

External videos
- "Melania Trump Remarks at Republican National Convention", July 18, 2016, C-SPAN

External image
- "Comparing Melania Trump's Speech in 2016 with Michelle Obama's in 2008", The Washington Post, July 19, 2016. Some portions of the two speeches were "very similar" and other parts were "nearly identical".

"Comparing Melania Trump's Speech in 2016 with Michelle Obama's in 2008"

Melania Trump's speech "almost immediately came under scrutiny when striking similarities were discovered between her speech" and Michelle Obama's speech at the 2008 Democratic National Convention. The Trump campaign at first denied allegations of plagiarism. Campaign manager Paul Manafort argued that the speech contained "not that many similarities" and the words used are not unique words "that belong to the Obamas."

Following Trump's speech, freelance journalist Jarrett Hill was the first to report that the speech had large similarities. Later, Chris Harrick, Vice President of Marketing at the plagiarism prevention service Turnitin, later reported that Trump used about 6% of Michelle Obama's words and found two types of plagiarism, "clone" and "find and replace". Various media outlets suggested that members of Donald Trump's presidential campaign should respond to the accusations, which they did a few hours after the speech in the form of the following statement by the campaign's senior communications advisor, Jason Miller: "In writing [the] speech, Melania's team of writers took notes on her life's inspirations, and in some instances included fragments that reflected her own thinking. Melania's immigrant experience and love for America shone through in her speech, which made it a success."

Reince Priebus, chairman of the Republican National Committee, described the speech as "inspirational" but said if plagiarism were found, he thought "it certainly seems reasonable" to fire the person who wrote the speech. Paul Manafort, Donald Trump's campaign chairman, called it a "great speech" and said "obviously Michelle Obama feels very similar sentiments toward her family". He later said "to think that she would be cribbing Michelle Obama's words is crazy", adding "This is once again an example of when a woman threatens Hillary Clinton, she seeks out to demean her and take her down. It's not going to work against Melania Trump." Sean Spicer, director of communications for the Republican National Committee, defended the speech by saying that similar statements have existed before her speech such as quotes by John Legend, Kid Rock, and Twilight Sparkle from My Little Pony: Friendship is Magic.

David Lauter of the Los Angeles Times stated that while these allegations were unlikely to cost Trump votes, the distraction is unhelpful, referring to it as a "lost opportunity" for the campaign.

On July 20, 2016, the Trump campaign issued a statement by Meredith McIver which included the following:

In working with Melania on her recent first lady speech, we discussed many people who inspired her and messages she wanted to share with the American people. A person she has always liked is Michelle Obama. Over the phone, she read me some passages from Mrs. Obama's speech as examples. I wrote them down and later included some of the phrasing in the draft that ultimately became the final speech.

On July 20, two days after Melania's speech, McIver wrote that Donald Trump declined her offer to resign.

==== Chris Christie's speech ====
In the second night of the convention, Governor Chris Christie gave a speech in a style of a mock trial. After a series of accusations against Hillary Clinton to which his audience responded "guilty", the crowd chanted "lock her up". The crowd's reaction has received widespread coverage following the speech. The "lock her up" chant was later uttered by supporters of Bernie Sanders before the 2016 Democratic National Convention. Clinton responded to the chant in an interview on 60 Minutes by saying that it saddened her.

==== Ted Cruz's speech ====
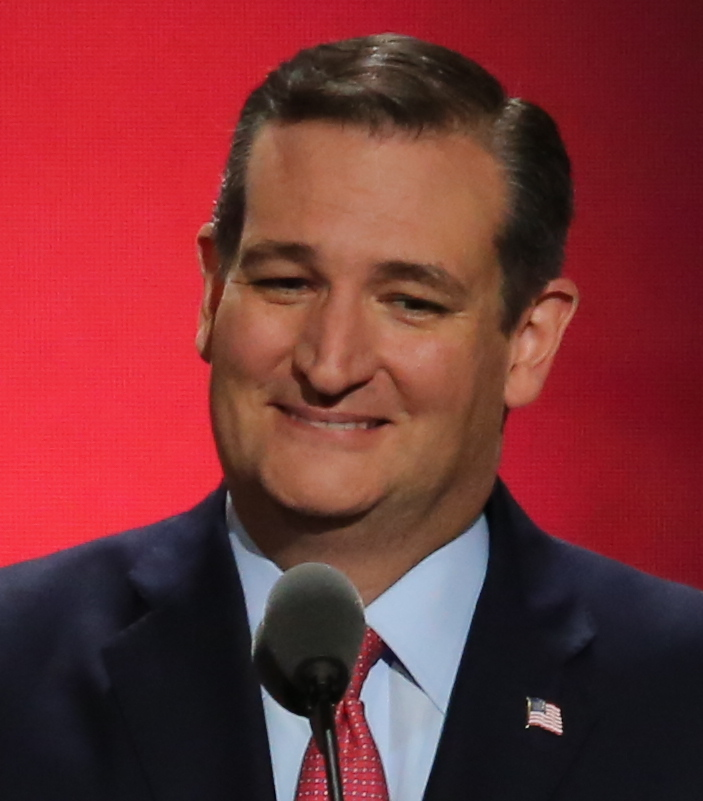

If you love our country, and love our children as much as you do, stand, and speak, and vote your conscience, vote for candidates up and down the ticket who you trust to defend our freedom, and to be faithful to the constitution."

— Ted Cruz at the 2016 Republican National Convention

In the third night of the convention, Senator Ted Cruz of Texas gave a speech in which he did not endorse Trump for president, and instead urged listeners to "vote your conscience, vote for candidates up and down the ticket who you trust to defend our freedom and to be faithful to the Constitution." Pro-Trump delegates were enraged at Cruz's speech, shouting him down and booing him off the stage, in what was described by the New York Times as "the most electric moment of the convention." Convention security personnel and Cruz advisor Ken Cuccinelli escorted Cruz's wife Heidi out of the hall, fearing for her safety. Newt Gingrich spoke after Cruz and said: "I had the text of what Ted Cruz was gonna say, and I thought it was funny," Gingrich said. "I mean, Ted gets up and he says, 'Look, vote your conscience for someone who will support the Constitution.' Well, in this particular election year, that by definition cannot be for Hillary Clinton." The following morning, Cruz attended a contentious meeting with delegates representing Texas that resulted in what CNN labeled "a remarkable 25-minute back-and-forth with his own constituents, defying appeals from his own Texas delegation to put the party above his inhibitions and back Trump."

Cruz's speech sparked a backlash and elicited negative reactions from prominent Republicans supporting Trump. New Jersey governor and former presidential candidate Chris Christie called the speech "awful" and "selfish." New York Representative Peter T. King called Cruz a "fraud" and a "self-centered liar." Senator Dan Coats of Indiana responded that Cruz was a "self-centered, narcissistic, pathological liar." Representative Marsha Blackburn of Tennessee, when asked about Cruz's speech, responded that she "would tell [Cruz] the same thing I would tell my kids, 'get over yourself.'" Susan Hutchison, chair of the Washington State Republican Party, confronted Cruz after his speech and labeled Cruz a "traitor to the party." In addition, Cruz was denied entry to influential Republican donor Sheldon Adelson's suite at the convention. Conservative radio host Rush Limbaugh speculated that Cruz was trying to mimic Ronald Reagan's speech at the 1976 Republican National Convention, in that "he wanted to deliver a speech that was Reaganesque in that the delegates would walk out of there thinking that they should have nominated him. He didn't get there." Instead, Limbaugh compared his speech to Ted Kennedy's at the 1980 Democratic National Convention, in which he failed to endorse President Jimmy Carter, the nominee, by putting his own interests ahead of the interests of the party. In the wake of Cruz's non-endorsement of Trump, his critics believed that an intraparty challenge could be possible. GOP donors and Texas politicians asked Representative Mike McCaul to run against him in the next cycle's Texas primary in 2018, before McCaul declined to run. Later, on September 23, 2016, Cruz publicly endorsed Trump for president.

==== Peter Thiel's speech ====
Instead of going to Mars, we invaded the Middle East. … It's time to end the era of stupid wars and rebuild our country. When I was a kid, the great debate was about how to defeat the Soviet Union, and we won. Now we are told that the great debate is about who gets to use which bathroom. This is a distraction from our real problems. Who cares?

— Peter Thiel at the 2016 Republican National Convention

Peter Thiel, a billionaire PayPal co-founder and Silicon Valley investor, delivered a manifesto for tackling the greater issues of the day, focusing on technology, the economy and small government. Thiel also affirmed his pride to be "gay, a Republican and most of all an American", a stance that earned him a standing ovation, chanting "USA!". It was the first time in the history of Republican National Conventions that a speaker identified himself as gay in his speech, although there have been previous speeches by gay men.

==== Donald Trump's speech ====
Donald Trump making his acceptance speech for the RNC (VOA)

Trump, having been formally nominated as the Republican presidential nominee on the second night of the convention, spoke on the fourth and final night of the convention. Trump's speech was leaked hours in advance by Correct the Record, a liberal-leaning Super PAC, though Trump had already given copies of his speech to the network press pool. Trump's daughter, Ivanka Trump, introduced Trump in a speech immediately before his own speech. "Here Comes the Sun" was used as the entrance music for Ivanka Trump. The George Harrison estate complained about the use of this song, which his family said was "offensive and against the wishes of the George Harrison estate."

Trump spoke for 75 minutes, making his speech the longest since at least the 1972 Republican National Convention and one of the longest acceptance speeches ever in major-party convention history. In his speech, Trump stated that America faces a "crisis" due to "attacks on our police" and "terrorism in our cities," and emphasized an important theme in his campaign: law and order. In evaluating the speech, Glenn Thrush of Politico noted the influence of Richard Nixon, Spiro Agnew, Ronald Reagan, and Rudy Giuliani, all of whom sounded similar themes earlier in American history in attempts to win over the "Silent Majority". Trump also promised to limit American participation in global crises and trade deals. When Trump turned to the subject of illegal immigration, many in the audience began shouting "Build the wall, build the wall," referring to a signature promise of Trump's campaign to build a wall on the Mexico–United States border. Trump also repeatedly attacked President Barack Obama and the Democratic presumptive nominee, Hillary Clinton, arguing that the country and world had become less safe during their time in office. However, Trump attempted to reach out to supporters of defeated Democratic candidate Bernie Sanders, as well as down-and-out urbanites. In his speech, Trump also became the first Republican nominee to mention the LGBT community in a GOP nomination address, saying, "As your president, I will do everything in my power to protect our LGBTQ citizens from the violence and oppression of a hateful foreign ideology." The speech was written by his advisor Stephen Miller.

===== Reception of Trump's speech =====
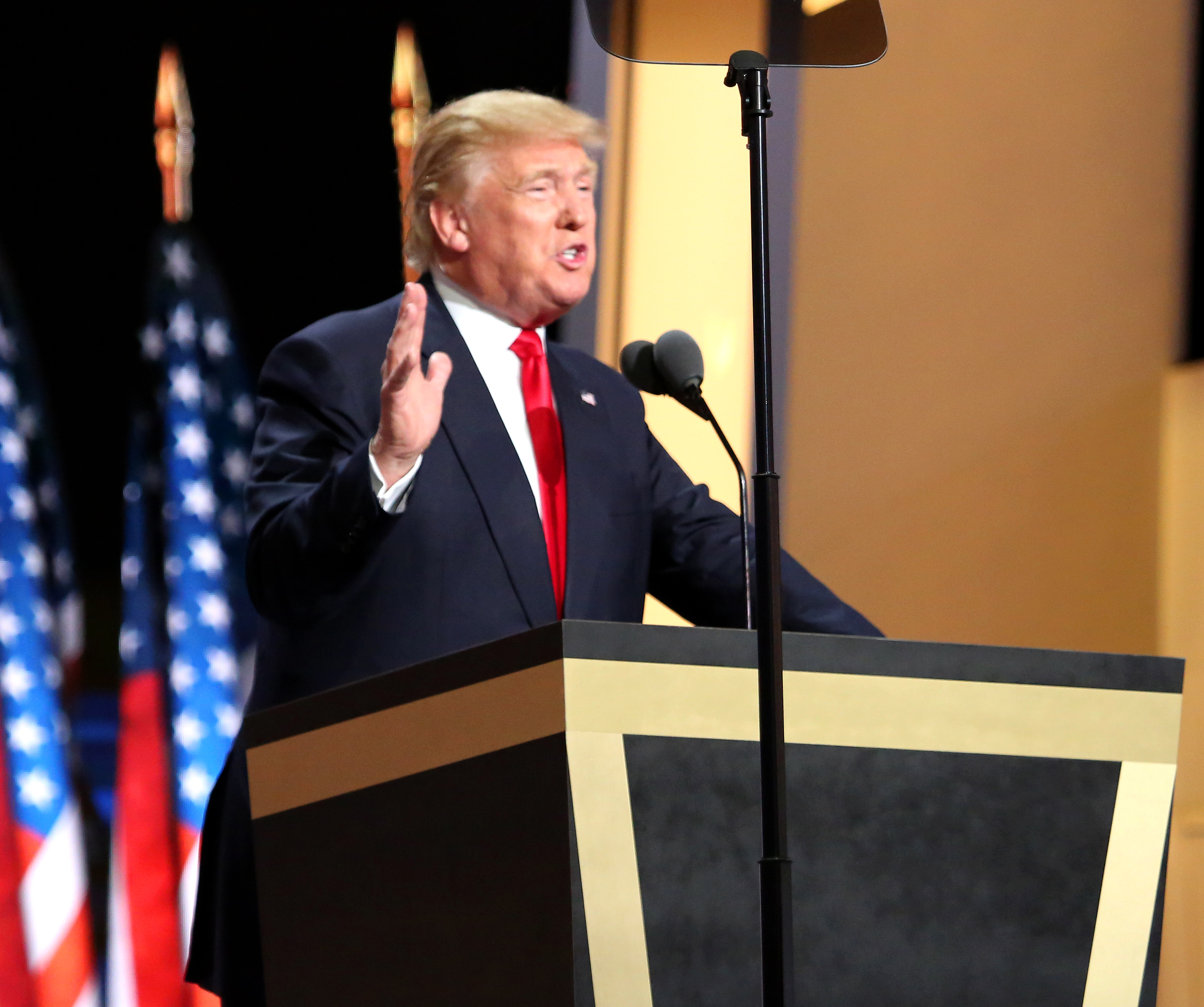
Trump making a speech on the final day of the RNC, July 2016

Philip Rucker and David Fahrenthold of The Washington Post found Trump's speech to be "relentlessly gloomy," and observed that Trump painted himself as an agent of change, while he cast Clinton as a defender of the status quo. Trump's speech was dubbed the "Mourning in America" speech. Niall Stanage of The Hill argued that Trump's speech brought stability to a turbulent convention and showed Trump at his "most comfortable and energized." A Politico poll found largely positive reactions among "GOP political insiders" while Democrats argued that Trump's "dark" speech would prove damaging. The New York Post released a cover story the next day by Michael Goodwin praising Trump's speech, declaring it "the speech of his life," and also saying that the speech "could signal the start of an American revival." Ratings figures released by the major networks showed that approximately 32 million viewers watched Trump's speech, slightly ahead of the number that watched Mitt Romney's 2012 speech.

Some LGBT advocates critiqued Trump's reference to LGBT people, on the ground that it stood in contrast to positions he had taken on LGBT issues during the campaign; activists such as Chad Griffin of the Human Rights Campaign and Rick Zbur of Equality California suggested that the statement was an attempt to turn LGBT people against Muslims and pit minority groups against each other.

A Gallup survey found that 35% of Americans saw Trump's speech positively (either "excellent" or "good"), while 36% saw it negatively. According to Gallup, the speech had "the least positive reviews of any speech we have tested after the fact." 36% of Americans said the convention made them more likely to vote for Trump, while 51% said it made them less likely to vote for him. This is the highest "less likely to vote" percentage for a candidate in the 15 times Gallup has asked this question after a convention. It is also the first time in Gallup's convention polling that a Democratic or Republican convention has made more say that they are less likely to vote for the party's nominee.

According to a CNN/ORC poll, the public rendered a split decision on whether the convention made them more or less likely to back Trump, with 42% saying more likely while 44% saying less so. 40% called the speech "excellent or good," and about half of voters (45%) said Trump's speech reflected the way they feel about things in the U.S. today. However, some negative numbers included the fact that 18% called Trump's speech "terrible," which was the highest number recorded in that category by CNN since it first started to ask the question in 1996.

According to FiveThirtyEight, poll averages suggested a post-convention bounce of 3 to 4 percentage points for Trump.

== Demonstrations ==
The number of demonstrators was significantly lower than expected and, according to Cleveland records, three of five officially permitted protests planned for the first three days of the convention did not occur. Lower-than-expected was attributed to a variety of factors, including "fear of violence from the police and fear of violence from the Trump supporters"; Cleveland's relatively small size compared to cities such as Chicago or New York; and a heavy police presence.

On July 18, the convention's first day, dueling anti-Trump and pro-Trump demonstrations took place at various places in Cleveland, attracting several hundred demonstrators each. The demonstrations were peaceful, with just two reported arrests.

On July 19, the convention's second day, peaceful protests continued. Demonstrators included those from groups such as the antiwar organization Code Pink and from the West Ohio Minutemen, a militia group. Three people were arrested for criminal mischief for climbing flag poles and hanging a banner at the Rock and Roll Hall of Fame, bringing the total number of convention-related arrests to five. A brief scuffle between supporters of pro-Trump conspiracy theorist Alex Jones and anti-Trump protesters was quickly broken up by police. On July 21, the final day of the convention, Jones and Roger Stone interrupted a broadcast of Cenk Uygur's The Young Turks, leading to a confrontation between Jones, Stone, and Uygur.

On July 20, the convention's third day, seventeen people were arrested, and two officers sustained minor injuries. The International Business Journal reported: "News reports and videos circulated on social media about the increasingly tense nature of protests that have included activists from Black Lives Matter, the Ku Klux Klan and the Westboro Baptist Church, in addition to ardent supporters for Donald Trump and Hillary Clinton."

On July 21, the final day of the convention, Donald Trump's acceptance speech was briefly interrupted by Code Pink activist Medea Benjamin.

The demonstrations were generally peaceful. Some demonstrators expressed disappointment at the low turnout. In contrast, the 2016 Democratic National Convention saw a larger turnout and more arrests than the Republican Convention.

== Viewership (10:00 to 11:45 PM Eastern) ==
=== Night 1 ===
==== Total viewers ====
Network	Viewers
FNC	6,348,000
CNN	3,943,000
NBC	3,913,000
ABC	3,643,000
CBS	2,963,000
MSNBC	1,995,000

==== Viewers 25 to 54 ====
Network	Viewers
NBC	1,637,000
FNC	1,600,000
CNN	1,373,000
ABC	1,254,000
CBS	785,000
MSNBC	503,000

=== Night 2 ===
==== Total viewers ====
Network	Viewers
FNC	5,262,000
NBC	4,682,000
CNN	3,064,000
CBS	2,537,000
ABC	2,329,000
MSNBC	1,533,000

==== Viewers 25 to 54 ====
Network	Viewers
NBC	1,563,000
FNC	1,165,000
CNN	944,000
CBS	792,000
ABC	749,000
MSNBC	467,000

=== Night 3 ===
==== Total viewers ====
Network	Viewers
FNC	7,337,000
NBC	5,071,000
CNN	3,504,000
CBS	2,590,000
ABC	2,326,000
MSNBC	1,980,000

==== Viewers 25 to 54 ====
Network	Viewers
NBC	1,774,000
FNC	1,724,000
CNN	1,061,000
ABC	804,000
CBS	733,000
MSNBC	555,000

=== Night 4 ===
==== Total viewers ====
Network	Viewers
FNC	9,353,000
CNN	5,476,000
NBC	4,587,000
ABC	3,861,000
CBS	3,809,000
MSNBC	2,953,000

==== Viewers 25 to 54 ====
Network	Viewers
FNC	2,483,000
CNN	1,901,000
NBC	1,766,000
ABC	1,431,000
CBS	1,208,000
MSNBC	927,000

== See also ==
- 2016 Constitution Party National Convention
- 2016 Democratic National Convention
- 2016 Libertarian National Convention
- 2016 Green National Convention
- 2016 United States presidential election
- Republican National Convention
- 2016 Republican Party presidential candidates
- 2016 Republican Party presidential primaries
- 2016 Democratic Party presidential candidates
- 2016 Democratic Party presidential primaries
- United States presidential nominating convention
- History of the United States Republican Party
- List of Republican National Conventions
- Donald Trump 2016 presidential campaign
- Mueller Report
- Timeline of Russian interference in the 2016 United States elections
- Timeline of Russian interference in the 2016 United States elections (July 2016 – election day)

Preceded by 2012; Tampa, Florida	Republican National Conventions	Succeeded by 2020; Charlotte, North Carolina and other locations
