= Curly Haugland =

American politician and businessman

- Born: Erling George Haugland
- Occupation: Businessman
- Known for: Republican National Committeeman for North Dakota; Member of RNC Rules Committee

Erling George Haugland, known as Curly Haugland, is an American politician and businessman. He has served as the Republican National Committeeman for North Dakota since 1999. Haugland was elected chairman of the North Dakota Republican Party in 1999; he served one term and has since been elected to three four-year terms as committeeman.

Since 2009 Haugland has been a member of the RNC Rules Committee. He previously served as an advisory board member for the Bank of North Dakota (1993–2000) and as Commissioner of the Northern Great Plains Rural Development Commission (1994–1996).

== 2008 campaign for chairman of the Republican National Committee ==
In 2008 Haugland set up an unsuccessful run for chairman of the Republican National Committee, in part because he was against a proposal that would allow an outsider to hold the position. Haugland was one of a group of RNC members who fought then-U.S. President George W. Bush’s move to install U.S. Senator Mel Martinez as the RNC chairman. Some members of the committee disliked what they said was Martinez's lenient stance on illegal immigration. Haugland argued that the committee's rules barred Martinez from serving as chairman because he was not one of its 168 members. The dispute ended in a compromise with Kentucky banker Mike Duncan elected chairman, and Martinez given the title of "general chairman," a position not replaced when Martinez stepped down after only ten months in October 2007.

== 2016 Republican Party presidential primary election ==
As a member of the Republican Party's Rules Committee, throughout the party's 2016 presidential nominating process, Haugland has explained that it is the party's delegates, and not primary voters, who ultimately decide the party's nominee. Haugland explained: "The media has created the perception that the voters will decide the nomination...Political parties choose their nominee, not the general public, contrary to popular belief."

In an April 2016 interview on NPR, Haugland said primary votes were irrelevant to a party's nomination process since the nomination for president is dependent solely on a simple majority of the vote of the permanently seated delegates to the national convention.

In May 2016 Politico described Haugland as "the mainstream GOP’s last hope to deny Donald Trump the Republican nomination in Cleveland."

In June 2016 Haugland and Sean Parnell co-authored a book, Unbound: The Conscience of a Republican Delegate. The book, published by Delegates Unbound, argues that "delegates are not bound to vote for any particular candidate based on primary and caucus results, state party rules, or even state law."
