= Delegates Unbound =

American political organization established 2016

- Founder: Eric O'Keefe, Dane Waters
- Type: 501(c)(4) non-profit organization
- Methods: Education, book publication, television advertising

Delegates Unbound is an American non-profit political organization established in 2016. According to the organization, the group is "working to bring long term reform to the Republican Party."

== Purpose ==
The group states that its "primary focus" is educating delegates to the 2016 Republican National Convention "that they are unbound and free to vote as they see fit on all matters before the Republican National Convention, including whomever they wish to be the Republican nominee for President" in the 2016 presidential election.

== Overview ==
In June 2016, activists Eric O'Keefe and Dane Waters formed Delegates Unbound, which CNN described as "an effort to convince delegates that they have the authority and the ability to vote for whomever they want." The group is a 501(c)(4) non-profit organization.

Delegates Unbound published a book, Unbound: The Conscience of a Republican Delegate, written by Republican delegates Curly Haugland and Sean Parnell. The book, funded by the Citizens in Charge Foundation, argues that "delegates are not bound to vote for any particular candidate based on primary and caucus results, state party rules, or even state law."

According to the group, "There is no language supporting binding in the temporary rules of the convention, which are the only rules that matter" and "barring any rules changes at the convention, delegates can vote their conscience on the first ballot." The group's co-founder, Eric O'Keefe, said, "Our goal is simple, to ensure the delegates are not misled to believe they must follow orders or rules set by others." O'Keefe added that he believes state laws and state party rules purporting to bind delegates to a particular candidate based on primary or caucus results are unenforceable and would lose a court challenge.

Delegates Unbound began airing national television advertisements in late June 2016. The group's first advertisement spliced together clips of President Ronald Reagan and Donald Trump and urged Republican delegates to follow their consciences. The group planned to spend $2.5 million to $3.5 million on education and anti-Trump efforts.

== See also ==
- Free the Delegates
- Stop Trump movement
- Our Principles PAC – an anti-Trump outside group that worked to elect anti-Trump delegates.
