= Dane Waters =

American political strategist

M. Dane Waters (born 1964) is a political strategist, elephant protection advocate, writer, and direct democracy advocate. He has worked on six continents providing strategic advice to campaigns, governments, activists, academic institutions, and NGOs. He has also consulted on projects with the United Nations, the U.S. Department of State and the International Republican Institute.

He was a political appointee in President George H. W. Bush's administration, served as the political director of the Humane Society Legislative Fund and director of Ballot Campaigns for the Humane Society of the United States and was the national field director for U.S. Term Limits.

== Career ==
=== Political campaigns ===
Dane has worked on six U.S. presidential campaigns in various paid and volunteer positions – Reagan/Bush (1984), Bush/Quayle (1988), Phil Graham (1996), John McCain (2000), McCain/Palin (2008), and John Kasich (2016). He has also worked on numerous other candidate elections in the U.S. as well as presidential and prime ministerial campaigns around the world. Dane has also been involved in numerous independent expenditure campaigns as the political director of the Humane Society Legislative Fund (HSLF). In 2020, he endorsed Democrat Joe Biden for president.

=== Direct democracy ===
Dane has worked on dozens of direct democracy campaigns in the U.S. and around the world and is one of the few people who has worked on all aspects of direct democracy campaigns – researching and writing on direct democracy, advising activists on direct democracy issues, helping governments draft direct democracy laws, helping win or defeat an issue on the ballot, to providing international observers to ensure that a referendum election meets internationally accepted norms.

Dane began his work with ballot campaigns as the national field director for U.S. Term Limits where he helped place a record number of term limit initiatives on the ballot between 1992 and 1998. These ballot initiatives helped voters in 23 states place term limits on their congressional delegations. Today there are term limits on 36 governors, 15 state legislatures and thousands of local officials because of these term limit initiatives.

Dane is the founder and chair of the Initiative & Referendum Institute at the University of Southern California – a non-profit non-partisan research and educational organization established to study direct democracy. He is the co-founder of the Initiative & Referendum Institute Europe. Dane also serves on the board of Democracy International, an organization that works to strengthen direct democracy opportunities around the world.

Dane has authored and edited numerous articles and books on direct democracy and has provided commentary on governance and direct democracy issues to newspapers, radio talk shows, and television stations around the world. He consulted on the television shows West Wing and the Weakest Link regarding direct democracy issues. He was a regular political columnist for Campaigns & Elections Magazine.

=== Delegates Unbound ===
After the 2016 Republican presidential election primaries, Dane co-founded Delegates Unbound – and organization whose primary focus was on educating delegates that they are unbound and free to vote as they see fit on all matters before the Republican National Convention, including whomever they wish to be the Republican nominee for president. The effort was unsuccessful, and delegates were forced to vote as directed by the RNC and not based on their conscience and who they felt would be the best candidate to represent Republican values.

During this effort Dane witnessed firsthand the vitriol that consumed and defined the 2016 presidential election. This prompted the production of a short documentary on what Dane's experiences entitled We Love You Dane Waters.

=== Political reform ===
Dane has also been active in political reform efforts serving as a member of the Harvard Appleseed Electoral Reform Project and as a board member of the Citizens in Charge Foundation.

=== 9-11 ===
Dane was honored to have been asked to help plan and execute the memorial service held on October 28, 2001, at Ground Zero for the families of those lost.

=== Elephant protection ===
Dane is also very active in animal welfare issues, especially the protection of elephants, and is the founder of The Elephant Project, a non-profit that develops new ideas and new solutions for the long-term protection of elephants. He does a regular blog and podcast on elephant issues which can be accessed by visiting The Elephant Times.
