= Eric O'Keefe (political activist) =

American political activist (born 1954)

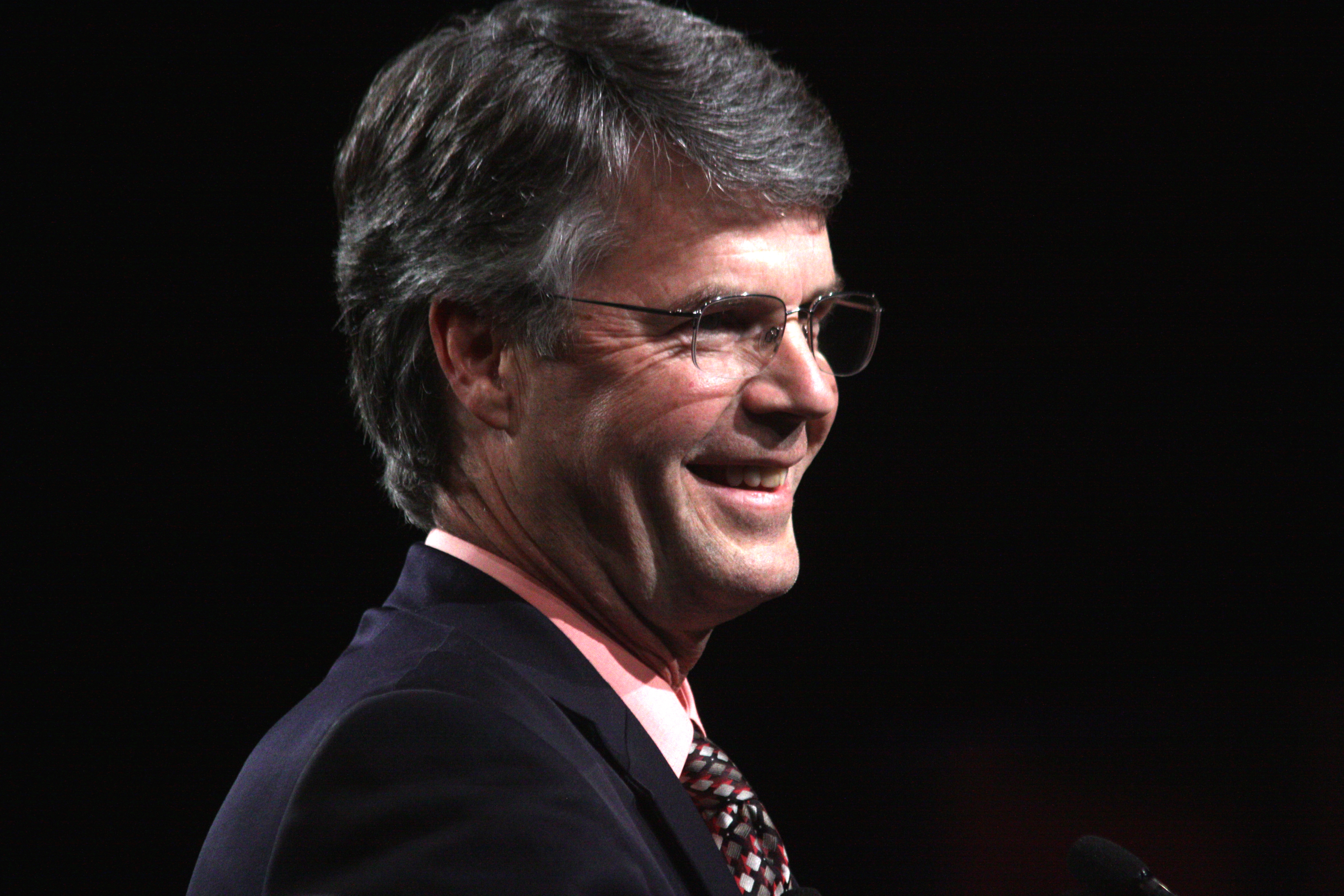
- O'Keefe in 2011
- Born: Eric Stephen O'Keefe; December 14, 1954 (age 71); Grosse Pointe, Michigan, US
- Occupation: Political activist
- Political party: Republican
- Spouse: Leslie Graves

Eric Stephen O'Keefe (born December 14, 1954) is an American political activist. In the 1990s, O'Keefe was involved in efforts to enact congressional term limits. He is involved as a strategist, board member, and donor with a number of organizations which seek to advance limited government and self-governance.

O'Keefe is the president of the board of directors of the Napolitan Institute. He is also on the board of directors of the Capital Research Center and the Institute for Free Speech. He is a founding board member of Citizens for Self-Governance.

He served as co-chairman and co-founder of the Campaign for Primary Accountability Political Action Committee and chairman of the Health Care Compact Alliance. He was the chairman and CEO of the Sam Adams Alliance, a former organization that promoted citizen activism.

== Political activities ==
=== Campaign for Primary Accountability ===
O'Keefe co-founded CPA with Joe Ricketts, Leo Linbeck III, and Tim Dunn. He is also co-chairman, and a financial supporter of the Campaign for Primary Accountability. The group is a political action committee which seeks "to oust entrenched members of Congress in their primary races, regardless of their party." The Campaign for Primary Accountability has spent $500,000 in 2012 congressional primary elections attempting to unseat both Democratic and Republican incumbents. The group spent $200,000 against Republican incumbent Jean Schmidt, who lost her primary bid.

The group also spent $239,000 against Republican incumbent Don Manzullo, who lost to primary challenger Adam Kinzinger.

=== Libertarian Party ===
O'Keefe became national director of the Libertarian Party in 1980.

=== Citizens for Self-Governance ===
O'Keefe is a founding board member of Citizens for Self-Governance, an organization that seeks to "elevate awareness and provide resources, advocacy, and education to grassroots organizations and individuals exercising their rights to govern themselves."

=== Wisconsin Club for Growth ===
O'Keefe is a director of the Wisconsin Club for Growth, a group which has spent $1 million on TV ads to support Wisconsin Governor Scott Walker's effort to make state workers "pay their fair share."

=== Health Care Compact Alliance ===
O'Keefe is the chairman of the Health Care Compact Alliance, a non-partisan 501(c)(4) organization that works "to create health care compacts that would shift Medicare, Medicaid and other federal health care funds to states to use as they wish." By March 2012, compact legislation had been introduced in 15 states and passed into law in six states: Missouri, Georgia, Texas, Oklahoma, Utah, and Indiana.

=== Term limits ===
O'Keefe was a founding board member of term limits advocacy group U.S. Term Limits and the architect of nationwide term limits campaigns in 1992 and 1994.

By early 1995, voters in 23 states had passed ballot initiatives limiting the terms of elected officials. In the case of U.S. Term Limits, Inc., v. Thornton, the Supreme Court ruled that states do not have the right to determine the conditions under which their representatives in Congress will serve. However, term limits governing state legislatures remain in force, and 15 states now have term-limited legislatures.

=== Americans for Limited Terms lawsuit ===
O'Keefe served as president of Americans for Limited Terms from 1996 to 2000. In the 1994, 1996, and 1998 congressional election cycles, Americans for Limited Terms ran ads in a number of congressional districts, advising voters about the positions on term limits held by their congressional candidates.

In 1996, ALT ran a $24,000 radio ad campaign in a Wisconsin political campaign that noted the opposition of State Assemblyman David Travis to term limits. Travis and the state board of elections responded by suing Americans for Limited Terms, claiming the ads were "express advocacy" instead of "issue ads." O'Keefe defended his position saying:

There's an effort by incumbents to clamp down on issue ads because it's the only area of campaign spending that's tilted against incumbents. In my view it's among the most important campaign spending because it's an outlet for dissenting voices. It's extremely vital in democracy.

=== Votenet ===
In 2001, O'Keefe became part-owner of a business, Votenet. Court records show that Votenet was victimized by two of its employees who were later convicted and imprisoned for financial fraud. Although an attorney recommended that the company declare bankruptcy to step away from the financial destruction caused by the felonious employees, O'Keefe chose to remain in business so creditors could be repaid.

=== Boards ===
Prior to 2007, O'Keefe served on the board of directors of Americans for Limited Government. In 2009, he joined the board of trustees of Chicago's Shimer College under then-president Thomas Lindsay. O'Keefe served on the board of directors of the Institute for Humane Studies until 2013.

=== Opposition to Donald Trump ===
O'Keefe was involved in the movement to stop Donald Trump from becoming the Republican presidential nominee in 2016. With attorney David B. Rivkin, he penned a column in The Wall Street Journal encouraging Republican delegates to the 2016 Republican National Convention to "recognize that they are bound only by their consciences." According to O'Keefe and Rivkin, "state laws that purport to bind delegates can't be enforced without violating the First Amendment."

O'Keefe formed a group called Delegates Unbound, which CNN described as "a robust effort to convince delegates that they have the authority and the ability to vote for whomever they want."

== John Doe investigation ==
Wisconsin Supreme Court ruling ending the investigation

To be clear, this conclusion ends the John Doe investigation because the special prosecutor's legal theory is unsupported in either reason or law. Consequently, the investigation is closed. Consistent with our decision and the order entered by Reserve Judge Peterson, we order that the special prosecutor and the district attorneys involved in this investigation must cease all activities related to the investigation, return all property seized in the investigation from any individual or organization, and permanently destroy all copies of information and other materials obtained through the investigation. All Unnamed Movants are relieved of any duty to cooperate further with the investigation.

— Wisconsin Supreme Court, Two Unnamed Petitioners v. Peterson, 2015 WI 85

In October 2013, it was revealed that John Chisholm, the Democratic District Attorney of Milwaukee County, had launched a secret "John Doe investigation" into the activities of Wisconsin conservatives. Wisconsin is one of three states that allow John Doe investigations, in which prosecutors are allowed to compel people to produce documents and give testimony as well as bar them from talking publicly about the investigation. These types of investigations are called "John Doe probes" as their purpose is to determine whether a crime has been committed, and if so, by whom. Prosecutors are allowed to conduct their investigation in secret and can order targets and witnesses not to tell anyone about the matter. Francis Schmitz, a Republican, was appointed special prosecutor in the probe. The probe, launched in the summer of 2012, was investigating whether conservative groups in Wisconsin had engaged in illegal campaign coordination.

In November 2013, O'Keefe defied the gag order, and confirmed to The Wall Street Journal that he had received a subpoena in early October 2013 regarding the John Doe investigation. O'Keefe told The Wall Street Journal that at least three other targets of the investigation had their homes raided at dawn by law-enforcement officers who seized belongings, including computers and files.

In February 2014, O'Keefe sued in federal court to stop the investigation on the grounds that it violated his free speech rights. In May 2014, U.S. District Judge Rudolph Randa halted the state's investigation. Chisholm and Schmitz asked the 7th Circuit Court of Appeals to suspend Randa's ruling. The 7th Circuit Court denied the request. Dodge County, Wisconsin circuit judge Steven Bauer, a Democrat, ruled, on November 6, 2014, in an investigation into Chisholm's conduct, that Chisholm had acted "in good faith".

On March 27, 2015, the Wisconsin Supreme Court ruled, 4–2 (after one justice recused herself) that it would not hear arguments, either in public or in secret, citing "the long tradition of open courts and the secrecy of the John Doe." Chief Justice Shirley Abrahamson and Justice David Prosser, although political polar opposites, both dissented. Abrahamson argued, among other points, that "The court's failure to provide further justification for its highly unusual decision to cancel oral argument is, in my view, alarming." Prosser argued that the court should hear oral arguments in secret, then release edited transcripts and video.

On July 16, 2015, the Wisconsin Supreme Court ruled in favor of O'Keefe and the other individuals targeted for investigation, finding that the prosecutors had not shown any evidence of express advocacy for a specific candidate and that their issue advocacy, whether or not it had been coordinated with elected officials or candidates, was protected by the First Amendment. The court ended the investigation, ordered prosecutors to return all seized property and destroy all information they had obtained.

== Publications ==
O'Keefe is the author of Who Rules America: The People Versus the Political Class, which makes the case for term limits. His book won praise from economist Milton Friedman. With Aaron Steelman, he is the author of The End of Representation: How Congress Stifles Electoral Competition. He has also been published in The Wall Street Journal, The Christian Science Monitor, and The Encyclopedia of Libertarianism.

== Personal life ==
O'Keefe is a private investor who lives in Spring Green, Wisconsin. He is married to Leslie Graves, who is the founder of the Lucy Burns Institute, a nonprofit organization that publishes Ballotpedia.
