= Carie Graves =

American rower (1953–2021)

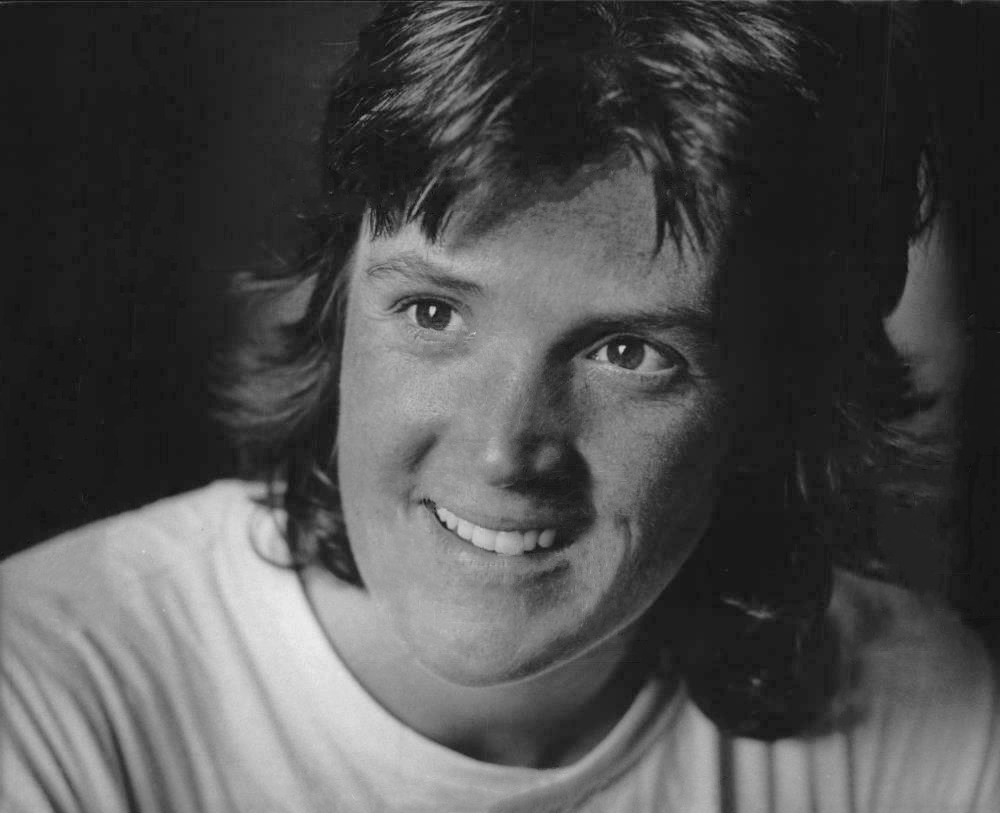
- Graves in 1984

Personal information
- Full name: Carie Brand Graves
- Born: June 27, 1953 Madison, Wisconsin, U.S.
- Died: December 19, 2021 (aged 68)
- Height: 186 cm (6 ft 1 in)
- Weight: 77 kg (170 lb)

Sport
- Sport: Rowing
- Club: Boston Rowing Club
Medal record
Representing the United States
Olympic Games
Gold medal – first place	1984 Los Angeles	Eights
Bronze medal – third place	1976 Montreal	Eights
World Rowing Championships
Silver medal – second place	1975 Nottingham	Eights

Carie Brand Graves (June 17, 1953 – December 19, 2021) was an American rower and collegiate rowing coach. Competing in the women's eights, she won a gold medal at the 1984 Olympics and a bronze in 1976. She was also in the crew that in 1975 won the first national championship won by a University of Wisconsin varsity women's team.

== Early life ==
Carie Graves was born in Madison, Wisconsin to parents Robert and Dyrele (Derry) Graves. Carie grew up in Wyoming Township near Spring Green, Wisconsin, and she attended River Valley High School. Her paternal grandparents had moved to the Spring Green area in the 1930s from South Dakota so that Ben Graves, her grandfather, could take up a position as the land and farm manager at the renowned Taliesin. Her father, Robert Graves, had rowed for the University of Wisconsin–Madison. Derry Graves, who came from a circus family in Baraboo, Wisconsin, was a trained registered nurse. In the late 1960s, she worked as a nurse at the Badger Army Ammunition Plant, while Robert farmed.

== Rowing career ==
=== Collegiate ===
Graves's first experience with rowing was as a walk-on when she was a sophomore at the University of Wisconsin–Madison in the fall of 1973. In the spring of 1975 her team won the women's national championships in Princeton, New Jersey. Her first international success came in 1975 when she won a silver medal in the eight-oared shell at the World Championships, as part of what came to be known as the "Red Rose Crew", coached by Harry Parker.

=== Olympic ===
Graves qualified for the 1976 Olympic team in the eight and won an Olympic bronze medal, the first time women's rowing was included in the Olympics. Graves continued to row and train during her tenure as head rowing coach for women at Harvard/Radcliffe, the first female Head Rowing Coach in the United States. She was a member of the 1980 Olympic team, rowing in the eight that won the Lucerne International Regatta over East Germany, but was unable to compete due to the boycott of the 1980 Summer Olympics in Moscow, Russia. She was one of 461 athletes to receive a Congressional Gold Medal. Her last Olympic competition was at the 1984 Summer Olympics in Los Angeles, California where she won a Gold Medal on the women's eight team.

=== Nike World Games ===
In 1998, Graves and her three sisters competed in team rowing at the Nike World Games under the name Team Four Sisters. One of Graves' sisters is Leslie Graves, founder of the Lucy Burns Institute.

=== Other ===
In 1981 Graves was the six-oar for the women's eight that finished second at the World Championships in Munich. Also in 1981 she and her teammates raced in a four and won at the Henley Royal Regatta. This was the first time women were allowed to race at Henley.

== Recognition ==
In 2022, USRowing named its Female Athlete of the Year Award in honor of Graves. UWRowing board member Taylor Ritzel said, "As a female rower in the U.S., you knew who Carie Graves was even if you'd never met her. Her grit, fearlessness, and leadership were attributes I remember learning about even as I was starting the sport. Not only did she pave the way for decades of strong American female rowers to follow, but her commitment to her team and bettering the sport directly impacted me and my teammates' opportunities in rowing."

== Coaching ==
After earning a Master's from Harvard, Graves went back to coaching in Boston at Northeastern University for 10 years. She then was recruited by the University of Texas, Austin to start their new rowing program in 1998. As coach of the Longhorns, Graves led the team to four consecutive Big 12 Conference championships between 2009 and 2012. She retired from coaching in 2014.

== Personal life and death ==
Graves died on December 19, 2021, at the age of 68.
