= Wisconsin Club for Growth =

Conservative nonprofit

The Wisconsin Club for Growth is a 501(c)(4) nonprofit organization based in Wisconsin. It financially supported Wisconsin governor Scott Walker during the 2012 election that sought to recall him. It had $8 million in revenue in 2012.

== Governance ==
The Wisconsin Club for Growth is directed by Eric O'Keefe and R. J. Johnson, the latter of whom worked on Scott Walker's 2010 and 2012 campaigns.

== Funds disbursed ==
These are among funds given:

- In 2011, $4.2 million to Citizens for a Strong America treasurer Valerie Johnson (the wife of R. J. Johnson) and director John Connors,
- $450,000 to the Austin, Texas–based Alliance for Self-Governance, an inactive tax-exempt operation launched by O’Keefe,
- $250,000 to the Washington, D.C.–based voucher group American Federation for Children,
- $2.9 million to the political arm of the Wisconsin Manufacturers & Commerce.

== Donations received ==
These are among donations received:

- $1,500,000 from John Menard Jr.,
- $1,000,000 from Stephen Cohen, the founder of SAC Capitol Advisors,
- $700,000 from Gogebic Taconite LLC, owned by Chris Cline,
- $250,000 from hedge fund CEO Paul Singer,
- $100,000 from manufacturer Maclean-Fogg Co,
- $50,000 from Atlanticus Holdings CEO David Hanna's trust,
- $50,000 from hedge fund chairman Bruce Kovner,
- $50,000 from natural gas and oil producer Devon Energy,
- $15,000 from Home Depot co-founder Ken Langone,
- $15,000 from Donald Trump,
- $50,000 from Richard Colburn, vice-president of Consolidated Electrical Distributors,
- $25,000 from Keith Colburn, president of Consolidated Electrical Distributors.

== See also ==
- Club for Growth
- 2011 Wisconsin protests
- 2011 Wisconsin Act 10
- Wisconsin Economic Development Corporation
- Dark money
- Money loop
