= Gogebic =

Gogebic may refer to:

- Gogebic Community College in Ironwood, Michigan
- Gogebic County, Michigan in the Upper Peninsula of Michigan
- Gogebic Range, a mountainous area in the Upper Peninsula of Michigan
- Gogebic Taconite, an iron-ore mining company
- Lake Gogebic in the Upper Peninsula of Michigan
- Lake Gogebic State Park in the Upper Peninsula of Michigan
