= Matt Cartwright =

American politician (born 1961)

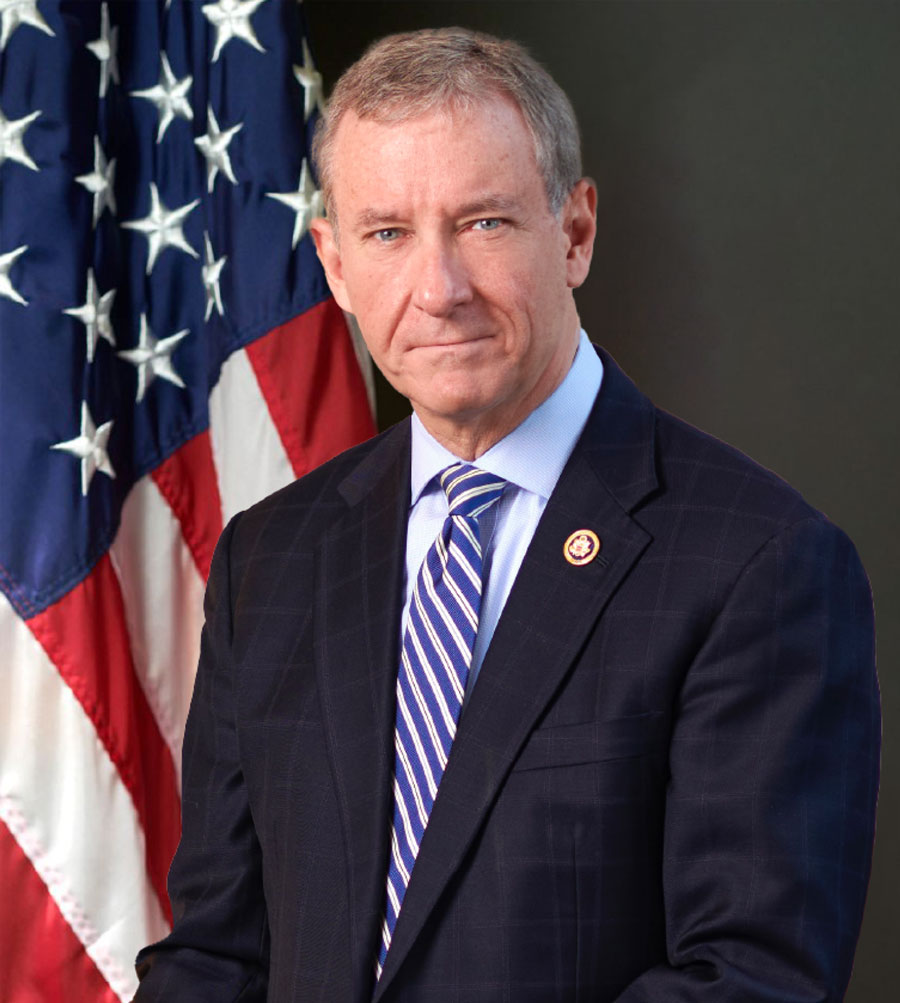
- Official portrait, 2024

Member of the U.S. House of Representatives from Pennsylvania
- In office January 3, 2013 – January 3, 2025
- Preceded by: Tim Holden
- Succeeded by: Rob Bresnahan
- Constituency: 17th district (2013–2019); 8th district (2019–2025)
Party positions
Co-Chair of the House Democratic Policy and Communications Committee
In office January 3, 2019 – January 3, 2023 Serving with Debbie Dingell, Ted Lieu and Joe Neguse
Leader	Nancy Pelosi
Preceded by	Cheri Bustos; David Cicilline; Hakeem Jeffries
Succeeded by	Veronica Escobar; Dean Phillips; Lauren Underwood

Personal details
- Born: Matthew Alton Cartwright; May 1, 1961 (age 65) Erie, Pennsylvania, U.S.
- Party: Democratic
- Spouse: Marion Munley (m. 1985)
- Children: 2
- Education: Hamilton College (BA); University of Pennsylvania (JD)

Matthew Alton Cartwright (born May 1, 1961) is an American lawyer and politician who served as the U.S. representative for Pennsylvania's 8th congressional district from 2013 to 2025. The district includes a large swath of northeastern Pennsylvania, anchored by Scranton, Wilkes-Barre, and the Poconos. He is a member of the Democratic Party. Cartwright was first elected to Congress in 2012 after defeating incumbent Tim Holden in the Democratic primary. As an attorney, Cartwright previously worked at the law firm of Munley, Munley, and Cartwright.

Cartwright was unseated in the 2024 House elections, where he lost to first-time challenger Rob Bresnahan.

== Early life and education ==
Cartwright was born on May 1, 1961, in Erie, Pennsylvania, the son of Alton S. Cartwright and Adelaide (Igoe) Cartwright. He attended Upper Canada College (Toronto), graduating in 1979, before earning a Bachelor of Arts in history, magna cum laude, from Hamilton College in 1983, where he graduated Phi Beta Kappa.

Cartwright studied law at the University of Pennsylvania Law School, receiving his Juris Doctor degree in 1986. In 1981, Cartwright attended the London School of Economics, where he met his future wife, Marion Munley. After graduating from law school, Cartwright worked as an associate in the litigation department of the Philadelphia law firm Montgomery, McCracken, Walker & Rhoads, practicing commercial and securities litigation. In 1988, both Munley and Cartwright joined the Munley family's law firm in the Scranton area.

== Legal career ==
For 24 years, Cartwright worked as an attorney and partner at Munley Law Personal Injury Attorneys (formerly Munley, Munley and Cartwright), a Scranton firm representing victims, consumers and small businesses in personal and business litigation. He was admitted to the Pennsylvania Bar in 1986 and in 2005 was further admitted to the Bar of New York. In 2008, Cartwright was inducted into the International Society of Barristers.

From 2009 to 2012, Cartwright served as a member of the Board of Governors of the American Association for Justice. Between 2005 and 2011, Cartwright was the on-air legal analyst for The Law & You. In the segment, aired nightly as part of NBC affiliate WBRE-TV's evening newscast, he fielded viewer questions on legal matters. In 2011, Cartwright co-authored the legal treatise Litigating Commercial and Business Tort Cases published by Thomson Reuters.

During the 1992 presidential election, Cartwright was an elected delegate for Bill Clinton at the Democratic National Convention, representing Pennsylvania's 10th congressional district. In 2001–2002, he served as District Governor for Rotary International District 7410, covering northeastern Pennsylvania. On November 5, 2010, the Boy Scouts of America's Northeastern Pennsylvania Council presented Cartwright with its Silver Beaver Award for volunteer service to that organization.

== U.S. House of Representatives ==
=== Elections ===
==== 2012 ====
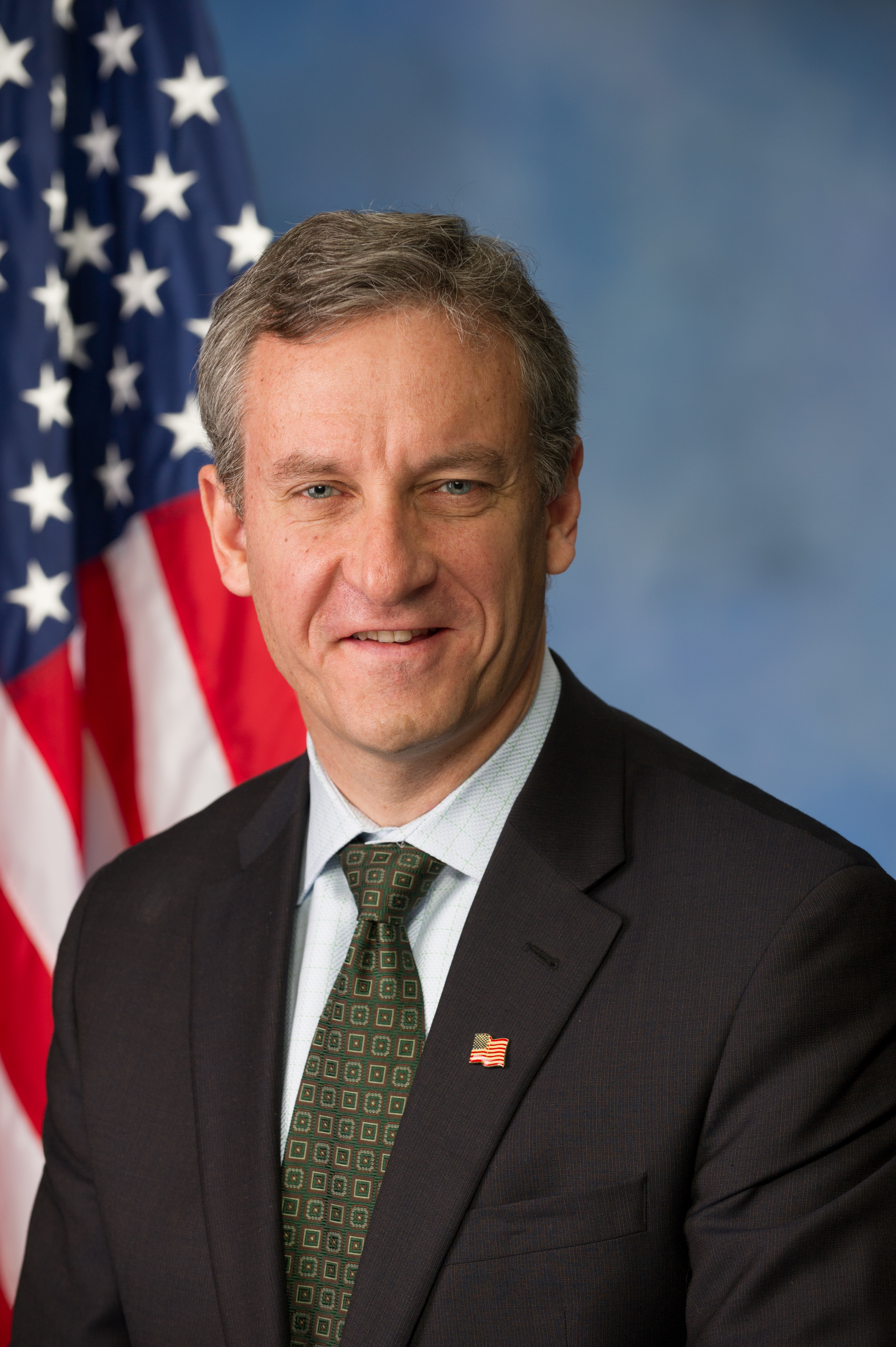
Cartwright during the 113th United States Congress

Pennsylvania Republicans, who controlled the redistricting process after the 2010 United States census, significantly altered Holden's 17th district. The old 17th had been based in Harrisburg, but the new 17th had been pushed well to the north and east. In the process, it absorbed heavily Democratic Scranton and Wilkes-Barre, previously in the 11th district. The remap significantly altered the 17th's demographics. The old 17th had been anchored in traditionally Republican territory in central Pennsylvania; in much of the district, Holden was the only elected Democrat above the county level. John McCain carried it with 51 percent of the vote. In contrast, the new 17th was anchored in northeastern Pennsylvania, which had long been the most Democratic region of the state outside of Philadelphia and Pittsburgh. Had the district existed in 2008, Barack Obama would have carried it with 56 percent of the vote.

An internal poll from Cartwright showed him up seven points against Holden, the incumbent. The new district was significantly bluer than its predecessor and was located in territory where constituents were unfamiliar with Holden. The only portion of the district that had been in the old 17th was Holden's home in Schuylkill County, Pennsylvania, with the majority of Democratic primary voters located in counties considered more favorable to Cartwright's candidacy. During the primary, Cartwright described himself as being from "the Democratic wing of the Democratic Party"—a line often employed by Howard Dean and Paul Wellstone. He was supported by MoveOn.org, the League of Conservation Voters, and the Campaign for Primary Accountability. His campaign staff included Daniela Amodei, later a cofounder of Anthropic.

Cartwright ran as a self-professed "FDR Democrat", and as an ally of President Obama on taxes and health care reform, and pledged to work with U.S. Senator Robert P. Casey Jr., also of Scranton, on regulations for safety in fracking. Cartwright also benefited in the race from endorsements from popular local public figures like State Representative Phyllis Mundy and former Scranton mayor Jimmy Connors. Holden's opposition to the Patient Protection and Affordable Care Act and his support of energy legislation that included the Halliburton loophole are believed to have contributed to his defeat. On April 24, 2012, Cartwright defeated Holden by 57%–43%, in the primary.

In the November general election, Cartwright faced Republican nurse Laureen Cummings, a leader of the Scranton Tea Party. On November 6, Cartwright defeated Cummings by 61%–39%, to become the district's next congressman.

On January 4, 2013, Cartwright was selected by his peers to serve as a class president of the 49 new Democratic members of the 113th Congress.

==== 2014 ====
On November 4, 2014, Cartwright won a second term, defeating Republican challenger David Moylan, M.D., the elected Coroner of Schuylkill County, by 13.6 points.

==== 2016 ====
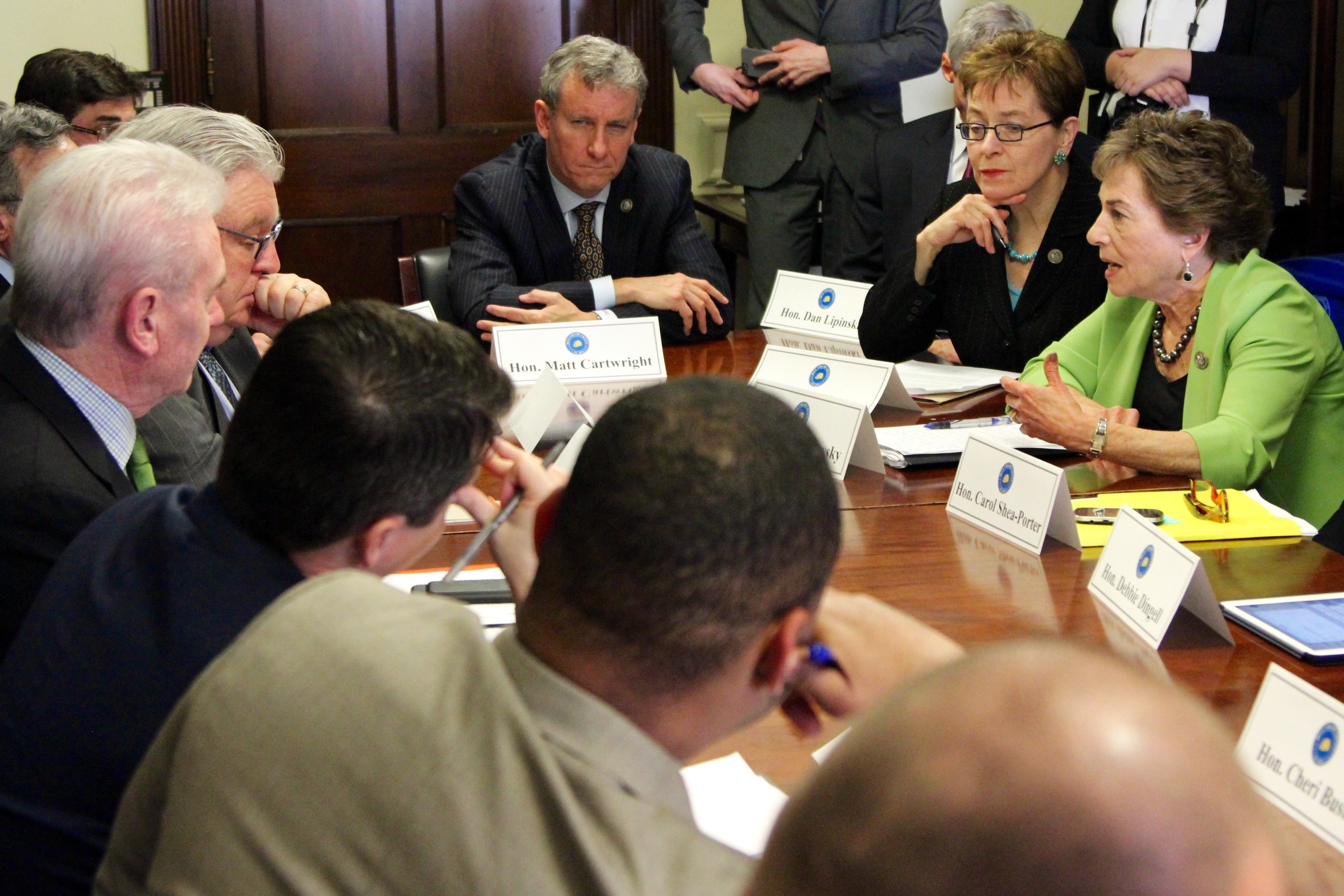
Cartwright (head of table) meeting with AFL-CIO members in 2017

On November 8, 2016, Cartwright won a third term, defeating Republican challenger Matthew Connolly, a businessman from Northampton County, by seven points.

==== 2018 ====
In the 2016 general election, President Donald Trump won the 17th district by over 10% in the concurrent presidential election. Facing an underfunded opponent, Cartwright did not run television advertisements. That year, Cartwright won re-election by only seven points, representing his lowest margin of victory. As a result, the National Republican Congressional Committee began to see Cartwright as potentially vulnerable, and listed him as a top target. In response, the Democratic Congressional Campaign Committee included him on its "frontline" list. Despite this, the district was rated as Likely D, meaning it was expected that Cartwright would win re-election.

After the Supreme Court of Pennsylvania threw out Pennsylvania's previous congressional map, Cartwright's district was renumbered as the 8th district. It was pushed to the north and now covers the northeast corner of the state, but it also sweeps west to grab Scranton and Wilkes-Barre. In the process, it absorbed the remainder of Lackawanna County previously in the 10th district, as well as almost all of Luzerne County.

In the election, Cartwright faced a self-funding opponent who spent $1.7 million of his family's money in the race, in total outspending Cartwright by nearly $300,000, including direct expenditures of $625,778 by the NRCC.

Cartwright won his fourth term by 9.3% with 54.65% of the vote without financial assistance from the DCCC.

Following the general election, Cartwright was elected to House Democratic leadership, to serve as co-chair of the Democratic Policy and Communications Committee for the 116th Congress in the House Democratic Caucus elections.

==== 2020 ====
On November 3, 2020, despite Donald Trump again carrying his district, Cartwright won a fifth term, defeating Republican challenger Jim Bognet, the former senior vice president for communications of the Export–Import Bank of the United States, by 3.6 points. In contrast, Trump won the district against Democratic challenger and Scranton native Joe Biden by 4.4 points during the concurrent presidential election. At 8%, Cartwright's 2020 victory represented the largest over-performance by a Democrat in Pennsylvania compared to the presidential result, and the second largest for a Democratic win in a district Trump carried in the entire House, only behind Jared Golden of Maine. As a result, Cartwright became one of only seven incumbent Democratic Representatives in the U.S. House to win their seats despite Trump prevailing over Biden in them. He also was one of only three Democrats in the U.S. House to defend their seats successfully despite Donald Trump winning their districts twice.

Following the general election, Cartwright was re-elected to House Democratic leadership, to serve as co-chair of the Democratic Policy and Communications Committee for the 117th Congress in the 2020 United States House of Representatives Democratic Caucus leadership elections.

On January 25, 2021, Cartwright was elected Chairman of the House Appropriations Subcommittee on Commerce, Justice and Science and Related Agencies.

==== 2022 ====
Cartwright ran for reelection in 2022 in a rematch against Bognet. Cartwright won the election by 2.4 points.

In the lead-up to the election, the 8th District's race was seen as potentially determining whether or not the Democratic Party would maintain control of the U.S. House of Representatives. Cartwright did win his race, but Democrats ultimately lost their majority in the House.

In 2022, Cartwright appeared in advertisements praising one of his top donor's law firm in what Axios described as "an apparent misunderstanding over video shot for the Pennsylvania Democrat's bill about water contamination at Camp Lejeune." Members of Congress are not allowed to use official resources to promote commercial activity. Cartwright sent a cease and desist letter to the law firm, which took down the ads.

Outside spending on behalf of Jim Bognet in the 2020 race totalled $383,105, when Bognet lost by 3.6%. In the 2022 race, outside spending amassed on behalf of Bognet reached $7,267,960, and he lost by 2.4%.

Following the election, Cartwright was the only member of the Congressional Progressive Caucus from a district which voted for Donald Trump for president.

==== 2024 ====
The 8th District race in 2024 was considered to be a toss-up. The Democratic Congressional Campaign Committee placed Cartwright in their "Frontline Program" due to his vulnerable incumbency status; he received extra fundraising support from the campaign committee. Cartwright was defeated in the general election by Republican nominee Rob Bresnahan.

=== Committee assignments ===
- Committee on Appropriations
  - Subcommittee on Commerce, Justice and Science (Ranking Member)
  - Subcommittee on Financial Services and General Government
- House Democratic Committee on Steering and Policy
  - Elected representative for Pennsylvania, Ohio, Kentucky and West Virginia

=== Caucus memberships ===
- Congressional Taiwan Caucus
- Congressional Progressive Caucus
- Congressional Ukraine Caucus
- House Military Depot and Industrial Facilities Caucus
- Congressional Solar Caucus
- Sustainable Energy and Environment Coalition Caucus
- Congressional Wildlife Refuge Caucus
- United States Congressional International Conservation Caucus
- Veterinary Medicine Caucus
- Climate Solutions Caucus
- Blue Collar Caucus
- House Pro-Choice Caucus

== Post-congressional career ==
Cartwright was appointed to the board of the Pennsylvania Northeast Regional Railroad Authority, with his term expiring in 2029. In June 2025, Cartwright joined the law firm Lowey Dannenberg, P.C., as a partner in their Healthcare Litigation practice group, which brings claims against pharmaceutical and medical device manufacturers.

== Political positions ==
Cartwright voted with President Joe Biden's stated position 100% of the time, according to FiveThirtyEight analysis completed in January 2023.

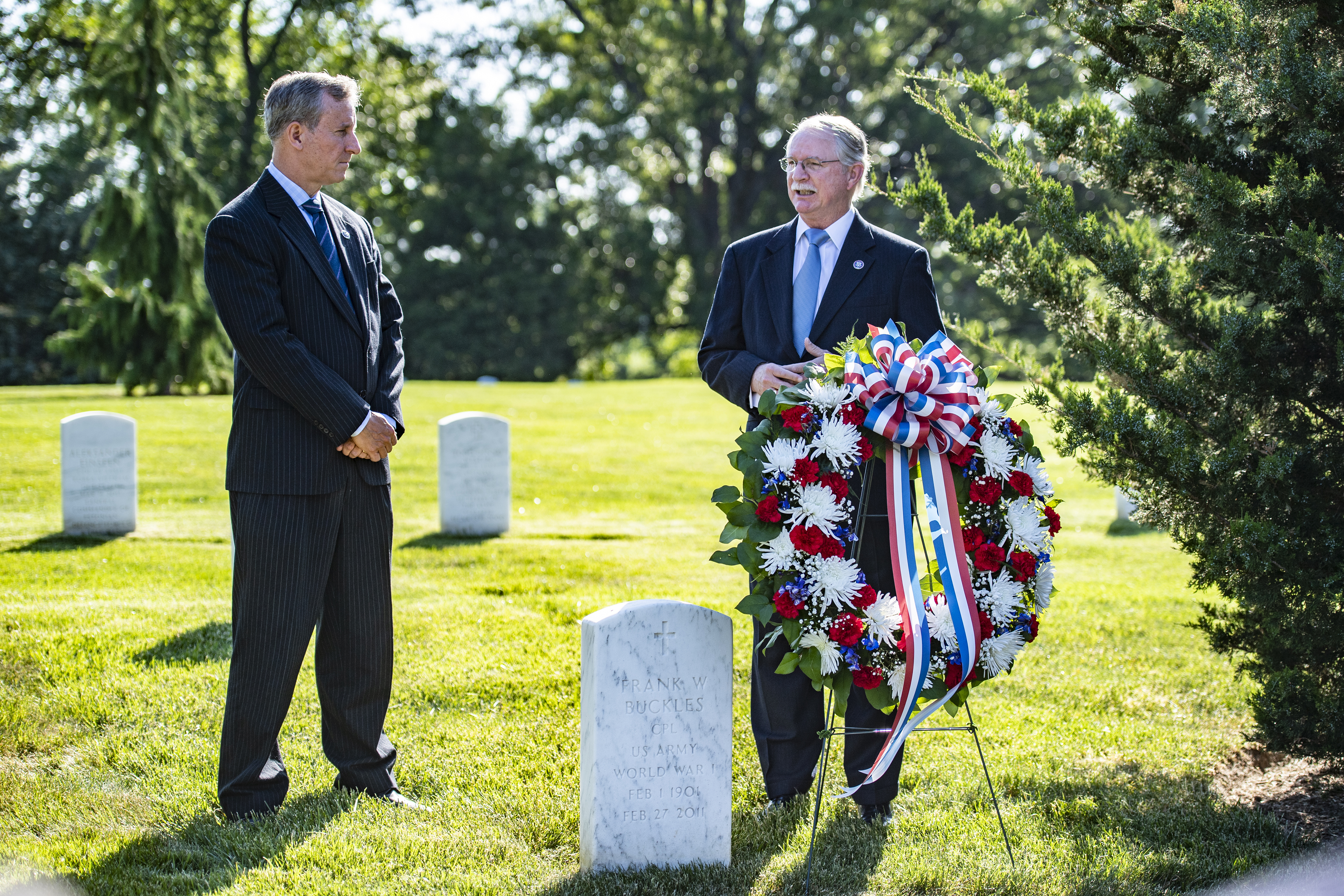
Cartwright at a wreath-laying ceremony with Rep. John Rutherford (R-FL)

=== Healthcare ===
Ed O'Keefe of the Washington Post wrote on November 3, 2013, that Cartwright was elected largely based on the Affordable Care Act "because the veteran moderate Democrat he challenged in a primary voted against it." According to O'Keefe, "Cartwright spent his first year in office preparing constituents for 'the ACA'."

In May 2017, Cartwright voted against the Republican-sponsored American Health Care Act. Cartwright said in January 2018 that he continued to support the Affordable Care Act. Cartwright also supports Medicare for All.

=== Veterans ===
In 2021, Cartwright introduced the Camp Lejeune Justice Act, which became law as part of Section 706 of the Honoring our PACT Act. This created a new federal cause of action for those exposed to and injured by the toxins in the water at Marine Corps Base Camp Lejeune. Until this became law, only exposed veterans had the possibility of compensation (as a VA disability benefit) because the federal courts cut off the right to sue under the Federal Tort Claims Act in MDL-2218.

=== Immigration ===
In July 2015, Cartwright voted against a bill that would have withdrawn funding from municipalities that declined to detain illegal immigrants for ICE.

In June 2017, Cartwright was one of three Democrats who joined the 228–195 majority voting to cut off some particular federal grants from cities not agreeing to detentions. He voted for "Kate's Law", to increase criminal punishment for illegal immigrant recidivist violent criminals. He co-sponsored legislation to protect the "Dreamers", people who entered the country illegally as children. When Trump ordered a temporary limit on immigration from certain countries, Cartwright criticized the order.

On May 8, 2024, Cartwright voted against the "Equal Representation Act." This proposed law would have required that when counting the population of each state to determine the number of U.S. Representatives, noncitizens who are ineligible to vote would be excluded from the count.

=== Technology ===
Cartwright supported net neutrality.

=== Economic issues ===
Cartwright criticized the Trump tax cut, saying that it gave taxpayers little relief while adding huge sums to the national debt.

=== Environment ===
On February 26, 2014, Cartwright introduced the Streamlining Energy Efficiency for Schools Act of 2014 (H.R. 4092; 113th Congress), a bill that would require the United States Department of Energy to establish a centralized clearinghouse to disseminate information on federal programs, incentives, and mechanisms for financing energy-efficient retrofits and upgrades at schools. Cartwright argued that "the bill is a strategic and cost-saving investment to relieve the fiscal pressure felt by schools across the country while bringing us closer to energy security." Cartwright's bill passed unanimously out of the Energy and Commerce Committee on April 30, 2014. It passed the full House of Representatives on June 23, 2014. During his final term in office, Cartwright served as a Vice Chair of the Sustainable Energy and Environment Coalition.

=== Gun policy ===
During his first month in office, Cartwright co-sponsored four bills involving gun control. He opposes gun-makers' legal immunity after a crime has occurred, and he opposes assault rifle sales.

In 2022, Cartwright voted for H.R. 1808: Assault Weapons Ban of 2022.

=== LGBT stance ===
Cartwright has said, "there's no reason to discriminate against gay people". He does not believe religious leaders should be mandated to perform same-sex wedding ceremonies.

=== Student loans ===
In October 2018, Cartwright co-authored a Washington Post article proposing a pilot program to examine the effectiveness of non-transferable financial incentives such as certain student loan forgiveness being given to increase organ donation.

=== Transportation ===
Cartwright pushed for re-establishing a passenger rail line between Northeastern Pennsylvania and New York City, which was last operated in the early 1970s with Erie Lackawanna Railway's Phoebe Snow Passenger Service. This restoration would use funds from the Infrastructure Investment and Jobs Act, also known as the INVEST in America Act.

=== Marjorie Taylor Greene ===
Cartwright cosponsored a resolution to expel Georgia Republican Rep. Marjorie Taylor Greene from Congress, suggesting that she "advocated violence against our peers, the Speaker and our government."

=== Eminent domain ===
In 2014, Cartwright voted against H.R. 1944: The Private Property Rights Protection Act of 2014, a law that limits the use of eminent domain by state governments.

=== COVID-19 policy ===
On January 31, 2023, Cartwright voted against H.R.497:Freedom for Health Care Workers Act, a bill which would lift COVID-19 vaccine mandates for healthcare workers.

On February 1, 2023, Cartwright voted against a resolution to end COVID-19 national emergency.

=== Foreign policy ===
==== Syria ====
In 2013, Cartwright voted in favor of intervention and arming the Syrian Opposition against Bashar al-Assad and ISIS.

In 2023, Cartwright voted against H.Con.Res. 21 which directed President Joe Biden to remove U.S. troops from Syria within 180 days.

==== Trade ====
Cartwright voted against H. J. Res 39, which would condemn Biden's lift on tariffs pertaining to solar panels coming from China.

==== Somalia ====
In 2023, Cartwright voted against H.Con.Res. 30, which would remove American troops from Somalia.

==== Ukraine ====
Cartwright has said supporting Ukraine during the Russian invasion is a "vital problem for American national security." In 2023, Cartwright voted against a ban on cluster munitions to Ukraine.

==== Israel ====
Cartwright voted to provide Israel with support following 2023 Hamas attack on Israel. In 2024, Cartwright was one of 16 Democrats in the House of Representatives to vote to undo President Biden's pause on some weapons shipments to Israel amid a humanitarian crisis in Gaza.

== Electoral history ==
Pennsylvania's 17th Congressional District, 2012
Party	Candidate	Votes	%
Democratic	Matt Cartwright	161,393	60.31
Republican	Laureen Cummings	106,208	39.69
Total votes		267,601	100
Democratic hold			

Pennsylvania's 17th Congressional District, 2014
Party	Candidate	Votes	%
Democratic	Matt Cartwright (Incumbent)	93,680	56.76
Republican	David Moylan	71,371	43.24
Total votes		165,051	100
Democratic hold			

Pennsylvania's 17th Congressional District, 2016
Party	Candidate	Votes	%
Democratic	Matt Cartwright (Incumbent)	157,734	53.80
Republican	Matt Connolly	135,430	46.20
Total votes		293,164	100
Democratic hold			

Pennsylvania's 8th Congressional District, 2018
Party	Candidate	Votes	%
Democratic	Matt Cartwright (Incumbent)	134,519	54.65
Republican	John Chrin	111,640	45.35
Total votes		246,159	100
Democratic hold			

Pennsylvania's 8th Congressional District, 2020
Party	Candidate	Votes	%
Democratic	Matt Cartwright (Incumbent)	178,442	51.77
Republican	Jim Bognet	166,227	48.23
Total votes		344,669	100
Democratic hold			

Pennsylvania's 8th Congressional District, 2022
Party	Candidate	Votes	%
Democratic	Matt Cartwright (incumbent)	146,956	51.22
Republican	Jim Bognet	139,930	48.78
Total votes		286,886	100
Democratic hold			

Pennsylvania's 8th Congressional District, 2024
Party	Candidate	Votes	%
Republican	Rob Bresnahan Jr.	195,663	50.8
Democratic	Matt Cartwright (incumbent)	189,411	49.2
Total votes		385,074	100.0
Republican gain from Democratic			

== Personal life ==
Cartwright married Marion K. Munley on August 10, 1985, in Archbald, Pennsylvania. They live in Moosic, Pennsylvania, with their two sons. Cartwright is Roman Catholic.

U.S. House of Representatives
Preceded by Tim Holden	Member of the U.S. House of Representatives from Pennsylvania's 17th congressional district 2013–2019	Succeeded by Conor Lamb
Preceded by Brian Fitzpatrick	Member of the U.S. House of Representatives from Pennsylvania's 8th congressional district 2019–2025	Succeeded by Rob Bresnahan
U.S. order of precedence (ceremonial)
Preceded by Charlie Dent as Former U.S. Representative	Order of precedence of the United States as Former U.S. Representative	Succeeded by Jim Courter as Former U.S. Representative
