= Leslie Graves (nonprofit executive) =

American nonprofit executive

- Education: St. John's College
- Occupation: Nonprofit executive
- Known for: Founder of Ballotpedia

Leslie Graves is the founder and CEO of Ballotpedia, the nonprofit online political encyclopedia of American politics.

== Education and career ==
Graves has a bachelor's degree in liberal arts from St. John's College, Annapolis, Maryland. She did graduate work in philosophy at the University of Wisconsin–Madison.

She co-authored "Is indeterminism the source of the statistical character of evolutionary theory?" in the Philosophy of Science and wrote "Transgressive traditions and art definitions" for the Journal of Aesthetics and Art Criticism.

She collected signatures to qualify the Libertarian Party's presidential candidate, Ed Clark, for a spot on the ballot in the 1980 United States presidential election. She later served as Wisconsin chair of the Libertarian Party, and as the party's national finance chair.

== Ballotpedia ==
Graves founded the Lucy Burns Institute in 2007, a nonpartisan nonprofit organization that publishes Ballotpedia. She authored a guidebook in 2012, titled Local Ballot Initiatives: How citizens change laws with clipboards, conversations, and campaigns.

Her political analysis has been included in the Wall Street Journal, Reuters, Bloomberg News, Campaigns and Elections, and the Milwaukee Journal Sentinel.

=== Judgepedia ===
Judgepedia was launched in 2007 by the Chicago-based nonprofit, Sam Adams Alliance. Graves was "busy at that time with WikIFOIA," and did not think she could take on a project the size of Judgepedia. However, she stayed involved in the project as a volunteer and then a consultant. When the founding editor of the Judgepedia project left the Sam Adams Alliance in 2009, a staff member from Graves' group stepped in as editor, which led to the decision to cede sponsorship to the Lucy Burns Institute in July.

== Personal life ==
Graves is one of five children of Robert and Derry Graves. Her older sister was Olympic rower and gold-medalist Carie Graves. All four Graves sisters (Carie, Leslie, Tia, and Alison) competed in team rowing at the Nike Master's World Games in 1998 under the name "Team Four Sisters."
