= Sunshine Review =

- Founded: July 2008
- Dissolved: 9 July 2013
- Location: Alexandria, Virginia
- Region served: United States

Sunshine Review was an American nonprofit organization that advocated for increased government transparency.

Sunshine Review was a website prior to becoming its own nonprofit organization. The wiki-based website was launched in July 2008 as a project of the Sam Adams Alliance. In 2010, Sunshine Review separated from the Sam Adams Alliance and launched its own organization with a mission of educating the public about proactive disclosure of government data and other open government initiatives.

Sunshine Review addressed several areas of transparency, including state spending, state sunshine laws, and rating local government websites on transparency. Sunshine Review worked with the National Taxpayers Union to develop information on state spending, and with the Lucy Burns Institute which runs the WikiFOIA project. Sunshine Review developed a ten-point transparency checklist to evaluate if government websites proactively and voluntarily disclose information to the public and media.

On July 9, 2013, Sunshine Review was acquired by the Lucy Burns Institute and merged into Ballotpedia.

== Website evaluations ==
In March 2010, the organization reported that it had evaluated over 5,000 government websites, including 3,140 counties, 805 cities, and 1,560 school districts. In March 2010, Sunshine Review launched the Sunny Awards just prior to Sunshine Week to recognize the 39 local government websites that had scored an A on their checklist. By the time of the 2011 Sunny Awards, those who qualified had more than doubled, with the organization handing out 112 awards to state and local government websites. In 2012 the number of awards had increased yet again, with the organization handing out 214 awards to state government and other localities.

=== Response ===
St. Charles Parish, Louisiana reported redoing its website partly in response to the critique on Sunshine Review. Dupage County, Illinois promised to add county contracts to its website. Champaign County, Illinois was recognized by a local newspaper for its informative website based on Sunshine Review's evaluation of the county's website.

Other local government has also upgraded their websites to receive perfect grades on Sunshine Review's checklist including Tulsa County, Owasso City, Carbondale and Anderson County.

School districts in Florida including St. Johns, St. Lucie Public Schools, and School District of Palm Beach County upgraded their websites to address Florida Sunshine Laws as well as to receive perfect grades contributing to Florida coming out ahead in 2012.

Sunshine Review was credited with inspiring Cook County, Illinois to post its checkbook register online.

== Salary records project ==
In 2011, Sunshine Review chose 152 local governments as the focus of research on public employee salaries. The editors of Sunshine Review selected eight states with relevant political contexts (listed alphabetically):

1. California
2. Florida
3. Illinois
4. Michigan
5. New Jersey
6. Pennsylvania
7. Texas
8. Wisconsin

Within these states, the editors of Sunshine Review focused on the most populous cities, counties, and school districts, as well as the emergency services entities within these governments. The purpose of this selection was to develop articles on governments affecting the most citizens.

The salary information garnered from these states were a combination of existing online resources and state sunshine laws requests sent out to the governments. The report found that California had the most employees earning over 150k, with Illinois a close second.

== FOIAchat ==
In an effort to create a conversation between public records advocates, Sunshine Review launched FOIAchat on Twitter. The weekly conversation has included Pulitzer Prize–winning journalists, including Ryan Gabrielson, to answer questions about public records requests.
