= Streamlining Energy Efficiency for Schools Act =

Streamlining Energy Efficiency for Schools Act of 2014
- Long title: To amend the Energy Policy and Conservation Act to establish the Office of Energy Efficiency and Renewable Energy as the lead Federal agency for coordinating Federal, State, and local assistance provided to promote the energy retrofitting of schools.
- Announced in: the 113th United States Congress
- Sponsored by: Rep. Matthew A. Cartwright (D, PA-17)
- Number of co-sponsors: 18

Codification
- U.S.C. sections affected: 20 U.S.C. § 7801, 42 U.S.C. § 6371a, 10 U.S.C. § 2164, 20 U.S.C. § 1059c, 25 U.S.C. § 2511, and others.
- Agencies affected: Assistant Secretary for Energy Efficiency and Renewable Energy, United States Department of Agriculture, Internal Revenue Service, United States Environmental Protection Agency, United States Congress, United States Department of Energy, Bureau of Indian Affairs, United States Department of the Treasury, United States Department of Education
- Authorizations of appropriations: an unlimited amount for each of fiscal years 2015, 2016, 2017, 2018 and 2019

Legislative history
- Introduced in the House as H.R. 4092 by Rep. Matthew A. Cartwright (D, PA-17) on February 26, 2014; Committee consideration by United States House Committee on Energy and Commerce, United States House Energy Subcommittee on Energy and Power

The Streamlining Energy Efficiency for Schools Act of 2014 (H.R. 4092) is a bill that would require the United States Department of Energy to establish a centralized clearinghouse to disseminate information on federal programs, incentives, and mechanisms for financing energy-efficient retrofits and upgrades at schools. The bill would require the DOE to collect the data from all federal agencies and store it in one place online.

The bill was introduced into the United States House of Representatives during the 113th United States Congress, passed, and passed the four subsequent biennial Congresses, but it's never made its way out of Senate committees.

== Provisions of the bill ==
This summary is based largely on the summary provided by the Congressional Research Service, a public domain source.

The Streamlining Energy Efficiency for Schools Act of 2014 would amend the Energy Policy and Conservation Act to direct the United States Secretary of Energy (DOE), acting through the Office of Energy Efficiency and Renewable Energy, to act as the lead federal agency for coordinating and disseminating information on existing federal programs and assistance that may be used to help initiate, develop, and finance energy efficiency, renewable energy, and energy retrofitting projects for schools.

The bill would require the Secretary to: (1) carry out a review of existing programs and financing mechanisms available in or from appropriate federal agencies with jurisdiction over energy financing and facilitation that are currently used or may be used for such purposes; (2) establish a federal cross-departmental collaborative coordination, education, and outreach effort to streamline communication and promote available federal opportunities and assistance for such projects that enables states, local educational agencies, and schools to use existing federal opportunities more effectively and to form partnerships with governors, state energy programs, local educational, financial, and energy officials, state and local officials, nonprofit organizations, and other appropriate entities to support project initiation; (3) provide technical assistance for states, local educational agencies, and schools to help develop and finance projects that meet specified requirements; (4) develop and maintain a single online resource website with contact information for relevant technical assistance and support staff in the Office for states, local educational agencies, and schools to effectively access and use federal opportunities and assistance to develop such projects; and (5) establish a process for recognition of schools that have successfully implemented such projects and are willing to serve as resources for other local educational agencies and schools to assist initiation of similar efforts.

== Congressional Budget Office report ==
This summary is based largely on the summary provided by the Congressional Budget Office, as ordered reported by the House Committee on Energy and Commerce on April 30, 2014. This is a public domain source.

H.R. 4092 would require the Secretary of Energy to establish a centralized clearinghouse to disseminate information on federal programs, incentives, and mechanisms for financing energy-efficient retrofits and upgrades at schools. The bill would direct the Secretary to work with other federal agencies to develop a comprehensive list of such federal programs and to streamline efforts to publicize them through education and outreach.

Based on information from the Department of Energy (DOE) about current levels of spending for similar efforts, the Congressional Budget Office (CBO) estimates that enacting H.R. 4092 would not significantly affect the federal budget. We estimate that any additional costs incurred by DOE to expand existing efforts to promote opportunities to boost energy efficiency of schools under H.R. 4092 would total less than $500,000 annually, assuming the availability of appropriated funds. H.R. 4092 would not affect direct spending or revenues; therefore, pay-as-you-go procedures do not apply.

H.R. 4092 contains no intergovernmental or private-sector mandates as defined in the Unfunded Mandates Reform Act and would impose no costs on state, local, or tribal governments.

== Procedural history ==
Congress	Short title	Bill number(s)	Date introduced	Sponsor(s)	# of cosponsors	Latest status
111th Congress	Streamlining Energy Efficiency for Schools Act of 2010	S. 3364	May 13, 2010	Mark Udall (D-CO)	6	Died in committee
112th Congress	Streamlining Energy Efficiency for Schools Act of 2011	S. 828	April 14, 2011	Mark Udall (D-CO)	1	Died in committee
113th Congress	Streamlining Energy Efficiency for Schools Act of 2014	H.R. 4092	February 26, 2014	Matt Cartwright (D-PA)	46	Passed House
113th Congress	Streamlining Energy Efficiency for Schools Act of 2013	S. 1084	June 3, 2013	Mark Udall (D-CO)	2	Died in committee
114th Congress	Streamlining Energy Efficiency for Schools Act of 2015	H.R. 756	February 5, 2015	Matt Cartwright (D-PA)	56	Passed House
115th Congress	Streamlining Energy Efficiency for Schools Act of 2017	H.R. 627	January 24, 2017	Matt Cartwright (D-PA)	50	Passed House
115th Congress	Streamlining Energy Efficiency for Schools Act	S. 383	February 15, 2017	Susan Collins (R-ME)	5	Died in committee
116th Congress	Streamlining Energy Efficiency for Schools Act	H.R. 762	January 24, 2019	Matt Cartwright (D-PA)	26	Passed House
116th Congress	Streamlining Energy Efficiency for Schools Act	S. 253	January 29, 2019	Susan Collins (R-ME)	6	Died in committee

The Streamlining Energy Efficiency for Schools Act of 2014 was introduced into the United States House of Representatives on February 26, 2014, by Rep. Matthew A. Cartwright (D, PA-17). The bill was referred to the United States House Committee on Energy and Commerce and the United States House Energy Subcommittee on Energy and Power. The bill was scheduled to be voted on under a suspension of the rules on June 23, 2014.

== Debate and discussion ==
Rep. Cartwright, who introduced the bill, argued that "the bill is a strategic and cost-saving investment to relieve the fiscal pressure felt by schools across the country while bringing us closer to energy security." Cartwright cited statistics from Energy Star indicating that schools in the United States spend $6 billion a year on energy bills, the second largest category of spending after personnel.

ASHRAE, formerly the "American Society of Heating, Refrigerating and Air Conditioning Engineers", supported the bill. The U.S. Green Building Council also supported the bill, saying that it "aims to make important improvements to existing federal policies."

== See also ==
- List of bills in the 113th United States Congress
