= Health Care Compact =

The Health Care Compact is a proposed interstate compact – which is simply an agreement between two or more US states that is consented to by the United States Congress – that places authority and responsibility for healthcare regulation to the member states (except for military healthcare, which will remain federal), and provides the funds to the states to fulfill that responsibility."

The proposers of the compact assert that healthcare is too complex to be run federally; that the Constitution reserves to the states or to the people those powers not granted to the federal government, and that an interstate compact will bring healthcare down to a state level and follow the intent of the Constitution.

In June 2011, the Texas House of Representatives voted for preliminary approval to allow the state to join the proposed interstate compact.

== See also ==
- Patient Protection and Affordable Care Act
- Leo Linbeck III
