= 2018 House Democratic Caucus leadership election =

House Democratic Leaders elected by the Democratic Caucus of the U.S. House for the 116th Congress. Front (l-r): Katherine Clark, Ben Ray Luján, Steny Hoyer, Nancy Pelosi, Jim Clyburn, Hakeem Jeffries, Cheri Bustos. Back (l-r): Joe Neguse, Jamie Raskin, Eric Swalwell, Ted Lieu, Debbie Dingell, David Cicilline, Matt Cartwright, Rosa DeLauro, Barbara Lee, Katie Hill.

A leadership election was held by the United States House of Representatives Democratic Caucus before the beginning of the 116th United States Congress on January 3, 2019. The election determined who will be nominated by the caucus for the speakership election as well as who would occupy other leadership positions within the House Democratic Caucus. The following positions were nominated or elected on November 29: Speaker of the U.S. House of Representatives, House Majority Leader, House Majority Whip, House Assistant Majority Leader, Democratic Caucus Chair, and Democratic Caucus Vice Chair. The Democratic Congressional Campaign Committee Chair, the Policy and Communications Committee's Chair and its three Co-Chairs, Junior Caucus Representative and Freshman Class Representative were elected the next day, and a third co-chair was added to the Steering and Policy Committee by the Leader.

== Nominee for Speaker ==
=== Candidates ===
- Rep. Nancy Pelosi (D-CA), House Minority Leader and former Speaker
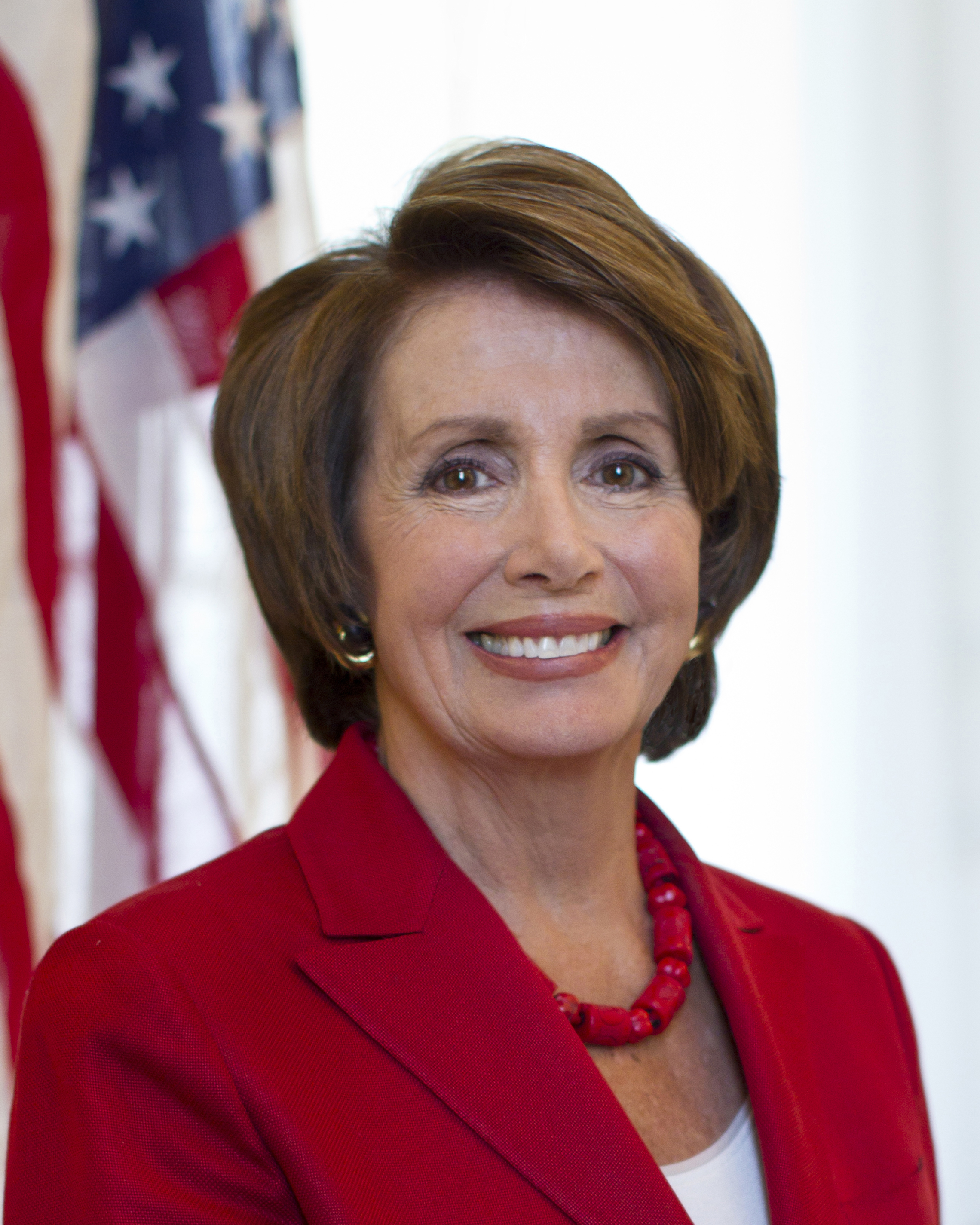
U.S. Representative
Nancy Pelosi
from California

=== Potential candidates ===
- Rep. Jim Himes (D-CT), Chair of the New Democrat Coalition (supported Pelosi)
- Rep. Seth Moulton (D-MA) (opposed Pelosi)
- Rep. Adam Schiff (D-CA), Ranking Member of the House Intelligence Committee (supported Pelosi)
- Rep. Frank Pallone (D-NJ), Ranking Member of the House Energy and Commerce Committee
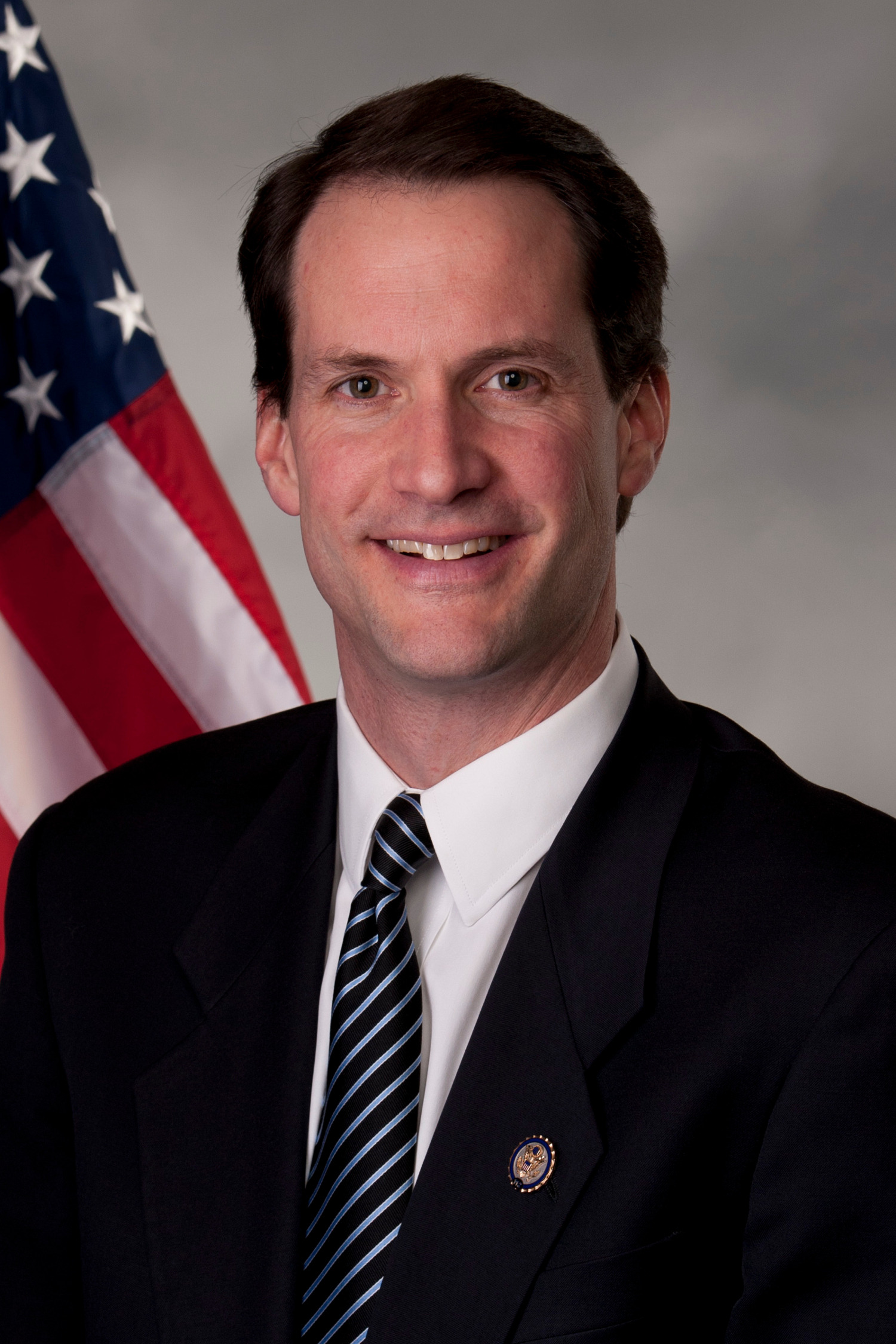
U.S. Representative
Jim Himes
from Connecticut

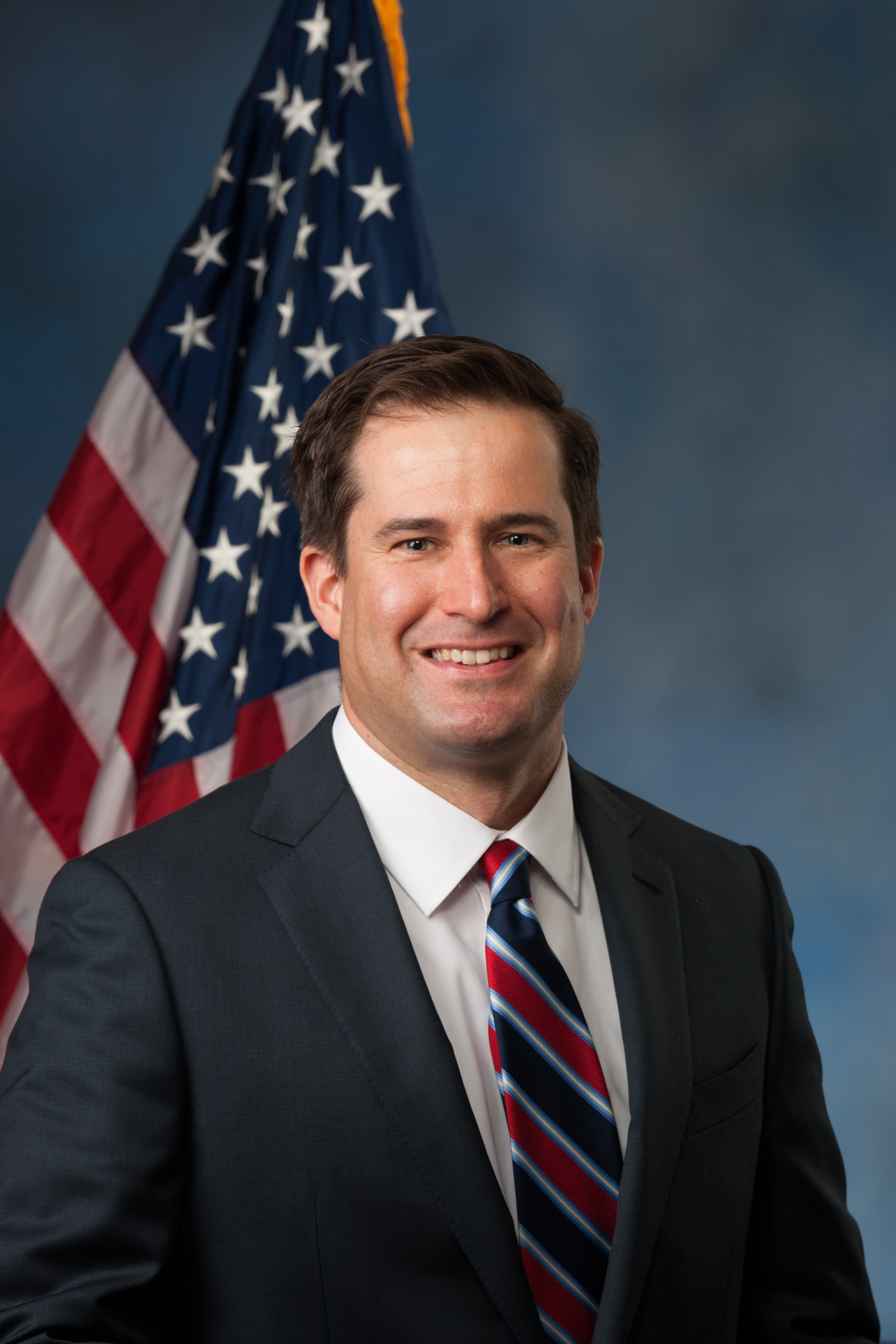
U.S. Representative
Seth Moulton
from Massachusetts

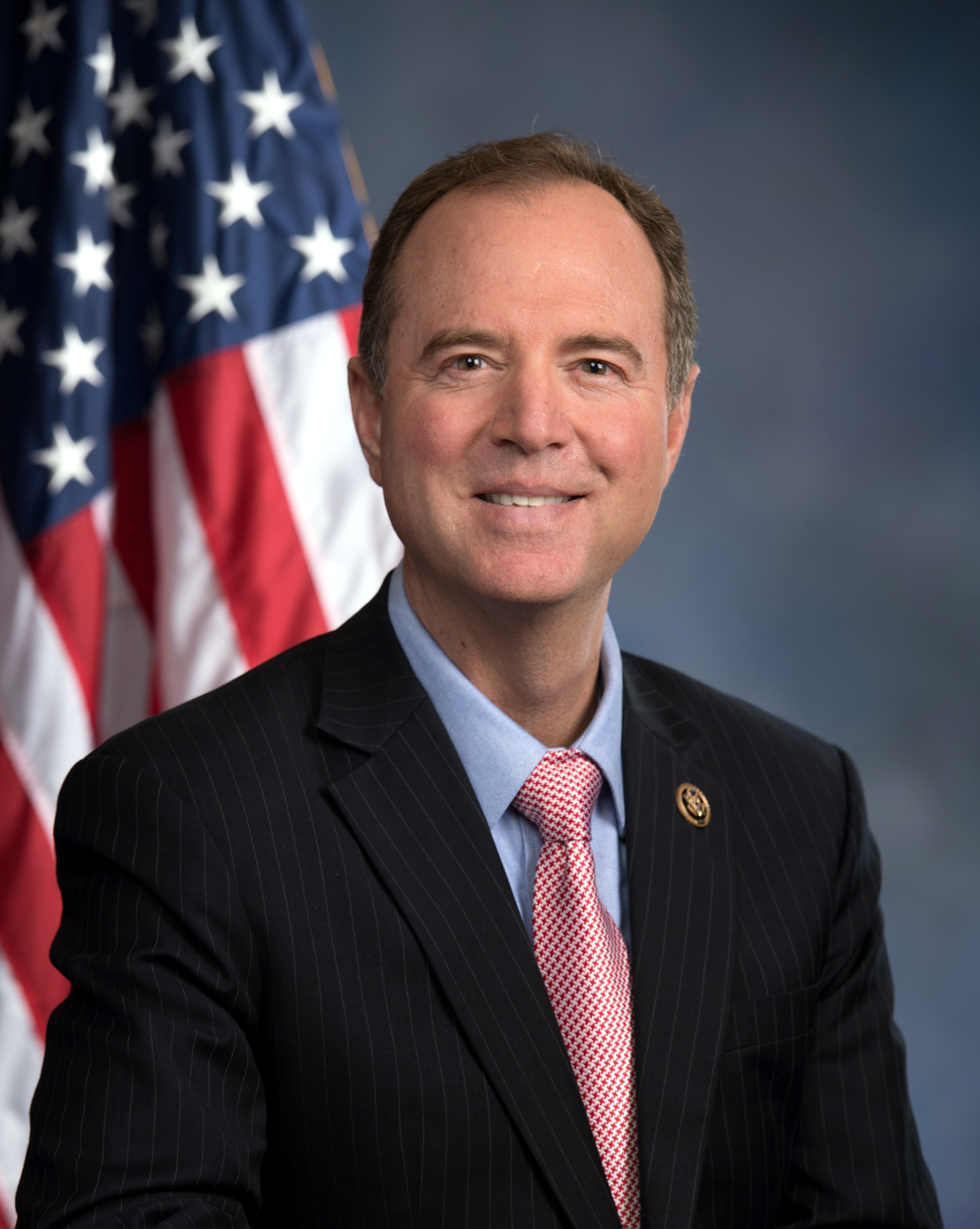
U.S. Representative
Adam Schiff
from California

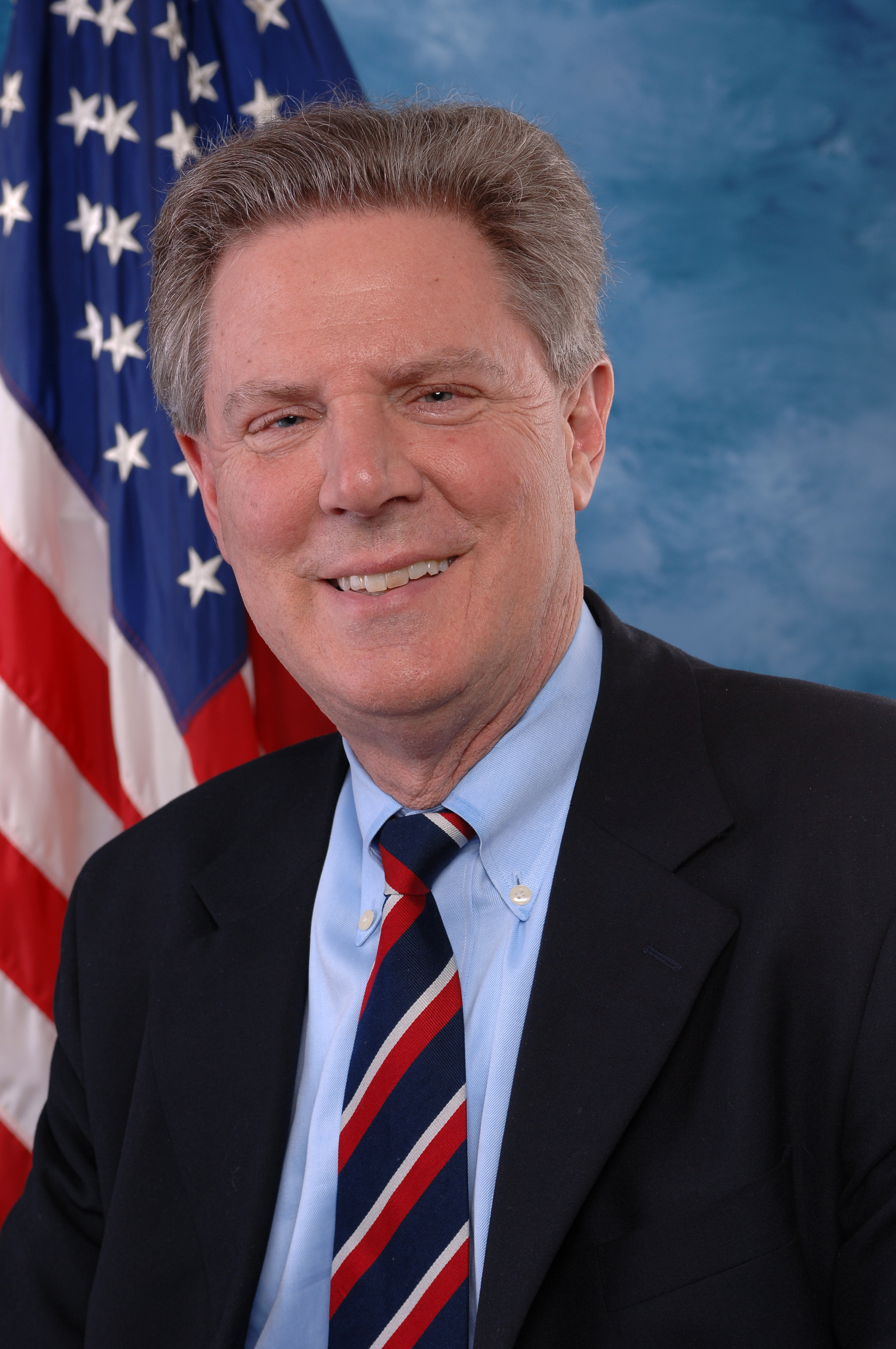
U.S. Representative
Frank Pallone
from New Jersey

=== Declined ===
- Rep. Barbara Lee (D-CA), former Co-Chair of the Congressional Progressive Caucus and Chair of the Congressional Black Caucus (ran for Democratic Caucus Chair)
- Rep. Tim Ryan (D-OH) (running for President of the United States in 2020)
- Rep. Linda Sanchez (D-CA), Vice Chair of the House Democratic Caucus (withdrew from race for DCC)
- Rep. Cheri Bustos (D-IL), Co-Chair of the Democratic Policy and Communications Committee (ran for DCC)
- Rep. Marcia Fudge (D-OH), former Chair of the Congressional Black Caucus and replacement Permanent Chair of the 2016 Democratic National Convention (supported Pelosi)
- Rep. Steny Hoyer (D-MD), House Minority Whip and former House Majority Leader (ran for and won House Majority Leader)
- Rep. Hakeem Jeffries (D-NY), Co-Chair of the Democratic Policy and Communications Committee (ran for and won Democratic Caucus Chair)

=== Results ===
Democratic Caucus Speaker of the United States House of Representatives nomination election, 2018
Party	Candidate	Votes	%
Democratic	Nancy Pelosi	203	84.94%
Democratic	Opposing Nancy Pelosi	32	13.39%
Democratic	Blank ballot	3	1.26%
Democratic	Absent	1	0.42%
Total votes		239	100%

== Majority Leader ==
=== Candidates ===
- Rep. Steny Hoyer (D-MD), House Minority Whip and former House Majority Leader

=== Results ===
Democratic Caucus Majority Leader election, 2018
Party	Candidate	Votes	%
Democratic	Steny Hoyer	Acclamation	100%
Democratic	Absent	1	0.42%
Total votes		239	100%

== Majority Whip ==
=== Candidates ===
- Rep. Jim Clyburn (D-SC), House Assistant Minority Leader and former House Majority Whip

=== Withdrew ===
- Rep. Diana DeGette (D-CO), member of the House Minority chief deputy whip team

=== Results ===
Democratic Caucus Majority Whip election, 2018
Party	Candidate	Votes	%
Democratic	Jim Clyburn	Acclamation	100%
Democratic	Absent	1	0.42%
Total votes		239	100%

== Democratic Assistant Leader ==
=== Candidates ===
- Rep. Ben Ray Luján (D-NM), Chair of the DCCC

=== Withdrawn ===
- Rep. Cheri Bustos (D-IL) (running for Chair of the DCCC)
- Rep. David Cicilline (D-RI), Co-Chair of the Democratic Policy and Communications Committee (running for Chair of the DPCC)

=== Results ===
Democratic Caucus Assistant Majority Leader election, 2018
Party	Candidate	Votes	%
Democratic	Ben Ray Luján	Acclamation	100%
Democratic	Absent	1	0.42%
Total votes		239	100%

== Democratic Caucus Chair ==
=== Candidates ===
- Rep. Barbara Lee (D-CA), former Co-Chair of the Congressional Progressive Caucus and Chair of the Congressional Black Caucus
- Rep. Hakeem Jeffries (D-NY), Co-Chair of the Democratic Policy and Communications Committee and member of the Congressional Progressive Caucus

=== Withdrawn ===
- Rep. Linda Sanchez (D-CA), Vice Chair of the House Democratic Caucus (withdrew after husband's federal indictment)

=== Endorsements ===
Barbara Lee

U.S. representatives

- Rep. Raúl Grijalva (D-AZ)
- Rep. Bobby Scott (D-VA)
- Rep. Bennie Thompson (D-MS)
- Rep. Joaquín Castro (D-TX)
- Rep. John Lewis
- Rep. Ro Khanna
- Rep. G. K. Butterfield (D-NC)
- Rep. Marcia Fudge (D-OH)
- Rep. Emanuel Cleaver (D-MO)
- Rep. Adam Smith (D-WA)
- Rep. Rosa DeLauro (D-CT)
- Rep. Sheila Jackson Lee (D-TX)

Organizations

- National Organization for Women
- Indivisible movement
- Color of Change
- NARAL Pro-Choice America
- Feminist Majority Foundation

Individuals

- Cecile Richards, former President and CEO of Planned Parenthood
- Ady Barkan, activist

=== Results ===
Democratic Caucus Chair election, 2018
Party	Candidate	Votes	%
Democratic	Hakeem Jeffries	123	51.46%
Democratic	Barbara Lee	113	47.28%
Democratic	Absent	1	0.42%
Total votes		239	100%

== Democratic Caucus Vice Chair ==
=== Candidates ===
- Rep. Katherine Clark (D-MA), DCCC Recruitment Vice Chair and member of the Congressional Progressive Caucus
- Rep. Pete Aguilar (D-CA), Congressional Hispanic Caucus Whip and member of the New Democrat Coalition

=== Results ===
Democratic Caucus Vice-Chair election, 2018
Party	Candidate	Votes	%
Democratic	Katherine Clark	144	60.25%
Democratic	Pete Aguilar	90	37.66%
Democratic	Absent	5	2.09%
Total votes		234	100%

== DCCC Chair ==
=== Candidates ===
- Rep. Cheri Bustos (D-IL), Co-Chair of the Democratic Policy and Communications Committee and DCCC "Heartland Engagement" Chair
- Rep. Denny Heck (D-WA), DCCC Recruitment Chair
- Rep. Suzan DelBene (D-WA), DCCC Finance Co-Chair

=== Withdrawn ===
- Rep. Sean Patrick Maloney (D-NY) (withdrew due to hospitalization)

=== Results ===
Democratic Caucus DCCC Chair election, 2018
Party	Candidate	Votes	%
Democratic	Cheri Bustos	117	50.43%
Democratic	Denny Heck	83	35.78%
Democratic	Suzan DelBene	32	13.79%
Democratic	Absent	3	1.29%
Total votes		232	100%

== DPCC Chair ==
This is a newly created position of the United States House Democratic Policy and Communications Committee which will rank above the three current co-chairs.

=== Candidates ===
- Rep. David Cicilline (D-RI), Co-Chair of the Democratic Policy and Communications Committee

=== Results ===
Democratic Caucus DPCC Chair election, 2018
Party	Candidate	Votes	%
Democratic	David Cicilline	Acclamation	100%
Democratic	Absent	1	0.42%
Total votes		239	100%

== DPCC Co-Chairs ==
=== Candidates ===
- Rep. Matt Cartwright (D-PA)
- Rep. Debbie Dingell (D-MI)
- Rep. Adriano Espaillat (D-NY)
- Rep. John Garamendi (D-CA)
- Rep.-elect Chrissy Houlahan (D-PA)
- Rep. Ted Lieu (D-CA)

=== Results ===
Democratic Caucus DCCC Chair election, 2018
Party	Candidate	Votes	%
Democratic	Ted Lieu	161	
Democratic	Debbie Dingell	144	
Democratic	Matt Cartwright	119	
Democratic	Chrissy Houlahan	107	
Democratic	Adriano Espaillat	90	
Democratic	John Garamendi	44	
Total votes			100%

== Junior Caucus Representative ==
=== Candidates ===
- Rep. Jamie Raskin (D-MD)
- Rep. Terri Sewell (D-AL)

=== Results ===
Democratic Caucus Junior Caucus Representative election, 2018
Party	Candidate	Votes	%
Democratic	Jamie Raskin	65	
Democratic	Terri Sewell	57	
Total votes			100%

== Freshman Class Representatives ==
=== Candidates ===
- Rep. Joe Neguse (D-CO)

=== Results ===
Democratic Caucus Freshman Class Representatives election, 2018
Party	Candidate	Votes	%
Democratic	Katie Hill		
Democratic	Joe Neguse		
Total votes			100%
