= Sam Adams Alliance =

Former non-profit public interest organization

- Type: 501c3 non-profit
- Founded: 2006
- Founder: Eric O'Keefe
- Defunct: 2012
- Fate: Dissolved
- Headquarters: Chicago, Illinois

Sam Adams Alliance (SAM) was a 501(c)(3) non-profit organization based in Chicago, Illinois. It was founded in 2006 and disbanded in 2012. The president was Eric O'Keefe.

SAM launched three wiki-style websites: Judgepedia, Ballotpedia, and Sunshine Review. SAM also helped launch American Majority and the Franklin Center for Government and Public Integrity.

== Activities ==
=== The Sammies ===
Begun in 2007, the Sammies was an annual national awards program designed to recognize "outstanding citizen leadership and creativity." John Stossel of FOX Business was the keynote speaker at the 2011 Sammies ceremony.

=== Market research ===
In March 2010, Sam Adams Alliance released the first of a series of "Activist Insights Reports" titled "Early Adopters: Reading the Tea Leaves," a study of leaders in the Tea Party movement. The study surveyed 50 active leaders in the movement on their motivations for becoming involved. It found that about half of Tea Party movement activists had never before been involved in politics, and that many became involved out of fear of passing on larger government and insurmountable debt to their children and grandchildren.

In August 2010, a follow-up report exploring the Tea Party movement was released titled "Next Wave: A Surf Report."

In September 2010, Sam Adams Alliance released their first "Market Insights Report" titled "Surface Tension: Tea Parties and the Political Establishment."

=== Health Administration Bureau ===
On July 16, 2009, Sam Adams Alliance released a YouTube video named "Health Rations And You." Michelle Malkin featured the project on her site.

=== Chicago Tea Parties ===
In February 2009, a blog posting on the Playboy website suggested that Sam Adams Alliance was involved in Rick Santelli's call for a "Chicago Tea Party." The article pointed out that the ChicagoTeaParty.com domain name where Santelli's rant was posted hours after it aired was actually purchased in August 2008 - five months before President Obama began his term. The Playboy blog making this allegation was removed without explanation within two days of its publication.
