= Campaign for Primary Accountability =

American nonpartisan Super PAC (2011-)

- Formation: 2011
- Legal status: Super PAC
- President: Leo Linbeck III, Eric O'Keefe
- Website: www.campaign4primaryaccountability.org

The Campaign for Primary Accountability is a nonpartisan Super PAC created in 2011. Founded by Leo Linbeck III and Eric O'Keefe, the group's goal is to defeat longtime and unpopular incumbents of both the Republican Party and Democratic Party.

== History ==
In 2012, the group's efforts to unseat incumbents in congressional primaries were featured in The Washington Post, The New York Times, The Wall Street Journal, and USA Today.
