= Leo Linbeck III =

American businessman

- Education: University of Notre Dame; University of Texas at Austin; Stanford Graduate School of Business
- Occupations: Businessman, political and education reformer
- Children: 5
- Father: Leo Linbeck Jr.

Leo Linbeck III is an American businessman who is involved in a variety of political and education reform efforts. He serves as president and chief executive officer of Aquinas Companies, LLC and as executive chairman of the Linbeck Group, a company started by his grandfather Leo Linbeck Sr.

== Education ==
At the University of Notre Dame, Linbeck received a Bachelor of Arts from the Program of Liberal Studies and a Bachelor of Science in civil engineering. He went on to receive a Master of Science in structural engineering from the University of Texas at Austin, and a Master of Business Administration from the Stanford Graduate School of Business. At Stanford, Linbeck was also founder of the Global Management Program.

== Career ==
=== Business ===
Early in his career, Linbeck was co-founder of the Jafy Corporation, a software development firm. He also worked for Nishimatsu Kensetsu Kaisha in Tokyo and Osaka.

Linbeck serves as CEO of Aquinas Companies, LLC. Aquinas Companies has three principal business lines: construction management (Linbeck Group), real estate development (Essex Commercial Properties), and early stage biotechnology development Fannin Innovation Studio (formerly AlphaDev). The Greater Houston Community Foundation owns 30% of Aquinas Companies, LLC.

Linbeck was a founder of the Collaborative Process Institute and the Lean Construction Institute. Linbeck is also the founder of Fannin Innovation Studio, a venture capital operating company, or VCOC, in Houston, Texas.

=== Teaching ===
Linbeck is a lecturer at Stanford's Graduate School of Business. He is a former adjunct business professor at Rice University's Jones Graduate School of Business.

== Education reform ==
Linbeck serves as an advisor to the Knowledge is Power Program, a network of free open-enrollment college-preparatory schools in under-resourced communities throughout the United States. In 2005, Linbeck developed a strategic growth plan to open forty-two KIPP schools in Houston before 2017.

== Political activities ==
=== Competitive Governance Action ===
Linbeck is the chairman of the Competitive Governance Institute and Competitive Governance Action. According to the group's mission statement, Competitive Governance Action "exists to challenge the increasing domination of decision-making in Washington that disenfranchises ordinary citizens, protects incumbents from challenges to their power and position, and allows career politicians to avoid accountability for their actions." The group's efforts include a "Primary Pledge" to encourage citizens to vote in primary elections, support for interstate compacts, including the Health Care Compact, and organization of a coalition to repeal the Sixteenth Amendment to the United States Constitution.

=== Campaign for Primary Accountability ===
Linbeck is the co-founder and top donor of the Campaign for Primary Accountability (CPA), a Super PAC with a stated goal of bringing "true competition to our electoral process, to give voters real information about their choices, and to restore fair, not fixed, elections." According to a Mother Jones article published in March 2012, "the group's aim is to use the power of the purse to do what political parties and state redistricting panels won't—make congressional races competitive again. CFPA, which has raised $1.8 million to date, is targeting at least 10 Republican and Democratic incumbents in half a dozen states, with plans to increase that number over the next few months."

According to the Dallas Morning News, "Most so-called Super PACs created in the wake of the Supreme Court’s Citizens United decision push specific candidates, values or policy positions. But a Texas-based group, the Campaign for Primary Accountability, has a far more unique goal: make life more difficult for more congressional incumbents. CPA is targeting incumbents for primary defeat across the nation, using a bankroll that has grown to about $1.8 million to fund challengers to Republicans and Democrats the Super PAC believes has lost touch with the people of their districts."

In January 2013, Linbeck wrote an opinion editorial in Politico stating that CPA would continue to be active in the 2014 congressional elections.

== Affiliations ==
Linbeck sits on the boards of the Texas Families First Coalition, Families Empowered, the Free Enterprise Institute, the Greater Houston Community Foundation, Seton Education Partners, Pathways for Little Feet, the Holocaust Museum Houston, and the Methodist Hospital Research Institute. He is a member of the University of Texas Civil, Architectural and Environmental Engineering Department External Advisory Committee. Linbeck serves on the advisory board of the University of Notre Dame Center for Ethics and Culture and the Positive Coaching Alliance.

== Awards ==
Linbeck was a Henry Ford II Scholar at Stanford, where he also won the Arbuckle Award. He is a two-time winner of the Alumni Teaching Award at Rice University's Jones Business School. Linbeck was inducted into the Academy of Distinguished Alumni in the Department of Civil Engineering at the University of Texas. Awarded the Max Nathan from the Houston Chapter of the American Jewish Committee

== Personal life ==
Linbeck is married and has five children, three of whom are adopted. His adopted children are from Colombia, Guatemala, and Ethiopia.
