= Ballotpedia =

American nonprofit encyclopedia about elections and related matters

- Company type: Nonprofit
- Website type: Wiki
- Available in: English
- Headquarters: Middleton, Wisconsin, U.S.
- Owner: Lucy Burns Institute
- Founder: Leslie Graves
- President: Leslie Graves
- Revenue: $8.93 million (2024)
- Website: ballotpedia.org
- Commercial: No
- Launched: May 30, 2007; 19 years ago
- Current status: Active

Ballotpedia is an American nonprofit and nonpartisan online political encyclopedia that covers federal, state, and local politics, elections, and public policy in the United States. The website was founded in 2007. Ballotpedia is sponsored by the Lucy Burns Institute, a nonprofit organization based in Middleton, Wisconsin. The website was originally a collaboratively edited wiki, but is now written and edited entirely by paid professional staff. Ballotpedia reported a staff of about 90 as of 2026.

== Mission ==
Ballotpedia's stated goal is "to inform people about politics by providing accurate and objective information about politics at all levels of government." The website "provides information on initiative supporters and opponents, financial reports, litigation news, status updates, poll numbers, and more." It originally was a "community-contributed web site, modeled after Wikipedia" which is now edited by paid staff. It "contains volumes of information about initiatives, referenda, and recalls."

== Parent organization ==
Ballotpedia is sponsored by the Lucy Burns Institute (LBI), a nonprofit, nonpartisan 501(c)(3) educational organization. The organization reported revenue of $5.37 million in 2019. Tim Dunn is a member of the LBI board.

LBI was founded in December 2006 by the group's current president, Leslie Graves. The group is named after Lucy Burns, co-founder of the National Woman's Party. The group is headquartered in Middleton, Wisconsin.

== History ==
Ballotpedia was founded by the Citizens in Charge Foundation in 2007. Ballotpedia was sponsored by the Sam Adams Alliance in 2008, along with Judgepedia and Sunshine Review. In 2009, their sponsorship was transferred to the nonprofit Lucy Burns Institute, based in Middleton, Wisconsin.

On July 9, 2013, Sunshine Review was acquired by the Lucy Burns Institute and merged into Ballotpedia. The Lucy Burns Institute is named after suffragist Lucy Burns who along with Alice Paul founded the National Woman's Party. Judgepedia was merged into Ballotpedia in March 2015.

When actress Regina King won an Emmy at the 72nd Primetime Emmy Awards in 2020, during her acceptance speech she encouraged people to use Ballotpedia to prepare for the upcoming election.

=== Judgepedia ===
Judgepedia was an online wiki-style encyclopedia covering the American legal system. In 2015, all content from Judgepedia was merged into Ballotpedia. It included a database of information on state and federal courts and judges.

According to its original website, the goal of Judgepedia was "to help readers discover and learn useful information about the court systems and judiciary in the United States."

Judgepedia was sponsored by the Sam Adams Alliance in 2007, along with Ballotpedia and Sunshine Review. In 2009, sponsorship of Judgepedia was transferred to the Lucy Burns Institute, which merged Judgepedia into Ballotpedia in March 2015.

Judgepedia had a weekly publication titled Federal Courts, Empty Benches which tracked the vacancy rate for Article III federal judicial posts.

The Orange County Register noted Judgepedia's coverage of Courts of Appeal and the Supreme Court.

Judgepedia's profile of Elena Kagan was included in the Harvard Law School Library's guide to Kagan's Supreme Court nomination and the Law Library of Congress's guide to Kagan.

== Partnerships ==
In May 2018, in response to scrutiny over the misuse of Twitter by those seeking to maliciously influence elections, Twitter announced that it would partner with Ballotpedia to add special labels verifying the authenticity of political candidates running for election in the U.S.

During the 2018 United States elections, Ballotpedia supplied Amazon Alexa with information on polling place locations and political candidates.

In 2018, Ballotpedia, ABC News, and FiveThirtyEight collected and analyzed data on candidates in Democratic Party primaries in order to determine which types of candidates Democratic primary voters were gravitating towards.

In May 2024 Ballotpedia announced a partnership with Decision Desk HQ to provide real-time election results coverage for local elections in the United States.

== Studies ==
In 2012, Ballotpedia authored a study analyzing the quality of official state voter guides based on six criteria. According to the study, only nine states were rated "excellent" or "very good", while 24 states received a "fair" or "poor" rating.

In May 2014, the Center for American Progress used Ballotpedia data to analyze the immigration policy stances of Republican members of the U.S. House of Representatives.

Ballotpedia has highlighted the complex language used in various U.S. ballot measures. In 2017, with a sample of 27 issues from nine states, the group determined that, on average, ballot descriptions required a graduate-level education to understand the complex wording of issues, with the average American adult only reading at a 7th to 8th grade reading level. A Georgia State University analysis of 1,200 ballot measures over a decade showed that voters were more likely to skip complex issues altogether. Some ballot language confuses potential voters with the use of double negatives. Several states require plain-language explanations of ballot wording.

In 2015, Harvard University visiting scholar Carl Klarner conducted a study for Ballotpedia which found that state legislative elections have become less competitive over time, with 2014's elections being the least competitive elections in the past 40 years.

Ballotpedia found that in 2020, fewer state legislative incumbents lost general election seats than in any other year in the previous decade, although incumbents were more vulnerable in primary elections in any year since 2012.

A study by Ballotpedia indicated that 2022 midterm elections for congressional districts were demographically divided by income. Democrats typically won higher income households, while lower income, working class districts favored Republican candidates.

In 2023, the New York Times used Ballotpedia as a source for its presidential campaign graph analysis.
