= Gogebic Taconite =

American iron-ore mining company

- Type: Subsidiary of Cline Resource and Development Group
- Industry: Mining
- Headquarters: Florida and Hurley, Wisconsin, United States
- Key people: Bill Williams, President; Chris Cline, President of Cline Resource and Development Group
- Products: Iron ore
- Website: www.gogebictaconite.com/

Gogebic Taconite is an iron-ore mining company in development stage, based in Florida, with a presence in Hurley, Wisconsin. The company, owned by the larger mining organizations, Cline Resource and Development Group, is at the center of a dispute among politicians, community groups, environmental organizations, Native American tribal councils and various stakeholders because of a proposed mining project scheduled for operation in Iron and Ashland counties in northern Wisconsin.

== Proposed project ==
Designed to produce low-grade taconite pellets used for steelmaking, the project under consideration in northern Wisconsin might yield up to 2 billion tons of ore across the 22-mile long lease property, according to company figures. The $1.5 billion project (in terms of taxable revenue) sits amongst the remote Penokee Hills south of Lake Superior, and most of the initial work is to be done in a 4 to 5-mile section near the town of Mellen, 20 miles south of the Bad River Band tribal reservation in Odanah, Wi. With lease rights covering over 21,000 acres, the project would be the largest open pit iron-ore mine in the world, and requires legislative action in the Wisconsin State Legislature to advance. Hurley, Wi has a long history of mining in the area. Mining began somewhere around 1880 when the first iron was discovered. Both shaft and open mining, like the process proposed by Gogebic Taconite, have been recorded since the late 1800s in the area. Hurley, Wi is more known for its lake effect snow falls, miles of snowmobiling trails, hunting, fishing and local ski hills, but that wasn't always the case. The entire area, both historically and culturally, is an area of both mining and logging. The Hurley High School mascot is the "Midgets" due to a team that went to state that was made up of short players. A mainstay food in the area is the pasty, which was brought over from the English miners to the area in the late 1800s. You will find bars named the Iron Nugget, Freddie's Old Time Saloon, and the Iron Horse Inn which encompass the rich history of the area. For decades in the late 19th century and into the 1920s, the Gogebic was one of the nation’s chief sources of iron. Iron from the Gogebic helped to fuel the industrial boom in the Upper Midwest during these years. By 1930 mining was winding down in the area. The mines began closing in amid a national economy suffering from the Great Depression. The result was widespread economic devastation in the Gogebic Range. The Montreal and Cary mines closed in the 1960s when the steel industry changed from using high-grade iron ore from deep shaft mines to using abundant taconite ore that could be economically mined by the open-pit method. At the time of closing, the Montreal and Cary mines were producing ore from workings nearly one mile deep. The last iron ore from the Gogebic Iron Range in Wisconsin was shipped from the Cary Mine in Hurley in 1965. The mines can still be seen in the historical mining houses along the Carey stretch and Montreal areas. The mining industry sustained the area for 85 years with no known environmental effects.

When Gogebic Taconite began pursuing an iron ore mine in northern Wisconsin, the numbers grabbed both supporters and opponents.

=== Controversy ===
Proponents of the project say that the first mining phase will last 35 years and create 700 direct mining jobs. Opponents question the jobs claim, say that the mine will harm the environment and pollute local water sources, including sloughs where Bad River tribal members hold traditional rice harvests. More recent controversy has focused on the present state of the Bad River that runs within the reservation. In particular, opponents have noted that the presence of iron sulphide in the overburden could cause acid mine drainage. Legislators, including Republican Governor Scott Walker, have voiced their support for the mine, while state Democrats, environmental groups like the Sierra Club, all 11 sovereign Tribal Nations in Wisconsin, including the local Bad River Band of the Lake Superior Tribe of Chippewa Indians, most of the cities in the area of the proposed mine (including La Pointe, Ashland, Bayfield and Washburn), are in opposition even though these cities are not located in the mining zone. However, these towns are within the Lake Superior watershed area and will be affected by the water and air pollution created by the mine. Hurley, which is historically and culturally a mining town and Mellen, Wisconsin were open to the proposal, and would have been the closest towns to the mining zone.

In July 2013, the mine site owners hired armed security to guarantee the safety of the work site and employees after protesters attacked a local woman hired to watch the companies equipment. The Security company hired is "BulletProof" from Arizona, who patrol armed and in BDU's. The company then came to an agreement with local law enforcement and continued to use local residents to monitor property.

On March 24, 2015 Gogebic Taconite withdrew the preapplication notice related to the proposed mine. The site was closed during the application period to the public. Since the withdrawal of the application it is now back open to the public for hunting, fishing, hiking, sight-seeing and cross-country skiing.
