= Public hearings of the United States House Select Committee on the January 6 Attack =

2022 series of congressional hearings

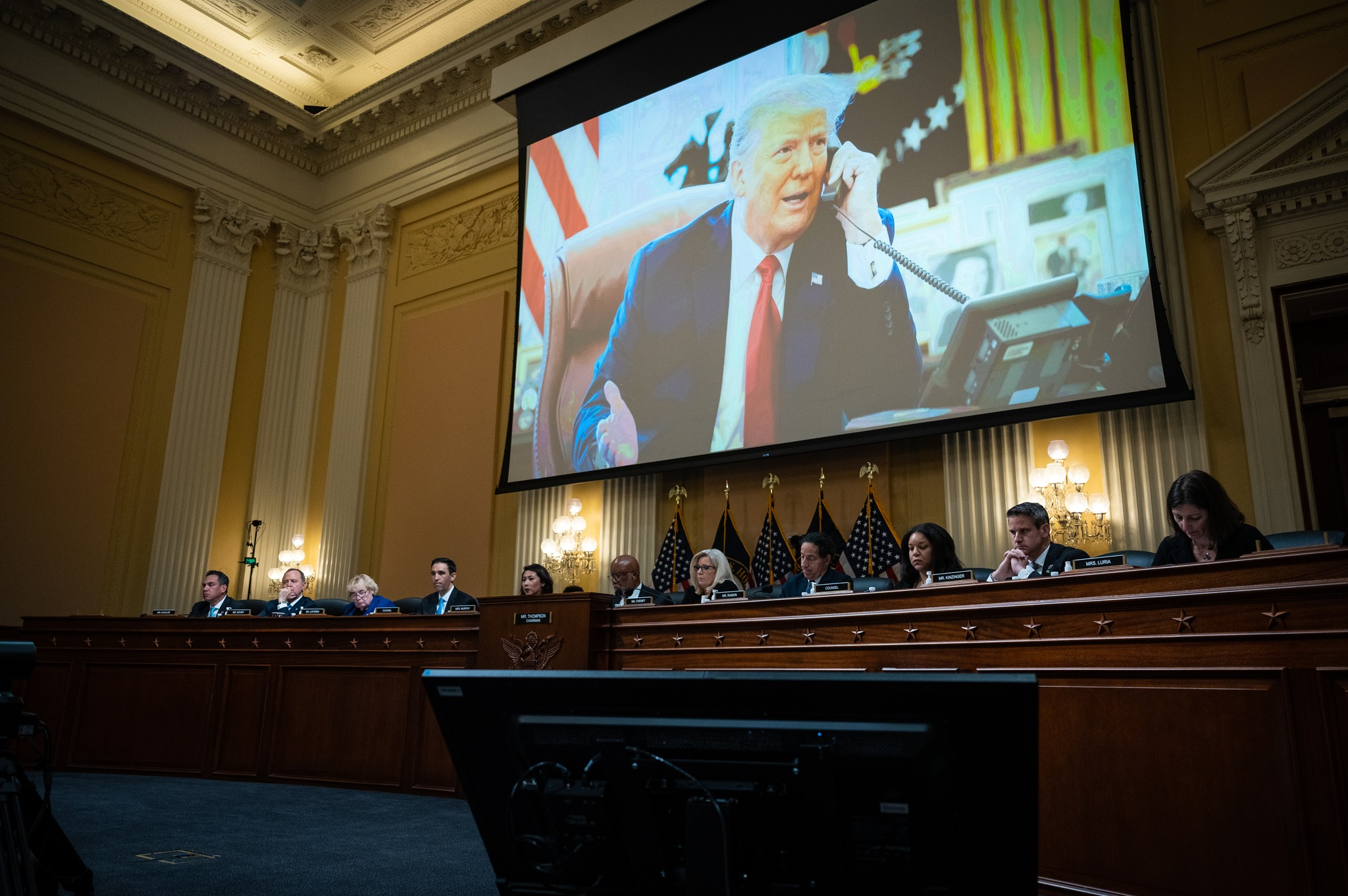
- Event: House hearings derived from the January 6 United States Capitol attack
- Time: June–December 2022
- Place: Washington, D.C.
- Chairman: Congressman Bennie Thompson
- Result: Recommendation of criminal charges against former President Donald Trump

A series of televised congressional investigations by the United States House Select Committee on the January 6 Attack about events related to the January 6 United States Capitol attack ran from 2021 to January 2023.

In July 2021, the House Select Committee held a preliminary public hearing about the law enforcement experience during the mob violence on that day. In 2022, the Committee held ten live televised public hearings that presented evidence of Trump's seven-part plan to overturn the 2020 elections; this included live interviews under oath (of many Republicans and some Trump loyalists), as well as recorded sworn deposition testimony and video footage from other sources. An Executive Summary of the committee's findings was published on December 19, 2022; a Final Report was published on December 22, 2022.

During the first hearing on June 9, 2022, committee chair Bennie Thompson and vice-chair Liz Cheney said that President Donald Trump tried to stay in power even though he lost the 2020 presidential election. Thompson called it a "coup". The committee shared footage of the attack, discussed the involvement of the Proud Boys, and included testimony from a documentary filmmaker and a member of the Capitol Police.

The second hearing on June 13, 2022, focused on evidence showing that Trump knew he lost and that most of his inner circle knew claims of fraud did not have merit. William Barr testified that Trump had "become detached from reality" because he continued to promote conspiracy theories and pushed the stolen election myth without "interest in what the actual facts were."

The third hearing on June 16, 2022, examined how Trump and others pressured Vice President Mike Pence to selectively discount electoral votes and overturn the election by unconstitutional means, using John Eastman's fringe legal theories as justification.

The fourth hearing on June 21, 2022, included appearances by election officials from Arizona and Georgia who testified they were pressured to "find votes" for Trump and change results in their jurisdictions. The committee revealed attempts to organize fake slates of alternate electors and established that "Trump had a direct and personal role in this effort."

The fifth hearing on June 23, 2022, focused on Trump's pressure campaign on the Justice Department to rubber stamp his narrative of a stolen election, the insistence on numerous debunked election fraud conspiracy theories, requests to seize voting machines, and Trump's effort to install Jeffrey Clark as acting attorney general.

The exclusive witness of the sixth hearing on June 28, 2022, was Cassidy Hutchinson, top aide to former White House Chief of Staff Mark Meadows. She testified that White House officials anticipated violence days in advance of January 6; that Trump knew supporters at the Ellipse rally were armed with weapons including AR-15s yet asked to relax security checks at his speech; and that Trump planned to join the crowd at the Capitol and became irate when the Secret Service refused his request. Closing the hearing, Cheney presented evidence of witness tampering.

The seventh hearing on July 12, 2022, showed how Roger Stone and Michael Flynn connected Trump to domestic militias like the Oath Keepers and Proud Boys that helped coordinate the attack.

The eighth hearing on July 21, 2022, presented evidence and details of Trump's refusal to call off the attack on the Capitol, despite hours of pleas from officials and insiders. According to the New York Times, the committee delivered two significant public messages: Rep. Liz Cheney made the case that Trump could never "be trusted with any position of authority in our great nation again", while Rep. Bennie Thompson called for legal "accountability" and "stiff consequences" to "overcome the ongoing threat to our democracy."

The ninth hearing on October 13, 2022, presented video of Roger Stone and evidence that some Trump associates planned to claim victory in the 2020 election regardless of the official results. The committee voted unanimously to subpoena Trump for documents and testimony, and a subpoena was issued one week later. Trump refused to comply.

The tenth hearing on December 19, 2022, convened to present a final overview of their investigative work to date, and the committee recommended that former President Donald Trump, John Eastman, and others be referred for legal charges. The committee also recommended that the House Ethics Committee follow up on Rep. Kevin McCarthy (CA), Rep. Jim Jordan (OH), Scott Perry (PA), and Andy Biggs (AZ) refusing to answer subpoenas. The votes were unanimous. Immediately after the hearing, the committee released a 154-page executive summary of its findings.

== Schedule ==
Early in the investigation, the committee held a preliminary hearing in 2021. It was only carried by C-SPAN and not widely covered on broadcast television. In June 2022, the committee held highly publicized hearings intended for live broadcast. As used by the committee, labels such as "first hearing", "second hearing", et cetera refers to this series of televised hearings.

The committee publicly voted on December 19, 2022, to make criminal referrals for Donald Trump and John Eastman to the DOJ, and ethics referrals for four members of Congress (Representatives McCarthy, Jordan, Biggs, and Perry) to the House Ethics Committee. (The news had previously identified Mark Meadows, Jeffrey Clark, and Rudy Giuliani as likely to be referred.) The committee released its final report on December 22, which became a bestseller.

Hearing schedule
TV series number	Date	Day	Time (ET)	Video	Transcript
Untelevised	July 27, 2021	Tuesday	9:30 A.M.	(C-SPAN; 222 min.) house.gov	NPR; PDFs
First	June 9, 2022	Thursday	8 P.M.	(C-SPAN; 117 min.) house.gov	NPR
Second	June 13, 2022	Monday	10 A.M.	(C-SPAN; 114 min.) house.gov	NPR
Third	June 16, 2022	Thursday	1 P.M.	(C-SPAN; 166 min.) house.gov	NPR
Fourth	June 21, 2022	Tuesday	1 P.M.	(C-SPAN; 163 min.) house.gov	NPR
Fifth	June 23, 2022	Thursday	3 P.M.	(C-SPAN; 155 min.) house.gov	NPR
Sixth	June 28, 2022	Tuesday	1 P.M.	(C-SPAN; 117 min.) house.gov	NPR
Seventh	July 12, 2022	Tuesday	1 P.M.	(C-SPAN; 181 min.) house.gov	NPR
Eighth	July 21, 2022	Thursday	8 P.M.	(C-SPAN; 168 min.) house.gov	NPR
Ninth	Ninth hearing – October 13, 2022	Thursday	1 P.M.	(C-SPAN; 167 min.) house.gov	NPR
Tenth	Tenth hearing – December 19, 2022	Monday	1 P.M.	(C-SPAN; 80 min.) house.gov	REV

== Background ==
On January 6, 2021, Donald Trump's attempts to overturn the 2020 presidential election culminated in a mob of Trump's supporters attacking the Capitol Building in Washington, D.C. The House of Representatives passed a bill to create a bipartisan independent commission to investigate the attack, modeled after the 9/11 Commission, but it failed due to a filibuster by Republicans in the Senate. The House then formed a select committee led by seven Democrats and two Republicans. The hearings are part of the select committee's investigation.

In advance of the hearings, congressional Republicans, including House Minority Leader Kevin McCarthy, began to organize themselves to defend Trump. This messaging presented a challenge for them, in part because they did not know in advance what information the committee would reveal at the hearings. McCarthy spoke to donors on the morning of the second hearing, advising Republicans to ignore the proceedings, refuse public comment and avoid the topic. He suggested their party should instead discuss election issues that could garner more votes, such as focusing on rising inflation or fuel prices. Insiders have said former president Trump was not necessarily pleased with this strategy and felt there was "no one to defend" him.

== Preliminary hearing – July 27, 2021 ==
Full-length video of the preliminary hearing of the Select Committee (source: January 6th Committee on YouTube)

=== Participants ===
Select Committee members	Witnesses	On pre-recorded testimony	On audio-visual exhibit
Bennie Thompson – Chairman, Representative (D-MS 2nd district); Liz Cheney – Vice Chair, Representative (R-WY); Zoe Lofgren – Committee member, Representative (D-CA 19th district); Adam Kinzinger – Committee Member, Representative (R-IL 16th district); Adam Schiff – Committee Member, Representative (D-CA 28th district); Pete Aguilar – Committee member, Representative (D-CA 31st district); (D-MD 8th district); Stephanie Murphy – Committee Member, Representative (D-FL 7th district); Jamie Raskin – Committee Member, Representative (D-MD 8th district); Elaine Luria – Committee member (D-Va 2nd district)	Officer Harry Dunn – United States Capitol Police, Washington, DC; Officer Michael Fanone – Metropolitan Police Department, Washington, DC; Sergeant Aquilino Gonell – United States Capitol Police, Washington, DC; Officer Daniel Hodges – Metropolitan Police Department, Washington, DC	–	Unnamed January 6 rioters

=== Synopsis of preliminary hearing ===
On July 27, 2021, the committee held a hearing titled "The Law Enforcement Experience on January 6th [2021]".

According to C-SPAN, "January 6 Committee Meeting with Capitol and D.C. Police: Capitol and District of Columbia police testified at the first hearing of the Select Committee to Investigate the January 6th Attack on the United States Capitol. Witnesses described their experiences on that day and efforts to protect the Capitol and elected officials. Throughout the hearing, graphic video footage captured during the attack was shown."

The four officers—Dunn, Fanone, Gonell, and Hodges—were given a front-row seat to all of the committee's public hearings in 2022. All four, along with others, received the Presidential Citizens Medal from Joe Biden on January 6, 2023.

== First hearing – June 9, 2022 – Primetime ==
=== Participants ===
Select Committee members	Witnesses	On pre-recorded testimony	On audio-visual exhibit
Bennie Thompson – Chairman, Representative (D-MS 2nd district); Liz Cheney – Vice Chair, Representative (R-WY)	Caroline Edwards – police officer, Capitol Police; Nick Quested – documentary filmmaker	Marcus Childress – investigative counsel for the Select Committee; Candyce Phoenix – senior investigative counsel for the Select Committee; William Barr – former Attorney General of the United States; Jason Miller – senior Trump campaign spokesman; Alex Cannon – Trump campaign lawyer; Ivanka Trump; Jared Kushner; Richard Donoghue – former Acting Deputy Attorney General of the United States; Marc Short – Chief of Staff to Vice President Pence; Mark Milley – General, Chairman Of The Joint Chiefs Of Staff; Jeremy Bertino; Enrique Tarrio – former Chairman of the Proud Boys; Stewart Rhodes – founder, Oath Keepers	Donald Trump; Mike Pence; Steve Bannon; Jim McGovern – Representative (D-MA 2nd district); January 6 arrestees; Robert Schornack; Eric Barber; John Wright; George Meza – member, Proud Boys; Daniel Herendeen; Matthew Walter; Unnamed January 6 rioters

=== Synopsis of first hearing ===
Full-length video of the first public hearing of the Select Committee (source: January 6th Committee on YouTube)

This was the first of the hearings for broadcast on live television and was held during prime time. The committee showed never-before-seen footage of the Capitol attack to provide an accessible and compelling narrative of events for the public.

==== Opening statements by the panel members ====
The committee panel observed that Donald Trump attempted to overturn a free and fair democratic election by promoting a seven-part conspiracy. According to Bennie Thompson, chairman of the committee, "Jan. 6 was the culmination of an attempted coup, a brazen attempt, as one rioter put it shortly after Jan. 6, to overthrow the government ... The violence was no accident. It represents Trump's last stand, most desperate chance to halt the transfer of power." According to the committee, Trump "lied to the American people, ignored all evidence refuting his false fraud claims, pressured state and federal officials to throw out election results favoring his challenger, encouraged a violent mob to storm the Capitol and even signaled support for the execution of his own vice president."

Panel members made reference to a federal district court opinion in which the Judge David O. Carter said Trump had "likely" violated two federal statutes and staged a "coup in search of a legal theory". Rep Liz Cheney read part of the opinion, in which the court said:

If Dr. Eastman and President Trump's plan had worked, it would have permanently ended the peaceful transition of power, undermining American democracy and the Constitution. If the country does not commit to investigating and pursuing accountability for those responsible, the Court fears January 6 will repeat itself.

Cheney urged all Americans to read the opinion in full. Cheney said Trump's efforts were part of a "sophisticated seven-part plan", which the committee hearings would establish.

The Trump administration's seven-part plan to overturn the 2020 election, according to the January 6 Committee
1. Trump had knowledge that he lost the 2020 election but spread misinformation to the American public and made false statements claiming significant voter fraud led to his defeat;
2. Trump planned to remove and replace the Attorney General and Justice Department officials in an effort to force the DOJ to support false allegations of election fraud;
3. Trump pressured Vice President Pence to refuse certified electoral votes in the official count on January 6, in violation of the U.S. Constitution;
4. Trump pressured state lawmakers and election officials to alter election results in his favor;
5. Trump's legal team and associates directed Republicans in seven states to produce and send fake "alternate" electoral slates to Congress and the National Archives;
6. Trump summoned and assembled a destructive mob in Washington and sent them to march on the U.S. Capitol; and
7. Trump ignored multiple requests to speak out in real time against the mob violence, refused to instruct his supporters to disband, and failed to take any immediate actions to halt attacks on the Capitol.

A written version of the above plan was released after the hearing.

==== Trump knew that he lost ====
Many in Trump's inner circle informed the president he had lost and there was no evidence of widespread fraud. According to several video clips of prior testimony shown by the committee:

- A senior adviser to the Trump campaign, Jason Miller, testified that Trump was internally advised he had lost the election. According to Miller, the campaign's top data aide, Matt Oczkowski, told Trump very shortly after the election "in pretty blunt terms, that he was going to lose".
- Trump campaign lawyer Alex Cannon testified he had spoken to White House chief of staff Mark Meadows in November 2020 soon after the election and told Meadows there was no evidence of widespread voter fraud. According to Cannon, Meadows replied: "So there's no there there."
- According to his testimony, attorney general Bill Barr "said that Trump's claims of voter fraud were 'bullshit'".
- Ivanka Trump said she "accepted" Barr's assessment.

==== Rush to issue presidential pardons ====
Cheney observed White House counsel Pat Cipollone and his team of lawyers had threatened to resign in response to an increasingly hostile climate of lawless activity within the Oval Office. Another video clip was then shown in which Jared Kushner characterized Cipollone's concerns as "whining." During his testimony, Kushner claimed that his primary "interest at that time" was to complete as many presidential pardons as possible. Cheney also said that Representative Scott Perry and other Republican members of Congress had "sought Presidential pardons for their roles in attempting to overturn the 2020 election."

==== Attack on the Capitol ====
The committee showed video, much of it never before seen by the public, of the mob charging the Capitol and battling police. The video began with scenes of roughly 200 Proud Boys leading the assault on the Capitol. As later scenes showed a violent rampage, audio was overlaid of Trump later saying, "The love in the air. I've never seen anything like it." As the attack lasted several hours, the video contained timestamps to illustrate the timeline. Documentary filmmaker Nick Quested provided testimony during the live hearing; he was embedded with the Proud Boys on January 6. Capitol Police officer Caroline Edwards also testified live and in-person; she was seriously injured on January 6 while defending the Capitol against initial attacks by Proud Boys and during the mob violence that followed.

Quested testified that he joined the Proud Boys at the National Mall at 10:30 a.m., saying "I don't know if violence was a plan, but I do know that they weren't there to attend the rally because they had already left the rally by the time the president had started his speech." According to Quested, they then walked around the Capitol while taking some pictures and observed a sole police officer at the barricades by the Peace Circle. After suggesting the Proud Boys were doing reconnaissance to spot security weaknesses, Chairman Thompson observed that the Proud Boys chose that barricade and breached it at about the same time President Trump directed the rally attendees to march to that same location. He then said:

Now a central question is whether the attack on the Capitol was coordinated and planned. What you witnessed is what a coordinated and planned effort would look like. It was the culmination of a months' long effort spearheaded by President Trump.

Officer Edwards, who had sustained multiple injuries during the attack, testified that the group of Proud Boys who first approached the police barricades began by shouting rhetoric to turn the police into "villains" and then began their assault. She described in detail her experiences and injuries as police fell back. When asked what she remembers most vividly, Edwards described moving from an area with a relatively small field of view to one where she had her first view of the events unfolding before the Western Terrace.

When I fell behind that line and I saw, I can just remember my—my breath catching in my throat, because what I saw was just a—a war scene. It was something like I'd seen out of the movies. I—I couldn't believe my eyes. There were officers on the ground. You know, they were bleeding. They were throwing up ... Never in my wildest dreams did I think that, as a police officer, as a law enforcement officer, I would find myself in the middle of a battle. You know, I—I'm trained to detain, you know, a couple of subjects and—and handle—you know, handle a crowd, but I—I'm not combat trained."

==== Pence called for the National Guard ====
Chairman of the Joint Chiefs of Staff Mark Milley, in videotaped testimony, said the White House encouraged him to claim that Trump had ordered the National Guard to respond on January 6, even though it was Pence who in fact gave the order. Press Secretary Kayleigh McEnany tweeted on January 6 that former President Trump had "directed" the National Guard to respond. The reasons that the White House attempted to falsely credit Trump for National Guard mobilization remains unclear.

It was always known that Pence gave the order. Acting Defense Secretary Christopher C. Miller had publicly stated so on the day of the attack. As a result, CNN later questioned whether Pence was "acting as commander in chief." Miller gave similar testimony to Congress on May 12, 2021, before the House select committee was formed.

== Second hearing – June 13, 2022 ==
=== Participants ===
Select Committee members	Witnesses	On pre-recorded testimony	On audio-visual exhibit
Bennie Thompson – Chairman, Representative (D-MS 2nd district); Liz Cheney – Vice Chair, Representative (R-WY); Zoe Lofgren – Committee member, Representative (D-CA 19th district)	Kevin Marino – attorney for Bill Stepien; Chris Stirewalt – former Fox News Political Editor; Benjamin Ginsberg – election attorney, counsel to the George W. Bush campaign in Bush v. Gore; BJay Pak, former United States Attorney for the Northern District of Georgia; Al Schmidt, former City Commissioner of Philadelphia	Eric Herschmann; Matthew Morgan – General counsel, Trump campaign; Bill Stepien – Trump campaign manager; William Barr; Jeffrey A. Rosen; Derek Lyons – Counselor to the President for Trump; Alex Cannon – Trump campaign lawyer; Richard Donoghue	Amanda Wick – senior investigator for the Select Committee; Hanna Allred – Trump campaign staffer; Gary Coby – digital director for the Trump campaign; Donald Trump; Maria Bartiromo – Fox News personality; Big Lie Believers

=== Synopsis of second hearing ===
Full-length video of the second public hearing of the Select Committee (source: January 6th Committee on YouTube)

The second televised hearing concentrated on both how and why Trump and surrogates spread false claims of voter fraud in various jurisdictions proliferated following the 2020 United States presidential election.

==== Witness testimony ====
Former US attorney for the Northern District of Georgia B. J. Pak testified. Pak resigned from his position days before the January 6 attack; he later told the Senate Judiciary Committee that the White House informed him Trump would fire him if he did not publicly state his office had found election fraud in Georgia.

Chris Stirewalt, a former Fox News politics editor, testified. Fox News was the first network to declare Biden as having won Arizona in the 2020 election; Stirewalt testified that as the vote count wrapped up, he saw Trump's statistical chances of winning shrink to essentially zero. After Stirewalt defended that journalistic choice, Fox News fired him in January 2021.

Al Schmidt, the Republican former city commissioner of Philadelphia, testified. He had drawn Trump's ire for refusing to publicly announce the city's election results were rife with fraud. He resigned in 2021, saying he had received death threats.

Ben Ginsberg, a long-term Republican election attorney involved in the controversial Bush v. Gore litigation, testified as an expert about why Trump's election lawsuits failed.

==== Subpoena and absence of Bill Stepien ====
Bill Stepien was subpoenaed to testify, but his wife went into labor and he canceled his appearance; his attorney was then to have read a statement on his behalf, but did not. Stepien is a longtime Republican operative who joined Trump's 2016 campaign, later becoming the White House political director, before becoming Trump's campaign manager two months before the 2020 election. He was involved in the Stop the Steal effort, including spreading false information about voting machines despite a staff memo finding the allegations were false. Stepien had provided the committee a deposition under subpoena in December 2021. The Select Committee made ten video clips of Stepien's deposition available following the meeting.

==== Knowledgeable insiders dismiss voter fraud allegations ====
The Select Committee showed several video clips of White House and Trump campaign insiders patly dismissing claims of voter fraud.

- Trump adviser Jason Miller said Rudy Giuliani was "definitely intoxicated" on election night when he advised Trump to lie that he had won.
- Trump campaign staffer Bill Stepien said he disagreed with Giuliani's advice on this matter: "Ballots were still being counted. It was far too early to be making any proclamation like that." Stepien said that Trump's advisers fell into two camps on this matter, and Stepien considered himself to be on "Team Normal".
- More video of Barr's testimony was presented. At times he could not control his laughter at the absurdity of some fraud allegations, such as the "Italygate" conspiracy theory, which claims that satellites controlled from Italy had been compromised and used to attack voting machines, and that former Venezuelan president Hugo Chávez had orchestrated an election fraud scheme, despite having died seven years earlier. Barr testified Trump never gave "an indication of interest in what the actual facts were," adding the president had "become detached from reality if he really believes this stuff." Barr also laughed at the mention of Dinesh D'Souza's recent film 2000 Mules, dismissing the fictional assertions of widespread election fraud.

==== False claims appeared in Trump fundraising ====
Committee member Zoe Lofgren and the Select Committee's senior investigative counsel Amanda Wick described how Trump used false claims of election fraud by a "left-wing mob" to solicit donations for an "Official Election Defense Fund" beginning days after the election. The solicitation raised some $250 million in total, nearly $100 million in the first week. Lofgren noted most election-related litigation had ended within weeks of the election, yet the requests for cash contributions continued. Reuters analysis of the legal language of the email solicitations days after they began showed that donors were asked to register for recurring donations and that donations under $8,000 would not go into a defense fund, but rather to Trump's Save America PAC and to the Republican National Committee, which would have broad discretion over the funds. Lofgren asserted, "Not only was there the big lie, there was the big rip-off." Lofgren later said on CNN that the committee had evidence that members of Trump's family and inner circle had personally benefited from the post-election fundraising, specifically stating that Kimberly Guilfoyle had been paid $60,000 for delivering a 2 1/2 minute introduction at the Stop the Steal rally, though that fee was paid by Turning Point Action.

== Third hearing – June 16, 2022 ==
=== Participants ===
Select Committee members	Witnesses	On pre-recorded testimony	On audio-visual exhibit
Bennie Thompson – Chairman, Representative (D-MS 2nd district); Liz Cheney – Vice Chair, Representative (R-WY); Pete Aguilar – Committee member, Representative (D-CA 31st district)	Greg Jacob – former Counsel to Vice President Pence; J. Michael Luttig – retired judge, United States Court of Appeals for the Fourth Circuit	Marc Short; Jason Miller; Eric Herschmann; Jared Kushner; John Eastman; Ivanka Trump; Nicholas Luna; Gen. Keith Kellogg (ret.); Julie Radford; Richard Donoghue; Greg Jacob – Counsel to Pence; Ben Williamson – aide to Mark Meadows; Sarah Matthews; Chris Hodgson	Donald Trump; Mike Pence; John Eastman; Rudy Giuliani; Jake Angeli; Dan Quayle; Al Gore; Dick Cheney; Joe Biden; John Wood – investigative counsel for the Select Committee

=== Synopsis of third hearing ===
Full-length video of the third public hearing of the Select Committee (source: January 6th Committee on YouTube)

The third televised hearing examined how Trump and others pressured Vice President Mike Pence to overturn the election results. Pence himself was not present at the hearing and did not offer video testimony.

==== Experts testimony on the Constitutional role of the Vice President in the election ====
J. Michael Luttig, a longtime Republican who had clerked for Antonin Scalia and Warren Burger before becoming a federal appeals court judge, testified in-person. Had Pence "obeyed the orders from his president," it "would have been tantamount to a revolution within a constitutional crisis," he said.

Before the hearing, Luttig wrote a statement for the record that Trump and his allies "instigated" a war on democracy "so that he could cling to power." He continued, "It is breathtaking that these arguments even were conceived, let alone entertained by the President of the United States at that perilous moment in history" and that January 6 "was the final fateful day for the execution of a well-developed plan by the former president to overturn the 2020 presidential election at any cost." On the day before the Capitol attack, Luttig had—at the request of Pence's aides—publicly opined that the vice president had no constitutional authority to intervene in the election certification, which Pence cited in his January 6 letter stating he would not intervene.

Greg Jacob, former counsel to Pence, testified in-person. He had advised Pence he did not have the authority to overturn the election results. In his legal opinion, he said, those who wrote the Constitution wouldn't have "put it in the hands of one person to determine who would be the president of the United States". He also said that John Eastman had told him privately that he didn't expect a single Supreme Court Justice would support the validity of the fake electors scheme.

A video was shown of testimony by Marc Short, former Pence chief of staff. According to Short, Pence knew he had no legal authority to overturn the election and had said so "many times" to Trump.

==== Narrative of Vice President Pence and the events of January 6 ====
Former White House lawyer Eric Herschmann had told the committee that Rudy Giuliani privately admitted on the morning of January 6 that Pence didn't have authority to overturn the election, even though Giuliani gave a speech at the Ellipse that afternoon telling the opposite to the crowd. Herschmann's videotaped testimony was publicly revealed for the first time.

According to a timeline presented by the committee, by 2:10 pm the Capitol had been breached and the mob began swarming in. Trump became aware of the breach and at 2:24 pm tweeted, "Mike Pence didn't have the courage to do what was necessary." The committee revealed that the mob, some chanting "hang Mike Pence," came within 40 feet (12 m) of the vice president as he was evacuated from his office to an underground loading dock. Greg Jacob testified the Secret Service instructed Pence and his aides to get in cars, which most did; Pence declined, and the head of his security detail assured the vice president he would not be evacuated from the Capitol without his permission. Pence responded that he knew and trusted his security chief, but that he was not the one driving the car. Jacob said Pence did not want the world seeing him fleeing and giving the insurgents any satisfaction from it. Pence then spent the next five hours in a secure underground location within the Capitol Building complex. The Department of Justice spoke to a confidential witness who traveled to Washington with the Proud Boys and swore under oath that they would have killed Pence and Speaker Nancy Pelosi if given the chance.

The committee alleged that Eastman was aware his "coup memo" and other legal recommendations and political activities were potentially criminal. He emailed Trump's former attorney Rudy Giuliani several days after the attack on the Capitol, saying, "I've decided I should be on the pardon list, if that is still in the works", but he did not receive a pardon. During his taped deposition, he pleaded the Fifth 100 times—reserving the right to avoid self-incrimination—and refused to answer any questions regarding his participation in the attempts to overturn the 2020 election.

==== Luttig warns about 2024 ====
At the close of the hearing, Luttig said:

Donald Trump and his allies and supporters are a clear and present danger to American democracy. They would attempt to overturn that 2024 election in the same way that they attempted to overturn the 2020 election, but succeed in 2024 where they failed in 2020. I don't speak those words lightly. I would have never spoken those words ever in my life, except that that's what the former president and his allies are telling us ... [that they] are executing that blueprint for 2024 in the open, in plain view of the American public.

== Fourth hearing – June 21, 2022 ==
=== Participants ===
Select Committee members	Witnesses	On pre-recorded testimony	On audio-visual exhibit
Bennie Thompson – Chairman, Representative (D-MS 2nd district); Liz Cheney – Vice Chair, Representative (R-WY); Adam Schiff – Committee Member, Representative (D-CA 28th district)	Rusty Bowers – Speaker of the Arizona State House of Representatives; Brad Raffensperger – Georgia Secretary of State; Gabriel Sterling – Chief Operating Officer in the Georgia Secretary of State Office; Wandrea "Shaye" Moss – employee of the Department of Registration and Elections in Fulton County, Georgia, from 2017 until 2022; "Lady" Ruby Freeman – mother of Wandrea "Shaye" Moss, present in person but heard via pre-recorded testimony	Josh Roselman – investigative counsel for the Select Committee; Casey Lucier – investigative counsel for the Select Committee; William Barr – former Attorney General; B. J. Pak – former United States attorney for the United States District Court for the Northern District of Georgia (2017 to 2021); Richard Donoghue – former Acting Deputy Attorney General; Jocelyn Benson – Michigan Secretary of State; Mike Shirkey – Majority Leader of the Michigan Senate; Bryan Cutler – Speaker of the Pennsylvania House of Representatives; Ronna Romney McDaniel – chair of the Republican National Committee; Cassidy Hutchinson – principal aide to President Trump's chief of staff, Mark Meadows; Justin Clark – Trump campaign lawyer; Matt Morgan – General counsel, Trump campaign; Cleta Mitchell – Trump campaign lawyer; Robert Sinners – "fake elector"; Andrew Hitt – "fake elector"; Laura Cox – "fake elector"; "Lady" Ruby Freeman – mother of Wandrea "Shaye" Moss, present in person but heard via pre-recorded testimony	Donald Trump – 45th President of the United States; Mike Pence – Vice President of the United States; Rudy Giuliani; Jenna Ellis; John Eastman – lawyer; Frances Watson – Secretary Brad Raffensperger's chief investigator

=== Synopsis of fourth hearing ===
Full-length video of the fourth public hearing of the Select Committee (source: January 6th Committee on YouTube)

The fourth televised hearing examined a scheme to refuse and return certified Biden elector slates back to seven key states, which had Republican-controlled legislatures. Leveraging the false allegations of election fraud, it was at Trump's "direct request" that the RNC assisted by organizing the fake slates of electors for Pence to certify. The scheme, promoted by Trump attorney John Eastman, came to be known as the Pence Card. The committee presented part of a video deposition of Republican National Committee chair Ronna McDaniel, who testified Trump had called her about helping to further the scheme; Eastman also participated in the call.

==== Trump calls the Georgia Secretary of State ====
Georgia secretary of state Brad Raffensperger, whose phone call with Trump was cited in the former president's second impeachment, testified that his office pursued hundreds of allegations of voter fraud but found no widespread fraud that would have changed the election result. In the end, he found only 74 votes from people who had been ineligible to vote because of felony convictions and only 4 votes in the names of deceased people. There were no votes from underage or unregistered voters. (Biden had won the Georgia election by 11,779 votes.) Gabriel Sterling, Raffensperger's deputy, also testified.

During the Raffensperger testimony, the committee played audio excerpts of the phone call he had with Trump on January 2, 2021, and another call with Frances Watson, the chief investigative officer for Raffensperger's office. Trump told Watson, "when the right answer comes out you'll be praised." Trump is heard to tell Raffensperger he had won Georgia by at least 400,000 votes, though he actually lost by 11,779 votes. He told Raffensperger, "I just want to find 11,780 votes, which is one more than we have because we won the state." Trump repeated a debunked allegation that a video showed a suitcase containing a minimum of "18,000 ballots, all for Biden" brought to a ballot counting facility late at night for counting. Trump pleaded with Raffensperger to find "the real truth" and suggested Raffensperger could be criminally liable if he did not accede to the president's wishes:

Why wouldn't you want to find the right answer, Brad, instead of keep saying that the numbers are right? So look, can you get together tomorrow? And Brad, we just want the truth. It's simple. And—and everyone's going to look very good if the truth comes out. It's Ok. It takes a little while, but let the truth come out. And the truth—the real truth is I won by 400,000 votes, at least. So—so what are we going to do here? Because I only need 11,000 votes. Fellas, I need 11,000 votes. Give me a break...I think you're going to find that they are shredding ballots because they have to get rid of the ballots because the ballots are unsigned, the ballots are—are corrupt and they're brand new and they don't have seals and there's a whole thing with the ballots, but the ballots are corrupt and you're going to find that they are—which is totally illegal. It's—it's more illegal for you than it is for them. Because you know what they did and you're not reporting it. That's a—you know, that's a criminal—that's a criminal offense. And you know, you can't let that happen. That's—that's a big risk to you and to Ryan, your lawyer. And that's a big risk.

==== Surrogates pressured the Arizona House leadership ====
Arizona House Speaker Rusty Bowers testified. Bowers said that Trump had personally pressured him to overturn the state's election results, as had Rudy Giuliani, Ginni Thomas, and John Eastman. Bowers said that Eastman told him: "Just do it and let the courts sort it out." Bowers characterized Trump's scheme as "cheating", since there was "no evidence being presented of any strength" of the claims. He said that participating in Trump's lie would have been "foreign to my very being." He also testified that Arizona Congressman Andy Biggs called him on the morning of January 6, asking him to overturn the Arizona results. Shortly before the committee hearing, Trump released a statement saying that Bowers had privately agreed with him in November 2020 that the Arizona election was rigged and stolen, but Bowers specifically denied Trump's allegation during the hearing while under oath. Bowers testified Giuliani told him, "We've got lots of theories. We just don't have the evidence."

==== Sean Riley "alternate electors" plan for Wisconsin and Michigan ====
The committee revealed a text message sent by Senator Ron Johnson's chief of staff Sean Riley minutes before the vote certification began on January 6. In the message, Riley informed Pence's aide Chris Hodgson that the senator wanted to personally hand deliver information to the vice president about "alternate slates of electors for MI and WI" to which Hodgson replied, "do not give that to him."

==== Impact of false fraud allegations on election workers ====
Georgia election workers Ruby Freeman and her daughter Wandrea' ArShaye Moss testified about their experiences. After the election, Trump and Giuliani amplified a video that was taken out of context, and used the footage to make baseless claims that Freeman and Moss had committed election fraud. The women and their family members were subjected to anti-Black racist smears and death threats and were warned by the FBI that they would not be safe in their home. During her testimony, Freeman said "There is nowhere I feel safe. Nowhere. Do you know how it feels to have the president of the United States target you?" Ms. Moss said that the false accusations made against her had impacted her well-being "in a major way—in every way—all because of lies."

==== Reactions to fourth hearing ====
Fox News anchor Martha MacCallum acknowledged on June 21 after the fourth hearing: "The lack of [election fraud] evidence is the huge stunning clear moment here, where these [Republican] people are saying, 'Look, I supported you, please give me something to work with,' and it simply doesn't materialize." Fox News host Brian Kilmeade similarly said on June 26 that Trump's allies "couldn't prove" any cheating had occurred.

By the fourth hearing, committee members saw an increase in threats against them and were likely to be assigned security details. Kinzinger's wife received a handwritten letter that threatened to execute her, her husband and their five-month-old baby.

A month later, on July 20, the Arizona Republican Party censured Rusty Bowers for reasons "including co-sponsoring Democrat-led bills" and "refusing to work with" Arizona Republicans. They did not directly mention his public testimony at the committee's fourth hearing. The state party had censured other leaders the previous year for criticizing Trump.

== Fifth hearing – June 23, 2022 ==
=== Participants ===
Select Committee members	Witnesses	On pre-recorded testimony	On audio-visual exhibit
Bennie Thompson – Chairman, Representative (D-MS 2nd district); Liz Cheney – Vice Chair, Representative (R-WY); Adam Kinzinger – Committee Member, Representative (R-IL 16th district)	Steven Engel – former Assistant Attorney General for the Office of Legal Counsel; Jeffrey A. Rosen – former Acting Attorney General; Richard Donoghue – former Acting Deputy Attorney General	Eric Herschmann – Senior Advisor to the President; Rudy Giuliani; Cassidy Hutchinson – principal aide to President Trump's chief of staff, Mark Meadows; Jeffrey Clark; Sidney Powell; John Mcentee – former Director of the White House Presidential Personnel Office	Donald Trump; Jeff Sessions; Eric Holder; Michael Mukasey; Loretta Lynch; Louie Gohmert; Andy Biggs; Paul Gosar; Matt Gaetz; Jim Jordan; Mo Brooks; Marjorie Taylor Greene; Bradley Johnson – retired CIA Chief of Station; Christopher C. Miller – former Acting Secretary Of Defense

=== Synopsis of fifth hearing ===
Full-length video of the fifth public hearing of the Select Committee (source: January 6th Committee on YouTube)

The fifth televised public hearing focused on Trump's pressure campaign to influence top Justice Department officials, demanding they investigate election fraud conspiracy theories and rubber stamp his narrative that the election was stolen, despite any factual evidence to support this claim. The hearing additionally detailed Trump's request to seize voting machines in late December 2020; plans to install Jeffrey Clark as acting attorney general were also revealed. Witnesses included Jeffrey Rosen, former acting attorney general; Richard Donoghue, former acting deputy attorney general; and Steven Engel, former assistant attorney general for the Office of Legal Counsel.

==== "Just say it was corrupt" ====
At Trump's request, acting defense secretary Christopher Miller contacted an attaché in Rome about the debunked QAnon theory which alleged an Italian defense contractor uploaded malware to a satellite in order to hack the election results and remotely switch votes from Trump to Biden. The conspiracy theory was relayed by Congressman Scott Perry to White House chief of staff Mark Meadows, who then asked Rosen and Donoghue to investigate on behalf of the Department of Justice. They flatly rejected the request as "patently absurd." The conspiracy theory was also pushed by former CIA employee Bradley Johnson, who was among those who gave video testimony.

Rosen and Donoghue continued to strongly resist Trump's efforts to have the Justice Department announce election fraud had been found, just days after outgoing attorney general Bill Barr had resigned and announced that there was no significant evidence found which could have influenced the election. Donoghue testified that during a phone call with then president Trump on December 27, he was told to "Just say it was corrupt and leave the rest to me and the Republican congressmen."

On December 31, Trump rushed back to Washington, D.C., from his Florida Mar-a-Lago estate in order to hold an emergency meeting at the White House, in which Justice Department officials were called upon to attend. At one point, Trump told them that voting machines had been hacked and the election stolen. Trump then asked "why don't you guys seize these machines?" Richard Donoghue explained that experts at DHS had already investigated and that there was "nothing wrong with the voting machines ... and no factual basis to seize machines." Trump then yelled: "Get Ken Cuccinelli on the phone" and proceeded to insist that it was his job, as the Homeland Security deputy secretary, to seize voting machines. He told Cuccinelli "you're not doing your job." During the public hearing, Jeffrey Rosen testified that the Department of Justice has no legal authority to seize voting machines and that he never informed Trump that the Department of Homeland Security could seize voting machines either.

==== Aborted attempt to install Jeffrey Clark as Attorney General ====
Clark was shown to have provided a "proof of concept" letter, that was composed by John Eastman and Justice Department lawyer Ken Klukowsi, intending that the letter be delivered to Georgia officials. The letter falsely asserted that the Justice Department found election irregularities in that state and others, in an effort to persuade the state legislature to rescind Biden's certified victory in Georgia. In response to this proposed letter, a "contentious" meeting was held between Clark, Attorney General Rosen, and Deputy Attorney General Donoghue, in which Donoghue told Clark: "What you are doing is nothing less than the United States Justice Department meddling in the outcome of a presidential election." When Rosen refused to send the letter, Clark then sought to take over the Department of Justice so that he could send the letter himself.

According to The New York Times it was Rep. Scott Perry who had first introduced Trump and Clark, because of Clark's "openness to conspiracy theories about election fraud" and willingness to do the president's bidding. The committee presented text messages from December 26, 2020, between Rep. Perry and Mark Meadows, that revealed the congressman's role in the attempted scheme that unfolded days later to oust Rosen and install Clark as the top DOJ official.

White House call logs from the afternoon of January 3 showed that officials within the Oval Office were already referring to Clark as the "Acting Attorney General" although not having been officially appointed to the position. Later that day, in a meeting at the White House with top Department of Justice officials, Trump openly considered a move to replace Rosen with Clark, saying "What do I have to lose?" to which Deputy Attorney General Donoghue replied "Mr. President, we'd resign immediately. I'm not working one minute for this guy, who I just declared was completely incompetent ... I'm telling you what's going to happen. You're gonna lose your entire department leadership. Every single one of us will walk out. Your entire department of leadership will walk out within hours."

Ultimately, the effort to appoint Clark, send the letter to Georgia officials, and attempt to decertify election results was averted when a majority of the DOJ Assistant Attorneys General threatened to resign en masse if the scheme went forward. During Clark's video taped deposition with the committee, he refused to answer most questions, and pleaded the Fifth more than 100 times during his 100-minutes-long interview with investigators.

==== Request for preemptive pardons ====
Extracts of a January 11 email sent by Alabama Rep. Mo Brooks were shared. The congressman, who had championed efforts in the House to overturn the election in Trump's favor, contacted former White House chief of staff Mark Meadows with pardon requests for himself, Matt Gaetz, Louie Gohmert and "every Congressman and Senator" who recently voted to reject official electoral college submissions for Arizona and Pennsylvania. White House aides mentioned that Andy Biggs of Arizona, Marjorie Taylor Greene of Georgia and Scott Perry of Pennsylvania had all requested preemptive pardons. Cassidy Hutchinson, an aide to Meadows, previously told the committee that Rep. Jim Jordan also talked generally about pardons for members of Congress.

== Sixth hearing – June 28, 2022 ==
=== Participants ===
Select Committee members	Witnesses	On pre-recorded testimony
Bennie Thompson – Chairman, Representative (D-MS 2nd district); Liz Cheney – Vice Chair, Representative (R-WY)	Cassidy Hutchinson – principal aide to President Trump's chief of staff, Mark Meadows	Cassidy Hutchinson; Richard Donoghue – Former Acting Deputy Attorney General; Max Miller – Deputy Campaign Manager for presidential operations Trump 2020; Nick Luna – White House special assistant to the President; Kayleigh McEnany – Former White House Press Secretary; Michael Flynn – Former National Security Advisor; Matthew Pottinger – United States Deputy National Security Advisor from September 22, 2019, until January 7, 2021

=== Synopsis of sixth hearing ===
Full-length video of the sixth public hearing of the Select Committee (source: January 6th Committee on YouTube)

The sixth televised hearing was dedicated entirely to the testimony of Cassidy Hutchinson, a top aide to former White House Chief of Staff Mark Meadows. Meadows had provided a large amount of documentation to the committee but then stopped cooperating, sued the committee, and was held in criminal contempt of Congress in December 2021.

Due to heightened security concerns surrounding Hutchinson's testimony, the committee announced this hearing only one day in advance. Ms. Hutchinson obtained her own security prior to her public appearance, and the committee enhanced its security for the sixth hearing at which she testified.

==== Prelude to January 6 ====
Hutchinson said that Rudy Giuliani told her on January 2 that Trump and his allies planned to go to the Capitol on January 6. When she reported this to her boss, Meadows, "didn't look up from his phone and said something to the effect of ... 'things might get real, real bad'." The committee also showed prior videotaped testimony in which Hutchinson said the Proud Boys and Oath Keepers were mentioned in the context of planning the January 6 rally, especially in Giuliani's presence. She said that White House counsel Pat Cipollone tried to prevent anyone from the White House from marching to the Capitol and told her personally: "Please make sure we don't go up to the Capitol, Cass. ... We are going to get charged with every crime imaginable."

Hutchinson said she persuaded Meadows not to go to Giuliani and Eastman's "war room" at the Willard Hotel on the evening of January 5, where former National Security Advisor Lt. Gen. Michael Flynn was also present. Meadows, she said, told her he would instead phone into the meeting.

Flynn was subpoenaed by the committee. During his interview, Rep. Cheney asked: "General Flynn, do you believe in the peaceful transition of power in the United States of America?" He pled the Fifth. This video clip was shown at the hearing.

Hutchinson testified that on the day before the Capitol attack, Trump directed Meadows to contact Flynn and Roger Stone, who both had extensive ties to extremist groups like the Proud Boys and Oath Keepers, leaders of which would later be indicted for seditious conspiracy for their alleged roles in the attack.

==== Hutchinson account of January 6 ====
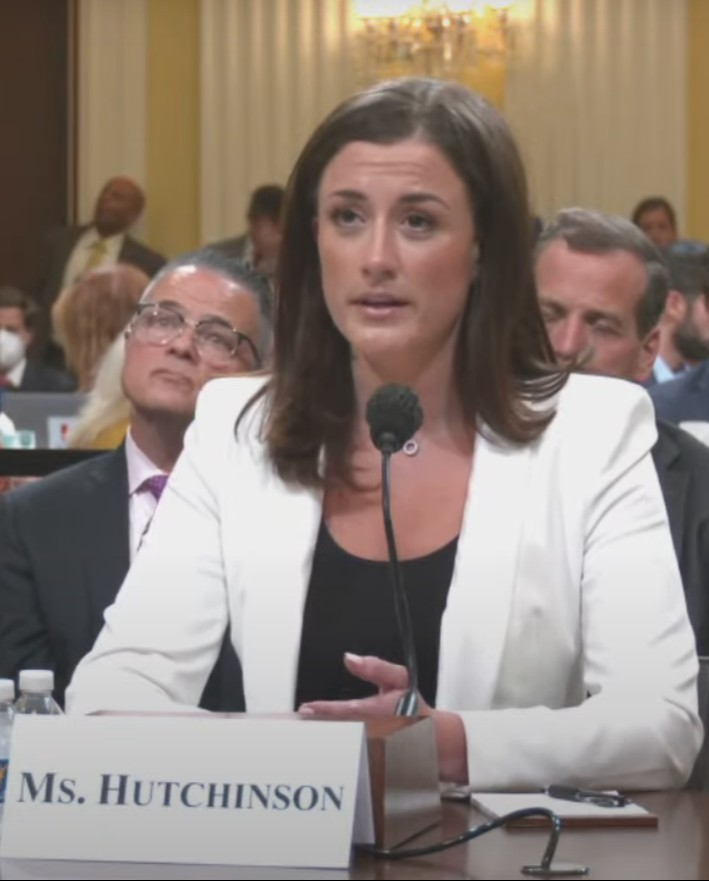
Cassidy Hutchinson testifying before the committee on June 28, 2022

Trump had insisted on specific language for his speech at the January 6 rally. Hutchinson recalled legal advice given by Eric Herschmann, who said it would be "foolish" to include some of the phrases, such as "We're going to March to the Capitol" and "Fight for Trump ... Fight for the movement." Herschmann also warned against making negative references to Mike Pence.

Some people brought weapons, including AR-15s, to Trump's speech, according to police radio transmissions. Trump knew the crowd was armed yet wanted security checks loosened; he specifically wanted the magnetometers removed. Hutchinson, who was present at the rally, testified that she heard Trump say "something to the effect of 'I don't F-ing care that they have weapons. They're not here to hurt me.'" Meadows and deputy chief of staff for operations Tony Ornato were also aware of the weapons, according to Hutchinson. As the mob became more vocal, calling for Pence to be hanged, Hutchinson overheard a conversation between Cipollone and Meadows, in which Cipollone argued that they needed to act urgently to prevent violence. Meadows, however, reminded Cipollone of Trump's current feelings that Pence "deserves it" and that Trump "doesn't think they're doing anything wrong."

She testified that Trump wanted to appear in-person at the Capitol following his speech to supporters. Secret Service agent Robert Engel said it would not be safe to go to the Capitol and insisted on taking him to the White House instead. Hutchinson was told later that day by Tony Ornato that Trump became very angry and insisted he wanted to go to the Capitol. Ornato said Trump grabbed for the steering wheel of the presidential SUV with one hand and lunged at Engel with his other hand, according to Hutchinson. She testified that Engel was sitting in a chair, looking "somewhat discombobulated and a little lost" while Ornato related the account of these events, and that Engel never contradicted the story.

CNN reported three days after Hutchinson's testimony that it had spoken with two Secret Service agents who had heard accounts of the incident from multiple other agents since February 2021, including Trump's driver. Although details differed, agents confirmed there was an angry confrontation, with one agent relating that Trump "tried to lunge over the seat—for what reason, nobody had any idea," but no one asserted Trump assaulted Engel. Politico reported the same day that Engel told the committee during an early 2022 deposition that he had kept his full account of the incident from his Secret Service colleagues for at least fourteen months.

While the committee questioned Hutchinson, they showed brief clips of the videotaped testimony of others. National Security Council records, which identified Trump by his codename "Mogul," also backed Hutchinson's claim that security was loosened, and that orders were made to NSC and Secret Service for "clearing a route".

==== Immediate January 6 aftermath ====
Hutchinson testified that during the riot she wrote down from Meadows' dictation a proposed statement the president might release, instructing the insurgents to leave the Capitol. She said White House attorney Eric Herschmann "chimed in" with his input. The note was displayed during the hearing, and Hutchinson confirming it was in her handwriting. After the hearing, Herschmann said through a spokesperson that he had written the note.

Hutchinson testified that both Meadows and Giuliani sought presidential pardons.

==== Rep. Cheney addresses possible tampering ====
In closing remarks, Cheney expressed concern that some witnesses may have been given messages intended to influence their testimony. She said a witness, whom she did not name, told the committee they had received multiple such messages prior to giving testimony to the committee: "What they said to me is, as long as I continue to be a team player, they know that I'm on the team, I'm doing the right thing, I'm protecting who I need to protect, you know, I'll continue to stay in good graces in Trump world." She quoted another unnamed witness being told that "he is thinking about you", that "he knows you're loyal" and "will do the right thing." Two days after the hearing, Politico reported that Hutchinson was the recipient of the quoted communications, prior to her March 7 deposition, and that the "he is thinking about you" message came from an intermediary for Mark Meadows. Cheney stated that the committee was taking allegations of witness tampering seriously and that they would consider the "next steps" necessary to address the issue.

On December 20, 2022, it was reported that Trump administration ethics attorney Stefan Passantino had advised Hutchinson, who was then his client, to testify that she didn't remember details. Trump’s Save America PAC was paying for Passantino's services, which Hutchinson was not aware of. Hutchinson disagreed with Passantino's advice and switched lawyers before she testified.

==== Reactions to sixth hearing ====
Hutchinson’s testimony was subject to significant national attention. According to Time, "[it] garnered a reaction that no other had received to date. As she exited the hearing room when the committee broke for a short recess, a crowd in the back applauded her." Fox News host Bret Baier said her "testimony was very compelling from beginning to end"; conservative commentator George Conway said "This is the most astonishing testimony I have ever seen or heard or read. You could litigate or investigate for a thousand years and never see anything as mind-blowing as this." The Lawfare blog editorialized, "Cassidy Hutchinson's Testimony Changed Our Minds about Indicting Donald Trump". The testimony was widely characterized by legal analysts and the press as highly significant, particularly in the context of possible indictments of Trump and his associates in the Justice Department's criminal investigation into attempts to overturn the 2020 presidential election. Former Trump attorney general Bill Barr remarked, "the department is clearly looking into all this, and this hearing definitely gave investigators a lot to chew on."

After Hutchinson's testimony, CNN reported that an unnamed "Secret Service official familiar with the matter" said Ornato denied telling Hutchinson about a physical altercation. CNN also reported that the DHS Office of Legislative Affairs would make involved agents available to the committee for sworn testimony, at which time they would be prepared to say the incident did not occur. According to Rep. Zoe Lofgren, "Some of the officers said that they would be coming and talking under oath ... [But] they have not come in" and instead, Ornato, Engel, and the unnamed driver of the president's armored vehicle have all retained legal counsel. (Months later, the committee interviewed the driver.)

Ornato led Trump's Secret Service detail until the president named him White House deputy chief of staff for operations in December 2019; Ornato took an unprecedented leave of absence from his civil service Secret Service position to accept the political appointment. Politico reported two days after Hutchinson's testimony that members of the committee were skeptical of Ornato's credibility due to assertions made in his January and March depositions. Washington Post reporter Carol Leonnig, author of the 2021 book Zero Fail: The Rise and Fall of the Secret Service, characterized Engel and Ornato as "very, very close to President Trump." During an MSNBC interview she stated: "some people accused them of at times being enablers and 'yes men' of the president—particularly Tony Ornato—and very much people who wanted to ... see him pleased." Leonnig said there was a large contingent of Trump's Secret Service detail that wanted Biden to fail and some "took to their personal media accounts to cheer on the insurrection and the individuals riding up to the Capitol as patriots." Two months after Hutchinson's testimony, Ornato, who was then serving as assistant director of the Secret Service, announced his retirement. Ornato then testified to the committee that he didn't remember telling Hutchinson about any physical altercation between Trump and the limo driver. The committee wrote in its final report that it was "difficult to fully reconcile the accounts" from various witnesses regarding a physical altercation, though witnesses agreed that Trump had been angry.

Trump responded by attacking Hutchinson repeatedly on the Truth Social platform which he owns. He disputed the veracity of many of her statements and called her a "liar" and "total phony." With regard to Trump's denials about Hutchinson's testimony, Fox News anchor Bret Baier noted on June 28: "Cassidy Hutchinson is under oath on Capitol Hill. The President is on Truth Social ... [Her] testimony in and of itself is really, really powerful."

On the same day as Hutchinson's testimony, anonymous conspiracy theorist "Q" posted to 8kun, claiming Hutchinson was involved in a plot to disparage Trump. QAnon influencer Jordan Sather called Hutchinson a "plant", writing on his Telegram channel: "Is Cassidy being used as a Trojan Horse to destroy the credibility of these hearings with her obviously fake testimony?"

In response to the sixth hearing, conservative author David French wrote an article for The Dispatch titled "The Case for Prosecuting Donald Trump Just Got Much Stronger." According to The Guardian, "In French's view, Trump demonstrably summoned the mob, knew it was armed and dangerous, told it to 'fight like hell' and tried to march with it." French wrote that "Hutchinson's sworn testimony closes a gap in the criminal case ... Trump is closer to a credible prosecution than ever before."

On the day after Hutchinson's testimony, the Washington Examiner, a conservative publication widely read by Trump supporters, published an editorial entitled "Trump proven unfit for power again." The paper's board wrote, in part, "Cassidy Hutchinson's Tuesday testimony ought to ring the death knell for former President Donald Trump's political career ... Trump is a disgrace. Republicans have far better options to lead the party in 2024. No one should think otherwise, much less support him, ever again."

== Seventh hearing – July 12, 2022 ==
=== Participants ===
Select Committee members	Witnesses	On pre-recorded testimony
Bennie Thompson – Chairman, Representative (D-MS 2nd district); Liz Cheney – Vice Chair, Representative (R-WY); Jamie Raskin – Committee Member, Representative (D-MD 8th district); Stephanie Murphy – Committee Member, Representative (D-FL 7th district)	Jason Van Tatenhove – Former national media director for the Oath Keepers until leaving the group in 2017; Stephen Ayres – Participant in the January 6 United States Capitol attack who pleaded guilty to disorderly and disruptive conduct	

=== Synopsis of seventh hearing ===
Full-length video of the seventh public hearing of the Select Committee (source: January 6th Committee on YouTube)

The seventh televised hearing presented links between then-President Donald Trump and the extreme domestic militias that helped coordinate the January 6, 2021, attack on the Capitol. The committee and panel of witnesses discussed "the rise of the right-wing domestic violent extremist groups that attacked the Capitol and how Mr. Trump amassed and inspired the mob." In addition, the panel described "known links and conversations between political actors close to Mr. Trump and extremists." Committee member Jamie Raskin stated, "Donald Trump solicited the mob; he summoned the mob to Washington ... All of this was targeted on the joint session of Congress." It focused on testimony from former White House Counsel Pat Cipollone, plotting by far-right extremist groups and discussions about using the military to seize voting machines." Jason Van Tatenhove, who served as media director of Oath Keepers, testified as well. The focus of the hearing was connections, including Roger Stone and Michael Flynn, between the Trump administration and militia groups such as the Oath Keepers and Proud Boys.

In new disclosed videotaped testimony, Pat Cipollone described, among other things, an "unhinged" White House meeting which took place on December 18, 2020, between himself, Trump, Sidney Powell, Michael Flynn and Patrick M. Byrne, who he named as members of an outside group pushing election conspiracy theories, and that they exhibited a "general disregard for backing what you actually say with facts." Cipollone testified that during the meeting, a draft executive order which would've directed the U.S. military to seize voting machines was discussed. A former Twitter employee who testified on anonymity also testified that Twitter, which Trump used to help organize the rally, “relished in the knowledge that they were also the favorite and most used service of the former president and enjoyed having that sort of power within the social media ecosystem” and that he was concerned about Trump's December 19, 2020, tweet which encouraged people to come to the "Big protest in D.C. on January 6th." This tweet would lead to further solicitation of the January 6 rally on extremist Internet sources and right wing media. One notable example came from Kelly Meggs, the head of the Florida Oath Keepers, who posted a message on Facebook pledging that his group would "work together" with the Three Percenters and Proud Boys, two other right-wing extremist groups, just hours after the tweet was posted. Trump was also revealed to have posted the tweet not long after a meeting with Powell, Flynn and Rudy Giuliani had concluded.

In videotaped testimony, former White House officials testified about an extremist rally which was held outside the White House at Freedom Plaza the night before the U.S. Capitol attack, which Sarah Matthews described as bringing Trump a good mood. In their videotaped testimonies, former Secretary of Labor Eugene Scalia and Ivanka Trump stated that they called on Trump to concede the election after the Electoral College votes were cast in respective states on December 14, 2020, but were ignored. Documented draft speeches were also revealed showing that Trump had in fact edited his January 6, 2021, Ellipse speech as well, to include negative words towards Vice President Mike Pence. Important information about Roger Stone's direct links to Proud Boys, which included encrypted chats with the Proud Boys Florida leader and video evidence showing him appear with members and reciting the Proud Boys' "Fraternity Creed", would be revealed as well. Kellye SoRelle, a lawyer who assists the Oath Keepers and a volunteer attorney for the Trump campaign, named Stone, Info War's Alex Jones, and pro-Trump organizer Ali Alexander as the people who organized the January 2021 Stop the Steal rallies. Footage of Stone, Jones, Alexander and Michael Flynn speaking at the January 5, 2021, Freedom Plaza rally were shown as well.

Jason Van Tatenhove, who was first hired by the Oath Keepers in 2014, gave live testimony about the group's radicalization and how Stewart Rhodes, the group's founder, used conspiracy theories to increase membership and funding, stating that Oath Keepers drifted "further and further right—into the alt-right world, into White nationalists and even straight-up racists and it came to a point where I could no longer continue to work for them". He said he finally decided to leave the group was when he heard members talking about how the Holocaust was not real.

A text message which rally organizer Kylie Kremer sent to election conspiracy theorist Mike Lindell on January 4, 2021, and which was made public during the hearing, revealed that Trump would "call for [the march] unexpectedly" but they didn't want word to get out in advance in order to avoid a countermarch. During his live testimony, Ohio resident Stephen Ayres, who participated in the riot despite not being affiliated with any extremist organization, noted how Trump "got everybody riled up, told everybody to head on down" and that "We basically were just following what he said." Ayres also stated that he did not plan to go to the U.S. Capitol until Trump encouraged the Ellipse crowd to do so.

In her closing statement, Liz Cheney stated that Donald Trump attempted to contact an unidentified witness who has yet to appear in the hearings, hinting at the possibility of witness tampering: "That person declined to answer or respond to President Trump's call, and instead alerted their lawyer to the call. Their lawyer alerted us. And this committee has supplied that information to the Department of Justice."

== Eighth hearing – July 21, 2022 – Primetime ==
=== Participants ===
Select Committee members	Witnesses	In pre-recorded testimony	In audio visual exhibits
Bennie Thompson – Chairman, Representative (D-MS 2nd district) (Note: Participated remotely due to testing positive for COVID-19.); Liz Cheney – Vice Chair, Representative (R-WY); Adam Kinzinger – Committee member, (R-Ill 16th district); Elaine Luria – Committee member (D-Va 2nd district)	Sarah Matthews – Former Deputy Press Secretary in the President Trump Administration; Matthew Pottinger – Former National Security Aide in the President Trump Administration	Marc Short - former Chief of Staff to Vice President Mike Pence, in video; Jared Kushner - in video; Julia Radford - former Ivanka Trump chief of staff, in video; Nicholas Luna - Former assistant to President Donald Trump, voice only; Eric Herschmann - former White House Senior Advisor, in video.; Mark Milley - General, Chairman Joint Chiefs of Staff, voice only; Judd Deere - former White House Deputy Press Secretary, in video; Kayleigh McEnany - Former White House Press Secretary, in video; Stephen Ayres - Pleaded guilty to charges related to January 6, in a recorded video from a previous January 6th hearing.; Tim Murtaugh - former Trump campaign communications director, voice only; Pat Cipollone - former White House Counsel, in video; Greg Jacob - former counsel to Vice President Pence, in video; Mark Robinson - Retired DC Metropolitan Police officer, in video; Unnamed White House security official - voice only; Jason Miller - in video; Eugene Scalia - former Secretary of Labor, in video; Keith Kellogg - General, Former National Security Advisor to the Vice President, in video; Cassidy Hutchinson - former aide to Mark Meadows, in video, and in video from previous January 6th hearing.; Janet Buhler - Pleaded guilty to charges related to January 6, in video; Stephen Ayres - Pleaded guilty to charges related to January 6, in video; Donald Trump Jr - voice only; Molly Michael - former executive assistant to the President, in video	Kevin McCarthy - voice only in Fox News interviews conducted live on Jan 6, voice only in an interview conducted live on January 6 with CBSN, in a video taken in the house late on January 6, and a in taped phone call.; Tim Murtaugh - written communications in text conversation with Matthew Wolking; Matthew Wolking - written communications in text conversation with Tim Murtaugh; Mark Meadows - written communications in separate text conversation with Donald Trump Jr, and Sean Hannity.; Donald Trump Jr - written communications in text conversation with Mark Meadows; Steve Bannon - voice only interview with Mother Jones.; Jaime Herrera Beutler (R-WA) - voice only in an interview with WTHR TV news; Mitch McConnell (R-KY) - Heard in shared video from a secure location taken on January 6, heard in a video taken 13th February 2021.; Chip Roy (R-TX) - in a video recorded in the house late on January 6.; Rudy Guiliani - voice only in a recorded voicemail to others.; Donald Trump - in recorded footage made as part of his response to January 6, in recorded footage of his actions and words on January 6.; Christopher Miller - Former Acting Secretary of Defense, heard on phone call with politicians in secure location.; Chuck Schumer (D-NY) - Voice heard in video taken from a secure location taken on January 6.; Joe Biden - as President Elect, in recorded video distributed on January 6.; Mike Gallagher (R-WI) - shown in video he recorded and published to Twitter on January 6.; Jessica Watkins - facing charged related to January 6, voice only interview with "Stop the Seal J6" channel on Zello; Sean Hannity - written communications in a text message to Mark Meadows.; Josh Hawley - seen fleeing the January 6th participants.; Tommy Tuberville - interview on WKRG news after January 6th; Mick Mulvaney - written communication in a text message to Mark Meadows.; Laura Ingraham - written communication in a text message to Mark Meadows.; Brian Kilmeade - written communication in a text message to Mark Meadows.; Peter Welch - contemporaneous video recording made by him during January 6.; Unnamed Secret Service agents - in contemporaneous audio recordings on January 6; Unnamed man present for interview on January 6 on Fox News; Unnamed January 6th participants, Capitol visitors or staff - shown or heard in various contemporaneous recordings.

=== Synopsis of eighth hearing ===
Full-length video of the eighth public hearing of the Select Committee (source: January 6 Committee on YouTube)

The eighth televised hearing was held July 21, 2022, at 8 pm Eastern time, after being postponed from the original date of July 14, 2022. It was two hours and 48 minutes and was broadcast on prime time television. It outlined efforts to pressure Vice President Pence to reject Electoral College votes from a handful of states that gave Joe Biden his election victory. This hearing shared information revealed by Pat Cipollone during testimony. More video testimony was also featured from Trump's former Secretary of Labor Eugene Scalia, who was revealed to have written a memo which requested a Cabinet meeting following the January 6, 2021, attack. While he regarded Trump's actions to be "harmful," Scalia told the committee that he opted not to resign because he "thought that trying to work within the administration to steady the ship was likely to have greater value than resigning." It also featured video testimony from Sgt. Mark Robinson, a former MPD police officer who was assigned to the presidential motorcade's lead TS vehicle on January 6, 2021. Robinson stated that he was told firsthand that Trump got into a "heated discussion" about wanting to go to the U.S. Capitol.

Sarah Matthews, deputy press secretary in the Trump White House, and Matthew Pottinger, who served on the National Security Council, testified in person. Both had resigned shortly after the attack on the Capitol. Evidence and details were presented of Trump's refusal to call off the attack, in spite of numerous pleas from officials, for hours. Never-before-seen footage of Trump's January 7, 2021, speech criticizing the January 6 attack was also released which revealed Trump's hesitance to make the speech as it was written. Former White House advisor, as well as Trump son-in-law, Jared Kushner stated in videotaped testimony that House of Representatives leader Kevin McCarthy pleaded for White House intervention during a January 6 phone call and that he thought McCarthy was "scared." A newly disclosed January 6 text message between Donald Trump Jr. and Mark Meadows revealed that Trump Jr. wanted his father to "condemn this shit" and "go to the mattresses," a film reference which Trump Jr. claimed during video testimony he thought meant "go all in." Committee Vice Chair Liz Cheney stated, "Every American must consider this ... Can a president who is willing to make the choices Donald Trump made during the violence of Jan. 6 ever be trusted with any position of authority in our great nation again?". Committee Chair Thompson said, "If there is no accountability for Jan. 6, for every part of this scheme, I fear that we will not overcome the ongoing threat to our democracy ... There must be stiff consequences for those responsible."

At the end of the hearing, Cheney said, "In the course of these hearings, we have received new evidence, and new witnesses have bravely stepped forward ... Doors have opened. New subpoenas have been issued, and the dam has begun to break ... We have considerably more to do. We have far more evidence to share with the American people and more to gather ... So our committee will spend August pursuing emerging information on multiple fronts before convening further hearings this September."

== Ninth hearing – October 13, 2022 ==
=== Participants ===
Select Committee members	Witnesses	On pre-recorded testimony	On audio-visual exhibit
Bennie Thompson – Chairman, Representative (D-MS 2nd district); Liz Cheney – Vice Chair, Representative (R-WY); Zoe Lofgren – Committee member, Representative (D-CA 19th district); Adam Kinzinger (R-IL 16th); Elaine Luria – Committee member (D-Va 2nd district); Adam Schiff (D-CA 28th); Stephanie Murphy (D-FL 7th)		Jared Kushner - former White House advisor, voice only; Bill Stepien - former Trump campaign manager, in video; Greg Jacob - former counsel to Vice President Pence; Roger Stone - Trump outside advisor, in video - pled 5th; Jason Miller - former senior campaign staffer, in video; Chris Stirewalt - a former Fox News political editor, video of previous January 6th heating.; Mark Milley - General, Chairman of the Joint Chiefs of Staff, voice only.; Alyssa Farah - former White House communications director, in video; Cassidy Hutchinson - former aide to Mark Meadows, in video; Keith Kellogg - former national security advisor to Vice President Pence, in video.; John McEntee - former director, White House Presidential Personnel, in video.; Douglas Macgregor - former advisor to the Secretary of Defense, in video.; Alex Cannon- former Trump Campaign lawyer, in video.; Matt Morgan - former Trump Campaign lawyer, in video.; Mike Pompeo - former Secretary of State, in video.; Ivanka Trump - voice only.; William Barr - former Attorney General, in video.; Judd Deere - former White House Deputy Press Secretary, in video; Eugene Scalia - former Secretary of Labor, in video; Richard Donoghue – Former Acting Deputy Attorney General	Donald Trump - in video, in audio, and written communications; Greg Jacob - in written memo for Marc Short; Tom Fitton - written communications in an email to Molly Michael and Dan Scavino; Steve Bannon - Trump outside advisor, voice and video interviews with media.; Roger Stone - Trump outside advisor, video footage, and written communications; Amy Berman Jackson - Judge, January 6th defendant sentencing hearing; Kelly and Connie Meggs - in written documents; Mike Pence - former Vice President, in video speech at Federalist Society 4th February 2022

=== Synopsis of ninth hearing ===
Full-length video of the ninth public hearing of the Select Committee (source: January 6 Committee on YouTube)

The ninth televised hearing was held October 13, 2022, at 1 pm Eastern time. It was originally scheduled for September 28 but postponed due to the devastation of Hurricane Ian. The hearing focused on evidence and testimony regarding Trump's involvement in events surrounding the attack of the Capitol, as well as information on the controversial website "thedonald.win", newly released videos of Nancy Pelosi, her Congress members, and lawmakers at their secure location during the attack, newly released videos on the rioters' reactions to Trump's "go home" message, and newly released texts from Secret Service agents demonstrating the awareness and warning signals about potential threats to both Pence and Congress in advance of January 6. The committee was also expecting to vote on its next investigation steps, and unanimously voted to subpoena Trump to make him testify.

Among those shown in video testimony footage were former Trump Administration officials Mick Mulvaney and Elaine Chao. Rep. Jaime Herrera Beutler, R-Washington, also gave video testimony about what she claimed Kevin McCarthy told her about his phone conversation with Trump, which Mulvaney corroborated. Video testimony was also shown of former Twitter employee Anika Navaroli, who was revealed to have previously testified anonymously. Although the committee had already interviewed Ginni Thomas, it didn't feature any of her testimony in this public hearing. Video of Roger Stone was also presented, as well as evidence that some Trump associates planned to claim victory in the 2020 election regardless of the official results. Stone was also shown endorsing "the right to violence."

==== Prior to the ninth hearing ====
The ninth hearing—which the committee had planned to hold since July—included further details regarding "the potential unauthorized deletion" of text messages, particularly those from January 5 and 6, 2021, by the United States Secret Service, which has been headed by Director James M. Murray, a Trump appointee. Inspector General Joseph Cuffari, a Trump appointee, alerted Congress on July 13, 2022, that Secret Service communication records had been deleted, following a months-long delay in reporting the matter. According to The Washington Post, the whistleblowers who revealed this delay said they "shared a concern that Cuffari's office not alerting congressional investigators to the missing records reduced the chances of recovering critical pieces of evidence related to the Jan. 6 attack."

On August 1, 2022, House Homeland Security Chairman Bennie Thompson reiterated calls for Cuffari to step down due to a "lack of transparency" that could be "jeopardizing the integrity" of crucial investigations regarding the missing Secret Service text messages. That same day, an official inside the DHS inspector general's office told Politico that Cuffari and his staff are "uniquely unqualified to lead an Inspector General's office, and ... The crucial oversight mission of the DHS OIG has been compromised." Congress also obtained a July 2021 e-mail, from deputy inspector general Thomas Kait, who told senior DHS officials there was no longer a need for any Secret Service phone records or text messages. Efforts to collect communications related to Jan. 6 were therefore shutdown by Kait just six weeks after the internal DHS investigation began. The Guardian wrote that "Taken together, the new revelations appear to show that the chief watchdog for the Secret Service and the DHS took deliberate steps to stop the retrieval of texts it knew were missing, and then sought to hide the fact that it had decided not to pursue that evidence."

Text messages from January 6, 2021, were deleted from the phones of Trump-appointed officials at the Pentagon after the watchdog group American Oversight filed FOIA requests to obtain the messages. This was not addressed in the July hearings because it was first reported on August 2.

On August 29, 2022, Representative Kinzinger had stated in a Meet the Press interview that the next public hearings would focus on donations Trump solicited for the "Stop The Steal" movement but did not use for that purpose, as well as on the possible Secret Service coverup.

==== Aftermath of the ninth hearing ====
On November 2, 2022, Politico reported that they had obtained some of John Eastman's e-mail correspondences. The series of messages were from December 31, 2020, and had been turned over to congressional investigators, but had not yet been made public. In one exchange, Trump attorney Kenneth Chesebro wrote "We want to frame things so that Thomas could be the one to issue some sort of stay or other circuit justice opinion saying Georgia is in legitimate doubt", and posited that Justice Thomas would be their "only chance to get a favorable judicial opinion by Jan. 6, which might hold up the Georgia count in Congress". Attorney John Eastman replied "I think I agree with this", saying that they needed to "kick the Georgia legislature into gear" in order to favor Trump and overturn election results. The plan was to file a lawsuit and have a pending case with the Supreme Court, thus delaying the Senate's count of Biden's electors. Chesebro wrote that Justice Thomas would be the key figure necessary, if the plan were to succeed, because he would be the justice assigned to dealing with any emergency legal matters sent to the southeastern region's Eleventh Circuit court.

==== Trump subpoena ====
The January 6 Committee's subpoena for testimony and related documents was formally issued to Trump on October 21, 2022. Under the subpoena, the committee demanded that Trump hand over documents related to communications with Roger Stone, John Eastman, and others by November 4, and requested testimony by November 14. The committee also specified that they wanted "information sufficient to identify every telephone or other communications device" used by Trump between November 3, 2020, and January 20, 2021.

On November 11, 2022, Trump sued the House select committee and challenged the subpoena, seeking to block testimony and submission of documents. Chairman Bennie Thompson has called the legal effort a "delay tactic".

The committee's official legal capacity to conduct their investigation expired on December 31, 2022. Just days before the end of December, the committee formally withdrew Trump's subpoena. Chairman Thompson said "... the select committee has concluded its hearings, released its final report and ... In light of the imminent end of our investigation, the select committee can no longer pursue the specific information covered by the subpoena".

== Tenth hearing – December 19, 2022 ==
=== Participants ===
Select Committee members	Witnesses	On pre-recorded testimony	On audio-visual exhibit
Bennie Thompson – Chairman, Representative (D-MS 2nd district); Liz Cheney – Vice Chair, Representative (R-WY)			

=== Synopsis of tenth hearing ===
Full-length video of the tenth and final public hearing of the Select Committee. (Source: January 6th Committee's channel on YouTube).

The tenth and final televised public hearing was held on December 19, 2022, at 1 pm Eastern time. A compilation of video clips, including footage of the riot and witness depositions, was shown.

Each committee member then made a live "opening statement":

- Chairman Thompson confirmed that the final report will be released later in the week, and that the report will have "a bulk" of the select committee's findings.
- Vice Chair Cheney elaborated on the history and importance of the peaceful transfer of power.
- Rep. Lofgren summarized the details regarding the "Big Lie" tactics.
- Rep. Schiff outlined the details of Trump's interference at the state level, Trump's fake electors plan, and the targeting of election workers.
- Rep Kinzinger detailed regarding the DOJ pressure campaign by Trump and his allies, including to the January 3rd attempt of appointing Jeffrey Clark as acting Attorney General of the DOJ.
- Rep. Aguilar reviewed Trump's pressure campaign on state officials, Congress, and even Vice-President Pence to take "unlawful action" in overturning the election results.
- Rep. Murphy discussed how Trump summoned the crowd to Washington, D.C., on January 6 and how his tweets "galvanized" violent extremists.
- Rep. Luria recapped Trump's 187 minutes of inaction and dereliction of duty.
- Rep. Raskin elaborated on the subcommittee's work and their consideration, reasoning, and evidence for criminal referrals. They recommended that Trump be charged with four crimes: 18 U.S.C § 1512(c), 18 U.S.C § 371, 18 U.S.C § 1001, and 18 U.S.C § 2383. (These are: Obstruction of an official proceeding, conspiracy to defraud the United States, conspiracy to make a false statement and "incite," "assist" or "aid or comfort" an insurrection.) Raskin also stated that the subcommittee's work had been limited by the lack of cooperation, and hopes the DOJ can use the subcommittee's work for their own investigation.

The committee also referred John Eastman.

Newer, previously un-televised video testimony from Hope Hicks and Kellyanne Conway was shown as well. In her testimony, Hicks, who was Trump's White House communications director, claimed that Trump at one point told her "something along the lines of 'nobody will care about my legacy if I lose ... the only thing that matters is winning.'" Conway, in her testimony, claimed that she briefly spoke with Trump the day after the Capitol attack and that he said his supporters were upset.

The committee also recommended that the House Ethics Committee follow up on Rep. Kevin McCarthy (California), Rep. Jim Jordan (Ohio), Scott Perry (Pennsylvania), and Andy Biggs (Arizona) refusing to answer subpoenas.

Immediately after the hearing, the committee released a 154-page executive summary of its findings. It said it was ready to release its final report. The vote of the committee was unanimous.

== Media coverage ==
According to The Washington Post, "The eight hearings held by the House committee investigating the ... attack on the U.S. Capitol have been riveting to watch—and even more remarkably, they have captured the daily news cycle again and again, not only finding substantial TV and streaming audiences as they aired but also consistently landing at the top of broadcast and cable news reports and of newspaper front pages." The Post referenced several factors for the popularity of the hearings, stating that "Each hearing has produced at least one legitimate nugget of actual news, and sometimes more than one." They cited the importance of the brisk pace of the hearings which "move[d] expeditiously from brief opening statements to video or live testimony" and without extemporaneous speeches or tedious delays. Liz Cheney was called "a compelling central character" with "steely resolve and understated intensity" who "is hard to look away from." The Post also gave some importance to timing, saying that "other major news stories of recent months ... have not occurred on the same dates as the hearings themselves."

According to CNN, "the committee has certainly succeeded in keeping the attention of America's political junkies. Trump devotees are the exception to that rule, but even they have dropped the 'nobody's watching the hearings' talking point that was trotted out in June. In a streaming and on-demand world, the total reach of the hearings to date is unknowable, but many tens of millions of Americans have soaked up the committee's findings, which is no small thing in a fractured media space."

=== June 9, 2022 ===
June 9 viewership
Network	Viewers
ABC	5,215,000
MSNBC	4,303,000
NBC	3,696,000
CBS	3,490,000
FNC	3,062,000
CNN	2,740,000
FBN	223,000
CNBC	158,000
Newsmax	137,000
NewsNation	125,000
Broadcast networks Cable news networks

The first public hearing of 2022 was carried live by all the major networks except the Fox broadcast network and Fox News. Mediated live coverage was provided by major broadcast television networks ABC, CBS and NBC, as well as cable channels such as C-SPAN, CNN, Fox Business Network, MSNBC, and Newsmax, as well as news organizations such as The Wall Street Journal, Bloomberg Television, and ABC TV (Australian TV channel), and free streaming channels such as NBC News NOW, and LiveNOW from Fox via YouTube and other live streaming outlets. Nielsen Media Research estimates that at least 20 million households watched the first hearing on traditional television, comparable to the average rating for NBC Sunday Night Football, which ranks as television's number one program.

==== Fox News alternate coverage during hearing ====
Instead of airing the hearing live, the Fox broadcast network stuck with repeats of its regularly scheduled programming, while Fox News broadcast Tucker Carlson Tonight and Hannity without commercial breaks for the entire two-hour hearing. During Carlson's show, he repeated false claims about FBI involvement, stating that federal agents had instigated the violence during the January 6 riots.

On Sean Hannity's show, he referred to the January 6 House Select Committee hearing as a "boring ... Hollywood production" and blamed the Capitol Police for their inability to defend the U.S. Capitol Building and prevent mob violence.

The New York Times observed that by "not carrying the hearings live in prime time" Fox News was able to avoid a potentially "awkward on-screen moment." During the weeks following the 2020 election, Tucker Carlson and Sean Hannity promoted Trump's election fraud narrative. Previously disclosed text messages between Hannity and White House press secretary Kayleigh McEnany were presented during the hearing, which revealed a coordinated internal strategy and agreed-upon public messaging campaign with the Fox News host.

NPR's David Folkenflik said coverage of the hearing would have required Fox News to "broadcast flat contradictions of what many leading Fox News personalities have told their audiences in the past year and a half." Chris Hayes, of MSNBC, condemned Fox News saying they "went to great lengths" by not airing the hearing and that the network simultaneously countered the findings of the House Select Committee investigation by doing "everything in their power to make sure their viewers were shielded from the brutal truth about the violent coup that Donald Trump fomented." For example, Hayes said their skipping of commercial breaks would cost the network unknown thousands of dollars but tended to keep viewers from switching to the other networks, where they would have found live hearing coverage.

=== July 21, 2022 ===
The eighth public hearing of 2022—and the second to be aired live on primetime—had nearly 17.7 million viewers. After his video testimony aired, Donald Trump Jr., who testified that he was among those tried to encourage his father to denounce the attack on the U.S. Capitol, was greatly mocked on social media for misinterpreting what The Godfather's line "go to the mattresses" meant; Newsweek journalist Tom Norton even noted that "Such descriptions arguably paint Trump in the same brush strokes as a crime boss."

=== Televised production and viewership ===
The United States House Select Committee contracted James Goldston, former president of ABC News, as an advisor to help produce the public hearings and present the findings with a polished televised format. According to the Nielsen ratings, "In total, each of the eight hearings averaged 13.1 million viewers ... The two prime time hearings averaged 18.9 million viewers per hearing, and the other six hearings, which were daytime broadcasts, averaged 11.2 million viewers per hearing."

=== Newspaper coverage ===
The New York Times presented a detailed summary of the eight hearings held in June and July 2022. A ninth hearing was convened in October.

== See also ==
- Enough, a memoir by Cassidy Hutchinson
- Planning of the January 6 United States Capitol attack
- 1776 Returns – Plan for takeover of government buildings on January 6, 2021
- Criminal proceedings in the January 6 United States Capitol attack
- Eastman memos
- Ginni Thomas' efforts to overturn the 2020 presidential election
- James Goldston's work as an adviser to the Jan 6. Committee
- Jeffrey Clark letter
- Pence Card
- Republican efforts to restrict voting following the 2020 presidential election
- Republican reactions to Donald Trump's claims of 2020 election fraud
- Sedition Caucus
