= Enough (book) =

2023 memoir by Cassidy Hutchinson

- 2023 book jacket
- Author: Cassidy Hutchinson
- Audio read by: Cassidy Hutchinson
- Subject: Hutchinson, Cassidy; Trump, Donald,—1946; Presidents—United States—Staff—Biography; Capitol Riot; Washington, D.C., 2021; United States—Politics and government—2017-2021
- Genre: Autobiographies
- Set in: Trump White House
- Publisher: Simon & Schuster
- Publication date: September 26, 2023
- Publication place: United States
- Media type: Print, e-book, audio
- Pages: 384
- ISBN: 978-1-6680-2828-5 978-1-6680-2830-8
- OCLC: 1397065848
- Website: Official website

Enough is a memoir by Cassidy Hutchinson that centers on her time as assistant to Mark Meadows, the White House chief of staff during the Trump presidency, and her experiences after the January 6 United States Capitol attack. It also details the events that led to her participation in the sixth public hearing of the Select Committee on the January 6 Attack on June 28, 2022. Enough was published by Simon & Schuster, and released in September 2023.
