= Cassidy Hutchinson =

American political aide (born 1996)

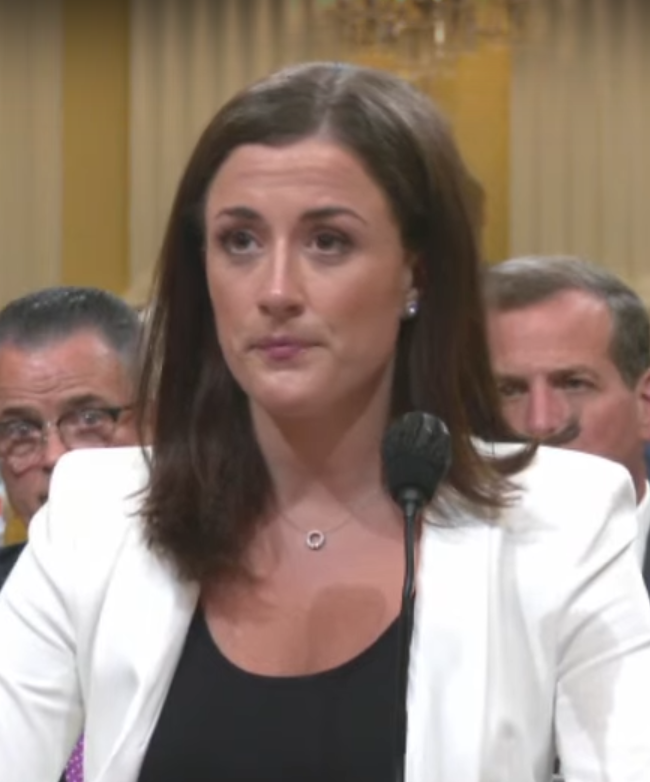
- Hutchinson in 2022
- Born: Cassidy Jacqueline Hutchinson; December 12, 1996 (age 29); Pennington, New Jersey, U.S.
- Education: Christopher Newport University (BA)
- Notable work: Enough (2023)

Cassidy Jacqueline Hutchinson (born December 12, 1996) is a former White House aide who served as assistant to Chief of Staff Mark Meadows during the first Trump administration.

Hutchinson testified at the June 28, 2022, public hearings of the United States House Select Committee on the January 6 Attack about President Donald Trump's alleged conduct and that of his senior aides and political allies before and during the January 6 United States Capitol attack. Hutchinson's testimony received significant national attention, with several media outlets calling it "compelling" and "explosive", despite criticism from Trump allies.

Hutchinson's memoir, Enough, was published in 2023.

== Early life and education ==
Raised in Pennington, New Jersey, Hutchinson graduated from Hopewell Valley Central High School in 2015. She holds a black belt in karate. She studied at Christopher Newport University from 2015 to 2018, graduating in 2019 with a Bachelor of Arts degree in political science and American studies. Hutchinson has called herself a "first-generation college student".

== Career ==
=== Washington D.C. ===
While attending Christopher Newport University, Hutchinson interned for U.S. Senator Ted Cruz in the summer of 2016 and for House whip Steve Scalise in the summer of 2017. In the summer of 2018, she served as an intern in the White House Office of Legislative Affairs. Later, she became an employee of the office.

In March 2020, when Mark Meadows became Trump's fourth chief of staff, he selected her as one of his aides. She soon became Meadows's principal assistant, continuing to the end of Trump's first term. Her title was Special Assistant to the President and Coordinator for Legislative Affairs. She worked in an office next to Meadows's office, just down the hall from the Oval Office. She took notes at meetings and traveled with Meadows, monitoring his phone, and relaying his orders. She was described as a close confidante of Meadows. Identified as a "White House legislative aide", Hutchinson was the subject of a nationally syndicated AP photograph in which she was shown dancing to the Village People song "Y.M.C.A." alongside White House press secretary Kayleigh McEnany at the end of Trump's September 21, 2020, campaign rally in Swanton, Ohio.

In her 2023 memoir Enough, Hutchinson alleges that Rudy Giuliani groped her backstage during Trump's speech on January 6, 2021. She also wrote that then-Congressman Matt Gaetz made "repeated passes" at her and asked her to "escort" him to his room at Camp David in 2020. In 2024, House Speaker Mike Johnson's staff advised Representative Barry Loudermilk against subpoenaing Hutchinson's texts, due to the risk of public exposure of "sexual texts from members who were trying to engage in sexual favors" with Hutchinson.

As Trump's term ended, he said that Hutchinson was supposed to work for his post-presidency operation in Florida, but the plan was "abruptly dropped" before she was supposed to begin.

=== January 6 Committee testimony ===
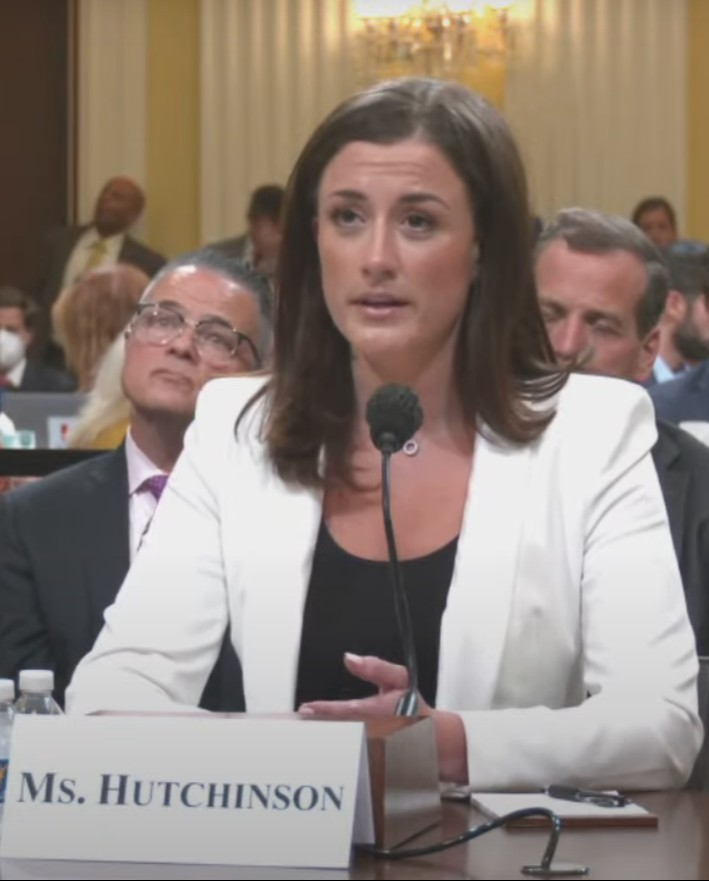
Hutchinson testifying

Under subpoena, Hutchinson gave four depositions to the committee, totaling more than two dozen hours, testifying on live television on June 28, 2022. Before her March 7 deposition, she received multiple messages from Trump allies suggesting she show loyalty to Trump in her testimony. Days before her testimony, she dismissed her attorney, Stefan Passantino, who had deep connections with Trump associates, replacing him with Jody Hunt, a former longtime Justice Department official and chief of staff for Trump's first attorney general, Jeff Sessions.

==== On events leading to January 6 ====
Hutchinson testified that she overheard mention of Oath Keepers and Proud Boys during the planning of the Save America March, when Trump's personal attorney Rudy Giuliani was present. Several leaders of both groups were later indicted on seditious conspiracy charges for their alleged roles in the January 6 United States Capitol attack.

Hutchinson testified that both Meadows and Giuliani sought presidential pardons. She previously told the committee in depositions that congressmen Matt Gaetz, Andy Biggs, Scott Perry, and Louie Gohmert had also requested pardons.

She testified that on January 3, 2021, White House counsel Pat Cipollone pulled her aside to express his concern upon hearing Trump planned to march to the Capitol with his supporters on January 6; Hutchinson recalled him saying, "We're going to get charged with every crime imaginable if we make that movement happen."

Hutchinson also testified that Trump threw his lunch plate against a wall in a White House dining room on December 1, 2020, when he learned that Attorney General William Barr had made a public statement that he had not discovered any evidence of election fraud. The wall was splashed with ketchup. On other occasions, he had "flip[ped] the tablecloth to let all the contents of the table go onto the floor and likely break or go everywhere".

==== On January 6 events ====
Hutchinson testified that Trump and Meadows were told that some people were carrying weapons, including firearms, and therefore could not clear magnetometers to enter the rally. Trump insisted that he didn't care if his supporters had weapons and tried to order the magnetometers removed, saying, "They're not here to hurt me."

Hutchinson testified that she was told by then-White House deputy chief of staff Tony Ornato that when Trump got into the presidential SUV after his rally, hoping to drive to the Capitol as his supporters marched there, his lead Secret Service agent Robert Engel told him it was too dangerous and that they were returning to the White House. Hutchinson said Ornato told her that Trump became irate, attempted to grab the steering wheel, and lunged at Engel's clavicle. She testified that Engel was present in the room with Ornato as he related the incident and did not contradict the account.

On July 1, 2022, three days after Hutchinson's testimony, CNN reported that it had spoken with two Secret Service agents who had heard accounts of the incident from multiple other agents since February 2021, including Trump's driver. Although details differed, agents confirmed that there was an angry confrontation, with one agent saying that Trump "tried to lunge over the seat—for what reason, nobody had any idea", but no one said Trump that attacked Engel. Another Secret Service official told CNN that Engel denied that Trump grabbed at the steering wheel or lunged toward an agent on his detail, and that Ornato denied telling Hutchinson such. Politico reported that Engel had told the committee during an early 2022 deposition that he had not told his full account of the incident to his Secret Service colleagues for at least 14 months.

On July 14, 2022, CNN published an account by a Metropolitan Police officer in the motorcade that corroborated the "heated exchange" Trump had with his Secret Service detail when they refused to take him to the Capitol after his rally on January 6. In March 2024, details of Hutchinson's relaying of Ornato's account were contradicted by the release of testimony from the driver of the vehicle. The unnamed driver testified that Trump did not reach for, lunge at, or grab the steering wheel, and that Trump did not scream or seem irate. The driver did corroborate that Trump sought to go the Capitol and had "irritation" in his voice.

As the events of the day unfolded, Hutchinson recalled Cipollone telling Meadows words to the effect of "'Mark, we need to do something more. They're literally calling for the vice president to be f'ing hung.' And Mark had responded something to the effect of 'you heard him, Pat. He thinks Mike deserves it. He doesn't think they're doing anything wrong', to which Pat said something, 'this is f'ing crazy, we need to be doing something more.'"

==== On events after January 6 ====
An interview transcript released on December 22, 2022, revealed that Hutchinson gave additional testimony on September 14 and 15, 2022. During this testimony, she said Trump allies had pressured her not to talk to the committee. She also said that with former White House aide Alyssa Farah Griffin acting as her backchannel, she was able to conduct the interview without Passantino's knowledge, and that Passantino wanted her to evade the committee's questions. Hutchinson testified that Passantino told her, "We just want to focus on protecting the president" and "We all know you're loyal", and that he would help her get "a really good job in Trump world" because "We want to keep you in the family". She also testified Meadows told her Trump knew he had lost the election.

=== Justice Department investigation ===
In April 2026, it was reported that the Justice Department had begun an investigation of Hutchinson's congressional testimony "several weeks ago" after receiving a referral from a Trump ally in Congress who accused Hutchinson of lying. In what The New York Times called "an unusual move", the investigation was assigned to the Civil Rights Division rather than the U.S. attorney's office in Washington. In October 2026, a federal grand jury was empanelled; on October 27, it was reported that the grand jury had refused to issue the indictment requested by the Justice Department.

== Book ==
- Hutchinson, Cassidy (2023). Enough. Simon & Schuster. ISBN 978-1-6680-2828-5.
