= Sarah Matthews (deputy press secretary) =

American political aide

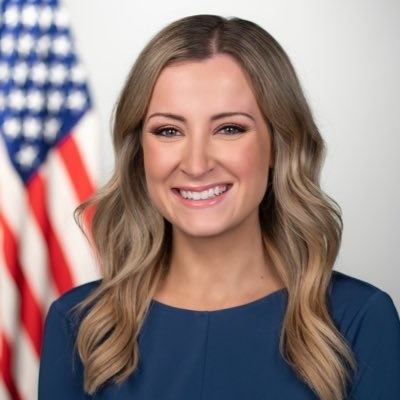

White House Deputy Press Secretary
- In office June 2020 – January 6, 2021 Serving with Judd Deere
- President: Donald Trump
- Preceded by: Hogan Gidley
- Succeeded by: TJ Ducklo; Sabrina Singh

Personal details
- Born: Sarah Anne Matthews; February 20, 1995 (age 31) North Canton, Ohio
- Party: Republican
- Education: Kent State University (BA)

Sarah Anne Matthews (born February 20, 1995) is an American political aide who served as the deputy press secretary for the Donald Trump administration from June 2020 to January 2021. She resigned from her position as deputy press secretary following the attack on the United States Capitol on January 6, 2021. Matthews was an outspoken critic of Trump’s 2024 presidential campaign.

== Education ==
Matthews graduated in 2013 from Hoover High School in North Canton, Ohio. She earned a Bachelor of Arts degree in public relations from Kent State University in 2017.

== Career ==
Matthews worked as an intern for Senator Rob Portman and the former House Speaker John Boehner. She worked as press secretary of the House Committee on Energy and Commerce and joined Donald Trump’s 2020 presidential campaign in 2019 as a spokesperson. Matthews became White House deputy press secretary in 2020. She resigned in the wake of the 2021 United States Capitol attack and provided critical testimony during a primetime hearing before the United States House Select Committee on the January 6 Attack in July 2022.

Following the Trump administration, Matthews served as the communications director for the Republican members of the United States House Select Committee on the Climate Crisis.

After working in government, Matthews became a senior advisor for the Strategic Management Services company Merrimack Potomac + Charles. She is now a contibutor for The Bulwark and appears regularly as a political commentator on MSNOW and CNN.

== Personal life ==
Matthews is one of two children born to Jeffrey and Heidi Matthews. She holds a black belt in karate. Her grandfather was George Thomas Matthews (1935–2022), originally from Muskegon, Michigan, who later lived in North Canton, Ohio, and was a career metallurgist and engineer.

== See also ==
- List of former Trump administration officials who endorsed Kamala Harris
- List of Republicans who oppose the Donald Trump 2024 presidential campaign
