= 1776 Returns =

Plan for takeover of US government buildings on January 6

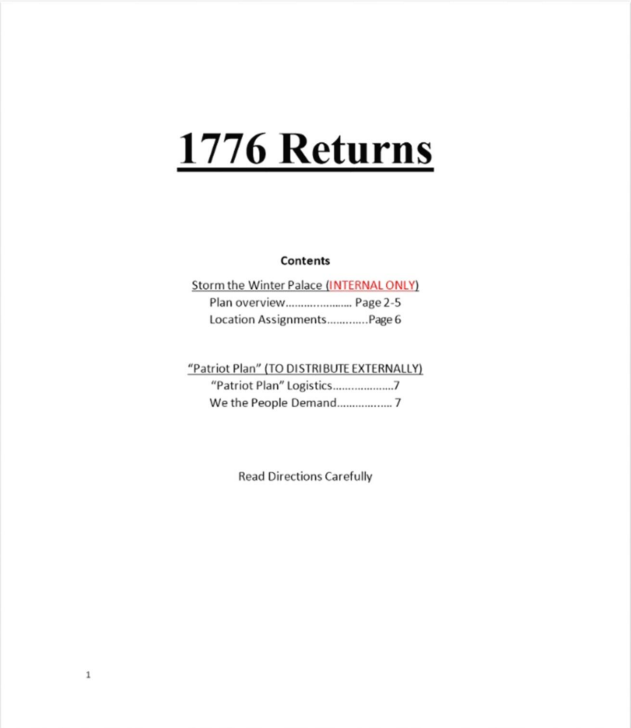
First page of 1776 Returns

1776 Returns is the title of a document that outlined strategic plans for the takeover of US government buildings on January 6, 2021. It was circulated among the Proud Boys organization. The nine-page document was sent to Enrique Tarrio, chairman of the Proud Boys, one week before the January 6 United States Capitol attack, by a Miami-based cryptocurrency promoter named Eryka Gemma Flores, who was romantically linked to Tarrio.

== Contents ==
The document is nine pages long; it is undated and did not identify a specific author. The document laid out a plan for the storming and occupation of eight key buildings (designated as "Targeted Buildings") in the District of Columbia on January 6, 2021. The target locations were the Russell, Dirksen, and Hart Senate office buildings; the U.S. Supreme Court Building; the Cannon, Longworth, and Rayburn House office buildings; and the CNN's D.C. office building. The Capitol itself, which was the ultimate target of the January 6 insurrection, is not specifically included on the list of targeted buildings, but the document uses the phase "Storm the Winter Palace" as an apparent reference to the Capitol, and the plan outlined by the document contains similarities to the actual attack on the Capitol on January 6.

1776 Returns recommended that groups of at least 50 storm and occupy each buildings, with a goal to fill buildings "with patriots and communicate our demands". It set forth a five-stage strategy included a call for the mobilization of followers and seizure of government buildings: "infiltrate"; "execution"; "distract"; "occupy"; and "sit-in". It suggested slogans to chant (such as "No Trump, No America") and suggested that protesters should initially blend in to appear "unsuspecting" and to "not look tactical". The document directed that the team responsible for assaulting each building should be led by a "lead"; a "second"; and a "hype man".

A section titled the "Patriot Plan" was intended for public distribution, calling on people to gather at 1 p.m. on January 6 and await a signal to attack, with a demand to nullify the elections results and have the military hold a new election.

== Authorship and role in subsequent investigations ==
The author of 1776 Returns has not been confirmed. However, Flores sent the document to Tarrio a week before the January 6 attacks. After the attack, Flores agreed to an informal, untranscribed appearance in early 2022 with House Select Committee on the January 6 Attack investigators, in which she named Samuel Armes as the author of the document. Armes, like Flores, is a cryptocurrency advocate. January 6 Committee investigators interviewed Armes in July 2022. He denied drafting the "1776 Returns" document and claimed that Flores was "blame-shifting" by attributing authorship to him. However, Flores acknowledged that in summer 2020, he drafted a "war gaming" plan and then shared it with Flores by Google Drive. Armes told investigators that the document was between three and five pages and explored "a scenario where a certain president doesn't leave the White House or there is just mad chaos in the streets because no one knows who's in charge". He indicated that he indirectly provided inspiration for the nine-page "1776 Returns" document; in the interview with investigators, he distinguished between "aspects that he said he had written from components he said he did not". He said that he "never imagined that" what he had written would ultimately be "turned into" an operational plan to attack federal buildings. In the interview, Armes said he had a slight acquaintance with Tarrio through their mutual friendship with Flores.

Prosecutors later subpoenaed Flores to testify before a federal grand jury investigating Tarrio and the Proud Boys' role in the attacks; she refused to testify, invoking her Fifth Amendment right against self-incrimination.

In all, more than 30 Proud Boys were charged with crimes in connection with the January 6 attack. The "1776 Returns" document was one of many pieces of evidence in the trial of Tarrio and four lieutenants: Ethan Nordean, Joe Biggs, Zachary Rehl and Dominic Pezzola. It was cited in the indictment of defendants and in court filings. The existence of the document was first reported in March 2022 in the New York Times, and the full document became public in June 2022, when Rehl's attorneys submitted it as an exhibit to a motion asking for pretrial release. In May 2023, following a lengthy trial, a jury convicted Tarrio, Nordean, Biggs, and Rehl guilty of seditious conspiracy, among other crimes; Pezzola was acquitted of seditious conspiracy but convicted of other felonies. During the trial, the prosecutors introduced text message correspondence between Flores and Tarrio, in which Flores touted her 1776 Returns document and wrote, "If you don't like my plan, let me know. I will pitch elsewhere. But I want you to be the executor and benefactor of my brilliance." During his trial, Tarrio declined to testify in his own defense. Outside court, however, Tarrio claimed he never opened or used the 1776 Returns document, but records showed that Tarrio used the phrase "the Winter Palace" in discussions with his associate before and after January 6, and Tarrio did Google searches for "The Winter Palace" during that time.
