= Helen Gandy =

American civil servant (1897–1988)

Helen Wilburforce Gandy
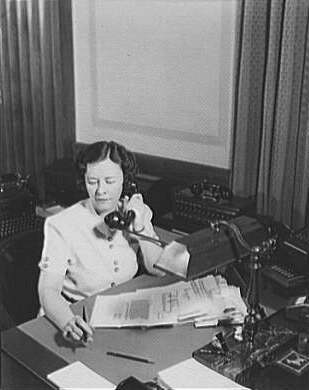
- Helen Gandy in her office in the Justice Department in the 1940s, by Theodor Horydczak
- Born: April 8, 1897; Fairton or Port Norris, New Jersey, US
- Died: July 7, 1988 (aged 91); DeLand, Florida, US
- Occupation: Secretary/civil servant
- Employer: Federal Bureau of Investigation
- Known for: Secretary to J. Edgar Hoover for 54 years

Helen Wilburforce Gandy (April 8, 1897 – July 7, 1988) was the American longtime secretary to Federal Bureau of Investigation director J. Edgar Hoover, who called her "indispensable". Serving in that role for 54 years she exercised great behind-the-scenes influence on Hoover and the operations of the Bureau. Following Hoover's death in 1972, she spent weeks destroying his "Personal File," thought to contain the most incriminating material Hoover used to manipulate or blackmail the most powerful figures in Washington.

== Early life ==
Helen Gandy was born in Rockville, New Jersey, one of three children (two daughters and a son) born to Franklin Dallas and Annie (née Williams) Gandy. She grew up in New Jersey in Fairton or the Port Norris section of Commercial Township (sources differ) and graduated from Bridgeton High School in Bridgeton, New Jersey. In 1918, aged 21, she moved to Washington, D.C., where she later took classes at Strayer Business College and George Washington University Law School.

== Career ==
Gandy briefly worked in a department store in Washington before finding a job as a file clerk at the Justice Department in 1918. Within weeks, she went to work as a typist for Hoover, effective March 25, 1918, having told Hoover in her interview she had "no immediate plans to marry". She, like Hoover, would never marry; both were completely devoted to the Bureau instead.

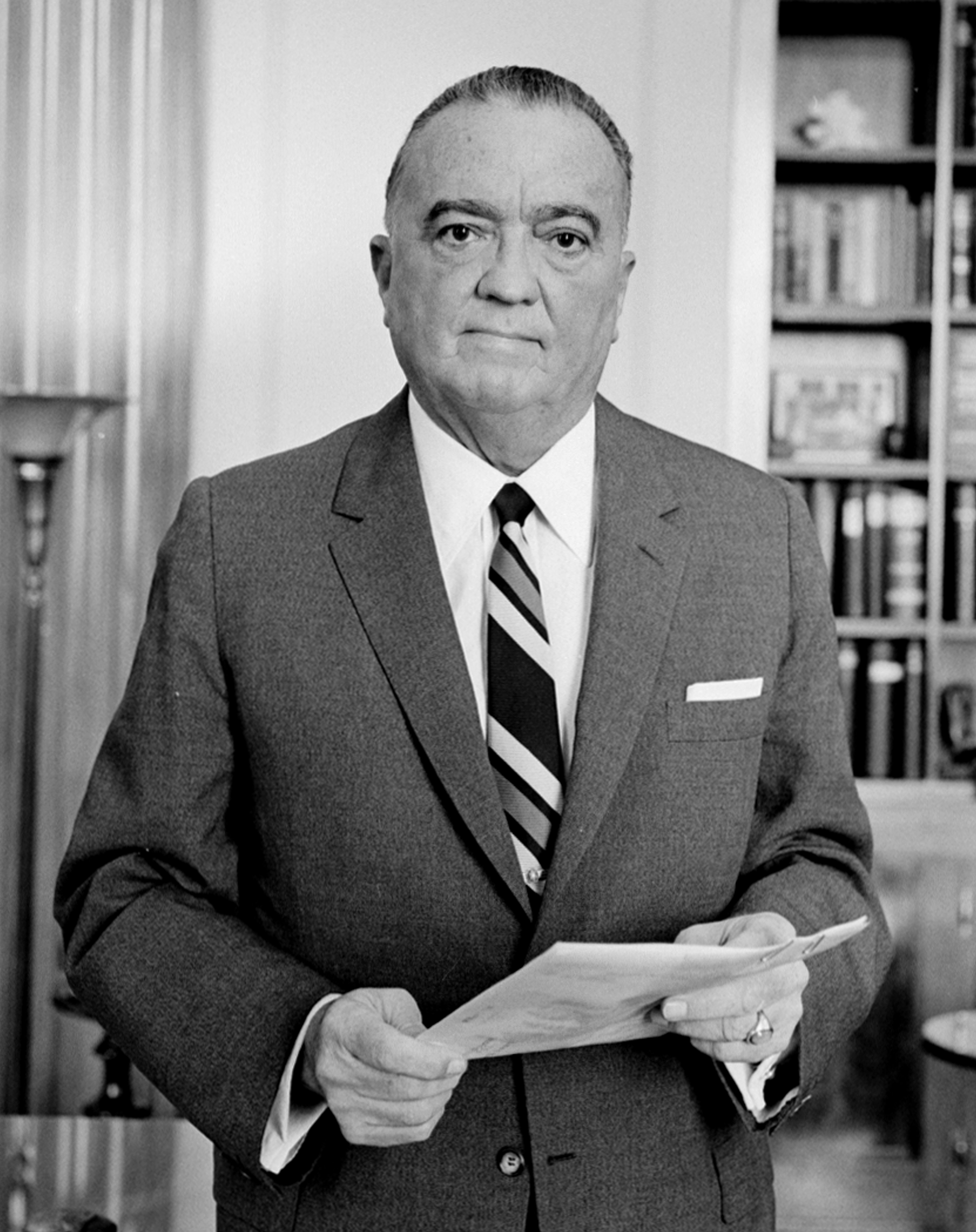
J. Edgar Hoover, director of the F.B.I, in 1961. Gandy worked for him from 1918 to his death in 1972.

When Hoover went to the Bureau of Investigation (its original title; it became the FBI in 1935) as its assistant director on August 22, 1921, he specifically requested Gandy return from vacation to help him in the new post. Hoover became director of the Bureau in 1924, and Gandy continued in his service. She was promoted to "office assistant" on August 23, 1937, and "executive assistant" on October 1, 1939. Though she would receive promotions in her civil service grade subsequently, she retained her title as executive assistant until her retirement on May 2, 1972, the day Hoover died. Hoover said of her: "if there is anyone in this Bureau whose services are indispensable, I consider Miss Gandy to be that person." Despite this, Curt Gentry wrote:

Theirs was a rigidly formal relationship. He always called her "Miss Gandy" (when angry, barking it out as one word). In all those fifty-four years he never once called her by her first name.

Hoover biographers Theoharis and Cox would say "her stern face recalled Cerberus at the gate", a view echoed by Anthony Summers in his life of Hoover, who also pictured Gandy as Hoover's first line of defense against the outside world. When Attorney General Robert F. Kennedy, Hoover's superior, had a direct telephone line installed between their offices, Hoover refused to answer the phone. "Put that damn thing on Miss Gandy's desk where it belongs", Hoover would declare.

Gentry described Gandy's influence:

Her genteel manner and pleasant voice contrasted sharply with this domineering presence. Yet behind the politeness was a resolute firmness not unlike his, and no small amount of influence. Many a career in the Bureau had been quietly manipulated by her. Even those who disliked him praised her, most often commenting on her remarkable ability to get along with all kinds of people. That she held her position for fifty-four years was the best evidence of this, for it was a Bureau tradition that the closer you were to him, the more demanding he was.

William C. Sullivan, an agent with the Bureau for three decades, reported in his memoir that when he worked in the public relations section answering mail from the public, he gave a correspondent the wrong measurements for Hoover's personal popover recipe, relying on memory rather than the files. Gandy, ever protective of her boss, caught the error and brought it to Hoover's attention. The director then placed an official letter of reprimand in Sullivan's file for the lapse. Mark Felt, deputy associate director of the FBI, wrote in his memoir that Gandy "was bright and alert and quick-tongued—and completely dedicated to her boss, whose interests she constantly protected".

=== Files ===
Hoover died during the night of May 1–2, 1972. According to Curt Gentry, who wrote the 1991 book J Edgar Hoover: The Man and the Secrets, Hoover's body was not discovered by his live-in cook and general housekeeper, Annie Fields; rather, it was discovered by James Crawford, who had been Hoover's chauffeur for 37 years. Crawford then yelled out to Fields and Tom Moton (Hoover's new chauffeur after Crawford had retired in January 1972). Fields first called Hoover's personal physician, Dr. Robert Choisser, then used another phone to call Clyde Tolson's private number. Tolson then called Gandy's private number with the news of Hoover's death along with orders to begin destroying the files. Within an hour, the "D List" ("d" standing for destruction) was being distributed, and the destruction of files began. However, The New York Times quoted an anonymous FBI source in spring 1975, who said: "Gandy had begun the destruction of files almost a year before Mr. Hoover's death and was instructed to purge the files that were presently in his office."

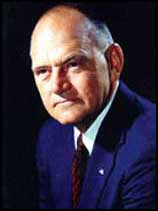
L. Patrick Gray, was appointed acting FBI director by President Nixon after Hoover's death

Anthony Summers reported that G. Gordon Liddy had said of his sources in the FBI: "by the time Gray went in to get the files, Miss Gandy had already got rid of them." The day after Hoover died, L. Patrick Gray, who had been named acting director by President Richard Nixon upon Tolson's resignation from that position, went to Hoover's office. Gandy paused from her work to give Gray a tour. He found file cabinets open and packing boxes being filled with papers. She informed him the boxes contained personal papers of Hoover's. Gandy stated Gray flipped through a few files and approved her work, but Gray was to deny he looked at any papers. Gandy also told Gray it would be a week before she could clear Hoover's effects out so Gray could move into the suite.

Gray reported to Nixon that he had secured Hoover's office and its contents. However, he had sealed only Hoover's personal inner office, where no files were stored, not the entire suite of offices. Since 1957, Hoover's "Official/Confidential" files, containing material too sensitive to include in the FBI's central files, had been kept in the outer office, where Gandy sat. Gentry reported that Gray would not have known where to look in Gandy's office for the files, as her office was lined floor to ceiling with filing cabinets; moreover, without her index to the files, he would not have been able to locate incriminating material, for files were deliberately mislabeled, e.g., President Nixon's file was labeled "Obscene Matters".

On May 4, Gandy transferred 12 boxes labelled "Official/Confidential", containing 167 files and 17,750 pages, to Mark Felt. Many of them contained inflammatory and derogatory information. Gray told the press that afternoon that "there are no dossiers or secret files. There are just general files, and I took steps to preserve their integrity." Yet, Gandy retained the "Personal File."

Gandy went through Hoover's "Personal File" in the office until May 12. She then transferred at least 32 file drawers of material to the basement recreation room of Hoover's Washington home at 4936 Thirtieth Place, NW, where she continued her work from May 13 to July 17. Gandy later testified in court that nothing official had been removed from the FBI's offices, "not even Mr. Hoover's badge." At Hoover's residence, the destruction was overseen by John P. Mohr, the third highest-ranking official in the FBI after Hoover and Tolson. They were aided by James Jesus Angleton, the Central Intelligence Agency's counterintelligence chief, whom Hoover's neighbors saw removing boxes from Hoover's home. Mohr would claim the boxes Angleton removed were cases of spoiled wine.

In 1975, when the House Committee on Government Oversight investigated the FBI's illegal COINTELPRO program of spying on and harassment of Martin Luther King Jr. and others, Gandy was summoned to testify regarding the "Personal Files." "I tore them up, put them in boxes, and they were taken away to be shredded," she told the congressmen about the papers. The FBI Washington field office had FBI drivers transport the material to Hoover's home, then once Gandy had gone through the material, the drivers transported it back to the field office in the Old Post Office Building on Pennsylvania Avenue, where it was shredded and burned.

Gandy stated that Hoover had left standing instructions to destroy his personal papers upon his death, and this instruction was confirmed by Tolson and Gray. She also stated that she destroyed no official papers; that everything was personal papers of Hoover's. The staff of the subcommittee did not believe her, but she told the committee: "I have no reason to lie." Representative Andrew Maguire (D-New Jersey), a freshman member of the 94th Congress, said "I find your testimony very difficult to believe." Gandy held her ground: "That is your privilege."

"I can give you my word. I know what there was—letters to and from friends, personal friends, a lot of letters," she testified. Gandy also said the files she took to Hoover's home included his financial papers, such as tax returns and investment statements, the deed to his home, and papers relating to his dogs' pedigrees.

Curt Gentry wrote:

Helen Gandy must have felt quite safe in testifying as she did, for who could contradict her? Only one other person knew exactly what the files contained, and he was dead.

In J. Edgar Hoover: The Man and His Secrets, Gentry describes the nature of the files: "their contents included blackmail material on the patriarch of an American political dynasty, his sons, their wives, and other women; allegations of two homosexual arrests which Hoover leaked to help defeat a witty, urbane Democratic presidential candidate; the surveillance reports on one of America's best-known first ladies and her alleged lovers, both male and female, white and black; the child molestation documentation the director used to control and manipulate one of the Red-baiting proteges; a list of the Bureau's spies in the White House during the eight administrations when Hoover was FBI director; the forbidden fruit of hundreds of illegal wiretaps and bugs, containing, for example, evidence that an attorney general, Tom C. Clark, who later became Supreme Court justice, had received payoffs from the Chicago syndicate; as well as celebrity files, with all the unsavory gossip Hoover could amass on some of the biggest names in show business."

== Personal life and death ==
Gandy lived for decades with Margaret E. Morrow. Morrow died on April 16, 1986.

Gandy died of a heart attack on July 7, 1988, either in DeLand (as indicated by her New York Times obituary) or in nearby Orange City, Florida, (as stated in her Washington Post obituary).

== Later years ==
Hoover left Gandy $5,000 in his will.

In 1961, she and her sister, Lucy G. Rodman, donated a portrait of their mother by Thomas Eakins to the Smithsonian American Art Museum. Gandy lived in Washington until 1986, when she moved to DeLand, Florida, in Volusia County, where a niece lived. Gandy was an avid trout fisher.

== In popular culture ==
Gandy has been portrayed by actresses Lee Kessler in J. Edgar Hoover (1987), Naomi Watts in J. Edgar (2011), and Rebecca Toolan in Bad Times at the El Royale (2018).

== Bibliography ==
- John Crewdson. "U.S. Investigating Missing F.B.I. Data". The New York Times. June 7, 1972. 14.
- W. Mark Felt. The FBI Pyramid: From the Inside. New York: G.P. Putnam's Sons, 1979. (ISBN 0-399-11904-3).
- Curt Gentry. J. Edgar Hoover: The Man and the Secrets. New York: W.W. Norton, 1991. (ISBN 0-393-02404-0)
- Richard Hack. Puppetmaster: The Secret Life of J. Edgar Hoover. Beverly Hills, California: New Millennium Press, 2004. (ISBN 1-893224-87-2)
- "Hoover's Political Spying for Presidents" Time. December 15, 1975.
- "Obituaries". Orlando Sentinel. July 9, 1988. D10.
- Gandy's Social Security Death Index. 577-60-1115 Her SSN
- "United States Social Security Death Index", database, FamilySearch (https://familysearch.org/ark:/61903/1:1:JTZB-L23 : May 20, 2014), Helen W Gandy, July 15, 1988; citing U.S. Social Security Administration, Death Master File, database (Alexandria, Virginia: National Technical Information Service, ongoing).
- William C. Sullivan with Bill Brown. The Bureau: My Thirty Years in Hoover's F.B.I. New York: W.W. Norton, 1979. (ISBN 0-393-01236-0)
- Athan G. Theoharis, Tony G. Poveda, Susan Rosefeld, and Richard Gid Powers. The FBI: A Comprehensive Reference Guide. New York: Checkmark Books, 2000. (ISBN 0-8160-4228-4)
- Robert McG. Thomas. "John Mohr, 86, Hoover Confident and Ally at F.B.I.". The New York Times. February 1, 1997. 26.
- "The Truth About Hoover" (cover story) Time. December 22, 1975.
- United Press International. "Secretary Says She Destroyed Hoover's Letters on His Orders". The New York Times. December 2, 1975. 14.
- United States. Congress. House of Representatives. Committee on Government Operations. Subcommittee on Government Information and Individual Rights. Inquiry Into the Destruction of Former FBI Director J. Edgar Hoover's Files and FBI Recordkeeping: Hearing Before a Subcommittee of the Committee on Government Operations, House of Representatives, 94th Congress, December 1, 1975. Washington, D.C.: United States Government Printing Office, 1975.
