= Howard Simons =

American journalist and editor (1929–1989)

- Born: June 3, 1929; Albany, New York, U.S.
- Died: June 13, 1989 (aged 60); Jacksonville, Florida, U.S.
- Education: Union College (BA)
- Known for: Managing editor of The Washington Post

Howard Simons (June 3, 1929 – June 13, 1989) was the managing editor of The Washington Post at the time of the Watergate scandal, and later curator of the Nieman Foundation for Journalism at Harvard University.

== Early life and education ==
Simons was born to a Jewish family and raised in Albany, New York, and received a BA from Union College in Schenectady in 1951 and a master's degree a year later from the Columbia University Graduate School of Journalism. After serving in U.S. Army Intelligence during the Korean War, he became a science reporter in Washington for several news organizations, and joined The Post as a science writer in 1961. He became assistant managing editor in 1966 and managing editor in 1971.

In 1966, he received the Raymond Clapper Memorial Award for his Washington reporting.

== Watergate coverage ==
According to Carol Felsenthal of Politico Magazine, Simons took the first phone call, on June 18, 1972, from Democratic National Committee general counsel Joseph Califano Jr., about a break-in, the night before, at DNC headquarters at the Watergate complex. Simons took charge and with help from fellow editors Barry Sussman and Harry Rosenfeld, guided Bob Woodward and Carl Bernstein, and championed the young reporters for what became a national story.

Simons is credited with dubbing Mark Felt, their well-placed source, "Deep Throat," in reference to the pornographic film of the same name.

"When the time came, it was managing editor Howard Simons--not Ben Bradlee or other ranking editors--who made the crucial early decisions that led to the Washington Post's extraordinary coverage of the Watergate scandal, especially the decision to allow the metropolitan staff, which did not normally report on national politics, to pursue the story."
The Great Cover-Up by Barry Sussman, page 66.

Simons was portrayed by Martin Balsam in All the President's Men, the 1976 film based on Bernstein and Woodward's 1974 book of the same name, depicting the Post's investigation of Watergate. He was later played by David Cross in the 2017 film The Post.

== After The Washington Post ==
Simons left The Post for a position as Curator at The Nieman Foundation for Journalism at Harvard University in 1984.

Simons authored Jewish Times: Voices of the American Jewish Experience, (Houghton-Mifflin, 1988), and Simons' List Book (1977). He edited two books with Joseph A. Califano, Jr., The Media and the Law and The Media and Business, and in 1986 wrote a spy novel with Haynes Johnson called The Landing.

A well-known quotation attributed to Simons:

"People who are funny and smart and return phone calls get much better press than people who are just funny and smart."

He stepped down from the Nieman position on May 25, 1989, on medical leave, and succumbed to pancreatic cancer three weeks later, aged 60.

A scholarship named after him assists minority students aspiring in journalism (see).
