= William Gaines (professor) =

American journalist and professor of journalism

William C. Gaines (November 1, 1933 – July 20, 2016) was an American journalist and professor of journalism. Gaines was a Pulitzer Prize-winning investigative reporter for the Chicago Tribune. He retired from the paper in 2001 and taught in the Department of Journalism at the University of Illinois at Urbana-Champaign until his retirement and designation as an emeritus faculty member in 2007. He died on July 20, 2016, at the age of 82.

== Early life and career ==
Gaines earned a bachelor's degree in broadcasting at Butler University in 1956. He served two years in the United States Army working for Armed Forces Radio in Germany. In 1963, he became a reporter for the Chicago Tribune, and then became an investigative reporter in 1974. From 1975 to 1999, Gaines taught an investigative reporting course each semester at Columbia College in Chicago. He was named to the Knight Chair in Journalism at the University of Illinois at Urbana-Champaign in 2001, a post he held until he retired in 2007.

== Pulitzer Prize ==
Gaines' first Pulitzer Prize came in 1976 as a member of an investigative team at the Tribune looking into unsafe medical practices at some Chicago hospitals.

In 1988, Gaines and colleagues Dean Baquet and Ann Marie Lipinski won the Pulitzer Prize for Investigative Reporting for a series on the self-interest and waste that plagued the Chicago City Council.

Gaines was nominated in 1979 for a series about the problems of the elderly. Gaines and David Jackson were nominated in 1996 for stories that probed questionable business dealings of the Nation of Islam.

== Watergate informant "uncovered" ==
Gaines led a study with several of his students in 2003 to determine the identity of Watergate informant Deep Throat. Soon after the study, he set up a website, about the way in which he "uncovered" one of the great enduring mysteries of modern U.S. Politics.

He came to the conclusion that Fred F. Fielding, a former senior partner at Wiley Rein LLP (then Wiley Rein & Fielding), a Washington, D.C. law firm, was Deep Throat. At the time of the Watergate scandal, Fielding was Associate Counsel for President Richard Nixon from 1970 to 1972, where he was the deputy to John Dean during the Watergate scandal.

On May 31, 2005, the actual Deep Throat, W. Mark Felt, acknowledged his identity in an article in Vanity Fair, exonerating Fielding.

On his website, Deep Throat Uncovered, Gaines has written about a confrontation with John Dean about the identity of Deep Throat:

He declined to respond to Smithsonian Magazine. John Dean has been steadfast in arguing Fielding would not have lied to him about being a source for the Post, and Dean bet Professor Gaines $100 that Gaines was wrong. Gaines took the bet.

== Publications ==
Gaines has written several books:

- Reich, Howard and William Gaines (2004). Jelly's Blues: The Life, Music, and Redemption of Jelly Roll Morton. Da Capo Press ISBN 0-306-81350-5
- Gaines, William (1998). Investigative Reporting for Print and Broadcast Wadsworth Publishing. ISBN 0-8304-1469-X
