= Jack Limpert =

American journalist (1934–2024)

John Arthur Limpert (March 15, 1934 – September 19, 2024) was an American journalist who was editor-in-chief of the Washingtonian for more than 40 years and is credited with shaping the city magazine format.

== Early life ==
Limpert was born in Appleton, Wisconsin and grew up with four older sisters. His father, a paper mill executive, died when he was 10 years old, while his mother managed the household.

He initially enrolled at the University of Wisconsin–Madison, majoring in chemical engineering. After a year, he left the program. He then joined the Air Force, where he was reassigned to a clerk and typist role following a seizure.

After serving for two years, Limpert returned to the University of Wisconsin and earned his bachelor's degree in 1959. He later attended Stanford Law School but left after a year.

== Career ==
Limpert started working for United Press International in 1960 and spent four years there, working in various Midwest bureaus. In 1967 he came to Washington, D.C., to spend a year working for Vice President Hubert Humphrey in a political science fellowship.

=== Washingtonian ===
Limpert started as editor-in-chief of the Washingtonian on January 15, 1969. Michael Schaffer would later describe the magazine at that time as "almost a parody of the New Yorker". The publisher, Laughlin Phillips, gave Limpert "a free hand to shape the magazine".

Limpert pioneered having an annual guide of the top doctors in Washington, which as of 2012, was still the best selling issue.

In 1974, Limpert correctly identified the identity of key Watergate source "Deep Throat" as Mark Felt, the then-deputy director of the FBI. He credited the scandal with making the city more gossipy: "Twenty-five years ago, there was no gossip, but Watergate, Woodward and Bernstein changed all that. Now there is no private life. If you're important enough, journalists will do anything."

Limpert described the Washingtonian's role to The New York Times as: "[Washington] is always changing - it's a city of ambition and education, and people are forever rising up the ladder. A part of what we do is try to tell people who is on the ladder, who is going up and who is going down".

The Washington Post described Limpert's low point as October 1991, when the Washingtonian settled three lawsuits in a few months.

He stepped down as editor-in-chief in 2009, handing the reins over to Garrett Graff. Limpert continued on as an editor at large, performing line edits on every story that would be published until 2012, when he transitioned to being a writer at large.

During Limpert's tenure, the Washingtonian won five National Magazine Awards.

== Personal life ==
Limpert's marriage to Jocelyn Minarik ended in a divorce; they had one son together. In 1975, he married Jean Vincent, with whom he had two daughters.

He died on September 19, 2024, at the age of 90.
