= The FBI Pyramid =

1979 book by W. Mark Felt

The FBI Pyramid: From the Inside
- First edition (publ. Putnam)
- Language: English
- Publisher: Putnam
- Publication date: 1979

The FBI Pyramid: From the Inside is a 1979 non-fiction book by Mark Felt, a former officer of the United States Federal Bureau of Investigation (FBI) who in 2005 revealed that he was "Deep Throat", the Watergate scandal whistleblower who assisted Washington Post reporters Bob Woodward and Carl Bernstein in their investigation, which ultimately led to the resignation of US President Richard Nixon.

Felt was the deputy director of the FBI, the second in command to J. Edgar Hoover and subsequently L. Patrick Gray III. The book chronicles the FBI bureaucracy during the 1960s and 1970s. In the book, Felt denies the notion that he was "Deep Throat". The book was co-written with Hoover biographer and Nixon ally Ralph de Toledano, whose name appears only in the copyright notice. In 2005, Toledano wrote that the volume was "largely written by me since his original manuscript read like The Autocrat of the Breakfast-Table". Toledano also stated that "Felt swore to me that he was not Deep Throat, that he had never leaked information to the Woodward-Bernstein team or anyone else. The book was published and bombed."

Some looked to the book to explain Felt's motivation in assisting the Washington Post journalists. It gained interest in 2005 with the revelation that Felt was Deep Throat. An updated edition was published in 2006 as A G-Man's Life, co-written by John O'Connor.
