= J. Edgar Hoover (film) =

1987 biographical drama television film by Robert L. Collins

- Genre: Biography; Drama
- Based on: The Bureau: My 30 Years in Hoover's FBI by: William C. Sullivan; William S. Brown
- Written by: Robert L. Collins
- Directed by: Robert L. Collins
- Starring: Treat Williams
- Music by: J. Peter Robinson
- Country of origin: United States
- Original language: English

Production
- Executive producers: Bill Finnegan; Patricia Finnegan; Sheldon Pinchuk
- Producer: Robert L. Collins
- Cinematography: Tim Suhrstedt
- Editor: Patrick Kennedy
- Running time: 108 minutes
- Production companies: Finnegan/Pinchuk Productions; RLC Productions; Showtime Networks

Original release
- Network: Showtime
- Release: January 11, 1987

J. Edgar Hoover is a 1987 American biographical drama television film written and directed by Robert L. Collins. It stars Treat Williams as the eponymous J. Edgar Hoover, the long-serving (1924 - 1972) Director of the Federal Bureau of Investigation. The film is based on the 1979 book The Bureau: My 30 Years in Hoover's FBI by William C. Sullivan and William S. Brown, and dramatizes key points in Hoover's life between the time he joined the U.S. Justice Department in 1919 and 1970. It aired on Showtime on January 11, 1987.

== Cast ==
- Treat Williams - J. Edgar Hoover
- Robert Alan Browne - Gaston Means
- Mark Carlton - 1st Agent
- Andrew Duggan - Dwight D. Eisenhower
- Louise Fletcher - Annie M. Hoover
- Charles Hallahan - Joseph McCarthy
- Art Hindle - John F. Kennedy
- Erik Holland - William J. Burns
- James F. Kelly - Robert F. Kennedy (one of seven appearances as RFK)
- Paul Kent - Harry M. Daugherty
- Lee Kessler - Helen Gandy
- Charles Levin - Producer
- John McLiam - A. Mitchell Palmer
- F.J. O'Neil - Harry Vaughn
- Ford Rainey - Harlan Fiske Stone
- Joe Regalbuto - William C. Sullivan
- David Ogden Stiers - Franklin D. Roosevelt
- William Traylor - Nicholas Katzenbach
- Harvey Vernon - Senator George W. Norris
- Mills Watson - Senator Kenneth McKellar
- Anthony Palmer - Richard M. Nixon
- Rip Torn - Lyndon B. Johnson
- Don Draper - Maitre d'
- Paul Keith - Doctor
- Gracia Lee - Annie
- Cliff Murdock - Carl Mathews
- Michael Griswold - Congressman Hale Boggs
- Walker Edmiston - Harry S. Truman
- Robert Harper - Clyde Tolson
