= Barry Sussman =

American editor, author, and public opinion analyst (1934–2022)

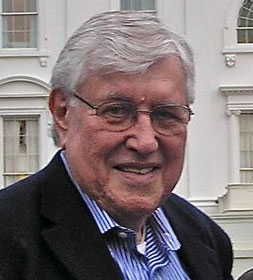
- Born: July 10, 1934; Brooklyn, New York, U.S.
- Died: June 1, 2022 (aged 87); Rockville, Maryland, U.S.
- Education: Brooklyn College
- Occupations: Editor, author, opinion analyst
- Spouse: Peggy Earhart
- Children: 2

Barry Sussman (July 10, 1934 – June 1, 2022) was an American editor, author, and public opinion analyst who dealt primarily with public policy issues. He was city news editor at The Washington Post at the time of the Watergate break-in and supervised much of the reporting on the Watergate scandal.

== Career ==
After receiving a degree in English and history from Brooklyn College in 1956, Sussman worked for a New York City advertising agency. He began his career in journalism in 1960 as a reporter at the Bristol (Va.-Tenn.) Herald Courier, a daily with a circulation of about 25,000. He left after 16 months, but soon returned as managing editor. before joining The Washington Post in 1965. He was a state-suburban editor, then DC editor, with a staff of 40 to 45 reporters.

Sussman was city editor at The Washington Post at the time of the Watergate scandal, and was detached to direct the coverage that led to the Post being awarded the Pulitzer Prize for Public Service in 1973. While initially a close supervisor of the journalists Bob Woodward and Carl Bernstein involved in the Post's coverage of Watergate, Sussman later became estranged from them.

After Watergate, Sussman founded the Washington Post poll, designing and conducting opinion surveys and reporting on the results. In 1981 the Post put him in charge of establishing and directing the Washington Post/ABC News poll, again designing surveys and doing most of the reporting on the findings. Sussman left the Post in 1987 to become managing editor for national news at United Press International (UPI), in charge of 800 reporters and editors across the U.S., and 40 more in UPI's Washington, D.C. bureau.

Sussman left UPI after less than one year, however, and became an independent pollster, continuing to focus on public policy issues. His clients included trade associations, the AFL–CIO and other interest groups. In the 1990s, he became active as an international news media consultant, with assignments at newspapers in Spain, Portugal and seven Latin American countries.

From 2003 to 2012, Sussman was the editor of Nieman Watchdog, a watchdog journalism project of the Nieman Foundation for Journalism at Harvard University, which focuses on public policy reporting. He was a board member of the group Innovation Media Consulting. Sussman is one of the journalists profiled at Investigating Power, a website covering events in recent American history.

In September 2011, Sussman was the recipient of a lifetime achievement award from Brooklyn College, his alma mater. Among other awards, Sussman was named editor of the year by the Washington-Baltimore Newspaper Guild for his work on Watergate.

== Death ==
Sussman died on June 1, 2022, at his home in Rockville, Maryland, due to gastrointestinal bleeding.

== Books ==
- The Great Coverup: Nixon and the Scandal of Watergate ISBN 0-9831140-0-5 ISBN 0-451-62130-1
- What Americans Really Think ISBN 978-0-394-56303-9
- Maverick: A Life in Politics ISBN 978-0-316-92814-4

His book, The Great Coverup: Nixon and the Scandal of Watergate, was named by The New York Times as one of the best books of the year in 1974. He is also the author of What Americans Really Think, published by Pantheon in 1988, based on columns he wrote while pollster and public opinion analyst at The Washington Post, and Maverick: A Life in Politics, written with and about the former U.S. Senator and Governor of Connecticut, Lowell P. Weicker Jr., published in 1995 by Little, Brown.
