= Charles Nuzum =

Charles "Charlie" A. Nuzum (1923 – 2 August 2008) was an agent of the FBI who oversaw the investigation into the Watergate scandal. Nuzum was chief of the FBI's bankruptcy, antitrust and wiretapping unit at the time of the break-in at the Watergate office.

== Early life ==
Charles Nuzum was born in Bourbon County, Kansas, in 1923. When Nuzum was a child, his family moved to St. Petersburg, Florida. When World War II started Nuzum was attending St. Petersburg Junior College, later serving as a pilot flying a B-24 in the Army Air forces. Charles won some awards including Distinguished Flying Cross, Air Medal and the Purple Heart award. In 1948 he graduated from the University of Michigan and later joined the FBI in 1954. Nuzum moved to Washington in the early 1960s. Nuzum had a wife, Joy L. Nuzum, and two children, Charles Nuzum Jr. and Denise Perrino.

== Involvement with Watergate ==
At the time of the Watergate scandal, Mr. Nuzum was chief of the FBI's bankruptcy, antitrust, and wiretapping unit. Nuzum lead the investigation into the Watergate burglary. The investigation revealed that the White House was connected to the burglary, and the burglary to an ever so expanding set of other numerous crimes, taken under to punish the so-called political enemies of Nixon's administration. Nuzum would inform his superiors, which also included Robert Gebhardt, the FBI's assistant director of the investigative division. Robert Gebhardt then would send the reports to the FBI's associate director, Mark Felt. Felt then passed the information on to L. Patrick Gray, the FBI’s acting director. Many of the key memos from this period contain the name and initials of Charles Nuzum.

== Retirement ==
In 1975, Charles Nuzum retired. Shortly after retiring, Nuzum returned to Florida and became employed by the Department of Business and Professional Regulation, as a state beverage division chief. At the time of his retirement in 1983, he was president of the National Conference of State Liquor Administrators. Nuzum was also a valued member of the "Society of Former Special Agents of the FBI."

== Death ==
In 2008, Nuzum suffered an accidental fall. He was hospitalized at Tallahassee Memorial Hospital, where he died on August 2.
