= John P. Mohr =

- Born: John Philip Mohr; April 20, 1910
- Died: January 25, 1997 (aged 86)
- Occupation: FBI assistant to Director for Administrative Affairs

John Philip Mohr (20 April 1910 – 25 January 1997) was an administrator with the Federal Bureau of Investigation.

As Assistant to the Director for Administrative Affairs, he was one of the officials chiefly responsible for the proper implementation of procurement requirements and procedures.

He retired on 30 June 1972 as the FBI's No. 4 man.

In January 1978, United States Attorney General Griffin Bell issued a public report summarizing an investigation into alleged misuse of FBI funds in a "Confidential Fund." Mohr, Clyde Tolson, and FBI Director J. Edgar Hoover could authorize disbursements from this fund, and it was found that Mohr had directed employees of the Exhibit Section to make numerous repairs and improvements of property owned by him and his family.

The report states:

(a) Mr. Mohr was Assistant Director for the Administrative Division of the FBI and the Assistant to the Director. He was primarily responsible for using USRC as an exclusive supplier of electronics equipment to the FBI. His conduct toward USRC violated 28 C.F.R. § 045.735-2(b) and (c)(2) (prohibiting employees from giving preferential treatment to any person outside the Department). He received a few gratuities (tape deck, Christmas gifts) from Mr. Tait. No evidence was found that he was bribed, but he violated 945.735-14(a)(1), which prohibits employees from accepting gifts from those doing business with the Department.

(b) FBI employees provided goods and services to him as described above. This arguably violated 18 U.S.C. 641 (conversion of government property to his own use), (prosecution barred by the statute of limitations), and 28 C.F.R. §45.735-16 (misuse of federal property).

(c) Mr. Mohr was also responsible, along with Mr. Callahan, for using FBI Recreation Association and Confidential Fund monies for unauthorized public relations purposes. This matter has been referred to the Department's office of Management and Finance for appropriate action (see footnote 12 above). In 1972, he attended an expense paid hunting weekend at Remington Farms, an FBI arms supplier. This is a violation of the Department prohibition against accepting gifts from those doing business with the Department, 28 C.F.R. §45.735-14(a)(1).

(d) No action has been taken against Mr. Mohr. He retired on June 30, 1972. Criminal action under all of the above federal provisions is barred by the five year statute of limitations.
