= Washingtonian (magazine) =

American magazine

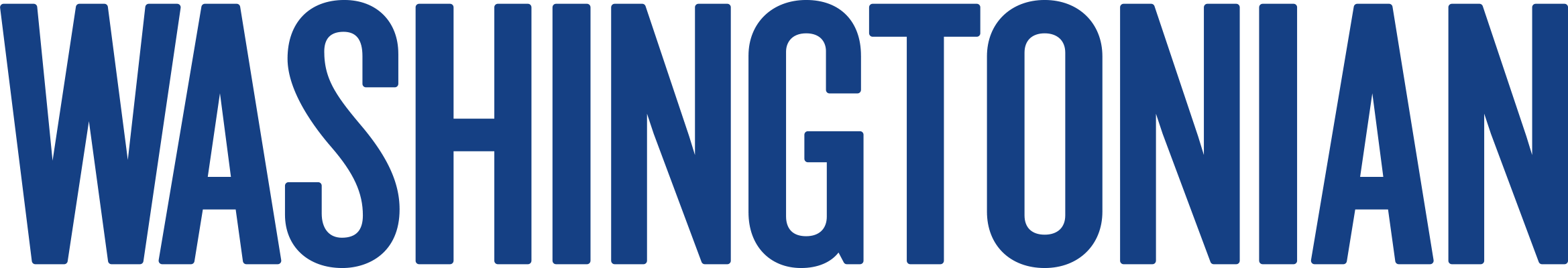
- Editor: Sherri Dalphonse
- Frequency: Monthly
- Publisher: Catherine Merrill Williams
- Total circulation: 118,339 (2017)
- Founder: Laughlin Phillips; Robert J. Myers
- First issue: 1965; 61 years ago
- Company: Washingtonian Magazine, Inc.
- Country: United States
- Based in: Washington, D.C., U.S.
- Language: English
- Website: washingtonian.com
- ISSN: 0043-0897
- OCLC: 37264488

Washingtonian is a monthly regional magazine distributed in the Washington, D.C. area, with a focus on local feature journalism, guide book-style articles, real estate, and politics. Founded in 1965 by Laughlin Phillips and Robert J. Myers, the general interest publication describes itself as "The Magazine Washington Lives By."

As of 2026, Washingtonian has hundreds of thousands of readers, including a paid circulation of more than 93,000.

== Content ==
Washingtonian publishes information about local professionals, businesses, and notable places in Washington, D.C. It also releases rankings of notable individuals in the area.

Each issue includes information on popular local attractions, such as restaurants, neighborhoods, and entertainment. There is regular in-depth feature reporting on local institutions, politicians, businessmen, academics, and philanthropists.

Since 1971, the magazine has annually nominated up to 15 people as "Washingtonians of the Year." The magazine describes the award as honoring men and women "who give their time and talents to make this a better place."

Washingtonian has won five National Magazine Awards.

== Leadership ==
In 2009, the magazine announced that Garrett Graff would replace long-time editor Jack Limpert as editor-in-chief. Graff left in 2014 and was replaced by Michael Schaffer. In 2022, Sherri Dalphonse took over for Schaffer as editor-in-chief, becoming the first woman to hold the title of top editor.

Washingtonian is a family-owned publication. The former CEO was Philip Merrill (1934-2006), who was succeeded as chairman by his wife, Eleanor; their daughter Catherine Merrill Williams is the president and publisher.

== See also ==
- List of newspapers in Washington, D.C.
