= L. Patrick Gray =

American lawyer (1916–2005)

Patrick Gray
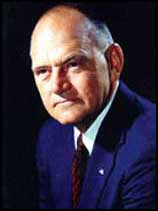

Director of the Federal Bureau of Investigation
- Acting
- In office May 3, 1972 – April 27, 1973
- President: Richard Nixon
- Preceded by: Clyde Tolson (acting)
- Succeeded by: William Ruckelshaus (acting)

United States Assistant Attorney General for the Civil Division
- In office 1970–1972
- President: Richard Nixon
- Preceded by: William Ruckelshaus
- Succeeded by: Harlington Wood Jr.

Personal details
- Born: Louis Patrick Gray III; July 18, 1916 St. Louis, Missouri, U.S.
- Died: July 6, 2005 (aged 88) Atlantic Beach, Florida, U.S.
- Party: Republican
- Spouse: Beatrice Castle Kirk (m. 1946)
- Children: 4 (2 adopted)
- Education: Rice University (attended); United States Naval Academy (BS); George Washington University (JD)

Military service
- Allegiance: United States
- Branch: United States Navy
- Service years: 1940–1960
- Rank: Captain
- Conflicts: World War II; Korean War

Louis Patrick Gray III (July 18, 1916 – July 6, 2005) was acting director of the Federal Bureau of Investigation (FBI) from May 3, 1972, to April 27, 1973. During this time, the FBI was in charge of the initial investigation into the burglaries that sparked the Watergate scandal, which eventually led to the resignation of President Nixon. Gray was nominated as permanent director by Nixon on February 15, 1973, but failed to win Senate confirmation. He resigned as acting director on April 27, 1973, after admitting to destroying documents that had come from convicted Watergate conspirator E. Howard Hunt's safe—documents received on June 28, 1972, 11 days after the Watergate burglary, and given to Gray by White House counsel John Dean.

Gray remained publicly silent about the Watergate scandal for 32 years, speaking to the press only once, near the end of his life; this was shortly after Gray's direct subordinate at the FBI, FBI Deputy Director Mark Felt, revealed himself to have been the secret source to The Washington Post known as "Deep Throat".

== Early life and education ==
Gray was born on July 18, 1916, in St. Louis, Missouri, the eldest son of Louis Patrick Gray Jr., a Texas railroad worker. He worked three jobs while attending schools in St. Louis and Houston, Texas, graduating from St. Thomas High School in 1932, at the age of 16 (having skipped two grades). Gray initially attended Rice University; however, his true goal was to be admitted to the United States Naval Academy. He was finally admitted to the Naval Academy in 1936 and he immediately dropped out of Rice University in his senior year so he could attend.

At the time, however, Gray could not afford the bus or train fare to Annapolis, so he hired on as an apprentice seaman on a tramp steamer out of Galveston. During the journey to Philadelphia (the closest the steamer could get him to Maryland), Gray taught calculus to the ship's captain, a Bulgarian named Frank Solis, in return for basic lessons in navigation. Once in Philadelphia, Gray hitchhiked to Annapolis.

Once at the academy, Gray walked onto the football team as the starting quarterback, played varsity lacrosse and boxed as a light heavyweight. In 1940, Gray received a Bachelor of Science degree from the Naval Academy.

== Naval career ==
The United States Navy commissioned Gray as a line officer, and he served through five submarine war patrols in the Pacific Ocean theater of World War II. He suffered a ruptured appendix at the start of his sixth patrol and was unable to get to a hospital for 17 days, an ordeal that should have killed him. In 1945, Gray visited Beatrice Castle Kirk (1923–2019), the widow of his Naval Academy classmate, Lieutenant Commander Edward Emmet DeGarmo (1917–1945). They were married in 1946. He adopted her two sons, Alan and Ed; and they had two of their own, Patrick and Stephen.

In 1949, Gray received a Juris Doctor degree from George Washington University Law School, where he edited the law review and became a member of the Order of the Coif. He was admitted to practice before the Washington, D.C., Bar in 1949; later, he was admitted to practice law by the Connecticut State Bar, the United States Court of Appeals for the Armed Forces, the United States courts of appeals, the United States Court of Claims, and the Supreme Court of the United States.

By 1960, Gray's achievements in the Navy included commanding the U.S.S. Tiru (SS-416) and two other submarines on war patrols during the Korean War; earning the rank of captain two years before he was legally allowed to be paid for it; and serving as congressional liaison officer for the United States Secretary of Defense, the Chairman of the Joint Chiefs of Staff, and the Chief of Naval Operations. He indicated his desire to retire from the Navy, but Chief of Naval Operations Arleigh Burke told him, "If you stay, you'll have my job some day." He did not stay, but joined a Connecticut law firm in 1961.

== Department of Justice ==
In 1969, Gray returned to the federal government and worked under the Nixon administration in several different positions. In 1970, President Nixon appointed him as Assistant Attorney General for the Civil Division in the Department of Justice. In 1972, Gray was nominated to be Deputy Attorney General, but before he could be confirmed by the full United States Senate his nomination was withdrawn.

== Acting Director of FBI ==
Instead, President Nixon designated him as Acting Director of the FBI after the death of J. Edgar Hoover. Gray served for less than a year. Day-to-day operational command of the Bureau remained with Associate Director Mark Felt.

== Watergate involvement ==
=== Watergate and the FBI's investigation ===
On June 17, 1972, just six weeks after Gray took office at the FBI, five men were arrested after breaking into the Democratic National Committee headquarters at the Watergate hotel complex in Washington, D.C.

Gray first learned of the Watergate break-ins on June 17 from Wes Grapp, the Special Agent in Charge of the Los Angeles field office. Gray immediately called Mark Felt, his second in command. At the time, Felt only had limited information, remaining unclear as to whether it was a burglary or bombing attempt.

Felt had more information the next day, when he informed Gray that the burglars had connections to the Committee for the Re-Election of the President (CRP), that one burglar (McCord) was head of security for the committee, and that at least one listening device had been found. Gray recalled the conversation concluding with the exchange:

"Are you absolutely certain that we have jurisdiction?" I asked.

"I'm sure of it," he [Felt] answered.

"Just check it and be absolutely certain," I ordered. "And then investigate it to the hilt with no holds barred."

On the same day, June 18, 1972, Gray also met later-identified Watergate conspirator Fred LaRue in California. The two discussed Watergate, according to LaRue, and made arrangements to meet again back in Washington, D.C. In his own memoir, Gray relates the LaRue meeting as a chance encounter at a hotel swimming pool and quotes their entire Watergate-related conversation:

"The Watergate thing is a hell of a thing," he said.

"You bet it is, Fred," I answered. "We're going to investigate the hell out of it."

That was all either of us said about it.

For the first six months of the investigation, Gray remained heavily involved. It was only when it became apparent that the White House was involved that Gray recused himself from the investigation and handed control over to Felt.

=== Cover-up ===
On June 23, 1972, White House Chief of Staff Bob Haldeman and President Nixon held one of the infamous "smoking gun" conversations in which they conspired to use the CIA to block the FBI investigation into the money trail leading from the Watergate burglars to the Committee to Re-elect the President, which would constitute hard evidence that Committee members were involved in the planning of the burglaries.

According to Gray, this plan was first put into action when he had a meeting with Vernon Walters, then deputy director of the CIA, in which he quotes Walters as saying, "If the investigation gets pushed further south of the border… it could trespass onto some of our covert projects. Since you've got these five men under arrest, it will be best to taper the matter off here." This conversation implicitly stated that the FBI should not interview Manuel Ogarrio and Kenneth Dahlberg, individuals connected with the money used to fund the Watergate burglars.

This would later be backed up by the Director of the CIA, Richard Helms, when he specifically told Gray that Karl Wagner and John Caswell should also not be interviewed, as they were, he stated, active CIA agents at the time.

The basis for such a request came from a long-standing understanding between the CIA and the FBI that they would not reveal each other's informants. This effort by the White House and the CIA succeeded in delaying the interviews of both Ogarrio and Dahlberg for a little more than one week, at which point Gray and his senior FBI staff, including Mark Felt, Charlie Bates, and Bob Kunkel, decided that, due to the increasing importance of these individuals in the investigation, they needed a written request from the CIA not to interview them, which would have to state in greater detail the reasons for not interviewing these individuals. Once the decision was made, Gray called Vernon Walters and demanded that written request the next morning, or he would order the interviews to go forth.

The next morning, Walters arrived and delivered a three-page memorandum, marked "SECRET", that did not ask the FBI to hold off on the interviews. The meeting concluded with Walters suggesting to Gray that he should warn the President that some members of the White House staff were hindering the FBI's investigation. After the conversation, Gray ordered the interviews to proceed immediately.

Ultimately, the CIA cover-up delayed the FBI investigation no more than two weeks.

While not active in any Watergate activities per se, Gray was aware through his dealings with John Dean that the White House was concerned about what might be discovered from a full-field FBI investigation and explored what he could do to limit the investigation or shift it away from the Bureau's jurisdiction. As Dean wrote in his Watergate memoir Blind Ambition, he used Gray as a shill knowing that "we could count on Pat Gray to keep the Hunt material from becoming public, and he did not disappoint us." In fact, even though Gray thought of this as a political and not criminal situation and that he was ultimately serving the President as the "nation's chief law enforcement officer," Gray would come dangerously close to collusion because he chose to be useful to the White House without asking the hard questions. Dean goes on to say, "I met Pat Gray secretly at his home in southwest Washington. We were both apprehensive about the meeting as we walked to a park and sat down on a bench overlooking the Potomac, discussing my request to obtain FBI 302s and AirTels on the Watergate investigation."

=== Felt and the search for the source ===
The Nixon White House tapes reveal that Bob Haldeman told Nixon that Felt was the source of leaks of confidential information contained in the FBI's investigation to various members of the press, including Bob Woodward of The Washington Post. Gray claimed that he resisted five separate demands from the White House to fire Felt, stating that he believed Felt's assurances that he was not the source. Eventually, Gray demanded to know who was claiming Felt to be leaking. Attorney General Richard Kleindienst told Gray that Roswell Gilpatric, former deputy secretary of defense under John F. Kennedy and now outside general counsel to Time, had told John Mitchell that Felt was leaking to Sandy Smith of Time magazine.

After Felt admitted in the May 2005 Vanity Fair article that he lied to Gray about leaking to the press, Gray claimed that Felt's bitterness at being passed over for the FBI directorship was the cause of his decision to leak to Time, The Washington Post, and others.

=== Confirmation hearings ===
In 1973, Gray was nominated as Hoover's permanent successor as head of the FBI. This action by Nixon confounded many, coming at a time when revelations of involvement by Nixon administration officials in the Watergate scandal were coming to the forefront. Under Gray's direction, the FBI had been accused of mishandling the investigation into the break-in, doing a cursory job and refusing to investigate the possible involvement of administration officials. Gray's Senate confirmation hearing was to become the Senate's first opportunity to ask pertinent questions about the Watergate investigation.

During the confirmation hearing, Gray defended the bureau's investigation. During questioning, he volunteered that he had provided copies of some of the files on the investigation to White House Counsel John Dean, who had told Gray he was conducting an investigation for the President. Gray testified that before turning over the files to Dean, he had been advised by the FBI's own legal counsel that he was required by law to comply with Dean's order. He confirmed that the FBI investigation supported claims made by The Washington Post and other sources about "dirty tricks" committed and funded by the Committee to Re-Elect the President, and in particular, activities of questionable legality committed by Donald Segretti. The White House had for months steadfastly denied any involvement in such activities.

During the hearings, Gray testified that Dean had "probably lied" to the FBI, increasing the suspicions of many of a cover-up. The Nixon administration was so angered by this statement that John Ehrlichman told Dean that Gray should be left to "twist slowly, slowly in the wind."

=== Destruction of documents and resignation from the FBI ===
On June 21, 1972, Gray met with John Dean and John Ehrlichman in Ehrlichman's office. During this meeting, Gray was handed several envelopes full of documents from the personal safe of E. Howard Hunt. Dean instructed Gray, in the presence of Ehrlichman, that the documents were "national security documents. These should never see the light of day." Dean further repeatedly told Gray that the documents were not Watergate-related.

Six months later, Gray said he finally looked at the papers as he burned them in a Connecticut fireplace. "The first set of papers in there were false top-secret cables indicating that the Kennedy administration had much to do with the assassination of the Vietnamese president (Diem)," Gray said. "The second set of papers in there were letters purportedly written by Senator Kennedy involving some of his peccadilloes, if you will."

After learning from Ehrlichman that Dean was cooperating with the US Attorney and would be revealing what happened on June 21, Gray told his staunchest congressional supporter, Senator Lowell Weicker, so that he might be prepared for that revelation. As a result, Weicker leaked this revelation to some chosen reporters.

Following this revelation, Gray was forced to resign from the FBI on April 27, 1973.

== Legal struggles ==
For the next eight years, Gray defended his actions as Acting Director of the FBI, testifying before five federal grand juries and four committees of Congress.

On October 7, 1975, the Watergate Special Prosecutor informed Gray that the last Watergate-related investigation of him had been formally closed. Gray was never indicted in relation to Watergate, but the scandal dogged him afterwards.

In 1978, Gray was indicted, along with Assistant Director Edward Miller, for allegedly having approved illegal break-ins during the Nixon administration. Gray vehemently denied the charges, which were dropped in 1980. Felt and Miller, who had approved the illegal break-ins during the tenures of four separate FBI directors, including Hoover, Gray, William Ruckelshaus, and Clarence M. Kelley, were convicted and later pardoned by President Ronald Reagan. Exonerated by the Department of Justice after a two-year investigation, Gray returned to his law practice in Connecticut.

== Later life and death ==
After his time in Washington, Gray returned to practicing law at the firm of Suisman, Shapiro, Wool, Brennan, Gray & Greenberg in New London, Connecticut.

In a 2005 Vanity Fair article, Mark Felt claimed to be Deep Throat, the infamous source of leaks to Bob Woodward and Carl Bernstein. Woodward, Bernstein, and Post executive editor Benjamin C. Bradlee confirmed the claim. Gray spoke about the Watergate scandal for the first time in 32 years on June 26, 2005, ten days before his death from pancreatic cancer. He told ABC's This Week that he was in "total shock, total disbelief" when asked about Felt's claim. "It was like I was hit with a tremendous sledgehammer."

Gray died on July 6, 2005.

He was working on his memoirs with his stepson Edward Gray, using his extensive and never-released personal Watergate files. His stepson finished the book In Nixon's Web: A Year in the Crosshairs of Watergate, which disputes the claim that Felt was Deep Throat, citing Woodward's own notes and other evidence as proof that Deep Throat was a fictional composite made up of several Woodward sources, only one of whom was Felt.

=== Gray and the New York Times ===
In 2009, Bob Phelps, a former editor of The New York Times, and Robert M. Smith, a former reporter for the Times, claimed that they had received information from Gray that would have allowed the Times to break the Watergate story before The Washington Post, but they failed to act upon it.

In August 1972, Gray and Smith had lunch. According to Smith, during this lunch Gray mentioned details of Donald Segretti and John Mitchell's involvement in the Watergate burglaries.

After the lunch, Smith reportedly rushed to his editor, Phelps, with the story, but it amounted to nothing. Smith left his job the next day for Yale Law School, and Phelps lost track of the story while covering the 1972 Republican Convention.

However, while only Gray and Smith knew exactly what was said at that lunch, Gray's son, Edward, denies that his father could have implicated either the Attorney General or the President.

Gray goes on to point out that at the time of this lunch the Attorney General was Richard Kleindienst, who was never implicated in any of the Watergate scandals. Even if Smith meant that he was talking about John Mitchell, the former Attorney General, Gray further points out that no one (outside of the conspirators) knew of Mitchell's involvement until the following April, when John Dean admitted as much to special prosecutors.

== Documents ==
Gray was a meticulous record-keeper, which is most easily evidenced by the 40 boxes of personal records he took with him from his year with the FBI. The archive would grow even after Gray left the FBI as a direct result of the legal proceedings in which he was forced to take part in the years to follow.

This archive has become what is undoubtedly the "most complete set of Watergate investigative records outside the government."

== Selected Navy awards ==
- American Defense Service Medal
- American Campaign Medal
- Asiatic–Pacific Campaign Medal
- World War II Victory Medal
- National Defense Service Medal
- Korean Service Medal
- United Nations Korea Medal

== See also ==
- Helen Gandy

== Notes ==
Government offices
Preceded by J. Edgar Hoover	Director of the Federal Bureau of Investigation; Acting; 1972–1973	Succeeded by William Ruckelshaus; Acting
