= Deep Throat (Watergate) =

Pseudonym given to the informant Mark Felt

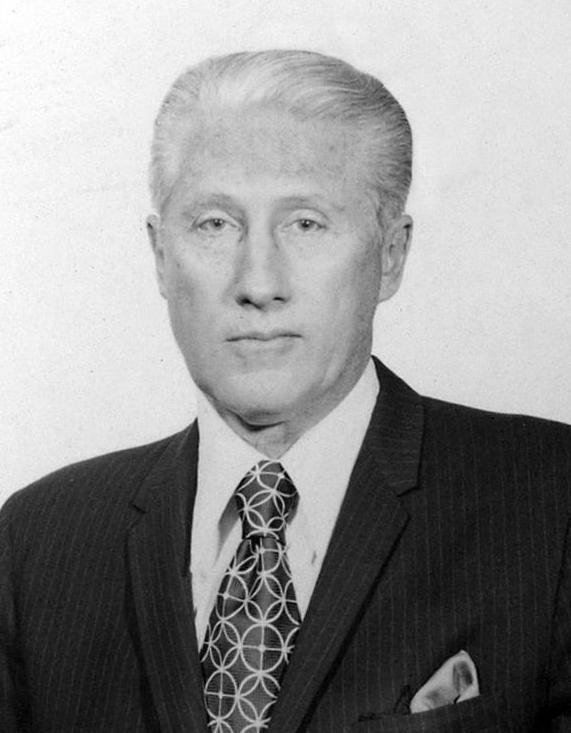
Mark Felt, the secret identity of Deep Throat

Deep Throat was the pseudonym given to Mark Felt, the secret informant who provided key details about the involvement of U.S. president Richard Nixon's administration in what came to be known as the Watergate scandal to reporter Bob Woodward in 1972, which was later shared with Carl Bernstein. At the time, Felt was Deputy Director of the FBI, and Woodward and Bernstein were reporters for The Washington Post.

In 2005, 31 years after Nixon's resignation and 11 years after Nixon's death, Felt revealed through an attorney that he was Deep Throat. By then, Felt was suffering from dementia and had previously denied being Deep Throat, but Woodward and Bernstein then confirmed the attorney's claim. Although Felt's identity remained unknown to the public for over 30 years, White House tape recordings released in 1996 reveal that Nixon had been privately informed that Felt was the source as early as October 1972.

== Background ==
Deep Throat was first introduced to the public in the February 1974 book All the President's Men by The Washington Post reporters Bob Woodward and Carl Bernstein. According to the authors, Deep Throat was a key source of information behind a series of articles that introduced the misdeeds of the Nixon administration to the general public. The scandal eventually led to the resignation of President Nixon, as well as to prison terms for White House Chief of Staff H. R. Haldeman, G. Gordon Liddy, Egil Krogh, White House Counsel Charles Colson, former United States Attorney General John N. Mitchell, former White House Counsel John Dean, and presidential adviser John Ehrlichman. The film based on the book was released two years later; nominated for eight Academy Awards, it won four.

In his notes, Woodward referred to his source as "X" or "MF" for "my friend", but due to the deep background status of his information, Washington Post managing editor Howard Simons dubbed him "Deep Throat" in an allusion to the 1972 adult film of the same name. For more than 30 years, Deep Throat's identity was one of the biggest mysteries of American politics and journalism and the source of much public curiosity and speculation. Woodward and Bernstein insisted that they would not reveal his identity until he died or consented to reveal it. J. Anthony Lukas speculated that Deep Throat was W. Mark Felt in his book Nightmare: The Underside of the Nixon Years (1976), based on three New York Times Sunday Magazine articles, but he was widely criticized. According to an article in Slate on April 28, 2003, Woodward had denied that Deep Throat was part of the "intelligence community" in a 1989 Playboy interview with Lukas.

On May 31, 2005, Vanity Fair revealed that Felt was Deep Throat in an article on its website by John D. O'Connor, an attorney acting on Felt's behalf. Felt reportedly said, "I'm the guy they used to call Deep Throat." After the Vanity Fair story broke, Woodward, Bernstein, and Benjamin C. Bradlee, the Post's executive editor during Watergate, confirmed Felt's identity as Deep Throat. L. Patrick Gray, former acting Director of the FBI and Felt's overseer, disputed Felt's claim in his book In Nixon's Web, co-written with his son Ed. Gray and others have argued that Deep Throat was a compilation of sources characterized as one person to improve sales of the book and movie. Woodward and Bernstein, however, defended Felt's claims and detailed their relationship with him in Woodward's book The Secret Man: The Story of Watergate's Deep Throat.

== Role in the Watergate scandal ==
On June 17, 1972, police arrested five men inside the offices of the Democratic National Committee in the Watergate Complex in Washington, D.C. In their possession were $2,300 (equivalent to $17,700 today), plastic gloves to prevent fingerprints, burglary tools, a walkie-talkie and radio scanner capable of listening to police frequencies, cameras with 40 rolls of film, tear gas guns, multiple electronic devices which they intended to plant in the Democratic Committee offices, and notebooks containing the telephone number of White House official E. Howard Hunt. One of the men was James W. McCord Jr., a former Central Intelligence Agency employee and a security man for Nixon's Committee for the Re-Election of the President, later notoriously mocked with the acronym "CREEP".

Washington Post reporters Carl Bernstein and Bob Woodward pursued the story for two years. The scandal eventually implicated many members of Nixon's White House, culminating in Nixon becoming the first United States president to resign. Woodward and Bernstein wrote in All the President's Men that key information in their investigation had come from an anonymous informant whom they dubbed "Deep Throat".

=== Methods of communication ===
Woodward, in All the President's Men, first mentions "Deep Throat" on page 71. Earlier in the book, he reports calling "an old friend and sometimes source who worked for the federal government and did not like to be called at his office". Later, he describes him as "a source in the Executive Branch who had access to information at CRP as well as at the White House". The book also calls him "an incurable gossip" and states "in a unique position to observe the Executive Branch", and as a man "whose fight had been worn out in too many battles".

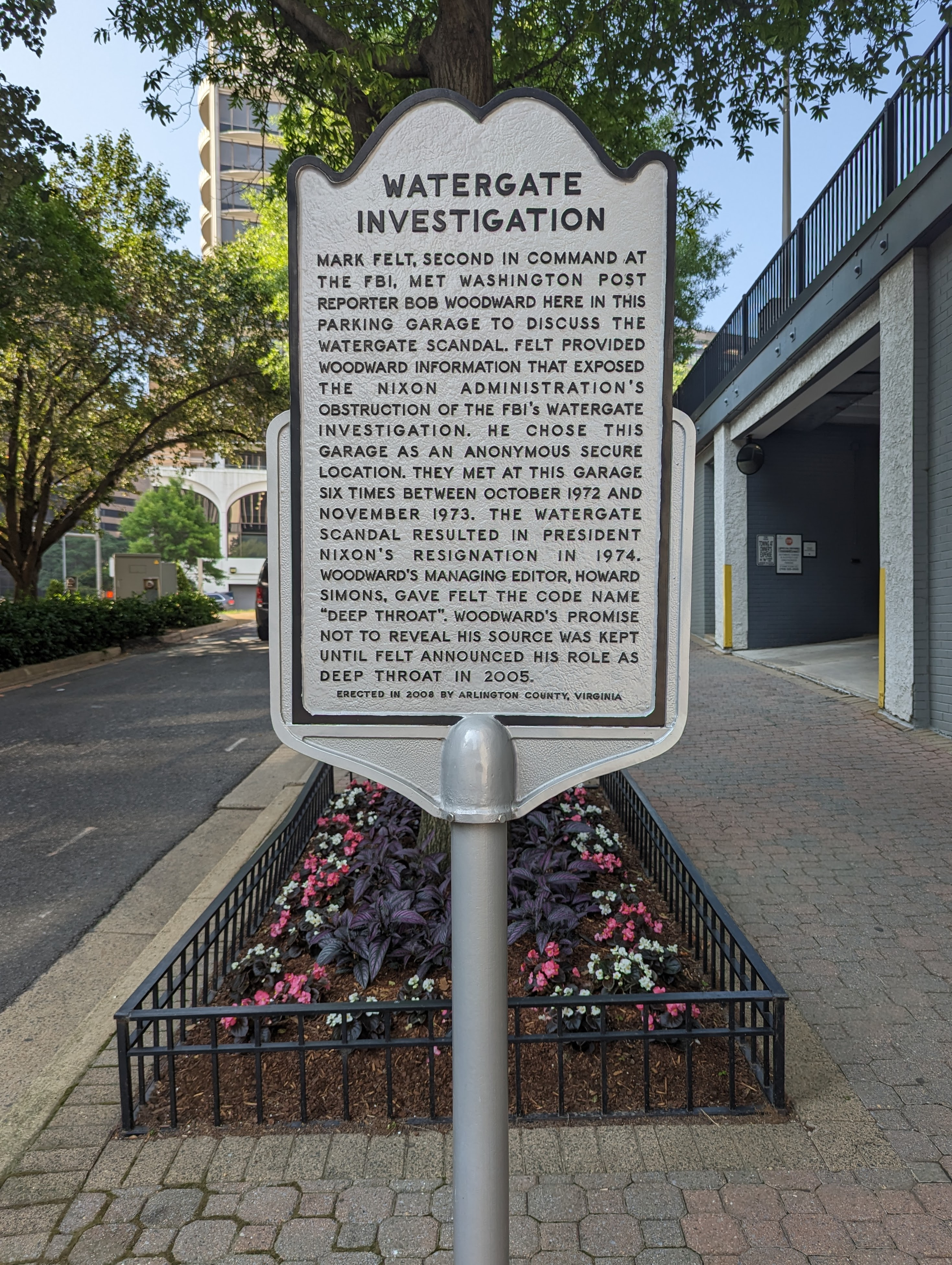
Historical marker in front of the parking garage in Rosslyn, Virginia, where Woodward and Felt met during the Washington Post's Watergate scandal investigation

Woodward claimed that he would signal to "Deep Throat" that he desired a meeting by moving a flowerpot with a small red flag on the balcony of his high-rise apartment. On occasions when "Deep Throat" wanted a meeting, he would make special marks on page 20 of Woodward's copy of The New York Times; he would circle the page number and draw clock hands to indicate the hour. They often met "on the bottom level of an underground garage just over the Key Bridge in Rosslyn", at 2:00 a.m. The garage is located at 1401 Wilson Boulevard and has a historical marker that was erected in 2011. In 2014, the garage was scheduled to be demolished, though the county decided to save the historical marker, and the landowner promised to design a memorial commemorating the Watergate scandal. As of 2026, the garage had not been demolished.

Many were skeptical of these cloak and dagger methods. Adrian Havill investigated these claims for his 1993 biography of Woodward and Bernstein and found them to be factually impossible. He noted that Woodward's apartment 617 at 1718 P Street, Northwest, in Washington faced an interior courtyard and was not visible from the street. Havill said that anyone regularly checking the balcony, as "Deep Throat" was said to have done daily, would have been spotted. Havill also said that copies of The New York Times were not delivered to individual apartments but delivered in an unaddressed stack to the building's reception desk. There would have been no way to know which copy was intended for Woodward. Woodward, however, has stated that in the early 1970s the interior courtyard was an alleyway and had not yet been bricked off and that his balcony was visible from street level to passing pedestrians. It was also visible, Woodward conjectured, to anyone from the FBI in surveillance of nearby embassies. Also revealed was the fact that Woodward's copy of The New York Times had his apartment number indicated on it. Former neighbor Herman Knippenberg stated that Woodward would sometimes come to his door looking for his marked copy of the Times, claiming, "I like to have it in mint condition and I like to have my own copy."

Further, while Woodward stressed these precautions in his book, he also admits to having called "Deep Throat" on the telephone at his home. Felt's wife recalls answering Woodward's telephone calls for Felt.

=== Controversy over motives ===
In public statements following the disclosure of his identity, Felt's family called him an "American hero", stating that he leaked information about the Watergate scandal to The Washington Post for moral and patriotic reasons. Other commentators, however, have speculated that Felt may have had more personal reasons for leaking information to Woodward.

In his book The Secret Man, Woodward describes Felt as a loyalist to and admirer of J. Edgar Hoover. After Hoover's death, Felt became angry and disgusted when L. Patrick Gray, a career naval officer and lawyer from the Civil Division of the Department of Justice, who had no law enforcement experience, was appointed as Director of the FBI over Felt, a 30-year veteran of the FBI. Felt was particularly unhappy with Gray's management style at the FBI, which was markedly different from Hoover's. Felt aided Woodward and Bernstein because he knew Woodward personally, having met him years before when Woodward was in the navy. Over the course of their acquaintance, Woodward would often call Felt for advice. Instead of seeking out prosecutors at the Justice Department, or the House Judiciary Committee charged with investigating presidential wrongdoing, Felt was methodically solicited by Woodward to guide their investigation while keeping his own identity and involvement safely concealed.

Some conservatives who worked for Nixon, such as Pat Buchanan and G. Gordon Liddy, castigated Felt and asserted their belief that Nixon was unfairly hounded from office, often claiming it a "witch hunt".

== Speculation concerning Mark Felt ==
=== Speculation within the White House ===
Although Deep Throat's identity was unconfirmed for over 30 years, there were suspicions that Felt was indeed the reporters' mysterious source long before the public acknowledgment in 2005. In 2012's Leak: Why Mark Felt Became Deep Throat, Max Holland reports that Felt leaked information to The Washington Post and Time. Time correspondent Sandy Smith told Time's lawyer, Roswell Gilpatric, a partner of Cravath, Swaine & Moore. Gilpatric then passed the information to Henry E. Petersen, the Assistant Attorney General in the Criminal Division of the Department of Justice. In turn, Petersen revealed the information to White House Counsel John W. Dean, who finally reported it to President Richard Nixon. Nixon also learned of Felt's role at the Post through a separate, parallel channel: a lawyer with inside knowledge of the Post's operations informed Petersen independently of the Time/Sandy Smith chain, though this source's identity has never been established.

Nixon did not publicly acknowledge learning Deep Throat's identity. Nixon claimed that if he had done so, Felt would have revealed information that would damage the FBI, as well as other powerful people and institutions. In the "smoking gun" tape, Nixon's chief of staff, H. R. Haldeman, stated that Felt "knows everything there is to know in the FBI." Haldeman implied that Nixon's motives for not outing Felt were not entirely altruistic, especially because Nixon himself may have been damaged by Felt's revelations.

=== Speculation in the press and the public ===
It had previously been revealed publicly that Deep Throat was definitely a man. Using this and other widespread clues, real or perceived, some members of the press and the public came to suspect Felt of being Deep Throat. For instance, George V. Higgins wrote in 1975: "Mark Felt knows more reporters than most reporters do, and there are some who think he had a Washington Post alias borrowed from a dirty movie." However, Woodward and Bernstein were tight-lipped concerning their informant's identity. Before Felt was revealed to be Deep Throat, only Woodward, Bernstein, Elsa Walsh and Ben Bradlee knew of his identity; after the death of Robert Redford, Woodward claimed that he had let Redford in on the secret during development of the film adaptation of All the President's Men. Writer Nora Ephron became obsessed with figuring out the secret of Deep Throat's identity and eventually correctly concluded that he was Mark Felt.

In 1999, a 19-year-old college student, Chase Culeman-Beckman, claimed that Bernstein's son, Jacob, told him Mark Felt was Deep Throat. According to Culeman-Beckman, Jacob Bernstein had said that he was, "100 percent sure that Deep Throat was Mark Felt. He's someone in the FBI." Jacob reportedly made this claim approximately 11 years prior, when he and Culeman-Beckman were classmates. Ephron explained that Jacob overheard her "speculations"; Carl Bernstein himself also immediately stepped forward to reject the claim, as he and Woodward did for many others. James Mann, who had worked at the Post at the time of Watergate scandal and was close to the investigation, brought a great deal of evidence together in a 1992 article in The Atlantic Monthly. Mann recalled that before the Watergate scandal, Woodward had made references to a high-placed source he had in the FBI. Mann argued that the information that Deep Throat gave Woodward could only have come from FBI files. Felt was also embittered at having been passed over for director of the FBI and believed that the FBI, in general, was hostile to the Nixon administration. In previous unrelated articles, Woodward made clear he had a highly placed source at the FBI, and there is some evidence he was friends with Felt.

Woodward kept in close touch with Felt over the years, even showing up unexpectedly at the house where he was staying with his daughter, Joan, in Santa Rosa, California in 1999 after Felt's dementia began. Some suspected at that time that Woodward might have asked Felt to reveal his identity, though Felt, when asked directly by others, had consistently denied being Deep Throat. In 2002, Timothy Noah called Felt "the best guess going about the identity of Deep Throat". In 1976, Assistant Attorney General John Stanley Pottinger had convened a grand jury to investigate a series of potentially illegal break-ins Felt authorized against various dissident groups. Felt was testifying before the jury when a juror asked him, out of the blue, "Were you Deep Throat?" Pottinger reports that Felt, "went white with fear". Pottinger explained to Felt that he was under oath and would have to answer truthfully. However, since Pottinger felt the question was outside the purview of the investigation, he offered to withdraw it if Felt wished.

According to author Ronald Kessler's book The Bureau: The Secret History of the FBI, Felt's daughter Joan, who was caring for her father, told Kessler in an interview for his book in August 2001 that back in the summer of 1999, Woodward showed up unexpectedly at their Santa Rosa home and took Felt to lunch. Joan told Kessler that she recalled her father greeting Woodward like an old friend. Their meeting appeared to be more of a celebration than an interview. "Woodward just showed up at the door and said he was in the area," Joan Felt was quoted as saying in Kessler's book, which was published in 2002. "He came in a white limousine, which parked at a schoolyard about ten blocks away. He walked to the house. He asked if it was okay to have a martini with my father at lunch, and I said it would be fine."

External videos
- Presentation by Kessler on The Bureau: The Secret History of the FBI, June 5, 2002, C-SPAN

Kessler said in his book that while Felt denied to him that he was Deep Throat, the measures Woodward took to conceal his meeting with Felt lent "credence" to the notion that Felt was Deep Throat. Woodward confirmed that Felt was Deep Throat in 2005. "There are plenty of people claiming they knew Deep Throat was actually former FBI man Mark Felt ..." the New York Post reported. "On May 3, 2002, PAGE SIX reported that Ronald Kessler, author of The Bureau: The Secret History of the FBI, says that all the evidence points to former top FBI official W. Mark Felt."

In February 2005, Nixon's former White House Counsel, news columnist John Dean, reported that Woodward had recently informed Bradlee that "Deep Throat" was ailing and Bradlee had written Deep Throat's obituary. Both Woodward and the then-current editor of The Washington Post, Leonard Downie, denied these claims. Felt was a suspect for Deep Throat, especially after the mysterious meeting that occurred between Woodward and Felt in the summer of 1999. But others had received more attention over the years, such as Pat Buchanan, Henry Kissinger, then-Associate Justice William Rehnquist, General Alexander Haig, and, before "Deep Throat" was confirmed a man, Diane Sawyer.

=== Felt's confirmation of his identity ===
On May 31, 2005, Vanity Fair reported that Felt, then aged 91, claimed to be the man once known as "Deep Throat". Later that day, Woodward, Bernstein, and Bradlee released a statement through The Washington Post confirming that the story was true. On June 2, 2005, The Washington Post ran a lengthy front-page column by Woodward in which he detailed his friendship with Felt in the years before Watergate. Woodward wrote that he first met Felt by chance in 1970 when Woodward was a Navy lieutenant in his mid-20s. Woodward was dispatched to deliver a package to the White House's West Wing. Felt arrived soon after for a separate appointment and sat next to Woodward in the waiting room. Woodward struck up a conversation and eventually learned of Felt's position in the upper echelon of the FBI. Woodward, who was about to exit the Navy at the time and was unsure about his future direction in life, became determined to use Felt as a mentor and career advisor. Therefore, he asked for Felt's phone number and kept in touch with him.

After deciding to try a career as a reporter, Woodward eventually joined The Washington Post in August 1971. Felt, who had long had a dim view of the Nixon administration, began passing pieces of information to Woodward, although he insisted that Woodward keep the FBI and Justice Department out of anything he wrote based on the information. The first time Woodward used information from Felt in a Washington Post story was in mid-May 1972, a month before the Watergate burglary, when Woodward was reporting on Arthur Bremer, who had attempted to assassinate presidential candidate George C. Wallace. Nixon had put Felt in charge of investigating the would-be assassin. A month later, just days after the Watergate break-in, Woodward called Felt at his office, which marked the first time Woodward spoke with Felt about Watergate.

Commenting on Felt's motivations for serving as Deep Throat, Woodward wrote, "Felt believed he was protecting the bureau by finding a way, clandestine as it was, to push some of the information from the FBI interviews and files out to the public, to help build public and political pressure to make Nixon and his people answerable. He had nothing but contempt for the Nixon White House and their efforts to manipulate the Bureau for political reasons."

== Composite character theory ==
Prior to Felt's revelation and Woodward's confirmation, part of the reason historians and other scholars had so much difficulty in identifying the real Deep Throat is that no single person seemed to truly fit the character described in All the President's Men. This had caused some scholars and commentators to come to the conclusion that Deep Throat could not possibly be a single person, and must be a composite of several sources. Woodward and Bernstein consistently denied the theory.

From a literary business perspective, this theory was further supported by David Obst, the agent who originally marketed the draft for All the President's Men, who stated that the initial typescript of the book contained no reference to Deep Throat. Obst believed that Deep Throat was invented by Woodward and Bernstein for dramatic purposes. It also led to speculation that the authors condensed history.

Ed Gray, the son of L. Patrick Gray III, stated in In Nixon's Web: A Year in the Crosshairs of Watergate that his examination of Woodward's interview notes pertaining to Deep Throat at the Harry Ransom Center at the University of Texas at Austin provided "convincing evidence that 'Deep Throat' was indeed a fabrication". According to Gray, the file contained notes regarding four interviews that were attributed to either Felt, "X", or "my friend", and a fifth interview dated March 24, 1973, that was unattributed. He said he discovered that he had already seen the paper in 2006 after Woodward released interview files with people who were not Deep Throat. Gray wrote that he contacted Stephen Mielke, the archivist who oversees the Woodward-Bernstein collection at the University of Texas, who said that a carbon copy of the paper contained a note in Woodward's handwriting attributing the interview to Donald Santarelli, an official with the Department of Justice during the Watergate era. Gray wrote that he contacted Santarelli who confirmed that the March 24 meeting was with him. Other interview notes attributed to "X" were interpreted by Gray as containing content that could not have been known by Felt.

Regarding Gray's allegations, Woodward wrote that the March 24 notes were obviously not from an interview with Felt because Felt is referred to by name twice in quotes from the source and that he never stated or wrote that he met with Deep Throat on that date. According to Woodward, Mielke said the page was likely misfiled under Felt due to a lack of source.

== Other suspected candidates ==
=== Fred Fielding ===
Another leading candidate was White House Associate Counsel Fred F. Fielding. In April 2003 Fielding was presented as a potential candidate as a result of a detailed review of source material by William Gaines and his journalism students, as part of a class at the University of Illinois journalism school. Fielding was the assistant to John Dean and as such had access to the files relating to the affair. Gaines believed that statements by Woodward ruled out Deep Throat's being in the FBI and that Deep Throat often had information before the FBI did. H. R. Haldeman himself suspected Fielding as being Deep Throat.

Dean had been one of the most dedicated hunters of Deep Throat. Both he and Leonard Garment dismissed Fielding as a possibility, reporting that he had been cleared by Woodward in 1980 when Fielding was applying for an important position in the Reagan administration. However, this assertion, which comes from Fielding, has not been corroborated.

One reason that many experts believed that Deep Throat was Fielding and not Felt was due to Woodward's apparent denial in an interview that Deep Throat worked in the intelligence community:

LUKAS: Do you resent the implication by some critics that your sources on Watergate – among them the fabled Deep Throat – may have been people in the intelligence community?

WOODWARD: I resent it because it's untrue.

=== Other credible candidates ===
Any candidate who died before the Felt admission ceased to fit Woodward's criteria at that time since Woodward had stated that he was free to reveal Deep Throat's identity once the person had died.

- John Ehrlichman: Nixon advisor. Died in 1999.
- Ron Ziegler: press secretary. Died in 2003.
- William E. Colby: head of the CIA. Died in 1996.
- Charles W. Bates: FBI executive whom Mann mentioned but considered less likely than Felt.
- William C. Sullivan: former head of the FBI intelligence operations, fired by J. Edgar Hoover in 1971. Died in 1977.
- L. Patrick Gray: acting FBI director who lived only four blocks away from Woodward, accused by a CBS documentary. Died in 2005.
- Robert Kunkel: FBI Washington Bureau Chief whom Mann considered less likely than Felt, as he moved to St. Louis partway through the investigation.
- Cord Meyer: CIA agent suggested in Mark Riebling's Wedge: The Secret War Between the FBI and CIA. However, Woodward stated that Deep Throat was not part of the intelligence community. Died in 2001.
- Raymond Price: Nixon speechwriter. Died in 2019.
- Secret Service technicians: Richard Cohen argued it was whoever in the Secret Service maintained Nixon's secret taping devices.
- Richard Ober, the chief of the CIA's domestic spying program called Operation CHAOS.

=== Less credible candidates ===
- William Rehnquist: He had a position in the Department of Justice early in the Nixon administration, working for Attorney General John N. Mitchell. More than five months before the Watergate break-in, he was appointed as the Associate Justice of the Supreme Court and it would have been almost impossible for him to have had access to much of the information attributed to Deep Throat. In February 2005, Dean reported that Deep Throat was ailing, and Rehnquist, now the Chief Justice, was known to be suffering from thyroid cancer, which caused his death later that year. The report caused a resurgence of speculation that Rehnquist was Deep Throat. However, Woodward later stated that the notion that Deep Throat was ailing had been a misunderstanding.
- Henry Kissinger: Nixon's National Security Advisor and Secretary of State, was out of the country on some of the dates Woodward reported to have met with Deep Throat.
- George H. W. Bush: In 1972, Bush was the United States Ambassador to the United Nations. He was speculated in February 2005 by Adrian Havill – author of a 1993 biography of Woodward and Bernstein, Deep Truth (ISBN 1-55972-172-3) – following the unveiling of Woodward's notes at the University of Texas. Havill had argued in his biography that Deep Throat was a composite figure, but stated in a letter to Poynter Online that based on more recent events and research, he now believed Deep Throat was George H. W. Bush.
- General Alexander Haig: Authors Len Colodny and Robert Gettlin speculated in their 1991 book Silent Coup: The Removal of a President that Haig may have been Deep Throat. Haig died in 2010.
- Diane Sawyer: She was hired by White House press secretary Ron Ziegler to serve in the Nixon administration. On his deathbed, Nixon supporter Baruch Korff wrongly claimed that Sawyer was Deep Throat.
- Ben Stein: A Nixon speechwriter and the son of Nixon economic advisor Herbert Stein; later an actor, political commentator, and game show host.
- Gerald Ford: Suggestion that Ford may have been Deep Throat as he was next in line for the presidency, although in 1972 he was still the House Minority Leader and yet to become vice president.
- Pat Buchanan: Served as special assistant to the president, was nominated as a potential candidate by Dean in his 2002 book Unmasking Deep Throat and initially suspected by the University of Illinois journalism class which eventually blamed Fielding. Buchanan, who repeatedly denied the theory, personally believed that Deep Throat was Connecticut Senator Lowell Weicker, an anti-Nixon Republican who served on the Senate Watergate Committee.
- Richard Nixon himself: There was some suggestion that Nixon had used back-channels to communicate with Woodward in a bizarre attempt to showcase his persecution by the media, which backfired. This theory was largely discredited.
- J. Fred Buzhardt: White House counsel to President Nixon.
- G. Gordon Liddy: Member of the White House Plumbers. Largely dismissed.

== In popular culture ==
- Hal Holbrook portrayed Deep Throat in the film adaptation of All the President's Men (1976), in which he uttered the catchphrase, "Follow the money" (which was not referred to in the book).
- In the comedy film Dick (1999), Deep Throat is revealed as being two teenage Washingtonian girls who worked as Nixon's dog walkers.
- In the spy thriller film Mark Felt: The Man Who Brought Down the White House (2017), Liam Neeson portrays Mark Felt.
- In The X-Files, Fox Mulder uses some of the same techniques as Woodward to communicate with a government informant nicknamed "Deep Throat". It is left unclear if this character is supposed to be the same as the Watergate informant.
- In NewsRadio S3E1, Stephen Root's character Jimmy James, who has been discovered to have held a lobbying role at the Nixon White House, proclaims that he is Deep Throat during his presidential campaign announcement (set in 1996).
- In Will & Grace S7E13, "Board Games," Karen says she leaked information to Woodward & Bernstein, implying she was Deep Throat.
- In American Horror Story S10E10, Mamie Eisenhower is revealed as Deep Throat and fabricates the Watergate story to discredit Nixon before he can tell the world about aliens.
