= Clyde Tolson =

American law enforcement officer (1900–1975)

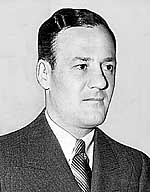

1st Associate Director of the Federal Bureau of Investigation
- In office 1930 – May 3, 1972
- President: Herbert Hoover; Franklin D. Roosevelt; Harry S. Truman; Dwight D. Eisenhower; John F. Kennedy; Lyndon B. Johnson; Richard Nixon
- Preceded by: Position established
- Succeeded by: Mark Felt

Director of the Federal Bureau of Investigation
- Acting
- In office May 2, 1972 – May 3, 1972
- President: Richard Nixon
- Preceded by: J. Edgar Hoover
- Succeeded by: L. Patrick Gray (acting)

Personal details
- Born: Clyde Anderson Tolson; May 22, 1900 Laredo, Missouri, U.S.
- Died: April 14, 1975 (aged 74) Washington, D.C., U.S.
- Resting place: Congressional Cemetery
- Party: Republican
- Education: George Washington University (BA, LLB)
- Awards: President's Award for Distinguished Federal Civilian Service (1965)

Clyde Anderson Tolson (May 22, 1900 – April 14, 1975) was an American law enforcement officer who was the second-ranking official of the FBI from 1930 until 1972, from 1947 titled Associate Director, primarily responsible for personnel and discipline. He was the protégé and long-time top deputy of FBI Director J. Edgar Hoover.

== Early life ==
Tolson was born in Laredo, Missouri to James William Tolson, a farmer and railroad freight guard, and Joaquin Miller Tolson (née Anderson). His brother, Hillory Alfred Tolson (1887–1983), was assistant director of the National Park Service, executive director of the White House Historical Association, and an FBI agent before entering the Park Service. Tolson graduated from Laredo High School in 1915 and attended Cedar Rapids Business College, from which he graduated in 1918.

== Early career ==
From 1919 to 1928, Tolson was confidential secretary for three Secretaries of War: Newton D. Baker, John W. Weeks, and Dwight F. Davis. He completed a Bachelor of Arts degree at George Washington University in 1925 and a Bachelor of Laws from the same institution in 1927. While attending George Washington, Tolson became a member of the Delta Pi chapter of Sigma Nu.

== Career ==
In 1928, Tolson applied to the FBI and was hired as a special agent later that year. Tolson reportedly indicated on his application that he wanted to use the job as a stepping stone to gain experience and earn enough money to open a law practice in Cedar Rapids. After working in the FBI's Boston and Washington, D.C., field offices, he became the chief FBI clerk and was promoted to assistant director in 1930.

In 1936, Tolson joined Hoover to arrest bank robber Alvin Karpis. Later that year, he survived a gunfight with gangster Harry Brunette. In 1942, Tolson participated in capturing Nazi saboteurs on Long Island and in Florida. In 1947, he was made FBI Associate Director with duties in budget and administration.

== Relationship with Hoover ==
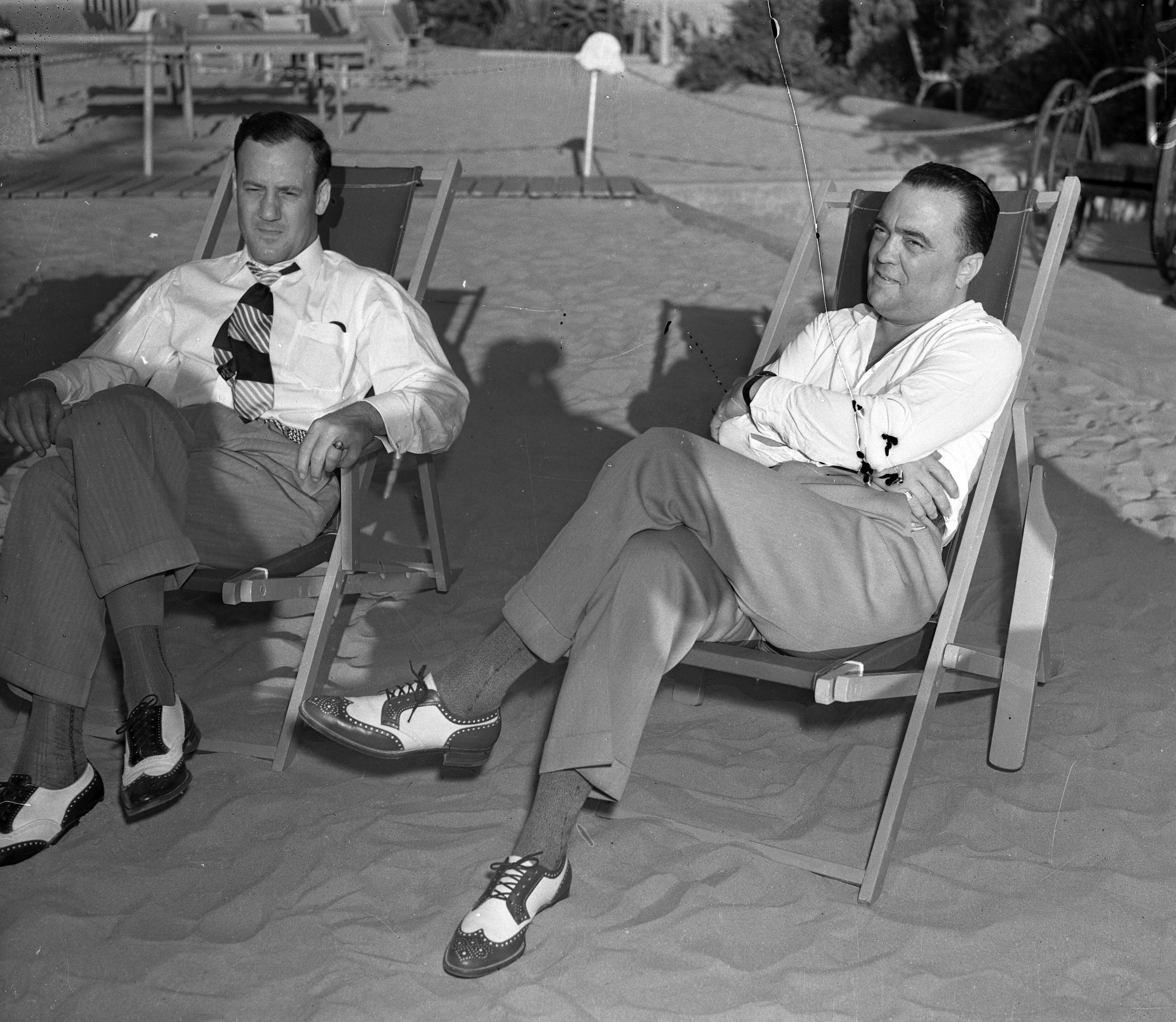
Tolson (left) with J. Edgar Hoover, c. 1939

It has been stated that J. Edgar Hoover described: "They rode to and from work together, ate lunch together, and often traveled together on official or unofficial business." Their relationship has been described as "what many considered a 'spousal' relationship between the two men". Some authors dismissed the rumors about Hoover's sexual orientation and possible intimate relationship with Tolson, while others have described them as probable or even confirmed, and still others reported the rumors without stating an opinion. The two men often spent weekends together in New York, Christmas season together in Florida, and the start of the Del Mar horse racing season together in California.

When Hoover died in 1972, Tolson inherited his estate of US$551,000 ($4.2 million today), moved into his house, and accepted the U.S. flag draped on Hoover's coffin.

== Later life and death ==
In 1965, President Lyndon B. Johnson awarded him the President's Award for Distinguished Federal Civilian Service, saying that Tolson "has been a vital force in raising the proficiency of law enforcement at all levels and in guiding the Federal Bureau of Investigation to new heights of accomplishment through periods of great National challenge." Hoover kept Tolson employed in the FBI even after Tolson became too old for police duty and passed the retirement age.

After Hoover's death on May 2, 1972, Tolson was briefly the acting head of the FBI. L. Patrick Gray became acting director on May 3. Citing ill health, Tolson retired from the bureau on May 4, the day of Hoover's funeral. Mark Felt was appointed to Tolson's position.

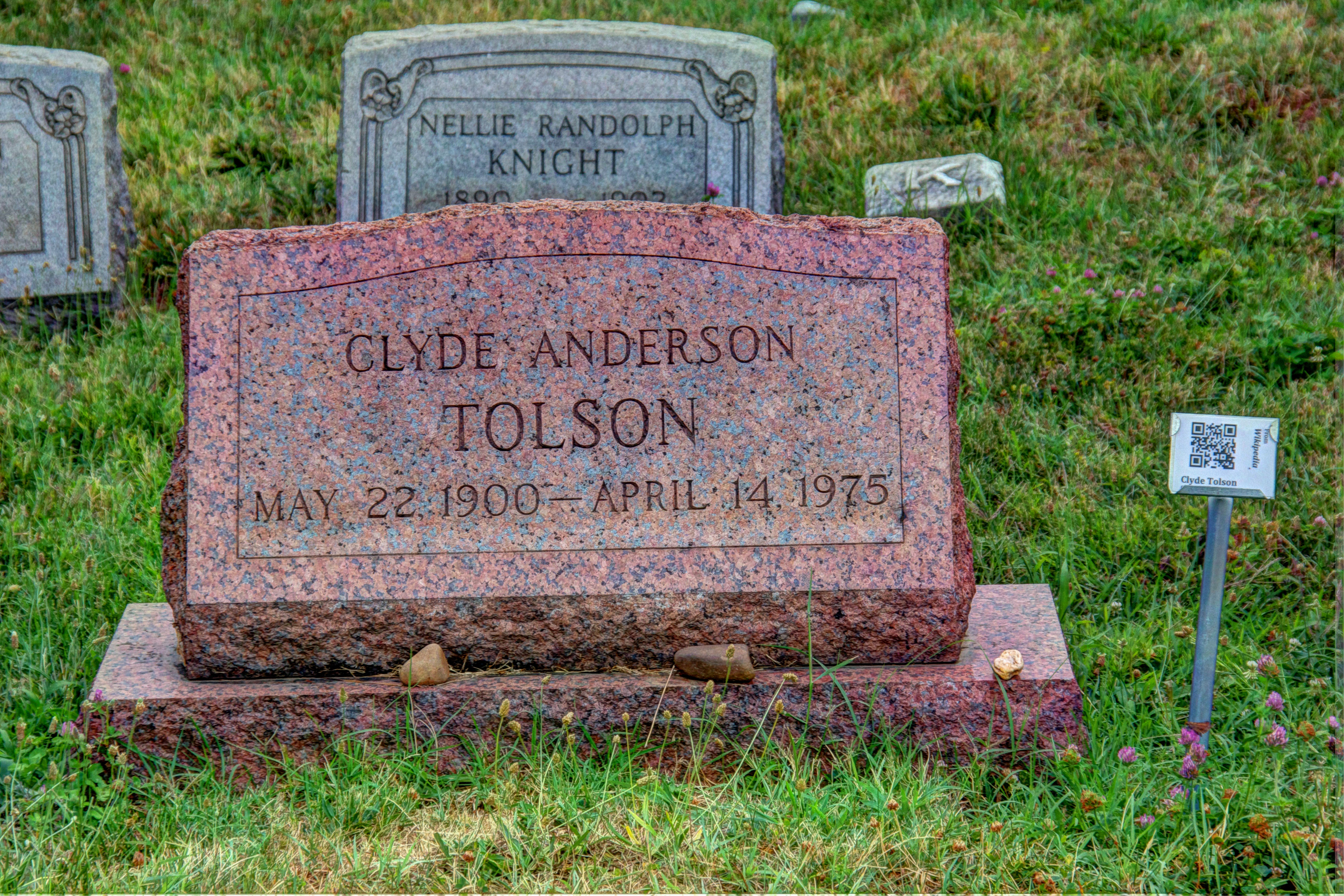
Tolson's headstone at the Congressional Cemetery

After Tolson left the FBI, his health began to decline further. In 1975, Tolson suffered a stroke and remained somewhat frail for the remainder of his life. On April 10, 1975, Tolson was admitted to Doctors Community Hospital in Washington, D.C., for kidney failure. He died there four days later of heart failure at the age of 74. Tolson is buried in the Congressional Cemetery in Washington D.C., near Hoover's grave.

== Depictions in media ==
Tolson has been depicted numerous times in novels, television, and movies, including:

- The 1977 film The Private Files of J. Edgar Hoover portrayed by Dan Dailey
- The 1984 TV movie Concealed Enemies portrayed by Ralph Byers
- The 1987 TV movie J. Edgar Hoover portrayed by actor Robert Harper
- The 1992 TV movie Citizen Cohn portrayed by Daniel von Bargen
- The 1994 satirical radio play "J. Edgar," written by Harry Shearer, portrayed by John Goodman
- The 1995 film Nixon portrayed by Brian Bedford
- The 1997 novel Underworld by Don DeLillo
- The 1999 episode "Matryoshka" of Millennium by Peter Hanlon
- The 2009 film Public Enemies portrayed by Chandler Williams
- The 2011 film J. Edgar portrayed by Armie Hammer
- The 2013 TV movie The Curse of Edgar portrayed by actor Anthony Higgins
- The 2015 comic Providence by Alan Moore
