= Yardley, Pennsylvania =

Borough in Pennsylvania, US

- Borough
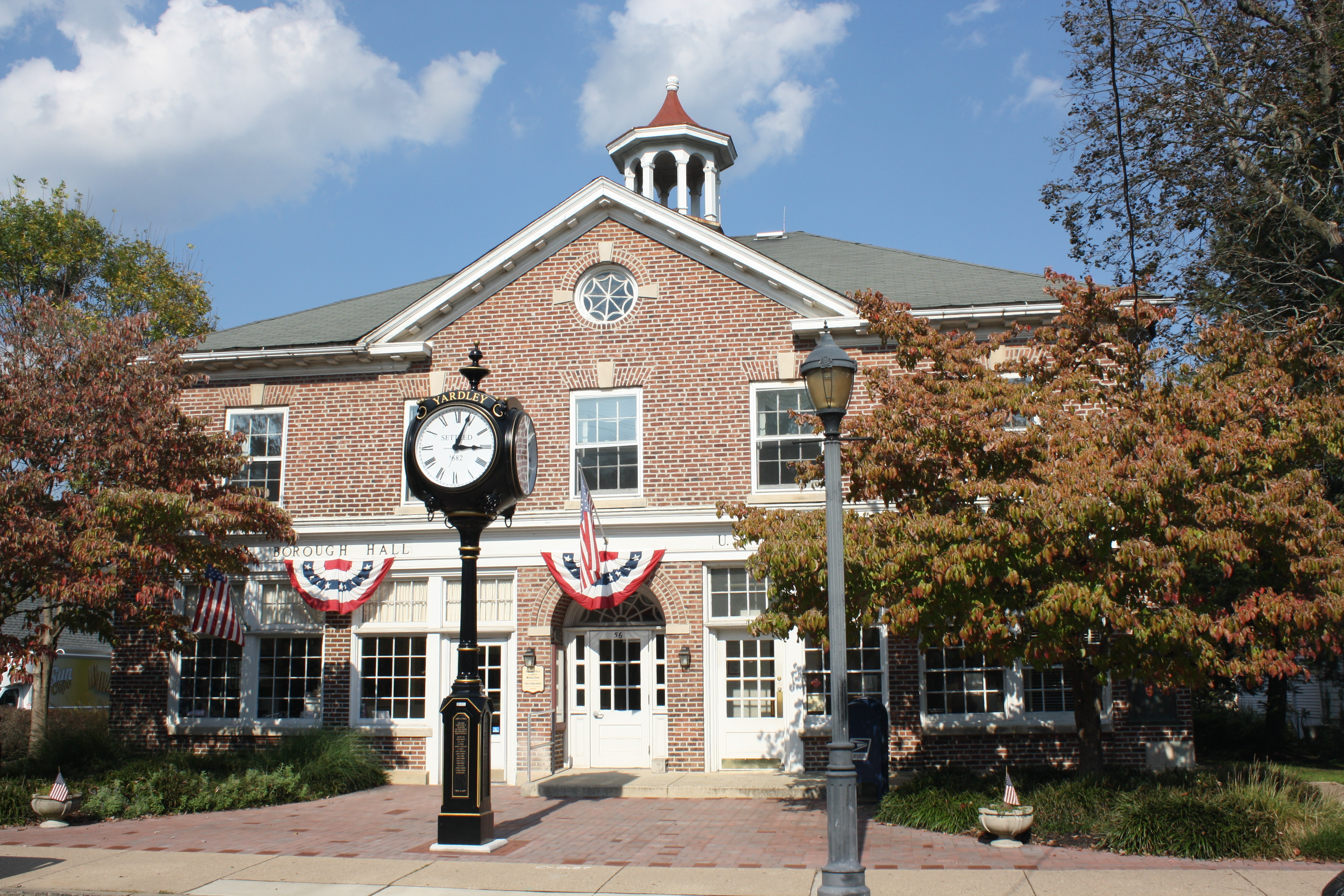
- Yardley Borough Hall

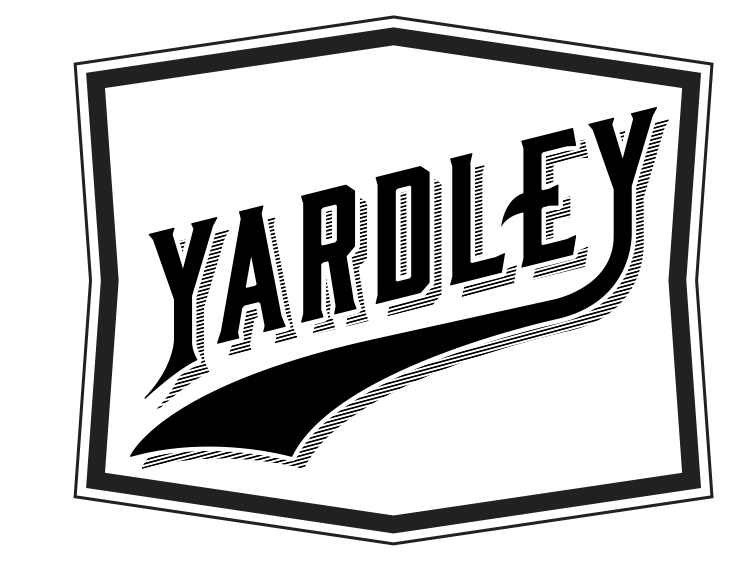
- Seal

- Location of Yardley in Bucks County, Pennsylvania (left) and of Bucks County in Pennsylvania (right)

- Location of Yardley in Pennsylvania Yardley (the United States)
- Coordinates: 40°14′29″N 74°50′11″W
- Country: United States
- State: Pennsylvania
- County: Bucks
- Founded: 1682
- Incorporated: March 4, 1895

Government
  - Mayor: Caroline Thompson

Area
  - Total: 1.02 sq mi (2.64 km^{2})
  - Land: 0.93 sq mi (2.42 km^{2})
  - Water: 0.085 sq mi (0.22 km^{2}) 8.8%
- Elevation: 46 ft (14 m)

Population (2010)
  - Total: 2,480
  - Estimate (2019): 2,514
  - Density: 2,691.9/sq mi (1,039.33/km^{2})
- Time zone: UTC−5 (EST)
  - Summer (DST): UTC−4 (EDT)
- ZIP Code: 19067
- Area codes: 215, 267 and 445
- FIPS code: 42-86920
- Website: https://www.yardleyboro.org/

Yardley is a borough in Bucks County, Pennsylvania, United States. Yardley borders the Delaware River and Ewing Township, New Jersey to its east and Lower Makefield Township to its north, west, and south. The United States Post Office assigns many addresses in Lower Makefield Township the preferred city of "Yardley", although they are outside the borough. As of the 2020 census, Yardley had a population of 2,605. Yardley is part of the Philadelphia metropolitan area.

== History ==
Yardley was founded by William Yardley, who emigrated to America in July 1682 with his family. He made an agreement with William Penn, before leaving England, to buy 500 acres (2.0 km^{2}) for ten pounds. A survey was completed in October 1682, and the area William Yardley settled was called "Prospect Farm." It was located just outside the present Yardley Borough. William Yardley died in 1693, and his family in 1702–1703, possibly of smallpox. The family's burial plots are located in Slate Hill Cemetery, one of the oldest Quaker burial grounds in the state.

A nephew, Thomas Yardley, came to America in 1704 to settle the estate and never returned to England. He opened a ferry line which started operating in 1710 from Letchworth Avenue, the lower boundary of the village, and landed in New Jersey further downstream. This was an important link between West Jersey and the three roads leading to Philadelphia by way of Falls, Langhorne and Newtown. The Yardley family occupied the land for more than 150 years. When Yardley was founded there were already small settlements at nearby Burlington, Bristol, and Falls Ferry.

Yardley began to develop into a village about 1807, and by 1880 had a population of 820. Early industries included a spoke and handle factory, sawmill, felloe factory, plate and plaster mill, and two flour mills. The first post office, established in 1828, used the name "Yardleyville". The name became "Yardley" again at the time the Reading Railroad came through the area in 1876.

During the American Civil War, Yardley was a station for the Underground Railroad, an escape route for slaves. Known hiding places were under the eaves of the Continental Hotel (now the Continental Tavern), in bins of warehouses on the Delaware Canal (completed in 1862), and at the General Store (now Worthington Insurance). At Lakeside, the yellow house facing Lake Afton on N. Main Street, one brick-walled cellar room is also thought to have been a hiding place.

The borough of Yardley was incorporated on March 4, 1895.

The Train Collectors Association was founded in Yardley in 1954.

== Geography ==
According to the U.S. Census Bureau, the borough has a total area of 1.0 square mile (2.6 km^{2}), of which 0.9 square miles (2.3 km^{2}) is land and 0.1 square miles (0.26 km^{2}) (9.90%) is water.

The Delaware Canal and its towpath bisect the borough from northwest to southeast. Access points to the canal are located at Edgewater Avenue, Afton Avenue, Fuld Avenue, College Avenue and South Canal Street.\

=== Climate ===
According to the Köppen climate classification system, Yardley has a Humid subtropical climate (Cfa). Cfa climates are characterized by all months having an average mean temperature > 32.0 °F (0.0 °C), at least four months with an average mean temperature ≥ 50.0 °F (10.0 °C), at least one month with an average mean temperature ≥ 71.6 °F (22.0 °C) and no significant precipitation difference between seasons. Although most summer days are slightly humid in Yardley, episodes of heat and high humidity can occur with heat index values > 108 °F (42 °C). Since 1981, the highest air temperature was 103.9 °F (39.9 °C) on July 20, 2011, and the highest daily average mean dew point was 75.0 °F (23.9 °C) on July 20, 1981. The average wettest month is July, which corresponds with the annual peak in thunderstorm activity. Since 1981, the wettest calendar day was 5.85 inches (149 mm) on September 16, 1999. During the winter months, the average annual extreme minimum air temperature is 1.0 °F (−17.2 °C). Since 1981, the coldest air temperature was −10.4 °F (−23.6 °C) on January 22, 1984. Episodes of extreme cold and wind can occur, with wind chill values < −9 °F (−23 °C). The average annual snowfall (Nov–Apr) is between 24 inches (61 cm) and 30 inches (76 cm). Ice storms and large snowstorms depositing ≥ 12 inches (30 cm) of snow occur once every few years, particularly during nor’easters from December through February.

Climate data for Yardley, Elevation 43 ft (13 m), 1991–2020 normals, extremes 1981–2018
Month	Jan	Feb	Mar	Apr	May	Jun	Jul	Aug	Sep	Oct	Nov	Dec	Year
Record high °F (°C)	71.7 (22.1)	77.7 (25.4)	87.7 (30.9)	94.3 (34.6)	95.4 (35.2)	96.7 (35.9)	103.9 (39.9)	99.8 (37.7)	98.4 (36.9)	89.6 (32.0)	81.1 (27.3)	75.9 (24.4)	103.9 (39.9)
Mean daily maximum °F (°C)	40.7 (4.8)	43.5 (6.4)	51.7 (10.9)	63.9 (17.7)	73.3 (22.9)	82.6 (28.1)	86.9 (30.5)	85.1 (29.5)	78.2 (25.7)	66.9 (19.4)	55.9 (13.3)	44.8 (7.1)	64.5 (18.1)
Daily mean °F (°C)	32.4 (0.2)	34.6 (1.4)	41.9 (5.5)	52.7 (11.5)	62.0 (16.7)	71.6 (22.0)	76.2 (24.6)	74.6 (23.7)	67.4 (19.7)	55.8 (13.2)	46.2 (7.9)	36.5 (2.5)	54.4 (12.4)
Mean daily minimum °F (°C)	24.1 (−4.4)	25.7 (−3.5)	32.1 (0.1)	41.5 (5.3)	50.7 (10.4)	60.5 (15.8)	65.6 (18.7)	64.0 (17.8)	56.6 (13.7)	44.8 (7.1)	36.6 (2.6)	28.3 (−2.1)	44.3 (6.8)
Record low °F (°C)	−10.4 (−23.6)	−2.4 (−19.1)	4.1 (−15.5)	18.1 (−7.7)	33.6 (0.9)	41.6 (5.3)	47.8 (8.8)	42.5 (5.8)	35.9 (2.2)	25.2 (−3.8)	12.2 (−11.0)	0.3 (−17.6)	−10.4 (−23.6)
Average precipitation inches (mm)	3.55 (90)	2.81 (71)	4.27 (108)	3.99 (101)	4.20 (107)	4.39 (112)	5.29 (134)	4.24 (108)	4.43 (113)	3.75 (95)	3.60 (91)	4.09 (104)	48.61 (1,235)
Average relative humidity (%)	65.4	61.4	57.5	56.6	61.7	65.7	66.0	68.1	69.3	68.3	66.6	66.2	64.4
Average dew point °F (°C)	21.6 (−5.8)	22.7 (−5.2)	28.0 (−2.2)	37.7 (3.2)	48.7 (9.3)	59.5 (15.3)	64.0 (17.8)	63.4 (17.4)	57.0 (13.9)	45.5 (7.5)	35.7 (2.1)	26.3 (−3.2)	42.6 (5.9)
Source: PRISM

== Demographics ==
Historical population
Census	Pop.	Note	%±
1880	820		—
1890	813		−0.9%
1900	714		−12.2%
1910	894		25.2%
1920	1,262		41.2%
1930	1,308		3.6%
1940	1,459		11.5%
1950	1,916		31.3%
1960	2,271		18.5%
1970	2,616		15.2%
1980	2,533		−3.2%
1990	2,288		−9.7%
2000	2,498		9.2%
2010	2,434		−2.6%
2020	2,605		7.0%

As of the 2010 census, the borough was 89.7% Non-Hispanic White, 3.5% Black or African American, 2.6% Asian, and 1.9% were two or more races. 2.5% of the population were of Hispanic or Latino ancestry.

As of the census of 2000, there were 2,498 people, 1,170 households, and 649 families residing in the borough. The population density was 2,729.0 inhabitants per square mile (1,053.7/km^{2}). There were 1,209 housing units at an average density of 1,320.8 per square mile (510.0/km^{2}). The racial makeup of the borough was 93.63% White, 3.44% African American, 0.08% Native American, 1.20% Asian, 0.04% Pacific Islander, 0.52% from other races, and 1.08% from two or more races. 1.76% of the population were Hispanic or Latino of any race.

There were 1,170 households, out of which 24.4% had children under the age of 18 living with them, 43.9% were married couples living together, 8.6% had a female householder with no husband present, and 44.5% were non-families. 37.0% of all households were made up of individuals, and 10.8% had someone living alone who was 65 years of age or older. The average household size was 2.14 and the average family size was 2.86.

In the borough, the population was spread out, with 20.4% under the age of 18, 4.8% from 18 to 24, 35.3% from 25 to 44, 24.9% from 45 to 64, and 14.7% who were 65 years of age or older. The median age was 40 years. For every 100 females, there were 90.7 males. For every 100 females age 18 and over, there were 86.3 males.

The median income for a household in the borough was $58,221, and the median income for a family was $70,938. Males had a median income of $50,816 versus $41,893 for females. The per capita income for the township was $32,802. About 1.7% of families and 3.1% of the population were below the poverty line, including 2.6% of those under age 18 and 3.3% of those age 65 or over.

== Arts and culture ==
The former Bridge in Yardley Borough, Washington Crossing State Park, and Yardley Historic District are listed on the National Register of Historic Places.

== Government ==
United States presidential election results for Yardley Borough
Year	Republican		Democratic		Third party(ies)	
Year	No.	%	No.	%	No.	%
2024	707	35.92%	1239	62.96%	22	1.12%
2020	660	34.59%	1214	63.63%	34	1.78%
2016	626	38.88%	907	56.34%	77	4.78%
2012	595	40.01%	858	57.70%	34	2.29%
2008	594	38.45%	938	60.71%	13	0.84%

Elected officials in Yardley Borough serve four-year terms and comprise a seven-member borough council, mayor, and tax collector. The borough council acts as the primary legislative and financial governing body, responsible for enacting ordinances, approving annual budgets and expenditures, levying taxes, overseeing land development, and appointing municipal staff and board members. The mayor's main duty is to direct the local police department and preserve public order, though they also hold the authority to declare local emergencies and cast tie-breaking votes during council deadlocks. The tax collector manages the administration of the borough's revenue by collecting municipal, county, and school property taxes, overseeing the Business Privilege Tax program, maintaining accurate tax records, and assisting the public with tax-related inquiries.

== Infrastructure ==
=== Transportation ===
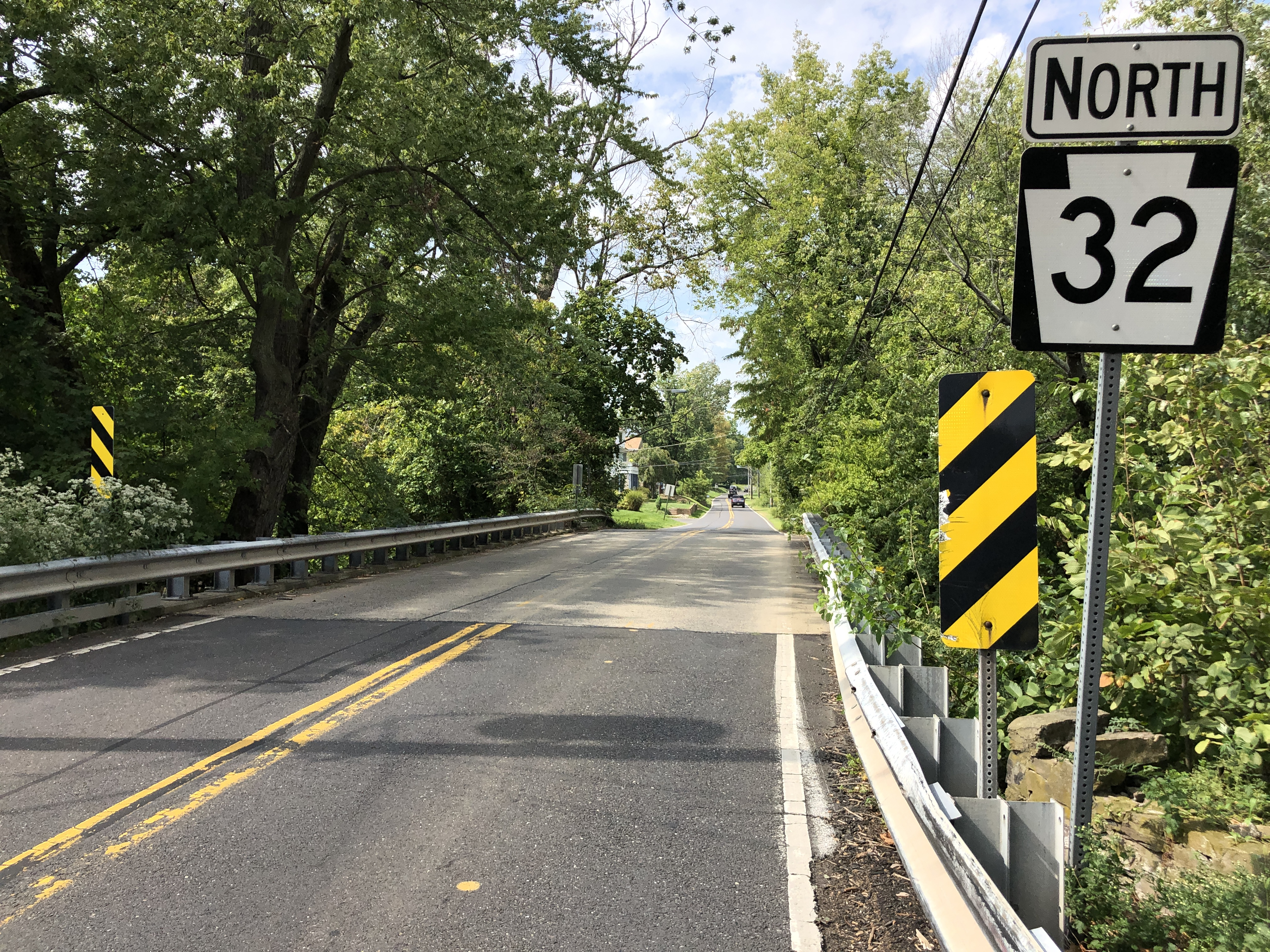
PA 32 northbound in Yardley

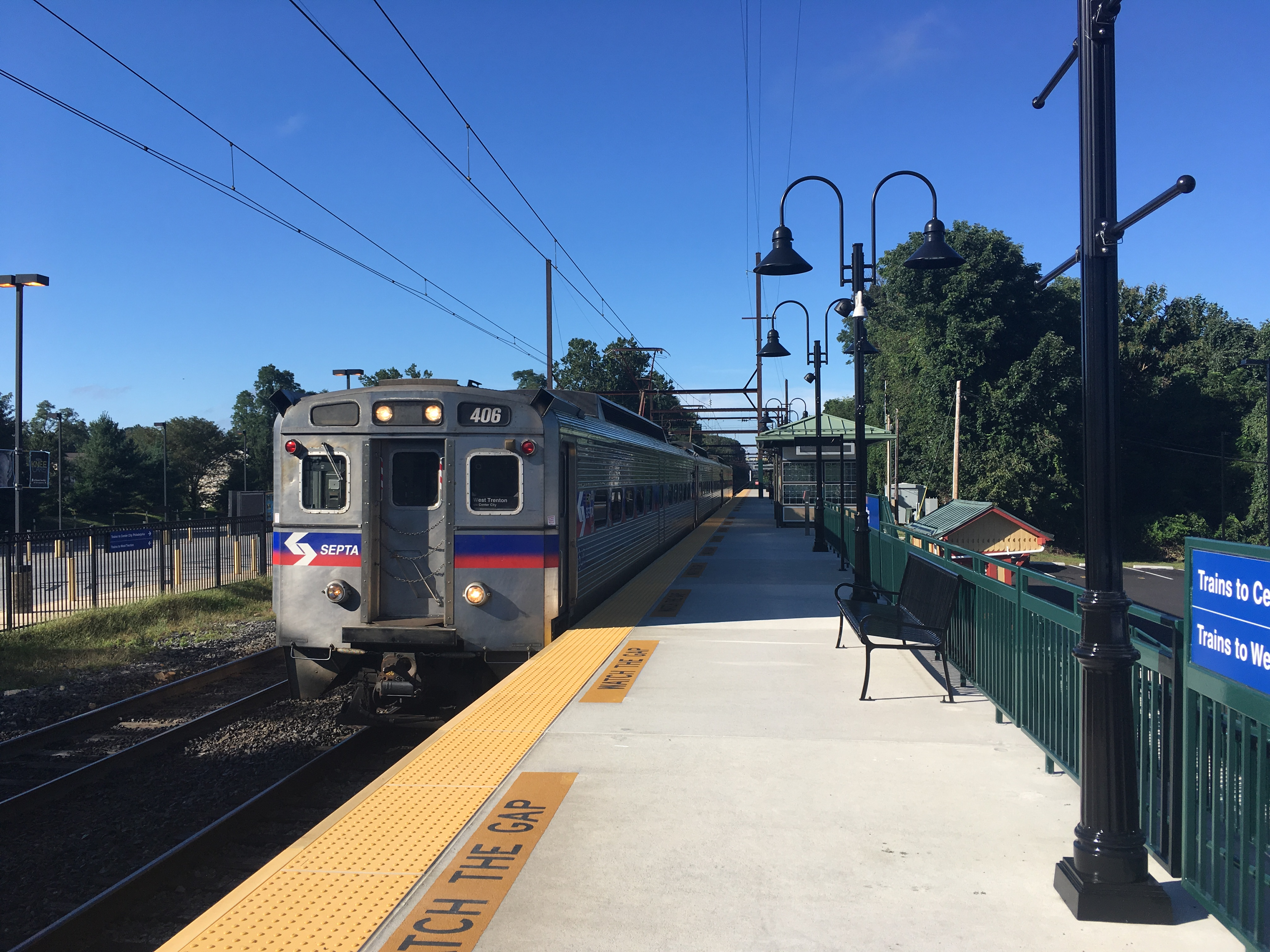
A SEPTA Regional Rail train on the West Trenton Line at the Yardley station

As of 2014, there were 10.64 miles (17.12 km) of public roads in Yardley, of which 3.74 miles (6.02 km) were maintained by the Pennsylvania Department of Transportation (PennDOT) and 6.90 miles (11.10 km) were maintained by the borough.

Highways include:

- Pennsylvania Route 32
- Pennsylvania Route 332

The Philadelphia to Bound Brook, New Jersey, two-track main line of the Philadelphia and Reading Railroad passed through and stopped at Yardley; it crossed the Delaware River on a still standing massive stone viaduct called the West Trenton Railroad Bridge. This line now is SEPTA Regional Rail's West Trenton Line and operates also as a CSX freight line called the Trenton Subdivision.

SEPTA trains along the West Trenton Line stop at the Yardley station. Prior to the 1950s, the Baltimore and Ohio Railroad's New York City-bound trains from Washington, D.C., (Royal Blue, Capitol Limited, National Limited, Ambassador, and others) used the Reading's trackage to Bound Brook as did the Reading's Crusader.

== Notable people ==
- Susan Abulhawa, writer and political activist
- Algernon Cadwallader, emo band
- Bill Barretta, puppeteer (the Muppets)
- Robert Costa, reporter (The Washington Post) and writer (Peril)
- David Curtiss, professional swimmer (2020 US Olympic Trials finalist)
- Hallie Jackson, NBC News correspondent
- Richard Kind, actor and comedian (Mad About You, Spin City, Curb Your Enthusiasm).
- Kristin Minter, actress (ER)
- Jimmy Ockford, professional soccer player (Colorado Springs Switchbacks FC)
- Brian O'Neill, professional hockey player (New Jersey Devils, 2018 Winter Olympics Team USA)
- Aileen Quinn, actress (Annie)
- Meghan Roche, fashion model
- Matthew Schuler, singer, The Voice contestant
- Bo Welch, production designer (Beetlejuice) and director (The Cat in the Hat)
- Zach Woods, Actor (The Office, Silicon Valley).
