= The War Within (Woodward book) =

2008 book by Bob Woodward

The War Within: A Secret White House History (2006–2008)
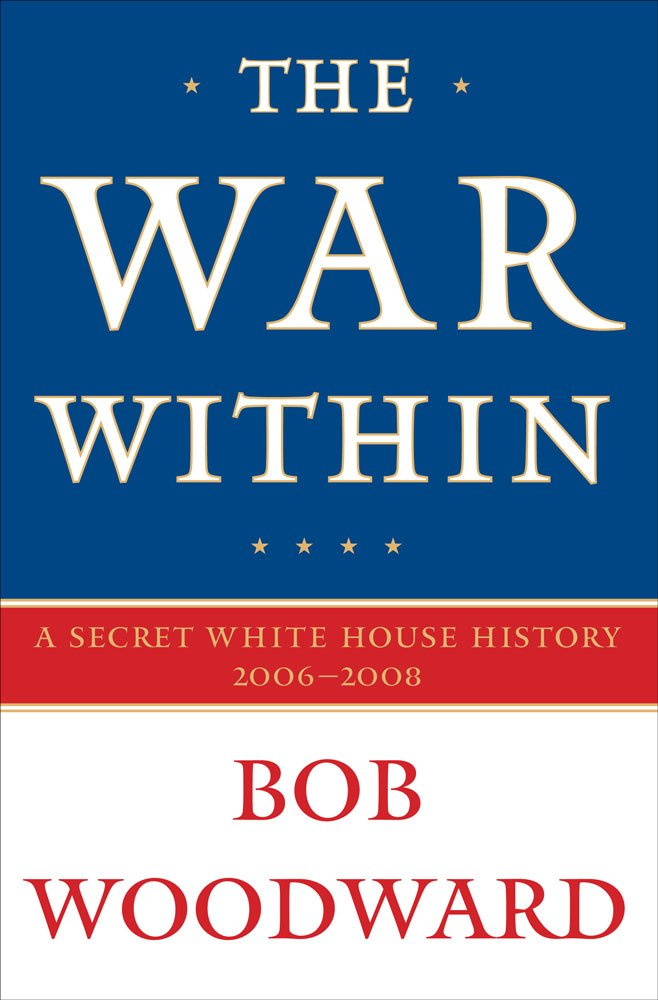
- First edition cover
- Author: Bob Woodward
- Language: English
- Subject: Political science, United States, Iraq, George W. Bush
- Publisher: Simon & Schuster
- Publication date: September 8, 2008
- Publication place: United States
- Media type: Print, ebook, audiobook
- Pages: 512
- ISBN: 1-4165-5897-7
- OCLC: 191245847
- LC Class: DS79.76 .W663 2008
- Preceded by: State of Denial: Bush at War, Part III
- Followed by: Obama's Wars

The War Within: A Secret White House History (2006–2008) is a non-fiction book by Washington Post reporter Bob Woodward that was released by publisher Simon & Schuster on September 8, 2008. It is the fifteenth book written by Woodward, the fourth in a series of books about President George W. Bush and his administration's foreign policy including Bush at War, Plan of Attack, and State of Denial. The book discusses the debate within the administration about the controversial Iraq "surge" strategy implemented in 2007. Simon & Schuster editor Alice Mayhew said in an official statement that "There has not been such an authoritative and intimate account of presidential decision making since the Nixon tapes and the Pentagon Papers. This is the declassification of what went on in secret, behind the scenes."

== Writing the book ==
The author spoke extensively with officials from every level of the federal government. He conducted 150 interviews, spending three hours with Bush in the Oval Office. Politico called the Bush administration's cooperation with Woodward "remarkable". Before its publication, Woodward posted key excerpts and points of synopsis on The Washington Post's website. Press Secretary Ari Fleischer has said, "The message got down to everybody: 'Talk to him'".

Bush had decided to speak to Woodward despite the fact that he had declined Woodward's requests for his previous book State of Denial. The New Republic has also stated that General David H. Petraeus provided off the record information for the writing.

== Statements in the book ==
=== Synopsis ===
The book states that President Bush "rarely leveled with the public to explain what he was doing and what should be expected... The president was rarely the voice of realism on the Iraq war." It also calls him "the nation's most divisive figure" and described his foreign policy as a failure, saying "He had not rooted out terror wherever it existed... He had not achieved world peace. He had not attained victory in his two wars." At the same time, the book largely supports the 'surge' strategy and lauds the President for adopting it.

The book describes Bush as largely leaving the management of the war to Generals George Casey and John Abizaid and deferring to their judgment based on Bush's perception of Lyndon Johnson's micromanagement during the Vietnam War. As the generals' strategy of drawing down U.S. forces and transferring control to the Iraqis begins to fail, the book argues, Bush grows more disillusioned and sought other ideas. The book alleges that, nevertheless, the President delayed serious investigation because of his fear that leaked reports would hurt the Republican Party's chances in the 2006 congressional elections. It states that Defense Secretary Donald Rumsfeld refused to consider resigning unless the Republicans lost control of either the House of Representatives or the Senate.

After the Democratic Party's takeover of Congress, Bush allegedly delegated the responsibility for finding a new strategy almost solely to National Security Adviser Stephen J. Hadley and deputy National Security Adviser Meghan L. O'Sullivan. Against the advice of the vast majority of his staff and other administration officials, Bush finally decided on the 'surge' strategy devised by retired General Jack Keane and General David H. Petraeus. The book describes deep infighting within the administration.

=== Allegations ===
==== Alleged comments by Senator John McCain ====
The book reports that Senator John McCain expressed frustration with the Bush administration's Iraq policy, at one point clenching his fists and screaming at Woodward that "Everything is fucking spin" coming out of the White House.

==== Alleged secret eavesdropping program ====
Woodward states that the US government has constantly eavesdropped on Iraqi Prime Minister Nouri al-Maliki. An anonymous source says in the book, "We know everything he says."

==== Alleged secret U.S. killing program in Iraq ====
Woodward asserts that the U.S. is implementing a secret killing program in Iraq targeting designated terrorists and that this program in large parts accounts for the significant drop in violence in the country. This program may have been being carried out by Task Force 77. The secrecy surrounding the program can, according to Woodward, in some ways be compared to the Manhattan Project during World War II in which the atomic bomb was developed amidst an unprecedented veil of secrecy. Following the publication of the book, U.S. National security adviser Stephen Hadley acknowledged the existence of the described strategy.

== Response ==
According to Nielsen BookScan, The War Within sold just 159,000 copies as of June 2009. This is far below Woodward's earlier work State of Denial, which sold more than half a million. The New Republic reported that Woodward was "lamenting" this drop.

=== Bush administration response ===
Initially, unofficial responses from members of the Bush administration's were very favorable as they saw the book as reflecting the success of the 'surge' strategy. However, National Security Adviser Stephen J. Hadley released an official statement on September 5 disputing some of Woodward's interpretations and opinions expressed in the book, though not with his record of the facts.

=== Critical response ===
Fox News has described the overall tone of the book towards Bush as "mixed". However, International Herald Tribune reviewer Michiko Kakutani states that it "reaches a damning conclusion about the presidency". Kakutani also highly recommended the book.

Bloomberg L.P.'s media critic Craig Seligman wrote a scathing review of the book, calling Woodward far too deferential to President Bush and saying that "It must have been a challenge for him to walk so confidently with Woodward's lips attached to his backside." In a mixed review, American conservative magazine National Review labeled Woodward's leaking of the government's eavesdropping program "disgraceful" and stated that it "would be helpful for the United States to be in a position to know, and to do so without having the fact publicly advertised."

Foreign Affairs praised the book's "focused" account and argued that it was the best out of Woodward's four books about President Bush. The New York Times generally praised the book and referred to its reporting as "wonderfully illuminating". Its review concluded:

Woodward's own judgment of the war and of Bush doesn't really matter. In the course of four books he has given readers the conversations and documents we need to reach our own judgments. He has also, however unevenly and imperfectly, supplied enough synthesis and analysis to make that judgment genuinely informed. Sure, these books can be a slog. But they stand as the fullest story yet of the Bush presidency and of the war that is likely to be its most important legacy.

The New York Sun gave a critical review, stating that "Mr. Woodward so drowns the reader in clutter that few arguments, except the obvious, emerge." As well, The New Republic alleged that the figures in the book were portrayed better if they had talked to Woodward beforehand.

== See also ==
- Bush at War
- Plan of Attack
- State of Denial: Bush at War, Part III
- Iraq War troop surge of 2007
