= Ensko =

Ensko is a surname. Notable people with the surname include:

- Robert Ensko (1855–1934), American silver expert and author
- Stephen Guernsey Cook Ensko (1896–1969), American silver expert, son of Robert
