= Alice Mayhew =

American editor (1932–2020)

- Born: June 14, 1932; Brooklyn, New York City
- Died: February 4, 2020 (aged 87); Manhattan, New York City
- Occupation: Editor

Alice E. Mayhew (June 14, 1932 – February 4, 2020) was an American editor who was vice president and editorial director for Simon & Schuster. Mayhew edited many notable authors, which include Bob Woodward, President Jimmy Carter, Doris Kearns Goodwin, David Brooks, and Ruth Bader Ginsburg. Mayhew was known for publishing books about Washington, D.C., such as All the President's Men by Bob Woodward and Carl Bernstein using a genre which is known as a political narrative, a subgenre of creative nonfiction.

== Life and career ==
Mayhew was born in 1932 in Brooklyn, New York City, the daughter of Alice and Leonard S. Mayhew. She was raised in the Bronx. She worked at Simon & Schuster since at least the mid 1970s. Books she edited are recognized as having made news through seven presidencies. Mayhew was well-known for working with authors to create narrative or creative nonfiction works, especially those focused on history, politics and Washington, D.C.

While Mayhew did not invent the Washington narrative genre, she helped popularize it in 1974 with the publication of All the President's Men. Richard E. Snyder bought the book for Simon & Schuster and Mayhew was the editor. The book's narrative was less about Watergate and more about Woodward and Bernstein's journalistic research and uncovering of the story. According to Michael Korda in his biography, this book changed America and played a major role in bringing down President Richard Nixon. More importantly, Korda wrote, "it transformed book publishing into a red-hot part of the media" and put Simon & Schuster on the "map as a major publishing force."

Mayhew continued her partnership with Bob Woodward. In 2008, it was reported that the then-71-year-old Mayhew continued to acquire and edit books and was partnering once again with Bob Woodward on the book, The War Within: A Secret White House History 2006–2008. In 2018, ten years later, Bob Woodward also thanked Alice Mayhew in the acknowledgments of his book, Fear: Trump in the White House in 2018. Woodward mentions that Mayhew has been his editor at Simon & Schuster for 46 years and this is their 19th book together. He credits Mayhew's "brilliant engagement on the concept for the book, the pace, structure and tone." When released Fear: Trump in the White House became the fastest opener in Simon & Schuster, selling one million copies in its first week of publication.

Attorney Robert Barnett, who has represented a number of her clients, described this style to The New York Times: "She's great at taking things that are in the daily reporting cycle and putting them into book form with new material that goes beyond what you get daily. These are books that look back, but not years later." Mayhew was known to be meticulous about creating narrative and finding themes in the books she edited. In the same article, author Steven Brill, describes how Mayhew gave him a copy of a book on the Titanic while he was working on his 1978 book, The Teamsters. When Brill complained that the Titanic did not have anything to do with Teamsters, Mayhew told him, "Think of this as a narrative form."

In later years, Mayhew came under some criticism for delegating editing, having two well-known authors be accused of plagiarism (Doris Kearns Goodwin and Stephen Ambrose), and producing popular history books with little to no sourcing.

in 2014, Simon & Schuster celebrated their 90th anniversary with a list of the staff's favorite 90 titles published during those years. 29 titles on the list had been edited by Mayhew including Our Bodies, Our Selves.

Not much is known about Mayhew's personal biography. She was described as a diminutive woman with a raspy voice and was known to be tough and rigorous. She died at her home in Manhattan on February 4, 2020, at the age of 87.

== Notable authors ==
- Bob Woodward
- Carl Bernstein
- David Brooks
- David Maraniss
- David Rieff
- Diane McWhorter
- Doris Kearns Goodwin
- William Greider
- Evan Thomas
- Frances FitzGerald
- Garry Wills
- Harold Holzer
- J. Anthony Lukas
- James B. Stewart
- Jimmy Carter
- Richard Cohen
- Richard Reeves
- Robert Lindsey
- Robert G. Kaiser
- Ron Suskind
- Ruth Bader Ginsburg
- Sally Bedell Smith
- Stephen E. Ambrose
- Steven Brill
- Taylor Branch
- Walter Isaacson
