= Trump tapes =

Trump tapes may refer to:

- Donald Trump Access Hollywood tape, recorded discussion between Donald Trump and Billy Bush in 2005
- Pee tape allegation is an unproven rumor that Trump was secretly filmed in the presidential suite of the Moscow Ritz Carlton hotel with prostitutes in November 2013. Michael Cohen and Trump first learned of the rumor in late 2013, shortly after Trump left Moscow, whereas the public first learned of it from the Steele dossier in January 2017.
- The Trump Tapes, 2022 audiobook release of interviews between Donald Trump and journalist Bob Woodward
