= State of Denial =

2006 nonfiction book by Bob Woodward

State of Denial: Bush at War, Part III
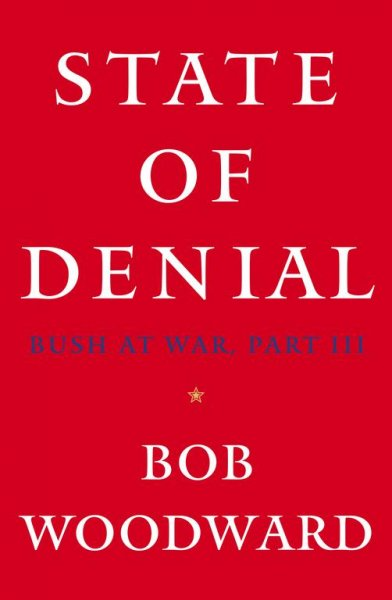
- First edition cover
- Author: Bob Woodward
- Language: English
- Genre: Nonfiction
- Publisher: Simon & Schuster
- Publication date: 2006-09-30
- Publication place: United States
- Media type: Hardback
- Pages: 560 pages
- ISBN: 0-7432-7223-4
- OCLC: 71791999
- Dewey Decimal: 973.931 22
- LC Class: E903.3 .W67 2006
- Preceded by: Plan of Attack
- Followed by: The War Within: A Secret White House History (2006–2008)

State of Denial: Bush at War, Part III (ISBN 0-7432-7223-4) is a 2006 book by Bob Woodward that examines how the George W. Bush administration managed the Iraq War after the 2003 invasion. It follows Woodward's previous books on the Bush administration, Bush at War and Plan of Attack. Based on interviews with a number of people in the Bush administration (although not with George W. Bush himself), the book makes a number of allegations about the administration.

Newsweek magazine presented a special excerpt of the book. Assistant Managing Editor Evan Thomas and Senior White House Correspondent Richard Wolffe reported on the potential fallout for Bush and US Secretary of Defense Donald Rumsfeld and analyzed the administration's response.

== Reported in the book ==
According to Woodward's book:

- Andrew Card resigned because of concerns about how the public would perceive the administration's handling of Iraq in the future and that he had twice tried to persuade Bush to replace Rumsfeld.
- Former US Secretary of State Henry Kissinger met regularly with Bush and Vice President Dick Cheney to offer advice on the War in Iraq. Kissinger confirmed in recorded interviews with Woodward that the advice was the same as he had given in an August 12, 2005, column in the Washington Post: "Victory over the insurgency is the only meaningful exit strategy."
- CIA Director George Tenet and J. Cofer Black met with then-National Security Advisor Condoleezza Rice on July 10, 2001, to warn her about an imminent Al Qaeda attack and were disappointed Rice wasn't alarmed enough by the warning, although Rice's friend Philip D. Zelikow (also executive director of the 9/11 Commission) also says in the book that the warning wasn't specific enough to enable the government to take a specific action to counter it (pages 49–52).
- Tony Blair repeatedly complained that the US government denied UK security services access to intelligence; although intelligence they collected was being stored on the SIPRNet, SIPRNet's classified information was barred to all foreign nationals, such as British and Australian troops in Iraq. After Bush signed a directive (along with Rumsfeld and acting CIA director John McLaughlin) ordering that "NOFORN would no longer apply to the British and Australians when they were planning for combat operations, training with the Americans or engaged in counterterrorism activities", officials within the Pentagon instead began creating a parallel SIPRNet to which classified information would be slowly copied over after review.
- Al Gore reportedly promising the position Chairman of The Joint Chiefs of Staff to General Eric Shinseki if he won the 2000 Presidential Election, causing a heavy sparked of anger among military community, especially knowing that Army has dominated most of the Chairman of the Joint Chiefs of Staff position in which it was Shinseki service branch and at that time served as Army Chief of Staff. The incumbent Chairman of the Joint Chiefs of Staff during the 2000 Presidential Election, General Hugh Shelton is also from Army and so does his predecessor General John Shaliskasvili and General Colin Powell all from the Army. This was the primary reason why many from military community chose to support George W. Bush instead of Al Gore. Following assuming the Presidency, instead of Shinseki it was Air Force General Richard B. Myers whom Bush chosen to be the next Chairman of the Joint Chiefs of Staff.
- Although members of the Bush administration publicly said the situation in Iraq was improving, internal reports and memos distributed between various government agencies, including the White House and The Pentagon, acknowledged the situation was worsening.
- Senate Minority Leader (later Majority Leader) Harry Reid (D-Nevada) said of Bush, "I just can't stand him". Reid so dislikes Bush that he can't bear watching his speeches, instead having aides brief him on them afterward.
- Shinseki reportedly despised the Bush administration due to not being promoted to Chairman of the Joint Chiefs of Staff, as was supposedly promised to him by Al Gore. Shinseki constantly criticized the administration and opposed the administration's military policy.
- Condoleezza Rice hired old friend Philip D. Zelikow to go to Iraq and give her a detailed report (and gave him authority to go anywhere and ask anything). On February 10, 2005, two weeks after Rice became Secretary of State, Zelikow gave her a 15-page, single-spaced memo. Zelikow wrote: "At this point Iraq remains a failed state shadowed by constant violence and undergoing revolutionary political change."
- Robert D. Blackwill, the National Security Council's top official for Iraq, was deeply disturbed by what he considered the inadequate number of troops on the ground there. He told Rice and Stephen J. Hadley, her deputy, that the NSC needed to do a military review. Rice had made it clear that her authority did not extend to Rumsfeld or the military, and the matter was dropped.
- When Hadley replaced Rice as National Security Advisor, he assessed the problems from the first term. He told a "colleague" on February 5, 2005, "I give us a B-minus for policy development and a D-minus for policy execution."
- General John P. Abizaid, head of US forces in Iraq, visited US Representative John P. Murtha (D-Penn.) in Murtha's office and held up his index finger about a quarter of an inch from his thumb, telling Murtha "We're that far apart" on Iraq policy.
- "One of Kissinger's private criticisms of Bush was that he had no mechanism in place, or even an inclination, to consider the downsides of impending decisions. Alternative courses of action were rarely considered."

== Woodward's possible sources ==
These are some of the speculated sources (speculators in parentheses):

- "Andrew Card [former White House chief of staff], who gives Woodward most of his Oval Office material as far as I can tell, is written up as some kind of hero for engineering his own removal as White House chief of staff," wrote Rich Lowry, editor of National Review. "From what I have read, there is no acknowledgment that some of Bush's difficulties might have been Card's doing, which is the advantage of being a Woodward source." (Michiko Kakutani, reviewing the book in The New York Times, and others also believe Card was a source.)
- The former Saudi Arabian ambassador Prince Bandar bin Sultan (Kakutani)
- George Tenet, former director of the CIA (Kakutani)
- Former Deputy Secretary of State Richard L. Armitage (Kakutani)
- Brent Scowcroft, chair of the President's Intelligence Advisory Board under George W. Bush and national security adviser to George H. W. Bush (Kakutani)

== Woodward's cited sources ==
- Jay Garner, former head of the Iraq postwar planning office ("In an interview last December, I asked Garner ...")
- US Representative John Murtha is cited by Woodward as a source.
- Donald Rumsfeld

== Reviews and critiques ==
- Neoconservative commentator and former speechwriter for President George W. Bush David Frum stated: "Woodward characters are always saying things like 'We've got to get this on track' and 'Fix it.' Bold, decisive — and Woodward loves reporting this boldness and decisiveness. But when things don't get back on track, when they don't get fixed, the question, 'why not?' does not long or deeply interest our chronicler. It is a remarkable fact, but America's most famous living reporter on politics and government is not really very seriously interested in either politics or government."
- Another point about Woodward's book by Frum: "Remember — a Woodward book is not exactly a 'book' as you or I might think of one. It more like a raw intelligence product, full of unverified and often contradictory assertions. Nor is it "written" as you or I might write, that is, by composing one page after another to form a coherent narrative or argument. Rather it is compiled in rough chronological order of incident, without much regard to sequencing of thought. So while it is possible for someone like NSC official Meghan O'Sullivan to be presented as a person of rare competence on p. 127 and as utterly unfit for her job on p. 331, it is equally possible for these contradictions to appear much closer to one another."
- "The story is classic Bob Woodward: fly-on-the-wall descriptions of super-secret discussions, details missed by every other reporter, a juicy scoop" writes The Wall Street Journal's Jonathan Karl. The book "is replete with [typical] Woodwardian reporting: secret meetings recounted in vivid detail, complete with lengthy, verbatim quotations of what key players said to each other as the story unfolded. Once again, it all reads as if Bob Woodward was lurking in the background as the meetings happened, taking exceptionally detailed notes. But of course he was not there. We learn not only what the president and all his men said but also what unspoken thoughts raced through their minds. But Mr. Woodward wasn't inside their heads either, it is safe to say." Concluding that "Mr. Woodward attempts to write like a novelist, not a journalist," Karl adds that "As more than a few people have noted over the course of Mr. Woodward's long career, his narratives are propelled in part by who talks to him and, just as important, who gives him the best, most detailed and colorful descriptions of what went on in all those secret meetings."
- "This is a fun book, a weighty book, and a political tour-de-force. But it isn't journalism. Instead it lies somewhere between an historical novel such as Burr by Gore Vidal, and books such as Rise of the Vulcans by James Mann or Imperial Hubris by Michael Scheuer. State of Denial has had great influence among the chattering classes in Washington and I believe influenced the recent congressional elections and led to the downfall of Rumsfeld. This book is highly recommended."
