= The Trump Tapes =

2022 audiobook release of interviews between Bob Woodward and Donald Trump

- Author: Bob Woodward
- Subject: Presidency of Donald Trump; COVID-19 pandemic in the United States
- Publisher: Simon & Schuster
- Publication date: October 24, 2022
- Media type: audiobook, print, e-book
- Pages: 464
- ISBN: 9781797124735
- Preceded by: Peril
- Followed by: War

The Trump Tapes: Bob Woodward's Twenty Interviews with President Donald Trump is a 2022 nonfiction audiobook of 20 interviews between journalist Bob Woodward and Donald Trump conducted from 2016 to 2020. In addition to the interviews between Woodward and Trump, The Trump Tapes also includes the raw transcripts of 27 letters between Trump and North Korean Chairman Kim Jong Un, 25 of which were previously obtained by Woodward in 2020 for use in Rage. In total, the book contains around 11 and a half hours of audio. Originally released as an audiobook, the transcript was later published in both print and digital formats.

Trump sued Woodward and Simon & Schuster in late January 2023, arguing that the published tapes violated his copyright. The author and publisher responded that the lawsuit did not have merit, as the interviews had Trump's consent and were on the record.

== Background ==
In March 2016, Bob Woodward and Washington Post national political reporter Robert Costa conducted an interview with Trump during his presidential campaign at the Trump International Hotel in Washington, D.C. Trump was accompanied by campaign manager Corey Lewandowski, press secretary Hope Hicks and his son Donald Trump Jr. During the interview, Woodward contended that "a lot of angst and rage and distress" was present in the Republican Party, to which Trump replied that "I bring rage out. I do bring rage out. I always have... I don't know if that's an asset or a liability, but whatever it is, I do." Later in the interview, Costa referred to "The Obama Doctrine", an interview between then President of the United States Barack Obama and journalist for The Atlantic Jeffrey Goldberg. On Russia's power after their military intervention in the Syrian civil war, Obama said that "Real power means you can get what you want without having to exert violence. Russia was much more powerful when Ukraine looked like an independent country but was a kleptocracy that he could pull the strings on." In response, Trump stated that "I think there’s a certain truth to that. Real power is through respect. Real power is, I don’t even want to use the word, fear." These quotes would inspire the titles for two of Woodward's books on Trump: Rage and Fear: Trump in the White House respectively. This interview is included as part of The Trump Tapes. Costa would collaborate again with Woodward on his third book on Trump, Peril.

In August 2018, Trump called Woodward shortly after Fear: Trump in the White House was already finalized. In the call, Trump said that "You know I'm very open to you. I think you've always been fair", and wished that Woodward had contacted him for an interview prior to the book's release. Once Woodward informed Trump of the book's critical nature, Trump predicted that be the book would be "negative", "bad" and "very inaccurate", because "accurate is that nobody's ever done a better job than I'm doing as president". After the book's release, Trump denounced it as "just another bad book" and called eyewitness accounts featured in the book as "made up". Additionally, Trump claimed that Woodward had "had a lot of credibility problems ... He wanted to write the book a certain way ... I never spoke to him." and questioned if Woodward was a Democratic Party operative.

Despite publicly condemning Fear: Trump in the White House, Trump was optimistic when offered the chance to be interviewed by Woodward for its sequel book, Rage. Trump encouraged members of his administration to provide interviews to Woodward for Rage, giving Woodward access to senior advisor Jared Kushner, national security advisor Robert C. O'Brien, and deputy national security advisor Matthew Pottinger. White House press secretary Kayleigh McEnany said that Trump gave access to Woodward because he was "the most transparent president in history". Trump gave 18 digital-tape recorded interviews to Woodward in the Oval Office and at night on the telephone, lasting nine hours in total. Trump reportedly asked his aides repeatedly about when the book would be published. After the book's release however, Trump criticized the book, calling it "very boring". The 18 interviews make up the bulk of The Trump Tapes.

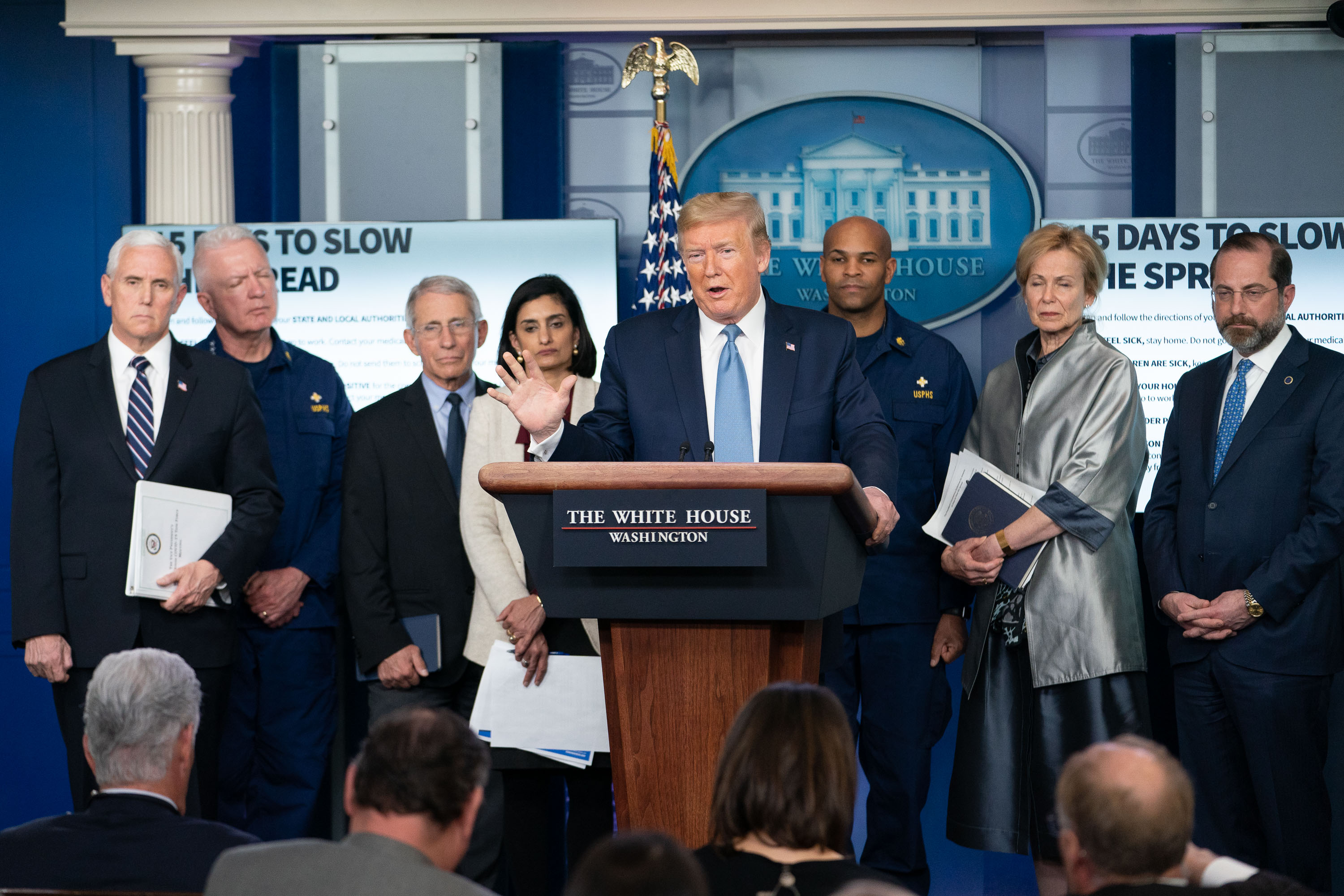
The White House Coronavirus Task Force briefing the media in March 2020. Trump received severe backlash for privately admitting to downplaying the severity of the virus.

The most widely-reported interview between Trump and Woodward was made on February 7, 2020. During the interview, Trump and Woodward discussed COVID-19. Trump told Woodward that he "wanted to always play it down... because I don't want to create a panic" despite being told that it may be five times "more deadly" than the common flu. Though Trump had publicly acknowledged the danger of the virus in February, he claimed that it was "under control". Both Trump and Woodward were criticized for the interview. Trump was lambasted by medical experts and politicians for deliberately downplaying the virus. In response to this revelation, Trump's opponent in the 2020 presidential election Joe Biden referred to Trump's COVID-19 response as "almost criminal". White House press secretary Kayleigh McEnany responded to the interview by arguing "The president was expressing calm and his actions reflect that”. Trump later clarified that he downplayed the threat of the virus so that he could "show a calmness." Woodward was criticized for not publicly revealing Trump's thoughts on the COVID-19 pandemic in the United States prior to the imminent release of the book. Woodward said in an interview that the book would have been able to provide more context than a news story and that "the biggest problem I had, which is always a problem with Trump, is I didn't know if it was true" and that if he "had done the story at that time about what he knew in February, that's not telling us anything we didn't know."

On August 14, 2020, after Rage had already been finalized, Trump once again called Woodward to ask about the book and its content. During the call, Trump and Woodward argue over the former's communication during the COVID-19 pandemic, with Trump defending his hesitation to immediately respond to COVID-19 by stating he was focusing on protecting the economy and that "Nothing more could have been done.” When Woodward mentioned that Trump earned rare praise from New York Times columnist Tom Friedman for the Israel–United Arab Emirates normalization agreement, Trump responded by saying "He’s come a long way. The next one I need is you... But it looks like I don’t have it on this book, but we’ll get you sometime later, I guess."

=== Letters with Kim Jong Un ===
As a presidential candidate in 2016, Trump had opposed the Obama administration's policy of "strategic patience" towards North Korea and supported an open dialogue while simultaneously asserting a tough stance. On June 12, 2019, after the 2018 Singapore Summit and 2019 Hanoi Summit in which Trump became the first sitting U.S. President to visit North Korea and the first to meet the leader of North Korea, Trump announced that he received a letter from Kim Jong Un which he described as "beautiful". Kim later received a reply from Trump, describing Trump's reply as "excellent" and referring to President Trump as the "supreme leader" of the United States. These two letters would remain the only ones publicly known until Woodward revealed the existence of 25 other letters between Trump and Kim exchanged from April 2018 to August 2019 in preparation for the release of Rage. These letters would later be retrieved by the Federal Bureau of Investigation during their search of Mar-a-Lago in 2022. The transcripts to these letters are included within The Trump Tapes.

== Reception ==
Many reviewers noted the historical importance of The Trump Tapes, but opinions differed regarding Woodward's interviewing and conclusions. Ron Elving of NPR News was positive toward the audiobook, affirming that "There is no question that hearing Trump has an impact that reading alone cannot match." Lloyd Green wrote in The Guardian that The Trump Tapes was a "chilling warning for US democracy" and describes it as "disturbingly relevant". Laura Miller of Slate had mixed opinions, admitting that "Historians, perhaps, will want to hear all of this, and Woodward has long been taken with the notion that he is a kind of historian, that his books will be enshrined in the annals of the nation." but also that "Woodward and so many of the people who worked for Trump continued to kid themselves about who he was and what he was capable of, even after spending hours with the man." George Packer was even more critical, viewing the book as an excuse to needlessly report on Trump. Packer wrote in The Atlantic that "Trump still understands the game he’s playing better than the press does. He does something outrageous—for example, tells Woodward that he, the president, takes no responsibility for the pandemic that is killing tens of thousands of Americans. Woodward tells the rest of us in the second of his three earlier Trump books, and then he tells us again in The Trump Tapes. Americans buy the book and read, we buy the audiobook and listen, and we’re appalled by Trump’s shamelessness, appalled and also bored, because nothing is new, and nothing happens."

== Lawsuit ==
In January 2023, Trump filed a lawsuit in the United States District Court for the Northern District of Florida against Woodward and Simon & Schuster for $50 million, accusing them of “systematic usurpation, manipulation, and exploitation of audio”. The lawsuit alleges that Trump never agreed to his voice being used in an audiobook when he was interviewed for Rage. Woodward and Simon & Schuster reiterated the historical importance of the audio, and claimed that the lawsuit was "without merit". In April 2023, lawyers representing Woodward and Simon & Schuster filed a motion to dismiss, citing Trump's lack of a copyright registration filing and stating that government employees cannot claim ownership of recorded interviews made while in office. In May 2023, Woodward and Simon & Schuster's lawyers filed two more motions to dismiss, stating that "Said audio was protected material, subject to various limitations on use and distribution—as a matter of copyright, license, contract, basic principles of the publishing industry, and core values of fairness and consent.” In August, Judge M. Casey Rodgers ordered that the case be transferred to the United States District Court for the Southern District of New York. Lawyers representing Woodward and Simon & Schuster again filed a motion to dismiss in September. In 2025, the lawsuit was dismissed.

Intellectual property lawyers unrelated to the case expressed intrigue toward the suit due to the unexplored nature between American copyright law and recorded interviews.

== Bibliography ==
- Axelrod, Tal (September 4, 2018). "Trump: Woodward has had 'a lot of credibility problems'". The Hill. Archived from the original on November 9, 2020.
- Blake, Aaron (September 4, 2018). "Transcript: Phone call between President Trump and journalist Bob Woodward". The Washington Post. Archived from the original on September 8, 2018.
- Cook, Nancy; Thompson, Alex (September 9, 2020). "Behind Woodward's September surprise: White House aides saw a train wreck coming, then jumped aboard". Politico. Archived from the original on June 1, 2023.
- Elving, Ron (October 23, 2022). "Woodward's taped time with Trump reveals much about both the author and his subject". NPR. Archived from the original on February 3, 2023.
- Gangel, Jamie; Herb, Jeremy (September 9, 2020). "'A magical force': New Trump-Kim letters provide window into their 'special friendship'". CNN. Archived from the original on June 9, 2023.
- Gangel, Jamie; Stuart, Elizabeth; Herb, Jeremy (October 18, 2022). "Exclusive: Bob Woodward releasing new audiobook 'The Trump Tapes' with eight hours of recorded interviews". CNN. Archived from the original on February 3, 2023.
- Green, Lloyd (October 30, 2022). "The Trump Tapes: Bob Woodward's chilling warning for US democracy". The Guardian. ISSN 0261-3077. Archived from the original on February 3, 2023.
- Izadi, Elahe (October 26, 2022). "What 'The Trump Tapes' reveal about Bob Woodward". Washington Post. ISSN 0190-8286.
- Miller, Laura (October 31, 2022). "Listening to All 11½ Hours of Bob Woodward's Trump Interviews Might Be the Only Cure for Trumpism". Slate. ISSN 1091-2339. Archived from the original on February 3, 2023.
- Smith, David (November 20, 2022). "'It's on the tape': Bob Woodward on Donald Trump's 'criminal behavior'". The Guardian. ISSN 0261-3077. Archived from the original on February 3, 2023.
- "Transcript: Bob Woodward, Author, 'The Trump Tapes'". Washington Post. October 31, 2022. ISSN 0190-8286.
- Zwirz, Elizabeth. "Trump asks if Bob Woodward is 'Dem operative' amid explosive book details". Fox News. Archived from the original on September 18, 2018.
