= Bridge in Yardley Borough =

- U.S. National Register of Historic Places
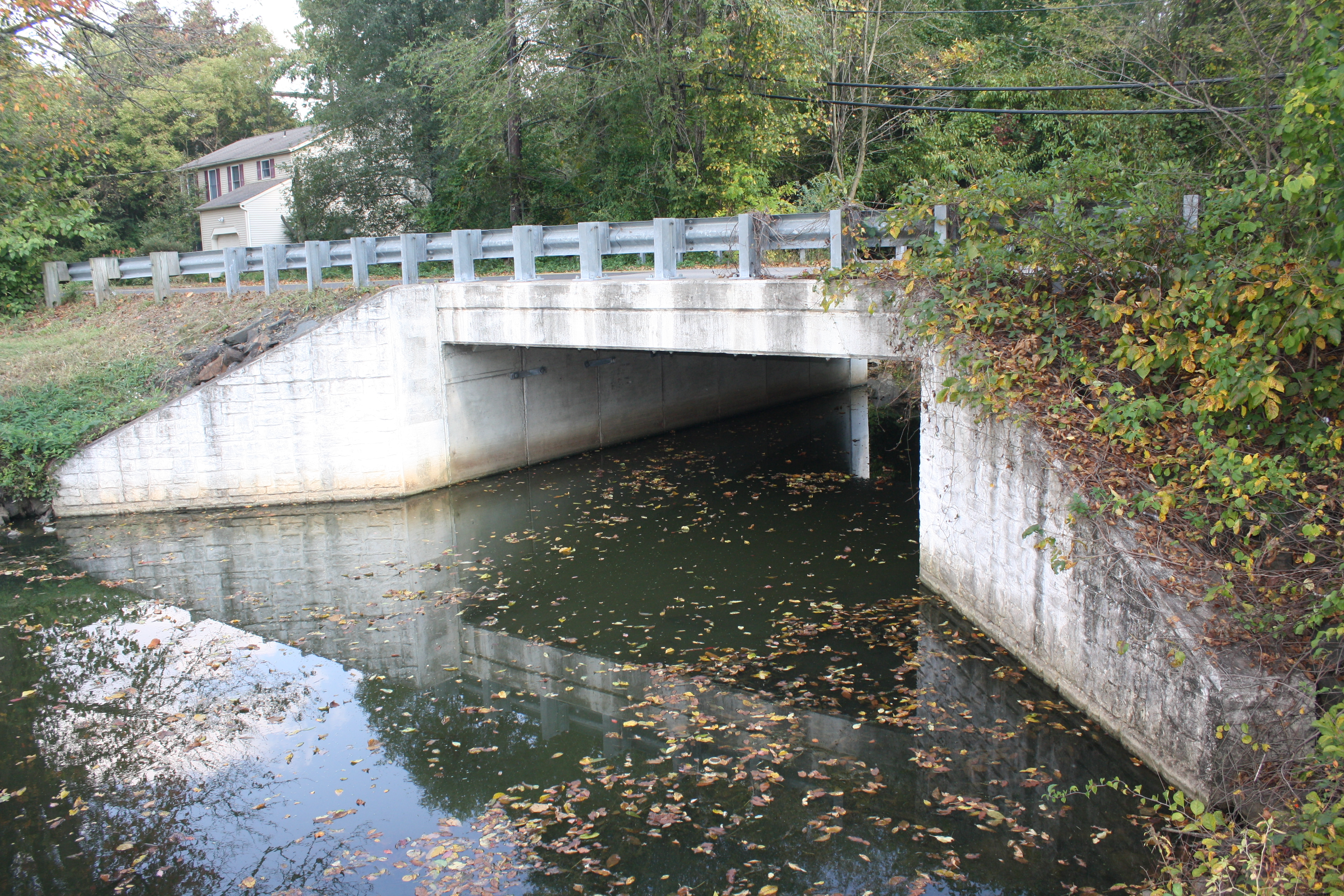
- Bridge in Yardley Borough, October 2012

- Location within Pennsylvania Location within the United States
- Location: Reading Avenue over VanHorn Creek, Scammells Corner, Pennsylvania
- Coordinates: 40°14′3″N 74°50′2″W
- Area: less than one acre
- Built: 1889
- Architectural style: Single span stone arch
- MPS: Highway Bridges Owned by the Commonwealth of Pennsylvania, Department of Transportation TR
- NRHP reference No.: 88000770
- Added to NRHP: June 22, 1988

Bridge in Yardley Borough was a historic stone arch bridge located at Scammells Corner in Yardley, Bucks County, Pennsylvania. It had a single span, 13 feet long, and was constructed in 1889. It was constructed of coursed rubble masonry.

It was listed on the National Register of Historic Places in 1988. Sometime after listing, the bridge was replaced with a concrete bridge span.
