= Peril (book) =

2021 nonfiction book by Bob Woodward and Robert Costa

- Author: Bob Woodward and Robert Costa
- Subjects: Presidency of Donald Trump; 2020 United States presidential election Presidential transition of Joe Biden; Presidency of Joe Biden
- Genre: Nonfiction
- Published: September 21, 2021
- Publisher: Simon & Schuster
- Publication place: United States
- Media type: Print, e-book, audiobook
- Pages: 512
- ISBN: 978-1982182915 (Hardcover)
- OCLC: 1267411961
- Preceded by: Rage
- Followed by: The Trump Tapes

Peril is a nonfiction book by American journalists Bob Woodward and Robert Costa about the outgoing Trump Administration, as well as the presidential transition and early presidency of Joe Biden. The book was published on September 21, 2021, by Simon & Schuster.

Considered the culmination of Woodward's reporting on Donald Trump, Peril takes its title from an excerpt of Biden's inaugural address. In the speech, Biden proclaimed that Americans "will press forward with speed and urgency, for we have much to do in this winter of peril and possibility." This contrasts with Woodward's previous books about the Trump administration, Fear and Rage, which took their titles from Trump's comments during a March 2016 interview conducted by Woodward and Costa.

== Background ==
Peril acts as the final installment in Woodward's trilogy on Donald Trump, following the publication of Woodward's previous two books about his presidency, Fear and Rage. Longtime Washington Post national political reporter and former Washington Week moderator Robert Costa serves as the co-author of Peril. Having previously collaborated with Woodward in interviews with Trump, Costa has described Woodward as a mentor. The majority of the book was written as an exposé during the final months of Trump's presidency, detailing the administration's response to COVID-19, attempts to overturn the 2020 United States presidential election, and efforts to delay the presidential transition of Joe Biden.

== Content ==
Peril has two narratives: one covering Trump's reelection campaign, and the other following Joe Biden's campaign as he defeats his primary opponent Bernie Sanders and later faces Trump himself.

The conversation between chairman of the Joint Chiefs of Staff Mark Milley and Chinese general Li Zuocheng two days after the 2021 United States Capitol attack is one of the subjects of Peril. The book also reveals new details behind the outgoing Trump administration's efforts to overturn the 2020 presidential election.

== Reception ==
Peril received mixed reviews from critics. Chris Megerian of the Los Angeles Times panned it as a "tedious" read, criticizing Woodward and Costa for "spending more time stacking up anecdotes like bricks than generating new insights into a presidency that has already received exhaustive coverage."

Slate's Fred Kaplan wrote that Peril lacks narrative structure: "Like many of Woodward's past works, this is less a cohesive book than a string of anecdotes, some hair-raising, some less so than they appear to be. Perhaps because it was churned out so quickly, this book contains some very intriguing bits—the hints of a story, but not quite the follow-through—that someone should investigate more thoroughly."

In his New York Times review, John Williams wrote, "Like an installment of a deathless Marvel franchise, for all its spectacle Peril ends with a dismaying sense of prologue."

In a positive appraisal of the book, Kirkus Reviews called Peril "[a] solid work of investigation that, while treading well-covered ground, offers plenty of surprises."
