= War (Woodward book) =

Book by Bob Woodward

- First edition cover
- Author: Bob Woodward
- Language: English
- Subject: American politics
- Genre: Government
- Publisher: Simon & Schuster
- Publication date: October 15, 2024
- Publication place: New York
- Media type: Hardcover
- Pages: 448
- ISBN: 978-1-6680-5227-3
- OCLC: 1458494170
- Preceded by: The Trump Tapes

War is a nonfiction book authored by journalist Bob Woodward and published by Simon & Schuster on October 15, 2024.

== Contents ==
In War, Woodward compares the presidencies of Donald Trump and Joe Biden. He concludes that Trump is worse than Richard Nixon, while his assessment of Biden is more favorable. Woodward alleges that Trump sent scarce COVID-19 tests to Russian president Vladimir Putin during the pandemic. Woodward also alleges that Trump continued his relationship with Putin after his presidency ended, through as many as seven private calls. Senator Lindsey Graham attempted to persuade Trump to move on from his loss in the 2020 presidential election. Graham felt Trump's behavior was becoming more erratic, which he attributed to his legal problems.

Woodward describes Biden as frequently using profanity. He writes that, while he publicly supported Israel during the Gaza war, Biden became exasperated with Israeli prime minister Benjamin Netanyahu's handling of the conflict, feeling he had no strategy. He described Netanyahu as "a fucking liar", a "son of a bitch", and "a bad fucking guy". Biden told Netanyahu that the international community was beginning to regard Israel as a rogue state after Israel conducted an airstrike to kill the Hezbollah commander Fuad Shukr, which also killed three civilians; Netanyahu replied that Shukr was "one of the leading terrorists" and that increased aggression would make Israel more successful in negotiations. Woodward also notes that, during a meeting with Secretary of State Antony Blinken, Saudi Crown Prince Mohammed bin Salman said he personally does not care about establishing a Palestinian state.

According to Woodward, the United States Intelligence Community uncovered Russia's plans to invade Ukraine months in advance, and Biden confronted Putin about it twice during calls in December 2021. During the second call, Putin allegedly threatened a nuclear war. Meanwhile, Ukrainian president Volodymyr Zelenskyy refused to accept the accurate intelligence, even when Kamala Harris made the case to him in person at the Munich Security Conference. According to Woodward, Biden blamed the invasion and Russo-Ukrainian war on former president Barack Obama's handling of Russia's annexation of Crimea, saying that Obama "never took Putin seriously" and "gave him a license to continue". In September 2022, US intelligence assessed there was a 50% chance that Putin would launch a nuclear strike on Ukraine; when confronted, Russian officials claimed that Ukraine was preparing to attack with a dirty bomb.

After Kabul fell to the Taliban following the American withdrawal from Afghanistan, Woodward writes, Biden received a call from former president George W. Bush expressing sympathy; Bush, in reference to the Iraq War, said he knew how it felt to "[get] fucked by [your] intel people". Woodward also reports that Biden regretted nominating Merrick Garland as Attorney General after Garland allowed the Justice Department to prosecute his son Hunter. Regarding Biden's withdrawal from the 2024 presidential election, Blinken said that Biden had been disappointed that Obama did not support him mounting a presidential campaign in 2016, and that this likely motivated his decision to immediately endorse Harris's campaign.

== Reception ==
War received positive reviews from critics. A.O. Scott of The New York Times wrote, that War is "harrowing, riveting stuff, even if you know how it will play out."
