= Stephen Guernsey Cook Ensko =

American silver expert (1896–1969)

Stephen G. C. Ensko
- Ensko circa 1950-1960
- Born: Stephen Guernsey Cook Ensko; May 9, 1896; Manhattan, New York City
- Died: December 18, 1969 (aged 73); Manhattan, New York City
- Occupation: Silver expert
- Spouse: Dorothea (m. 1918)
- Children: Dorothea Charlotte Ensko (1920–?); Stephen W. Ensko (1922–1944); Alice Elizabeth Ensko (1924–1999)
- Parent(s): Robert Ensko (1855-1934); Mary Elizabeth Blakeley (1857-?)

Stephen Guernsey Cook Ensko (May 9, 1896 – December 18, 1969) was an expert on American antique silver. His book is the standard reference work for antique silver.

== Biography ==
Stephen was born in 1896 in Manhattan, New York City to Robert Ensko (1855–1934) and Mary Elizabeth Blakeley (1857–?). His siblings include: Robert Ensko II (1880–1971) who worked as a lace dealer; Charlotte Ensko (1882–?) who married Milton Ernest Horn (1876–1929); Lamont Northrope Ensko (1890–1987) who worked in the family silver business; Elathene Amanda Ensko (1898–1981) who married George Robert Christie (1895–1996); and William Edward Ensko (c1900–1918) who was a sergeant in the US Army who was killed in a car accident in France during World War I.

Stephen married Dorothea J. Winterloff (1892–1977) of Germany on June 4, 1918 in Manhattan and they had three children: Dorothea Charlotte Ensko (1920– ) who married Vernon Charles Wyle (1913–1986); Stephen William Ensko (1922–1945) who was a 2nd Lieutenant in the US Army who was killed in action in World War II; and Alice Elizabeth Ensko (1924-1999) who married George M. Keller II on December 24, 1944, and later married Alfred Woodward (1913-2007), the Illinois judge.

Stephen registered for the draft on June 5, 1918 but he did not serve. At the time he was working as an antique dealer at 598 Madison Avenue, and he was living in Freeport, New York on Long Island.

At the death of his father in 1934, Stephen took over Robert Ensko, Inc. which had its showroom at 682 Lexington Avenue in Manhattan. He continued to commission the creation of reproductions of antique silver, to be sold under the Ensko name.

He reissued and updated his father's book Makers of Early American Silver and published it as American Silversmiths and their Marks in 1927. The first edition was limited to 310 copies, and as told in Robert Alan Green's book on American Silversmith's marks, many of the first edition copies were destroyed in an accident. The 1992 edition had the following introduction:

In the world of American silver, one book has remained the indispensable reference guide, the quintessential vade mecum for any serious collector. This is Ensko's American Silversmiths and Their Marks, first compiled in 1915 by Robert Ensko, revised and enlarged by his son Stephen in 1927, again reissued with corrections and additional names and marks as Ensko III in 1948, and now available in this elegantly printed and up-to-date fourth edition. ... Their New York firm, founded in 1878 and finally dissolved in 1970, was central to the study and appreciation of fine American silver, and, in the world of collectors, the Ensko name was synonymous with high quality and taste. ...

Ensko published a second edition of the book in 1937 and a third in 1948. He also published English Silver 1675-1825 in 8 volumes in 1937.

== Death ==
Stephen died in 1969 in New York City. His widow, Dorothea, died in 1977 in Wheaton, Illinois.

== The Ensko books ==
- 1915 Makers of Early American Silver; Robert Ensko (1852–1934)
- 1927 American Silversmiths and Their Marks; Stephen Ensko (1896–1969)
- 1937 American Silversmiths and Their Marks; Stephen Ensko (1896–1969)
- 1937 English Silver 1675–1825 in 8 volumes; Stephen Ensko and Edward Wenham
- 1948 American Silversmiths and Their Marks; Stephen Ensko (1896–1969)
- 1983 American Silversmiths and Their Marks softcover version of 1948; Stephen Ensko (1896–1969) ISBN 0-486-24428-8
- 1990 American Silversmiths and Their Marks; Dorothea Charlotte Ensko (1920– ) and Vernon Charles Wyle (1912–1986) ISBN 0-87923-778-3
