= Elsa Walsh =

American journalist and author

- Born: 1957 (age 68–69)
- Education: University of California, Berkeley
- Occupations: Journalist, author
- Notable work: Divided Lives: The Public and Private Struggles of 3 Accomplished Women
- Spouse: Bob Woodward (m. 1989)
- Children: 1

Elsa Walsh (born 1957) is an American journalist and author. In 1989 she was a finalist for the Pulitzer Prize, and she released her book Divided Lives: The Public and Private Struggles of 3 Accomplished Women in 1995. Walsh has worked for both The Washington Post and The New Yorker.

== Early life ==
Elsa Walsh grew up in an Irish-Catholic family with five siblings. She is a graduate of the University of California, Berkeley, where she was elected to Phi Beta Kappa, and began her career as a journalist in 1980.

== Career ==
Walsh has worked as a staff reporter for The Washington Post. In 1989 she and her fellow reporter Benjamin Weiser were finalists for the Pulitzer prize for their 1988 "series about how court secrecy procedures have created a system of private justice within the public courts," according to the prize committee. The four-article series investigated the role of judges in hiding important safety information from the public through approving confidentiality agreements and sealing court records.

External videos
- Booknotes interview with Walsh on Divided Lives, September 17, 1995, C-SPAN

In 1995 she published her book Divided Lives: The Public and Private Struggles of 3 Accomplished Women, in which she interviewed three women regarding their "experiences juggling marriage and a career". The women interviewed for the book were 60 Minutes reporter Meredith Vieira, orchestra conductor Rachael Worby, and breast surgeon Alison Estabrook; Walsh also interviewed members of the women's families as well as their work peers. She later became a staff writer for The New Yorker, where her work included political reporting in the US as well as profiles on figures such as Saudi Prince Bandar, Ted Kennedy, Tipper Gore, and Harry Reid. She has also appeared on political talk shows such as Hardball with Chris Matthews. Walsh is also an editor on the books of Bob Woodward, her husband.

== Personal life ==
Walsh is married to The Washington Post journalist Bob Woodward. The two met at the Post, and wed in 1989. The two of them were featured in the 2020 book What Makes a Marriage Last: 40 Celebrated Couples Share with Us the Secrets to a Happy Life by Phil Donahue and Marlo Thomas. Walsh has also appeared on the television series Barefoot Contessa, as a guide to host Ina Garten on a trip to Washington, DC. Walsh has one daughter and a stepdaughter.
