= Obama's Wars =

2010 nonfiction book by Bob Woodward

- Cover of Obama's Wars by Bob Woodward
- Author: Bob Woodward
- Language: English
- Subject: Political science, United States, Afghanistan, Barack Obama
- Publisher: Simon & Schuster
- Publication date: September 27, 2010
- Publication place: United States
- Media type: Print, ebook, audiobook
- Pages: 441
- ISBN: 978-1-4391-7249-0
- Preceded by: The War Within: A Secret White House History (2006–2008)

Obama's Wars is a 2010 book written by Pulitzer Prize–winning investigative journalist Bob Woodward. The book was published by Simon & Schuster and released on September 27, 2010. It focuses on the internal debates and divisions within the Obama administration regarding the handling of the United States' involvement in the ongoing Iraq and Afghanistan wars. Woodward was interviewed by ABC News anchor Diane Sawyer to promote the book as well as PBS journalist Charlie Rose.

== White House response ==
In comments made to the press on September 22, 2010, White House Press Secretary Robert Gibbs responded to the book by stating, "I will say I think that the book portrays a thoughtful, vigorous policy process that led us to a strategy that gives us the best chance at achieving our objectives and goals in Afghanistan." He also commented, "I hope people will read the whole book and see that we had a policy that—and a situation in Afghanistan that had been neglected for seven years, that was badly under-resourced and desperately in need of new ideas and a new strategy. And the President shepherded through a process, again, that was thoughtful and deliberate and focused to come up with what was our best chance at success."

== Recommendation by Osama bin Laden ==
In a video recorded shortly before his killing and titled "Message to the American People," Osama bin Laden recommended reading Obama's Wars to gain insight into the mishandling of the Iraq and Afghanistan wars by President Barack Obama.

Carlos Lozada, also of The Washington Post, called upon Woodward for his reaction to learning that Obama's Wars was one of the books Navy SEALs retrieved from Osama bin Laden's final Abbottabad hideout, after they killed him in 2011. Lozada quoted Woodward's comment that, if bin Laden had read his book more carefully, he would have returned to his mountain cave.
