= Meghan Roche =

American fashion model

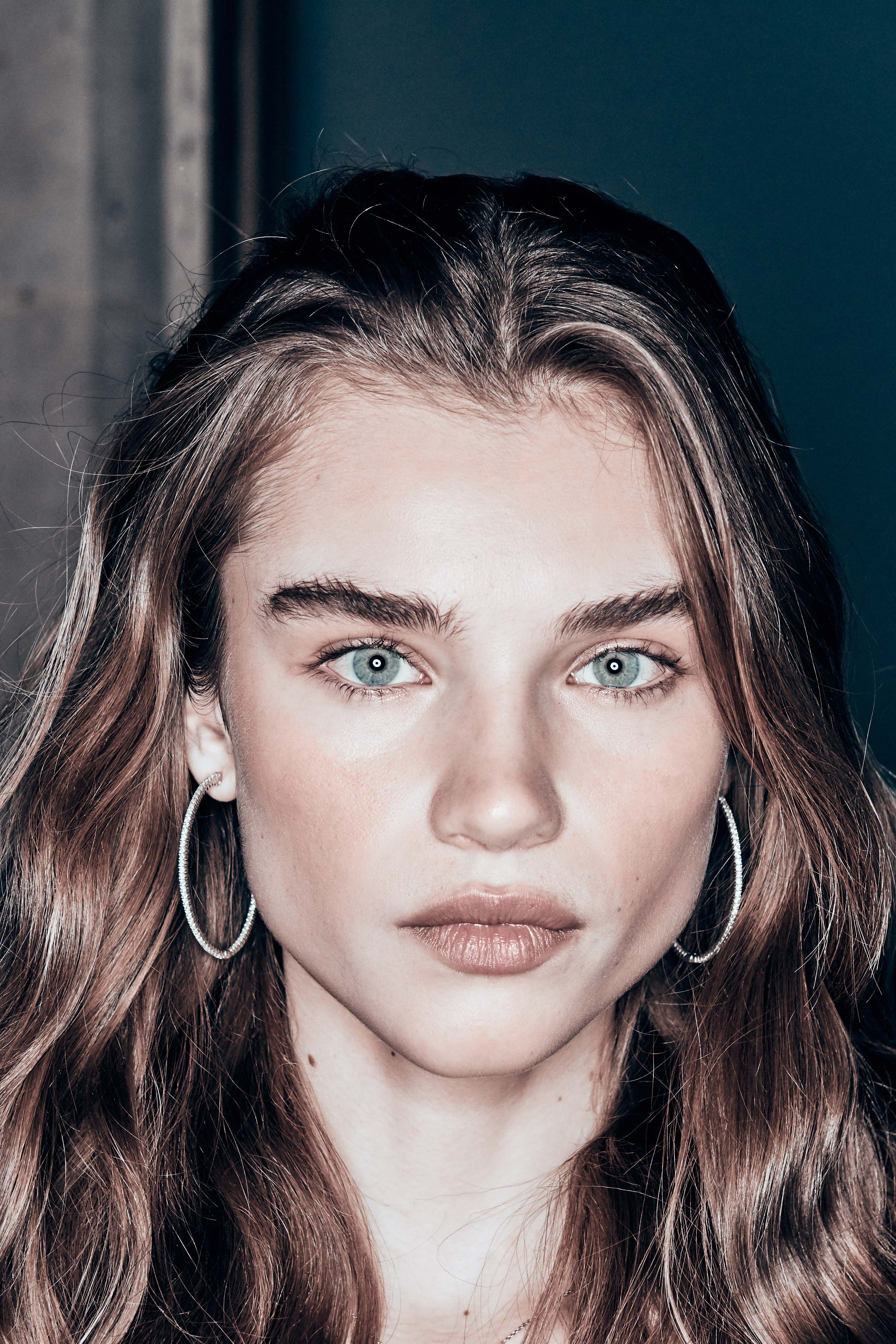
- Roche at the 2019 Paris Fashion Week Autumn Winter
- Born: September 13, 2000 (age 25); Yardley, Pennsylvania, U.S.
- Modeling information
- Height: 1.77 m (5 ft 9 1/2 in)
- Hair color: dark blonde
- Eye color: Blue
- Agency: DNA Models (New York); Storm Management (London); Unique Models (Copenhagen)

Meghan Roche (born September 13, 2000) is an American model. Known for her chiseled cheekbones and her eyebrows, Roche has become one of the most in demand models.

== Career ==
Roche was discovered when she was 13 years old while getting her eyebrows waxed in a spa salon. Roche shared that she had no interest in modeling at first and that she was a tomboy.

Roche originally signed with Women Management at age 15, and debuted as a Givenchy exclusive, including a campaign shot by Steven Meisel.

The next season, F/W 2018, Roche was a semi-exclusive for Alexander Wang and also walked for brands including Derek Lam, Carolina Herrera, Fendi (which she opened), Versace, Yves Saint Laurent, Ralph Lauren, Max Mara, Tod's, Missoni, Off-White, Chanel, Sonia Rykiel, Stella McCartney, H&M, Dolce & Gabbana, and Roberto Cavalli.

In 2018, Roche was deemed a "Top Newcomer" by models.com. She also ranks on their "Money Girls" list.

Roche signed with IMG Models in 2019. In 2019, her former agency Women Management sued her current agency IMG Models for an alleged breach of contract for what is known as "poaching" her to the rival agency as her career expanded, including campaigns for Marc Jacobs and Miu Miu.

As of 2023 Roche is signed with DNA Models.
