= Fear: Trump in the White House =

2018 nonfiction book by Bob Woodward about Donald Trump's presidency

- Author: Bob Woodward
- Subject: Presidency of Donald Trump
- Genre: Nonfiction
- Published: September 11, 2018
- Publisher: Simon & Schuster
- Publication place: United States
- Media type: Print, e-book, audiobook
- Pages: 448
- ISBN: 978-1-5011-7551-0 (Hardcover)
- OCLC: 1046982157
- Followed by: Rage

Fear: Trump in the White House is a nonfiction book by American journalist Bob Woodward about the first presidency of Donald Trump. The book was released on September 11, 2018. Woodward based the book on hundreds of hours of interviews with members of the Trump administration. The book's publisher Simon & Schuster announced that it had sold 1.1 million copies (across all formats) in the first week of its release, making it the fastest selling opener in the company's history.

== Background ==
Best known for his role exposing the Watergate scandal that led to Richard Nixon's resignation from the presidency, Bob Woodward was described by Rolling Stone's Ryan Bort as "one of the most revered and well-respected journalists in American history." Woodward and Carl Bernstein's reporting of that scandal earned The Washington Post a Pulitzer Prize and turned them into "the most heralded U.S. investigative journalists ever," according to Nick Allen of The Daily Telegraph. In his books on American presidents such as Bill Clinton, George W. Bush, and Barack Obama, Allen writes that Woodward, with "relentless and methodical reporting," "has harvested a level of detail on the internal workings of various White House administrations that no other writer can match." BBC News' Nick Bryant describes Woodward as "Washington's chronicler in chief", "one of America's most trusted journalists" and "the opposite of sensationalist."

In 2013, during a dispute between Woodward and the Obama administration regarding budget cuts, Donald Trump commented: "Only the Obama [White House] can get away with attacking Bob Woodward."

On July 30, 2018, CNN reported that anonymous sources told them that a well-sourced book on the Trump Administration by Woodward would be published on September 11, 2018. Woodward said that the book's title is based on a quote by Trump in an unrelated 2016 interview: "Real power is, I don't even want to use the word, fear."

According to a September 4, 2018, article in The New York Times, the book is based on "hundreds of hours of interviews with firsthand sources, contemporaneous meeting notes, files, documents and personal diaries." Woodward taped his interviews. Woodward's research assistant was Evelyn Duffy, who also transcribed the recordings.

The editor for the book was Alice Mayhew. Bob Woodward has been working with Alice Mayhew since 1974 when she was the editor for All the President's Men and this was their 19th book together. Mayhew is known for popularizing the Washington Narrative genre of books and Woodward credits Mayhew in the acknowledgments for her "brilliant engagement on the concept for the book, the pace, structure and tone."

== Content ==
The book details the experiences of a number of aides of Trump. According to the book, aides took papers off his desk to prevent him from signing them. White House Chief of Staff John F. Kelly referred to Trump as an "idiot" and "unhinged", while Secretary of Defense James Mattis said Trump has the understanding of "a fifth or sixth grader," and John M. Dowd, formerly Trump's personal lawyer, called him "a fucking liar" telling Trump he would wear an "orange jump suit" if he agreed to testify to Robert Mueller in the Special Counsel investigation.

According to the book, Trump has called Jeff Sessions, his attorney general, "mentally retarded" and described him as a "dumb southerner". Trump has denied ever using "these terms on anyone", although tape recordings from 2004 contradict this assertion.

CNN's editor-at-large Chris Cillizza described Fear telling a similar story compared to mainstream media reporting and other 2018 books – journalist Michael Wolff's Fire and Fury and former Trump aide Omarosa Manigault Newman's Unhinged – that the Trump administration has a "chaotic, dysfunctional, ill-prepared White House" led by Trump, "a man hopelessly out of his depth in the job, but entirely incapable of understanding how desperately out of depth he actually is".

One notable incident reportedly occurred after the Khan Shaykhun chemical attack in April, 2017. According to Woodward, Secretary of Defense Jim Mattis ignored an order from Trump to assassinate Syrian President Bashar al-Assad, with Trump reportedly saying "Let’s fucking kill him! Let’s go in. Let’s kill the fucking lot of them." Trump said in 2018 the idea "was never even contemplated" and that the book was a lie, but in 2020 reversed himself and said that he had been in favor but Mattis had opposed the idea.

== Reception ==
=== White House response ===
In early August 2018, Trump called Woodward about the book after the text had already been finalized. Trump told Woodward: "You know I'm very open to you. I think you've always been fair", as both of them expressed sentiments that they should have had an interview before the book was written. Trump initially claimed that no one had informed him that Woodward wanted to interview him, attributing this to his aides being "afraid" to talk to him or "busy"; but later in the call, Trump acknowledged that Republican Senator Lindsey Graham "did quickly mention" that Woodward wanted to conduct an interview. Woodward informed Trump that the book is "a tough look at the world and your administration and you", but will be "factual" and "accurate". Trump thus concluded that the book will be "negative", "bad" and "very inaccurate", because "accurate is that nobody's ever done a better job than I'm doing as president".

After several news outlets published excerpts of the book in early September, Trump claimed that Fear was "just another bad book", and that Woodward "had a lot of credibility problems ... He wanted to write the book a certain way ... I never spoke to him". Trump separately called the stories in the book "made up" and questioned if Woodward was an "operative" of the Democratic Party due to the "timing" of the book's release.

Sarah Huckabee Sanders responds to questions from the press.

Meanwhile, White House Press Secretary Sarah Huckabee Sanders released a statement saying that the book contained "nothing more than fabricated stories". Additionally, Kelly denied the book's claim that he had referred to Trump as an idiot, while Mattis called the passage featuring him "fiction" and dismissed the idea that he would show contempt or disrespect to a president.

=== Book sales ===
The book sold over 1.1 million copies in its first week of publication, making it the fastest selling opener in Simon & Schuster's history. When it was released, it took the no. 1 spot on The New York Times Best Seller list.

=== Reviews ===
Lloyd Green of The Guardian described Fear as "another sober, must-read dissection of corruption and rot at the White House", a repeat of Woodward's past reporting on President Richard Nixon. Overall, Green branded Fear as telling a "chilling" story which is "big on facts and short on hyperventilation".

Ron Elving of NPR wrote that Fear is so far "the best glimpse we have into a White House like no other", with an account of Trump "and his presidency so devastating that it can only be described as an indictment". However, Elving expected that a portion of Trump supporters "will find this portrayal of Trump so unacceptable as to defy belief, and they may focus their dismay not on Trump but on Woodward." Elving also argues that Woodward's decision to keep his sources anonymous diminishes readers' confidence in the truth of their stories, given "the enormous weight of what Woodward is alleging."

== See also ==
- List of The New York Times number-one books of 2018
- Timeline of investigations into Trump and Russia (2018)
