= Rage (Woodward book) =

2020 book by Bob Woodward

- Author: Bob Woodward
- Subject: First presidency of Donald Trump
- Genre: Nonfiction
- Published: September 15, 2020
- Publisher: Simon & Schuster
- Publication place: United States
- Media type: Print, e-book, audiobook
- Pages: 480
- ISBN: 978-1-9821-3173-9 (Hardcover)
- OCLC: 1153498447
- Followed by: Peril

Rage is a book by the American journalist Bob Woodward about the first presidency of Donald Trump, published in 2020, by Simon & Schuster. The book is largely critical of Trump, focusing on his handling of the COVID-19 pandemic, his strained relationship with military brass and high-level officials such as Jim Mattis and Dan Coats, his handling of racial unrest, and his relationships with the leaders of Russia and North Korea.

As with Woodward's 2018 Fear: Trump in the White House, the title of the book is derived from a conversation that Woodward had with Trump in March 2016. Woodward contended that "a lot of angst and rage and distress" was present in the Republican Party, to which Trump replied "I bring rage out. I do bring rage out. I always have... I don't know if that's an asset or a liability, but whatever it is, I do. I also bring great unity out, ultimately. I've had many occasions like this, where people have hated me more than any human being they've ever met. And after it's all over, they end up being my friends. And I see that happening here."

== Background ==
Trump had told Woodward that he wished that he had been able to speak to him for the book's 2018 predecessor, Fear. White House officials told Politico that Trump's respect for Woodward was rooted in his "1980s cultural mindset", which prioritized Time magazine covers and The New York Times, and made him respect Woodward as "an institution" as a result of his work in exposing the Watergate scandal, which led to the resignation of Richard Nixon. Anthony Scaramucci, the former White House communications director, said that Woodward was the "gold standard for fifty years of investigative journalism around the presidency", and that Trump was attracted to the New York Times the way "a low-IQ small moth would be to a flame", and Trump is "always convinced that if he talks to the person, he is going to elucidate and enlighten that person, and get them to like him".

Trump urged members of his administration to provide interviews to Woodward for Rage, and participants included senior adviser Jared Kushner, his former chief of staff Mick Mulvaney, the national security adviser Robert C. O'Brien, and the deputy national security adviser Matthew Pottinger. The White House press secretary Kayleigh McEnany said that Trump gave access to Woodward because he was "the most transparent president in history". Simon & Schuster stated that the book is the result of "hundreds of hours of interviews with firsthand witnesses, as well as participants' notes, emails, diaries, calendars and confidential documents".

Trump gave 18 digital-tape-recorded interviews to Woodward for his book, lasting nine hours. The interviews took place in the Oval Office, and also at night on the telephone. Trump reportedly asked his aides repeatedly about when the book would be published. He later denounced the book, describing it as "another political hit job".

== Content ==
The book opens with a depiction of the United States' tensions with North Korea, including describing a series of personal letters between Trump and North Korean leader Kim Jong Un. In these letters, Kim describes his initial meeting with Trump in romantic, flowery language, calling the meeting "reminiscent of a scene from a fantasy film". This de-escalation of tensions came immediately following panic about the potential of nuclear war between the two powers. Woodward focuses on the tensions with world leaders as the focus of his book, including Trump's impeachment and his alleged collusion with Russian authorities, while also focusing on the impact of the COVID-19 pandemic on the administration; during an interview with Trump, he said that the pandemic "will be the biggest national security threat you [Trump] face in your presidency".

Trump told Woodward that he "wanted to always play it down" regarding the threat to the public health of Americans presented by COVID-19 despite being told that it may be five times "more deadly" than the common flu. Trump added: "I still like playing it down, because I don't want to create a panic." Rage concludes with Woodward's assessment of Trump as "the wrong man for the job."

== Reception ==
Nancy Cook and Alex Thompson wrote in Politico that Trump "[believed] he could charm the man who helped take down a president and chronicled half a dozen administrations over the past half-century" but that the revelations in the book "sent the Trump White House scrambling, with aides blaming one another for the predictable fallout from injecting even more chaos into an already challenging reelection race."

Woodward was criticized for not revealing Trump's thoughts on the COVID-19 pandemic in the United States prior to the imminent release of the book. Woodward said in an interview that the book would have been able to provide more context than a news story and that "the biggest problem I had, which is always a problem with Trump, is I didn't know if it was true" and that if he "had done the story at that time about what he knew in February, that's not telling us anything we didn't know."
