= Bob Woodward =

American investigative journalist (born 1943)

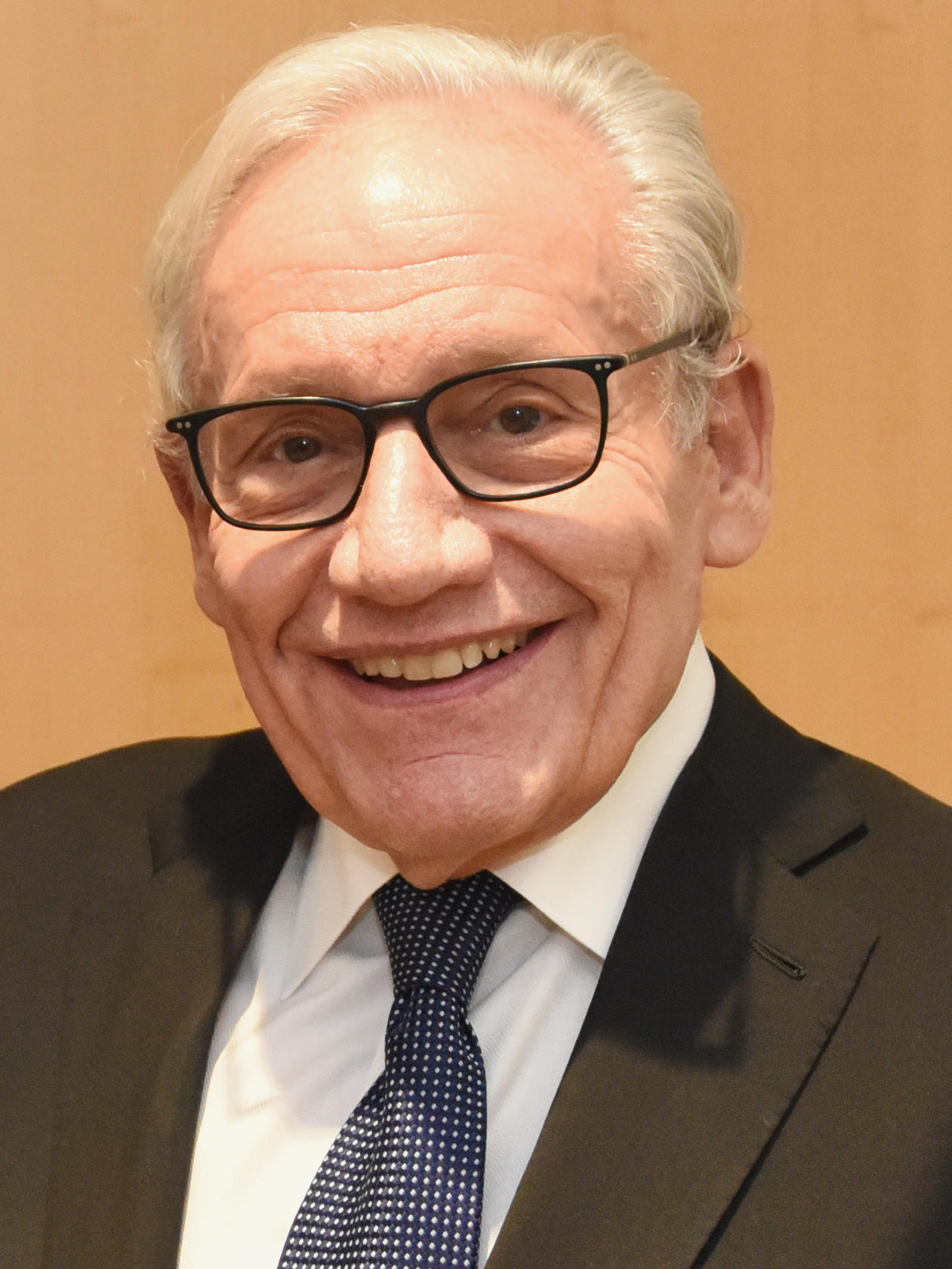
- Woodward in 2023
- Born: Robert Upshur Woodward; March 26, 1943 (age 83); Geneva, Illinois, U.S.
- Education: Yale University (BA)
- Occupation: Journalist
- Known for: Reporting on the Watergate scandal
- Notable credit: The Washington Post
- Spouses: Kathleen Middlekauff (m. 1966; div. 1969) Frances Kuper (m. 1974; div. 1979) Elsa Walsh (m. 1989)
- Children: 2
- Father: Alfred E. Woodward
- Military career
- Allegiance: United States
- Branch: United States Navy
- Service years: 1965–1970
- Rank: Lieutenant
- Units: USS Wright (CVL-49); USS Fox (CG-33)
- Website: bobwoodward.com

Robert Upshur Woodward (born March 26, 1943) is an American investigative journalist. He started working for The Washington Post as a reporter in 1971 and now holds the honorific title of associate editor there, though the Post no longer employs him.

While a reporter for The Washington Post in 1972, Woodward teamed up with Carl Bernstein, and the two did much of the original news reporting on the Watergate scandal. These scandals led to numerous government investigations and the eventual resignation of President Richard Nixon. The work of Woodward and Bernstein was called "maybe the single greatest reporting effort of all time" by longtime journalist and former editor of The New York Times Gene Roberts.

Woodward continued to work for The Washington Post after his reporting on Watergate. Since 1974, he has written 24 books on American politics and current affairs, 14 of which have topped best-seller lists.

== Early life, education and naval service ==
Woodward was born in Geneva, Illinois, the son of Jane (née Upshur) and Alfred E. Woodward, a lawyer who later became chief judge of the 18th Judicial Circuit Court. He was raised in nearby Wheaton, Illinois, and educated at Wheaton Community High School (WCHS), a public high school in the same town. His parents divorced when he was twelve, and he and his brother and sister were raised by their father, who subsequently remarried.

Following graduation from WCHS in 1961, Woodward enrolled in Yale University with a Naval Reserve Officers Training Corps (NROTC) scholarship and studied history and English literature. While at Yale, Woodward joined the Phi Gamma Delta fraternity and was a member of the Book and Snake secret society. He received his Bachelor of Arts degree in 1965.

=== Naval service ===
After Yale, Woodward began a five-year tour of duty in the United States Navy, working as a communications officer. Woodward has sometimes been cited as working in intelligence, but Woodward denies this. During his service in the Navy, Woodward served aboard the USS Wright, and was one of two officers assigned to move or handle nuclear launch codes the Wright carried in its capacity as a National Emergency Command Post Afloat (NECPA). At one time, he was close to Admiral Robert O. Welander, being communications officer on the USS Fox under Welander's command.

== Career ==
=== Early career ===
After being discharged as a lieutenant in August 1970, Woodward was admitted to Harvard Law School but elected not to attend. Instead, he applied for a job as a reporter for The Washington Post while taking graduate courses in Shakespeare and international relations at George Washington University. Harry M. Rosenfeld, the Post's metropolitan editor, gave him a two-week trial, but did not hire him because of his lack of journalistic experience. After a year at the Montgomery Sentinel, a weekly newspaper in the Washington, D.C., suburbs, Woodward was hired as a Post reporter in 1971.

=== Watergate ===
Woodward and Carl Bernstein were both assigned to report on the June 17, 1972, burglary of the headquarters of the Democratic National Committee in a Washington, D.C., office building called Watergate. Their work, under editor Ben Bradlee, became known for being the first to report on a number of political "dirty tricks" used by the Nixon re-election committee during his campaign for re-election. Their book about the scandal, All the President's Men, became a No. 1 bestseller and was later turned into a movie. The 1976 film, starring Robert Redford as Woodward and Dustin Hoffman as Bernstein, transformed the reporters into celebrities and inspired a wave of interest in investigative journalism.

The book and movie also led to the enduring mystery of the identity of Woodward's secret Watergate informant known as Deep Throat, a reference to the title of a popular pornographic movie at the time. Woodward said he would protect Deep Throat's identity until the man died or allowed his name to be revealed. For more than 30 years, only Woodward, Bernstein, and a handful of others knew the informant's identity until it was claimed by his family to Vanity Fair magazine to be former Federal Bureau of Investigation Associate Director W. Mark Felt in May 2005. Woodward immediately confirmed the veracity of this claim and subsequently published a book, titled The Secret Man, that detailed his relationship with Felt.

Woodward and Bernstein followed up All the President's Men with a second book on Watergate, entitled The Final Days (published in 1976), covering in extensive depth the period from November 1973 until President Nixon resigned in August 1974.

The Woodward and Bernstein Watergate Papers are housed at the Harry Ransom Center at the University of Texas at Austin.

=== "Jimmy's World" scandal ===
In September 1980, a Sunday feature story appeared on the front page of the Post titled "Jimmy's World" in which reporter Janet Cooke wrote a profile of the life of an eight-year-old heroin addict. Although some within the Post doubted the story's veracity, it was defended by the paper's editors including Woodward, who was assistant managing editor. It was Woodward who submitted the story for Pulitzer Prize consideration, and Cooke was awarded the Pulitzer Prize for Feature Writing on April 13, 1981. The story was then found to be a complete fabrication, and the Pulitzer was returned. In retrospect, Woodward made the following statement:

I was blown away by the story. . . . I think that the decision to nominate the story for a Pulitzer is of minimal consequence. I also think that it won is of little consequence. It is a brilliant story—fake and fraud that it is. It would be absurd for me or any other editor to review the authenticity or accuracy of stories that are nominated for prizes.

=== 1996 campaign finance controversy ===
China's alleged role in the 1996 United States campaign finance controversy first gained public attention when Woodward and Brian Duffy published a story stating that a United States Department of Justice investigation into the fund-raising activities had uncovered evidence that Chinese agents sought to direct contributions from foreign sources to the Democratic National Committee (DNC) before the 1996 presidential campaign. The journalists wrote that intelligence information had shown the Chinese embassy in Washington, D.C. was used for coordinating contributions to the DNC.

=== George W. Bush administration ===
Woodward spent more time than any other journalist with former President George W. Bush, interviewing him six times for close to 11 hours total. Woodward's four books, Bush at War (2002), Plan of Attack (2004), State of Denial (2006), and The War Within: A Secret White House History (2006–2008) (2008) are detailed accounts of the Bush presidency, including the response to the September 11 attacks and the wars in Afghanistan and Iraq. In a series of articles published in January 2002, he and Dan Balz described the events at Camp David in the aftermath of September 11 and discussed the Worldwide Attack Matrix.

Woodward believed the Bush administration's claims of Iraqi weapons of mass destruction prior to the war. During an appearance on Larry King Live, he was asked by a telephone caller, "Suppose we go to war and go into Iraq and there are no weapons of mass destruction", Woodward responded "I think the chance of that happening is about zero. There's just too much there." Woodward later admitted his error saying, "I think I dropped the ball here. I should have pushed much, much harder on the skepticism about the reality of WMD; in other words, [I should have] said, 'Hey, look, the evidence is not as strong as they were claiming.'"

==== Involvement in the Plame scandal ====
On November 14, 2005, Woodward gave a two-hour deposition to Special Counsel Patrick Fitzgerald. He testified that a senior administration official had told him in June 2003 that Iraq war critic Joe Wilson's wife (later identified as Valerie Plame) worked for the CIA as a WMD analyst, not as an undercover operative. Woodward appears to have been the first reporter to learn about her employment (albeit not her name) from a government source. The deposition was reported in The Washington Post on November 16, 2005, and was the first time Woodward revealed publicly that he had any special knowledge about the case. Woodward testified the information was given to him in a "casual" and "offhand" manner, and said that he does not believe it was part of any coordinated effort to "out" Plame as a CIA employee. Later, Woodward's source identified himself. It was Richard Armitage, Colin Powell's deputy and an internal critic of the Iraq War and the White House inner circle.

Woodward said the revelation came at the end of a long, confidential background interview for his 2004 book Plan of Attack. He did not reveal the official's disclosure at the time because it did not strike him as important. Later, he kept it to himself because it came as part of a confidential conversation with a source.

In his deposition, Woodward also said that he had conversations with Scooter Libby after the June 2003 conversation with his confidential administration source, and testified that it is possible that he might have asked Libby further questions about Joe Wilson's wife before her employment at the CIA and her identity were publicly known.

Woodward apologized to Leonard Downie Jr., editor of The Washington Post, for not informing him earlier of the June 2003 conversation. Downie accepted the apology and said even had the paper known it would not have changed its reporting.

New York University professor Jay Rosen severely criticized Woodward for allegedly being co-opted by the Bush White House and also for not telling the truth about his role in the Plame affair, writing: "Not only is Woodward not in the hunt, but he is slowly turning into the hunted. Part of what remains to be uncovered is how Woodward was played by the Bush team, and what they thought they were doing by leaking to him, as well as what he did with the dubious information he got."

=== Sequester dispute with Obama administration ===
On February 22, 2013, shortly before the United States federal budget sequester took effect, The Washington Post published a column by Woodward in which he criticized the Obama administration for their statements in 2012 and 2013 that the sequester had been proposed by Republicans in Congress; Woodward said his research showed that the sequester proposal had originated with the White House. Press Secretary Jay Carney confirmed, "The sequester was something that was discussed, and as has been reported, it was an idea that the White House put forward."

On February 27, Woodward told Politico that before the column was published, Woodward had called a senior White House official, later identified by reporters as economic adviser Gene Sperling, to discuss the piece, and that the official had "yelled at [Woodward] for about a half-hour" before sending him a page-long email that included the sentence, "I think you will regret staking out that claim." In Politico's reporting, Woodward's focus on that line was described as "making clear he saw [that sentence] as a veiled threat", although Woodward did not use the word "threat" or "threatened". Several other sources also indicated that Woodward had described the line as an intended threat.

The next day, Politico published the complete email exchange between Woodward and Sperling. Sperling's statements leading up to the "regret" line read: "But I do truly believe you should rethink your comment about saying that Potus asking for revenues is moving the goal post. I know you may not believe this, but as a friend, I think you will regret staking out that claim." The White House subsequently released a statement that "of course no threat was intended...The note suggested that Mr. Woodward would regret the observation he made regarding the sequester because that observation was inaccurate, nothing more." Upon release of the emails, several conservative commentators indicated they no longer agreed with characterizing the "regret" statement as a threat.

In a February 28 Fox News Channel interview, Woodward said he had never used the word "threat" but said Sperling's conduct was "not the way to operate in a White House". He also said: "I've been flooded with emails from people in the press saying this is exactly the way the White House works, they are trying to control and they don't want to be challenged or crossed". National Journal editor Ron Fournier, conservative Washington Post columnist Jennifer Rubin, and Fox News contributor and former Clinton adviser Lanny Davis expressed support for Woodward; Fournier and Davis described similar experiences with Obama administration officials.

=== Joe Biden allegation ===
In January 2025, The Guardian reported that in Congressman's James Comer's then upcoming book, All the President's Money, Comer alleges that Woodward confided to him at a private dinner in February 2023 "that everyone in DC knew that Joe [Biden] allowed his family to sell access to him, but as far as he was aware, that was not illegal." Woodward denied the allegation.

=== Other professional activities ===
Although Woodward is no longer employed by the Post, Woodward has continued to report stories for the paper and has the title of associate editor, which was described by Post media columnist Margaret Sullivan as honorific with no regular responsibilities. He focuses on the presidency, intelligence, and Washington institutions such as the U.S. Supreme Court, the Pentagon, and the Federal Reserve.

In his 2026 memoir Secrets, Woodward revealed a large number of confidential sources he became acquainted with and utilized over his years of reporting, many of which had not been reported previously. Included among those revealed were Brent Scowcroft, Lawrence Eagleburger, Fred Buzhardt, Leonard Garment, Stanley Sporkin, Samuel Dash, C. Boyden Gray, and Richard Darman.

== Career recognition and awards ==
Although not a recipient in his own right, Woodward made contributions to two Pulitzer Prizes won by The Washington Post. In 1973, the Post won the Pulitzer Prize for Public Service for its Watergate investigation, for which Woodward and Bernstein were the lead reporters. Woodward was also the main reporter for the Post's coverage of the September 11 attacks. The Post won the 2002 Pulitzer Prize for National Reporting for 10 of its stories on the subject.

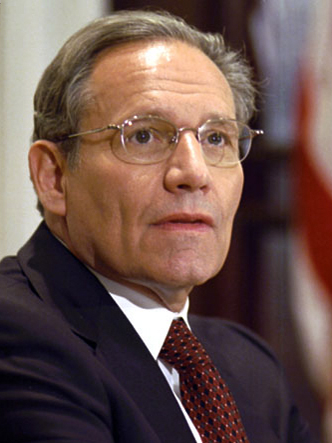
Woodward at the National Press Club in 2002

Woodward himself has been a recipient of nearly every major American journalism award, including the Heywood Broun award (1972), Worth Bingham Prize for Investigative Reporting (1972 and 1986), Sigma Delta Chi Award (1973), George Polk Award (1972), William Allen White Medal (2000), and the Gerald R. Ford Prize for Reporting on the Presidency (2002). In 2012, Colby College presented Woodward with the Elijah Parish Lovejoy Award for courageous journalism as well as an honorary doctorate.

Woodward has authored or co-authored 24 nonfiction books in the past 42 years. All of them have been national bestsellers and 14 of them have been No. 1 national nonfiction bestsellers, the most of any contemporary author for this genre.

In his 1995 memoir, A Good Life, former Post Executive Editor Ben Bradlee singled out Woodward in the foreword. "It would be hard to overestimate the contributions to my newspaper and to my time as editor of that extraordinary reporter, Bob Woodward—surely the best of his generation at investigative reporting, the best I've ever seen.... And Woodward has maintained the same position on top of journalism's ladder ever since Watergate." In 1995, Woodward also received the Golden Plate Award of the American Academy of Achievement.

David Gergen, who had worked in the White House during the Richard Nixon and three subsequent administrations, said in his 2000 memoir, Eyewitness to Power, of Woodward's reporting, "I don't accept everything he writes as gospel—he can get details wrong—but generally, his accounts in both his books and in the Post are remarkably reliable and demand serious attention. I am convinced he writes only what he believes to be true or has been reliably told to be true. And he is certainly a force for keeping the government honest."

In 2001, Woodward won the Walter Cronkite Award for Excellence in Journalism.

Fred Barnes of the Weekly Standard called Woodward "the best pure reporter of his generation, perhaps ever." In 2003, Al Hunt of The Wall Street Journal called Woodward "the most celebrated journalist of our age." In 2004, Bob Schieffer of CBS News said, "Woodward has established himself as the best reporter of our time. He may be the best reporter of all time."

In 2014, Robert Gates, the former director of the CIA and Secretary of Defense, said that he wished he'd recruited Woodward into the CIA, saying, "He has an extraordinary ability to get otherwise responsible adults to spill [their] guts to him...his ability to get people to talk about stuff they shouldn't be talking about is just extraordinary and may be unique."

== Reception ==
Journalist Nicholas von Hoffman has made the criticism that "arrestingly irrelevant detail is [often] used", while Michael Massing believes Woodward's books are "filled with long, at times tedious passages with no evident direction."

Joan Didion published a comprehensive criticism of Woodward in a lengthy September 1996 essay in The New York Review of Books. Though "Woodward is a widely trusted reporter, even an American icon", she says that he assembles reams of often irrelevant detail, fails to draw conclusions, and make judgments. "Measurable cerebral activity is virtually absent" from his books after Watergate from 1979 to 1996, she said. She said the books are notable for "a scrupulous passivity, an agreement to cover the story not as it is occurring but as it is presented, which is to say as it is manufactured." She ridicules "fairness" as "a familiar newsroom piety, the excuse in practice for a good deal of autopilot reporting and lazy thinking." All this focus on what people said and thought—their "decent intentions"—circumscribes "possible discussion or speculation", resulting in what she called "political pornography".

The Post's Richard Harwood defended Woodward in a September 6, 1996, column, arguing that Woodward's method is that of a reporter—"talking to people you write about, checking and cross-checking their versions of contemporary history," and collecting documentary evidence in notes, letters, and records."

Woodward has been accused of exaggeration and fabrication regarding Deep Throat. After Mark Felt was announced as the true identity behind Deep Throat in 2005, John Dean and Ed Gray, in separate publications, used Woodward's book All The President's Men and his published notes on his meetings with Deep Throat to argue that Deep Throat could not have been only Mark Felt. They argued that Deep Throat was a fictional composite made up of several Woodward sources, only one of whom was Felt. Gray, in his book In Nixon's Web, even went so far as to publish an e-mail and telephone exchange he had with Donald Santarelli, a Washington lawyer who was a Justice Department official during Watergate, in which Santarelli confirmed to Gray that he was the source behind statements Woodward recorded in notes he has attributed to Deep Throat. However, Stephen Mielke, an archivist at the University of Texas who oversees the Woodward-Bernstein papers, said it is likely the page was misfiled under Felt because no source was identified. The original page of notes is in the Mark Felt file but "the carbon is located with the handwritten and typed notes attributed to Santarelli." Ed Gray said that Santarelli confirmed to him that he was the source behind the statements in the notes.

J. Bradford DeLong has noted considerable inconsistencies between the accounts of the making of Clinton economic policy described in Woodward's book Maestro and his book The Agenda.

Some of Woodward's critics accuse him of abandoning critical inquiry to maintain his access to high-profile political actors. Anthony Lewis called the style "a trade in which the great grant access in return for glory." Christopher Hitchens accused Woodward of acting as "stenographer to the rich and powerful."

Writer Tanner Colby, who co-wrote a biography of John Belushi with the late actor's widow Judy, wrote in Slate that, while Woodward's frequently criticized 1984 book Wired: The Short Life and Fast Times of John Belushi is largely accurate in its description of events, Woodward either gets the context wrong or does not find any context at all. For example, Belushi's grandmother's funeral, which led him to make a serious effort to sober up, gets merely a paragraph in Woodward's retelling, while a 24-hour drug binge in Los Angeles goes on for eight pages simply because the limo driver was willing to talk to Woodward. "It's like someone wrote a biography of Michael Jordan in which all the stats and scores are correct, but you come away with the impression that Michael Jordan wasn't very good at playing basketball," he concluded. Because it was unique among Woodward's books in that it made no use of confidential or anonymous sources, Colby was able to interview many of the same sources that Woodward had used, making comparisons of their recollection of events to Woodward's accounting of them relatively easy.

Woodward believed the Bush administration's claims of Iraqi weapons of mass destruction before the war, and the publication of the book At the Center of the Storm: My Years at the CIA by former Director of Central Intelligence George Tenet led Woodward to write an account of the extent of his pre-war conversations with Tenet in an article in The New Yorker in which he also chastised New York Times op-ed columnist Maureen Dowd for being critical of him.

Woodward was also accused of fabricating a deathbed interview with CIA Director William Casey, as described in Veil, where Casey supposedly admitted to his knowledge of the Iran-Contra affair. Casey's widow and several individuals from the agency stated that Casey was incapable of speaking at the time of the alleged interview. However, Robert Gates, Casey's deputy at the time, in his book From the Shadows, recounts speaking with Casey during this exact period. Gates directly quotes Casey saying 22 words, even more than the 19 words Woodward said Casey used with him. The CIA's internal report found that Casey "had forty-three meetings or phone calls with Woodward, including a number of meetings at Casey's home with no one else present" during the period Woodward was researching his book. Gates was also quoted saying, "When I saw him in the hospital, his speech was even more slurred than usual, but if you knew him well, you could make out a few words, enough to get sense of what he was saying." Following Casey's death, President Ronald Reagan wrote: "[Woodward]'s a liar and he lied about what Casey is supposed to have thought of me." Woodward revealed in his 2026 memoir Secrets that he was able to meet Casey in his hospital bed because many members of Casey's protective detail were already confidential sources he had previously cultivated; upon seeing Woodward at the hospital where Casey was staying, one of them said "Hi Bob", and let Woodward in to speak to Casey.

Woodward has also been widely criticized for having withheld interviews with President Donald Trump in which Trump revealed that COVID-19 was a much greater threat than he had publicly claimed. These interviews were conducted in February 2020, but were not released until September 2020 during the promotion of Rage, Woodward's book about the Trump presidency.

On January 30, 2023, Trump sued, saying he had not given Woodward permission to release the audio recorded for The Trump Tapes. Woodward and Simon & Schuster issued a statement the next day saying the lawsuit was "without merit".

== Lecturing ==
Woodward has taken part in giving speeches on the "lecture circuit" to industry lobbying groups, such as the American Bankruptcy Institute, the National Association of Chain Drug Stores, and the Mortgage Bankers Association. Woodward was commanding speaking fees "rang[ing] from $15,000 to $60,000" and donating them to his personal foundation, the Woodward Walsh Foundation, which donated to charities including Sidwell Friends School. Washington Post policy prohibits "speaking engagements without permission from department heads", but Woodward insisted that the policy is "fuzzy and ambiguous".

Woodward also lectures at colleges and universities. He gave the 2001 Robert C. Vance Distinguished Lecture at Central Connecticut State University, and has spoken at the University of Arkansas, University of Alabama, Eastern Connecticut State University, West Texas A&M University, and Oklahoma City Community College. Following the publication in 2018 of Fear: Trump in the White House, he spoke to an overflow crowd of students, faculty, and guests at Virginia Commonwealth University. His May 4, 2019, speech at Kent State University contained the startling revelation of previously unreleased audiotape on which then-president Richard Nixon can be heard lauding the 1970 shooting of four students for its effect on those who disagreed with him.

== Personal life ==
Woodward has been married three times. His first marriage (1966–1969) was to his high school sweetheart Kathleen Middlekauff, now an English professor. His second marriage (1974–1979) was to Frances Kuper. In 1989, he married for a third time to Elsa Walsh (b. August 25, 1957), a writer for The New Yorker and the author of Divided Lives: The Public and Private Struggles of Three American Women.

His oldest daughter, Tali, is also a journalist. She directed a graduate program in journalism at Columbia University for six years before becoming an editor for The Trace.

== In popular culture ==
Woodward was portrayed by Robert Redford in All the President's Men (1976), J. T. Walsh in Wired (1989), Will Ferrell in Dick (1999), Julian Morris in Mark Felt: The Man Who Brought Down the White House (2017), and Spencer Garrett in The Front Runner (2018). Redford's voice from All the President's Men, depicting Woodward's telephone call to Howard Hunt, was reused in episode 4 of the 2023 HBO miniseries, White House Plumbers, in depicting the call from Hunt's perspective. Woodward was also referenced as the author of a fictional investigative book titled "The Truth About Whacking Day" in the episode "Whacking Day" of The Simpsons.

== Books ==
- All the President's Men (1974) ISBN 0-671-21781-X; 25th anniversary issue (1999) ISBN 0-684-86355-3; written with Carl Bernstein
- The Final Days (1976) ISBN 0-671-22298-8; written with Carl Bernstein
- The Brethren: Inside the Supreme Court (1979) ISBN 0-671-24110-9; written with Scott Armstrong
- Wired (1984) ISBN 0-671-47320-4
- Veil: The Secret Wars of the CIA (1987); ISBN 0-671-60117-2
- The Commanders (1991) ISBN 0-671-41367-8
- The Agenda (1994) ISBN 0-7432-7407-5
- The Choice (1996) ISBN 0-684-81308-4
- Shadow (1999) ISBN 0-684-85262-4
- Maestro (2000) ISBN 0-7432-0412-3
- Bush at War (2002) ISBN 0-7432-0473-5
- Plan of Attack (2004) ISBN 0-7432-5547-X
- The Secret Man: The Story of Watergate's Deep Throat (2005) ISBN 0-7432-8715-0
- State of Denial: Bush at War, Part III (2006) ISBN 0-7432-7223-4
- The War Within: A Secret White House History (2006–2008) (2008) ISBN 1-4165-5897-7
- Obama's Wars (2010) ISBN 978-1439172490
- The Price of Politics (2012) ISBN 978-1451651119
- The Last of the President's Men (2015) ISBN 978-1501116445
- Fear: Trump in the White House (2018) ISBN 978-1471181306
- Rage (2020) ISBN 978-1982131739
- Peril (2021) ISBN 978-1982182915; written with Robert Costa
- The Trump Tapes: Bob Woodward's Twenty Interviews with President Donald Trump (2023) ISBN 978-1668028148
- War (2024) ISBN 978-1668052273
- Secrets: A Reporter's Memoir (2026) ISBN 978-1668008232

== Television ==
Woodward co-wrote the 1986 NBC made-for-TV film Under Siege about a series of terrorist attacks in the United States. The film's other co-writers include Christian Williams, Richard Harwood, and Alfred Sole.

Woodward again collaborated with Williams when they were story writers for the 1989 TNT TV miniseries adaptation of The Nightmare Years about American journalist William L. Shirer stationed in pre-World War II Nazi Germany. The miniseries' screenplay was written by Ian Curteis.
