= Hallie Jackson =

American television journalist (born 1984)

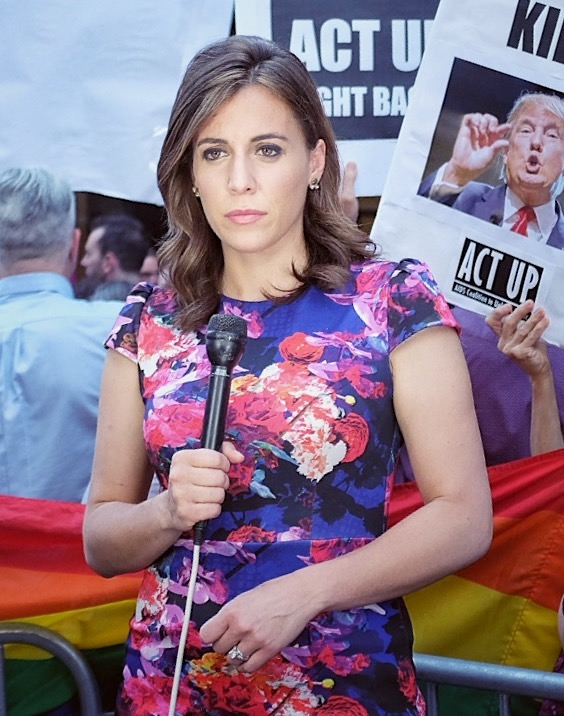
- Jackson reporting during an anti-Donald Trump protest in 2016
- Born: Hallie Marie Jackson; April 29, 1984 (age 42); Yardley, Pennsylvania, U.S.
- Education: Johns Hopkins University (BA)
- Employer: NBC News
- Television: NBC Nightly News; Hallie Jackson NOW
- Spouse: Doug Hitchner (m. 2011, divorced)
- Partner: Frank Thorp
- Children: 1
- Honors: Phi Beta Kappa

Hallie Marie Jackson (born April 29, 1984) is an American reporter and network anchor. She is the senior Washington correspondent for NBC News, an anchor for NBC News Now, and the anchor of the Sunday edition of NBC Nightly News. She is also a substitute anchor for Today, Saturday Today, Sunday Today with Willie Geist, and NBC Nightly News. She worked in Salisbury, Maryland; Dover, Delaware; Hartford, Connecticut; New Haven, Connecticut; and Baltimore, Maryland, before joining NBC News in 2014.

== Early life and education ==
Jackson was born on April 29, 1984, in Yardley, Pennsylvania, the daughter of David and Heidi Jackson. In 2002, she graduated from Pennsbury High School. In 2006, Jackson graduated Phi Beta Kappa from Johns Hopkins University with a B.A. degree in political science. As an undergraduate at JHU, she joined Phi Mu sorority.

== Career ==
Jackson started her journalism career at WBOC-TV, in Salisbury, Maryland and Dover, Delaware in 2006 until her departure for WFSB, in Hartford and New Haven, Connecticut, during 2008. Her career led to Hearst Corporation in 2012, where she reported for their 26 stations from Washington, D.C. In 2014, Jackson became a reporter and journalist for NBC News, for which she covered the Ted Cruz presidential campaign for the network as their embedded reporter. In summer 2016, Jackson began anchoring the 1 p.m. ET edition of MSNBC Live, NBC News' daytime coverage platform. In January 2017, NBC named Jackson as its chief White House correspondent, while also stating that she would transition time slots and anchor MSNBC's 10:00 a.m. hour. On September 20, 2021, Jackson moved to the 3 p.m. hour of MSNBC Live. On November 17, 2021, Jackson began hosting Hallie Jackson NOW on NBC News' streaming channel, NBC News NOW, which streams Mondays through Fridays at 5 p.m. ET. In January 2023, it was announced that Jackson would depart her MSNBC show as part of an expansion of her streaming show to two hours, which began in March 2023. Her former 3 p.m. hour on MSNBC was taken over by Katy Tur. In March 2024, NBC News announced that Jackson would replace Kate Snow as anchor of the Sunday edition of NBC Nightly News, while continuing to host her streaming show on Mondays to Thursdays, with Tom Costello hosting on Fridays.

== Honors and awards ==
On May 27, 2020, Jackson was invited to and gave special remarks at her alma mater Johns Hopkins University's 2020 commencement ceremony. Other guest speakers during the virtual ceremony included Reddit co-founder and commencement speaker Alexis Ohanian; philanthropist and former New York City Mayor Michael Bloomberg; Anthony Fauci, director of the National Institute of Allergy and Infectious Diseases; and a leading member of the White House Coronavirus Task Force and senior class president, Pavan Patel.

== Personal life ==
Jackson and her partner, Frank Thorp, a producer and off-air reporter for NBC News, announced the birth of their first child, a daughter, on March 9, 2020.
