= Robert Costa (journalist) =

American investigative journalist

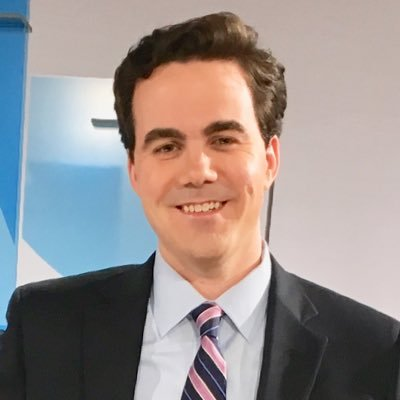
- Born: October 14, 1985 (age 40); Richmond, Virginia, U.S.
- Education: University of Notre Dame (BA); University of Cambridge (MPhil)
- Occupation: Journalist
- Employer: CBS News
- Parent(s): Thomas Eugene Costa; Anne-Dillon Marie Dalton Costa

Robert Costa (born October 14, 1985) is an American journalist who is a national correspondent for CBS Sunday Morning and the chief Washington analyst for CBS News. Prior to joining CBS in 2022, Costa was a longtime national political reporter for The Washington Post. Previously, he was a political analyst for NBC News and MSNBC and the moderator and managing editor of Washington Week on PBS. He is the co-author with Bob Woodward of Peril, a #1 New York Times bestseller on the final days of the first Trump presidency, including the 2021 United States Capitol attack.

== Education and early life ==
Costa was born October 14, 1985, in Richmond, Virginia, the son of attorneys Anne-Dillon (née Dalton) and Thomas E. Costa. His father worked as an attorney for pharmaceutical company Bristol-Myers Squibb. He has three siblings. He is of partial Italian descent.

He grew up in Lower Makefield Township, Bucks County, Pennsylvania, where he attended Pennsbury High School and graduated in 2004. While Costa was at Pennsbury, Sports Illustrated writer Michael Bamberger profiled him in the book Wonderland: A Year in the Life of an American High School. He was also friends with actor Zach Woods and journalist Hallie Jackson, two fellow Pennsbury students.

Costa gained notice during high school for bringing rock musicians such as John Mayer, Eve 6, and Maroon 5 to perform at the school. He also reported for The Bucks County Courier Times, interviewing bands and reviewing concerts in the Philadelphia area, and covered professional and local sports for PHS-TV, the student television station.

He earned a bachelor's degree in American studies from the University of Notre Dame in 2008 and a master's degree in politics from the University of Cambridge in 2009. During his time at Notre Dame, Costa held internships at PBS' Charlie Rose, ABC's This Week with George Stephanopoulos, and in the House of Commons of the United Kingdom. On campus, he hosted and produced an interview program for ND-TV called Office Hours.

At Cambridge, Costa was an active member of the Cambridge Union debating society and focused his research on Winston Churchill and United Kingdom–United States relations. His adviser was Andrew Gamble, a British academic and author.

Costa was on the board of trustees at Notre Dame from 2014 to 2017.

== Career ==
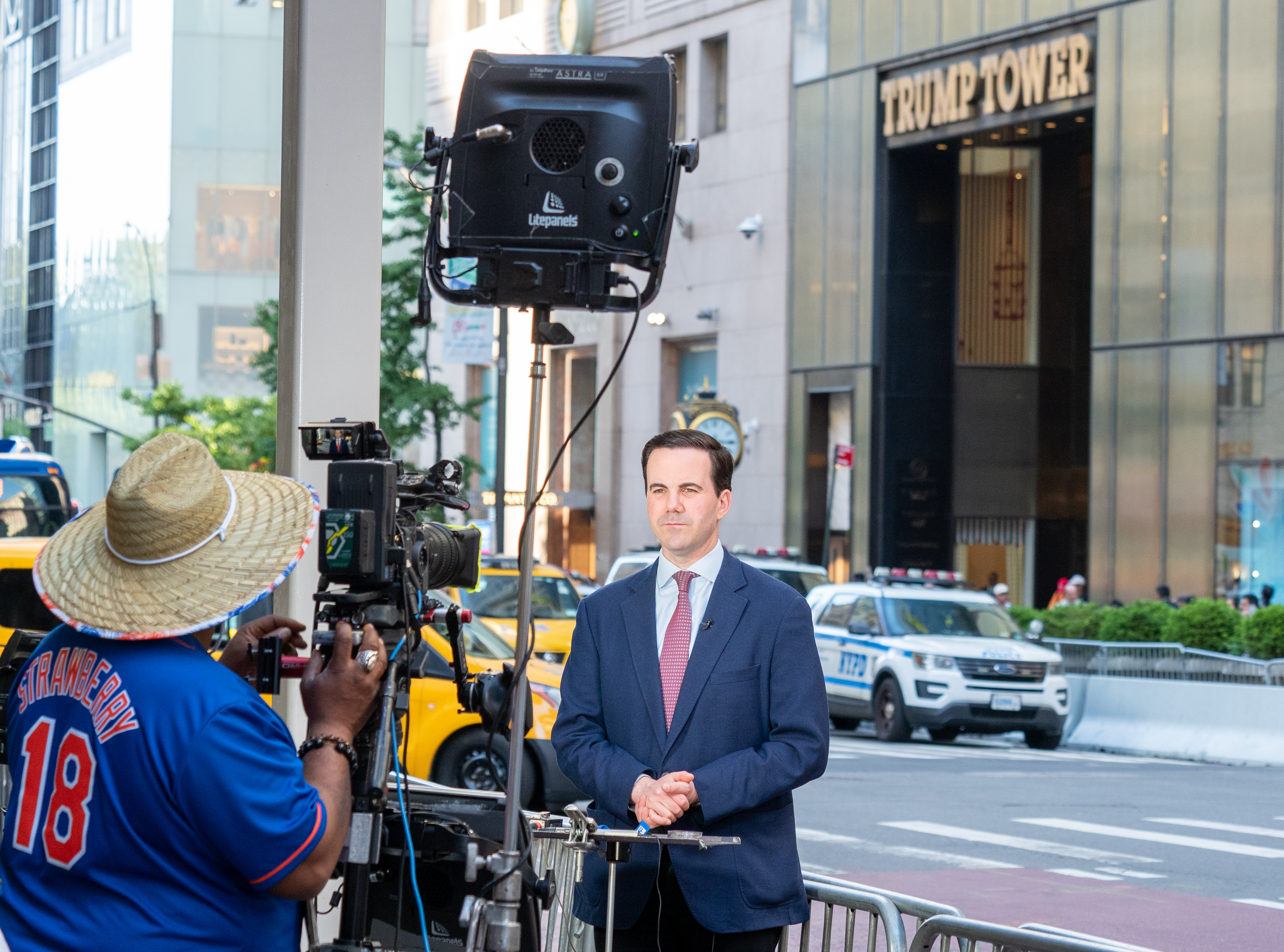
Costa reporting outside Trump Tower during the trial of Donald Trump in May 2024

Costa was a Robert L. Bartley Fellow at The Wall Street Journal. In 2010, he was hired as a reporter by the conservative magazine National Review. In December 2012, he was promoted to the position of Washington editor for National Review. While at National Review, Costa was a contributor for CNBC, appearing on The Kudlow Report, and for MSNBC.

In 2013, during the United States federal government shutdown, Costa's reporting on the Republican Party in Congress was widely praised. The New Republic called him "the most important reporter in the country over the past few weeks" and Slate writer David Weigel called him "omnipresent." New York magazine called him "the golden boy of the government shutdown."

Costa has not identified his political views publicly, saying only that he's not on the "conservative team." He has cited Jim Lehrer, Gwen Ifill, Robert Caro and Tim Russert as influences.

In November 2013, he left National Review for The Washington Post, joining the paper officially in January 2014.

On December 10, 2015, Costa was named a political analyst for both NBC and MSNBC. Costa is known for his deep sourcing within national political circles. He has interviewed President Donald Trump on multiple occasions. Politico has called him the "Trump whisperer."

In March 2016, Costa interviewed Trump with Bob Woodward, who has been a mentor to him. Costa served as guest host of PBS' Charlie Rose in March 2017.

In April 2017, Costa became the moderator of the long-running Washington Week news magazine program on PBS, following the death of moderator Gwen Ifill. Costa frequently hosted top mainstream news reporters on the program. "I've always worked to be highly disciplined in my reporting. ... to be sensitive to constant objectivity," Costa told the Associated Press in 2017.

On January 1, 2021, Costa hosted his last episode of the Washington Week program on PBS. He left the television program to write a book with Bob Woodward. The book, entitled Peril, was released in September 2021. The book debuted at #1 on The New York Times bestseller list and spent nine weeks on the Times' bestseller list for nonfiction books. To promote the book, Woodward and Costa appeared on The Late Show with Stephen Colbert, The View, Meet the Press, Good Morning America, and other programs. In October 2021, Costa was a solo guest on NPR's Fresh Air with Terry Gross. The book has been cited in subpoenas issued by the United States House Select Committee on the January 6 Attack.

In 2022, he left The Washington Post to join CBS News as the network's chief election and campaign correspondent. CBS said Costa would be a "pivotal correspondent" in its coverage of the 2022 midterm elections, the 2024 presidential election, and "the evolving state of American democracy." Costa told the Associated Press that The Washington Post is a "first class organization" and that he was open to potential collaborations between the newspaper and CBS News. Costa has also filled in on the CBS Weekend News on occasion.

During his tenure at CBS News, Costa has been a frequent contributor to CBS Sunday Morning. In 2023, Costa and colleagues at CBS Sunday Morning won an Emmy Award at the 44th News and Documentary Emmy Awards. Costa was cited for his work as a contributing correspondent to the show, which won for "Outstanding Recorded News Program." On August 7, 2024, President Joe Biden "spoke with Robert Costa in his first interview since ending his re-election campaign," which aired on CBS Sunday Morning. It was conducted in Treaty Room on the second floor at the White House in the presidential residence.

In early 2025, CBS announced Costa had officially joined the staff of CBS Sunday Morning, where he serves as a national correspondent and covers "a range of issues," including "politics as well as culture and the arts," according to Variety, which added that Costa "will continue to report on all things in the world of U.S. politics for CBS News, including Congress, the Trump administration, President Trump and potential 2028 candidates." Costa also serves as the network's chief Washington analyst, where he contributes to programs such as the CBS Evening News.

Costa was awarded the National Press Club's highest honor, the Fourth Estate Award, in late 2025 for his "lifetime of contributions to American journalism." He joined a list of recipients that includes Walter Cronkite, Tom Brokaw, and David S. Broder.

In his remarks, Costa spoke "extensively of his approach to reporting, namely a certain degree of humility in approaching subjects and establishing relationships."

== Bibliography ==
- Woodward, Bob; Costa, Robert (September 21, 2021). Peril. New York: Simon & Schuster. ISBN 978-1-9821-8291-5.
