= Plan of Attack =

2004 nonfiction book by Bob Woodward

- Cover of Plan of Attack by Bob Woodward
- Author: Bob Woodward
- Language: English
- Subject: Political science, United States, Iraq, George W. Bush
- Publisher: Simon & Schuster
- Publication date: April 19, 2004
- Publication place: United States
- Media type: Print, ebook, audiobook
- Pages: 480
- ISBN: 978-0-7432-5547-9
- OCLC: 54927217
- Dewey Decimal: 956.7044/31 22
- LC Class: DS79.76 .W66 2004b
- Preceded by: Bush at War
- Followed by: State of Denial: Bush at War, Part III

Plan of Attack is a 2004 book by the American author and investigative reporter Bob Woodward. It was promoted as "a behind-the-scenes account of how and why President [George W.] Bush decided to go to war against Iraq".

The book's chief contention, which provides the rationale for its title, is that President Bush planned from early in his presidency to remove Saddam Hussein from power by force, after the failure of serious and extensive diplomacy. The book describes White House deliberations implying that if Saddam were removed from power without a military invasion, Iraq would need a foreign-implemented regime change. It focuses mainly on President Bush, Vice President of the United States Dick Cheney, U.S. Secretary of Defense Donald Rumsfeld, U.S. National Security Advisor Condoleezza Rice, U.S. Secretary of State Colin Powell, General Tommy Franks, and CIA Director George Tenet, as well as Prime Minister of the United Kingdom Tony Blair. Other fixtures are White House advisers such as Karen Hughes and Karl Rove.

== Content ==
Plan of Attack picks up where Woodward's previous work, Bush at War, left off, focusing on the decision-making that led up to the U.S.-led war in Iraq. As a result of the broad access Woodward was granted to the White House and to interview Bush administration officials, the book is able to paint a realistic picture of what happened behind the scenes. Woodward's own approach is to resist making judgements about the war itself, but rather try to describe the decision-making process. As a result of refraining to interpret the story that he presents, Woodward has been described as being both opposed to the Bush administration by some, as well as an apologist of the administration by others.

Woodward describes in Plan of Attack a small group of administration officials including Vice-President Dick Cheney and Defense Secretary Donald Rumsfeld who were urging the President to go to war in Iraq beginning shortly after the September 11, 2001 attacks. Secretary of State Colin Powell and General Tommy Franks are described as being part of a group within the government more skeptical of the plan to invade Iraq.

In the narrative, President George W. Bush is described as having been intent on exercising a policy of regime change with regard to Iraq immediately after 9/11, a perspective that remained largely unchanged throughout the debates that would follow.

Secretary of State Colin Powell is depicted as being increasingly at odds with members of the Bush administration, and even goes as far as to reject some of the evidence put forward on weapons of mass destruction. This depiction is despite the fact that he gave hours of testimony to the UN to convince them of the presence of weapons of mass destruction. However, by the end of the book, Powell ultimately endorses the invasion, a decision which is not entirely explained, other than to suggest Powell may have lined up with the President out of a sense of duty.

The Bush administration's own view of Plan of Attack is convincing. When the book was published the administration denied many of the accounts in the book, but the Bush/Cheney re-election campaign listed Woodward's book as recommended reading nevertheless. The Kerry/Edwards campaign also listed the book as recommended reading.

== Book versus individual accounts ==
- Bob Woodward says Bush decided that the United States would invade Iraq on January 11, 2003. In interviews, Donald Rumsfeld and Condoleezza Rice have stated the decision was much later – not until March. Paul O'Neill, on the other hand, stated that the decision was made in January 2001, well before even the September 11 attacks.
- In the book, CIA director George Tenet is noted as responding to skepticism that Saddam Hussein had weapons of mass destruction by leaping out of his chair and exclaiming "It's a slam dunk case!" Later, Tenet is forced to admit that his intelligence was flawed when months of post-war searches turned up nothing. In 2007, during an interview on 60 Minutes, Tenet claimed that his words were taken out of context.
- Woodward portrays Secretary of State Colin Powell as reluctant to go to war and often at odds with other Bush administration officials. Powell has stated for the record that he was always fully supportive of the administration and its efforts to invade Iraq, although he wanted tens or hundreds of thousands more soldiers on the ground.
- General Tommy Franks calls Pentagon official Douglas Feith "the fucking stupidest guy on the face of the earth". In his biography, American Soldier, General Franks clarified the context of this phrase by stating that he was talking to his subordinates who were upset with Rumsfeld.
