= Alfred E. Woodward =

American lawyer, judge and naval officer

- Born: Alfred Eno Woodward II; December 15, 1913; Sandwich, Illinois, U.S.
- Died: February 20, 2007 (aged 93); Wheaton, Illinois, U.S.
- Education: Oberlin College (BA); Northwestern University (LLB)
- Occupation: Judge
- Spouses: Jane Upshur; Alice Elizabeth Ensko (m. 1957; died 1999)
- Children: 3, including Bob
- Parent: Alfred E. Woodward I (1870–1936)

Alfred Eno Woodward II (December 15, 1913 – February 20, 2007) was an American attorney and jurist who served as the Chief Judge of the 18th Judicial Circuit Court, DuPage County, Illinois, from 1973 to 1975. He was the father of reporter and author Bob Woodward.

== Early life and education ==
Woodward was born on December 15, 1913, in Sandwich, Illinois, to Alfred E. Woodward I (1870–1936) and Mabel Coleman (1873–1952). Mabel and Alfred had three children, including John Woodward.

Woodward attended Oberlin College in Ohio on a football scholarship in 1931, where he majored in political science. In 1934, he was captain of the college football team and he graduated in 1935. After graduation, he attended the Northwestern University School of Law, where he graduated in 1938.

== Career ==
After getting his law degree, Alfred moved to Wheaton, Illinois, where he joined his brother, John, who operated a law partnership. Alfred married Jane Barnes around 1940, then joined the United States Navy with the rank of ensign and served in the Pacific Theater, as a communications officer. He married Jane Upshur and had two sons and a daughter, Robert Upshur Woodward, in 1943, David Woodward, and Anne Woodward. Alfred was promoted to the rank of Lieutenant in 1945. He was discharged from the Navy in January 1946 and he went home to Wheaton and joined his brother's law firm. Later after a divorce, Alfred would marry Alice Elizabeth Ensko (1924–1999) who had three children of her own, Lynn, Michael, and Susan, and they had one daughter together, Wendy Woodward.

In 1950, Alfred became a full partner in his brother's law firm of Rathje and Woodward along with Louis Rathje, cousin of Frank C. Rathje. He later served as President of the DuPage County Bar Association, starting in 1956. In 1967, he was elected to the American College of Trial Lawyers. He became a judge on the Eighteenth Judicial Circuit Court of Illinois in 1970 and was Chief judge from 1973 to 1975. He left the Eighteenth in 1977 and was appointed to the Second District Appellate Court.

Alfred Woodward retired from the bench at age 81 in 1994. The Second District Appellate Court then appointed him to serve as that Court's representative on the Agency's Board of Commissioners in June 1996. He was also a fellow of the Illinois Bar Foundation.

== Death ==
Woodward died of congestive heart failure on February 20, 2007. He had been hospitalized with Alzheimer's for several years. Alfred was buried in Wheaton Cemetery.
