= Robert Ensko =

American silver expert (1855–1934)

Robert F. Ensko Sr.
- Born: November 17, 1855; Manhattan, New York City
- Died: May 13, 1934 (aged 78); Manhattan, New York City
- Occupation: Author
- Known for: Early Makers of American Silver
- Children: Stephen Guernsey Cook Ensko

Robert F. Ensko I (October 17, 1855 – May 13, 1934) also known as Robert Ensko Sr. was a Manhattan silver expert and author of Makers of Early American Silver in 1915. The book in its multiple editions has become the standard reference work for antique American silver.

== Silver ==
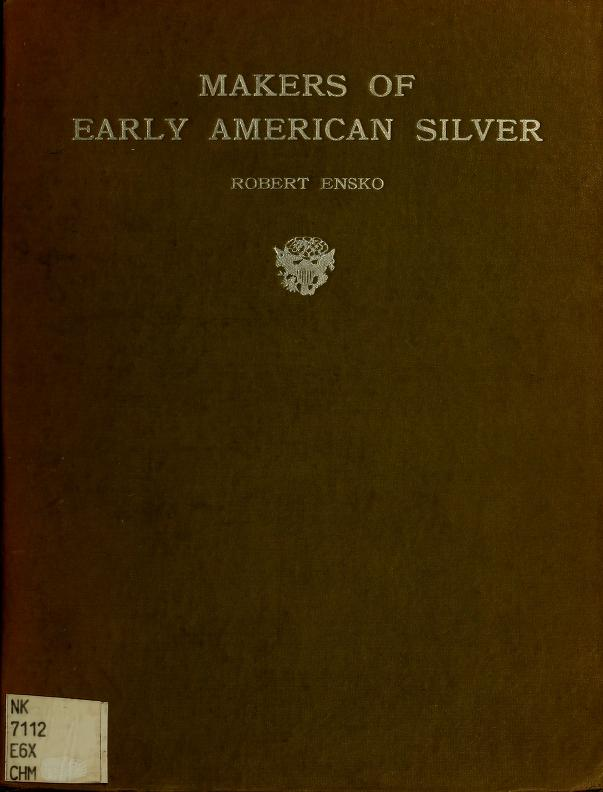
Makers of Early American Silver, 1915

Robert started a family business of making modern reproductions of antique silver in New York and he authored a book: Makers of Early American Silver in 1915. Joslin Hall writes:

In this work Ensko was attempting to list known and unknown makers of American silver, their locality and working dates. He lists marks where they are known, and ... concedes the honor of being the first book of marks of American silversmiths to [the] French because Ensko does not actually picture reproductions of the marks themselves, but simply lists them. He also includes several lists of unknown marks, including a group of pieces from the Clearwater Collection, and asks the readers to send him any information they might have. An exceedingly interesting seminal study of American silversmiths.

His son Stephen Guernsey Cook Ensko (1896–1969) would eventually publish three more editions of the book, and his granddaughter Dorothea Charlotte Ensko (1920-2014) would publish an additional one. Robert appears in the 1920 and 1930 Manhattan Directory dealing in "antiques" at 682 Lexington Avenue, and living at 799 Park Avenue.

== Death ==
He died on May 14, 1934, and his funeral notice appeared in the New York Times on May 15, 1934. He was buried in Green-Wood Cemetery in Brooklyn on May 16, 1934. The probating of his will was reported on May 24, 1934.

== Ensko books ==
- 1915 Makers of Early American Silver Robert Ensko (1852–1934)
- 1927 American Silversmiths and Their Marks; Stephen Ensko (1896–1969)
- 1937 American Silversmiths and Their Marks; Stephen Ensko (1896–1969)
- 1948 American Silversmiths and Their Marks; Stephen Ensko (1896–1969)
- 1992 American Silversmiths and Their Marks; Dorothea Charlotte Ensko (1920-2014) and Vernon Charles Wyle (1912–1986)
