= Bush at War =

2002 nonfiction book by Bob Woodward

- Author: Bob Woodward
- Language: English
- Subject: War in Afghanistan
- Genre: Nonfiction
- Publisher: Simon & Schuster
- Publication date: 2002-11-18
- Publication place: United States
- Media type: Hardcover; Paperback
- ISBN: 978-0-7432-4461-9
- OCLC: 52726634
- Followed by: Plan of Attack

Bush at War is a 2002 book by The Washington Post reporter Bob Woodward recounting President George W. Bush's responses to the September 11 attacks and his administration's handling of the subsequent War in Afghanistan.

Much of the book recounts events in meetings of the United States National Security Council (NSC), with the major players in the story, including the President, Dick Cheney, Colin Powell, George Tenet and Condoleezza Rice, developed from NSC meeting notes and Woodward's interviews with administration officials.

Woodward especially focuses on the administration's decision to go to war in Afghanistan and its strategic and tactical decisions. As one of the first detailed accounts of these decisions, prior to inside accounts like Richard A. Clarke's Against All Enemies, Woodward's book was widely acclaimed, getting praise from The Times and other major papers. The book was criticized by Michael Scheuer, former CIA chief of the Bin Laden station, in his book Imperial Hubris for offering a platform for government leaks, which he deemed harmful to national security: "After reading Mr. Woodward's Bush at War, it seems to me that the U.S. officials who either approved or participated in passing the information—in documents and via interviews—that is the heart of Mr. Woodward's book, gave an untold measure of aid and comfort to the enemy."
