= Matt Pottinger =

American journalist, Marine Corps officer, and former government official (born 1973)

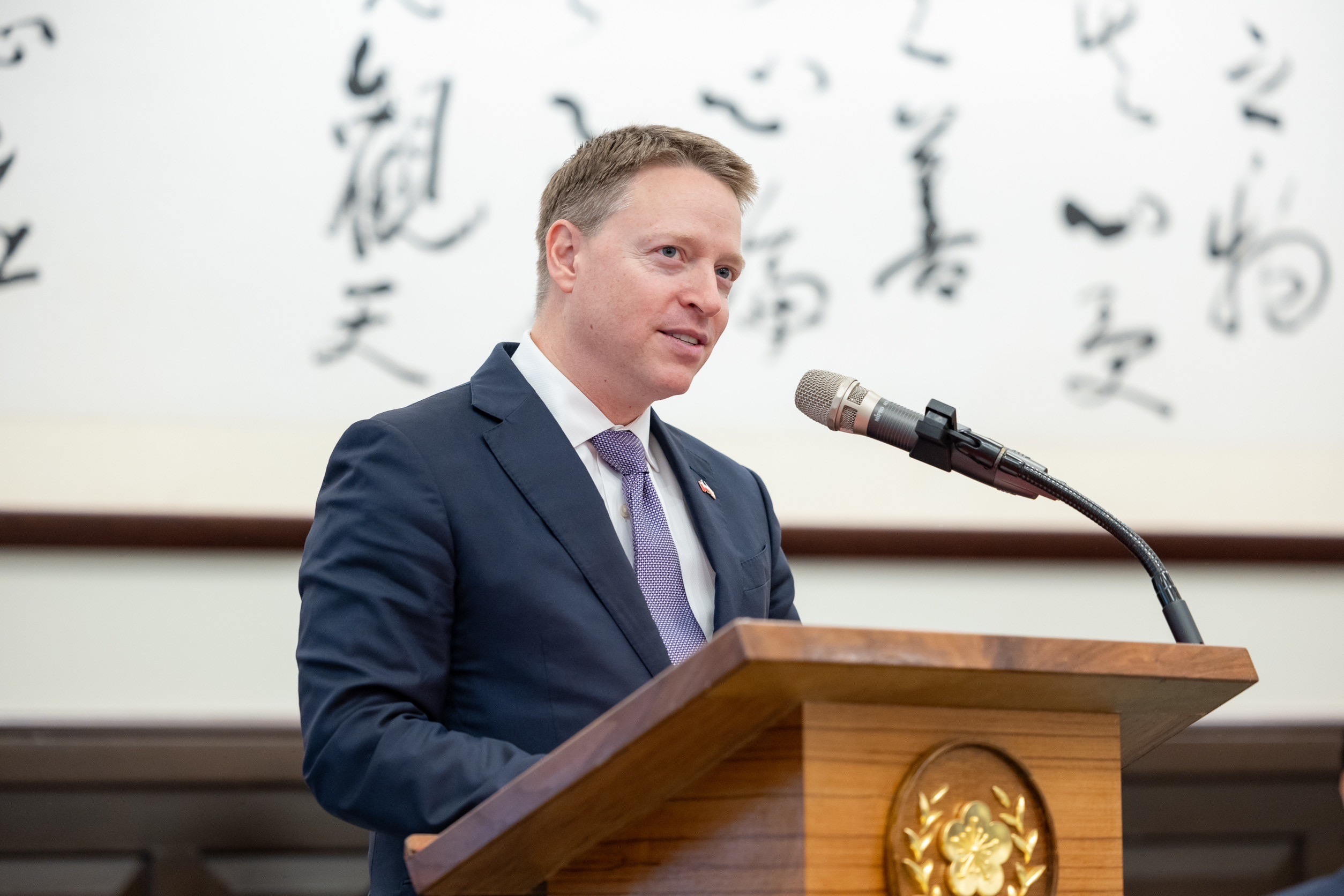
- Pottinger in 2024

32nd United States Principal Deputy National Security Advisor
- In office September 22, 2019 – January 7, 2021
- President: Donald Trump
- Preceded by: Charles Kupperman
- Succeeded by: Jonathan Finer

Personal details
- Born: Matthew Forbes Pottinger; 1973 (age 52–53)
- Spouse: Yen Duong (m. 2014)
- Children: 2
- Parent: John Stanley Pottinger (father)
- Education: University of Massachusetts, Amherst (BA)

Military service
- Allegiance: United States
- Branch/service: United States Marine Corps; Marine Corps Reserve
- Years of service: 2005–2010 (active); 2010–present (reserve)
- Rank: Major
- Battles/wars: Iraq War; War in Afghanistan
- Awards: Bronze Star; Combat Action Ribbon; Defense Meritorious Service Medal

Chinese name
- Chinese: 博明
Transcriptions
Standard Mandarin
- Hanyu Pinyin: Bó Míng

Matthew Forbes Pottinger (/ˈpɒtɪndʒər/ POT-in-jər; born 1973) is an American former journalist and U.S. Marine Corps officer who served as the United States deputy national security advisor from September 22, 2019 to January 7, 2021. Previously Asia senior director on the National Security Council since 2017, his tenure was unusual among senior aides serving under President Trump for its length, given an administration marked by high turnover. Pottinger worked to develop the Trump administration's policies towards China.

Pottinger resigned in the afternoon of January 6, in response to the 2021 United States Capitol attack. He left the White House the following morning. Pottinger currently serves as Chairman of the China Program at the Foundation for Defense of Democracies (FDD); the CEO of Garnaut Global, a strategic advisory firm focused on geopolitics; and is a Distinguished Visiting Fellow at the Hoover Institution.

== Early life and education ==
Pottinger is the son of Gloria (Anderson) and author and former Department of Justice official J. Stanley Pottinger. He was educated at Milton Academy and was a schoolmate and childhood friend of John Avlon. Pottinger graduated from the University of Massachusetts Amherst with a Bachelor of Arts degree in Chinese studies and is fluent in Mandarin.

== Career ==
=== Journalism ===
Before he joined the United States Marine Corps, Pottinger worked as a journalist for Reuters between 1998 and 2001. Then he moved to The Wall Street Journal until his retirement from journalism in 2005. For four years, he was a regular guest on the John Batchelor Show radio program. His stories won awards from the Society of Publishers in Asia. He covered a variety of topics, including the SARS epidemic and the 2004 Indian Ocean earthquake and tsunami; in the latter assignment, he met United States Marines and was inspired by their courage. He spent seven years reporting in China.

=== Military career ===
Pottinger's career switch was motivated by his experience in China and the Iraq War. By 2004, Pottinger had "sort of a sense of unease that China was not really going to converge with the more liberal order." He believed that when it was powerful enough, China would "influence the world on its own terms, on the terms of the ruling party." As he watched the first phase of Iraq War unfold from a distant location in China, he was a bit troubled that "as a nation, the administration, the Congress and to a great extent the press as well had misjudged the nature of conflict." China's rise and the Iraq War had made him realize that democracy is "not inevitable and it shouldn't be taken for granted but it is a form of government very much worth fighting for."

In September 2005, Pottinger joined the Marine Corps and served as a military intelligence officer. He was 32 by the time he was commissioned as a Marine officer. To meet the physical qualifications before entering Officer Candidates School, he worked out with a Marine officer who was living in Beijing. He served three deployments: one (together with Mike Gallagher) in Iraq from April to November 2007, and two in Afghanistan from November 2008 to May 2009 and July 2009 to May 2010. He was the trainer and co-founder of the first Marine Corps Female Engagement Teams on his first deployment in Afghanistan. On his second tour, he met U.S. Army General Michael T. Flynn, with whom he co-wrote a report. The report, published in January 2010 through the Center for a New American Security, was titled Fixing Intel: A Blueprint for Making Intelligence Relevant in Afghanistan. He received a Bronze Star Medal, the Combat Action Ribbon, the 2009 Lieutenant Colonel Michael Kuszewski award and the Defense Meritorious Service Medal.

After he left active service, Pottinger worked in New York City, including for the hedge fund Davidson Kempner Capital Management. From 2010 to 2011, he was Edward R. Murrow Fellow at the Council on Foreign Relations (CFR).

=== Politics ===
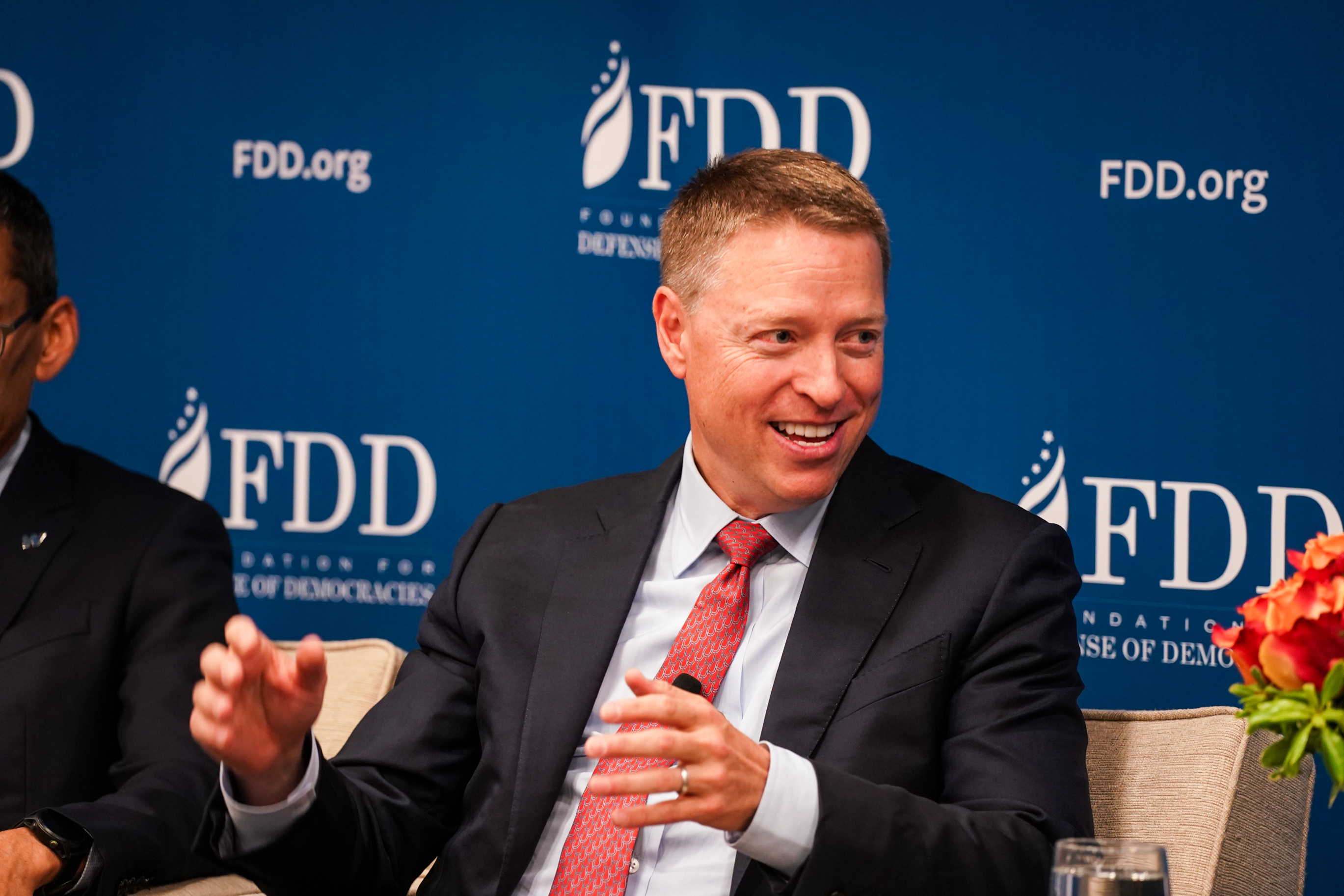
Pottinger at FDD event in October 2024

A 2018 Politico profile described Pottinger as "a fairly typical conservative internationalist" who "has never been a Trump-style #MAGA conservative" and who donated to both Democrats and Republicans. In 2017, he was hired as a member of the U.S. National Security Council of the administration of Donald Trump. Michael Flynn, whom Pottinger had worked for in the military, made him the NSC's Asia director, and he remained in his position under H. R. McMaster and John Bolton.

In his NSC position, Pottinger advocated a tough stance on China that combined trade policy with national security. In September 2019, newly installed National Security Advisor Robert C. O'Brien named Pottinger Deputy National Security Advisor.

Because of his contacts in China, he was an early voice in the Trump administration pushing for more COVID-19 precautions and called for travel ban with China. On January 28, Pottinger met with President Trump and told him that some people in China were testing positive for COVID-19 with no symptoms, which was later confirmed by a NEJM (New England Journal of Medicine) article.

In May 2020, he gave a speech in Mandarin regarding China's May Fourth Movement, a pro-democracy movement that followed World War I. During a virtual conversation hosted by the Ronald Reagan Presidential Foundation on September 30, 2020, Pottinger was asked about the national security implication of Chinese students in the United States. In response, he said "the great majority are people that we're glad to have here and many will stay here and start great businesses." He said it is that one percent of Chinese students that are under contract and have an obligation to bring back everything they know to serve the state back in China.

He was sanctioned by China, in January 2021, alongside 28 other Trump administration officials for alleged violations of China’s sovereignty. President Biden's National Security Council called the sanctions "unproductive and cynical."

Pottinger resigned on January 6, 2021, following the U.S. Capitol attack in which supporters of President Donald Trump invaded the U.S. Capitol building to halt the certification of President-elect Joe Biden's lawful electoral college victory.

In 2021, Pottinger joined the Hoover Institution as a distinguished fellow and is a participant on its "China's Global Sharp Power Project" research team. He serves as chairman of the Foundation for Defense of Democracies' China Program.

In February 2023, Pottinger testified before the United States House Select Committee on Strategic Competition between the United States and the Chinese Communist Party that it had been confirmed that ByteDance had used TikTok to surveil American journalists to identify and retaliate against potential sources.

In March 26, 2025, Pottinger was elected to the RAND Board of Trustees.

== Personal life ==
In 2014, Pottinger married Dr. Yen Duong, a virologist who immigrated to the United States as a child after she and her family fled Vietnam following the Vietnam War. They have two children and live in Utah.
