= John Stanley Pottinger =

American novelist and lawyer (1940–2024)

- Pottinger in 1972

United States Assistant Attorney General for the Civil Rights Division
- In office 1973–1977
- President: Richard Nixon; Gerald Ford
- Preceded by: David Norman
- Succeeded by: Drew S. Days III

Personal details
- Born: February 13, 1940 Dayton, Ohio, U.S.
- Died: November 27, 2024 (aged 84) Princeton, New Jersey, U.S.
- Party: Republican
- Spouse: Gloria Anderson (m. 1965; div. 1975)
- Children: 3, including Matt
- Education: Harvard University (BA, JD)
- Website: stanpottinger.com

John Stanley Pottinger (POT-in-jər; February 13, 1940 – November 27, 2024) was an American lawyer and novelist. He held senior federal civil rights enforcement positions under Presidents Richard Nixon and Gerald Ford and later worked in private law, investment banking, and fiction writing.

Born in Dayton, Ohio, Pottinger earned his bachelor's degree in 1962 and his law degree in 1965 from Harvard University. After practicing law in California, he entered federal service. He served as director of the Office for Civil Rights at the Department of Health, Education, and Welfare and as Assistant Attorney General for the Civil Rights Division at the Department of Justice from 1969 to 1977. In those roles, he oversaw school desegregation and equal employment enforcement and served as a federal negotiator during the American Indian Movement occupation of Wounded Knee.

He later resumed private legal practice and worked in investment banking before becoming a novelist. His books included The Fourth Procedure (1995). He privately identified Mark Felt as "Deep Throat", the anonymous source in the Watergate investigation, decades before Felt publicly confirmed his identity.

== Early life and education ==
John Stanley Pottinger was born on February 13, 1940, in Dayton, Ohio. His father, John Pottinger, founded an insurance company that was one of the few firms that served Black clients, and his mother, Elnora (née Zeller), managed the household. He was the second of three sons and grew up in Dayton, where he played football. Pottinger later credited his father with shaping his awareness of civil rights.

Pottinger attended Harvard University and earned a degree in government in 1962, and then graduated from Harvard Law School with a Juris Doctor in 1965. Afterwards, he moved to California and entered private practice in San Francisco. Outside of his law practice, he handled pro bono habeas corpus petitions for indigent prisoners. In 1969, he successfully argued a habeas corpus case before the United States Supreme Court.

While in San Francisco, he served as president of the Richmond District community council and sat on the board of the nonprofit organization Lighthouse for the Blind. In 1966, his interest in politics led him to volunteer for the successful campaign of Republican candidate Robert Finch for lieutenant governor of California.

== Government service ==
After Richard Nixon was elected president in 1968 and appointed Robert Finch as Secretary of Health, Education, and Welfare, Pottinger became a regional attorney for the department. Seeking firsthand knowledge of conditions in migrant labor camps, he lived with his family in one such camp for several weeks. In 1970, he became director of its Office for Civil Rights in Washington D.C., overseeing nationwide compliance efforts in education and related programs. He remained in the post after Elliot Richardson succeeded Finch.

=== Assistant Attorney General for Civil Rights ===
In January 1973, when Richardson became attorney general, Pottinger was appointed Assistant Attorney General for the Civil Rights Division at the Justice Department. Later that year, during the Saturday Night Massacre, Nixon ordered Richardson to dismiss special prosecutor Archibald Cox who was investigating the Watergate break-in. Richardson and Deputy Attorney General William Ruckelshaus resigned rather than carry out the order, and Solicitor General Robert Bork ultimately dismissed Cox. Pottinger later recalled watching Richardson clear out his office, describing him as composed and unsurprised by the turn of events. Pottinger continued serving at the Justice Department through the Ford administration until 1977.

As head of the Civil Rights Division, Pottinger enforced equal employment opportunity protections for minorities and women and supported school desegregation efforts in the South. His work frequently put him at odds with both Congress and the administration over issues such as busing. In 1974, he raised a Section 5 objection to a proposed New York City redistricting plan, concluding that it would concentrate Black voters in a single congressional district while fragmenting neighboring Black and Puerto Rican communities. The following year, he testified before Congress in support of extending Section 5 of the Voting Rights Act of 1965. He later described his tenure as “a bizarre balancing act, trying to do liberal work in a conservative administration.”

=== Negotiator and FBI oversight ===
Pottinger also acted as a negotiator and reviewer, as part of the Justice Department's civil rights enforcement efforts. He was chief federal negotiator during the 1973 standoff involving the American Indian Movement at Wounded Knee. He reopened investigations into the student protest shootings at Kent State and Jackson State, and led the department's review in 1975 of the FBI's files on Martin Luther King Jr., finding no evidence of bureau involvement in King's assassination. He also examined broader FBI practices, including the Counter Intelligence Program.

At President Carter’s request, Pottinger remained for four months into the new administration to lead a grand jury investigation of illegal FBI break-ins, unrelated to Watergate. During the proceedings, he asked former FBI deputy director Mark Felt whether the Nixon White House had pressured the bureau to conduct black-bag operations. Felt denied it, but offhandedly remarked that he was such a frequent visitor to the White House that some people thought he was “Deep Throat". Later, when a juror asked Felt directly, if he had been Bob Woodward’s confidential source in the Watergate scandal, he denied it but appeared unsettled, convincing Pottinger he was the source. Recognizing the delicacy of the situation, Pottinger stopped the stenographer from recording the exchange, reminded Felt that he was under oath, and offered to withdraw the question since it was outside the scope of the inquiry, which Felt requested. Pottinger kept the information private, until Felt publicly confirmed his identity in 2005.

== Private practice ==
After leaving the Department of Justice in 1977, Pottinger began his own law practice in Washington, D.C. In 1981, he moved to New York City and opened a boutique investment firm. During the economic expansion of the 1980s, he invested in New England real estate and was financially successful, but lost most of his money in the 1987 market downturn.

=== Iran hostage crisis ===
While in private practice, Pottinger became involved in discussions related to the Iran hostage crisis through his client, Cyrus Hashemi. In December 1979, he drafted and sent to Deputy Secretary of State Warren Christopher a memorandum from Hashemi outlining proposed negotiation points between the United States and Iran. Hashemi also offered to act as an intermediary, mentioning his contacts within the Iranian government, including Mohammad Beheshti and Akbar Hashemi Rafsanjani.

Pottinger subsequently helped Hashemi in his interactions with U.S. officials. This included handling, through his office, the partial return of funds that had been provided by the Central Intelligence Agency to Hashemi in connection with support for the campaign of former Iranian defense minister Ahmad Madani in the January 1980 presidential election.

On July 2, 1980, Pottinger traveled with Hashemi to Madrid. He went, with the knowledge of the State Department, to meet Reza Passindideh, the nephew of Ayatollah Ruhollah Khomeini, in an effort to establish an informal communication channel with the Iranian leadership during the crisis. Although the meeting initially appeared promising, it did not lead to a diplomatic breakthrough, and the Carter administration pursued other diplomatic channels.

=== Illegal arms transfers ===
The Federal Bureau of Investigation later investigated illegal arms-related activities involving the Hashemi brothers. According to a federal indictment based on electronic surveillance of Cyrus Hashemi's office, Pottinger discussed Iranian requests for arms shipments with Hashemi on October 21, 1980, and on December 10, 1980, spoke with Cyrus and Reza Hashemi about arranging such shipments through shell companies to conceal the parties and destination.

During this period, Hashemi also proposed locating the assets of the former shah, an initiative of interest of Iranian parliamentary leader Rafsanjani, and one of the original points of consideration in the U.S.–Iran hostage negotiations. Pottinger was not charged when the Hashemi brothers were indicted in 1984 for the illegal arms sales. A potential case against him was complicated after three key tapes in which he discussed arms sales went missing from the FBI.

=== Epstein business partnership ===
Pottinger subsequently partnered with Jeffrey Epstein in the early 1980s, with the pair offering tax strategies to wealthy clients for a brief period.

== Fiction writing ==
Following the financial downturn, Pottinger took night courses in filmmaking at New York University, before turning to fiction writing. His first novel, The Fourth Procedure (1995), became a New York Times best seller and sold over a million copies. He subsequently published A Slow Burning (1999), The Last Nazi (2003), and The Boss (2005). Before his death, he completed a fifth novel described by his son as a spy thriller; it remained unpublished at the time of his death.

== Later legal work ==
In 2013, Pottinger was a signatory to an amicus curiae brief submitted to the Supreme Court in support of same-sex marriage during the Hollingsworth v. Perry case.

=== Lawyer for Epstein victims ===
Pottinger later became co-counsel with Bradley Edwards in representing more than 20 survivors of Jeffrey Epstein's sexual abuse.

According to Edwards, the two first met in 2014 via a late-night phone call from Pottinger offering assistance with litigation against Epstein. Edwards was initially suspicious and became further concerned when Pottinger said he worked with Epstein, explaining that they were not in the same firm and had only shared office space for a few weeks. He ultimately set aside these concerns and partnered with Pottinger.

In 2025, The New York Times reported that Pottinger and Epstein were business partners and shared office space. Edwards said he was unaware of this at the time. In Edwards's memoir, Epstein is described as saying that he and Pottinger had worked in the same office in New York. The Wall Street Journal reported that a 2006 email from the Epstein files showed Pottinger writing to Epstein after his arrest in Palm Beach on charges of unlawful sex acts with a minor, expressing support and predicting that the situation would pass.

== Personal life and death ==
Pottinger began dating Gloria Anderson in high school. They married in 1965 and had three children together, including former U.S. Deputy National Security Advisor Matt Pottinger. Pottinger and Anderson divorced in 1975.

He later had a nine-year relationship with Gloria Steinem that ended in 1984. Other former partners included Kathie Lee Gifford, Connie Chung, and publisher-turned-agent Joni Evans. Pottinger died from cancer in Princeton, New Jersey, on November 27, 2024, at the age of 84.

== Books ==
- Pottinger, John Stanley (1995). The Fourth Procedure. London: Coronet. ISBN 978-0-340-65754-6. OCLC 60295511. OL 18211195M.
- —— (2000). A Slow Burning. London: Coronet. ISBN 978-0-340-69592-0. OCLC 59407299. OL 18423342M.
- —— (August 1, 2003). The Last Nazi. New York: St. Martin's Press. ISBN 978-0-312-27676-8. OCLC 1060711578. OL 3690512M.
- —— (2005). The Boss. New York: St. Martin's Press. ISBN 978-0-312-27677-5. OCLC 71189917. OL 32081916M.
