= Ashley Chapman Hoff =

Former U.S. Attorney in Texas

United States Attorney for the Western District of Texas
- In office February 7, 2021 – December 9, 2022
- President: Joe Biden
- Preceded by: Gregg N. Sofer
- Succeeded by: Jaime E. Esparza

Personal details
- Education: Texas Christian University (BA); Baylor University School of Law (JD)

Ashley Chapman Hoff is an American attorney who served as the United States Attorney for the Western District of Texas. She was appointed U.S. Attorney on January 26, 2021, by order of the judges of the U.S. District Court for the Western District of Texas, effective February 7, 2021. Hoff was appointed to replace Gregg N. Sofer, who in turn had been appointed to the role in October 2020 by then-Attorney General William Barr following the resignation of John Bash.

On December 6, 2022, President Biden nominated former El Paso District Attorney Jaime Esparza to succeed Hoff as U.S. Attorney. Esparza was sworn in on December 9, 2022.
