= Zina Bash =

American attorney and political consultant

Personal details
- Born: Zina Linda Gelman Monterrey, Mexico
- Spouse: John Bash (m. 2007)
- Education: Harvard University (AB, JD); University of Pennsylvania (MBA)

Zina Gelman Bash is an American attorney who was a senior counsel to Texas Attorney General Ken Paxton in 2018. After leaving Paxton's office in 2021, she joined the law firm Keller Lenkner (now Keller Postman). As a private attorney, Bash has continued to perform work for Paxton's office.

== Background and education ==
Bash is the daughter of Lawrence Gelman, an anesthesiologist and hospital executive. She was born in Monterrey, Mexico and raised in McAllen, Texas.

She is Roman Catholic, although she also has Jewish ancestry. Her father is the descendant of Holocaust survivors, while her mother is of Mexican descent.

In 2004, Bash received her Bachelor of Arts from Harvard University, where she served on the Undergraduate Council Election Commission. In 2007, she graduated with a Juris Doctor from Harvard Law School, where she was an editor of the Harvard Law Review. She also holds a Master of Business Administration from the University of Pennsylvania’s Wharton School.

== Personal life ==
In 2007, she married John Bash, who served as the United States Attorney for the Western District of Texas from 2017 to 2020.

== Career ==
Bash clerked for Brett Kavanaugh, then judge of the United States Court of Appeals for the District of Columbia Circuit, and afterward for justice Samuel Alito of the United States Supreme Court during the 2013–14 term.

She has practiced law as an appellate attorney at Gibson, Dunn & Crutcher LLP and was executive vice president of operations and business development at Doctors Hospital at Renaissance in Edinburg, Texas.

She served as deputy director of Policy and Communications for U. S. Senator Ted Cruz’s 2016 Presidential campaign and Senior Counsel to the Senate Judiciary Committee in U.S. Senator John Cornyn’s office.

In 2017, Bash served in the Trump administration as Special Assistant to the President for regulatory reform, legal and immigration policy on the Domestic Policy Council. Prior to Trump taking office, she served on his agency landing team for the Department of Justice. In July 2018, she was named senior counsel on the executive leadership team of Texas Attorney General Ken Paxton, but had left by August to assist Judge Kavanaugh during his Supreme Court nomination hearing before the Senate.

In 2021, Bash joined the law firm Keller Lenkner (now known as Keller Postman). Paxton subsequently outsourced work to Bash as a private attorney that she charged significantly more for ($3,780 per hour) than when she worked in Paxton's office ($641 per hour). By 2024, Keller Postman had earned $97 million from Paxton's office for its work on a lawsuit against Meta Platforms, of which Bash’s work alone accounted for $3.6 million.

== See also ==
- List of law clerks for the eighth seat of the Supreme Court of the United States
