= Fixing Intel: A Blueprint for Making Intelligence Relevant in Afghanistan =

- The report
- Author: Michael T. Flynn; Matthew Pottinger; Paul D. Batchelor
- Publisher: Center for a New American Security
- Publication date: January 2010
- Pages: 26

Fixing Intel: A Blueprint for Making Intelligence Relevant in Afghanistan was a report published by the Washington D.C.–based think tank Center for a New American Security that examined the role and relevance of the U.S. intelligence community in ongoing counterinsurgency efforts in Afghanistan and recommended a reform of intelligence-gathering and analytical efforts. The 26-page long report was authored by Lieutenant General Michael T. Flynn, at the time a senior intelligence officer in Afghanistan, Captain Matthew Pottinger, a Marine Corps officer and Flynn aide, and Defense Intelligence Agency adviser Paul D. Batchelor.

The report argues that the United States has placed the focus of much of its intelligence resources on militant groups in the region and too little on the country of Afghanistan as a whole and the people itself creating an environment in which the U.S. is unable to adequately conduct the war.

== Contents ==
Fixing Intel was written in 2009 and draws off the personal experiences of the authors as well as interviews with hundreds of people both within and outside of the intelligence community. The report is meant to address fundamental problems in how the United States pursues intelligence-gathering in the War in Afghanistan and offers a critique, as well as a litany of recommendations on how the intelligence community operates. Notably, it casts doubt on the effectiveness of American intelligence assets that place the brunt of their focus on studying and observing various insurgent groups while remaining unacquainted with local economics, powerbrokers, and the relationships between various villages and ethnic groups and the government. The report was aimed at informing U.S. military commanders and intelligence officials on the inability to "answer fundamental questions about the environment in which we operate and the people we are trying to protect and persuade."

=== Criticisms ===
The report labels U.S. intelligence efforts in Afghanistan as "token and ineffective." One of the major criticisms is the lack of sufficient and effective analysts as well as the absence of guidance from commanders to their intelligence subordinates. The absence of effectual reporting channels inhibits the ability of intelligence-gatherers to report their findings to the appropriate levels. In addition, the United States places an overemphasis on tracking and researching militants while disregarding "population-centric information" such as the productiveness of local contractors, or the state of a heavily trafficked roadways. General Stanley McChrystal stated, "Our senior leaders – the Chairman of the Joint Chiefs of Staff, the Secretary of Defense, Congress, the President of the United States – are not getting the right information to make decisions with ... The media is driving the issues. We need to build a process from the sensor all the way to the political decision makers."

=== Recommendations ===
- Employ analysts at a lower level that have the ability to move between units in the field to communicate with intelligence collectors, such as soldiers speaking with village elders, and allow them to disseminate that information at a higher command level. The authors cite the example of a 2009 U.S. Marine offensive in Nawa District that was effective in gaining local trust, in part because the Marines employed analysts and other intelligence personnel at the company-level.
- Allow for a freer flow of information between various elements on the ground in Afghanistan such as Provisional Reconstruction Teams, civil affairs troops, international aid workers, foot soldiers, etc in order to create a more cogent picture of the situation.
- Intelligence officials should work in a geographic limit rather than a functional one. For example, instead of separating work into areas such as counternarcotics, terrorism, and governance, intelligence officials would instead encompass specific regions of the country to better understand the environment. The authors urge commanders to view the war as a violent political campaign rather than a military conflict, using the example of an electoral campaign.
- Feed all compiled information into one source at the regional command level that works to categorize and distribute the intelligence to appropriate commands. Analysts will examine how enemy operations are evolving, the attitude of local civilians, economic climates, and levels of violence, among other things.
- The establishment of "Stability Operations Information Centers" that work under the umbrella of the U.S. State Department. These SOICs will be responsible for providing crucial information to ground commanders on the political, military, social, and economic climate of the area they are operating in. Reports are to be kept at the lowest classification possible and be disseminated every six weeks.

== Reaction ==
Despite its rebuke of coalition efforts, the report was endorsed by Secretary of Defense Robert Gates who called it "brilliant" and "spot on," though he held reservations about the fact that it was published through a private think tank.

James Philips, a senior fellow at The Heritage Foundation said, "I think it was a valid criticism and I think it's a long-overdue effort to reform intelligence gathering and set things right."

== See also ==
- Iraq Study Group Report
  - Combined Joint Task Force 82
- Military intelligence
