= Jaime E. Esparza =

American lawyer

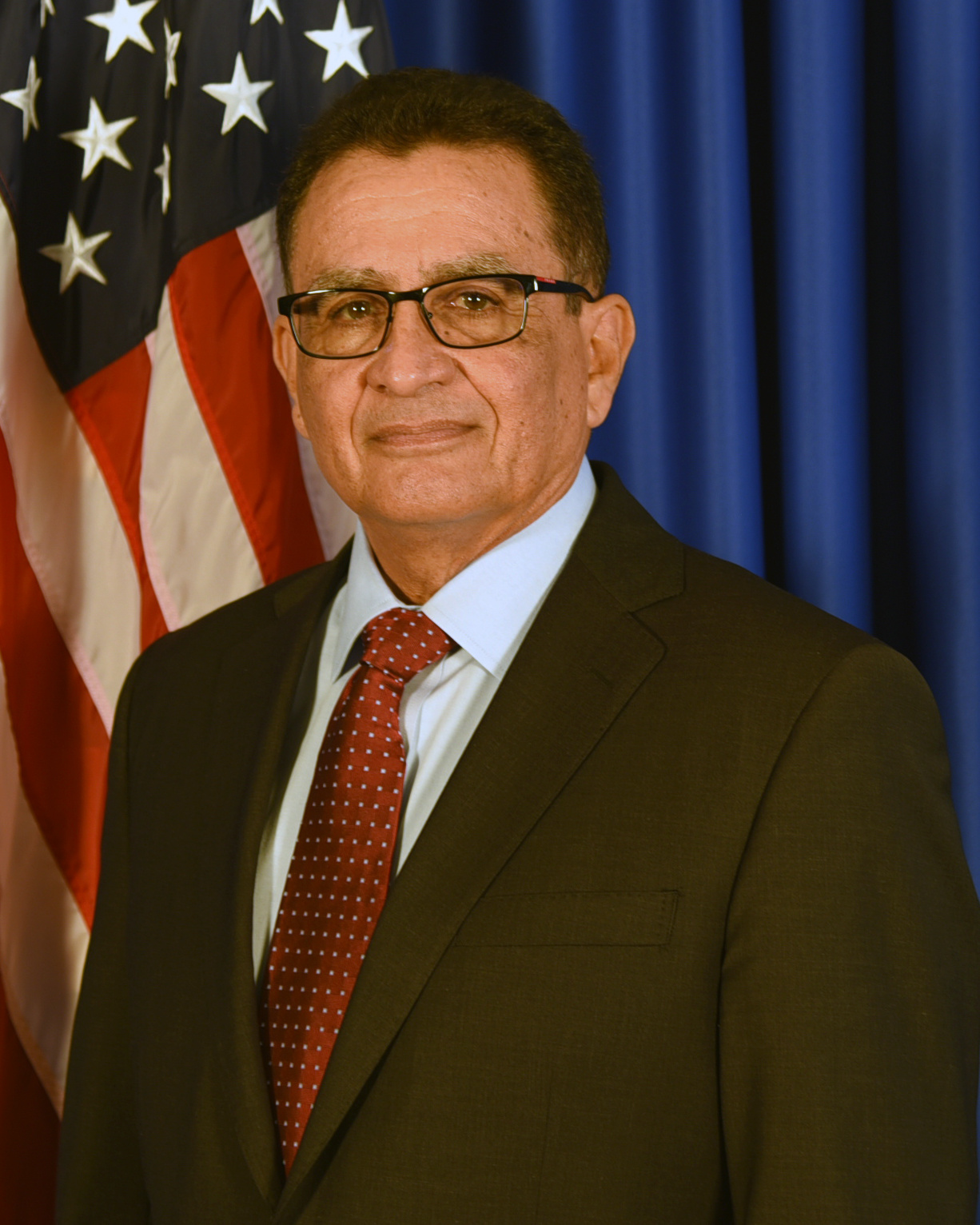

United States Attorney for the Western District of Texas
- In office December 9, 2022 – February 18, 2025
- President: Joe Biden; Donald Trump
- Preceded by: Ashley Chapman Hoff
- Succeeded by: Justin R. Simmons

Personal details
- Born: 1956 or 1957 (age 68–69)
- Party: Democratic
- Education: University of Texas at Austin (BBA); University of Houston (JD)

Jaime E. Esparza (born 1956/1957) is an American lawyer who served as the United States attorney for the Western District of Texas from December 2022 to February 2025.

== Education ==
Esparza received a Bachelor of Business Administration from the University of Texas at Austin in 1979 and a Juris Doctor from the University of Houston Law Center in 1983.

== Career ==
From 1983 to 1987, Esparza served as an assistant district attorney in the Harris County District Attorney's Office in Houston; also in 1987 he served as an assistant district attorney for the 34th Judicial District of Texas. From 1988 to 1991, he was a first assistant public defender for the El Paso County Public Defender's Office and in 1992, he served as an assistant county attorney in the El Paso County Attorney's Office. From 1993 to 2020, Esparza served as the district attorney for the 34th Judicial District of Texas.

=== U.S. attorney for the Western District of Texas ===
On October 14, 2022, President Joe Biden announced his intent to nominate Esparza to be the United States attorney for the Western District of Texas. On November 14, 2022, his nomination was sent to the United States Senate. On December 1, 2022, his nomination was reported out of committee by a voice vote. On December 6, 2022, his nomination was confirmed in the Senate by voice vote. He was sworn in by District Judge Alia Moses on December 9, 2022. Esparza was recommended to the post by Senators John Cornyn and Ted Cruz. He was also recommended and endorsed by Congresswoman Veronica Escobar. He resigned on February 18, 2025.

Legal offices
Preceded by Ashley Chapman Hoff	United States Attorney for the Western District of Texas; 2022–2025	Succeeded by Justin R. Simmons
