= Gregg N. Sofer =

American lawyer

Gregg Sofer
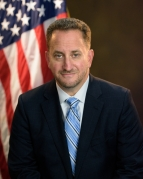

United States Attorney for the Western District of Texas
- In office October 10, 2020 – February 7, 2021
- President: Donald Trump
- Preceded by: John Bash
- Succeeded by: Ashley Chapman Hoff

Personal details
- Education: Rutgers University (BA); New York University (JD)

Gregg N. Sofer is an American lawyer who served as the United States Attorney for the Western District of Texas from 2020 to 2021. Sofer assumed office on October 10, 2020, after the resignation of John Bash.

== Education ==
Sofer earned a Bachelor of Arts degree from Rutgers University and a Juris Doctor from the New York University School of Law.

== Career ==
He began his career at the New York County District Attorney's Office. From 2003 to 2007, Sofer was an attorney at the United States Department of Justice National Security Division. He later served as the director of the Office of Justice for Victims of Overseas Terrorism and National Gang Targeting Enforcement and Coordination Center. For 12 years, Sofer worked as an Assistant United States Attorney in the United States District Court for the Western District of Texas in the Austin branch.

Prior to returning to the Western District of Texas, Sofer had been serving as counselor to Attorney General William Barr.
