= 1966 California lieutenant gubernatorial election =

- November 8, 1966
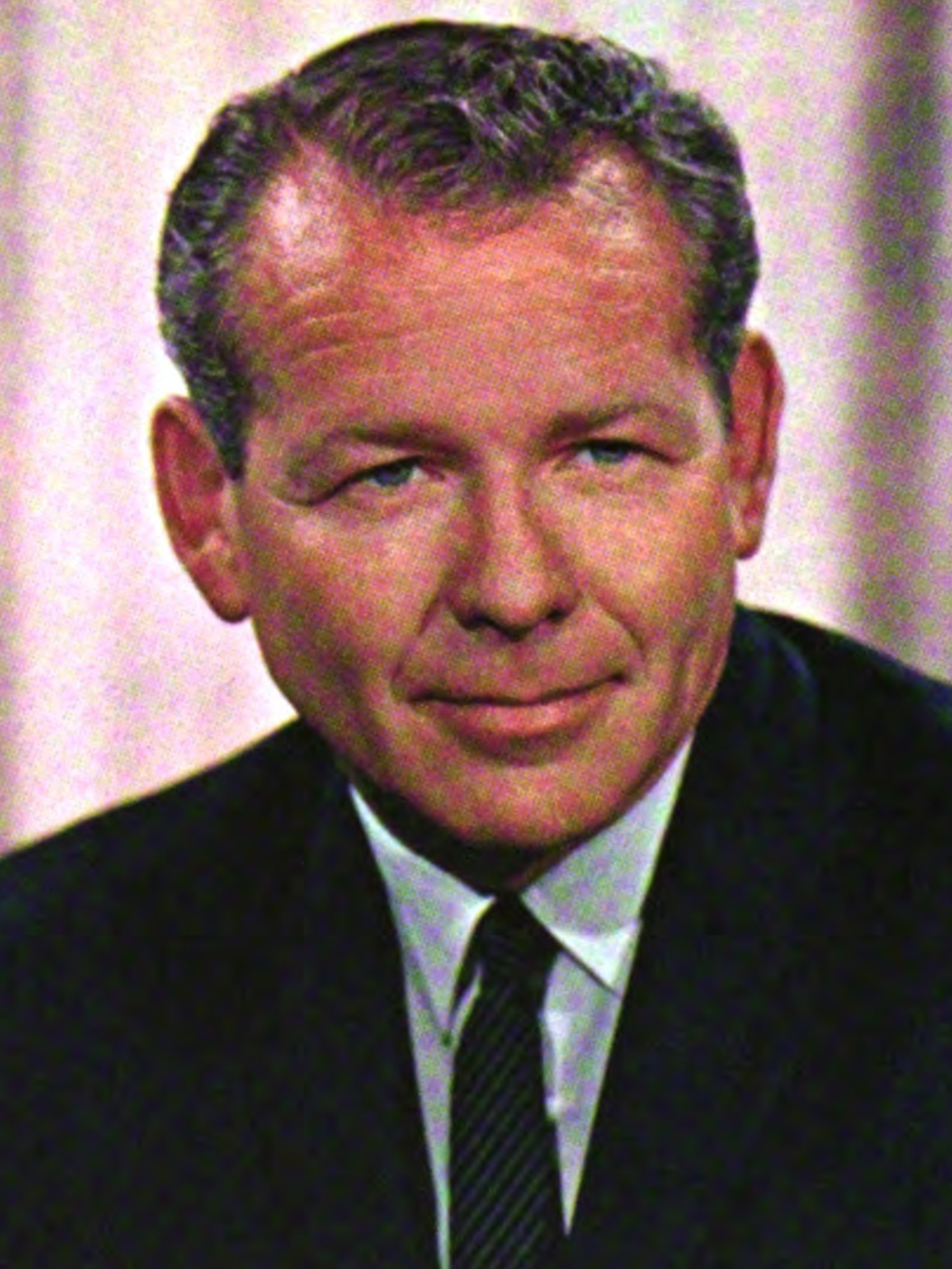

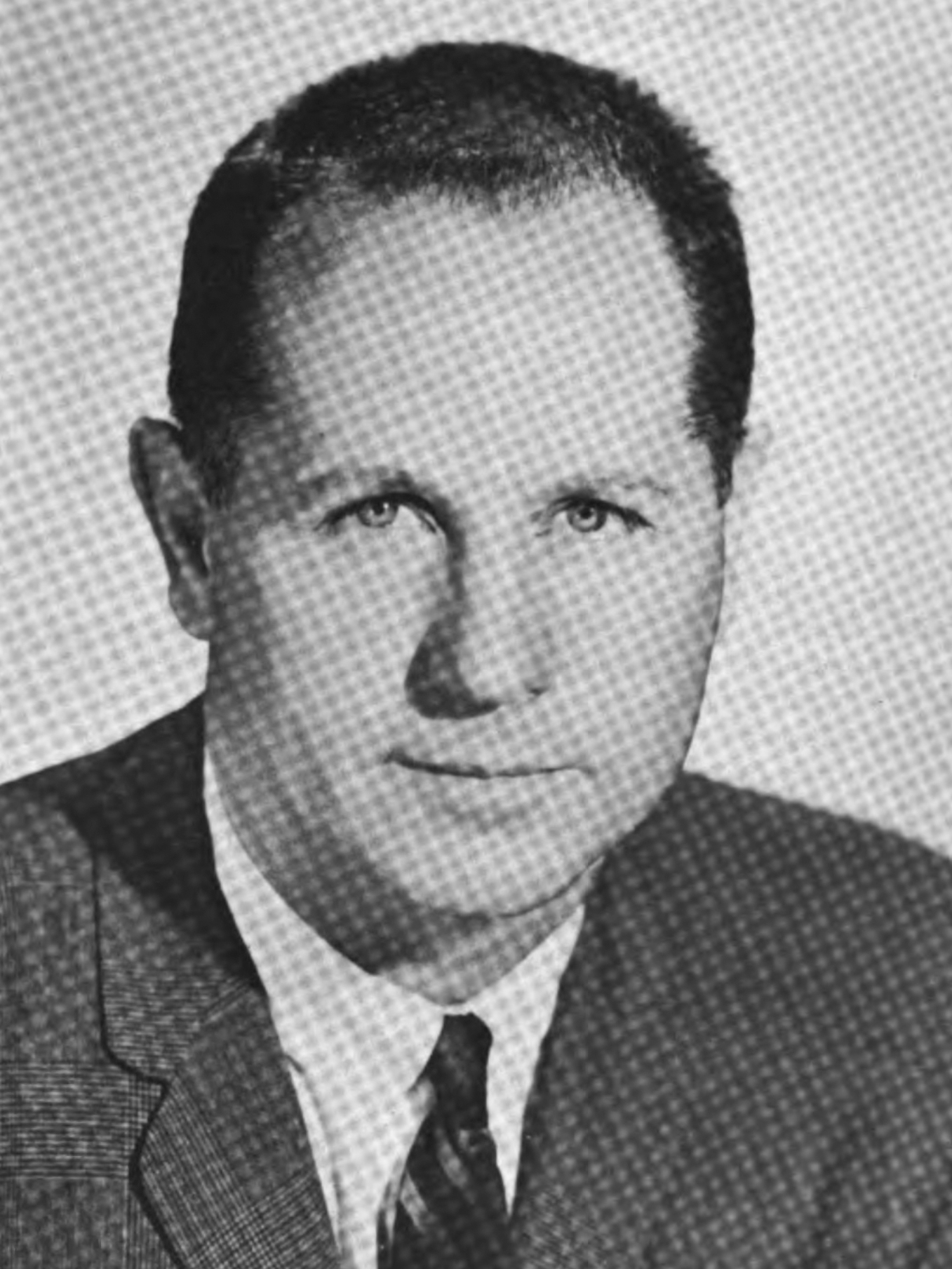
Nominee	Robert Finch	Glenn M. Anderson
Party	Republican	Democratic
Popular vote	3,834,978	2,578,887
Percentage	59.79%	40.21%
- County results Finch: 50–60% 60–70% 70–80% Anderson: 50–60%
Lieutenant Governor before election
Glenn M. Anderson
Democratic
Elected Lieutenant Governor
Robert Finch
Republican

The 1966 California lieutenant gubernatorial election was held on November 8, 1966. Republican nominee Robert Finch defeated Democratic incumbent Glenn M. Anderson with 59.79% of the vote.

== General election ==
=== Candidates ===
- Robert Finch, Republican
- Glenn M. Anderson, Democratic

=== Results ===
1966 California lieutenant gubernatorial election
Party	Candidate	Votes	%	±%
Republican	Robert Finch	3,834,978	59.79%	+11.21%
Democratic	Glenn M. Anderson (incumbent)	2,578,887	40.21%	−11.21%
Majority		1,256,091		
Turnout				
Republican gain from Democratic		Swing		
