= John Bash =

American attorney

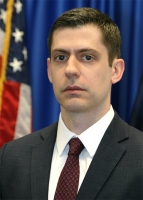

United States Attorney for the Western District of Texas
- In office December 11, 2017 – October 9, 2020
- President: Donald Trump
- Preceded by: Richard Durbin
- Succeeded by: Gregg N. Sofer

Personal details
- Born: John Franklin Bash III; June 7, 1981 (age 45) El Paso, Texas, U.S.
- Party: Republican
- Spouse: Zina Gelman (m. 2007)
- Education: Harvard University (BA, JD)
- Bash's voice Bash's opening statement to the U.S. Supreme Court in Gobeille v. Liberty Mutual Insurance Company; Recorded December 2, 2015

John Franklin Bash III (born 1980/1981) is an American attorney who served as the United States Attorney for the Western District of Texas from 2017 to 2020.

== Early life and education ==
In 2003, Bash graduated from Harvard College, where he was a staff writer for the Harvard Crimson. In 2006 he received a J.D. degree from Harvard Law School, where he was an editor of the Harvard Law Review.

== Career ==
After law school, Bash clerked for Antonin Scalia of the United States Supreme Court during the 2007–08 session, and earlier for Brett Kavanaugh of the United States Court of Appeals for the District of Columbia Circuit.

Following Bash's clerkships, he was an associate attorney at Gibson, Dunn & Crutcher, where his practice focused on complex litigation in federal district and appellate courts. From 2012 to 2017, Bash was an Assistant to the Solicitor General in the United States Department of Justice. In that role, he argued ten cases on behalf of the United States before the Supreme Court of the United States. In 2017, he was a special assistant and associate counsel to U.S. President Donald Trump. On December 11, 2017, he was sworn in as United States Attorney for the Western District of Texas.

Before he was U.S. attorney for the Western District of Texas, Bash's district played a role in the implementation of the Trump administration's family separation policy. A pilot program on family separations was implemented in El Paso, Texas, before Bash was U.S. Attorney, and he did not continue the pilot under his tenure. A memo was prepared for Bash by staff that had participated in the pilot; it showed that if children younger than 12 were separated from their parents, most would not be able to find their way back to their parents. Bash never sent the memo to Justice Department officials in Washington D.C. because, after suggesting they might ask him for the information, the officials never reached out. A draft report by the Department's inspector general's office said that he did not send the memo because he had "no interest in pushing DHS to restart family unit referrals or in nationalizing the concluded pilot program," according to the draft report and that he thought sending the memo would "re-commence the discussion."

Although Bash did not design the Trump administration's family separation policy, he did help carry it out. He initially refused to prosecute two cases leading to the separation of children from their parents. However, after a phone call from Rod J. Rosenstein, then deputy attorney general, he switched course. “Per the A.G.’s policy, we should NOT be categorically declining immigration prosecutions of adults in family units because of the age of a child,” he wrote his staff after a phone call with Rosenstein.

On May 27, 2020, a Justice Department spokeswoman said that Attorney General William Barr had assigned Bash to review practices of the Trump–Russia investigation related to the 2016 "unmasking" of Trump's advisor Gen. Michael Flynn in a phone call with Russian Ambassador Sergey Kislyak. On October 5, 2020, Bash announced he would resign from the DOJ, effective on October 9, after accepting a job with Quinn Emanuel Urquhart & Sullivan, where he co-chairs the firm's national appellate practice, manages the firm's Austin office, and has represented Kenneth C. Griffin, Alec Baldwin, and Elon Musk. Fox News reported that his successor, Gregg N. Sofer, would continue overseeing any ongoing investigations that Bash had led. The Washington Post reported on October 13 that Bash's unmasking inquiry had concluded with no findings of substantive wrongdoing and no public report. Bash's 52-page report, previously classified top secret, was released in May 2022. Bash wrote he had found no evidence that any unmasking requests were made for any political or otherwise improper reasons during the 2016 election period or the ensuing presidential transition.

== 2026 Texas Attorney General campaign ==
On April 9, 2025, Bash announced that he would run for Texas Attorney General, seeking to succeed Ken Paxton, who is running for U.S. Senate. He withdrew on April 30, 2025, citing a family health scare.

== Personal life ==
In 2007, Bash married Zina Gelman, who had also clerked for Judge Brett Kavanaugh.

== See also ==
- List of law clerks for the ninth seat of the Supreme Court of the United States
