= Michael Flynn =

U.S. Army general and former U.S. National Security Advisor (born 1958)

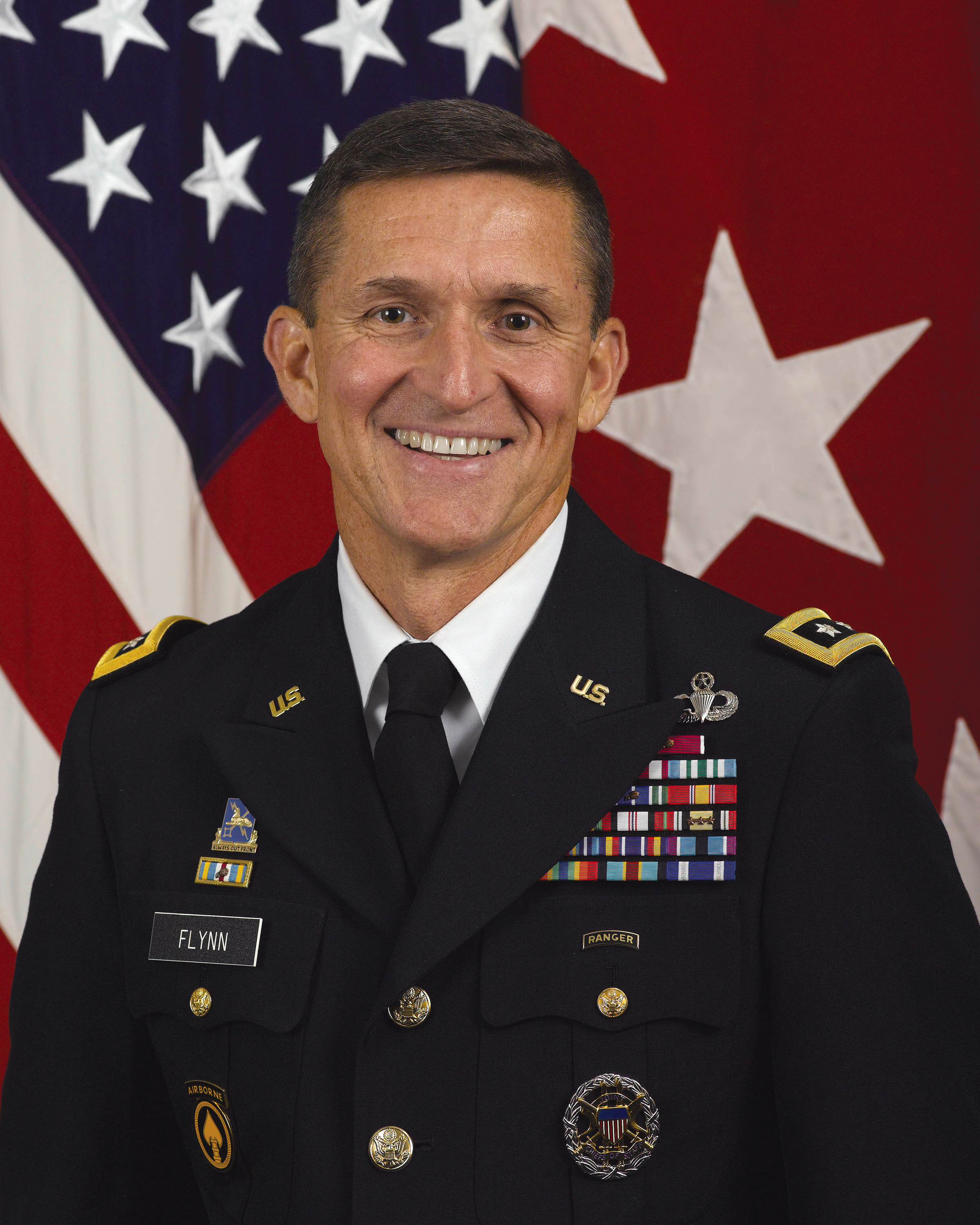
- Official portrait, 2012

24th United States National Security Advisor
- In office 22 January 2017 – 13 February 2017
- President: Donald Trump
- Deputy: K. T. McFarland
- Preceded by: Susan Rice
- Succeeded by: H. R. McMaster

Director of the Defense Intelligence Agency
- In office 24 July 2012 – 7 August 2014
- President: Barack Obama
- Preceded by: Ronald L. Burgess Jr.
- Succeeded by: David Shedd (acting)

Personal details
- Born: Michael Thomas Flynn; 24 December 1958 (age 67) Middletown, Rhode Island, U.S.
- Spouse: Lori Andrade (m. 1981)
- Children: 2
- Relatives: Charles A. Flynn (brother)
- Education: University of Rhode Island (BS); Golden Gate University (MBA); United States Army Command and General Staff College (MMAS); Naval War College (MA)
- Website: Official website

Military service
- Allegiance: United States
- Branch/service: United States Army
- Years of service: 1981–2014
- Rank: Lieutenant General
- Unit: Defense Intelligence Agency; Joint Functional Component Command for Intelligence, Surveillance and Reconnaissance
- Battles/wars: Invasion of Grenada; Operation Uphold Democracy; War in Afghanistan; Iraq War
- Awards: Defense Distinguished Service Medal; Defense Superior Service Medal (4); Legion of Merit (2); Bronze Star Medal (4); Meritorious Service Medal (6); Joint Service Commendation Medal; Army Commendation Medal (5)

Michael Thomas Flynn (born 24 December 1958) is a retired United States Army lieutenant general who served as the 24th U.S. national security advisor for the first 22 days of the first Trump administration. He resigned in light of reports that he had lied regarding conversations with Russian ambassador to the United States Sergey Kislyak. Flynn's military career included a key role in shaping U.S. counterterrorism strategy and dismantling insurgent networks in the Afghanistan and Iraq Wars, and he was given numerous combat arms, conventional, and special operations senior intelligence assignments. He became the 18th director of the Defense Intelligence Agency in July 2012 until his forced retirement from the military in August 2014. During his tenure he gave a lecture on leadership at the Moscow headquarters of the Russian military intelligence directorate GRU, the first American official to be admitted entry to the headquarters.

After leaving the military, in October 2014 he established Flynn Intel Group, which provided intelligence services for businesses and governments, including in Turkey. In December 2015, Flynn was paid $45,000 to deliver a Moscow speech at the ten-year anniversary celebration of RT, a state-controlled Russian international television network, where he sat next to Russian president Vladimir Putin at his banquet table.

In February 2016, Flynn became a national security advisor to Trump for his 2016 presidential campaign. In March 2017, Flynn retroactively registered as a foreign agent, acknowledging that in 2016 he had conducted paid lobbying work that may have benefited Turkey's government. On 22 January 2017, Flynn was sworn in as the National Security Advisor. On 13 February 2017, he resigned after information surfaced that he had misled Vice President Mike Pence and others about the nature and content of his communications with Kislyak. Flynn's tenure as the National Security Advisor is the shortest in the history of the position.

In December 2017, Flynn formalized a deal with Special Counsel Robert Mueller to plead guilty to a felony count of "willfully and knowingly" making false statements to the FBI about the Kislyak communications, and agreed to cooperate with the Special Counsel's investigation. In June 2019, Flynn dismissed his attorneys and retained Sidney Powell, who on the same day wrote to attorney general Bill Barr seeking his assistance in exonerating Flynn. Powell had discussed the case on Fox News and spoken to President Trump about it on several occasions. In January 2020, two weeks before his scheduled sentencing, Flynn moved to withdraw his guilty plea, claiming government vindictiveness and breach of the plea agreement. At Barr's direction, the Justice Department filed a court motion to drop all charges against Flynn on 7 May 2020. Presiding federal judge Emmet Sullivan ruled the matter to be placed on hold to solicit amicus curiae briefs from third parties. Powell then asked the DC Circuit Court of Appeals to compel Sullivan to drop the case, but her request was denied. On 25 November 2020, Flynn was issued a presidential pardon by Trump. On 8 December 2020, Judge Sullivan dismissed the criminal case against Flynn, while stating that he likely would have denied the Justice Department motion to drop the case.

On 4 July 2020, Flynn tweeted a video of himself leading others repeating a pledge commonly associated with QAnon, and as Trump sought to overturn the results of the 2020 presidential election in which he was defeated, Flynn shared a statement calling on Trump to suspend the Constitution and hold a new election under military authority. Flynn later met with Trump and their attorney Powell in the Oval Office to discuss the president's options. Trump denied reports that Flynn's martial law idea had been discussed. Flynn has since become a prominent leader in the Christian nationalist movement, organizing and recruiting for what he characterizes as a spiritual and political war.

== Early life ==
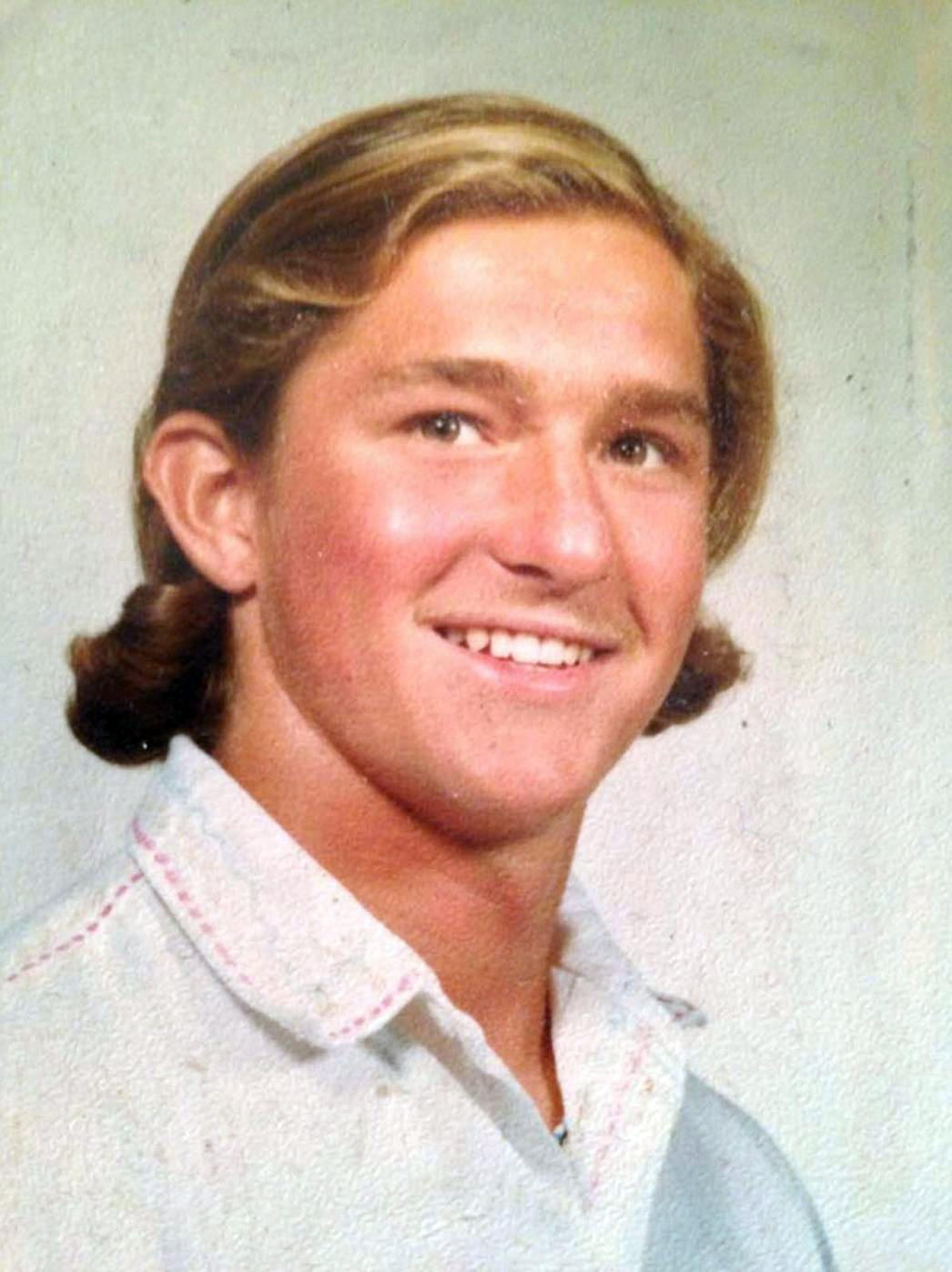
Flynn at Middletown High School, 1977

Michael Thomas Flynn was born and raised in Middletown, Rhode Island, one of nine siblings born to Helen Frances (née Andrews), who worked in real estate, and Charles Francis Flynn, a small-town banker, both Catholics of Irish descent. Flynn's family has a long tradition of serving in the armed forces; Helen's brother was a Navy submarine captain and their father an officer in World War II, Charles's father, Henry E. "Harry" Flynn, served in the Army during World War I, and Charles himself served in World War II and fought during the Battle of the Bulge while traveling under General George S. Patton. Flynn's younger brother, Charles A. Flynn, is a retired four-star general.

On 24 July 1972, after a local girl climbed into a car and accidentally released the parking brake, Flynn and a friend of his rushed to save two toddlers in its path; he was honored by the local town council for this act of heroism. Flynn served time in juvenile detention for what he has described as "serious and unlawful activity" in his youth, the records of which were expunged after he served a year of supervised probation. While at Middletown High School, Flynn met Lori Andrade, daughter of a prominent Portuguese family on Aquidneck Island, whom he married in 1981.

He attended the University of Rhode Island where he initially struggled academically, earning a 1.2 GPA during his freshman year, however he was later awarded a three-year scholarship by the Reserve Officers' Training Corps (ROTC) and ultimately decided not to drop out. He graduated with a Bachelor of Science degree in management science in 1981 and was a Distinguished Military Graduate of the ROTC. Flynn later earned a Master of Business Administration in Telecommunications from Golden Gate University, a Master of Military Art and Science from the United States Army Command and General Staff College, and a Master of Arts in National Security and Strategic Studies from the Naval War College. He is a graduate of the Military Intelligence Officer Basic Course, Ranger School, Military Intelligence Officer Advanced Course, Army Command and General Staff College, the School of Advanced Military Studies, and Naval War College.

== Military career (1981–2014) ==
=== U.S. Army ===
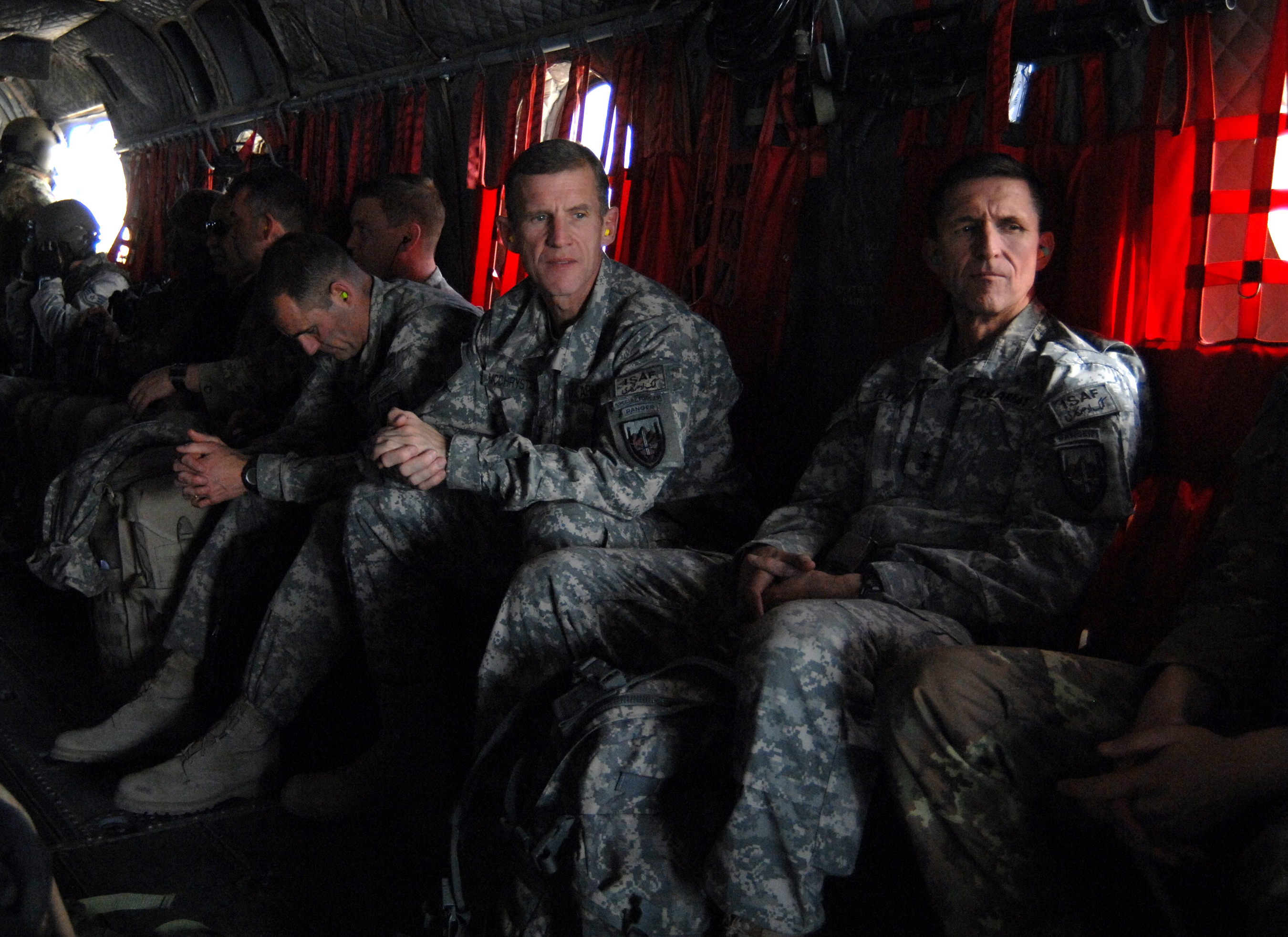
General Stanley McChrystal and Flynn in Afghanistan, 2010

Flynn was commissioned in the U.S. Army as a second lieutenant in military intelligence in 1981. His military assignments included multiple tours at Fort Bragg, North Carolina, with the 82nd Airborne Division, XVIII Airborne Corps, and Joint Special Operations Command, where he deployed for the invasion of Grenada and Operation Uphold Democracy in Haiti. He also served with the 25th Infantry Division at Schofield Barracks, Hawaii, at the Joint Readiness Training Center at Fort Polk, Louisiana, and the Army Intelligence Center at Fort Huachuca, Arizona.

Initially, Flynn was not going to be deployed to Grenada in 1983, but he was able to convince a superior officer to have him included. While serving there, Flynn took a 40-foot leap off a cliff to retrieve two soldiers stranded in the ocean and bring them back to shore to be airlifted. Though he was reprimanded for his unauthorized actions, Flynn garnered respect among his fellow soldiers for what he did.

Flynn served as the assistant chief of staff, G2, XVIII Airborne Corps at Fort Bragg, North Carolina, from June 2001 and the director of intelligence at the Joint Task Force 180 in Afghanistan until July 2002. He commanded the 111th Military Intelligence Brigade from June 2002 to June 2004 and was the director of intelligence for Joint Special Operations Command from July 2004 to June 2007, with service in Afghanistan and Iraq. He and his superior, General McChrystal, streamlined all intelligence so as to increase the tempo of operations and degrade the networks of Al-Qaeda in Iraq. He served as the director of intelligence of the United States Central Command from June 2007 to July 2008, as the director of intelligence of the Joint Staff from July 2008 to June 2009, then the director of intelligence of the International Security Assistance Force in Afghanistan from June 2009 to October 2010. Flynn was reprimanded for sharing classified U.S. intelligence information on the Haqqani network to Pakistani officials in 2009 or 2010. The network, which had been accused of attacking American troops, was a proxy ally of Pakistan.

On 10 November 2015, Flynn gave an interview to the Special Inspector General for Afghanistan Reconstruction (SIGAR) Lessons Learned project. Washington Post published an audio recording of the interview and SIGAR's summary as part of the Afghanistan Papers.

==== Defense Intelligence Agency ====
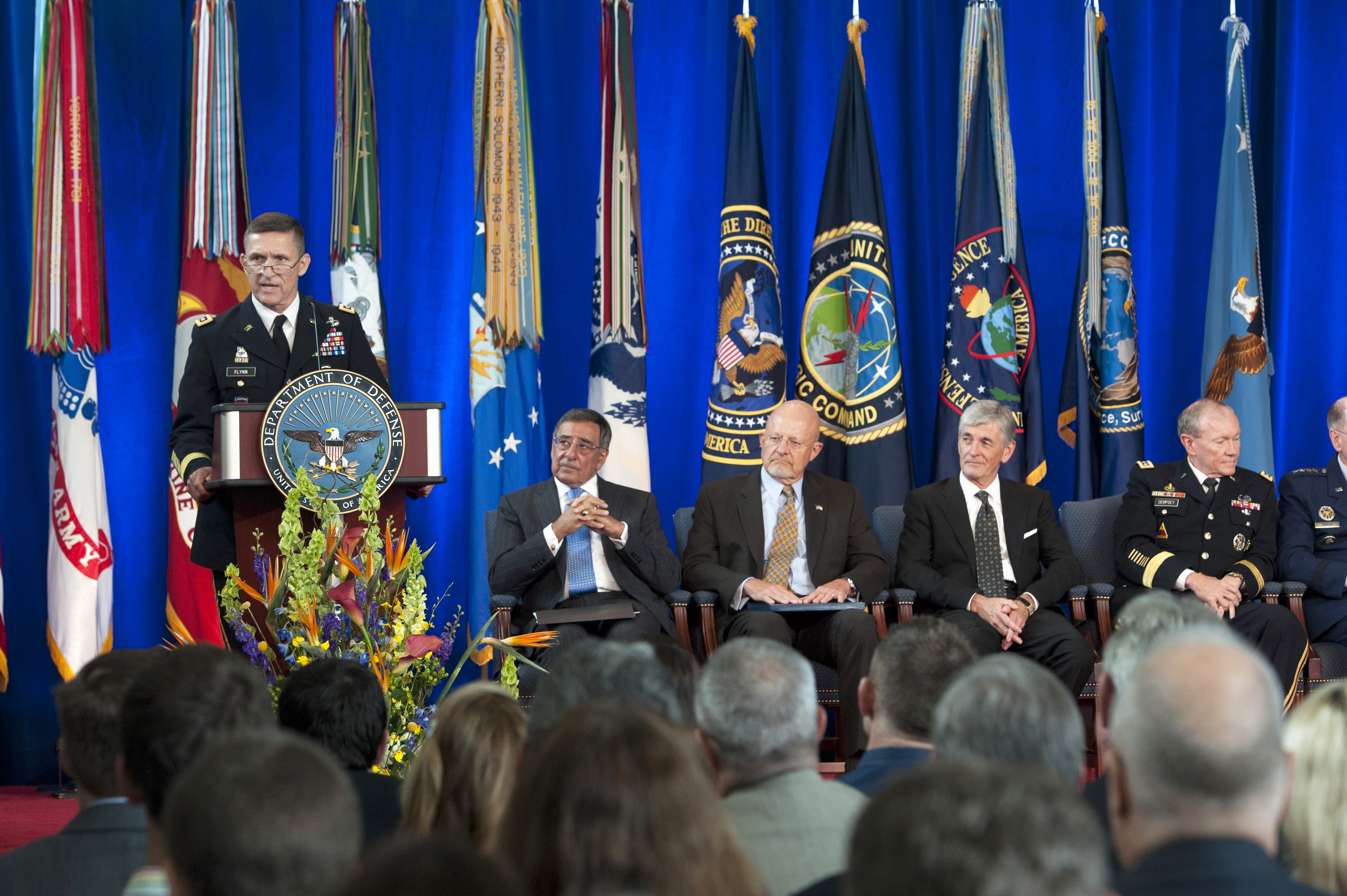
Flynn speaks during the change of directorship for the Defense Intelligence Agency on Joint Base Anacostia-Bolling in Washington, D.C.

Flynn with Martin Dempsey and Ashton Carter, 11 June 2013

In September 2011, Flynn was promoted to Lieutenant General and assigned as assistant director of national intelligence in the Office of the Director of National Intelligence. On 17 April 2012, President Barack Obama nominated Flynn to be the 18th director of the Defense Intelligence Agency. Flynn took command of the DIA in July 2012. He simultaneously became commander of the Joint Functional Component Command for Intelligence, Surveillance and Reconnaissance, and chair of the Military Intelligence Board.

In October 2012, Flynn announced plans to release his paper "VISION2020: Accelerating Change Through Integration", a look at changes he believes are necessary for the DIA in the future.

In June 2013, Michael Flynn became the first U.S. officer to be allowed inside the Russian military intelligence (GRU) headquarters in Moscow, where he arrived at the invitation of the GRU chief General Igor Sergun. His follow-up trip to visit the GRU HQ as Director of DIA was not allowed. Flynn also wanted to invite high-ranking GRU officials to the U.S., but this idea was rejected by the director of national intelligence, James Clapper.

Stefan Halper, who worked for three Republican presidents and was a longtime informant for the American intelligence community, had a February 2014 encounter with Flynn at a London intelligence conference. Halper became so alarmed by Flynn's close association with a Russian woman that a Halper associate expressed concerns to American authorities that Flynn may have been compromised by Russian intelligence.

Colleagues were concerned with Flynn's chaotic management style and increasingly hard-edged views about counterterrorism, and his superiors viewed him as insubordinate, according to Pentagon officials. In mid-2014, his two-year term at the DIA was not extended.

==== Retirement from the military ====
On 30 April 2014, Flynn announced his retirement effective later that year, about a year earlier than he had been scheduled to leave his position. He was reportedly effectively forced out of the DIA after clashing with superiors over his allegedly chaotic management style and vision for the agency. In a private e-mail that was leaked online, Colin Powell said he had heard in the DIA (apparently from later DIA director Vincent R. Stewart) that Flynn was fired because he was "abusive with staff, didn't listen, worked against policy, bad management, etc." According to The New York Times, Flynn exhibited a loose relationship with the truth, leading his subordinates to refer to Flynn's repeated dubious assertions as "Flynn facts".

According to what Flynn had said in one final interview as DIA director, he felt like a lone voice in thinking the United States was less safe from the threat of Islamic terrorism in 2014 than it was prior to the 9/11 attacks; he went on to believe he was pressed into retirement for questioning the Obama administration's public narrative that al-Qaeda was close to defeat. Journalist Seymour Hersh wrote that "Flynn confirmed [to Hersh] that his agency had sent a constant stream of classified warnings ... about the dire consequences of toppling [Syrian President] Assad." Flynn recounted that his agency was producing intelligence reports indicating that radical Islamists were the main force in the Syrian insurgency and "that Turkey was looking the other way when it came to the growth of the Islamic State inside Syria". According to Flynn, these reports "got enormous pushback from the Obama administration", who he felt "did not want to hear the truth". According to former DIA official W. Patrick Lang: "Flynn incurred the wrath of the White House by insisting on telling the truth about Syria ... they shoved him out. He wouldn't shut up." In an interview with Al Jazeera, Flynn criticized the Obama administration for its delay in supporting the opposition in Syria, thereby allowing for the growth of Al-Nusra and other extremist forces: "when you don't get in and help somebody, they're gonna find other means to achieve their goals" and that "we should have done more earlier on in this effort, you know, than we did."

Flynn retired from the U.S. Army with 33 years of service on 7 August 2014.

== Post-military career ==
=== Consulting firm ===
Flynn, with his son Michael G. Flynn, ran the Flynn Intel Group Inc, which provided intelligence services for businesses and governments. The company was founded in the fall of 2014, restarted in June 2015 as a Delaware company, and closed in 2016. Flynn was paid more than $65,000 by companies connected to Russia in 2015, including $11,250 each from Volga-Dnepr Airlines and the U.S. subsidiary of Kaspersky Lab. Other clients included Palo Alto Networks, Francisco Partners, Brainwave Science and Adobe Systems.

While working as a consultant, Flynn served on the board of several organizations, including GreenZone Systems, Patriot Capital, Brainwave, Drone Aviation and OSY Technologies. Subsidiaries of the Flynn Intel Group included FIG Cyber Inc, headed by Timothy Newberry, and FIG Aviation. In July 2018, the consulting firm Stonington Global LLC announced that Flynn was joining the firm as its director of global strategy, though Flynn's attorneys disputed that there had ever been a partnership several hours later.

==== Foreign agent ====
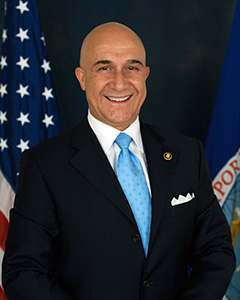
Flynn's former business associate Bijan Rafiekian was charged with illegally acting as an unregistered agent of Turkey. In 2019, a federal judge threw out the guilty verdicts against Rafiekian, citing insufficient evidence to sustain his conviction on either count.

In July 2016, Flynn spoke at a meeting of ACT! for America when the 2016 Turkish coup d'état attempt against Turkish President Recep Tayyip Erdoğan was underway. He spoke favorably of the coup participants, saying that Erdoğan had been moving away from a secular state and towards an Islamist state, and that participants in the coup wanted Turkey to be and to be seen as a secular state—a goal "worth clapping for".

By the end of September 2016, Flynn's consulting company was hired by Inovo BV, a company owned by Kamil Ekim Alptekin, the Chair of the Turkish-American Business Council, which is an arm of the Foreign Economic Relations Board of Turkey (DEIK). The company has links to President of Turkey Recep Tayyip Erdogan. Flynn was paid $530,000 by Alptekin for Flynn's lobbying work. Flynn only registered as a foreign agent with the Justice Department later on 8 March 2017, for the work completed by November 2016. Flynn acknowledged his work may have benefited Turkey's government.

On 8 November 2016 (election day in the United States), an op-ed written by Flynn was published by The Hill, now calling for U.S. backing for Erdoğan's government and criticizing the regime's opponent, Fethullah Gülen, alleging that Gülen headed a "vast global network" that fit the description of "a dangerous sleeper terror network". At the time, Flynn did not disclose that his consulting firm had received funds from a company with ties to the Turkish government. After Flynn's ties had been disclosed by The Daily Caller, Politico, and others, the editor of The Hill added a note to Flynn's op-ed, stating that Flynn had failed to disclose that he had been engaged at the time in "consulting work that might have aided the government of Turkey", that his firm had received payments from a company with close ties to the Turkish government, or that the company had reviewed the draft of the op-ed before it was submitted to The Hill.

On 24 March 2017, former Director of the CIA James Woolsey said that in September 2016 Flynn, while working for the Trump presidential campaign, had attended a meeting in a New York hotel with Turkish officials including foreign minister Mevlüt Çavuşoğlu and energy minister Berat Albayrak, son-in-law of Turkey's President Recep Tayyip Erdogan, and had discussed abducting Fethullah Gülen and sending him to Turkey, bypassing the U.S. extradition legal process.

Flynn sat in on classified national security briefings with then-candidate Trump at the same time that Flynn was working for foreign clients, which raises ethical concerns and conflicts of interest. Flynn was paid at least $5,000 to serve as a consultant to a U.S.-Russian project to build 40 nuclear reactors across the Middle East, which Flynn's failure to disclose was flagged by Representatives Elijah Cummings and Eliot Engel as a possible violation of federal law.

=== Attendance at RT gala dinner ===
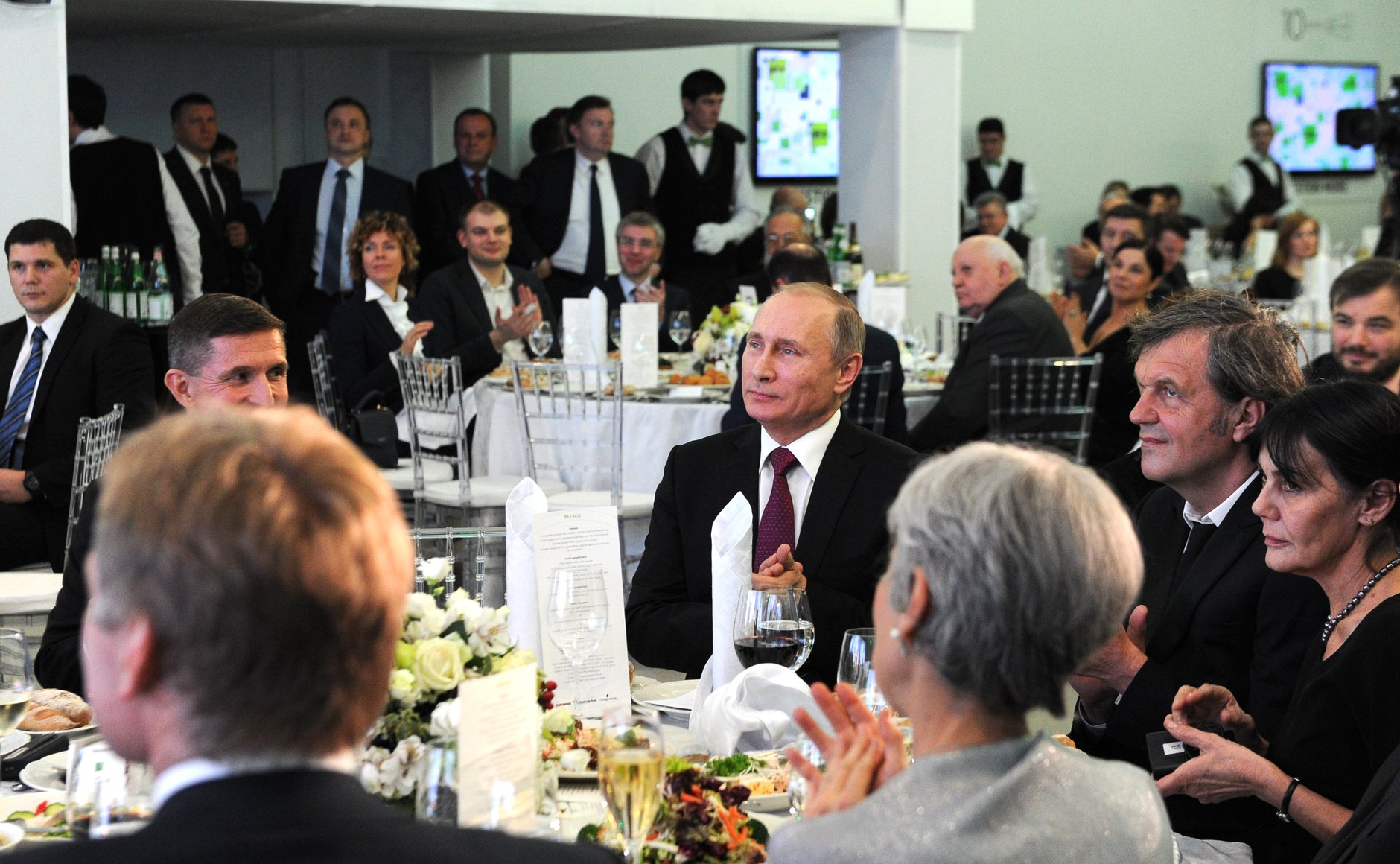
In December 2015, Flynn attended RT's 10th anniversary gala. Flynn is sitting next to Vladimir Putin during the dinner. Jill Stein (in the foreground) and Mikhail Gorbachev (in background) also attended.

On 10 December 2015, Flynn attended a gala dinner in Moscow in honor of RT (formerly "Russia Today"), a Russian government-owned English-language media outlet, on which he made semi-regular appearances as an analyst after he retired from U.S. government service.

Flynn sat next to Russian President Vladimir Putin at the dinner, leading journalist Michael Crowley of Politico to report that "at a moment of semi-hostility between the U.S. and Russia, the presence of such an important figure at Putin's table startled" U.S. officials. As part of the festivities, Flynn gave a talk on world affairs for which he was paid at least $45,000. Flynn defended the RT payment in an interview with Michael Isikoff.

On 1 February 2017, the ranking Democratic members on six House committees sent a letter to Secretary of Defense James Mattis, requesting a Department of Defense investigation into Flynn's connection to RT. The legislators expressed concern that Flynn had violated the Foreign Emoluments Clause of the U.S. Constitution by accepting money from RT.

According to Representative Elijah Cummings of the House Oversight Committee, Flynn in February 2016 had told the Defense Department that he had not received money from foreign companies, and had had only "insubstantial contact" with foreigners. Glenn A. Fine, the acting Defense Department Inspector General, confirmed an investigation of Flynn was opened in April 2017, though it was placed on hold for more than three years while the Justice Department prosecuted Flynn on unrelated charges. After Trump pardoned Flynn in November 2020, the Justice Department notified the Pentagon that the inspector general's investigation could resume. The investigation was completed on 27 January 2021, and its findings forwarded to acting Secretary of the Army John Whitley.

In May 2022, the Army notified Flynn it would seek to recoup over $38,000 of the compensation he had received for the Moscow speech. Flynn was found to have violated the emoluments clause of the Constitution, which applies to military retirees.

=== 2016 U.S. presidential election ===
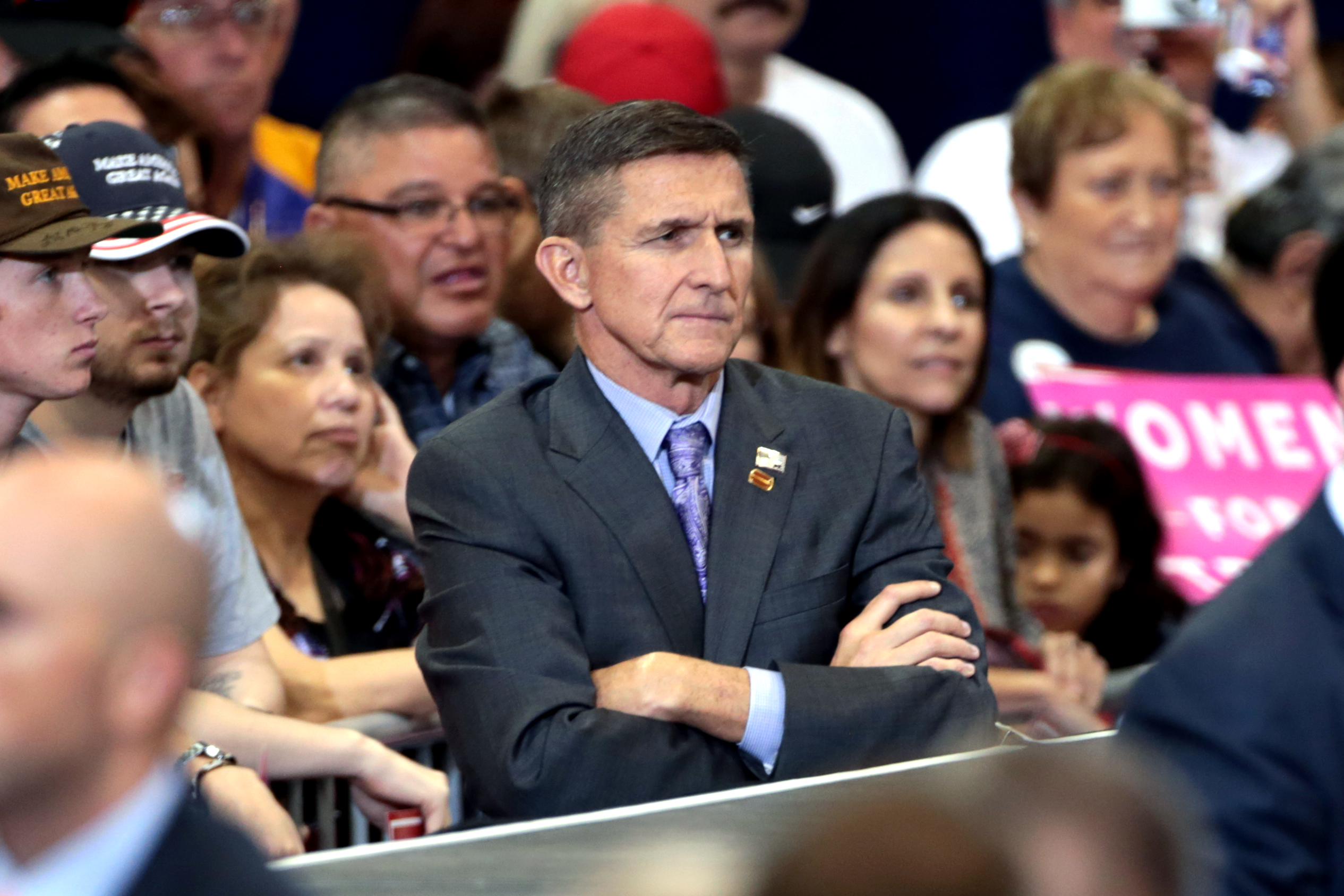
Flynn at a campaign rally, October 2016

Having already been consulted regarding national security by Carly Fiorina as well as other candidates, including Scott Walker, Ben Carson, Ted Cruz, and Donald Trump, Flynn was asked in February 2016 to serve as an adviser to the Trump campaign.

In July 2016, it was reported he was being considered as Trump's running mate; Flynn later confirmed that he had submitted vetting documents to the campaign and, although a registered Democrat, was willing to accept the Republican vice-presidential nomination if chosen. However, Trump instead selected Indiana Governor Mike Pence.

As one of the keynote speakers during the first night of the 2016 Republican National Convention, Flynn gave what the Los Angeles Times described as a "fiery" speech, in which he said: "We are tired of Obama's empty speeches and his misguided rhetoric. This, this has caused the world to have no respect for America's word, nor does it fear our might." He accused Obama of choosing to conceal the actions of Osama bin Laden and the Islamic State of Iraq and the Levant. Flynn went on to criticize political correctness and joined the crowd in a chant of "U-S-A! U-S-A!". During the chants, he told those in the audience, "Get fired up! This is about our country."

During the speech, Flynn attacked Democratic nominee Hillary Clinton; he encouraged the crowd to chant "Lock her up!"; saying "Damn right! Exactly right! There is nothing wrong with that!" He called for Clinton to withdraw from the race, claiming that "if I did a tenth – a tenth – of what she did, I would be in jail today." He repeated in subsequent interviews that she should be "locked up". While campaigning for Trump, Flynn also referred to Clinton as the "enemy camp". Six days after the speech, Flynn stirred up a controversy by retweeting anti-Semitic remarks, which he later apologized for and claimed were unintentional. During the campaign, Flynn also posted links to false articles and conspiracy theories relating to Clinton on Twitter, including the Pizzagate conspiracy theory.

Flynn was once opposed to waterboarding and other torture techniques that have now been banned. However, according to an August 2016 Washington Post article, he said, in the context of Trump's apparent openness to reinstating such techniques, that he "would be reluctant to take options off the table". In May 2016, an Al Jazeera reporter asked Flynn if he would support Trump's stated plan to "take out [the] families" of people suspected of being involved in terrorism. In response, Flynn said, "I would have to see the circumstances of that situation." In an interview with Al Jazeera, Flynn criticized the U.S. reliance on drones as a failed strategy, saying "what we have is this continued investment in conflict. The more weapons we give, the more bombs we drop, that just ... fuels the conflict."

On 16 August 2016, the FBI opened a case on Flynn as part of its Crossfire Hurricane investigation. The purpose of the investigation was to find out if Flynn was knowingly or unknowingly "involved in activity on behalf of the Russian Federation which may constitute a federal crime or threat to the national security" of the United States. A review of the Crossfire Hurricane investigation, done by Justice Inspector General Michael Horowitz, was completed in December 2019. It concluded that "the quantum of information articulated by the FBI to open" the individual investigation on Flynn "was sufficient to satisfy the low threshold established by the [Justice] Department and the FBI". The review "did not find documentary or testimonial evidence that political bias or improper motivation influenced the decisions to open" the investigation against Flynn.

The Trump transition team during the campaign, chaired by Chris Christie, opposed Flynn serving as National Security Adviser or in any other high-level position because he was viewed as "a loose cannon".

==== Advocacy of technology transfer to Saudi Arabia ====
During the 2016 U.S. presidential campaign of Donald Trump, and subsequently, Flynn and Jared Kushner were engaged in promoting IP3 International's plan to transfer nuclear technology from the U.S. to Saudi Arabia, for use in a proposed joint U.S.-French-Russian-British project, in possible violation of the law.

== National Security Advisor (2017) ==
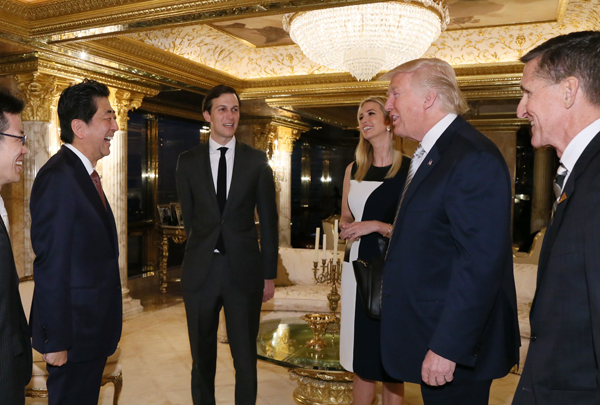
Japanese Prime Minister Shinzō Abe meets with President-elect Trump, Jared Kushner, Ivanka Trump and Flynn in November 2016.

=== Trump administration transition ===
On 18 November 2016, Flynn accepted Trump's offer for the position of National Security Advisor. During their meeting in the Oval Office two days after the election, Obama expressed "profound concerns" about placing Flynn in a sensitive, high-level national security post, and warned President-elect Trump against hiring Flynn. On 4 January 2017, Flynn informed transition team counsel Don McGahn, soon to become the White House Counsel, that he was under federal investigation for secret lobbying work he had done for Turkey during the campaign. Trump later questioned in May 2019 why he had not been told Flynn was under investigation so he could have removed Flynn from his team. Sean Spicer questioned why the Obama administration, if they believed Flynn to be a national-security risk, had failed to revoke Flynn's security clearance.

Prior to his appointment, media sources including The Washington Post and Associated Press had criticized his alleged close relations with Russia, and his alleged promotion of anti-Clinton conspiracy theories and fake news during the 2016 presidential campaign.

In December 2016, Flynn met with Heinz-Christian Strache, leader of the right-wing populist Freedom Party of Austria (FPÖ), at Trump Tower in New York.

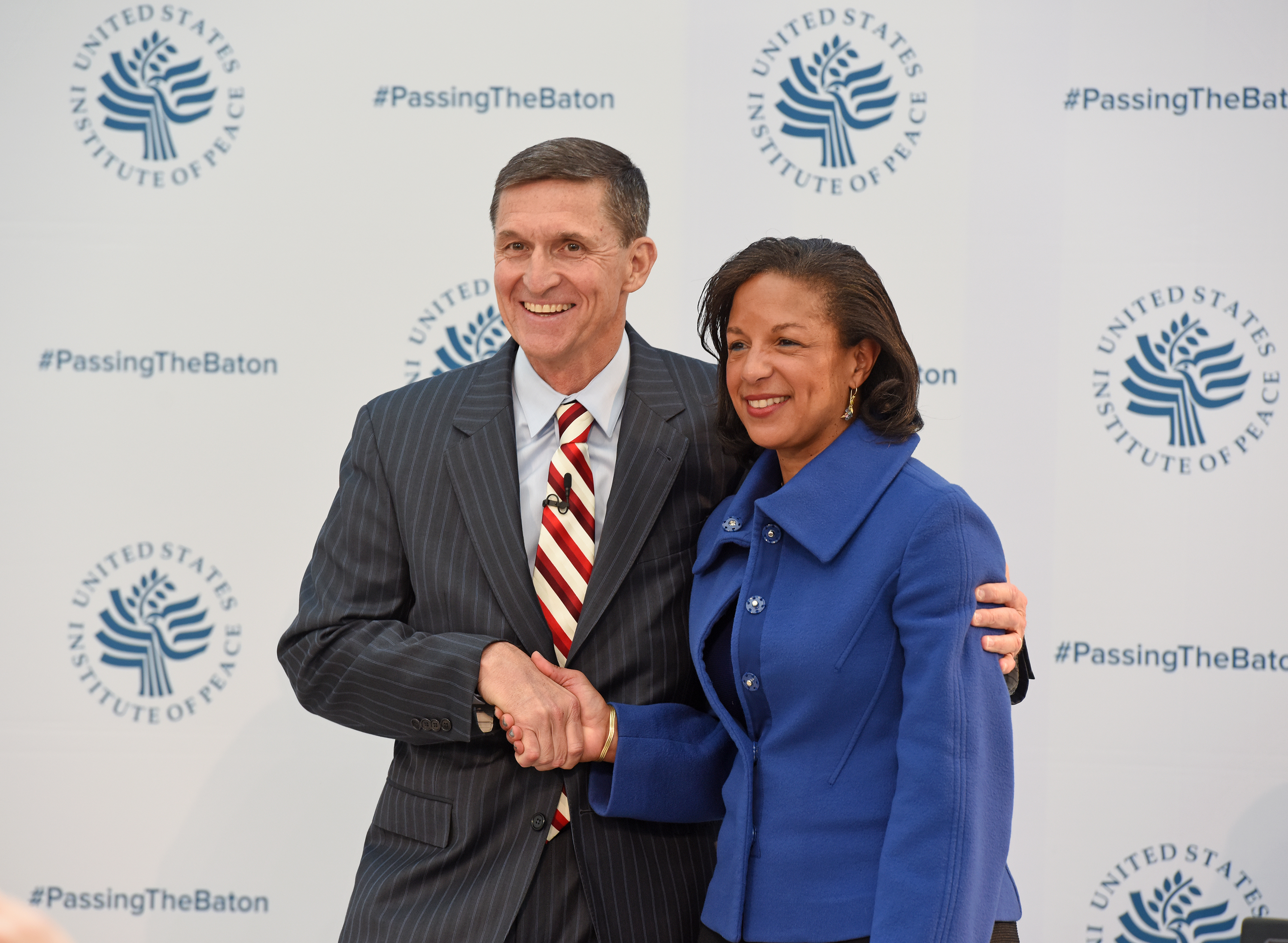
Flynn and Susan Rice in January 2017

Ten days before the inauguration of Donald Trump, Flynn told then-National Security Advisor Susan Rice not to proceed with a planned invasion of Raqqa using Kurdish People's Protection Units. Flynn's decision would delay the campaign—which had taken seven months to plan—for several more months, but was consistent with Turkish objections to working with Kurdish troops.

==== Contacts with the Russian ambassador ====
Flynn's history with Russian ambassador Sergey Kislyak dated to 2013; they met when Kislyak coordinated Flynn's trip to Moscow for Flynn's work with the Defense Intelligence Agency.

On 30 November 2016, Flynn joined a meeting between Trump's son-in-law and adviser Jared Kushner and Kislyak at Trump Tower. U.S. intelligence agencies intercepted Kislyak's report to Russian officials about the meeting. Kislyak wanted Russian generals to discuss the topic of American policy in Syria with the Trump transition team on a secure channel; however, Flynn said the Trump transition team did not possess such channels in their offices. Kushner wanted to use secure channels at the Russian embassy, but Kislyak declined.

Flynn and Kislyak then spoke by phone several times in late December and January. On behalf of the Israeli government, Trump and his transition team called several foreign governments, urging them to oppose or delay a United Nations Security Council resolution condemning Israeli settlements in Palestine. Flynn was tasked by Kushner with talking to Kislyak about this, and they spoke on 22 and 23 December. Russia ultimately chose not to oppose the resolution.

On 29 December, President Obama announced that in response to the Russian government's interference in the 2016 U.S. presidential campaign, the United States would take retaliatory measures, including the expulsion of 35 suspected Russian intelligence agents. Trump and his transition team feared that the sanctions would damage Russia–U.S. relations, and Flynn spoke with Kislyak that day, urging Russia to only respond in a "reciprocal" manner to the sanctions and not escalate. Flynn conferred with incoming deputy national security adviser K. T. McFarland both before and after calling Kislyak, and McFarland informed other Trump transition team members. On 31 December, Kislyak called Flynn, informing him that Putin had not retaliated because the Russian president had accepted Flynn's request. The Obama administration was astonished by Russia's decision not to retaliate. U.S. intelligence agencies routinely monitor Kislyak's calls, and Obama administration officials discovered on 2 January that Flynn had spoken to Kislyak multiple times during the previous few days.

On 12 January, columnist David Ignatius, writing for The Washington Post, made public that Flynn had called Kislyak on 29 December and questioned if Flynn had said anything to "undercut the U.S. sanctions". Flynn instructed K. T. McFarland to lie to The Washington Post that Flynn had not discussed the sanctions with Kislyak; McFarland did this, knowing it was false, and The Washington Post reported the denial. Flynn proceeded to lie about not discussing the sanctions with Kislyak to incoming chief-of-staff Reince Priebus, incoming press secretary Sean Spicer, and Vice President-elect Mike Pence, who repeated Flynn's falsehood to the media. The Mueller Report stated that Obama administration officials feared that these public falsehoods could result in "a compromise situation for Flynn because the Department of Justice assessed that the Russian government could prove Flynn lied".

Flynn's conversations with Kislyak were incidentally intercepted by American intelligence as part of routine surveillance of Russian agents. Per policy regarding American persons, Flynn's identity was masked before accounts of his conversations were distributed to high-level government officials. Some officials, notably national security advisor Susan Rice, were so concerned by the accounts that they requested Flynn's identity be unmasked, per procedure. After the unmasking was reported by the press, Trump and his allies insisted it was evidence the Obama administration was spying on him and his associates for political purposes. In May 2020, Justice Department spokesperson Kerri Kupec announced on the program of Fox News host Sean Hannity that attorney general Bill Barr had appointed U.S. attorney John Bash to investigate. She also stated that John Durham, whom Barr had appointed to investigate the origins of the FBI Crossfire Hurricane investigation, had also been examining the unmasking issue. The Bash investigation was quietly closed five months later, with no public announcement or report, reportedly finding nothing improper. Bash's 52-page report, previously classified top secret, was released in May 2022. Bash wrote he had found no evidence that any unmasking requests were made for any political or otherwise improper reasons during the 2016 election period or the ensuing presidential transition.

=== Tenure, 20 January–13 February 2017 ===
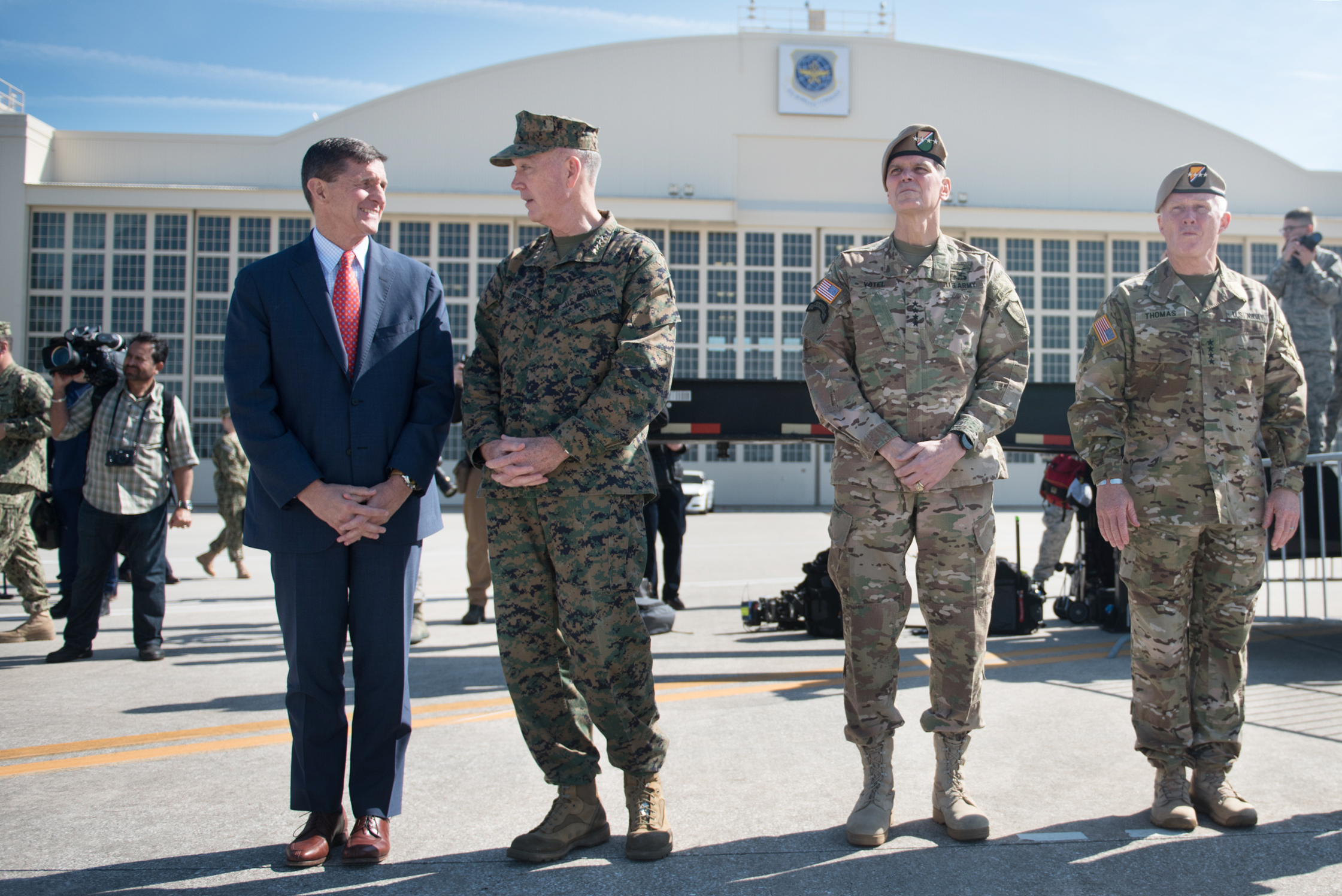
Flynn with General Joseph F. Dunford (Chairman of the Joint Chiefs of Staff), General Joseph Votel and General Raymond A. Thomas at MacDill Air Force Base on 6 February 2017

When he was national security adviser, Flynn urged the U.S. Department of Defense to set up a military communication channel with Russia to protect American and Russian air forces from each other in Syria, and possibly cooperate to take on the Islamic State, reported The Daily Beast website in July 2017. The Department of Defense and U.S. Central Command rejected the idea, reported the website. The National Defense Authorization Act from 2015, had banned the U.S. from cooperating in military matters with Russia unless the Secretary of Defense allowed an exception.

Flynn was an important link in the connections between Putin and Trump in the "Ukraine peace plan", an unofficial plan "organized outside regular diplomatic channels ... at the behest of top aides to President Putin". This plan, aimed at easing the sanctions on Russia, progressed from Putin and his advisors to Ukrainian politician Andrey Artemenko, Felix Sater, Michael Cohen, and Flynn, where he would have then presented it to Trump. The New York Times reported that Sater delivered the plan "in a sealed envelope" to Cohen, who then passed it on to Flynn in February 2017, just before his resignation.

==== Investigations during his tenure ====
In January 2017, then-FBI director James Comey decided to send FBI agents to interview Flynn. Knowing that Flynn had asked Kislyak to ensure Russia did not respond harshly to U.S. sanctions and also that Vice President Pence, Chief of Staff Reince Priebus, and Press Secretary Sean Spicer had all said Flynn told them he had not made such a request, Comey decided that Flynn needed to be interviewed as part of assessing whether Flynn was acting under Russian influence. The FBI discussed how to structure the interview, and then-deputy FBI director Andrew McCabe called Flynn on 24 January, asking him to meet with two FBI counterintelligence agents; Flynn agreed. McCabe also asked if Flynn wanted a lawyer present, to which Flynn said no.

The two agents met Flynn at his office later that day and asked Flynn about his exchanges with Kislyak regarding the late December 2016 United Nations Security Council resolution regarding Israeli settlements. According to the FBI notes, Flynn told the agents he had not tried to influence Russia's vote on the resolution; in fact, he had asked Kislyak to have Russia oppose or delay the resolution. The FBI agents also asked Flynn whether he had asked Kislyak to avoid escalating the diplomatic conflict. According to FBI notes, Flynn responded: "Not really. I don't remember. It wasn't, 'Don't do anything'". After the meeting, the agents prepared an FD-302 form, a form used to summarize an FBI interview, for the discussion with Flynn.

Based on the results of the FBI interview, Acting Attorney General Sally Yates made an "urgent" request to meet with White House counsel Don McGahn, and they met on 26 and 27 January. Yates told McGahn that Flynn had misled Pence and other administration officials about the nature of his conversations with Kislyak and was possibly open to blackmail by the Russians. Former United States Secretary of Defense Robert Gates called the possibility of Flynn being blackmailed "kind of a stretch", while acknowledging that his false statement was "a problem ... that I would tell the president about".

=== Departure ===
Resignation letter provided by Flynn, 13 February 2017

On 9 February 2017, The Washington Post broke the story that Flynn had discussed the U.S. sanctions with Kislyak, contrary to the public denials made by the Trump administration, citing "nine current and former officials". The New York Times confirmed the story by The Washington Post, stating that a transcript of Flynn–Kislyak conversation existed. The Washington Post also reported that on February 8 Flynn had given them flat denials about such discussions. Flynn gave denials despite The Washington Post journalist Karen DeYoung informing him that officials "have listened to the intercepts" of his calls with Kislyak.

After The Washington Post published their story, Flynn's spokesman released a statement on 9 February tempering Flynn's denial, describing that Flynn "had no recollection of discussing sanctions", but also "couldn't be certain that the topic never came up". This happened after Flynn was confronted by Reince Priebus, Don McGahn, and John Eisenberg, who also informed Flynn that there were transcripts of his calls with Kislyak. Flynn told the White House officials he "either was not sure whether he discussed sanctions or did not remember doing so" (which was different from what he told Mike Pence and Sean Spicer in January). Meanwhile, Mike Pence only learned on 9 February that Flynn had lied to him regarding the calls; Pence was informed by that day's media reports, said Pence's spokesman.

As a result of these news reports, public pressure on Flynn increased. On 12 February, Trump's adviser Kellyanne Conway declared that Trump had "full confidence" in Flynn; however, one hour later on the same day, Trump's press secretary Sean Spicer described Trump as "evaluating" Flynn.

On 13 February, Flynn resigned as National Security Advisor, writing that he had given "incomplete information" of his conversations with Kislyak. Flynn's 24-day tenure as National Security Advisor was the shortest in the 63-year history of the office. Before Flynn's resignation, he told the Daily Caller that, in his conversation with Kislyak, he told Kislyak he was aware of the expulsion of the 35 Russians, and that: "We'll review everything."

On 14 February, White House Press Secretary Sean Spicer said Trump had asked for Flynn to resign, "not based on a legal issue, but based on a trust issue", due to "misleading the Vice President and others, or the possibility that he had forgotten critical details of this important conversation", which "created a critical mass and an unsustainable situation".

Later, in December 2017, President Trump said he "had to fire General Flynn because he lied to the Vice President and the FBI", noting that Flynn had "pled guilty to those lies". Also in December 2017, vice president Pence said that by the time Flynn departed the Trump administration, "I knew that he lied to me." Pence also said Trump "made the right decision" to remove Flynn.

== Post-Trump administration fundraising and businesses ==
In June 2024, The New York Times reported that Flynn and family members used his popularity in right-wing circles for paid speeches and consulting and selling branded clothing and other gear online.

After Flynn's legal problems ended with Trump's presidential pardon, leftover funds donated to a website Flynn's sister Barbara Redgate had set up to pay for Flynn's legal expenses were disbursed to Flynn and two of his sisters. Flynn received "between $250,000 and $1 million", Redgate $265,000, and sister Claire Eckert an undisclosed amount.

Flynn, his brother Joseph, and Overstock.com founder Patrick Byrne founded a nonprofit, The America Project, that paid his son Michael's business $200,000 in consulting fees in 2021 and Joseph's business $150,000 in 2021 and $260,000 in 2022. In 2021, Flynn took control of a largely dormant conservative nonprofit, America's Future, and its leftover assets of $3 million when its board of unpaid volunteers resigned. The nonprofit then started paying Flynn and numerous members of his family and their businesses. In 2022, the nonprofit raised $17,500 in donations and lost $637,000, having to sell off assets and use its savings. It then began to promote the protection of children from sexual abuse and human trafficking by amplifying the conspiracy theory that a global cabal of pedophiles controls the media and politics. Issue One noted how Byrne, who previously told the January 6 committee that the organization did not make money, also profited from America Project, as did the organization chief operations officers Carl Johnson, and Mark Lloyd, director of "Operation Eagles Wings," which trains conservative activists in poll-watching tactics, . Flynn named Ivan Raiklin to the America's Future board in June 2024.

Neither nonprofit disclosed the payments to family members to the IRS; Flynn's lawyer told The New York Times that the nondisclosures were unintentional errors.

The Flynn brothers were no longer affiliated with The America Project by July 2024.

=== 2024 film Flynn ===
Flynn, a film about and starring Flynn, was released in April 2024. Flynn promoted and screened the film on a bus tour to multiple locales through May. A review by Religion News Service characterized the film as hagiographic and said it "poses as a straight-laced documentary but is starkly silent about Flynn's current mission: spreading the gospel of Christian nationalism and preparing his followers to wage spiritual warfare, starting by taking over local politics." The review said Flynn considers his troubles with the "deep state" began in 2010, when he publicly published a report that was critical of military intelligence operations in Afghanistan, and which the film asserts rankled his superiors; the report was actually well-received and endorsed by Defense Secretary Robert Gates, who called it "brilliant," though he was displeased it had been published by a private think tank. The review continued that "the film's goal seems to be to rewrite history and bolster Flynn's credibility as a spiritual leader" and it "mythologizes its subject as a renegade who perseveres against all odds, standing up to malevolent forces in defense of 'the truth.'"

== Investigations after leaving the Trump administration ==
On 14 February 2017, Trump met with FBI Director James Comey in the Oval Office and reportedly told him "I hope you can see your way clear to letting this go, to letting Flynn go", adding "he's a good guy." Comey subsequently testified that, "I had understood the President to be requesting that we drop any investigation of Flynn in connection with false statements about his conversations with the Russian ambassador in December ... I did not understand the president to be talking about the broader investigation into Russia or possible links to his campaign". The propriety, and even the legality, of these words that Trump reportedly said to Comey about Flynn have become a subject of considerable public debate. Several months after dismissing Flynn, Trump also dismissed Comey, which Comey attributed to the FBI's Russia investigation.

Flynn had offered to testify to the FBI or the Senate and House Intelligence committees relating to the Russia probe in exchange for immunity from criminal prosecution. However, the Senate Intelligence Committee rejected Flynn's offer for testimony in exchange for immunity. Flynn initially declined to respond to a subpoena from the Senate Intelligence Committee, invoking his Fifth Amendment right against self-incrimination, but he and the committee later struck a compromise. The Pentagon inspector general was also investigating whether Flynn accepted money from foreign governments without the required approval.

On 5 November 2017, NBC News reported that Robert Mueller had enough evidence for charges against Flynn and his son, Michael G. Flynn. On 10 November, The Wall Street Journal reported that Flynn was under investigation by Mueller for allegedly planning a kidnapping and extrajudicial rendition of Turkish cleric Fethullah Gülen to Turkey. On 22 November, NBC News reported that Flynn's business partner Bijan Kian was a subject of the Mueller probe. NBC reported that a Turkish businessman named Reza Zarrab, who was picked up in 2016 by U.S. authorities in Miami on Iranian sanctions violations and money laundering charges, was offering evidence against Flynn. Flynn's firm was paid more than $500,000 by Inovo, a Netherlands firm owned by Turkish businessman Kamil Ekim Alptekin, for work which included investigating Gülen. In turn Alptekin received $80,000, said to be a kick-back in a report done by Reuters.

On 23 November 2017, it was reported that Flynn's lawyers notified Trump's legal team they could no longer discuss anything regarding Mueller's investigation, suggesting Flynn may have been cooperating with prosecutors or negotiating a deal.

=== Plea bargain, 2017 ===
Statement of the offense provided during United States v. Flynn, 1 December 2017

On 1 December 2017, Flynn and special counsel Robert Mueller agreed to a plea bargain in the District of Columbia's U.S. District Court. In the agreement, Flynn pleaded guilty to "willfully and knowingly" making "false, fictitious and fraudulent statements" to the FBI regarding conversations with Russia's ambassador. Flynn agreed in The Statement of the Offense that he had falsely denied that on 29 December 2016, he had asked Russia's Ambassador to the United States Sergey Kislyak "to refrain from escalating ... in response to sanctions that the United States had imposed against Russia that same day." Flynn's guilty plea acknowledged that he was cooperating with the Mueller investigation, and it was accepted by the court.

=== Sentencing delayed and postponed indefinitely, 2018–2020 ===
Flynn's sentencing had been deferred several times, most recently on 27 November 2019 and 10 February 2020. As part of Flynn's plea negotiations, his son, Michael G. Flynn, was expected to avoid charges.

In a sentencing memorandum released on 4 December 2018, the Mueller investigation stated Flynn "deserves credit for accepting responsibility in a timely fashion and substantially assisting the government" and should receive little or no jail time.

Flynn's attorneys submitted a sentencing memo on 11 December 2018, requesting leniency and suggesting FBI agents had tricked him into lying during the 24 January 2017, White House interview and did not advise him that lying to federal agents is a felony. The memo also asserted that Flynn's relaxed behavior during the interview indicated he was being truthful. Trump echoed this assertion two days later on Twitter and Fox News, asserting, "They convinced him he did lie, and he made some kind of a deal."

Mueller's office rejected these assertions the next day, stating agents had told Flynn portions of what he had discussed with Russian ambassador Sergei Kislyak to jog his memory, but Flynn did not waver from his false statements. FBI agents concluded that Flynn's relaxed behavior during the interview was actually because he was fully committed to his lies. Mueller's office also documented instances when Flynn lied about the Kislyak conversation during the days before the FBI interview. Judge Emmet G. Sullivan ordered documents related to the interview be provided to him prior to Flynn's 18 December 2018 sentencing. The New York Times reported that Flynn's "decision to attack the FBI in his own plea for probation appeared to be a gambit for a pardon from Mr. Trump, whose former lawyer had broached the prospect last year with a lawyer for Mr. Flynn."

Sullivan, who had a history of skepticism about government conduct, rebuked Flynn at his 18 December 2018 sentencing hearing. Citing evidence not released to the public, the judge told him, "arguably you sold your country out", and warned, "I cannot assure that if you proceed today you will not receive a sentence of incarceration." He offered to delay the sentencing until Flynn's cooperation with investigators was complete. After conferring with his attorneys, Flynn accepted the delay. During the hearing, Sullivan indicated he was offended by the suggestion in the sentencing memo submitted by Flynn's attorneys that the FBI had misled Flynn, as it created an appearance that Flynn wanted to accept a generous plea deal from prosecutors while also contending he had been entrapped. He asked several questions of Flynn's attorney, Robert Kelner, to determine if the defense was maintaining that the FBI had acted improperly in its investigation of Flynn, including whether he had been entrapped. Kelner responded, "No, your honor" to each question. Judge Sullivan also asked Flynn multiple questions under oath, including whether he wanted to withdraw his guilty plea, still accepted responsibility for his false statements and wanted to plead guilty, and was satisfied with his legal representation. Flynn restated his guilty plea, and acknowledged to Sullivan he was aware that lying to federal investigators was a crime at the time of his initial FBI interview in January 2017. Sullivan then delayed sentencing.

On 16 May 2019, an unredacted version of a December 2018 government sentencing memo for Flynn showed that he advised investigators that both before and after his guilty plea "he or his attorneys received communications from persons connected to the Administration or Congress that could have affected both his willingness to cooperate and the completeness of that cooperation." The Mueller Report described a November 2017 voicemail Flynn's attorneys received from Trump's "personal counsel", reportedly John Dowd, who said: "[I]f... there's information that implicates the President, then we've got a national security issue ... so, you know ... we need some kind of heads up," reiterating the president's "feelings toward Flynn and, that still remains." The newly unredacted information also showed that members of the Trump campaign discussed contacting WikiLeaks about the release of emails and "potential efforts to interfere with the SCO's investigation." The day the unredacted court filing was released, Sullivan ordered that the full transcript of the voicemail be released to the public by 31 May, as well as the transcript of Flynn's conversation with Kislyak and unredacted portions of the Mueller Report relating to Flynn. The Justice Department released the Dowd transcript on 31 May, but not the Flynn materials.

Dowd denied March 2018 reports by The New York Times and The Washington Post six days after he resigned as Trump's attorney that in 2017 he had broached the idea of a presidential pardon for Flynn with his attorneys.

In June 2019, Flynn fired the Covington & Burling attorneys who had negotiated his plea deal and hired Sidney Powell, who had previously urged Flynn to withdraw his guilty plea. Trump complimented Flynn and Powell on Twitter. Testimony of contractors of the Flynn company in the Bijan Rafiekian trial indicates their foreign customer was interested in classified government information on Turkey's cleric Fethullah Gülen, surveillance of Gülen supporters, and likely terrorist links that might be turned up by their own investigations of the Turkish cleric. Bijan Rafiekian, who was a partner of Michael Flynn in the Flynn Intel Group and worked with the incoming Trump administration's transition team, was charged with illegally acting as an unregistered agent of Turkey. In 2019 a federal judge threw out the guilty verdicts against Bijan Rafiekian, citing insufficient evidence to sustain his conviction on either count.

In August 2019, Flynn's attorneys filed a motion to hold prosecutors in contempt for "malevolent conduct", accusing them of withholding material that benefited his case to cause him to plead guilty. They alleged that parts of the federal government had attempted to "smear" him as a Russian agent, "or the victim of a criminal leak or other abuses related to classified intercepts of his calls with Kislyak". In October 2019, Flynn's lawyers further alleged in court filings that "high-ranking FBI officials orchestrated an ambush-interview ... not for the purpose of discovering any evidence of criminal activity ... but for the purpose of trapping him into making statements they could allege as false."

On 16 December 2019, after a review of possible case related findings in the Michael Horowitz report, Sullivan rejected the assertions of FBI entrapment and prosecutorial malfeasance, setting his sentencing date for 28 January 2020. Sullivan asked prosecutors to present a new sentencing memo; they had previously recommended little or no jail time, but more recently suggested they might change their position. On 7 January 2020, prosecutors presented a sentencing memo calling for Flynn to be sentenced to a term of up to six months. One week later, Flynn's lawyers filed a motion seeking permission to withdraw his guilty plea "because of the government's bad faith, vindictiveness, and breach of the plea agreement". On January 16, Sullivan postponed Flynn's sentencing date to 27 February. On 22 January, Flynn requested he be sentenced to probation and community service if his request to withdraw his guilty plea is not granted. On 29 January 2020, Flynn filed a personal declaration with the court, declaring under penalty of perjury that he was innocent, that he still didn't remember whether he had discussed sanctions with Kislyak or the details of their discussion of the United Nations vote on Israel, that his Covington attorneys had not provided effective counsel, and that he "did not consciously or intentionally lie" to the FBI agents who had interviewed him. After senior Justice Department officials intervened in February 2020 to recommend a lighter sentence for Roger Stone than prosecutors had recommended the day before, NBC News reported that the previous month senior DOJ officials had also intervened to recommend Flynn's sentence be reduced from up to six months in the original recommendation to probation.

Days before Flynn's scheduled sentencing, attorney general William Barr appointed Jeffrey Jensen, the U.S. attorney for the United States District Court for the Eastern District of Missouri, to examine Flynn's prosecution. On 10 February 2020, Flynn's sentencing was postponed indefinitely, to allow both sides to prepare arguments in response to his claim that his previous lawyers violated his constitutional rights by providing inadequate legal counsel.

=== Justice Department's motion to drop charges, Presidential pardon 2020 ===
Department of Justice dismissal of the criminal information filed against Flynn, 7 May 2020

In February 2020, Attorney General William Barr declared that there would be a review of Flynn's case. Barr chose Jeffrey Jensen, the sitting US Attorney for the Eastern District of Missouri since 2017, to conduct the review. Jensen had been nominated to his position by President Trump. Trump had publicly called for Flynn's charges to be dropped. In late April or early May, Jensen recommended to Barr that the charges be dropped, and Barr agreed with the recommendation.

On 7 May 2020, the Department of Justice (DOJ) filed a Motion to Dismiss with prejudice the criminal information against Flynn. The motion, filed by Timothy Shea, interim United States Attorney for the District of Columbia and a longtime adviser of Barr's, stated that Flynn's questioning "was untethered to, and unjustified by, the FBI's counterintelligence investigation". Lead DOJ prosecutor Brandon L. Van Grack withdrew from the case, and no DOJ attorneys who had been involved in the case signed on to Shea's motion. Van Grack had contended in previous filings that the "topics of sanctions went to the heart of the FBI's counterintelligence investigation, [and] any effort to undermine those sanctions could have been evidence of links or coordination between the Trump campaign and Russia." Sidney Powell, Flynn's attorney, said prosecution filings had been made in "bad faith", and Brady materials had been withheld. U.S. District Judge Emmet G. Sullivan had previously ruled that Flynn's statements were material to the Russia campaign interference inquiry. It was left to Sullivan to determine whether to dismiss the charges and also to prevent a retrial on the charges. Sullivan had the option of requesting written submissions on the motion and also could determine if additional Brady disclosure materials that should have been provided to the defense could be added to the record.

On 12 May 2020, Judge Sullivan ordered a hold on the DOJ's intent to drop charges, saying he expected that independent groups and legal experts will wish to intervene. Judge Sullivan said he will set schedules for filing "friend-of-the court" or amicus briefs. On 13 May, Judge Sullivan appointed retired U.S. District Judge John Gleeson to act as an amicus curiae "to present arguments in opposition to the government's Motion to Dismiss" and to "address whether the Court should issue an Order to Show Cause why Mr. Flynn should not be held in criminal contempt for perjury." On 19 May, Judge Sullivan set a schedule for amicus briefs (to be submitted no later than 10 June 2020), replies (with various dates in June 2020), and oral arguments (on 16 July 2020). On 10 June, Judge Gleeson filed his amicus brief stating that the government's motion be denied as "the Government's statement of reasons for seeking dismissal is pretextual" and "there is clear evidence of a gross abuse of prosecutorial power" and concluding that "Flynn has indeed committed perjury in these proceedings" that should be taken into account in his sentencing. On 17 June, the DOJ filed a brief with Sullivan asserting that even if Gleeson's findings of gross abuse were true, the department still had sole authority to drop the case without judicial review. A footnote in the brief stated that assertions of prosecutorial misconduct made by Flynn's attorney, Sidney Powell, were "unfounded and provide no basis for impugning the prosecutors."

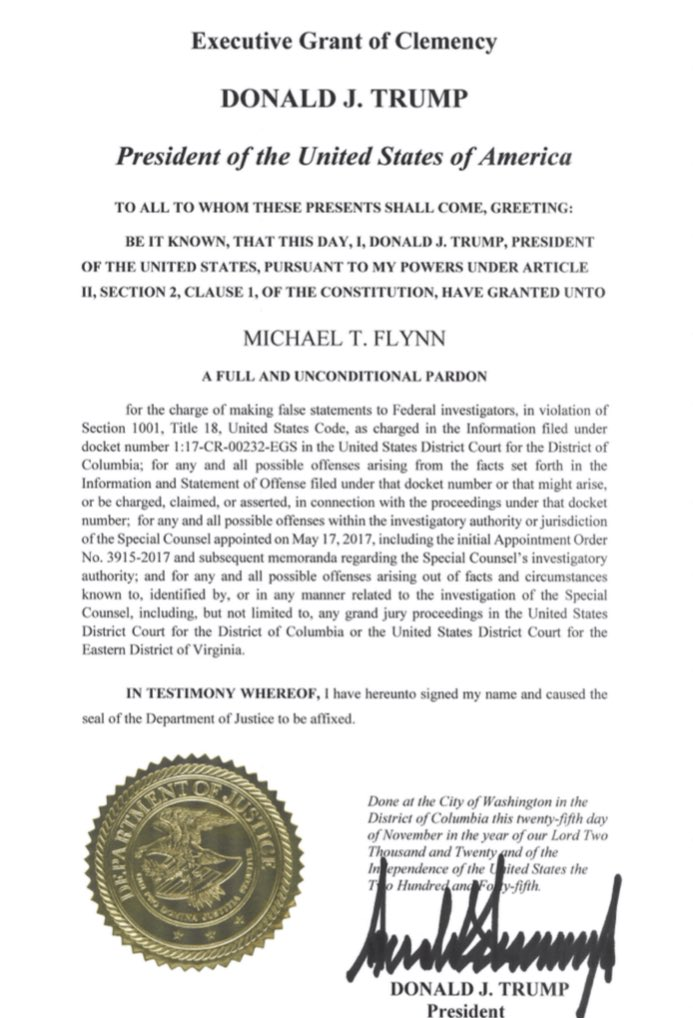
Full pardon issued on behalf of Flynn by Donald Trump on 25 November 2020

On 19 May 2020, Flynn filed an Emergency Petition for a Writ of Mandamus in the United States Court of Appeals for the District of Columbia Circuit requesting a writ ordering the district court to (1) grant the government's Motion to Dismiss with prejudice, (2) vacate its order appointing an amicus curiae, and (3) assign the case to another judge for any additional proceedings. On 21 May, the panel ordered Judge Sullivan to file a response addressing Flynn's request within ten days of the order and also invited the Department of Justice to respond. In response to the order, Judge Sullivan retained Beth Wilkinson to help with his response. On 1 June, Judge Sullivan and the Department of Justice filed responsive briefs with the appellate court panel. On 10 June, Flynn, the Department of Justice, and Judge Sullivan filed reply briefs. On 12 June, oral arguments were heard by the appellate court panel by teleconference. On 24 June, the appellate court panel ruled to grant the writ, "direct[ing] the district court to grant the government's Rule 48(a) motion to dismiss ... [and] vacat[ing] the district court's order appointing an amicus as moot," with Judge Neomi Rao writing for the majority, joined by Judge Karen Henderson, and Judge Robert L. Wilkins dissenting in part. On 9 July, Sullivan filed a petition with the full appellate court to rehear the case. On 30 July, the full court agreed to hear the case, vacating the 24 June ruling, scheduling oral arguments for 11 August, and advising the parties to "be prepared to address whether there are 'no other adequate means to attain the relief' desired." On 11 August, the full appeals court heard arguments from the DOJ and from Sullivan's attorney. The appeals court ruled 8–2 on 31 August 2020, to deny the request to dismiss the case or reassign the case from Sullivan.

More oral arguments took place on 29 September 2020, conducted remotely due to the COVID-19 pandemic in the United States. Flynn received a presidential pardon on 25 November 2020. Judge Sullivan subsequently dismissed the criminal case against Flynn as moot on 8 December 2020.

In a 2023 lawsuit, Flynn sought at least $50 million from the Justice Department, arguing that the prosecution had been malicious. In March 2026, the Justice Department settled with him for about $1.2 million.

== Political views ==
Amid speculation that Flynn might be selected as Trump's 2016 running mate, he discussed his registration as a Democrat, stating "I grew up as a Democrat in a very strong Democratic family, but I will tell you that Democratic Party that exists in this country is not the Democratic Party that I grew up around in my upbringing", and declined to say whether his affiliation had changed. He was a headlining speaker during the first night of the 2016 Republican National Convention, and he was a surrogate and top national security adviser for President Donald Trump.

During a July 10, 2016 interview on ABC News' This Week, when asked by host Martha Raddatz about the issue of abortion, Flynn said, "women have to be able to choose". The next day, Flynn said on Fox News that he is a "pro-life Democrat".

Flynn is an opponent of the 2015 Iran nuclear deal, and has expressed support for Israeli policies. In February 2017, Flynn said "the Obama administration failed to respond adequately to Tehran's malign actions—including weapons transfers, support for terrorism and other violations of international norms". Flynn accused Yemen's Houthi rebels of being one of Iran's "proxy terrorist groups" in February 2017. Flynn also criticized Obama's administration for arming Syrian rebels linked to Salafi jihadism. According to Flynn, the U.S. is "at war with a radical component of Islam". Flynn has been a board member of the anti-Muslim ACT! for America, and local chapters of ACT organized large parts of the speaking tour for Flynn's book. He sees the Muslim faith as one of the root causes of Islamist terrorism, which along with other views has seen him associated with the counter-jihad movement, of which he was considered the "leading advocate" at the Trump White House.

Flynn has described Islam as a political ideology that "definitely hides behind being a religion" and has metastasized into a "malignant cancer." He once tweeted that "fear of Muslims is RATIONAL" and included a video link claiming that Islam wants "80% of people enslaved or exterminated". Initially supportive of Trump's proposal to ban Muslims from entering the U.S., Flynn later told Al Jazeera a blanket ban was unworkable and has called instead for "vetting" of entrants from countries like Syria. Flynn has said the U.S. "should extradite Fethullah Gülen" to Turkey and "work constructively with Russia" in Syria. In 2016, he said he had seen photos of signs in the Southwest border area that were in Arabic to help Muslims entering the United States illegally. Shawn Moran, a vice president of the National Border Patrol Council responded to CNN that the group National Border Patrol Council was not aware of the signs Flynn referenced, but they were concerned about the threat of terrorism at the southern border.

Flynn was a scheduled speaker for a "Digital Soldiers Conference" in Atlanta in September 2019, along with other Trump associates George Papadopoulos and Gina Loudon. The conference was named after a 2016 quote from Flynn about Trump having been elected by an "army of digital soldiers". The stated purpose was to prepare "patriotic social media warriors" for a coming "digital civil war." The announcement for the event prominently displayed a Q spelled in stars on the blue field of an American flag, and the host of the event had numerous references to QAnon on his Twitter account. On Independence Day 2020, Flynn tweeted a video of himself leading others repeating a pledge commonly associated with QAnon Flynn's attorney, Sidney Powell, denied the oath related to QAnon, saying it was merely a statement engraved on a bell on John F. Kennedy's sailboat. However, during preceding days numerous QAnon followers had taken the same so-called "digital soldier oath" on Twitter, using the same #TakeTheOath hashtag as Flynn had.

Following his November 2020 pardon, Flynn deepened his involvement with QAnon by endorsing merchandise related to the conspiracy theory, creating a Digital Soldiers media company, and announcing that he planned to launch a news media outlet also called "Digital soldiers". As Flynn appeared on podcasts popular with QAnon followers such as "Bards of War," QAnon stories predicted that he would help them take control, some adherents even speculating that Flynn was Q.

=== 2020 election ===
Days after being pardoned by Trump, Flynn tweeted a press release by the "We the People Convention" that called on the president to "exercise the Extraordinary Powers of his office and declare limited Martial Law to temporarily suspend the Constitution and civilian control of these federal elections in order to have the military implement a national re-vote that reflects the true will of the people."

On 17 December 2020, Flynn stated during a television interview, "People out there talk about martial law like it's something that we've never done. Martial law has been instituted 64 times." Although martial law had been imposed 68 times in the nation's history, only one sitting president had invoked it — Abraham Lincoln during the Civil War. None of the invocations of martial law involved electoral issues as Flynn envisioned. In January 2022, a draft executive order dated 16 December 2020, surfaced that proposed a military seizure of voting machines and the appointment of a special counsel to investigate the election, as the president and his allies sought ways to overturn the election which he had lost. In a 18 December Oval Office meeting Flynn attended, Sidney Powell urged Trump to seize voting machines and to appoint her as a special counsel, though it was not immediately clear who wrote the draft order.

Flynn appeared at a Stop the Steal rally in Washington, D.C. in December following the decision by the U.S. Supreme Court not to hear Texas v. Pennsylvania. He dismissed the court's decision saying "the people decide" who will be president, saying, "I will tell you one more time—because I've been asked—on a scale of one to ten, who will be the next president of the United States, and I say Donald Trump. Ten. A ten". Flynn likened the protesters at Stop the Steal events to the biblical soldiers and priests breaching the walls of Jericho in the Battle of Jericho, echoing the rally organizers' call for "Jericho Marches" to overturn the election result. After the meeting, the largest Three Percenters group announced that they were "ready to enter into battle with General Flynn leading the charge".

Not long afterward, Flynn and Powell met with Trump in the Oval Office, where they reportedly railed on White House Chief of Staff Mark Meadows and White House Counsel Pat Cipollone and accused them of abandoning the president post-election.

=== Post-election, 2021 ===
On 8 January 2021, two days after the storming of the Capitol, Flynn's Twitter account was permanently suspended, along with those of many other QAnon-affiliated personalities such as Sidney Powell. A Twitter representative said the accounts of Flynn and others had "been suspended in line with our policy on Coordinated Harmful Activity". Flynn's Twitter account was reinstated on the second anniversary of the January 6 attack, roughly two months after the company had been acquired by Elon Musk.

In February 2021, Flynn distanced himself from QAnon views, stating that rumors about Trump using the Insurrection Act to take back control of the country were "nonsense", and commenting: "There's no plan. There's so many people out there asking, 'Is the plan happening?' We have what we have, and we have to accept the situation as it is." However, he did not disavow QAnon outright, nor did he admit that Biden's win was legitimate.

Media Matters published analysis in February 2021 finding that QAnon adherents had praised the February 2021 Myanmar coup d'état in which the military overthrew the democratically elected government, and advocated a similar coup in the United States. In May 2021, Flynn was one of the keynote speakers at the "For God & Country: Patriot Roundup" conference, organized in Dallas by QAnon activists. When an audience member stated, "I want to know why what happened in Myanmar can't happen here," Flynn responded, "No reason, I mean, it should happen here. No reason. That's right." After his words were reported, Flynn asserted he had "not at any time called for any action of that sort" and accused the press of "boldface fabrication based on twisted reporting."

In May 2021, Flynn asserted the COVID-19 pandemic was fabricated as "a distraction to what happened on 3 November," referring to the 2020 presidential election which he maintains was stolen from Trump. He added, "Everything we hear about Covid, and how Covid started before 3 November, it is all meant to control, it is all meant to gain control of a society to be able to force decisions on society, instead of allowing 'we the people' to make decisions." Flynn falsely suggested that getting the COVID-19 vaccine was required to get an identification card or to travel. He later alleged George Soros, Bill Gates and others had created COVID-19 to "steal an election" and "rule the world."

Flynn became active on speaking tours in 2021, including the ReAwaken America Tour which Flynn helped launch. Will Sommer of The Daily Beast observed that a prayer Flynn gave in September bore a striking resemblance to one by Elizabeth Clare Prophet, leader of the Church Universal and Triumphant, an anti-communist doomsday cult. Some QAnon supporters alleged the prayer was Satanic because Flynn used terms they considered antithetical to Christian doctrine.

The ReAwaken America Tour is sponsored by Charisma News, a proponent of the New Apostolic Reformation.

While speaking before a ReAwaken America audience in November 2021, Flynn stated: "If we are going to have one nation under God, which we must, we have to have one religion. One nation under God, and one religion under God," a statement that caused outrage.

In December 2021, lawyer and QAnon follower L. Lin Wood leaked a text exchange and a phone conversation between himself and Flynn, in which Flynn commented that QAnon was "a set up and a disinformation campaign to make people look like a bunch of kooks" and accused "the Left" or the CIA of being behind the campaign.

Reuters reported in December 2021 that Flynn and associated military-intelligence veterans played a central role in spreading false information alleging the 2020 election had been stolen from Trump. Phil Waldron, a psychological operations expert, said he worked with Flynn on secret projects during the Iraq and Afghanistan wars, and worked in clandestine services under Flynn at the Defense Intelligence Agency. Waldron had distributed a 38-page PowerPoint presentation detailing an elaborate theory that China and Venezuela had taken control of voting machines — a theory also promoted by Trump and Flynn attorney Sidney Powell. Waldron said he had conveyed his theory to congressman Louie Gohmert who immediately called Trump. Waldron soon met with Powell and Rudy Giuliani before attending a meeting with Trump in the Oval Office. Waldron said he spoke with Trump chief of staff Mark Meadows several times and discussed his theory with several members of Congress. The presentation recommended that Trump declare a national security emergency to delay the January 6 certification of electors, reject all ballots cast by machine, and have paper ballots secured by U.S. marshals and National Guard troops to conduct a recount.

Flynn also worked with Ivan Raiklin, a former special forces officer who presented himself as a constitutional attorney, though Reuters could not find evidence he had such expertise. Raiklin promoted conspiracy theories involving Pence, intelligence agencies, big tech, China and the postal service. On 22 December, he tweeted to Trump a two-page memo entitled, "Operation Pence Card," describing how the vice president might reject electors from states Biden won and in which Trump falsely alleged fraud. Trump retweeted the Raiklin tweet. Seth Keshel, a former Army intelligence officer, conducted a statistical analysis that falsely claimed to prove the 2020 election results were fraudulent; he told Reuters he contacted Flynn and they began collaborating. Shortly after the election, Flynn, Powell, Keshel and others gathered for days of strategy sessions at the South Carolina estate of Lin Wood. Also present was Doug Logan, the CEO of Cyber Ninjas, which managed the controversial election audit in Maricopa County, Arizona after Waldron recommended him to Arizona Senate president Karen Fann. A Flynn fundraising organization provided most of the $5.7 million funding for that audit, which ultimately affirmed Biden's victory in Arizona without proving fraud.

Flynn was subpoenaed for testimony and documents by the House Select Committee on the January 6 Attack in November 2021; he appeared before the committee in March 2022 but repeatedly exercised his Fifth Amendment right to not answer questions.

As of September 2022, Flynn is continuing to consolidate right wing, conservative Christian groups to influence elections. Among the groups are also election deniers, mask and vaccine opponents, insurrectionists and Proud Boys. With his brother Joe, and Patrick Byrne, Flynn co-founded The America Project, which advocates for what it contends is "election integrity" by poll watching and voter challenges, producing manuals for nine states. One of the several Arizona Senators who worked closely with Flynn to conduct the Arizona Audit, Steve Montenegro, was named the National Policy Director of the America Project and managed the audit Twitter feed. The America Project funds another organization, One More Mission, which seeks to recruit thousands of military veterans and police officers to work at polls for the 2022 United States elections. After having resided in Englewood, Florida since 2021, in September 2022, Flynn joined the executive committee of the Sarasota County, Florida Republican Committee. In the county committee's December 2022 leadership elections, Flynn backed an unsuccessful candidate for chair.

=== Since 2022 ===
Flynn testified under subpoena before a 2020 Georgia election investigation special grand jury in December 2022. The grand jury indicted 19 people on racketeering charges in August 2023, including former president Trump. The grand jury recommended that the prosecutor, Fani Willis, also indict Flynn and 38 others, but she declined.

In March 2023, Flynn endorsed an antisemitic conspiracy theory video claiming that President John F. Kennedy had warned about a "Khazarian mafia" that secretly controls the world, a reference to the Khazar hypothesis of Jewish ancestry. In August 2023, the Auschwitz Memorial condemned Flynn after he suggested that Jewish parents willingly surrendered their children to the Nazis during the Holocaust.

In May 2023, Trump, who was actively campaigning for president, called into a ReAwaken America event Flynn was hosting at Trump National Doral Miami. He told Flynn, "We're going to bring you back," adding, "We're proud of you, general. I knew it from day one — you're really somebody very special." It was not clear if Trump was specifically referring to a role for Flynn in the Trump administration if he were elected in 2024.

The Rhode Island Heritage Hall of Fame in December 2023 nominated Flynn for induction in 2024. Several Hall of Fame board members quickly resigned in protest.

Media Matters reported in January 2024 that days earlier Flynn had appeared in-studio with Alex Jones to say, "I told Alex a couple of years ago when we met that I had first seen him in 2008 and 2009. I said, 'That guy's absolutely right on the money.'" Jones asserted that government-aligned groups are "going to stage false flags — unless we expose them and stop them — to blame us and trigger this. And they're going to make moves that they believe will elicit a civil war. This isn't coming. It's here. They are going to try this." Flynn responded:

I don't raise my voice that much, but when I do, it means that we are moving to — as Alex just said — we're moving towards the sound of the guns here, folks. And the sound of the guns is freedom. We are going to move towards freedom.

Flynn addressed an October 2024 Rod of Iron Ministries Freedom Festival, saying that if Donald Trump won the 2024 presidential election, "Katie, bar the door. Believe me, the gates of hell — my hell — will be unleashed." Flynn's close associate Ivan Raiklin urged attendees to "confront" their state representatives with "evidence of the illegitimate steal" should Trump lose. Raiklin had previously characterized himself as Trump's "Secretary of Retribution" and said he had a prepared a "Deep State Target List' of over 350 people he would go after in a second Trump administration. The Southern Poverty Law Center characterizes the Rod of Iron Ministries as an "antigovernment Christian gun cult."

== Personal life ==
Flynn married Lori Andrade in 1981. They have two children together, Michael Flynn Jr. and Matt Flynn. In 2021, Flynn moved to Sarasota County. He has been visiting and donating money to The Hollow in Venice, Florida, a far right meeting place including the Proud Boys.

== Writings ==
Flynn co-authored a report in January 2010 through the Center for a New American Security, entitled Fixing Intel: A Blueprint for Making Intelligence Relevant in Afghanistan. That report, which became influential, argued that U.S. intelligence agencies "must open their doors to anyone who is willing to exchange information, including Afghans and NGOs [non-governmental organizations] as well as the U.S. military and its allies".

Flynn is a co- author of The Field of Fight: How We Can Win the Global War Against Radical Islam and Its Allies with Michael Ledeen, which was published by St. Martin's Press in 2016. In reviewing the book, Will McCants of the Brookings Institution described Flynn's worldview as a confused combination of neoconservatism (an insistence on destroying what he sees as an alliance of tyranny, dictatorships, and radical Islamist regimes) and realism (support for working with "friendly tyrants"), although he acknowledged that this could be due to the book's having two authors.

Flynn co-authored the book The Citizen's Guide to Fifth Generation Warfare, published in December 2022. Flynn writes that social media platforms are powerful weapons that are being used against the public by state and non-state actors as "a global PSYOP agenda to consolidate power using digital platforms to affect everyone on macro and micro levels."

== Awards and decorations ==
Flynn's decorations, medals and badges include:

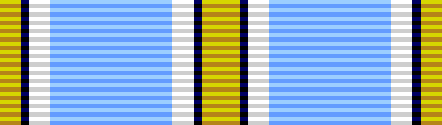

Badge	Master Parachutist Badge			
1st row	Defense Distinguished Service Medal			
2nd row	Defense Superior Service Medal with three bronze oak leaf clusters	Legion of Merit with one bronze oak leaf cluster	Bronze Star Medal with three bronze oak leaf clusters	Meritorious Service Medal with one silver oak leaf cluster
3rd row	Joint Service Commendation Medal	Army Commendation Medal with four bronze oak leaf clusters	Army Achievement Medal with one bronze oak leaf cluster	National Intelligence Distinguished Service Medal
4th row	USCG Distinguished Public Service Award	Joint Meritorious Unit Award with oak leaf cluster	National Defense Service Medal with one bronze service star	Armed Forces Expeditionary Medal with four bronze service stars
5th row	Afghanistan Campaign Medal	Iraq Campaign Medal with three bronze service stars	Global War on Terrorism Expeditionary Medal	Global War on Terrorism Service Medal
6th row	Humanitarian Service Medal	Army Service Ribbon	Overseas Service Ribbon	NATO Medal
Badge	Ranger tab			
Badge	Office of the Joint Chiefs of Staff Identification Badge			

Other U.S. agency decorations
U.S. Intelligence Community's Gold Seal Medallion
Defense Intelligence Agency Badge
United States Special Operations Command Combat Service Identification Badge
Army Military Intelligence Corps Distinctive Unit Insignia
? Overseas Service Bars

== Other awards and recognitions ==
- The Ellis Island Medal of Honor
- The 2012 Association of Special Operations Professionals Man of the Year award
- Honorary doctorate from The Institute of World Politics
- The William J. Casey Medal of Honor from the Institute of World Politics
- The Director of Naval Intelligence's Rear Admiral Edwin T. Layton Award for Leadership and Mentorship (first non-Navy recipient)
- Federal Law Enforcement Foundation's Service to America Award
- Honorary Doctorate of Humane Letters, University of Rhode Island, 2014 (revoked January 2022)

== See also ==
- Foreign electoral intervention
- Timeline of Russian interference in the 2016 United States elections
- Timeline of post-election transition following Russian interference in the 2016 United States elections
- Timeline of investigations into Trump and Russia (January–June 2017)
- ReAwaken America Tour

Government offices
Preceded by Ronald Burgess	Director of the Defense Intelligence Agency; 2012–2014	Succeeded by David Shedd; Acting
Political offices
Preceded by Susan Rice	United States National Security Advisor; 2017	Succeeded by Keith Kellogg; Acting
