= Belmont Hill School =

Prep school in Belmont, Massachusetts, US

Coordinates: 42.4073°N 71.1798°W

Location
- 350 Prospect Street; Belmont, Massachusetts 02478; United States

Information
- Type: Private, college-prep, day and boarding
- Motto: Providentia, Studium, Fidelitas (Foresight, Zeal, Loyalty)
- Established: 1923
- Head teacher: Gregory J. Schneider
- Grades: 7–12
- Gender: Boys
- Enrollment: 471
- Campus: Suburban, 37 acres (0.15 km^{2})
- Colors: Maroon, Navy, White
- Athletics: 16 sports (58 teams)
- Athletics conference: ISL, NEPSAC, NEIRA
- Mascot: Sextant
- Endowment: $133 million (2021–22)
- Website: belmonthill.org

Belmont Hill School is an all-boys day and optional five-day boarding school in Belmont, Massachusetts, a suburb of Boston. The school enrolls approximately 470 boys in grades 7–12, separated into the Middle School (Forms I-III, or grades 7–9) and the Upper School (Forms IV-VI, or grades 10–12).

== History ==
The school was founded in 1923 by a group of seven incorporators, including William H. Claflin Jr. and John W. Hallowell, who wanted their sons to attend a nearby day school. (At the time, most of the major Boston day schools were to the south of Boston.) They appointed Middlesex School master Reginald Heber Howe as its first headmaster. The school opened its doors in the fall of 1923 to 43 boys and four faculty, and grew rapidly, reaching 123 boys and 12 full-time faculty by 1926. Howe initially intended to educate students in grades 3–12, but the school eliminated the lower grades over time and adopted the current six-year structure in 1961. Author Munro Leaf taught at the school in the 1920s.

Belmont Hill has been an all-boys school since its founding, although its articles of incorporation originally envisioned "a Country Day School for the education of boys and/or girls." In 1973, the school adopted a sister-school relationship with Winsor School; the two schools share various extracurricular activities. The school also holds joint social events with Dana Hall School and Newton Country Day School.

The school was hit hard by the financial turmoil of the Great Depression, and enrollment fell to 96 by 1942. The trustees tabled several proposals to merge with Rivers and Browne & Nichols in the 1940s, all of which proved unsuccessful. America's entry into World War II, and the resulting increase in government spending, helped revive the school's fortunes. Under headmaster Charles F. Hamilton (h. 1942–71), enrollment and Upper School day student tuition nearly quadrupled. In 1970, the school's scholarship budget was $50,800, roughly equivalent to 22 full scholarships (6% of the student body).

The school celebrated its centennial in 2023, paired with a fundraising campaign that seeks to raise $100–125 million. The campus currently occupies 37 acres.

== Admissions and student body ==
In the 2023–24 school year, Belmont Hill educated 471 boys, 28% of whom were on financial aid. The school maintains a small five-day boarding program for up to 27 local students who commute home on weekends. It previously operated a traditional seven-day boarding program from 1923 to 1966.

In the 2021–22 school year, the school reported that of its 463 students, 331 (71.5%) were white, 39 (8.4%) were multiracial, 35 (7.6%) were Asian, 32 (6.9%) were black, 25 (5.4%) were Hispanic, and 1 (0.2%) was Native Hawaiian/Pacific Islander.

In 2023, the school admitted 30% of applicants. Most students enter in grades 7 and 9 (50 and 20 students, respectively).

== Finances ==
=== Tuition and financial aid ===
In the 2023–24 school year, Belmont Hill charged boarding students $70,050 and day students $61,400.

Belmont Hill provides need-based financial aid and commits to meet 100% of each admitted student's demonstrated financial aid. In the 2023–24 school year, 28% of students were on financial aid, and the average financial aid grant was $48,800 (79% of day student tuition). A majority of financial aid students had household incomes between $50,000 and $200,000, and a plurality of financial aid students had household incomes between $150,000 and $200,000.

=== Endowment and expenses ===
Belmont Hill's financial endowment stood at $133 million as of the 2021–22 school year. In its Internal Revenue Service filings for the 2021–22 school year, Belmont Hill reported total assets of $216.7 million, net assets of $175.9 million, investment holdings of $131.4 million, and cash holdings of $18.3 million. Belmont Hill also reported $27.7 million in program service expenses and $6.1 million in grants (primarily student financial aid).

== Athletics ==
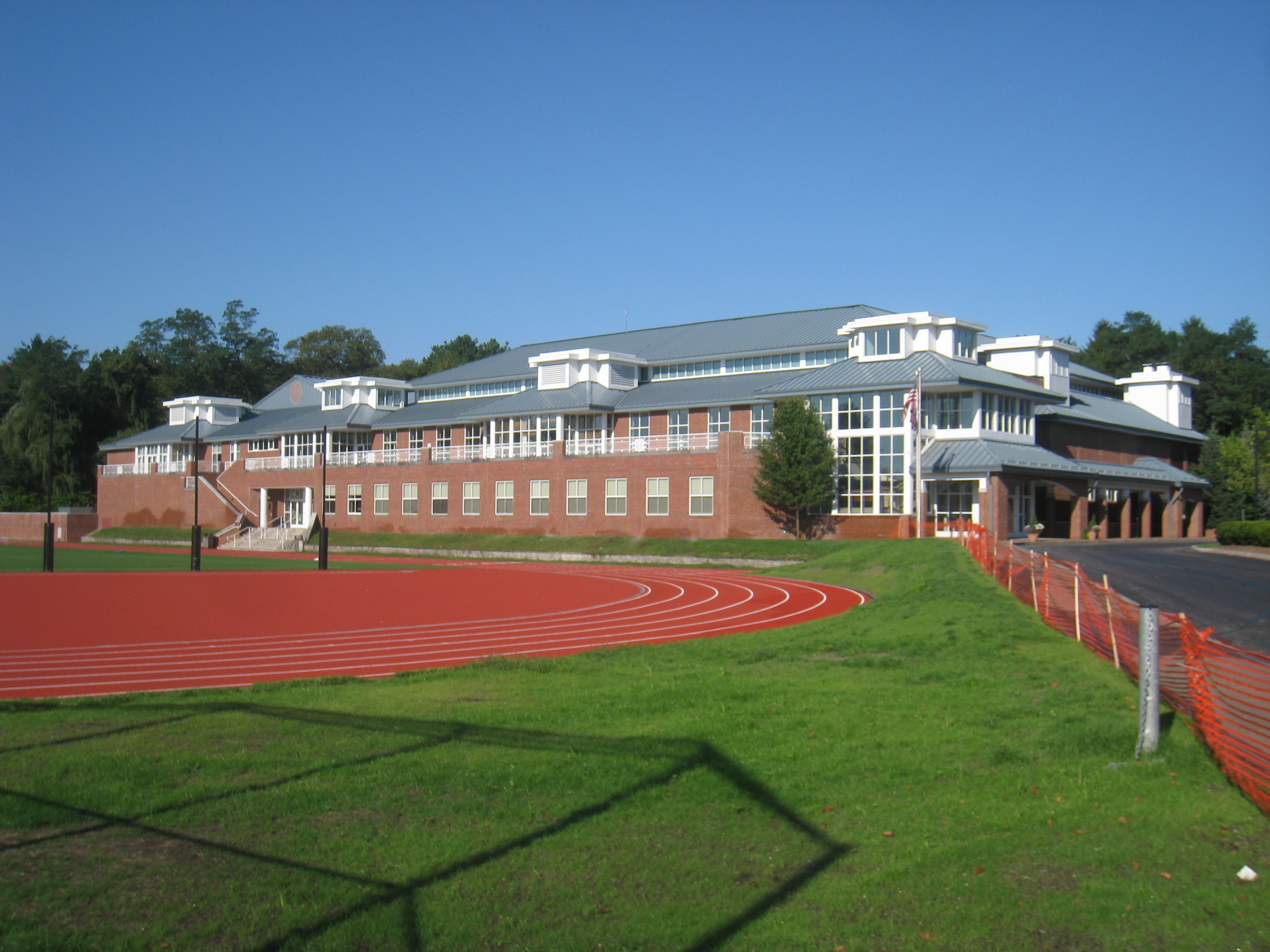
Jordan Athletic Center

Belmont Hill has valued athletics since the school opened in 1923. Reginald Howe had previously coached the Harvard varsity crew, and he "employed as faculty young men, often just out of college, who had distinguished themselves athletically as well as academically." As of the 2020 Tokyo Olympics, the school has educated 16 Olympians, including hockey gold medalists Bill and Bob Cleary.

Today, Belmont Hill offers 16 interscholastic sports and 58 teams, and claims that "virtually all teachers are coaches." The Jordan Athletic Center, opened in 2000, contains two basketball courts, a wrestling room, seven squash courts, a free weights and workout facility, and an Olympic-size hockey rink that converts into four tennis courts. The school also has three baseball fields, a grass soccer field, and two artificial turf fields used for football, lacrosse, and soccer.

Belmont Hill's athletic teams compete in the Independent School League, a group of day and boarding schools in Greater Boston.

=== Sports and achievements ===
Team	Term	Championships	Source
Football	Fall	5 New England; 13 ISL	
Soccer	Fall	2 ISL	
Cross Country	Fall	2 ISL	
Ice Hockey	Winter	2 New England; 30 ISL	
Basketball	Winter		
Wrestling	Winter	6 New England; 19 ISL	
Squash	Winter	3 New England; 19 ISL	
Skiing (Alpine)	Winter	2 New England; 17 ISL	
Skiing (Nordic)	Winter	2 Lakes Region League	
Baseball	Spring	17 ISL	
Lacrosse	Spring	15 ISL	
Crew	Spring	1 Henley Royal Regatta; 5 National; 14 New England	
Track and Field	Spring	14 New England; 14 ISL	
Tennis	Spring	17 ISL	
Golf	Spring	16 ISL	
Sailing	Spring	1 Massachusetts	

=== Notable athletes ===
==== Hockey ====
- Connor Brickley
- Bill Cleary, 1960 Olympic gold medalist; national championship-winning head coach at Harvard
- Bob Cleary, 1960 Olympic gold medalist
- Mike Condon
- Mark Fusco, 1983 Hobey Baker Award winner
- Scott Fusco, 1986 Hobey Baker Award winner
- Matt Grzelcyk
- Paul Mara
- Ian Moran
- Christian Ruuttu
- Jimmy Vesey, 2016 Hobey Baker Award winner
- Chris Kelleher
- David Jensen, 1984 Olympian
- C.J. Young, 1984 Olympian
- Teddy Stiga

==== Rowing ====
- Dara Alizadeh, 2020 Olympian (Team Bermuda)
- Tom Darling, 1980, 1984, and 1988 Olympian; 1984 Olympic silver medalist
- Michael DiSanto, 2016 Olympian
- Stewart MacDonald, 1968 and 1972 Olympian; 1984 Olympic silver medalist (coach)
- Ted Murphy, 2000 Olympic silver medalist
- Andrew Reed, 2020 Olympian
- Alexander Richards, 2020 Olympian
- David Weinberg, 1976 Olympian

==== Other ====
- John Allis (cycling), 1964, 1968, and 1972 Olympian
- Jake Bobo (American football)
- Jay Civetti (American football)
- Toby Kimball (basketball)
- Ben Wanger (baseball), 2020 Olympian (Team Israel)
- Richard Jarvis (American football)
- Eric Johnson (American football)

== Arts ==
The studio arts program covers drawing, painting, woodworking, digital photography, ceramics, mechanical drawing (architecture), and print development.

The music program includes jazz and rock bands, an orchestra, and multiple singing groups. Students may take classes and lessons at the Berklee College of Music in Boston.

The theater program puts five productions a year in collaboration with the Winsor School and/or Dana Hall School.

== Extracurricular activities ==
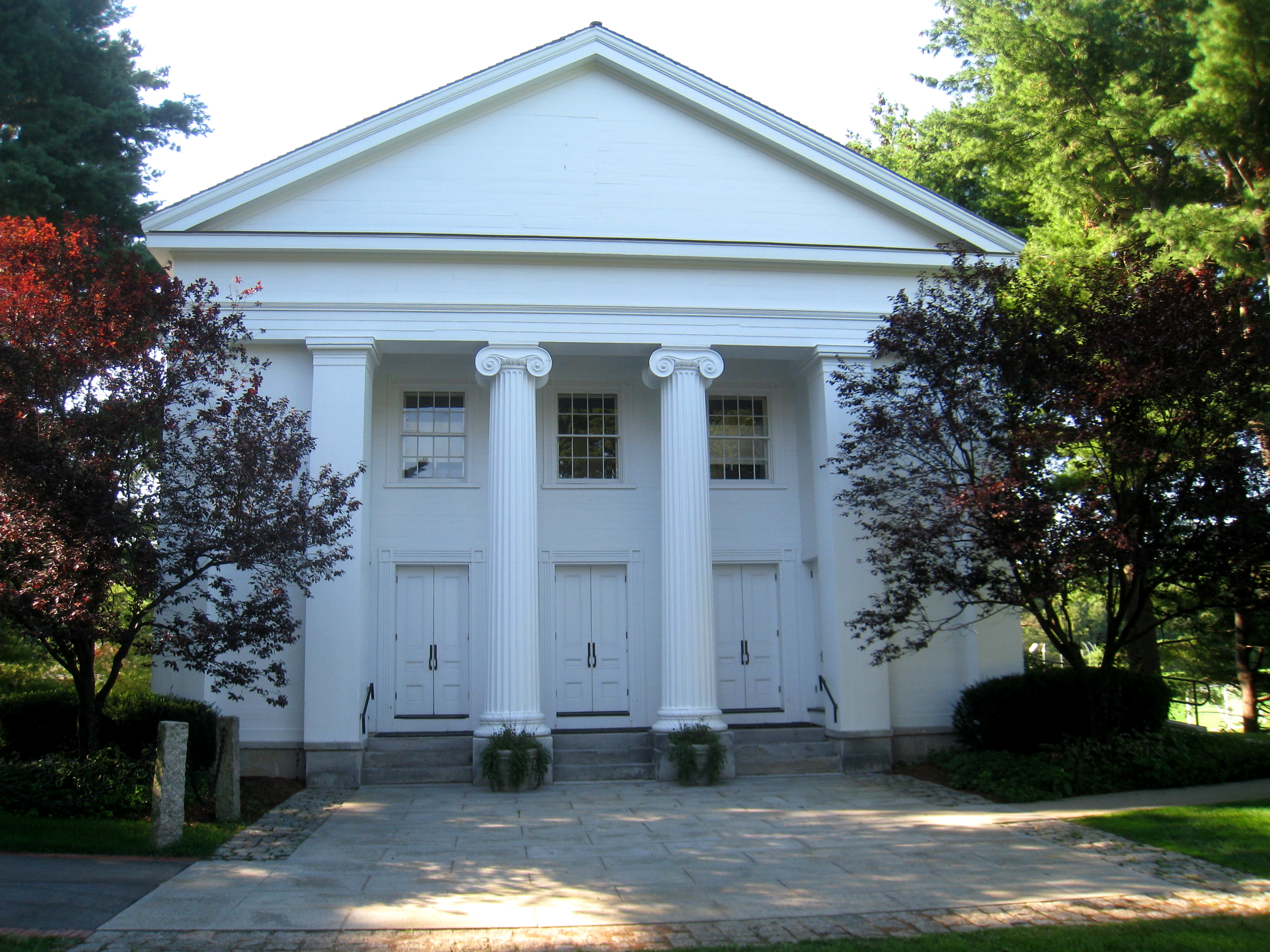
Hamilton Chapel

Belmont Hill's student-run extracurricular organizations include a debate team, school newspaper (The Hill for the Middle School, The Panel for the Upper School), yearbook (The Sundial), and social sciences magazine (The Podium). Every other edition of The Panel is co-produced with Winsor students.

Over 70% of the student body participates in voluntary clubs and service trips for community service. The school holds an annual week-long spring break trip to different regions throughout the United States, including California, Alabama, and Florida.

Belmont Hill participates in a University of Pennsylvania-led research consortium to "systematically mobilize student insights and voices to improve school culture, policy and practice."

== Notable alumni ==
=== Literature, journalism, and the arts ===
- John Authers (exchange student), financial journalist
- Andy Cadiff, Broadway, television, and film director
- Robert Carlock, television writer and showrunner, notably 30 Rock and Unbreakable Kimmy Schmidt
- Gotham Chopra, media entrepreneur; sports documentarian
- Dan Gabriel, film director and producer, notably Mosul
- David E. Kelley, television producer, notably L.A. Law and Ally McBeal
- Robin Moore, author, notably The French Connection
- Peter Rowan, bluegrass musician
- Thomas Winship, editor of the Boston Globe
- Field Yates, sportswriter and ESPN broadcaster
- Kevin J. Walsh, Oscar-nominated film producer

=== Academia ===
- C. Loring Brace IV, professor of anthropology at the University of Michigan
- Kingman Brewster, president of Yale University; U.S. Ambassador to the United Kingdom
- William von Eggers Doering, professor of chemistry at Harvard University
- John Hilton Knowles, director of Massachusetts General Hospital; professor at Harvard Medical School
- Barry Nalebuff, professor at the Yale School of Management
- Edmund S. Morgan, professor of history at Yale University
- Robert Woodbury, chancellor of the University of Maine

=== Government ===
- Rachel Levine, U.S. Assistant Secretary of Health
- Charles Appleton Meyer, U.S. Assistant Secretary of State for Inter-American Affairs
- Mark A. Milley, 20th Chairman of the Joint Chiefs of Staff

=== Business ===
- Mortimer J. Buckley, investor; president of Vanguard
- Stephen R. Karp, real estate developer
- Jonathan Kraft, president of the New England Patriots
- Thomas H. Lee, investor
- Tony Maws, chef
- Taggart Mitt Romney, venture capitalist
- Laurence Tosi, investor

=== Other ===
- Richard W. Day, principal of Phillips Exeter Academy
- Francis Bowes Sayre Jr., dean of Washington National Cathedral
- Jesse Lally, TV personality on The Valley
