= Mark Milley =

United States Army general (born 1958)

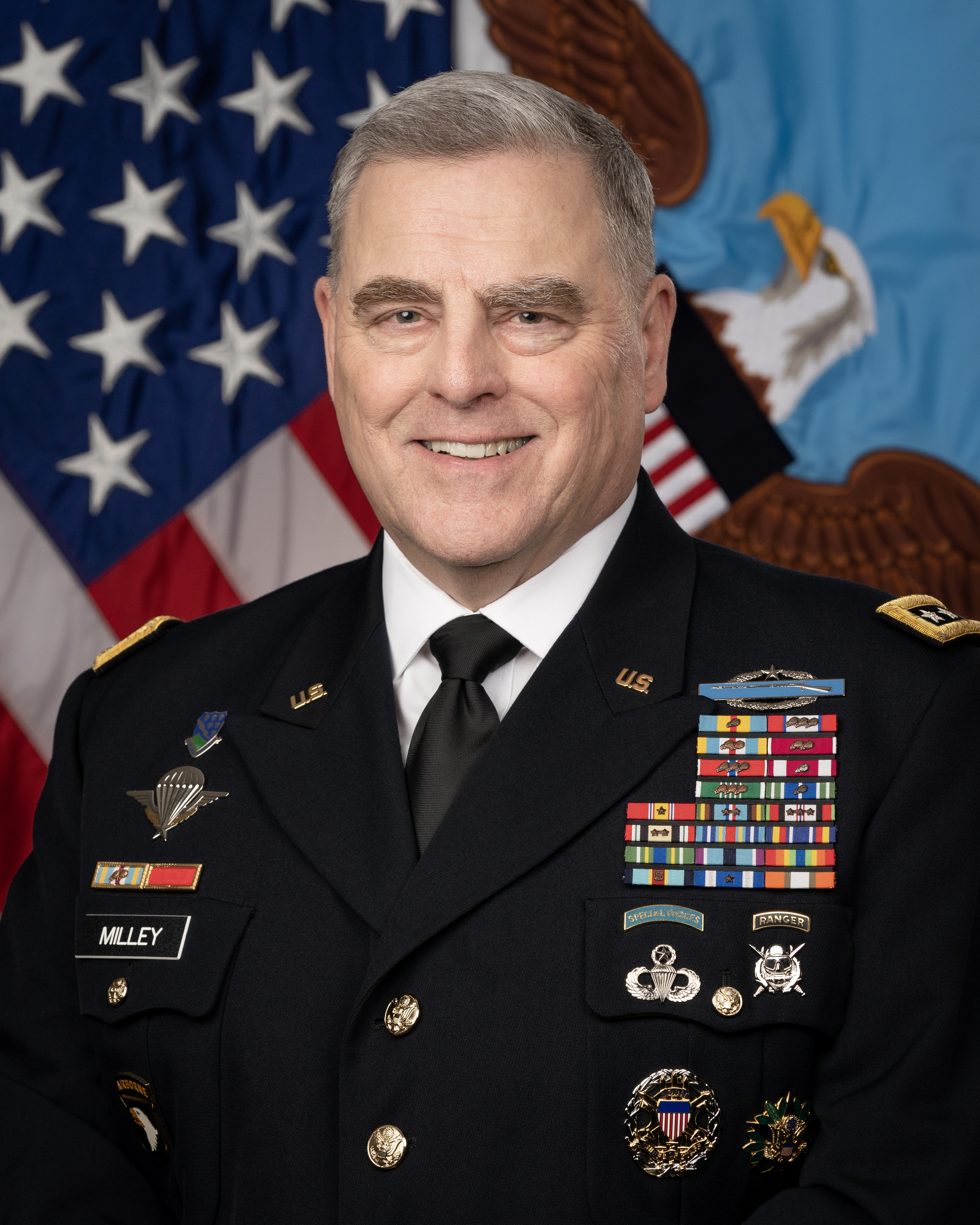
- Official portrait, 2023
- Born: Mark Alexander Milley; 20 June 1958 (age 68); Winchester, Massachusetts, U.S.
- Alma mater: Princeton University (BA); Columbia University (MIA); Naval War College (MA)
- Spouse: Hollyanne Haas (m. 1985)
- Children: 2
- Military career
- Allegiance: United States
- Branch: United States Army
- Service years: 1980–2023
- Rank: General
- Commands: Chairman of the Joint Chiefs of Staff; Chief of Staff of the United States Army; United States Army Forces Command; III Corps; International Security Assistance Force Joint Command; 10th Mountain Division; 2nd Brigade Combat Team, 10th Mountain Division (Light)
- Conflicts: Operation Just Cause; Operation Uphold Democracy; Operation Joint Endeavor; Iraq War; War in Afghanistan
- Awards: Defense Distinguished Service Medal (3); Army Distinguished Service Medal (5); Defense Superior Service Medal (3); Legion of Merit (3); Bronze Star Medal (4)
- Milley's voice Milley on how technology changes warfare and its role in the FY2021 defense budget Recorded 26 February 2020

Mark Alexander Milley (born 20 June 1958) is a retired United States Army general who served as the 20th chairman of the Joint Chiefs of Staff from 2019 to 2023. He had previously served as the 39th chief of staff of the Army from 2015 to 2019 and held multiple command and staff positions in eight divisions and special forces.

A Reserve Officers' Training Corps graduate from Princeton University, Milley earned his commission as an armor officer in 1980. He later received a master's degree from Columbia University. He had numerous deployments during his career, notably including Operation Just Cause in Panama, Operation Uphold Democracy in Haiti, the Iraq War, and the War in Afghanistan. During his first term, President Donald Trump appointed Milley chairman of the Joint Chiefs of Staff, making him the tenth U.S. Army officer to be chairman. As chairman, Milley was the highest-ranking officer in the United States Armed Forces and the principal military advisor to the president of the United States, the secretary of defense, the National Security Council and the Homeland Security Council.

Following threats by Trump, President Joe Biden issued preemptive pardons to Milley and other officials before he left office on 20 January 2025. Hours after Trump's inauguration for his second term that same day, Milley's official portrait, unveiled at the Pentagon on 10 January, was removed. A few days later, his security clearance was suspended and his security detail withdrawn.

== Early life and education ==
Milley was born on 20 June 1958, in Winchester, Massachusetts. He is of Irish descent, and was raised Roman Catholic. His paternal grandfather, Peter (1897–1976), was from Newfoundland and served with the Royal Newfoundland Regiment during the Gallipoli campaign in World War I. His father, Alexander (1924–2015), enlisted in the U.S. Navy in March 1943 as a naval corpsman. He was assigned to the 4th Marine Division and landed at Kwajalein, Saipan, Tinian and Iwo Jima. After the war, he worked as a restaurateur and food-broker. He was a member of the Knights of Columbus, whose membership is limited to Catholic men. Milley's mother, Mary Elizabeth (née Murphy), was a nurse who served with the Navy's WAVES in World War II and is described by Milley as a "break-the-glass-ceiling" type of woman.

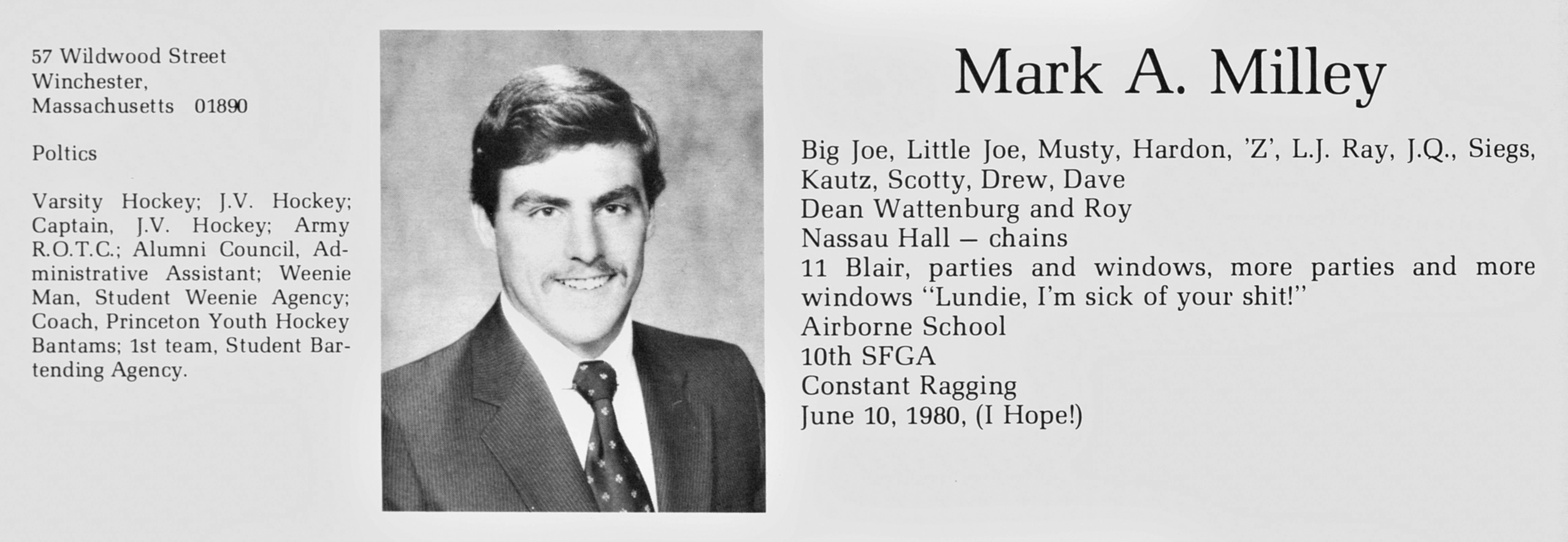
Milley in the Princeton University yearbook, 1980

Milley attended a Catholic grammar school where he played hockey. Good grades and athletic ability led to his being recruited to Belmont Hill School. and afterwards to Princeton University where he played varsity ice hockey.

There he joined the Reserve Officers' Training Corps, and in 1980 graduated with a Bachelor of Arts degree in politics after completing a 185-page-long senior thesis titled "The Irish Republican Army: A Critical Analysis of Revolutionary Guerrilla Organization in Theory and Practice". Milley holds a Master of International Affairs degree from the School of International & Public Affairs at Columbia University and another Master of Arts degree in national security and strategic studies from the Naval War College. He is also an attendee of the MIT Center for International Studies Seminar XXI National Security Studies Program.

== U.S. Army officer (1980–2023) ==
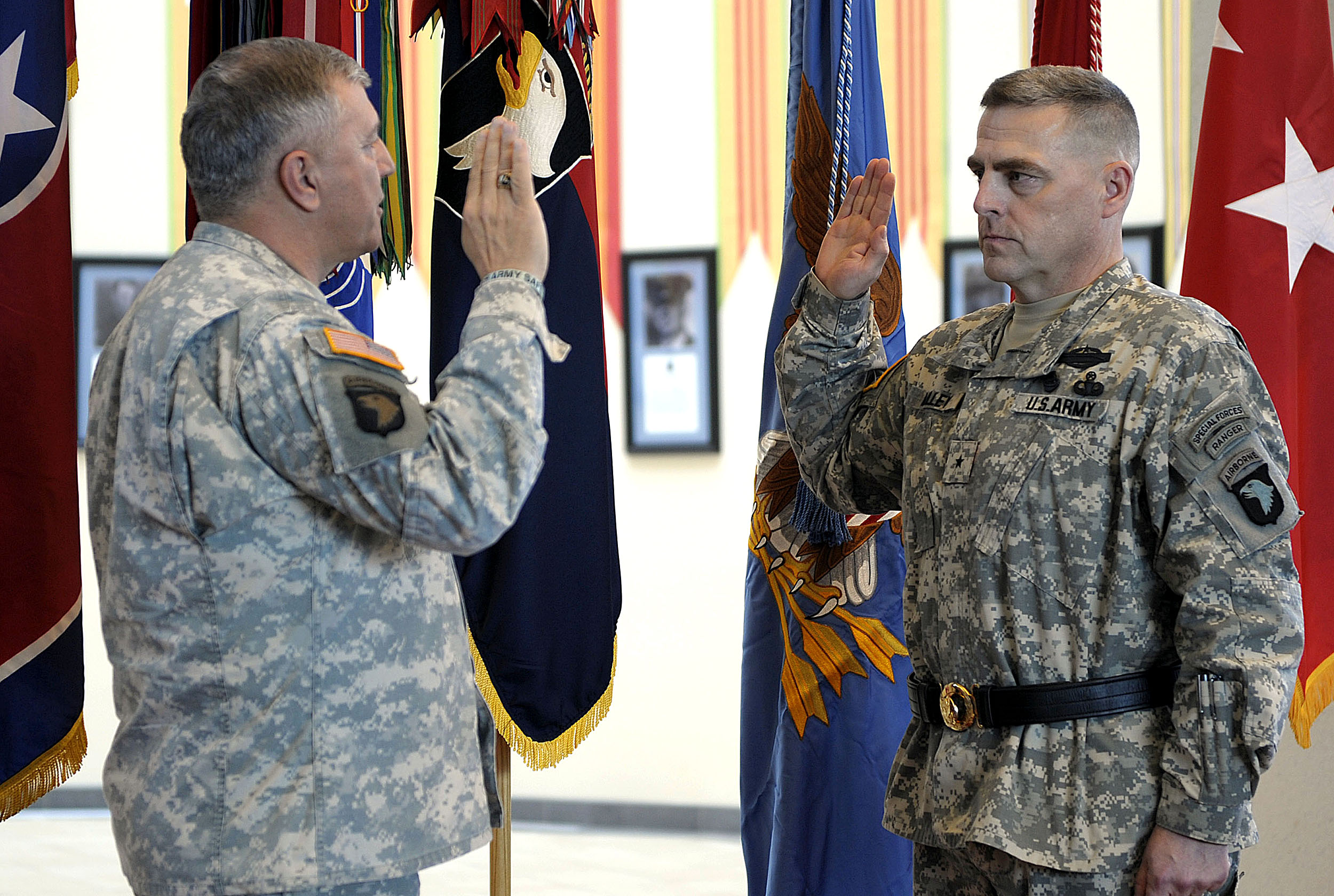
General Richard A. Cody administers the oath of office upon Milley's promotion to brigadier general in February 2008.

Milley earned his commission as an armor officer through Princeton's Army Reserve Officers' Training Corps program in 1980. His career included assignments with the 82nd Airborne Division, 5th Special Forces Group, 7th Infantry Division, 2nd Infantry Division, Joint Readiness Training Center, 25th Infantry Division, Operations Staff of the Joint Staff, and a posting as Military Assistant to the Secretary of Defense. His deployments included the Multinational Force and Observers in Egypt, Operation Just Cause in Panama, Operation Uphold Democracy in Haiti, Operation Joint Endeavor and Joint Forge in Bosnia and Herzegovina, Operation Iraqi Freedom in Iraq, three tours during Operation Enduring Freedom in Afghanistan, and other deployments to Colombia, Somalia, and South Korea.

Milley held multiple command and staff positions in eight divisions and units, including the 5th Special Forces Group and 10th Mountain Division, throughout his military career. He served as a commander of ODA 543, a 12-man combat diver-qualified Special Forces team. He commanded 1st Battalion, 506th Infantry, 2nd Infantry Division, in South Korea from 1996 to 1998. He served as commander of 2nd Brigade Combat Team, 10th Mountain Division (Light) from December 2003 to July 2005; deputy commanding general for operations of the 101st Airborne Division from July 2007 to April 2008, and as commanding general of the 10th Mountain Division from November 2011 to December 2012. Milley commanded III Corps, based at Fort Hood, Texas, from December 2012 to August 2014, and concurrently the International Security Assistance Force Joint Command from May 2013 to February 2014. He served as the commanding general of the United States Army Forces Command at Fort Bragg, North Carolina from August 2014 to August 2015.

=== Chief of Staff of the Army ===
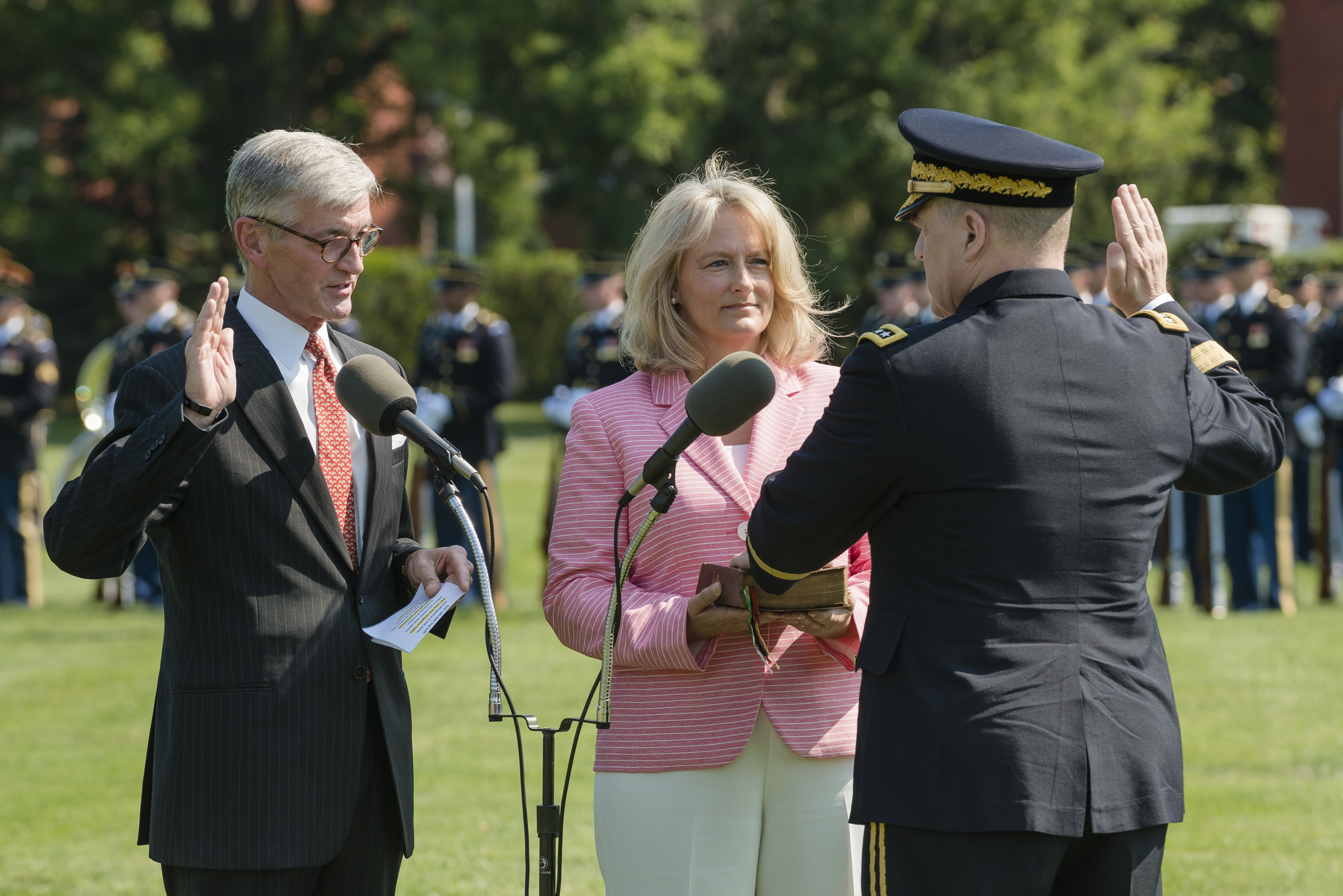
Secretary of the Army John M. McHugh administers the oath of office to incoming Army chief of staff Milley during the change of responsibility ceremony on August 14, 2015.

Milley was appointed chief of staff of the Army on 14 August 2015. In his initial message to the U.S. Army, General Milley laid out his priorities on readiness, the future Army, and taking care of troops. "We must ensure the Army remains ready as the world's premier combat force. Readiness for ground combat is—and will remain—the U.S. Army's #1 priority. We will do what it takes to build an agile, adaptive Army of the future".

==== Modernization and reform ====
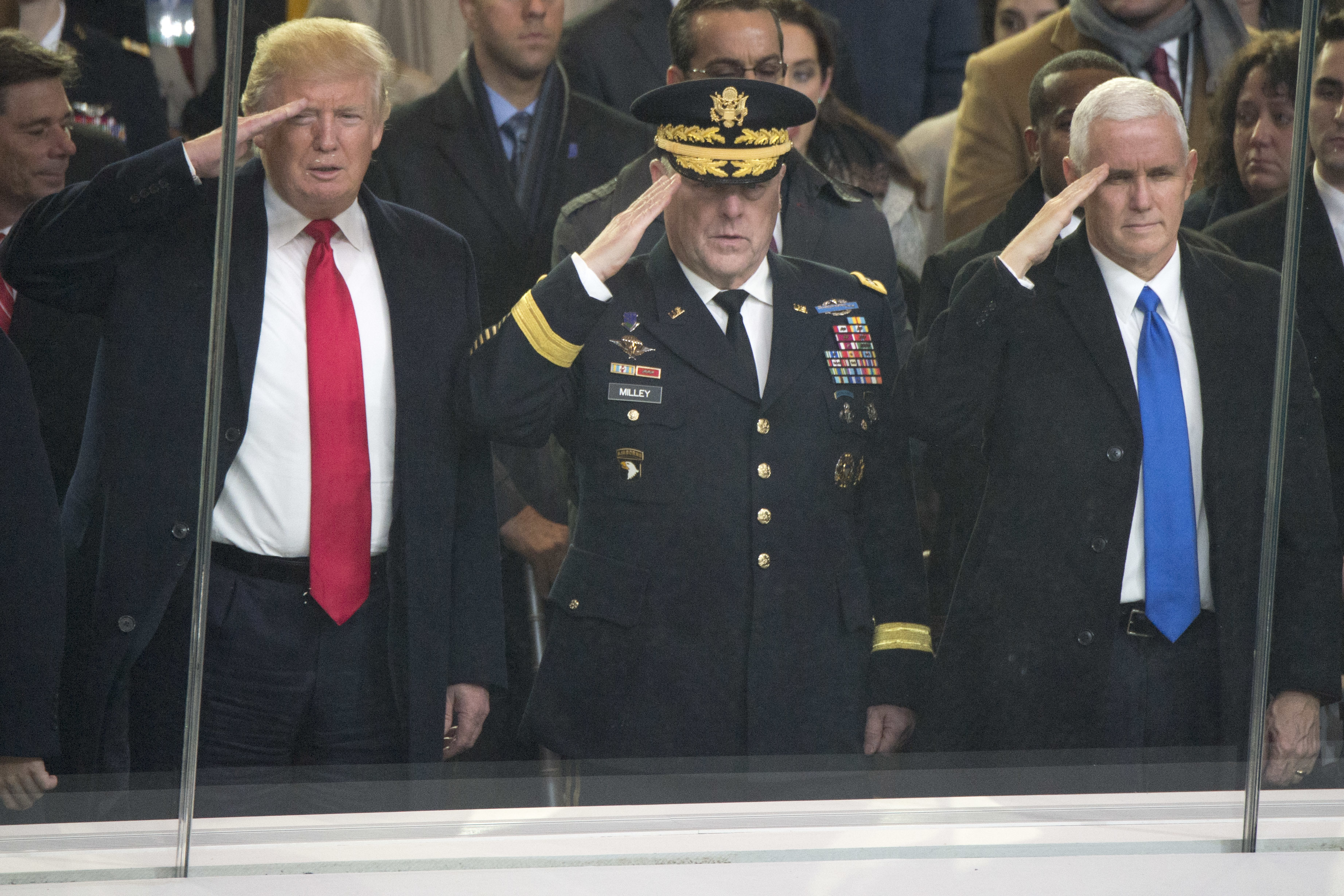
General Milley, President Trump and Vice President Pence salute during Trump's inauguration parade on 20 January 2017.

During his tenure, Milley focused heavily on modernization efforts for the Army, which included a new command designed to consolidate the methods that deliver Army capabilities, similar to the approach used by U.S. Special Operations Command. At the 2017 Association of the United States Army annual meeting, Milley described the areas targeted for modernization, including tanks, aircraft and weapons. Milley said: "Faster results will be obtained...as we shift to a SOCOM-like model of buy, try, decide and acquire rather than the current industrial-age linear model that takes years to establish requirements, decades to test, and it may take a long, long time to go from idea to delivery". He warned: "If we adapt to the changing character of war, and we embrace the institutional changes that we need to implement, then we will continue to be the most lethal fighting force in the world for the next seven decades and beyond. If we do not, we will lose the next war".

In February 2017, the Army announced the establishment of Security Force Assistance Brigades. Also known as SFABs, these permanent units were established in Fort Benning with a core mission to conduct security cooperation activities and serve as a quick response to combatant commander requirements.

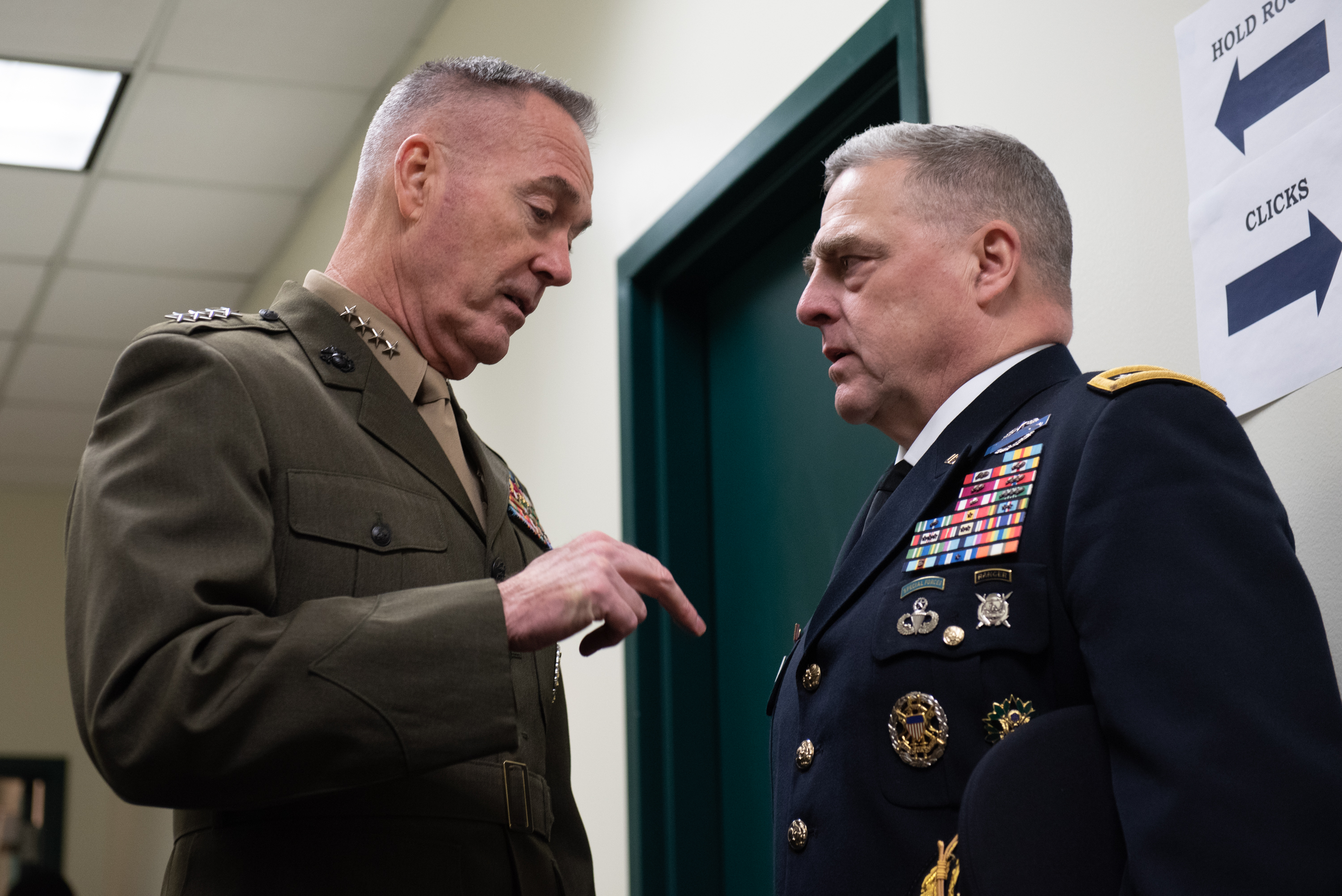
General Joseph Dunford, chairman of the Joint Chiefs of Staff, speaks with Milley before the 2018 Army–Navy Game.

While their training would be similar to that of Special Forces, soldiers in the SFABs would not be considered Special Forces, Milley said. "They will be trained in many ways similar to Special Forces, but they are not Special Forces". These SFABs will be structured using the non-commissioned and commissioned officers of infantry brigade combat teams to train foreign military units in conventional light infantry tactics, Milley said.

In 2018, Secretary of the Army Mark Esper and Milley established Army Futures Command in Austin, Texas, to take advantage of nearby academic and industrial expertise. Coequal in status to the Army's three senior most commands: Army Forces Command, Army Material Command, and Army Training and Doctrine Command, it represented one of the largest reform initiatives undertaken in more than forty years. Beyond developing future warfighting concepts, eight cross-functional teams conducted research to further the Army's modernization priorities: long-range precision fires, next-generation combat vehicles, air and missile defenses, soldier lethality, synthetic training environments, future vehicle lift platforms, and assured positioning, navigation, and timing.

In 2018, Esper and Milley also led the roll-out of a new Army Combat Fitness Test. The new fitness test was designed to improve overall combat readiness and mimic physical tasks and stresses associated with combat and was set to replace the 40-year-old Army fitness test by October 2020. Milley said: "We want to make sure that our soldiers are... in top physical shape to withstand the rigors of ground combat. Combat is not for the faint of heart, it's not for the weak-kneed, it's not for those who are not psychologically resilient and tough and hardened to the brutality, to the viciousness of it".

==== Army Green Service Uniform ====
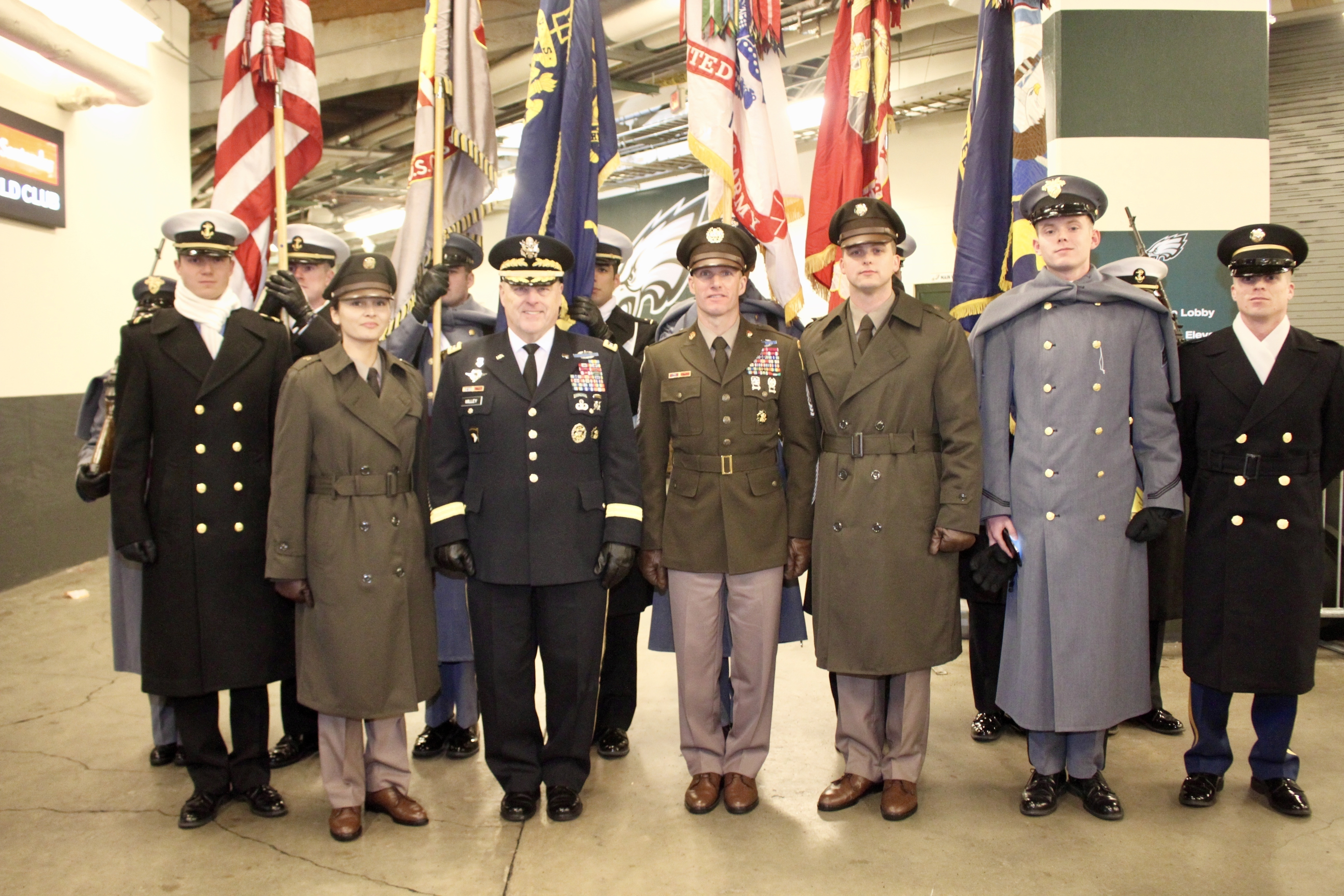
General Milley stands with Sergeant Major of the Army Daniel A. Dailey and soldiers modeling the proposed "Pinks and Greens" uniform.

In early 2017, Milley and then-Sergeant Major of the Army Daniel A. Dailey began considering the possibility of bringing back an iconic two-tone uniform known as the "Pinks and Greens" to honor the "greatest generation" of soldiers who fought in World War II.

The Army believed the reintroduction of the uniform would give soldiers a uniform for professional environments that honored the Army heritage, reconnect today's soldiers with their service history, strengthen pride, bolster recruiting and enhance readiness.

According to an Army Times poll conducted in the fall of 2018, of the 32,000 respondents, 72 percent indicated they were ready to embrace a new uniform, while 28 percent said they were happy with the current blue Army Service Uniform. Soldiers did express concerns about the need for an additional uniform as well as the costs associated with acquiring the new uniform. The Army tried to address this concern in its official roll-out announcement on 11 November 2018, indicating the uniform would be cost-neutral for enlisted soldiers, who would be able to purchase the new "everyday business-wear uniform" with their existing annual clothing allowance. The Army also indicated the new uniform would come "at no additional cost" to U.S. taxpayers and would be made in the U.S. Secretary of the Army Esper, who also championed the iconic "pinks and greens" uniform and worked with Milley and Dailey on the initiative, approved its return in November 2018.

==== Iraq War study ====
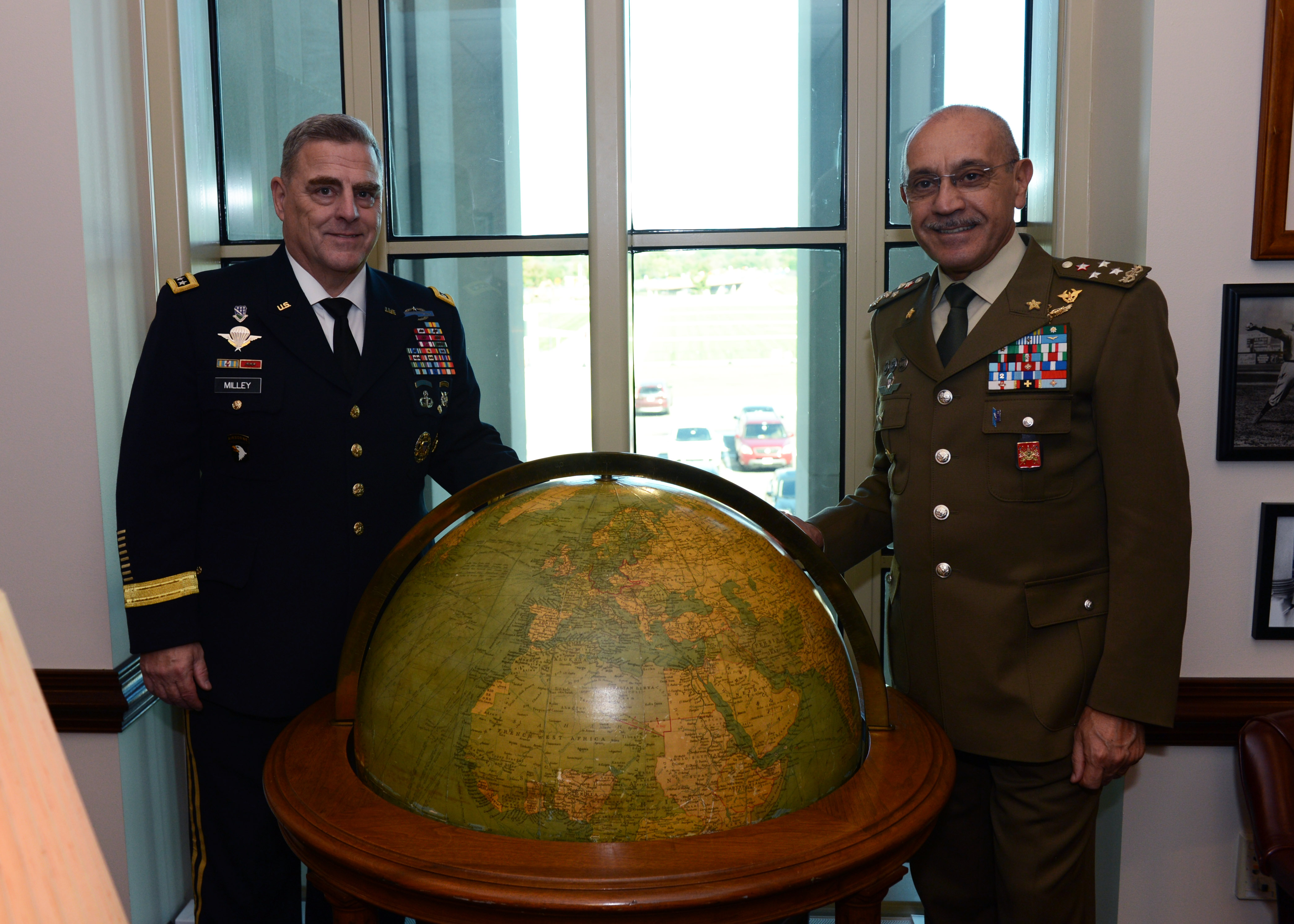
General Milley with the Italian chief of Army staff Lieutenant General Danilo Errico at the Pentagon on October 17, 2017

In 2018, Milley was involved in deciding whether the Army would publish a controversial study on the 2003–2006 Iraq War. Milley reportedly decided he wanted to read the two-volume, 1,300-page, 500,000-word document before making a decision. Milley also directed that an external panel of scholars review the work. After the panel returned glowing reviews on the study, including one that described it as "the gold standard in official history", Milley continued to delay publication so he could review it further. When confronted by a journalist from The Wall Street Journal in October 2018, Milley reversed these decisions, ordering the study published officially and with a foreword from himself. He said the team who wrote the study "did a damn good job", the study itself was "a solid work", and that he aimed to publish the study by the holidays (2018).

Within days of this revelation, two members of Congress who sit on the House Armed Services Committee (Reps. Jackie Speier, D-California, and Ruben Gallego, D-Arizona) sent a letter to Army leaders expressing their anger over the delay. In a press release accompanying the letter to Milley and Esper, Speier said, "This is simply the Army being unwilling to publicly air its mistakes. Our military, Congress, and the American people deserve nothing less than total transparency on the lessons the Army has identified so that we may use those lessons to avoid costly, and too often deadly, mistakes of the past". The two-volume study was published 17 January 2019.

==== Report on climate change ====
In May 2019, Milley commissioned a U.S. Army War College report on the impact of climate change on society as a whole and on the U.S. military. The report was written by U.S. government officials from agencies including the U.S. Army, Defense Intelligence Agency, and NASA and released in August 2019. It outlined the possibility of blackouts, disease, thirst, starvation and war due to collapses of the country's aging power grid, its food supply systems, and the U.S. military. The report also mentions the likelihood of increasing water scarcity and failure of global food systems in developing countries which would result in an increase of civil and military conflicts.

=== Chairman of the Joint Chiefs of Staff ===
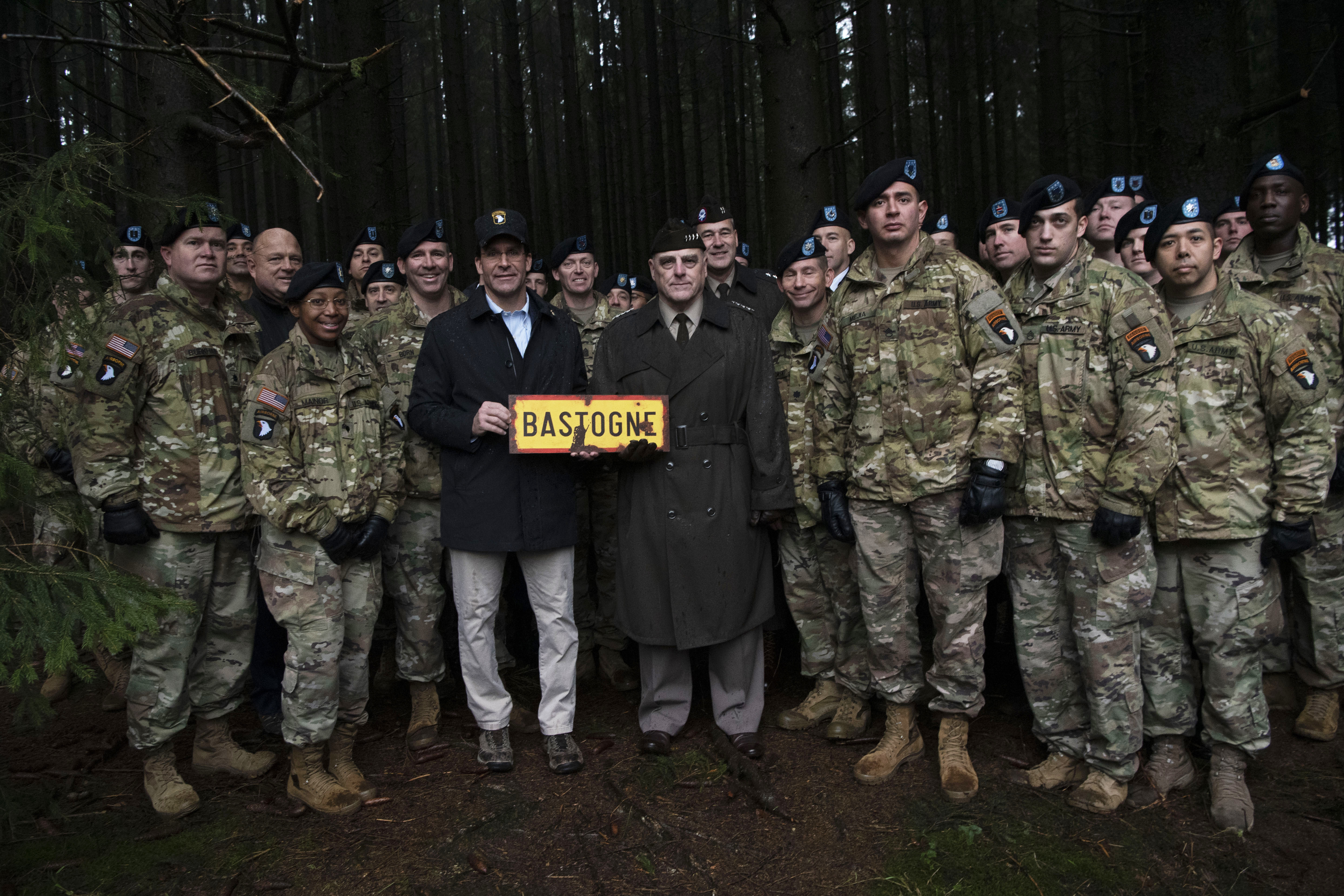
Milley, Defense Secretary Mark Esper, and members of the 101st Airborne Division tour the Bois Jacques during the 75th anniversary of the Battle of the Bulge, December 2019

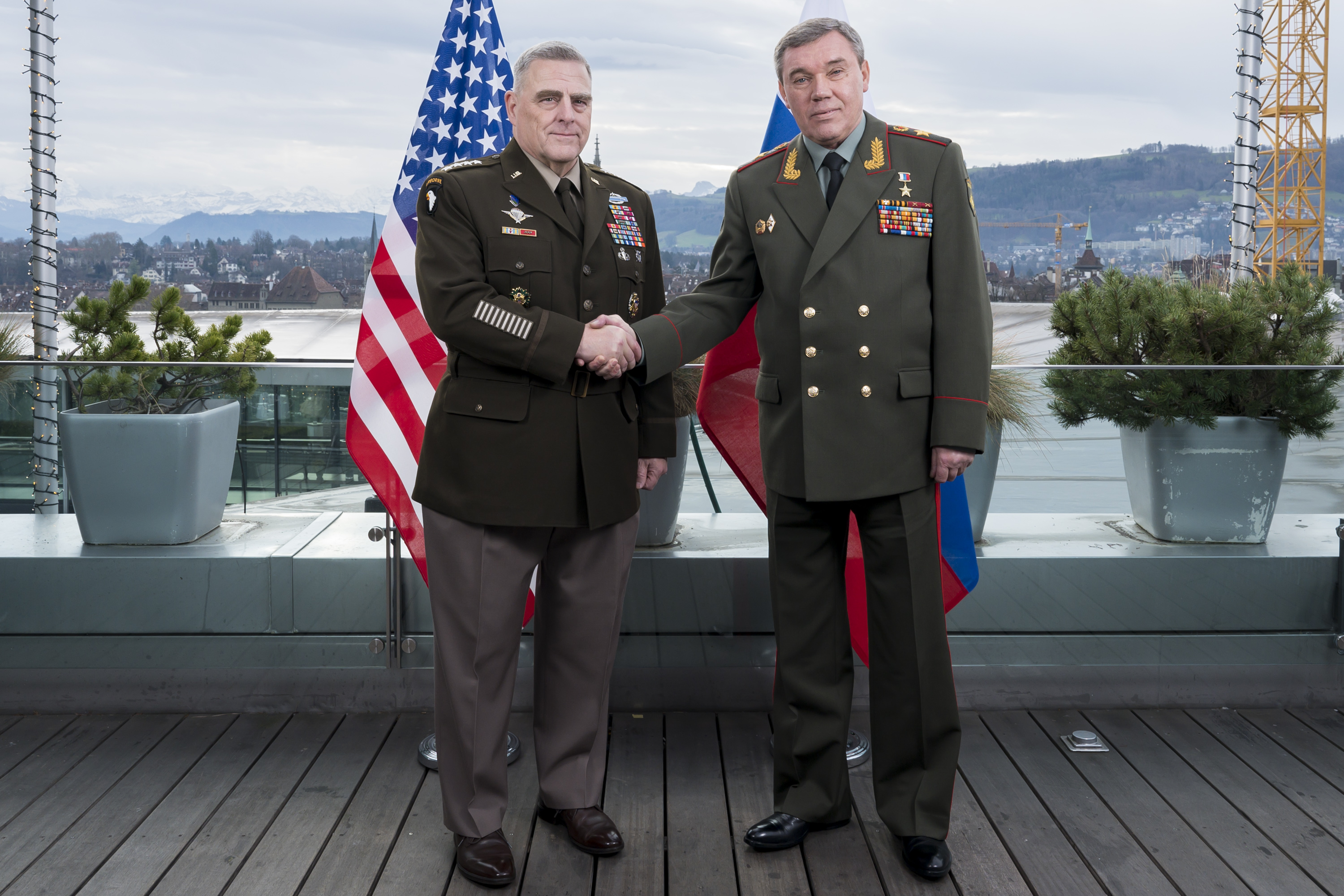
Milley with General Valery Gerasimov in Bern, Switzerland, on December 18, 2019

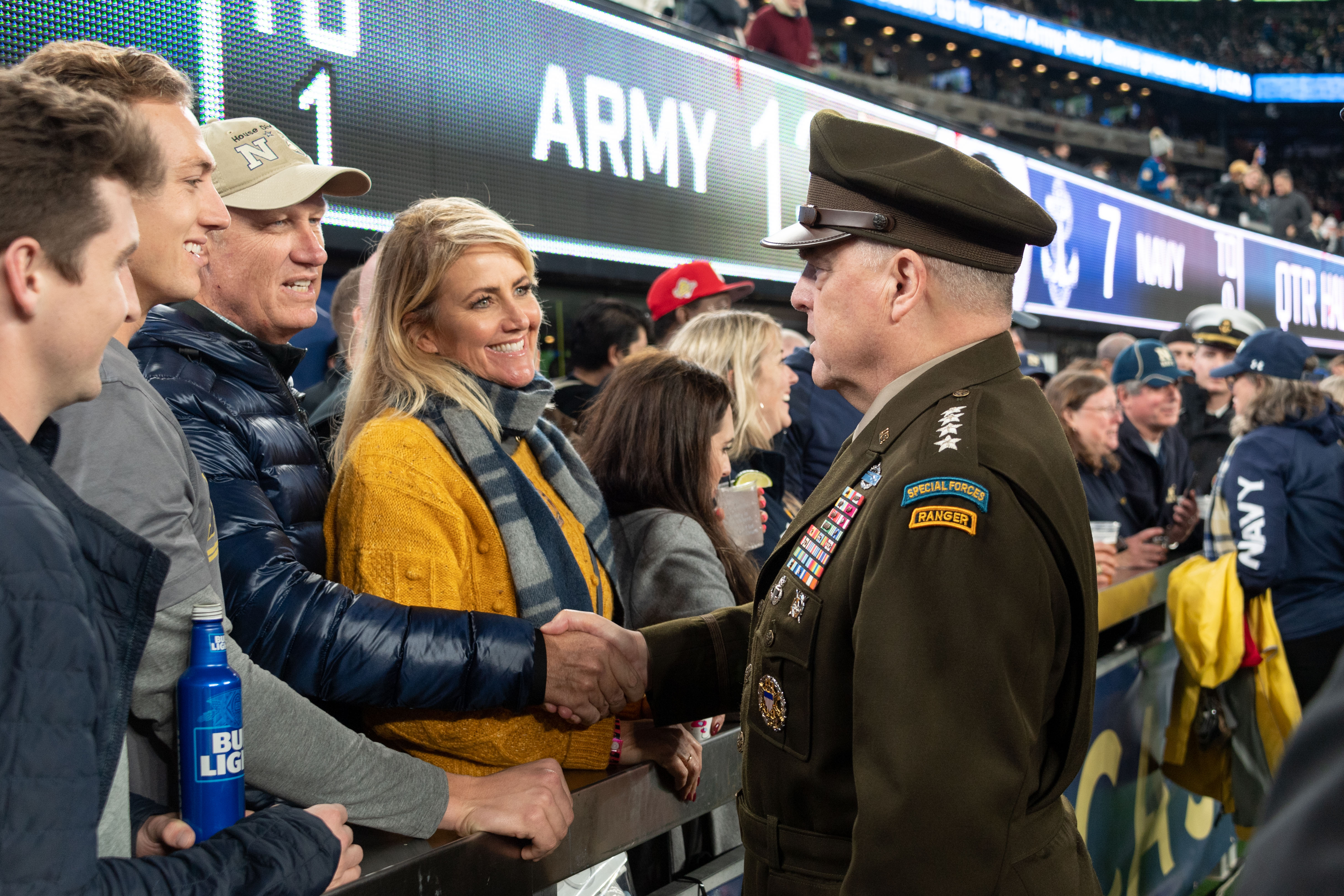
Milley shaking hands with a Navy fan before the 2021 Army–Navy football game

Milley was the Chairman of the Joint Chiefs of Staff from 30 September 2019, to 30 September 2023.

==== First Trump administration ====
On 8 December 2018, Trump announced that he would nominate Milley to serve as chairman of the Joint Chiefs of Staff, although Secretary of Defense Jim Mattis and then-Chairman of the Joint Chiefs of Staff General Joseph Dunford favored Air Force Chief of Staff General David L. Goldfein for the appointment. Initially Milley had been fielded as a candidate to succeed Curtis Scaparrotti as commander of the United States European Command and Supreme Allied Commander Europe but after the interview with Trump was nominated for the chairmanship instead. He was confirmed by the Senate 89–1 on 25 July 2019, and sworn in on 30 September. After attending 75th anniversary commemorations of the Battle of the Bulge in Belgium on 16 December 2019, Milley met with the Russian military chief of staff Valery Gerasimov in Bern, Switzerland, on 18 December. That continued a series of meetings between the American and Russian military chiefs reestablished by Milley's predecessor Joseph Dunford in 2017 to ensure open communication and reduce the risks in conflict areas.

During Trump's re-election campaign, a photograph featuring Vice President Mike Pence, Trump, Esper, and Milley, was used in one of Trump's political ads. Defense officials said that the image was used without Milley's knowledge and consent and that the ad was later removed "ahead of time".

===== St. John's Church incident =====
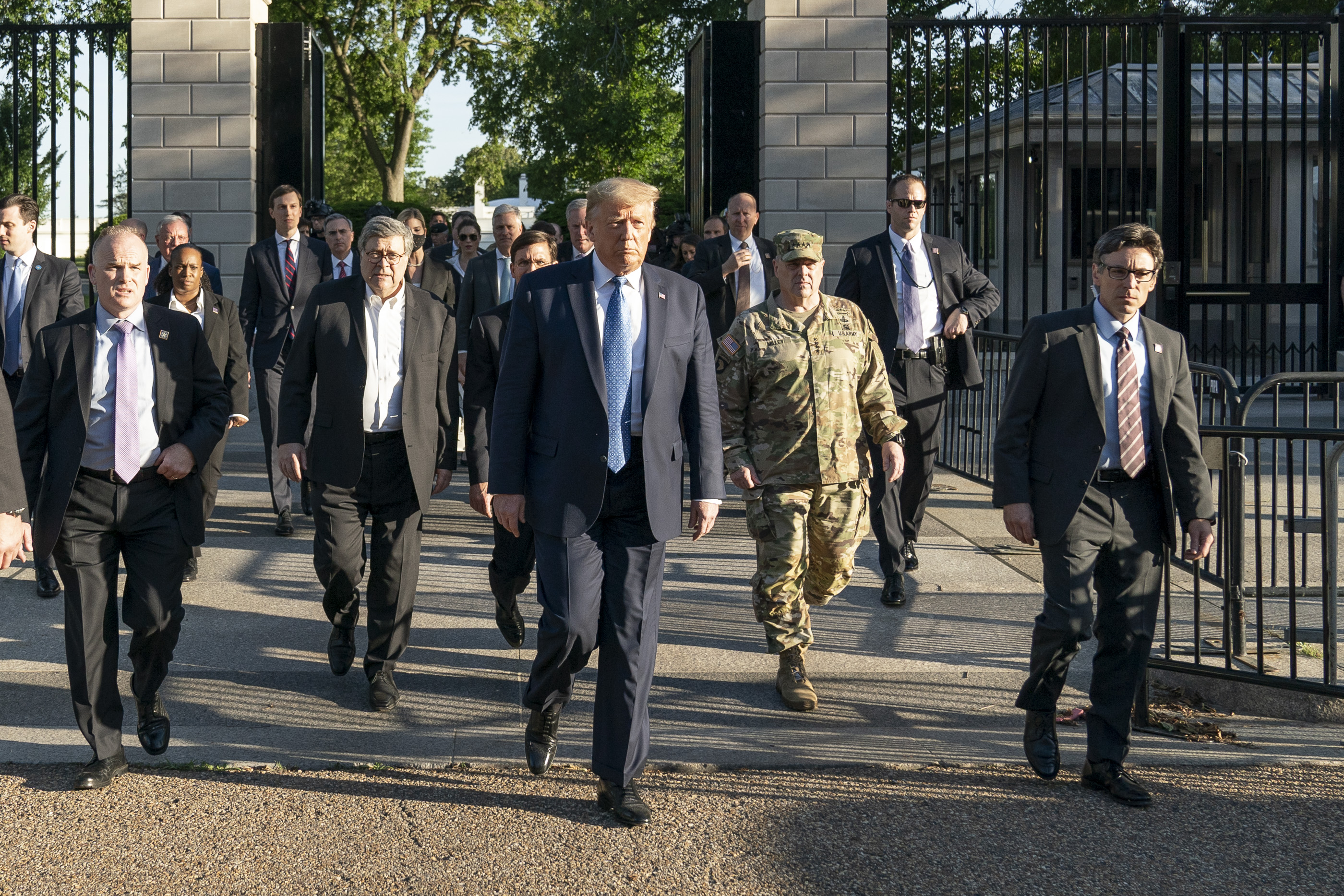
Milley walking behind Trump from the White House to St. John's Episcopal Church on 1 June 2020

On 1 June 2020, during the protests in Washington, D.C., which followed the murder of George Floyd, Milley, in combat uniform, walked with the president from the White House across Lafayette Square to St. John's Episcopal Church about half an hour after federal officers and police had used tear gas and other riot control tactics to disperse protestors, drawing sharp criticism from former military officers and others.

According to Peril, Milley attended the walk in combat fatigues as he had been summoned away at short notice from a planned visit to an FBI operations center, and immediately departed once he and Esper realized the political implications of the walk, saying that he felt "sick" and was "fucking done with this shit" to Esper. As a result, Milley was not present for Trump's photo op at St. John's Church. The House Armed Services Committee later requested that Esper and Milley testify before the committee about the military's role in the George Floyd protests, which they did on 9 July.

===== Unsent resignation letter =====
Milley reportedly considered resigning over the incident in front of the St. John's Church, going so far as to draft a highly critical resignation letter to President Trump, but then deciding against handing the letter over to him. The resignation letter draft was later published in 2022. At the last minute before submitting the resignation letter to the president, Milley opted against resignation and instead apologized for his presence at the St. John's Church incident in a video recorded as his commencement address at the National Defense University on 11 June. At the commencement speech he explained that he should not have been at the event because his presence created a perception of military involvement in domestic politics.

===== After the 2020 election =====
After losing his bid for reelection in November 2020, Trump and his allies made attempts to overturn the 2020 United States presidential election, presaging the attack on the Capitol on 6 January 2021. According to I Alone Can Fix It, a July 2021 book by The Washington Post reporters Philip Rucker and Carol Leonnig, Milley became concerned Trump was preparing to stage a coup, and held informal discussions with his deputies about possible ways to thwart it, telling associates: "They may try, but they're not going to fucking succeed. You can't do this without the military. You can't do this without the CIA and the FBI. We're the guys with the guns".

Rucker and Leonnig's book also quoted Milley as saying "this is a Reichstag moment", comparing Trump's attempts to overturn the election to the event used to cement Nazi Germany and referring to Trump's false statements about electoral fraud as "the gospel of the Führer". Milley reportedly told police and military officials preparing to secure Joe Biden's presidential inauguration: "Everyone in this room, whether you're a cop, whether you're a soldier, we're going to stop these guys to make sure we have a peaceful transfer of power. We're going to put a ring of steel around this city and the Nazis aren't getting in". Trump later said that he had not threatened or spoken about a coup and falsely claimed that Obama had fired Milley.

On 12 January 2021, Milley and the Joint Chiefs of Staff issued a statement condemning the storming of the U.S. Capitol by supporters of Trump and reminding all service members of their obligation to support and defend the Constitution and reject extremism. They said: "As we have done throughout our history, the U.S. military will obey lawful orders from civilian leadership, support civilian authorities to protect lives and property, ensure public safety in accordance with the law, and remain fully committed to protecting and defending the Constitution of the United States against all enemies, foreign and domestic". In an interview on 2 April, Milley said that the military reaction and response were "sprint speed" and "super fast". Speaker of the House of Representatives Nancy Pelosi said from her personal experience that was not the case, and called for a commission to find the truth.

===== Calls with Chinese general =====
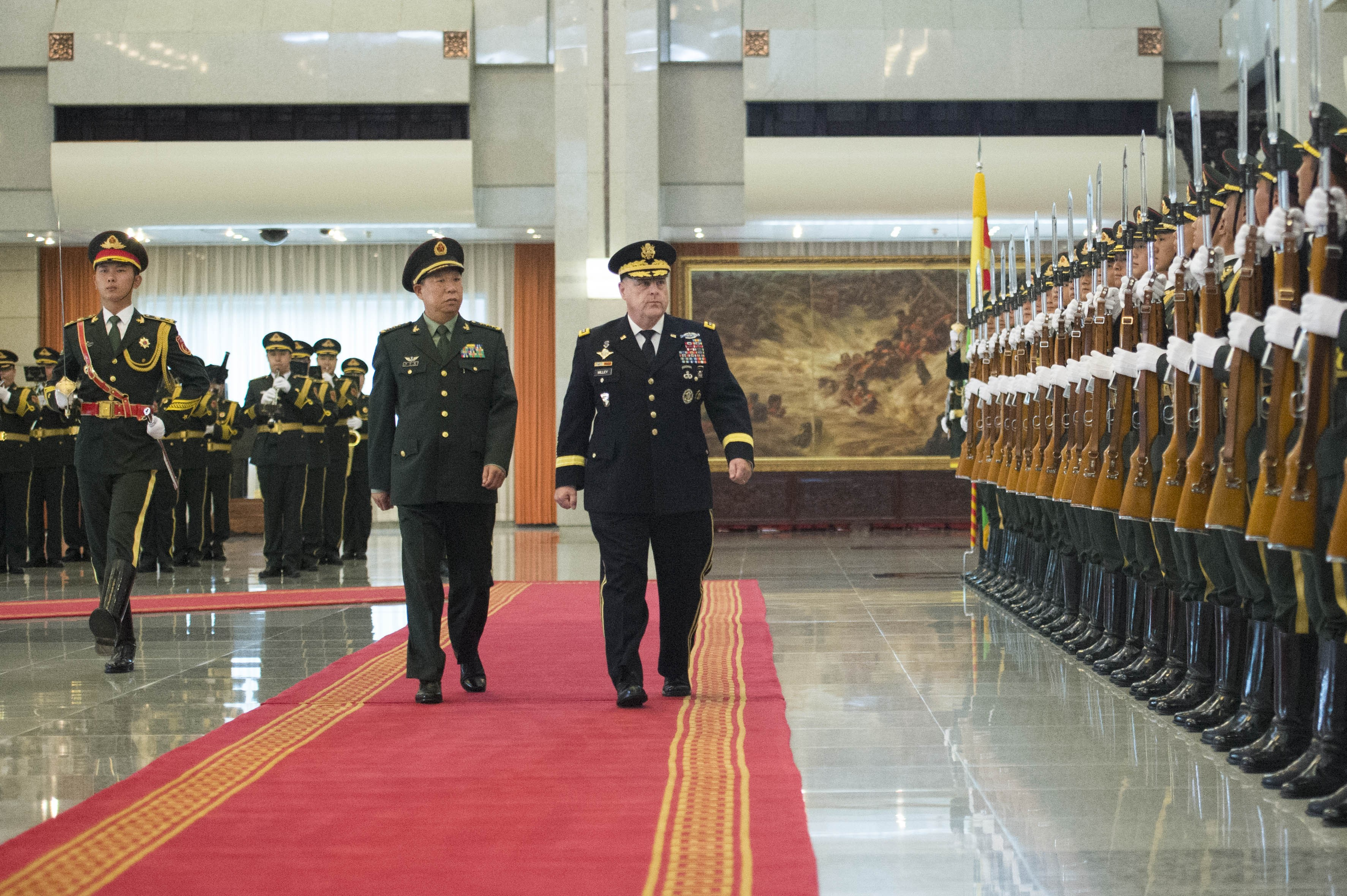
Milley, as Army chief of staff, performs a military inspection alongside his PRC counterpart, Commander of the PLA Ground Force General Li Zuocheng at the Bayi building in Beijing, on August 16, 2016.

According to a September 2021 Axios report, in mid-2020 Pentagon officials were concerned about the Chinese having received bad intelligence from dubious sources that had them worried about a possible surprise U.S. strike against China. In a report released in November 2021, the Pentagon confirmed these Chinese worries and that Esper had directed Milley and the deputy assistant defense secretary for China Chad Sbragia in mid-October to reassure their Chinese counterparts that the U.S. "had no intention of instigating a military crisis against China". Milley called his Chinese counterpart on 30 October.

In Woodward and Costa's book Peril, the authors wrote that on 30 October 2020, four days before the U.S. presidential election day, Milley called his counterpart in China, General Li Zuocheng, quoting Milley as saying: "I want to assure you that the American government is stable and everything is going to be okay... We are not going to attack or conduct any kinetic operations against you ... If we're going to attack, I'm going to call you ahead of time. It's not going to be a surprise". The authors wrote that Milley again called Li in January 2021, two days after the 2021 United States Capitol attack, quoting Milley as saying: "Things may look unsteady... But that's the nature of democracy... We are 100 percent steady. Everything's fine. But democracy can be sloppy sometimes". Unnamed defense department officials said Sbragia had called his Chinese counterpart two days earlier, with the authorization of then-acting secretary of defense Christopher C. Miller. One briefed on Milley's call said that it was "implausible that (Milley's call) would have been done without" Sbragia's knowledge.

Both calls were by video conference where fifteen people were present, including a State Department representative and notetakers. CNN reported that Milley consulted with Esper in conducting the October call. Politico reported that a former senior defense official said Milley asked Miller for permission to make the January call, and that Miller said Milley "almost certainly" informed him about making the call, but he did not recall receiving a detailed readout afterwards. On 15 September, Miller told Fox News that he did not authorize the call and called for Milley to resign or be fired; multiple sources told Fox News that the calls were conducted with full knowledge of Esper and Miller.

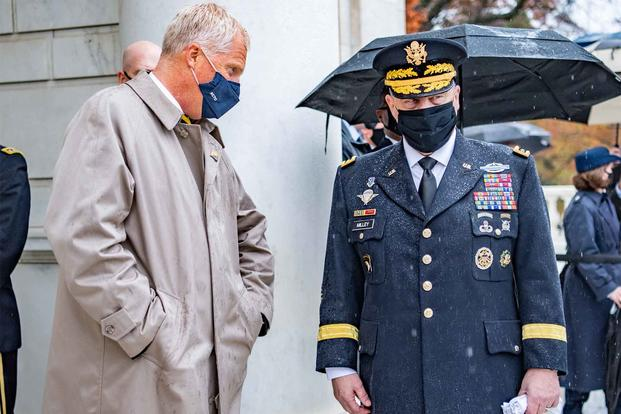
Milley with acting Secretary of Defense Miller at Arlington National Cemetery on November 11, 2020

Two days later he told CNN that "he likely would not have been informed of such routine engagements that either his office or Milley would have had with China" and that he was criticizing the call in October, not the one in January. At a congressional hearing on 28 September 2021, Milley testified that both calls were coordinated with the staffs of Esper and Miller both before and after they were made. The Wall Street Journal reported Pentagon officials said Miller had been apprised of the call. Milley's spokesman said, "All calls from the Chairman to his counterparts, including those reported, are staffed, coordinated and communicated with the Department of Defense and the interagency".

Milley stated that the calls were "routine calls ... in order to ensure strategic stability" and "perfectly within the duties and responsibilities of the chairman". In hearings before the Senate and House Armed Services committees on 28 and 29 September, respectively, Milley said he did not intend to undermine Trump with the calls, adding that he "was communicating to my Chinese counterpart on instructions, by the way, to de-escalate the situation" and that Trump "has no intent to attack and I told [General Li] that repeatedly". After the storming of the U.S. Capitol, Milley also spoke to other military leaders around the world, including in the United Kingdom, to reassure them "that the U.S. government was strong and in control".

===== Meeting on nuclear launch procedure =====
Woodward and Costa also wrote that after the attack on the Capitol, Milley became concerned Trump might "go rogue", telling staff "You never know what a president's trigger point is". According to the book, he took extraordinary action to protect national security by insisting he be personally consulted about any military action orders by Trump, including the use of nuclear weapons, and instructed the directors of the CIA and NSA to be particularly attentive to developments. This was perceived by some former officials and outside analysts as "inserting himself inappropriately into the chain of command". On 8 January, Milley assured House Speaker Nancy Pelosi (D-Calif.) in a call that "the nuclear triggers are secure and we're not going to do—we're not going to allow anything crazy, illegal, immoral, or unethical to happen".

===== Additional actions =====
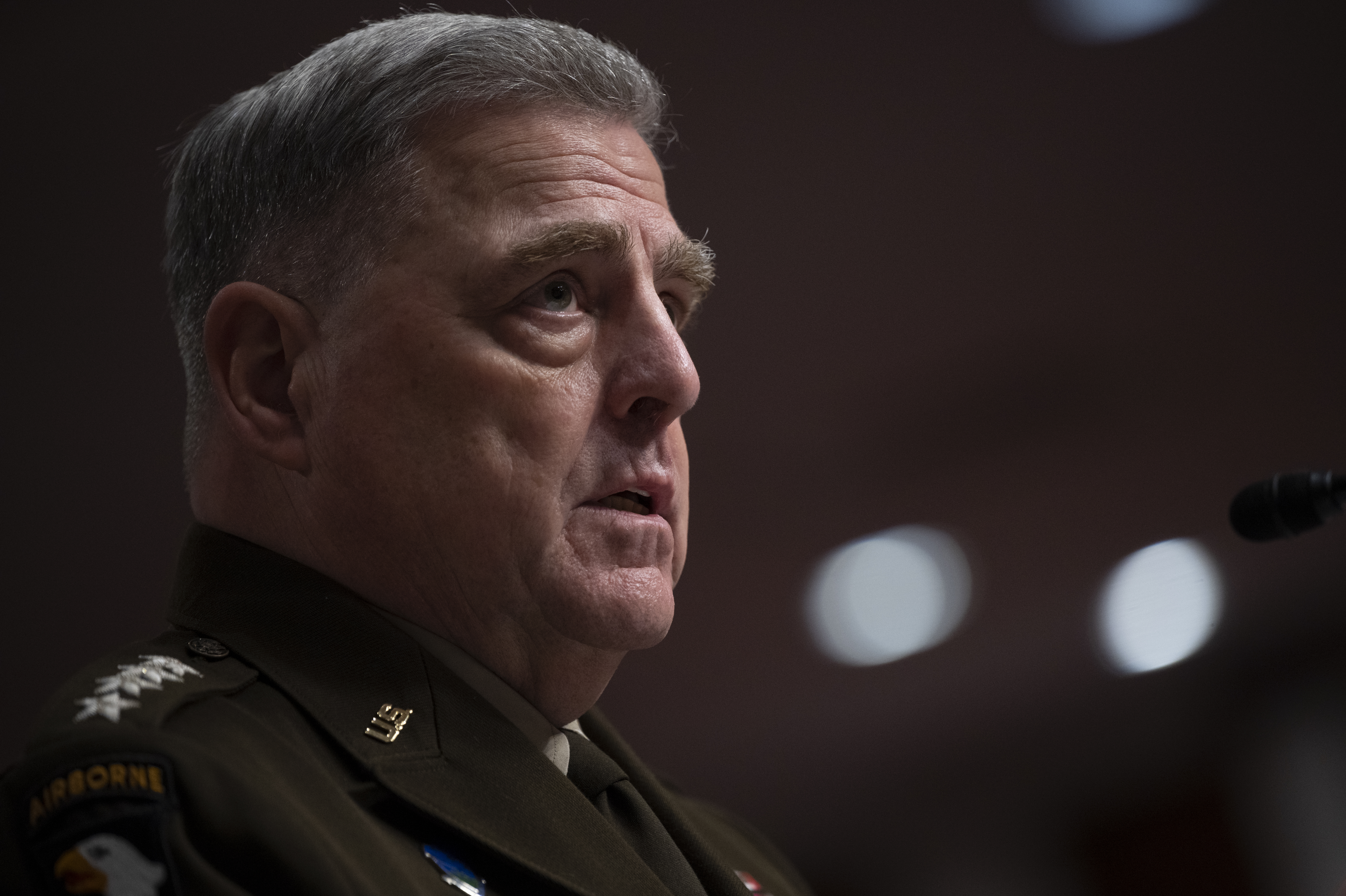
Milley testifies on 28 September 2021 before the Senate Armed Services Committee on the withdrawal from Afghanistan and his calls to China.

Milley's reported comments and actions drew criticism from multiple Republicans. Trump described Woodward and Costa's reporting as "fake news" and "fabricated", stating that he "never even thought of attacking China". Trump also said that if the reporting was true, then he believed Milley should be "tried for treason" for talking to Li "behind the President's back and telling China that he would be giving them notification" of an American attack.

Senate Intelligence Committee ranking member Marco Rubio called on Biden to fire Milley, stating that Milley had undermined "the sitting commander in chief" and "contemplated a treasonous leak of classified information to the Chinese Communist Party in advance of a potential armed conflict with the People's Republic of China". Many Republicans accused Milley of treason and called for his resignation, firing, or court-martial. (Note: Senators Cynthia Lummis, Roger Marshall, Rand Paul, and Representatives Andy Biggs, Dan Bishop, Byron Donalds Matt Gaetz, Marjorie Taylor Greene, Jody Hice, Doug Lamborn, and Chris Stewart.) Alexander Vindman said that Milley needed to resign if it was true that he broke the chain of command. Twenty-seven House Republicans, all members of the Freedom Caucus, wrote to Secretary of Defense Lloyd Austin demanding an Army Regulation 15-6 investigation into Milley's actions and for Milley's security clearance to be suspended.

Historian and Brookings Institution senior fellow Max Boot, a critic of Trump, wrote that "Milley had no choice but to do what he did". He also wrote that "Trump, Rubio and all the rest of the rabid partisans who accused a decorated combat veteran of treason based on a hasty misreading of a book excerpt" needed to retract their statements and apologize. White House press secretary Jen Psaki said that Biden had worked closely with Milley and considered him to be a patriot. Pentagon spokesperson John Kirby stated that Milley had the trust and confidence of Austin.

Senate Judiciary Committee chair Dick Durbin (D-Illinois) said that he had "no concerns that Milley might have exceeded his authority" and that Democratic lawmakers "were circumspect in our language but many of us made it clear that we were counting on him to avoid the disaster which we knew could happen at any moment". Biden later said he had "great confidence" in Milley. Senator Angus King said that Milley had "rendered the country a significant service", and U.S. Senate Committee on Armed Services chair Jack Reed told reporters that "de-escalating international tensions was part of Milley's job". Former United Nations ambassador and Trump national security advisor John Bolton defended Milley as a "staunch supporter of the Constitution and the rule of law".

==== Biden administration ====
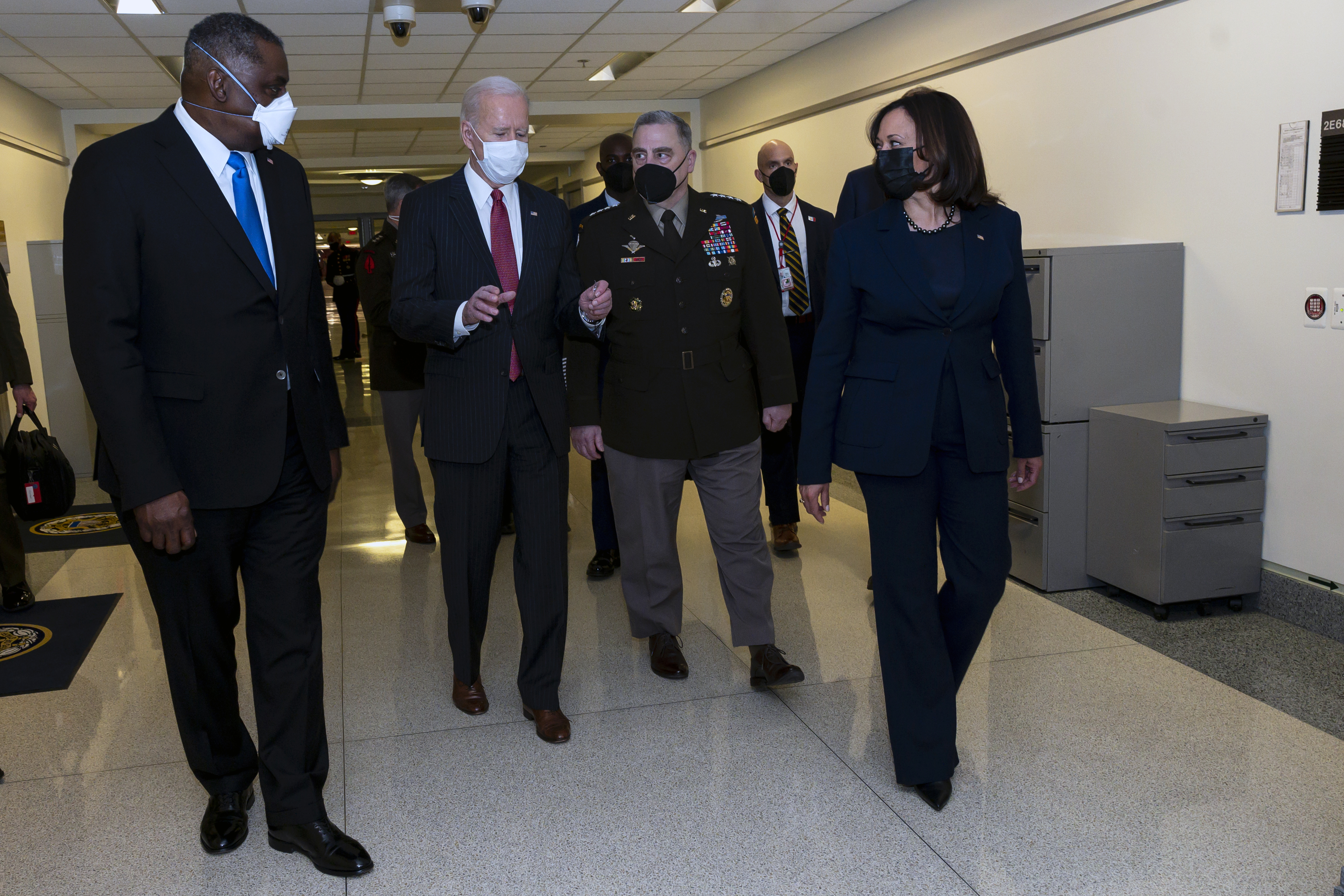
Milley, President Joe Biden, Vice President Kamala Harris and Secretary of Defense Lloyd Austin, February 10, 2021

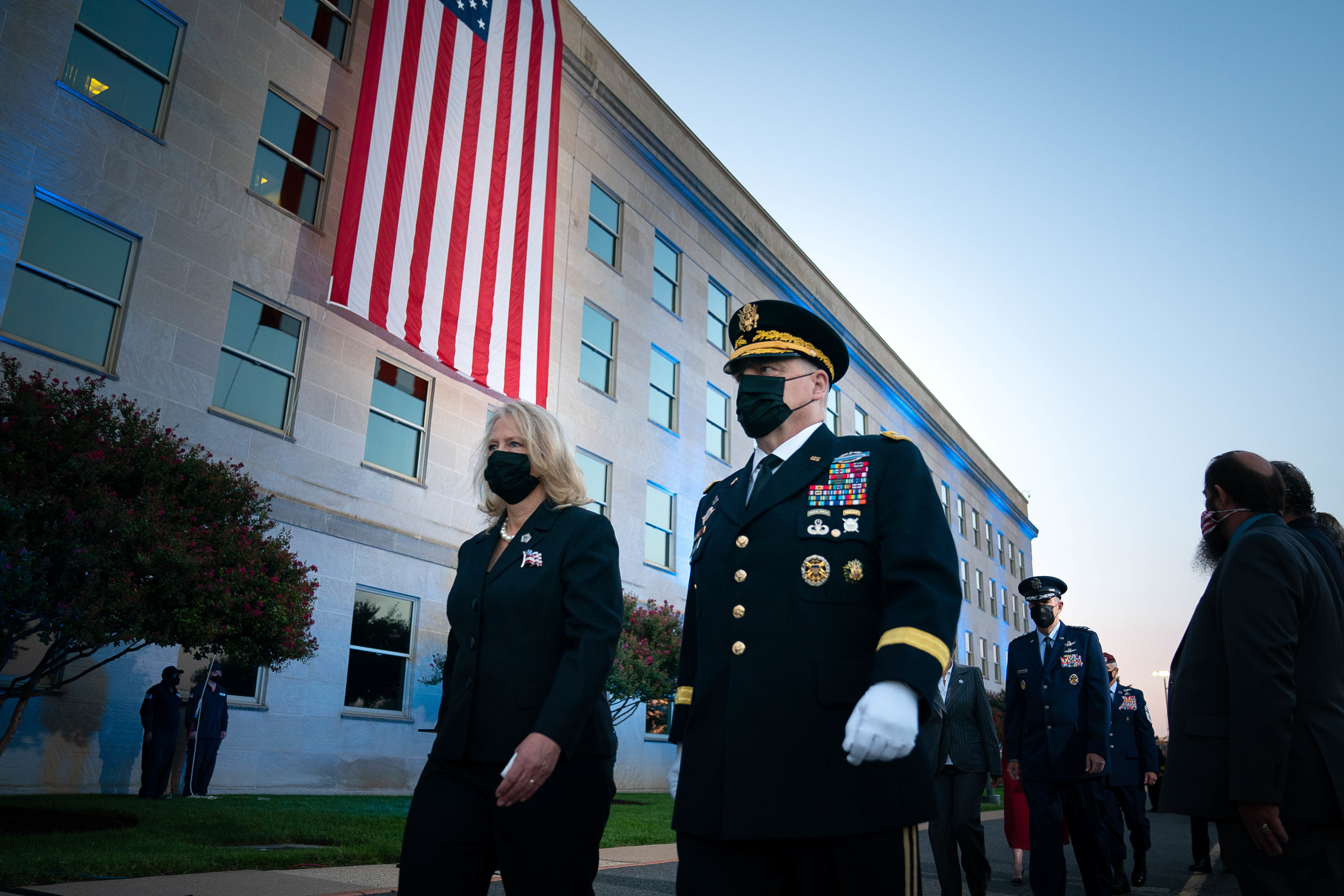
Milley and his wife Hollyanne attend a sunrise flag unfurling ceremony on the west side of the Pentagon on 11 September 2021, the 20th anniversary of 9/11.

Upon the inauguration of Joe Biden as president in January 2021, Milley was invited to remain in his position of Chairman of the Joint Chiefs of Staff and accepted the offer. He ceremonially relinquished office as chairman to General Charles Q. Brown Jr. on 29 September 2023, and his term officially ended on 30 September.

In June 2021, a report from an Associated Press investigation found that at least 1,900 U.S. military firearms were recorded as lost or stolen in the last 10 years, most of them by the U.S. Army. Some of them were later used in violent crimes; in one case, stolen automatic rifles were sold to a California street gang. Reports say that when Milley learned of the scandal, he was shocked, and stated he would consider a more systematic fix on how the military keeps track of its firearms. However, some claim that Milley actually downplayed the report of 1,900 lost or stolen military firearms.

In November 2022, Milley urged Russia and Ukraine to find a "political solution" to the Russo-Ukrainian War, saying that the war in Ukraine is unwinnable by purely military means. In February 2023, Milley said that Russia had lost "strategically, operationally and tactically" and that it was "paying an enormous price on the battlefield" in Ukraine.

===== Defense of non-partisan military =====
On 30 June 2021, Trump suggested that Milley should resign, implying that he was unwilling "to defend [the US military] from the Leftist Radicals who hate [the United States] and [its flag]". This came after Milley's defense of studying a broad range of ideas including "critical race theory" and news reports that Milley and Trump engaged in a shouting match over military involvement in the 2020–2021 US race protests. Trump previously denied the incident and accused Milley of falsifying it.

On 23 June 2021, Milley attracted notice for telling Florida Republican Congressman Matt Gaetz that he found it "offensive" that the U.S. military was being characterized as "woke" for including "critical race theory" in its West Point curriculum and that he wanted "to understand white rage – and I'm white. What is it that caused thousands of people to assault this building and try to overturn the Constitution of the United States of America?"

In their September 2021 book, Peril, Washington Post reporters Bob Woodward and Robert Costa wrote that after the election Milley had become aware of a Trump military order to withdraw all troops from Afghanistan by 15 January 2021, which had been written by two Trump loyalists without consultation with national security officials. The authors reported that after Trump refused to concede his election loss, CIA director Gina Haspel told Milley, "We are on the way to a right-wing coup" and was worried Trump might attack Iran. In remarks before the Senate Armed Services Committee on September 28, Milley denied that he agreed in a call with Nancy Pelosi that Trump was "crazy" as stated in the book, stating that he was "not qualified to determine the mental health of the president of the United States".

===== Threats from Trump =====
In September 2023, Trump stated in a post on Truth Social that Milley's call to Chinese authorities following the storming of the United States Capitol attack was "an act so egregious that, in times gone by, the punishment would have been DEATH". In response to the threat, Milley stated, "I'll take appropriate measures to ensure my safety and the safety of my family". In 2024, Milley said he feared being court-martialed if Trump were to be reelected. He also called Trump the "most dangerous person ever" and said that Trump was a "fascist to the core". On 19 January 2025, Biden issued preemptive pardons to Milley and other officials, stating that they "should not be mistaken as an acknowledgment that any individual engaged in any wrongdoing, nor should acceptance be misconstrued as an admission of guilt for any offense".

===== Withdrawal from Afghanistan =====
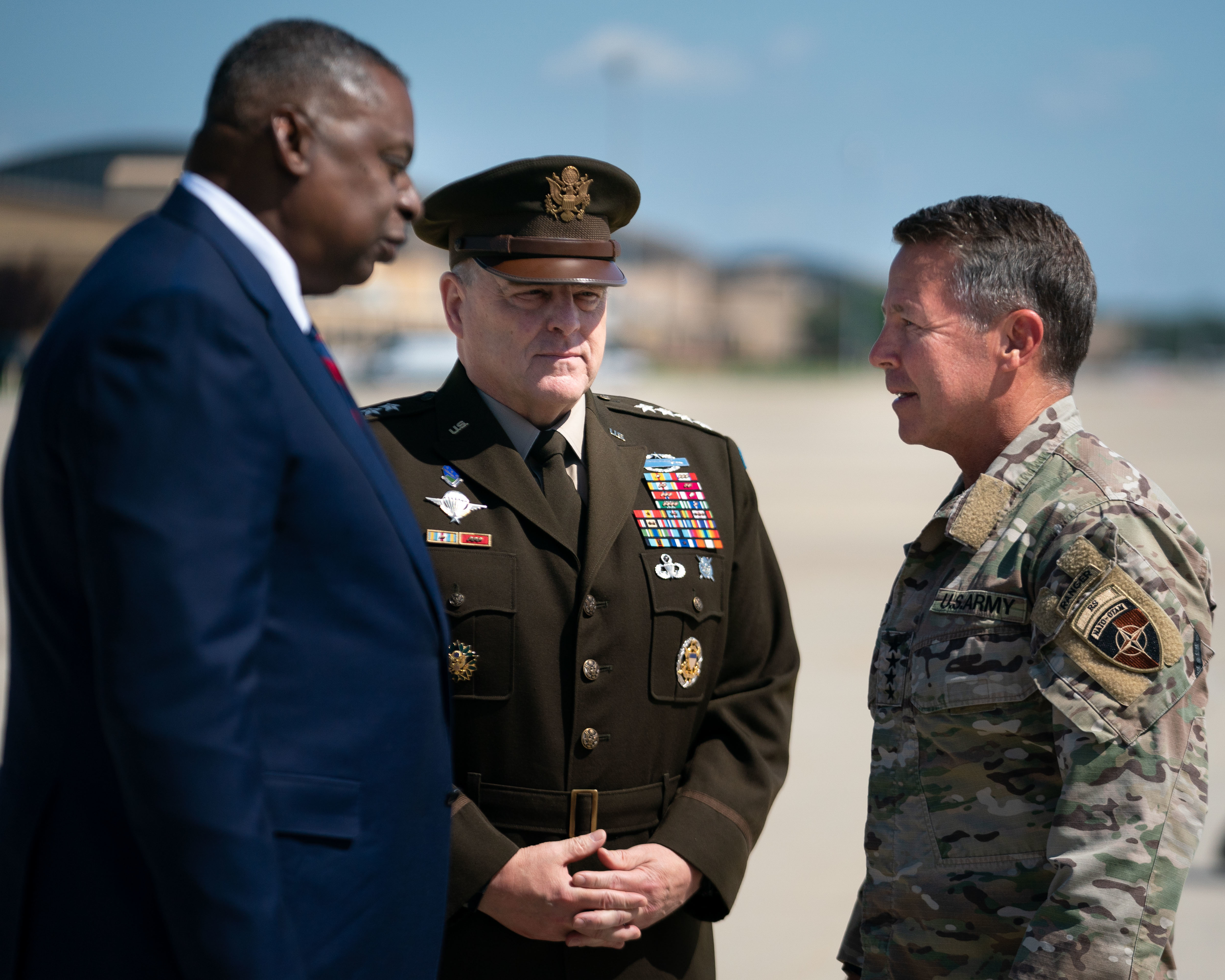
Milley and Defense Secretary Lloyd Austin welcome General "Scott" Miller at Joint Base Andrews during the 2021 Afghanistan withdrawal on July 14, 2021.

In December 2020, Milley met with the Taliban in Doha in an effort to arrange peace talks between the Taliban and the Afghan government. Milley believed that U.S. troops should remain in Afghanistan to prevent another terrorist attack like the September 11 attacks.

As the withdrawal of U.S. troops was in its final days, the Taliban launched an offensive against the Afghan government, quickly advancing in front of a collapsing Afghan Armed Forces. U.S. intelligence believed that the Afghan government would likely collapse within six months after the withdrawal of NATO troops from the country. On 21 July 2021, Milley reported that half of all districts in Afghanistan were under Taliban control and that momentum was "sort of" on the side of the Taliban. Kabul was captured by the Taliban on 15 August 2021, prompting an international airlift of civilians at Kabul International Airport, which remained under temporary U.S. and NATO control.

On 26 August 2021, after the suicide bombing at Kabul Airport that led to the death of 183 people, including 13 U.S. service members, Republican senators and members of the House called for the resignation of President Biden, Vice President Harris, Secretary of State Blinken, Defense Secretary Austin, and Milley.

In late September 2021, Milley, at hearings before both the Senate and House Armed Services Committees said that the withdrawal from Afghanistan and evacuation from Kabul was "a logistical success but a strategic failure". He rejected demands from Republican committee members to resign. On an 25 October 2024 podcast with Joe Rogan, when talking about the withdrawal from Afghanistan, Donald Trump claimed that Milley said "It's cheaper to leave it" in regard to the military equipment they had in Afghanistan and what to do with it when the US military left.

=== Actions of the second Trump administration ===
Hours after Trump was inaugurated as the 47th president of the United States on 20 January 2025, Milley's official portrait was removed from a Pentagon corridor where the portraits of all former chiefs are displayed. The next day workers patched the holes and painted the wall. A U.S. official told the New York Times that the White House had ordered the removal.

On 29 January, Defense Secretary Pete Hegseth suspended Milley's security clearance, withdrew the authorization for his security detail, and ordered a review of his actions as Chairman of the Joint Chiefs of Staff with a view to demote him in rank.

=== Operational deployments ===
Milley has deployed for various military operations, including:

- Multinational Force and Observers, Sinai, Egypt
- Operation Just Cause, Panama
- Operation Uphold Democracy, Haiti
- Operation Joint Endeavor, Bosnia-Herzegovina
- Operation Iraqi Freedom, Iraq
- Operation Enduring Freedom, Afghanistan

=== Service summary ===
==== Dates of rank ====
Promotions
Insignia	Rank	Date
	Second lieutenant	10 June 1980
	First lieutenant	28 November 1981
	Captain	1 March 1984
	Major	1 May 1992
	Lieutenant colonel	1 August 1996
	Colonel	1 April 2002
	Brigadier general	2 June 2008
	Major general	2 March 2011
	Lieutenant general	20 December 2012
	General	15 August 2014

==== Summary of assignments ====
Begin	End	Assignment	Duty station
1980	1984	Student, United States Naval War College	Newport, Rhode Island
2000	2002	Assistant Chief of Staff (G3), later Chief of Staff, 25th Infantry Division (Light)	Schofield Barracks, Hawaii
2002	2002	Commander, US Provisional Brigade/Task Force Eagle, 25th Infantry Division (Light), Multinational Division (North)	Tuzla, Bosnia and Herzegovina
2002	2003	Deputy Chief of Staff for Transformation (G-7), 25th Infantry Division (Light)	Schofield Barracks, Hawaii
2003	2005	Commander, 2nd Brigade Combat Team, 10th Mountain Division (Light)	Fort Drum, New York
2005	2006	Chief, Global Force Management Division, later Assistant Deputy Director for Joint Operations (J-3), Joint Staff	The Pentagon, Washington, D.C.
2006	2007	Military Assistant to the Secretary of Defense, Office of the Secretary of Defense	The Pentagon, Washington, D.C.
July 2007	June 2009	Deputy Commanding General (Operations), 101st Airborne Division (Air Assault)	Fort Campbell, Kentucky
June 2009	November 2011	Deputy Director for Regional Operations (J-3), Joint Staff	The Pentagon, Washington, D.C.
4 November 2011	3 December 2012	Commanding General, 10th Mountain Division (Light)	Fort Drum, New York
20 December 2012	August 2014	Commanding General, III Corps and Fort Hood; concurrently Commander, International Security Assistance Force Joint Command and Deputy Commander, United States Forces-Afghanistan	Fort Hood, Texas
15 August 2014	10 August 2015	Commanding General, United States Army Forces Command	Fort Bragg, North Carolina
14 August 2015	9 August 2019	Chief of Staff of the United States Army	The Pentagon, Washington, D.C.
1 October 2019	30 September 2023	Chairman of the Joint Chiefs of Staff	The Pentagon, Washington, D.C.

== Post-military (2023–present) ==
Milley joined the faculties of Georgetown University and Princeton University in February 2024. At Georgetown, he will mentor students as a distinguished fellow in residence with the Security Studies Program in the School of Foreign Service. The Princeton School of Public and International Affairs (SPIA) appointed him the Charles and Marie Robertson visiting professor and lecturer from February 2024 until June 2025. He also became a senior adviser to JPMorgan Chase bank and joined the Harry Walker Agency, a speakers' agency.

== Personal life ==
Milley and Hollyanne Haas (born 19 January 1965) were married in May 1985. They have two children. Hollyanne is a nurse who worked in critical care for 18 years and then in cardiac nursing for 15, currently in Northern Virginia. At the 2020 Veterans Day ceremony at Arlington National Cemetery, she administered CPR to a veteran who had collapsed, saving his life.

=== Presidential pardon ===
President Biden granted a Full and Unconditional Pardon to Milley on January 19, 2025.

On January 19, 2025, President Joe Biden preemptively granted clemency to Milley, giving him protection from future potential prosecution by the incoming Trump administration. At midnight (20–21 January), Trump announced on Truth Social that he was firing Milley from the National Infrastructure Advisory Council, along with three Biden appointees.

== Awards and decorations ==
General Milley has received these awards:

Right breast		Left breast		
506th Infantry Regiment Distinctive Unit Insignia		Combat Infantryman Badge (2nd Award)		
French Parachutist Badge			Defense Distinguished Service Medal with two oak leaf clusters	
Joint Meritorious Unit; Award with oak leaf cluster	Army Meritorious Unit; Commendation with three oak leaf clusters	Army Distinguished Service Medal with four oak leaf clusters	Navy Distinguished Service Medal	Air Force Distinguished Service Medal
101st Airborne Division Combat Service Identification Badge		Defense Superior Service Medal with two oak leaf clusters	Legion of Merit with two oak leaf clusters	Bronze Star Medal with three oak leaf clusters
101st Airborne Division Combat Service Identification Badge		Meritorious Service Medal with silver oak leaf cluster	Army Commendation Medal with four oak leaf clusters	Army Achievement Medal with oak leaf cluster
		National Defense Service Medal with service star	Armed Forces Expeditionary Medal with two service stars	Afghanistan Campaign Medal with three campaign star
		Iraq Campaign Medal with two campaign stars	Global War on Terrorism Expeditionary Medal	Global War on Terrorism Service Medal
		Korea Defense Service Medal	Humanitarian Service Medal	Army Service Ribbon
		Army Overseas Service Ribbon with award numeral 6	NATO Medal for service with ISAF with service star	Multinational Force and Observers Medal
		French National Order of Merit, Commander	Order of the British Empire, Honorary Knight Commander (Military Division) (KBE)	Order of Australia, Honorary Officer (Military Division) (AO)
		Special Forces Tab		Ranger Tab
		Master Parachutist Badge		Special Operations Diver Badge
		Joint Chiefs of Staff Identification Badge		United States Army Staff Identification Badge

Other awards
Presidential Commendation (Trump)
Expert Infantryman Badge
10 Overseas Service Bars

== Works ==
=== Articles ===
- America Isn't Ready for the Wars of the Future, Foreign Affairs, 5 August 2024 (co-authored with Eric Schmidt)

Military offices
Preceded by James Terry	Commanding General of the 10th Mountain Division; 2011–2012	Succeeded by Stephen Townsend
Preceded by Donald Campbell	Commanding General of III Corps; 2012–2014	Succeeded by Sean MacFarland
Preceded by James Terry	Commanding General of ISAF-Joint Command; 2013–2014	Succeeded by Joseph Anderson
Preceded by Daniel Allyn	Commanding General of United States Army Forces Command; 2014–2015	Succeeded by Robert B. Abrams
Preceded by Raymond T. Odierno	Chief of Staff of the United States Army; 2015–2019	Succeeded by James C. McConville
Preceded by Joseph Dunford	Chairman of the Joint Chiefs of Staff; 2019–2023	Succeeded by Charles Q. Brown Jr.
U.S. order of precedence (ceremonial)
Preceded by Joseph Dunford as former Chair of the Joint Chiefs of Staff	Order of precedence of the United States as former Chair of the Joint Chiefs of Staff	Succeeded by Charles Q. Brown Jr. as former Chair of the Joint Chiefs of Staff
