= I Alone Can Fix It =

2021 book about Donald Trump's presidency

I Alone Can Fix It: Donald J. Trump's Catastrophic Final Year
- Author: Carol D. Leonnig and Philip Rucker
- Subjects: Presidency of Donald Trump; COVID-19 pandemic in the United States
- Genre: Non-fiction
- Published: July 20, 2021
- Publisher: Penguin Press
- Publication place: United States
- Media type: Print, e-book, audiobook
- Pages: 592
- ISBN: 9780593298947

I Alone Can Fix It: Donald J. Trump's Catastrophic Final Year is a nonfiction book written by Washington Post reporters Carol D. Leonnig and Philip Rucker. It was published by Penguin Press in 2021 and was a New York Times bestseller. I Alone Can Fix It is a follow-up to the two authors' 2020 book A Very Stable Genius and covers Donald Trump's last year in office during his first term as president of the United States. As David Smith of The Guardian newspaper pointed out, "both titles are direct Trump quotations loaded with irony." The authors interviewed 140 people for their material, including a two-and-a-half-hour interview with Trump himself. The book has generally received positive reviews by book critics.

== Content ==
The book begins on New Year's Eve 2019, with an email from a U.S. Centers for Disease Control scientist stationed in Beijing to CDC Director Robert Redfield, informing him about cases of unusual pneumonia in the city of Wuhan. It proceeds through the events of 2020—Trump's first impeachment, the spread of COVID-19, the Black Lives Matter protests, the 2020 election and its aftermath—from the perspective of how they impacted Trump and his presidency. Press coverage of the book called particular attention to its depiction of General Mark A. Milley, the chairman of the Joint Chiefs of Staff, and Milley's efforts to prevent what he feared was a potential coup d'état attempt by Trump. The press also made note of Trump's boast to the authors that if it had not been for the pandemic, even George Washington and Abraham Lincoln could not have beaten him in the election. The book describes Trump "dressing down and humiliating those around him, including former Attorney General William P. Barr."

== Reviews ==
Smith, reviewing the book for The Guardian, wrote that the authors "have unleashed a second startling story of incompetence and malevolence in the White House." David Green, also in The Guardian, called the book "essential reading", "a blockbuster follow-up to A Very Stable Genius." Dwight Garner, reviewing for The New York Times, said the book "reads like 300 daily newspaper articles taped together" and called it a "grueling" read, "a dense, just-the-facts scrapbook of a dismal year" that included an "almost day-by-day accounting of Trump’s last year in office, from the fumbled Covid response to the second impeachment to Rudy Giuliani's public self-immolations." Garner viewed Michael Wolff's Landslide: The Final Days of the Trump Presidency, released around the same time, as a "more vivid and apt" work. Ron Elving of NPR said that in recounting conversations and thoughts of the participants, Rucker and Leonnig convey "a compelling sense of almost novelistic omniscience, as though the authors had been present and taking notes in a host of conversations they never heard." Mabinty Quarshie, writing in USA Today, said the book makes "a detailed case... that the catastrophe of 2020 was a result of Trump's proclivity to put political optics above all else, including American lives."

== See also ==
- List of The New York Times number-one books of 2021
