= Daniel Gabriel =

Daniel Gabriel may refer to:

- Dan Gabriel, American documentary filmmaker
- Daniel Llambrich Gabriel (born 1975), Spanish swimmer
