= Um Hanadi =

Iraqi fighter (born 1978)

- Born: Wahida Mohamed al-Jumaily; 1978 (age 47–48)
- Military career
- Allegiance: Iraq
- Branch: Popular Mobilization Forces
- Rank: Iraqi military commander
- Nickname: Um Hanadi

Wahida Mohamed al-Jumaily (born 1978), better known as Um Hanadi, is an Iraqi fighter and commander of the Popular Mobilization Forces (PMF) who fought against Islamic State of Iraq and the Levant in the Al-Shirqat District. She is the only female commander in the PMF and leads her own unit in the district. She lost two husbands to ISIL and is known for her brutality against ISIL fighters. She was feature in the documentary Mosul directed by Dan Gabriel.

== Career ==
Hanadi is from Tikrit and is Sunni, but serves in a Shia militia. She has been fighting terrorism since 2004 and attracted the attention of ISIL. Three of her brothers, her father, and both her first and second husband were killed by ISIL. She claimed she was "at the top of their most wanted list" and has had multiple car bomb assassination attempts on her on life. Hanadi operated an 70 to 80 man unit in the Al-Shirqat District and played a vital role in driving ISIL out of the district.

She is known for her brutality against ISIL and has been accused of cooking the heads of ISIL fighters. She was claimed to have said "I fought them. I beheaded them. I cooked their heads, I burned their bodies". When she was later featured in the 2019 documentary Mosul, she denied cooking the head of dead ISIL fighters saying it was a rumor spread about her, but admitted to desecrating and photographing their corpses to show the deceased fighters' family members.

== See also ==
- Abu Azrael
