= David Jensen (ice hockey, born 1965) =

American ice hockey player

- Born: August 19, 1965 (age 60) Needham, Massachusetts, U.S.
- Height: 6 ft 1 in (185 cm)
- Weight: 195 lb (88 kg; 13 st 13 lb)
- Shot: Left
- Played for: Hartford Whalers; Washington Capitals; Boston Bruins
- National team: United States
- NHL draft: 20th overall, 1983; Hartford Whalers
- Playing career: 1984–1992

David Allen Jensen (born August 19, 1965) is an American former professional ice hockey player. He appeared in 105 National Hockey League regular season games between 1984 and 1990.

== Early life ==
Jensen was born and raised in Needham, Massachusetts. As a youth, he played in the 1978 Quebec International Pee-Wee Hockey Tournament with a minor ice hockey team from Boston.

Jensen entered Belmont Hill School as a freshman and transferred to Lawrence Academy for his junior year, graduating in 1984.

== Career ==
Jensen was selected in the first round of the 1983 NHL entry draft (20th overall) as a 17-year-old by Hartford Whalers.

Jensen played with the United States men's national ice hockey team in 1983–84 as an amateur and was a member of the Olympic team that played in the 1984 Winter Olympic Games in Sarajevo.

== Career statistics ==
=== Regular season and playoffs ===
			Regular season					Playoffs
Season	Team	League	GP	G	A	Pts	PIM	GP	G	A	Pts	PIM
1980–81	Belmont Hill School	HS-MA	—	—	—	—	—	—	—	—	—	—
1981–82	Belmont Hill School	HS-MA	—	—	—	—	—	—	—	—	—	—
1982–83	Lawrence Academy	HS-MA	25	41	59	99	—	—	—	—	—	—
1983–84	United States National Team	Intl	61	32	56	88	36	—	—	—	—	—
1984–85	Hartford Whalers	NHL	23	8	10	18	16	—	—	—	—	—
1985–86	Washington Capitals	NHL	25	10	10	20	26	4	1	1	2	5
1985–86	Binghamton Whalers	AHL	41	27	39	66	24
1986–87	Washington Capitals	NHL	46	14	18	32	36	7	2	3	5	9
1986–87	Binghamton Whalers	AHL	6	4	6	10	12	—	—	—	—	—
1987–88	Washington Capitals	NHL	5	2	2	4	4	—	—	—	—	—
1988–89	Boston Bruins	NHL	4	2	2	4	8	—	—	—	—	—
1989–90	Boston Bruins	NHL	2	1	2	3	4	—	—	—	—	—
1990–91	SG Cortina	ITA	35	27	28	55	48	—	—	—	—	—
1991–92	Maine Mariners	AHL	15	12	10	22	22	—	—	—	—	—
NHL totals			105	37	44	81	94	11	3	4	7	14
AHL totals			62	43	59	102	58	4	4	4	8	12

=== International ===
Year	Team	Event	GP	G	A	Pts	PIM
1984	United States	OLY	6	5	5	10	4
1984	United States	CC	6	2	2	4	2
1992	United States	WC	6	3	3	6	4
Senior totals			18	10	10	20	10
