= Richard Jarvis (American football) =

American football player (born 1995)

Profile
- Position: Linebacker

Personal information
- Born: April 20, 1995 (age 31); Watertown, Massachusetts
- Listed height: 6 ft 2 in (1.88 m)
- Listed weight: 236 lb (107 kg)

Career information
- High school: Belmont Hill (MA)
- College: Brown
- NFL draft: 2018: undrafted

Career history
- Atlanta Falcons (2018); Jacksonville Jaguars (2018)*; Buffalo Bills (2018)*
- * Offseason or practice squad member only
- Stats at Pro Football Reference

Richard "Dewey" Jarvis (born April 20, 1995) is an American former football linebacker. He played college football at Brown.

== Professional career ==
=== Atlanta Falcons ===
Jarvis signed with the Atlanta Falcons as an undrafted free agent on May 1, 2018. After making the Falcons' initial 53-man roster, Jarvis was waived on September 6, 2018 and was re-signed to the practice squad. He was promoted back to the active roster on September 22, 2018. He was waived again on September 25, 2018.

=== Jacksonville Jaguars ===
On October 23, 2018, Jarvis was signed to the Jacksonville Jaguars practice squad. He was released on November 15, 2018.

=== Buffalo Bills ===
On November 19, 2018, Jarvis was signed to the Buffalo Bills practice squad.
