= Mosul (2019 documentary film) =

2019 war documentary film

- Film poster
- Directed by: Dan Gabriel
- Written by: Daniel Gabriel; Mike Tucker
- Produced by: Matt Schrader
- Cinematography: Hussein Alla; Ayhab Awaad; Khalid Al Bayatti; Riyadh Gheni; Anas Al Taiee
- Edited by: Christopher Campbell
- Music by: Photek
- Production company: Two Rivers Pictures
- Distributed by: Gravitas Ventures
- Release date: May 14, 2019
- Running time: 86 minutes
- Country: United States
- Languages: English; Arabic

Mosul is a 2019 American war documentary film about the battle to reclaim the Iraqi city of Mosul from the Islamic State of Iraq and the Levant (ISIL) from 2016 to 2017.

== Overview ==
The film is the directorial debut from Dan Gabriel, who worked in the region as a CIA counter-terrorism officer, and also produced the film. The film focuses on the intersecting narratives of the various Iraqi ethnic groups that were involved in the operation: Sunni tribesman, Shiite militias, Christian fighters, and Kurdish Peshmerga forces. The eyewitness footage was captured over nine months by a camera crew embedded with various units of the Iraqi forces. The film follows Iraqi journalist Ali Maula who is embedded with the militia, along with war widow Um Hanadi, and ISIS recruiter Nasser Issa. Others that appear in footage of Maula's interviews include Captain Alaa Atah of the Iraqi Emergency Response Brigade and Sheikh "The Crocodile" Saleh.

== Release ==
Mosul premiered at the 2019 Cleveland International Film Festival. The official release date for digital distribution is May 14, 2019, by Gravitas Ventures. The film's original score was composed by Grammy-nominated British record producer Photek. The documentary is 86 minutes long. The original score was written by Photek.

== Reception ==
On Rotten Tomatoes the film has an approval rating of 83% based on reviews from six critics.

Film Inquiry wrote, "Gritty, powerful and honest, the film begs to be experienced, discussed, and remembered." Michael Rechtshaffen of the Los Angeles Times said "while not exactly uncharted documentary territory, the Iraq conflict is thought-provokingly portrayed in 'Mosul'." Laura DeMarco called the film "a gripping narrative of life during 'total warfare'."
