= A Very Stable Genius =

2020 book about Donald Trump

A Very Stable Genius: Donald J. Trump's Testing of America
- Cover of first edition
- Author: Philip Rucker; Carol Leonnig
- Language: English
- Subject: Presidency of Donald Trump
- Publisher: Penguin Press (US), Bloomsbury Publishing (UK)
- Publication date: January 21, 2020
- Publication place: United States
- Media type: Print (hardcover)
- Pages: 465
- ISBN: 9781984877499

A Very Stable Genius: Donald J. Trump's Testing of America is a 2020 book by journalists Philip Rucker and Carol Leonnig. The book presents an account of the first three years of the first presidency of Donald Trump. It focuses on specific incidents of conflict with senior advisors, including former Secretary of State Rex Tillerson and former Secretary of Defense Jim Mattis. A Very Stable Genius ranked first on bestseller lists from The New York Times, USA Today, and Publishers Weekly, and received generally positive reviews in international media.

== Background ==
The title refers to a phrase Trump repeatedly used to describe himself, starting in January 2018 when a book, Fire and Fury, raised questions about his mental stability. Responding in a series of tweets, he said "Actually, throughout my life, my two greatest assets have been mental stability and being, like, really smart" and that his achievements in life qualified him as "not smart, but genius....and a very stable genius at that!" He described himself as "a very stable genius" on multiple subsequent occasions.

Rucker and Leonnig have suggested that A Very Stable Genius is an effort to make sense of conflicting images of Donald Trump as "a success, a master in some ways, and also a chaotic, undisciplined, impulsive leader". The book draws on more than 200 interviews with sources, who are not named in the book. The authors requested an interview from Trump, but he declined.

== Content ==
The book is organized around specific episodes of conflict within the Trump administration, under chapter titles that include "Unhinged", "Shocking the Conscience", and "Paranoia and Pandemonium". For example, the book highlights a July 2017 meeting at the Pentagon at which Secretary of State Rex Tillerson and Secretary of Defense Jim Mattis, among other senior advisors and generals, attempted to brief the president on the current state and projection of military power, with Trump responding negatively to their approach and reportedly calling them "losers", "dopes", and "babies", then abruptly leaving the meeting, prompting Tillerson to reportedly refer to him as a "fucking moron". In another episode, Trump reportedly tried to undo the Foreign Corrupt Practices Act, saying it's "just so unfair that American companies aren't allowed to pay bribes to get business overseas." When Tillerson told him it would need action by Congress, Trump reportedly instructed an aide to draft an executive action to repeal the law.

The authors document a pattern in which Trump fired any and all advisors who tried to educate him or restrain his impulses – the so-called "grownups in the room" – replacing them with advisors who "think their mission is to tell him, 'Yes.'" The book suggests that this consistent pattern of reliance on personal loyalty, combined with a disregard for consequences, has placed Trump in opposition to conventional democratic power structures in Washington, D.C., with apparently chaotic results. Rucker and Leonnig particularly criticize Robert Mueller and his report on possible obstruction of justice, which they cite as an example of how bureaucracy and fact-finding have failed to provide effective external restraints on Trump's behavior.

The book also highlights apparent gaps in the president's geopolitical knowledge, relating a story about a meeting with Indian prime minister Narendra Modi in which the American president reportedly claimed, incorrectly, that India and China do not share a border. Another account describes him visiting Pearl Harbor and the USS Arizona Memorial while apparently having no understanding of what actually happened there.

== Release ==
In a 2018 article on the publishing market for books about Donald Trump, Steven Perlberg of BuzzFeed News reported that Rucker and Leonnig were collaborating on a new Trump book, and that unnamed reporters covering the president had "been approached with the promise of large six-figure advances". North American rights to the book were purchased by Penguin Press, while UK and Commonwealth rights were purchased by Bloomsbury Publishing. US and UK editions were scheduled for simultaneous publication on January 21, 2020.

Four days before the book's official release date, the Washington Post published an excerpt from the book highlighting Trump's confrontation with Secretary of State Tillerson and Secretary of Defense Mattis. One day prior to the book's release, Trump accused Rucker and Leonnig of fabricating most of the stories in A Very Stable Genius, calling the authors "two stone cold losers". A German translation, titled Trump gegen die Demokratie (lit. Trump against Democracy), was published by S. Fischer Verlag on the same release date as the English version.

== Reception ==
Reviews of the book have been positive, with special praise for the detail of the authors' research. In The New York Times, Dwight Garner called the authors "meticulous journalists", noting that "this taut and terrifying book is among the most closely observed accounts of Donald J. Trump's shambolic tenure in office to date." Writing for The Guardian, Lloyd Green called the book "richly sourced and highly readable", and observed that it provided a contrasting, "unsettling" account in comparison to other "tell-all or third-party confessional" books. Comparing the book to Fire and Fury, Rieke Havertz of Die Zeit observed that the detailed factual portrayal of disturbing incidents in the Trump White House made the book read like a political thriller.

Criticism of A Very Stable Genius has focused on sourcing and the overall purpose of the book. In The Washington Post, Joe Klein noted that the book's uneven sourcing made some portrayals of key figures less convincing than expected, but generally praised the book for showing that Trump "has created his own ideology and his own party". Writing for The Times, Justin Webb criticized the tone and purpose of A Very Stable Genius, suggesting that the authors should have spent their time investigating infighting within the Democratic Party instead of writing "another of these breathless inside-the-Trump-White-House takes", but noted that the book was nonetheless useful for understanding Trump. Peter Spiegel's review for the Financial Times also questioned the purpose of writing another detailed book that recounted well-known information about the administration, but ultimately concluded that the book provided a necessary reminder to readers that Trump's behavior is "aberrant".

In its first week of release, A Very Stable Genius placed first on The New York Times Best Seller list in the hardcover nonfiction category, and first overall on the USA Today bestseller list. The book also placed first on the Publishers Weekly bestseller list for print books, and sold over 120,000 copies in all formats.
