= Philip Rucker =

American journalist

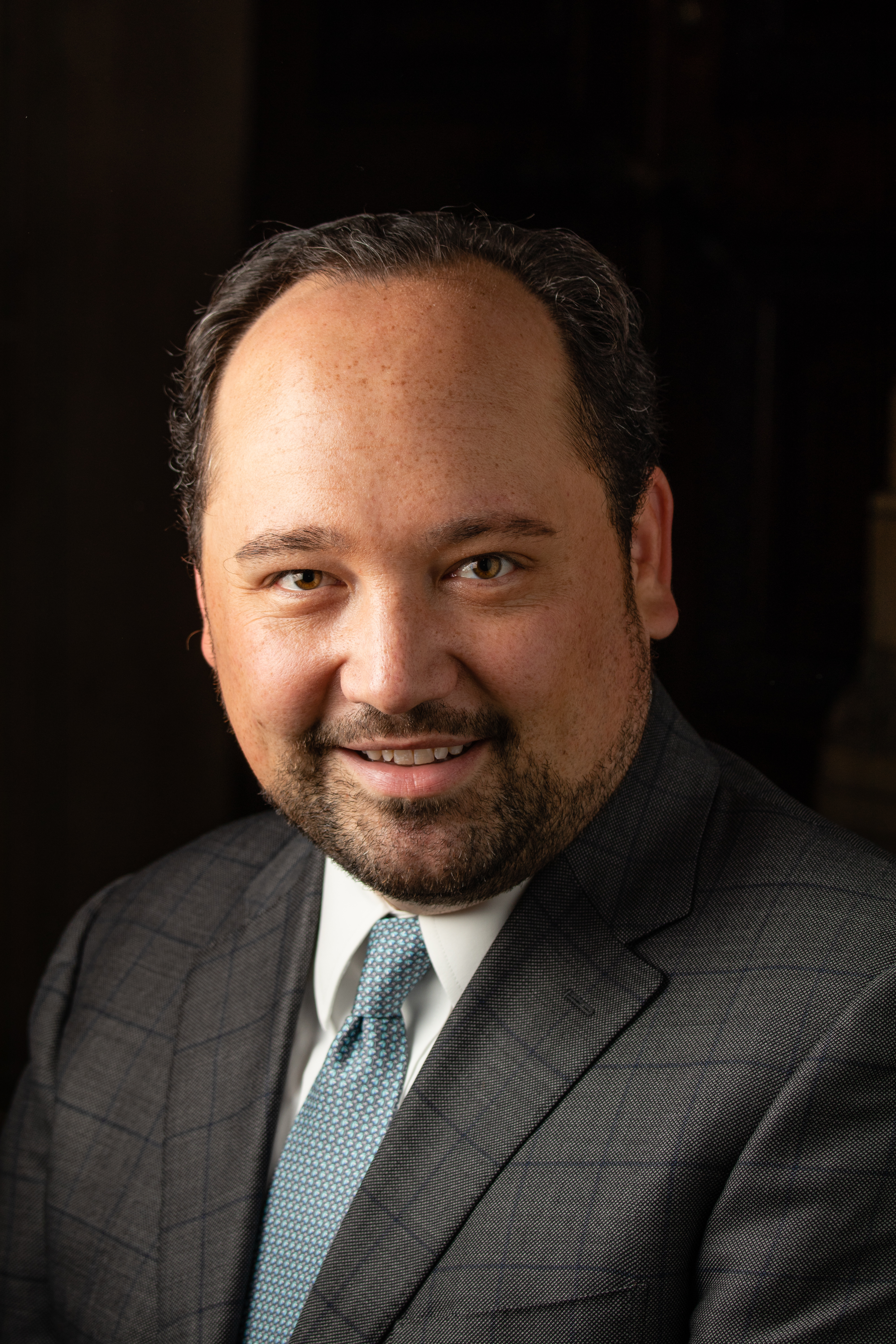
- Occupation: Journalist
- Website: www.washingtonpost.com/people/philip-rucker/

Philip Rucker is an American reporter and author. Since January 2025, he has been CNN Senior Vice President, Editorial Strategy and News. Prior to 2025, he was the National Editor at The Washington Post.

== Early life and education ==
Rucker is a 2002 graduate of the St. Andrew's School in Savannah, Georgia, where he was valedictorian. In 2017, the school gave him its Distinguished Alumni Award. Rucker received a history degree from Yale University in 2006, where he worked for the Yale Daily News as a reporter and editor.

== Career ==
On Jan 21, 2025, CNN announced, “Pulitzer Prize winning journalist Philip Rucker has joined CNN as SVP of Editorial Strategy and News.”

He had worked at the Post since 2005. Initially covering a variety of beats, he became a White House correspondent and later served as the White House bureau chief from 2014 to 2023. In 2023, he was promoted to national editor. He covered the entire Trump administration for the Post, as well as Trump's 2016 presidential campaign and Mitt Romney's 2012 presidential campaign. He is also a political analyst for NBC News and MSNBC and a regular guest on PBS news shows. Jim Wertz, the chairman of the Erie County Democratic Party, called him "one of Washington, D.C.'s most respected journalists."

He is the co-author, with his Post colleague Carol Leonnig, of two best-selling books about the Trump administration. The first, A Very Stable Genius. is an insider account of the first three years of Trump's presidency. The second, I Alone Can Fix It, covers Trump's final year in office and its immediate aftermath.

== Awards ==
- He was part of the Washington Post staff that won the 2018 Pulitzer Prize for National Reporting for coverage of the Russian interference in the 2016 presidential election.
- He was part of the Washington Post staff that won a 2017 special George Polk Award for "revealing ties between the Trump campaign and Kremlin-connected Russians that gave rise to the investigation into possible collusion during the 2016 election."
- He and his Post colleague Ashley Parker shared the 2017 Gerald R. Ford Journalism Prize for Distinguished Reporting on the Presidency.

== Bibliography ==
- A Very Stable Genius: Donald J. Trump's Testing of America (2020) Penguin Press; ISBN 978-1-9848-7749-9; co-written with Carol Leonnig
- I Alone Can Fix It: Donald J. Trump's Catastrophic Final Year. Engels 2021, ISBN 978-0593300626; co-written with Carol Leonnig
