= John Hilton Knowles =

American cardiopulmonary physiologist (1926–1979)

- Born: May 23, 1926; Chicago, Illinois, U.S.
- Died: March 6, 1979 (aged 52); Boston, Massachusetts, U.S.
- Education: Harvard College (AB); Washington University School of Medicine (MD); University of Rochester Medical Center; University at Buffalo
- Known for: 9th president of the Rockefeller Foundation
- Scientific career
- Fields: Cardiovascular physiology

John Hilton Knowles (May 23, 1926 – March 6, 1979) was an American cardiopulmonary physiologist and physician who was most notable for being the eighth president of the Rockefeller Foundation from 1972 until his death from pancreatic cancer in 1979, and general director of the Massachusetts General Hospital from 1962 until 1972.

== Biography ==
=== Early life and education ===
Knowles was born on May 23, 1926, in Chicago to James Knowles (1896–1971), who was a flying ace in World War I and served as vice president of the Rexall Drug Company, and Jean Laurence Turnbull (1894–1982), an artist. Knowles grew up in Normandy, but when he was twelve he and his family moved to Belmont where he would attend Belmont High School. After graduating from high school, Knowles would enroll at Harvard College where he majored in biochemistry. Along with his classmate Jack Lemmon, he would play piano on the Harvard radio station. He graduated in 1947 completing his Bachelor of Arts. After being rejected by eleven medical schools, including the Harvard Medical School, he would enroll at the Washington University School of Medicine where he would be elected into the honor society Alpha Omega Alpha and graduated cum laude as Doctor of Medicine.

Knowles would start his medical internship at the Massachusetts General Hospital where he would meet Edith Morris LaCroix, a cytotechnologist, whom he would marry in 1953 and have six children with. From 1953 to 1955, Knowles would serve as lieutenant at the Naval Medical Center Portsmouth, where he would be in charge of the cardiopulmonary laboratory. From 1956 to 1957, he studied physiology at the University of Rochester Medical Center and University at Buffalo. He would also become a part of the faculty at the Harvard Medical School where he would later in 1969 become a professor of medicine.

=== Massachusetts General Hospital ===
In 1962 he became the general director of the Massachusetts General Hospital. One of the first things he did as general director was replacing wooden benches with comfortable chairs and also introduced nine coronary care units. He would also assign psychiatrists at schools, courts and social agencies including opening a medical station at the Logan International Airport for airport employees and passengers.

For five months in 1969 the Nixon administration unsuccessfully tried to elect Knowles into the Department of Health, Education, and Welfare and aroused opposition from the American Medical Association and from Senate Minority Leader Everett Dirksen, it was known as "the Knowles affair" by the media.

=== Rockefeller Foundation ===
In 1972, Knowles became the 9th president of the Rockefeller Foundation and in this position he established the International Agricultural Development Service. While president, he became a professor of medicine at the New York University Medical Center.

=== Later life and death ===
In December 1978, it was revealed that Knowles had developed a tumor in his pancreas. Knowles remained president and professor until his death on March 6, 1979, due to pancreatic cancer. He was honored at the Memorial Church of Harvard University by friends and family, including Jack Lemmon, and was eulogized by Theodore Hesburgh, Mary MacDonald, Richard Sears Humphrey and his eldest son John Hilton Jr., he was later buried at the Forest Hills Cemetery.
