= Carol D. Leonnig =

American investigative journalist

Carol Duhurst Leonnig
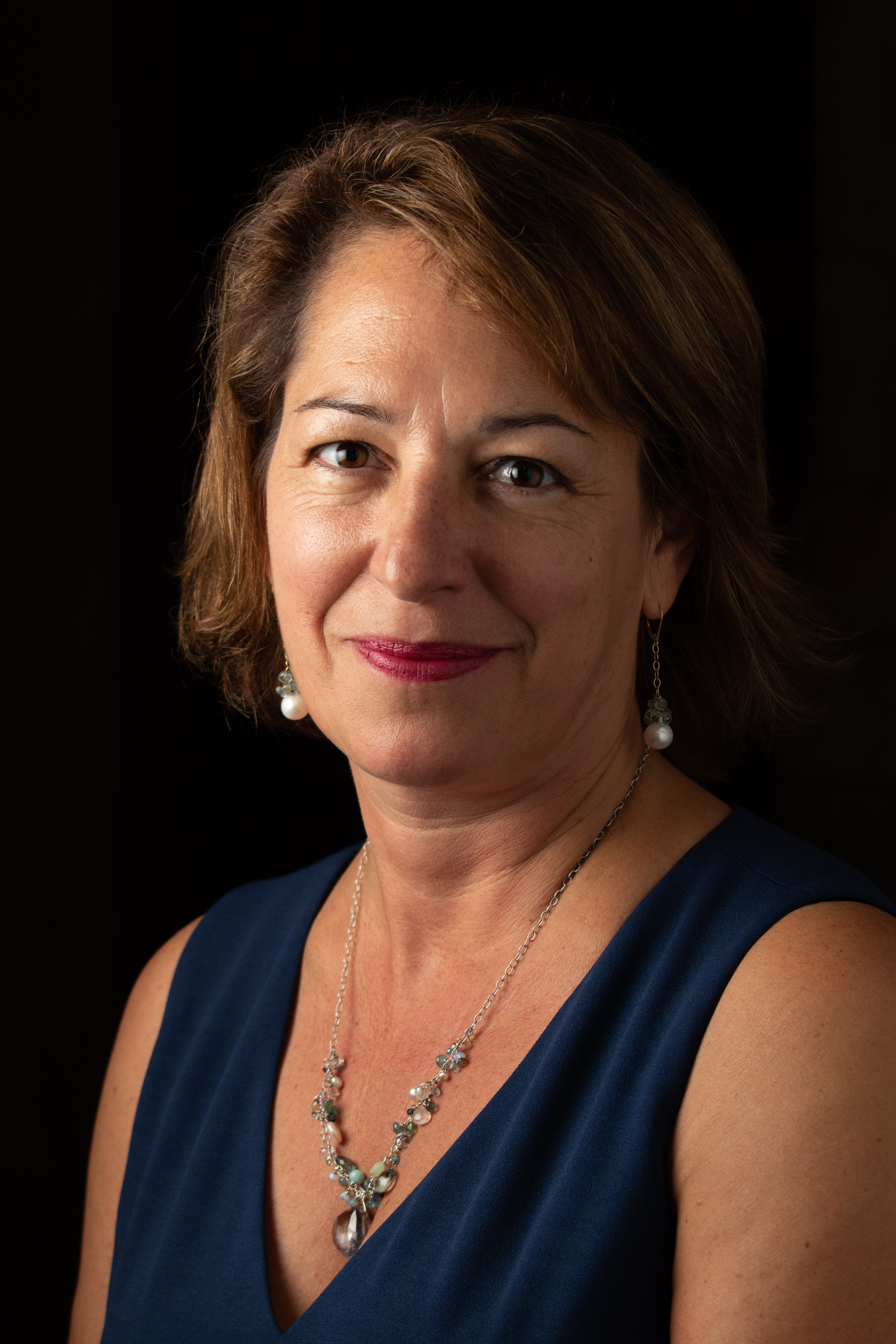
- Leonnig at the 2018 Pulitzer Prizes
- Born: Carol Duhurst Leonnig c. 1966
- Education: Bryn Mawr College
- Occupation: Journalist
- Notable credit(s): The Washington Post, The Charlotte Observer, The Philadelphia Inquirer
- Spouse: John Reeder
- Awards: 2015, 2018 Pulitzer Prize for National Reporting; 2014 Pulitzer Prize for Public Service; 2014 George Polk Award for investigative reporting

Carol Duhurst Leonnig is an American investigative journalist. She was a staff writer at The Washington Post from 2000 to 2025 and was part of a team of national security reporters that won the 2014 Pulitzer Prize for Public Service for reporting that revealed the NSA's expanded spying on Americans. Leonnig also received Pulitzer Prizes for National Reporting in 2015 and 2018.

== Early life ==
Leonnig is a native of Upper Marlboro in Prince George's County, Maryland. She graduated from Queen Anne School, a former college preparatory school, in Leeland, Maryland, in 1983. She graduated from Bryn Mawr College in 1987.

== Career ==
Her first reporting job was in 1989 at The Philadelphia Inquirer. She later became a staff writer for The Charlotte Observer, where she first reported on city government, later covering the state legislature and eventually became the paper's Washington correspondent. During her time at The Observer, she was a lead reporter on several investigative projects, including one involving Bank of America's use of federal funds to raze low-income housing near its corporate headquarters and another uncovering that Gov. Jim Hunt personally directed state funds to be used to build a major bridge in his rural hometown. Hunt apologized and canceled the project after the story about his involvement was published.

=== The Washington Post ===
At The Washington Post, Leonnig first covered the District of Columbia city government and its problems with corruption, and then spent five years covering the federal courts in Washington. She reported on the Bush administration and issues surrounding the indefinitely imprisoned detainees at the Guantanamo Bay detention camp. Leonnig wrote for the Post's National Desk as part of a team that investigated public officials, federal agencies, and government accountability.

She has done numerous radio and television interviews, including NPR, The NewsHour with Jim Lehrer, Fox News, and MSNBC. Her coverage of the Bush administration has been cited in books on the subject.

In 2011, Leonnig and her Post colleague Joe Stephens revealed in a series of stories how the Obama administration pressed to approve a $535 million federal loan to Solyndra, a solar panel manufacturer whose leading investors were tied to a major Obama fundraiser. Their stories documented how White House aides for the senior-most White House advisers pressured Office of Management and Budget officials to make a decision on approving the Solyndra loan in time for a press conference they had tentatively scheduled for the Vice President to announce the funding. The company was one President Obama himself touted in a visit in 2010, shortly after independent auditors raised concerns about Solyndra's financial stability.

=== MSNBC and MS NOW ===
In August 2025, Leonnig left the newspaper to become senior investigative correspondent for MSNBC and continues for MS NOW.

== Works ==
- A Very Stable Genius: Donald J. Trump's Testing of America (2020) Penguin Random House; ISBN 978-1-9848-7749-9; written with Philip Rucker
- Zero Fail: The Rise and Fall of the Secret Service (2021), Random House; ISBN 978-0-3995-8903-4
- I Alone Can Fix It: Donald J. Trump's Catastrophic Final Year (2021) Penguin Random House; ISBN 978-0-5932-9894-7; written with Philip Rucker
- Injustice: How Politics and Fear Vanquished America's Justice Department (2025) Penguin Random House; ISBN 978-0-5938-3137-3; written with Aaron C. Davis

== Awards ==
In 2018, Leonnig was part of the team that won the Pulitzer Prize for national reporting as a contributor to 10 stories on the investigation of Russian interference in the 2016 election with The Washington Post.

In 2015, Leonnig won the Pulitzer Prize for national reporting "for her smart, persistent coverage of the Secret Service, its security lapses and the ways in which the agency neglected its vital task: the protection of the President of the United States."

The Washington Post received the 2014 Pulitzer Prize for Public Service for its coverage of the National Security Agency's expanded surveillance of everyday Americans based on former NSA contractor Edward Snowden's disclosures. Leonnig was part of the reporting team whose six months of revelatory work exposed the government's secret collection of records for all Americans' phone calls and electronic communications. The team also uncovered how a secret court had authorized much of the communication collection under secret law. Despite President Obama's claims that the court provided a key check on the NSA's spying power, The Post team revealed how the court's top judges had belatedly learned that the NSA had been violating the court's rules to protect innocent individuals' privacy for years—in fact, from the day the surveillance programs began. The court's chief judge later acknowledged to the Post it had no way to check the NSA's claims that it was properly safeguarding privacy.

Also in 2014, Leonnig was a winner of the George Polk Award for investigative reporting, given by Long Island University, for her 2013 work uncovering a bribery scandal involving Virginia Gov. Bob McDonnell.

In 2005, Leonnig was part of a seven-person team that won the Selden Ring Award for Investigative Reporting given by the Annenberg School for Communication at the University of Southern California for a series of articles that uncovered unhealthy levels of lead in the drinking water in Washington, D.C., and problems with reporting water quality across the U.S.

She is also a former Paul Miller Washington Reporting Fellow.
