= Dan Gabriel =

American screenwriter

- Education: George Washington University
- Occupation: Filmmaker

Dan Gabriel is a documentary filmmaker and former Central Intelligence Agency officer. He is known for his work as director and executive producer of the 2019 film Mosul, and the 2015 television series Exiting Hell.

== Early education and career ==
Gabriel received a bachelor's degree in journalism and a graduate degree in international affairs from George Washington University. After graduation, he worked as a staff operations officer in the CIA's Directorate of Operations, where he worked in the fields of counter-terrorism and counter-radicalization. During this time he worked overseas during both Operation Iraqi Freedom and Operation Enduring Freedom.

== Film career ==
In 2013 Gabriel attended New York University’s Tisch School of the Arts, and spent 2014 studying at the University of California’s School of Theatre, Film and Television. Between 2015 and 2017, Gabriel was the creator and executive producer for the documentary television series Life After Daesh, airing on Alhurra. During the episodes of the series, former members of ISIS were interviewed about their experiences leaving the organization. In 2019 he released his documentary film Mosul, which he wrote, produced, and directed, which he began developing in 2016 during the attempts to liberate the city of Mosul from ISIS occupation. In addition to his work as a documentary filmmaker, he has also worked as a commentator on Fox News.
