= Green Bay Sweep =

Green Bay Sweep may refer to:

- Green Bay Sweep (politics), a plot to overturn the results of the 2020 United States presidential election
- Packers sweep, an American football play made famous by the Green Bay Packers
