= Attempts to overturn the 2020 United States presidential election =

- Part of the first presidency of Donald Trump, transition of Joe Biden, democratic backsliding in the United States
- The electoral map for the 2020 election. Blue denotes the 306 electoral votes for Biden, while red denotes the 232 electoral votes for Trump.
- Date: Main phase: November 4, 2020 – January 7, 2021 (2 months and 3 days); Later developments: January 7, 2021 – November 26, 2025 (4 years, 10 months, 2 weeks and 5 days)
- Location: Nationwide, especially in Pennsylvania, Georgia, Michigan, Wisconsin, Arizona, Nevada, New Mexico, and Washington, D.C.
- Caused by: Fabricated claims of electoral fraud by Donald Trump
- Goals: To overturn the results of the 2020 United States presidential election and install Donald Trump as president.
- Methods: Big lie; Legal challenges; Conspiracy (according to federal indictment); Racketeering (according to Georgia indictment)
- Result: Failure to overturn election, Joe Biden inaugurated; January 6 United States Capitol attack; Second impeachment of Donald Trump; Republican efforts to restrict voting; Third indictment of Donald Trump; Fourth indictment of Donald Trump

Casualties
- Charged: Donald Trump, Mark Meadows, Rudy Giuliani, Jenna Ellis, Sidney Powell, January 6 rioters

After Democratic nominee Joe Biden won the 2020 United States presidential election, Republican nominee and then-incumbent president Donald Trump pursued an unprecedented effort to overturn the election, (Note: Attributed to multiple references:) with support from his campaign, proxies, political allies, and many of his supporters. These efforts culminated in the January 6 Capitol attack, described by multiple sources as a self-coup d'état attempt. Trump and his allies used the "big lie" propaganda technique to promote false claims and conspiracy theories asserting that the election was stolen by means of rigged voting machines, electoral fraud and an international conspiracy. (Note: Attributed to multiple references:) Trump pressed Department of Justice leaders to challenge the results and publicly state the election was corrupt. The attorney general, director of national intelligence, director of the cybersecurity and infrastructure security agency, state and federal judges, election officials, and state governors dismissed these claims at the time.

Trump loyalists attempted to keep him in power; at the state level, they targeted legislatures with the intent of changing the results or delaying electoral vote certification at the Capitol; nationally, they promoted the idea Vice President Mike Pence could refuse to certify the results on January 6, 2021. Pence repeatedly stated the Vice President has no such authority and verified Biden and Harris as the winners. Hundreds of other elected Republicans refused to acknowledge Biden's victory, though a growing number acknowledged it over time. Trump's legal team sought to bring a case before the Supreme Court, but none of the 63 lawsuits they filed were successful. They pinned their hopes on Texas v. Pennsylvania, but on December 11, 2020, the Supreme Court declined to hear the case. Afterward, Trump considered ways to remain in power, including military intervention, seizing voting machines, and another appeal to the Supreme Court.

In June 2022, the House Select Committee on the January 6 Attack said it had enough evidence to recommend that the Department of Justice indict Trump, and on December 19, the committee formally made the criminal referral to the Justice Department. On August 1, 2023, Trump was indicted by a D.C. grand jury for conspiracy to defraud the United States, obstructing an official proceeding, conspiracy to obstruct an official proceeding, and conspiracy against rights; he pleaded not guilty to all charges. The Office of the Special Counsel believed there was enough evidence to convict Trump. However, given existing policy against prosecuting sitting presidents, the charges were dismissed following Trump's November 2024 election. On August 14, 2023, Trump and 18 co-defendants were indicted in Fulton County, Georgia, for their efforts to overturn the election results in that state. Four pleaded guilty. As of October 2025, the others (including Trump) have not yet been tried. The investigation into those who attacked the U.S. Capitol building was the largest criminal probe in U.S. history. Over 1,500 people were charged with federal crimes; 10 Proud Boys and Oath Keepers leaders were convicted of seditious conspiracy. However, Trump pardoned them en masse on his first day back in office in 2025.

Trump continues to falsely insist the election was stolen, telling a group of historians in mid-2021 that the election was "rigged and lost", stating in 2022 that he should be declared president or a new election held "immediately". In 2022, Trump supporters continued their attempts to overturn the election, pushing for state legislature resolutions and new lawsuits. Legal experts said public confidence in democracy was being undermined to lay the groundwork for baselessly challenging future elections. Trump continued to make these false claims during his second presidency in 2025.

== Background ==
=== Trump's 2012 accusations of electoral fraud ===
In the aftermath of the 2012 presidential election, in which incumbent president Barack Obama won re-election against Mitt Romney, Donald Trump tweeted that "The electoral college is a disaster for a democracy", that the election was a "total sham", and that the United States was "not a democracy".

=== Uncertainty over Trump accepting an electoral loss in 2016 ===
Trump at a campaign rally on October 20, 2016, stating, "I will totally accept the results of this great and historic presidential election, if I win"

Trump repeatedly suggested that the election was "rigged" against him, and in the final debate he cast doubt on whether he would accept the results of the election should he lose, saying "I'll keep you in suspense". His comment touched off a media and political uproar, in which he was accused of "threatening to upend a fundamental pillar of American democracy" and "rais(ing) the prospect that millions of his supporters may not accept the results on Nov. 8 if he loses". Rick Hasen of University of California, Irvine School of Law, an election-law expert, described Trump's comments as "appalling and unprecedented" and feared there could be "violence in the streets from his supporters if Trump loses". The next day Trump said, "Of course, I would accept a clear election result, but I would also reserve my right to contest or file a legal challenge in the case of a questionable result." He also stated that he would "totally" accept the election results "if I win".

The controversies surrounding the election prompted calls to improve federal election laws. The Democratic led House of Representatives passed the For the People Act on March 3, 2019, but it was blocked from being heard in the Republican-led Senate by Senate Majority Leader Mitch McConnell.

=== Uncertainty over Trump accepting an electoral loss in 2020 ===
During the 2020 campaign, Trump indicated in Twitter posts, interviews and speeches that he might refuse to recognize the outcome of the election if he were defeated and suggested that the election would be rigged against him. In July 2020, Trump declined to state whether he would accept the results, telling Fox News anchor Chris Wallace that "I have to see. No, I'm not going to just say yes. I'm not going to say no." Trump also proposed delaying the presidential election due to COVID-19, until Americans could vote "properly, securely and safely". (Note: This would require a law passed by Congress to delay the vote and a constitutional amendment to change the term of office. Congress had no interest in taking either action at the time.)

Trump repeatedly claimed that if he lost the election, it was "rigged" against him and repeatedly refused to commit to a peaceful transition of power after the election. Trump also criticized mail-in voting throughout the campaign, falsely claiming that the practice contained high rates of fraud. At one point, Trump said: "We'll see what happens...Get rid of the ballots and you'll have a very peaceful – there won't be a transfer, frankly. There will be a continuation." Trump's statements have been described as a threat "to upend the constitutional order". In September 2020, Federal Bureau of Investigation (FBI) Director Christopher A. Wray, a Trump appointee, testified under oath that the FBI has "not seen, historically, any kind of coordinated national voter fraud effort in a major election, whether it's by mail or otherwise".

A number of congressional Republicans insisted that they were committed to an orderly and peaceful transition of power, but declined to criticize Trump for his comments. On September 24, the Senate unanimously passed a resolution affirming the Senate's commitment to a peaceful transfer of power. However, on October 8 Republican senator Mike Lee tweeted "We're not a democracy" and "Democracy isn't the objective; liberty, peace, and prospefity [sic] are. We want the human condition to flourish. Rank democracy can thwart that." Trump also stated that he expected the U.S. Supreme Court to decide the election and that he wanted a conservative majority in the event of an election dispute, reiterating his commitment to quickly install a ninth justice following the death of Ruth Bader Ginsburg.

== Refusal to accept 2020 electoral loss ==
=== Refusal to accept 2020 electoral loss by Donald Trump ===
==== Before results declared ====
CNN fact checker Daniel Dale reported that through June 9, 2021, Trump had issued 132 written statements since leaving office, of which "a third have included lies about the election", more than any other subject.

To sow election doubt, Trump escalated use of "rigged election" and "election interference" statements in advance of the 2024 election compared to the previous two elections—the statements described as part of a "heads I win; tails you cheated" rhetorical strategy.

At 2 am on Wednesday, November 4, 2020, with the election results still unclear, Trump held a press conference at the White House in which he stated: "This is a fraud on the American public. This is an embarrassment to our country. We were getting ready to win this election. Frankly, we did win this election." The statement was condemned almost immediately. The statement was also described as having been months in the making. At 9 am on Thursday, November 5, 2020, Trump tweeted "STOP THE COUNT!" However, at that time Biden was already leading in enough states such that stopping the count would have resulted in a Biden victory. After all major news organizations declared Biden the President-elect on November 7, Trump refused to accept his loss, declaring "this election is far from over" and alleging election fraud without providing evidence. Privately, according to reporting by Maggie Haberman, he told one aide "I'm just not going to leave", and he told another aide, "We're never leaving. How can you leave when you won an election?"

==== After results declared ====
In the months between the election and Inauguration Day (January 20), Trump engaged in multiple efforts to overturn the results. He filed numerous lawsuits, urged local and state authorities to overturn the results in their jurisdiction, pressed the Justice Department to verify unsupported claims of election fraud, and worked with congressional allies to overturn the results in Congress on January 6.

He indicated that he would continue legal challenges in key states, but all were dismissed by the courts. His legal team, led by Rudy Giuliani, made numerous false and unsubstantiated assertions revolving around an international communist conspiracy, rigged voting machines, and polling place fraud to claim that the election had been stolen from Trump. (Note: For this, a New York court eventually suspended Giuliani's law license.) Trump blocked government officials from cooperating in the presidential transition to Joe Biden. Attorney General William Barr authorized the Justice Department to initiate investigations "if there are clear and apparently credible allegations of irregularities that, if true, could potentially impact the outcome of a federal election in an individual state".

Trump and his allies encouraged state officials to throw out ballots they thought were not legally cast, challenge vote-certification processes, and overturn certified election results. In an early January 2021 phone call, he pressed the Georgia secretary of state to "find" the 11,780 votes needed to secure his victory in the state. He repeatedly urged Georgia Governor Brian Kemp to convene a special session of the legislature to overturn Biden's certified victory in the state, and he made a similar plea to the Pennsylvania Speaker of the House. On a conference call, he asked 300 Republican state legislators to seek ways to reverse certified election results in their states. Republican officials in seven states, directed by Trump's personal attorney, created fraudulent electoral certificates of ascertainment to falsely assert Trump had been reelected.

By December 30, 2020, multiple Republican members of the House and Senate indicated they would try to force both chambers to debate whether to certify the Electoral College results. Mike Pence, who as vice president would preside over the proceedings, signaled his endorsement of the effort, stating on January 4, "I promise you, come this Wednesday, we will have our day in Congress". Additionally, Trump and some supporters promoted a false "Pence card" theory that, even if Congress were to certify the results, the vice president had the authority to reject them.

==== After leaving office ====
Since leaving office, Trump has continued to insist that he won the 2020 election. He reportedly dislikes the term "former president", and his official statements refer to him as "the 45th President" or simply as "45", as on his new website, www.45office.com. During his public speeches, he insists that massive election fraud caused his loss, saying, "This was the scam of the century and this was the crime of the century" and "We won the election twice [2016 and 2020] and it's possible we'll have to win it a third time [2024]."

In a September 2023 interview with Kristen Welker for NBC's Meet the Press, Trump said, regarding the attorneys who told him he lost the election, that he "didn't respect them as lawyers" but "did respect others" who told him he won. He said that, ultimately, his effort to overturn the election results "was my decision". He maintained: "I say I won the election."

=== Refusal to accept 2020 electoral loss by Trump's allies and supporters ===
==== Stop the Steal ====
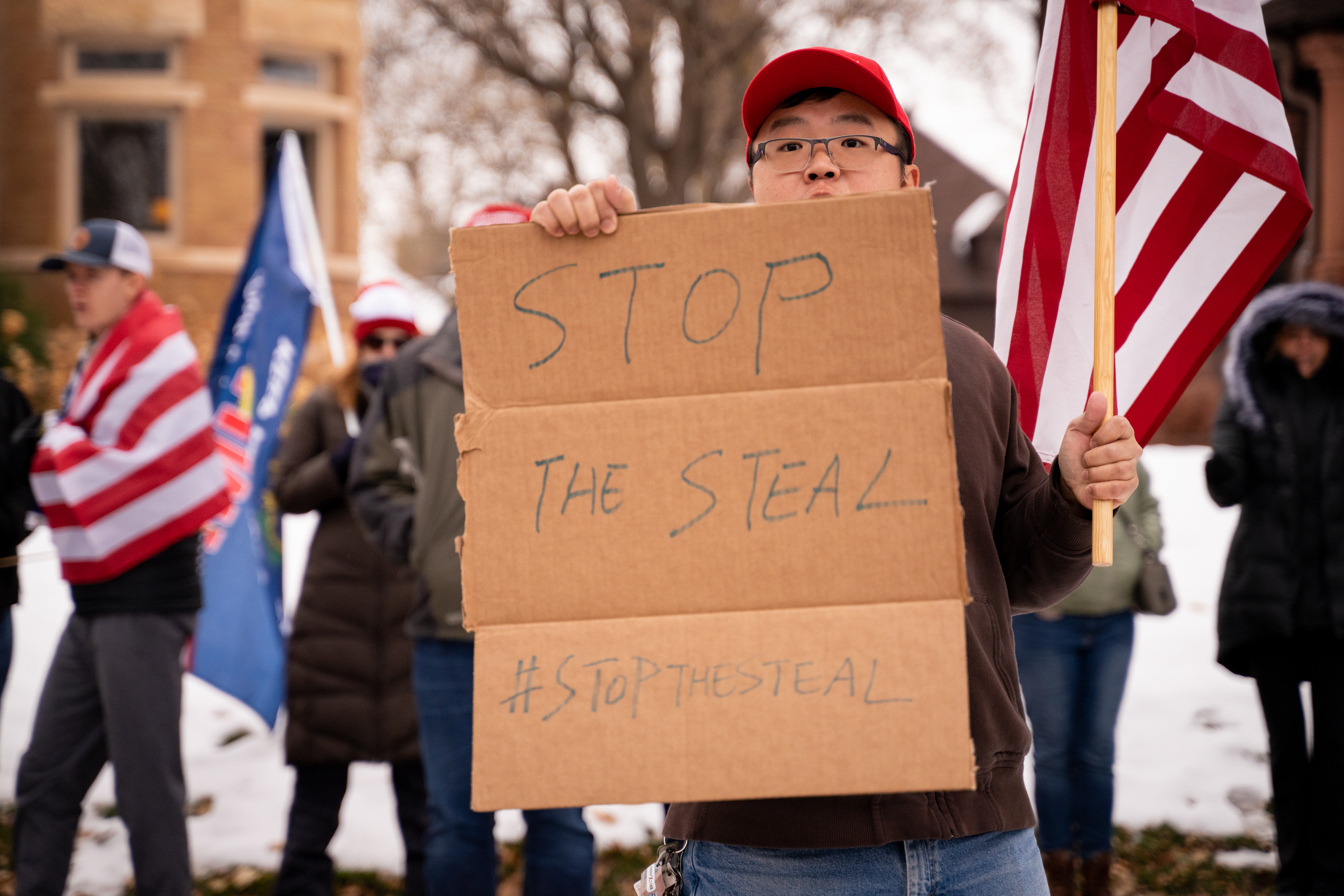
A protestor holding a "Stop the Steal" sign in St. Paul, Minnesota, on November 14, 2020

Stop the Steal is a far-right campaign and protest movement in the United States promoting the conspiracy theory that widespread electoral fraud occurred during the 2020 presidential election. Trump and his supporters have asserted, without evidence, that he is the winner of the election, and that large-scale voter and vote counting fraud took place in several swing states. The Associated Press, ABC News, CBS News, CNN, Decision Desk HQ, NBC News, The New York Times, and Fox News projected Biden as the president-elect, having surpassed the 270 Electoral College votes needed to claim victory. A New York Times survey of state election officials found no evidence of significant voting fraud, nor did the Justice Department, and dozens of lawsuits filed by Trump and his proxies to challenge voting results in several states failed.

"Stop the Steal" was created by Republican political operative Roger Stone in 2016, in anticipation of potential future election losses that could be portrayed as stolen by alleged fraud. A Facebook group with that name was created during the 2020 counting of votes by pro-Trump group "Women for America First" co-founder and Tea Party movement activist Amy Kremer. Facebook removed the group on November 5, describing it as "organized around the delegitimization of the election process". It was reported to have been adding 1,000 new members every 10 seconds with 360,000 followers before Facebook shut it down. Some "Stop the Steal" Facebook groups had discussed extreme violence, incitement to violence, and other threats. CounterAction, a social media analytics firm, provided ProPublica and the Washington Post an audit of Facebook groups and posts which identified 650,000 election delegitimization posts leading up to January 6. On January 11, 2021, Facebook announced that it would remove content containing the phrase "stop the steal" from Facebook and Instagram.

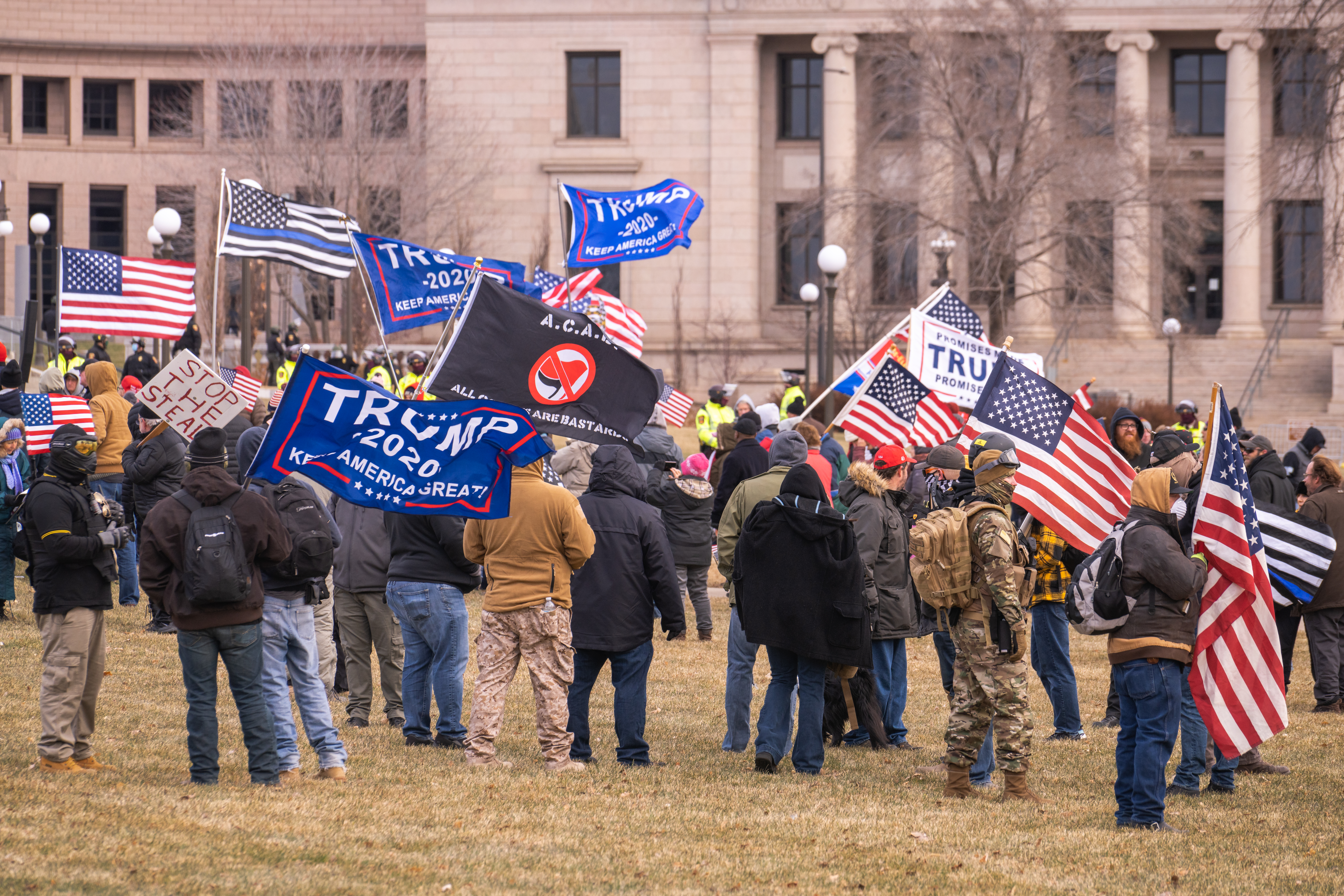
Stop the Steal protesters gathered outside the Minnesota State Capitol on December 12, 2020. A Boogaloo movement member was charged in connection to the event.

Several "Stop the Steal" groups were founded by right-wing groups after Trump published tweets on Twitter encouraging his supporters to "Stop the Count". Many unorganized "Stop the Steal" groups protested in various U.S. cities, including Washington, D.C.; Detroit, Michigan; Lansing, Michigan; Las Vegas, Nevada; Madison, Wisconsin; Atlanta, Georgia; and Columbus, Ohio. Several of these protests included members of extremist groups such as the Three Percenters, the Proud Boys and the Oath Keepers, which CNN reported was an illustration of "the thinning of a line between the mainstream right and far-right extremists".

In Michigan on December 7, 2020, "Stop the Steal" protestors gathered outside the private home of Michigan's Secretary of State Jocelyn Benson to shout obscenities and chant threatening speech into bullhorns. Biden's Michigan win by 154,000 votes had been officially certified by the Michigan Board of State Canvassers in November.

On December 12, 2020, post-election protests were held in Washington, D.C. At least nine people were transported from the protest by D.C. Fire and emergency medical service workers for hospital treatment. Among the injured were four people who suffered stab wounds and were said to be in critical condition. Two police officers suffered non-life-threatening injuries, and two others suffered minor injuries. An additional 33 people were arrested, including one for assault with a dangerous weapon. Earlier in the day, large groups of protesters and counter-protestors assembled outside the Supreme Court and Freedom Plaza.

By March 2021, organizations linked to the Stop the Steal movement, including the Proud Boys and the boogaloo movement, had largely shifted their efforts to spreading misinformation about COVID-19 vaccines as a way of undermining government credibility.

On April 7, 2021, the U.S. District Court of Minnesota charged self-proclaimed boogaloo bois member Michael Paul Dahlager with illegal possession of a machine gun. Dahlager had traveled to the Minnesota State Capitol in Saint Paul for a December 12, 2020, "Stop the Steal" rally where he scouted law enforcement positions and numbers. Dahlager had discussed with confidential informants his willingness to kill law enforcement members and incite violent uprisings against the government. Dahlager had allegedly planned to carry out an attack in early 2021 on the state's capitol building, but abandoned it after he believed that informants were among his inner circle. Dahlager pleaded guilty to federal weapons charges in July 2021.

In the days after the election, Ginni Thomas, wife of Supreme Court justice Clarence Thomas, exchanged 29 text messages with Trump chief of staff Mark Meadows, urging him to pursue efforts to overturn the election. Thomas asserted "The majority knows Biden and the Left is attempting the greatest Heist of our History" and recited a message circulating in right-wing media that the "Biden crime family & ballot fraud co-conspirators" were being arrested "to face military tribunals for sedition" at Guantanamo Bay detention camp. Thomas wrote, "Do not concede. It takes time for the army who is gathering for his back." In March 2022, Thomas acknowledged she had attended the January 6 Stop the Steal rally but there was no evidence she had been involved in its organization.

==== Trump's letter to Biden ====
On November 10, 2026, Biden revealed that Trump personally hailed him as someone he trusted "will be true to yourself and the American people," even while contesting his loss in the 2020 election and publicly decried the outcome having been stolen from him by Democratic forces.

== November 2020 ==
On at least one occasion in November 2020, Trump privately acknowledged that he lost the election. Alyssa Farah Griffin, a White House aide to Trump, recalls him exclaiming "Can you believe I lost to this guy?" while watching Biden on television. This, however, was not Trump's public position.

The Cybersecurity and Infrastructure Security Agency had a website called Rumor Control to combat disinformation, and on November 12, CISA Director Chris Krebs called the election "the most secure in American history". Trump fired Krebs, and Trump attorney Joseph diGenova called for his execution. (Years later, on April 9, 2025, Trump directed Attorney General Pam Bondi and Homeland Security Secretary Kristi Noem to investigate Krebs and revoke his security clearance.)

Emily Murphy, the administrator of the General Services Administration, delayed the start of the presidential transition until sixteen days after most media outlets had projected Biden to be the winner.

=== "Fake" electors ===
On November 3, Gregory Jacob wrote to Marc Short that it would be undesirable for the public to perceive Vice President Pence as if he had prejudged "questions concerning disputed electoral votes".

On November 4, White House Chief of Staff Mark Meadows received a text message calling for an "aggressive strategy" of having the Republican-led legislatures of three uncalled states "just send their own electors to vote and have it go to the [Supreme Court]". This was reportedly sent by Trump's secretary of energy, Rick Perry.

On November 5, Donald Trump Jr. sent a text message to Meadows outlining paths to subvert the Electoral College process and ensure his father a second term. Excerpts from the message are:

It's very simple. We have multiple paths. We control them all. We have operational control. Total leverage. Moral high ground. POTUS must start second term now. Republicans control 28 states Democrats 22 states. Once again Trump wins. We either have a vote WE control and WE win OR it gets kicked to Congress 6 January 2021.

Biden had not yet been declared the winner at the time of the text. Trump Jr. testified to the House select committee on May 3, 2022, that he had not written the message and did not recall who had, but that the idea had "sounded plausible" and was "the most sophisticated" plan he'd heard, although it concerned "things I don't necessarily, you know, know too much about".

On November 9, Ginni Thomas, wife of Supreme Court Justice Clarence Thomas, emailed 29 Arizona lawmakers, including Russell Bowers and Shawnna Bolick, encouraging them to pick "a clean slate of Electors" and telling them that the responsibility was "yours and yours alone".

On November 18, James R. Troupis, a lawyer for the Trump campaign in Wisconsin, received a memo from Boston attorney Kenneth Chesebro outlining a plan to create and submit alternate slates of electors in contested states.

Another memo three weeks later went to Wisconsin and several other contested states. The memos are evidence that within weeks of the election, the Trump campaign was focusing on January 6, 2021, as the "hard deadline" for determining the outcome of the election.

The White House Counsel's Office reportedly reviewed the plans to use alternate electors and deemed them not to be legally sound.

=== Lame duck firings and hirings ===
After vote counts showed a Biden victory, Trump engaged in what has been called a "post-election purge", firing or forcing out at least a dozen officials and replacing them with loyalists. Secretary of Defense Mark Esper was fired by tweet on November 9. Undersecretary for Defense Joseph D. Kernan and Acting Undersecretary for Policy James H. Anderson resigned in protest or were forced out. The White House sought to learn the names of political appointees who had applauded Anderson upon his departure, so they could be fired. The DOD chief of staff, Jen Stewart, was replaced by a former staffer to Representative Devin Nunes. On November 30, Christopher P. Maier, the head of the Pentagon's Defeat ISIS Task Force, was ousted and the task force was disbanded; a White House official told him that the United States had won the war against the Islamic State, so the task force was no longer needed.

Trump's allegations of election fraud in battleground states were refuted by judges, state election officials, and his own administration's Cybersecurity and Infrastructure Security Agency (CISA). After CISA director Chris Krebs contradicted Trump's voting-fraud allegations, Trump fired him on November 17. Three other Department of Homeland Security officials – CISA's deputy director Matthew Travis, CISA's assistant director for cybersecurity, Bryan Ware, and the DHS's assistant secretary of international affairs Valerie Boyd – were also forced out.

Bonnie Glick, the deputy administrator of the United States Agency for International Development, was abruptly fired on November 6; she had prepared a transition manual for the next administration. She was due to become acting administrator of the department on November 7. Firing her left the position of acting administrator vacant, so that Trump loyalist John Barsa could become acting deputy administrator.

Career climate scientist Michael Kuperberg, who for the past five years has produced the annual National Climate Assessment issued by National Oceanic and Atmospheric Administration (NOAA), was demoted on November 9 and returned to his previous position at the Department of Energy. Several media outlets reported that David Legates, a deputy assistant secretary at NOAA who claims that global warming is harmless, would be appointed to oversee the congressionally mandated report in place of Kuperberg, based on information obtained from "people close to the Administration", including Myron Ebell, the head of President Trump's Environmental Protection Agency transition team and director of the Center for Energy and Environment at the Competitive Enterprise Institute. As of May 18, 2021, the Biden administration reappointed Kuperberg as executive director of the U.S. Global Change Research Program.

On November 5, Neil Chatterjee was removed from his post as chair of the Federal Energy Regulatory Commission.

On November 11, Lisa Gordon-Hagerty resigned from her posts as Under Secretary of Energy for Nuclear Security and administrator of the quasi-independent National Nuclear Security Administration, reportedly due to longstanding tensions and disagreements with Secretary of Energy Dan Brouillette.

In October 2020, Trump signed an executive order that created a new category of federal employee, Schedule F, which included all career civil servants whose job includes "policymaking". Such employees would no longer be covered by civil service protections against arbitrary dismissal, but would be subject to the same rules as political appointees. The new description could be applied to thousands of nonpartisan experts, such as scientists who give advice to the political appointees who run their departments. Heads of all federal agencies were ordered to report by January 19, 2021, a list of positions that could be reclassified as Schedule F. The Office of Management and Budget submitted a list in November that included 88 percent of the office's workforce. Federal employee organizations and Congressional Democrats sought to overturn the order via lawsuits or bills. House Democrats warned in a letter that "The executive order could precipitate a mass exodus from the federal government at the end of every presidential administration, leaving federal agencies without deep institutional knowledge, expertise, experience, and the ability to develop and implement long-term policy strategies". Observers predicted that Trump could use the new rule to implement a "massive government purge on his way out the door".

Meanwhile, administration officials had ordered the Budget Office to begin work on a 2022 budget proposal that they would submit to Congress in February, ignoring the fact that Biden would have already taken over by that point.

=== Lawsuits ===
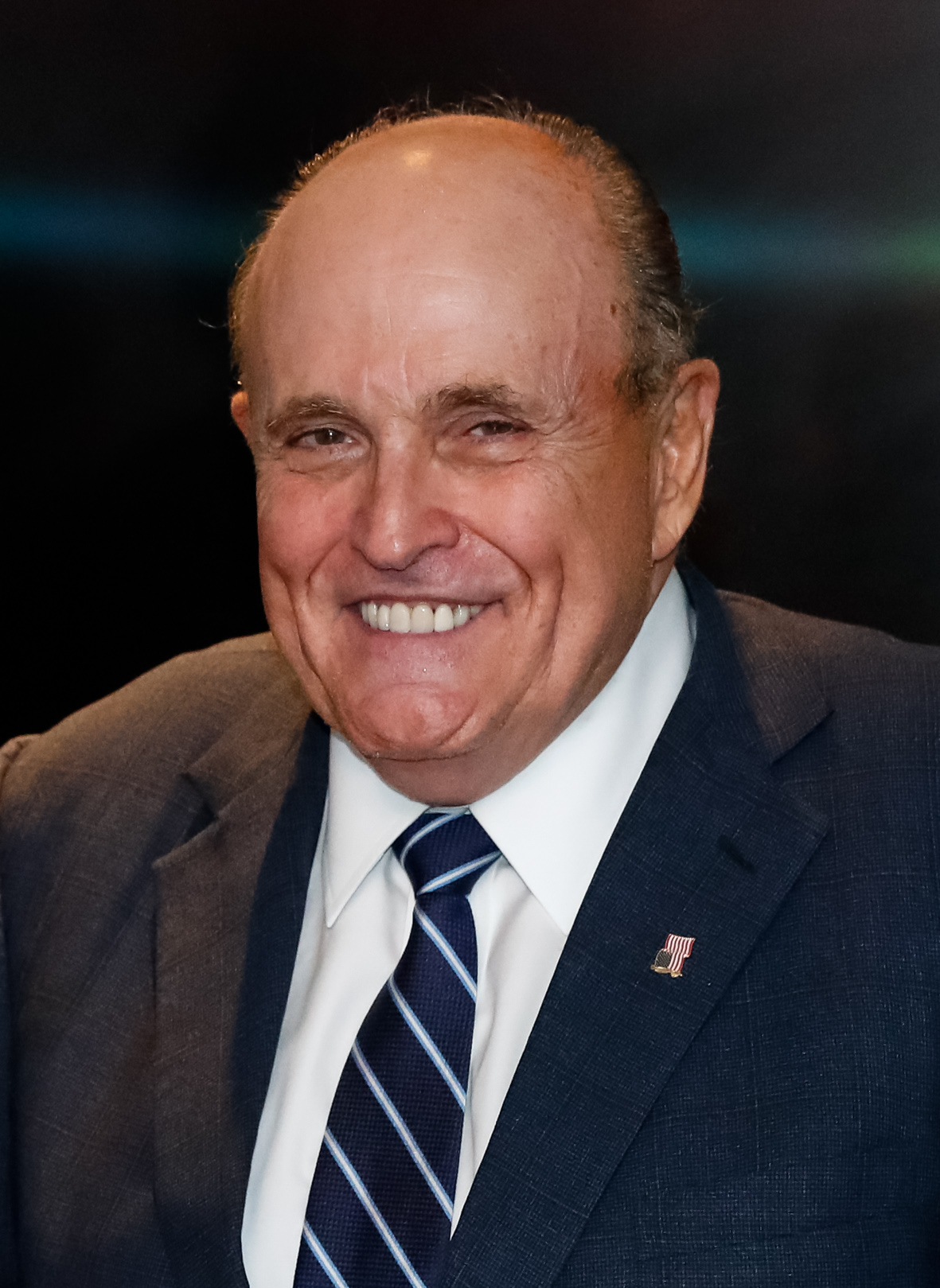
Rudy Giuliani, head of Trump's failed legal efforts, falsely asserted that the election had been subject to massive fraud.

After the 2020 United States presidential election, the campaign for incumbent president Donald Trump filed a number of lawsuits contesting election processes, vote-counting, and the vote-certification process in multiple states, including Arizona, Georgia, Michigan, Nevada, Pennsylvania, Texas, and Wisconsin. Many such cases were quickly dismissed, and lawyers and other observers noted that the lawsuits were unlikely to have an effect on the outcome of the election. By November 19, more than two dozen of the legal challenges filed since Election Day had failed.

On November 21, U.S. District Court in Pennsylvania Judge Matthew Brann, a Republican, dismissed the case before him with prejudice, ruling:

In this action, the Trump Campaign and the Individual Plaintiffs ... seek to discard millions of votes legally cast by Pennsylvanians from all corners – from Greene County to Pike County, and everywhere in between. In other words, Plaintiffs ask this Court to disenfranchise almost seven million voters. This Court has been unable to find any case in which a plaintiff has sought such a drastic remedy in the contest of an election, in terms of the sheer volume of votes asked to be invalidated. One might expect that when seeking such a startling outcome, a plaintiff would come formidably armed with compelling legal arguments and factual proof of rampant corruption, such that this Court would have no option but to regrettably grant the proposed injunctive relief despite the impact it would have on such a large group of citizens.

That has not happened. Instead, this Court has been presented with strained legal arguments without merit and speculative accusations, unpled in the operative complaint and unsupported by evidence. In the United States of America, this cannot justify the disenfranchisement of a single voter, let alone all the voters of its sixth most populated state. Our people, laws, and institutions demand more.

=== Michigan officials pressured to not certify ===
Prior to November 17, the four-member board of canvassers of Wayne County, Michigan, was deadlocked on election-result certification along party lines with the two Republican members refusing to certify, but on November 17 the board voted unanimously to certify its results. Trump and Republican National Committee Chair Ronna McDaniel called the two Republican members of the board that day to pressure them to not sign the official statement of votes; the next day the two Republicans sought but failed to rescind their votes for certification, signing affidavits stating that they had voted for certification only because the two Democratic members had promised a full audit of the county's votes. The two denied Trump's call had influenced their reversal. A recording of the phone call surfaced in December 2023, on which McDaniel can be heard telling the two Republicans, "We will get you attorneys," to which Trump added, "We'll take care of that." Trump can also be heard to say, "We've got to fight for our country. We can't let these people take our country away from us."

Trump issued an invitation to Michigan lawmakers to travel to Washington. Michigan House Speaker Lee Chatfield, State Senate Majority Leader Mike Shirkey and State Representative Jim Lilly were photographed in the lobby of the D.C. Trump Tower, where they were drinking $500-a-bottle champagne and were not wearing masks. After the meeting, Chatfield and Shirkey released a joint statement indicating that they would "follow the law" and would not attempt to have the legislature intervene in selecting electoral votes. Chatfield later floated the possibility of a "constitutional crisis" in Michigan, while Shirkey suggested that certification be delayed; however, neither took any concrete action to invalidate Biden's victory. On November 21, Ronna McDaniel and Michigan Republican Party Chair Laura Cox publicly called upon the Michigan State Board of Canvassers to not proceed with the planned certification of election results. On November 23, the State Board of Canvassers certified the election.

=== Attempt to seize voting machines in Michigan ===
Starting in November 2020, the Trump campaign attempted to get local law enforcement agencies to seize voting machines for the Trump operation to review. In one Michigan county, Trump advisors including Rudy Giuliani phoned the county prosecutor on or about November 20, 2020. They asked him to obtain the county's voting machines and turn them over to the Trump team. He refused, but a judge later ordered the machines to be made available to Trump representatives. They later produced a "forensic report" claiming evidence of fraud; election experts have said the conclusion was false and the report "critically flawed".

At least one person was indicted for trying to illegally access voting machines after the election.

=== Georgia Secretary of State pressured to disqualify ballots ===
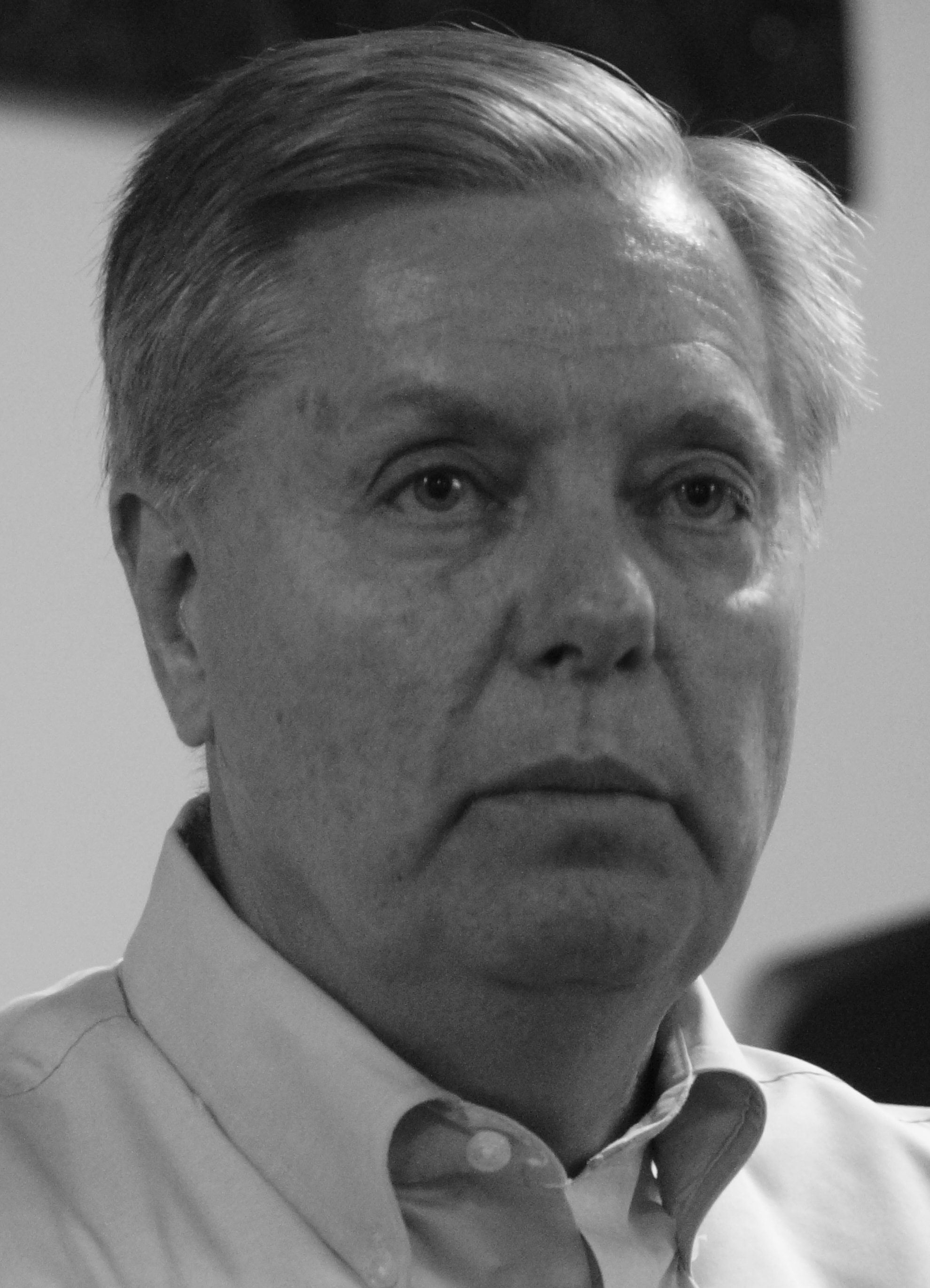
Sen. Lindsey Graham (R-SC) contacted the Georgia Secretary of State about invalidating ballots.

The 2020 United States presidential election in Georgia produced an initial count wherein Biden defeated Trump by around 14,000 votes, triggering an automatic recount due to the small margin. On November 13, 2020, while the recount was ongoing, Senator Lindsey Graham of South Carolina privately called Georgia Secretary of State Brad Raffensperger to discuss Georgia's vote counting. Raffensperger, a Republican, told The Washington Post that Graham had asked whether Raffensperger could disqualify all mail-in ballots in counties that had more signature errors. Gabriel Sterling, a Republican election official and staffer to Raffensperger, was present for the call, and Sterling confirmed that Graham had asked that question.

Raffensperger viewed Graham's question as a suggestion to throw out legally cast ballots, although Graham denied suggesting that. Graham acknowledged calling Raffensperger to find out how to "protect the integrity of mail-in voting" and "how does signature verification work?", but declared that if Raffensperger "feels threatened by that conversation, he's got a problem". Graham stated that he was investigating in his own capacity as a senator, although he is the head of the Senate Judiciary Committee. Graham also claimed that he had spoken to the Secretaries of State in Arizona and Nevada. The Secretaries, however, denied this, and Graham then contradicted himself, stating that he had talked to the Governor of Arizona but no official in Nevada.

=== Wisconsin recount-obstruction ===
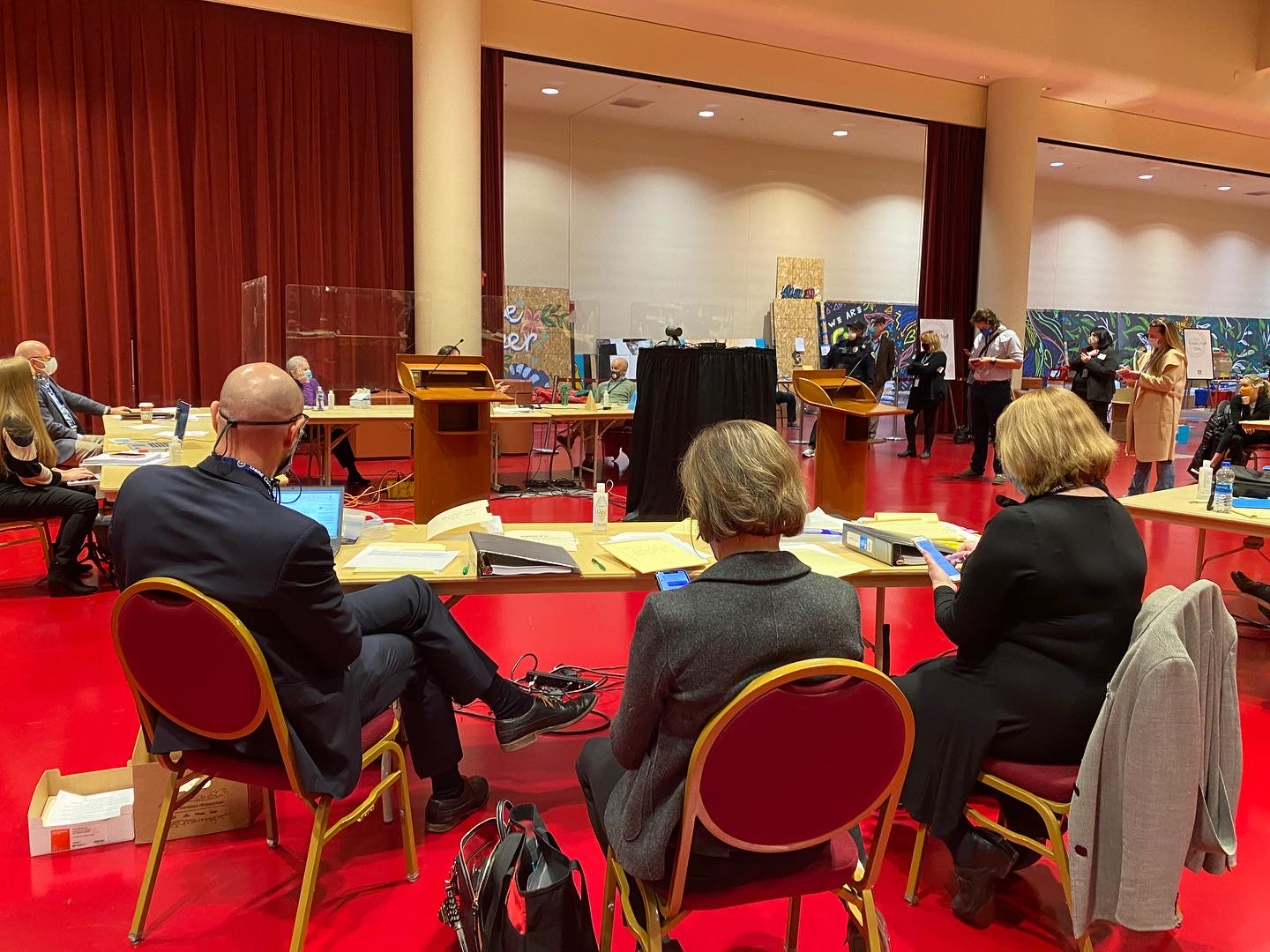
Dane County recount being conducted at Monona Terrace in Madison, Wisconsin

On November 5, 2020, Andrew Iverson, head of Trump's Wisconsin campaign, told other campaign operatives in a strategy session: "Here's the deal: Comms is going to continue to fan the flame and get the word out about Democrats trying to steal this election. We'll do whatever they need. Just be on standby if there's any stunts we need to pull." (Note: The audio was obtained by the Associated Press on February 2, 2023.)

The Trump campaign requested a recount in Milwaukee and Dane counties, both Democratic strongholds. On November 20, 2020, Wisconsin election officials reported that Trump campaign observers were attempting to obstruct the recount. According to officials, observers were "constantly interrupting vote-counters with questions and comments". At one table, a Republican representative was objecting to every ballot that was pulled for recount. At other tables, there were two Republican observers when only one was allowed; it was also reported that some Republicans had been posing as independents. Completed by November 29, the recounts ended up increasing Biden's lead by 87 votes.

=== Partisan hearings with Republican legislatures ===
On November 25, 2020, one day after Pennsylvania certified its election results, a Republican state senator requested a hearing of the State Senate Majority Policy Committee to discuss election issues. The event, described as an "informational meeting", was held at a hotel in Gettysburg and featured Rudy Giuliani asserting that the election had been subject to massive fraud. Trump also spoke to the group by speakerphone, repeating his false claim that he had actually won in Pennsylvania and other swing states, and saying "We have to turn the election over".

In Arizona, a state won by Biden, Republican members of the Arizona Senate promoted Trump's false claims of election fraud. In mid-December 2020, Eddie Farnsworth, Chairman of the State Senate Judiciary Committee, claimed that "tampering" or "fraud" might have marred the election, despite the testimony given by election officials, attorneys, and the Arizona Attorney General Election Integrity Unit at a six-hour hearing, all of whom testified that there was no evidence for such claims. Hearings held in the Michigan Legislature similarly presented no evidence of any fraud or other wrongdoing.

=== Conspiracy allegations ===
Days before the 2020 presidential election, Dennis Montgomery, a software designer with a history of making dubious claims, asserted that a program called Scorecard, running on a government supercomputer called Hammer, would be used to switch votes from Trump to Biden on voting machines. Trump legal team attorney Sidney Powell promoted the conspiracy theory on Lou Dobbs Tonight on November 6, and again two days later on Maria Bartiromo's Fox Business program, claiming to have "evidence that that is exactly what happened". She also asserted that the CIA ignored warnings about the software, and urged Trump to fire director Gina Haspel. Christopher Krebs, director of the Cybersecurity and Infrastructure Security Agency (CISA), characterized the supercomputer claim as "nonsense" and a "hoax". CISA described the 2020 election as "the most secure in American history", with "no evidence that any voting system deleted or lost votes, changed votes or was in any way compromised". A few days later, Trump fired Krebs by tweet, claiming that Krebs' analysis was "highly inaccurate".

On November 13, 2020, the Trump campaign's deputy director of communications, Zach Parkinson, asked his staff to review the claims regarding the voting machines; the staff concluded these claims were baseless.

During a November 19, 2020, press conference, Powell alleged without evidence that an international Communist plot had been engineered by Venezuela, Cuba, China, Hugo Chávez (who died in 2013), George Soros, the Clinton Foundation, and antifa to rig the 2020 elections. She also alleged that Dominion Voting Systems "can set and run an algorithm that probably ran all over the country to take a certain percentage of votes from President Trump and flip them to President Biden". The source for many of these claims appeared to be the far-right news organization One America News Network (OANN). She also repeated a conspiracy theory spread by Texan Congressman Louie Gohmert, OANN and others: that accurate voting results had been transmitted to the German office of the Spanish electronic voting firm Scytl, where they were tabulated to reveal a landslide victory for Trump nationwide (which included implausible Trump victories in Democratic strongholds such as California, Colorado, Maine statewide, Minnesota, and New Mexico), after which a company server was supposedly seized in a raid by the United States Army. The U.S. Army and Scytl refuted those claims: Scytl has not had any offices in Germany since September 2019, and it does not tabulate any U.S. votes. In a March 2021 report, the Justice and Homeland Security Departments flatly rejected accusations of voting fraud conducted by foreign nations. Rudy Giuliani also spoke at this press conference. In a private text message, Rupert Murdoch described the Powell–Giuliani presentation as "really crazy stuff, and damaging".

In a subsequent interview with Newsmax on November 21, 2020, Powell accused Georgia's Republican governor, Brian Kemp, of being "in on the Dominion scam" and suggested financial impropriety. Powell additionally alleged that fraud had prevented Doug Collins from winning a top-two position in the November 2020 nonpartisan blanket primary against incumbent Kelly Loeffler in the Senate race in Georgia. She also claimed that the Democratic Party had used rigged Dominion machines to defeat Bernie Sanders in the 2016 primary and that Sanders had learned of this but had "sold out". She stated that she would "blow up" Georgia with a "biblical" court filing. Powell suggested that candidates "paid to have the system rigged to work for them". On the basis of these claims, Powell called for Republican-controlled state legislatures in swing states to disregard the election results and appoint a slate of "loyal" electors who would vote to re-elect Trump, based on authority supposedly resting in Article Two of the Constitution. The Washington Post reported that on December 5 Trump asked Kemp to convene a special session of the Georgia legislature for that purpose, but Kemp declined. Trump also pressured Pennsylvania Speaker of the House Bryan Cutler to overturn the result and use electors loyal to Trump, but Cutler declined, saying that the legislature had no power to overturn the state's chosen slate of electors.

Conservative television outlets amplified baseless allegations of voting machine fraud. Fox News host Lou Dobbs had been outspoken during his program supporting the allegations, but on December 18 his program aired a video segment debunking the allegations, although Dobbs himself did not comment. Fox News hosts Jeanine Pirro and Maria Bartiromo had also been outspoken in supporting the allegations, and both their programs aired the same video segment debunking the allegations over the following two days.

Smartmatic, a company accused of conspiring with Dominion, demanded a retraction from Fox News. Smartmatic wanted corrections to be "published on multiple occasions" during prime time to "match the attention and audience targeted with the original defamatory publications". They also threatened legal action. On February 4, 2021, Smartmatic filed a lawsuit against Dobbs, Bartiromo, Pirro, and Fox News itself, as well as against Rudy Giuliani and Sidney Powell, seeking $2.7 billion in total damages.

In December 2020, Dominion sent a similar letter to Sidney Powell, demanding that she retract her allegations and retain all relevant records; the Trump legal team later instructed dozens of staffers to preserve all documents for any future litigation. The company filed $1.3 billion defamation suits against Powell in January 2021. While fighting the lawsuit in March 2021, Powell's attorneys claimed that her speech was protected because she was sharing her "opinion" and that, because she was serving as an attorney for the Trump campaign, it was her role to make accusations against Dominion. Dominion had complained that Powell's comments were "wild", "outlandish", and "impossible". Powell's attorneys seemed to concede that Powell had been obviously lying, saying that "reasonable people would not accept such statements as fact" and therefore that she had not defamed Dominion.

In internal Fox News communications, several prominent network hosts and senior executives—including chairman Rupert Murdoch and CEO Suzanne Scott—discussed their knowledge that the election fraud allegations they were reporting were false. The communications showed the network was concerned that not reporting the falsehoods would alienate viewers and cause them to switch to rival conservative networks, impacting corporate profitability. In a deposition in the Dominion Voting Systems lawsuit, Murdoch said: "I would have liked us to be stronger in denouncing it [the false allegations], in hindsight". The communications and deposition were reported in February 2023.

Multiple conspiracy theories were promoted, such as the claim that billionaire donor George Soros "stole the election". Another is Italygate, a QAnon-adjacent theory originating from a fake news website, which claimed that the election was rigged in Biden's favor by the U.S. Embassy in Rome, using satellites and military technology to remotely switch votes from Trump to Biden. There is no evidence to support this. Republican congressman Scott Perry texted White House Chief of Staff Mark Meadows a link to a YouTube video making the allegation. The New York Times later reported that, during Trump's last weeks in office, Meadows emailed the video to the Department of Justice, seeking an investigation.

These conspiracy theories had multiple origins. They were promoted by Trump and other individuals, and were heavily pushed and expanded on by far-right news organizations such as One America News Network (OANN), Newsmax, and The Gateway Pundit, as well as by Sean Hannity and some other Fox News commentators. RT, a Russian state media outlet, also promoted the Trump campaign's false claims of electoral fraud.

The Gateway Pundit published an August 2021 article reporting analysis conducted by Seth Keshel, a former Army intelligence officer, purporting to prove election fraud and that Trump actually won seven states carried by Biden. The analysis was false. Keshel was among a group of military-intelligence veterans including former Trump national security advisor Michael Flynn who played central roles in spreading false information about the election.

=== Threats of violence by Trump supporters ===
After Biden won the election, angry Trump supporters threatened election officials, election officials' family members, and elections staff in at least eight states via emails, telephone calls and letters; some of the menacing and vitriolic communications included death threats. Officials terrorized by the threats included officials in the swing states of Wisconsin, Pennsylvania, Michigan, Nevada, and Arizona, as well as a few less competitive states. Some officials had to seek police protection or move from their homes due to the threats. The director of the nonpartisan, nonprofit Center for Election Innovation & Research, described the threats as frightening and said, "These threats often go into areas related to race or sex or anti-Semitism. More than once they specifically refer to gun violence." Prominent Republicans ignored or said little about the threats of violence.

On November 15, the Georgia Secretary of State reported that he and his wife were receiving death threats. On November 30, Trump attorney Joseph diGenova said the recently fired head of the Cybersecurity and Infrastructure Security Agency, Chris Krebs, should be "taken out and shot" for disputing the president's claims about election fraud. On December 1, Republican Georgia elections official Gabriel Sterling publicly condemned Trump and Georgia Senators Perdue and Loeffler for making unsubstantiated claims and for failing to condemn the threats of violence against election workers, including those made against a young, low-level Dominion employee and his family. After Democratic Georgia State Senator Elena Parent spoke out against the false claims of voter fraud, she was targeted by online vitriol, threatened with death and sexual violence, and had her home address widely circulated online. Parent attributed the onslaught to Trump, saying, "He has created a cult-like following and is exposing people like me across the country to danger because of his unfounded rhetoric on the election".

In early December, an "enemies list" circulated on the web falsely accusing various government officials and voting systems executives of rigging the election, providing their home addresses, and superimposing red targets on their photos.

The Arizona Republican Party twice tweeted that supporters should be willing to "die for something" or "give my life for this fight". Ann Jacobs, chairwoman of the Wisconsin Elections Commission, said she had received constant threats, including a message mentioning her children, and photos of her house had been posted on the web.

On January 1, 2021, Vice President Mike Pence asked a federal judge to dismiss a suit naming him as the defendant; filed by Texas Republican congressman Louis Gohmert and others, the ultimately unsuccessful suit asserted that the vice president had the sole constitutional authority to conduct the congressional certification of Electoral College results without restriction. Attorney Lin Wood, a conspiracy theorist and QAnon promoter who had worked with Trump attorney Sidney Powell to file baseless lawsuits alleging election fraud, tweeted that day that Pence and other prominent Republican officials should be arrested for treason and that Pence should "face execution by firing squad". Two weeks earlier, Wood had tweeted that people should stock up on survival goods, including "2nd Amendment supplies". Emerald Robinson, a White House correspondent for pro-Trump One America News, tweeted "Folks, when [Lin Wood] tells people to prep, I listen".

After Trump urged his supporters to protest in Washington as Congress convened to certify the election results, some posters in far-right online forums interpreted it as a call to action, with one asserting, "We've got marching orders", while others made references to possible violence and to bringing firearms to the protest. In a discussion of how to evade police blockades and the District of Columbia's gun laws, one poster remarked, "We The People, Will not tolerate a Steal. No retreat, No Surrender. Restore to my President what you stole or reap the consequences!!!"

== December 2020 ==
On December 1, 2020, U.S. Attorney General William Barr said U.S. attorneys and FBI agents had investigated complaints and allegations of fraud, but found none of significance. On December 3, 2020, Director of National Intelligence John Ratcliffe said no evidence had yet been found of foreign interference.

Former Trump National Security Advisor Michael Flynn, who had received a presidential pardon shortly after the election, on December 1 publicly called on the president to suspend the Constitution, silence the press, and hold a new election under military supervision.

=== Trump's attempt to pressure state officials ===
On December 5, Trump placed a call to Georgia governor Brian Kemp in which he urged the governor to call a special session of the state legislature to override the election results and appoint electors who would support Trump. He also called the Pennsylvania speaker of the house with similar objectives, and had earlier invited Michigan Republican state officials to the White House to discuss election results in that state. The Georgia and Pennsylvania contacts were made after Biden's victories had been certified in those states; Biden's Michigan victory was certified three days after the Trump White House meeting.

After Georgia had twice recounted and twice certified its results, Republican secretary of state Brad Raffensperger received death threats. He was pressured to resign by others in his party, including the state's two senators. On December 23, Trump called the investigations chief in the Georgia Secretary of State's office, who was then investigating allegations of mail ballot fraud, and urged the official to "find the fraud" (a misquote that was amended by The Washington Post in March 2021 to "[you would] find things that are gonna be unbelievable"); the investigation ultimately concluded that the allegations had no merit. Texas attorney general Ken Paxton sued the state and three others, asking the U.S. Supreme Court to invalidate the states' voting results, alleging that they had violated the Constitution, citing a litany of complaints that had already been rejected by other courts. Trump and seventeen Republican state attorneys general filed motions to support the case, the merits of which were sharply criticized by legal experts and politicians. The day the suit was filed, Trump warned Georgia attorney general Chris Carr to not rally other Republican officials in opposition to the suit.

On December 4, 2020, 64 Republican members of the Pennsylvania General Assembly signed a letter urging the state's congressional delegation to reject Biden's electoral votes. Kim Ward, the Republican majority leader of the Pennsylvania senate, said that Trump had called her to say there had been fraud in the election, but she had not seen the letter before it had been released. She stated that Republican leaders were expected to support Trump's claims and if she had announced opposition to the letter, "I'd get my house bombed tonight".

On December 10, 2020, after several lawsuits had been dismissed, Trump tweeted, "This is going to escalate dramatically. This is a very dangerous moment in our history. ... The fact that our country is being stolen. A coup is taking place in front of our eyes, and the public can't take this anymore."

=== Supreme Court petitions ===
Before and after the election, Trump said he expected the outcome would be decided by the Supreme Court, where conservative justices held a 6–3 majority, with three of the justices having been appointed by Trump.

On November 21, a group of Republican legislators in Pennsylvania petitioned the U.S. Supreme Court in appeal of a Pennsylvania Supreme Court decision against the legislators, who had asked to nullify mailed ballots after they had been cast, or to direct the legislature to select Pennsylvania's electors. The high court denied the request in a one-sentence, unsigned order on December 8. By the time of the high court's decision, the Pennsylvania election results had been certified in Biden's favor. Lawyers for Pennsylvania argued to the high court that the legislators' request was "an affront to constitutional democracy" and that "Petitioners ask this court to undertake one of the most dramatic, disruptive invocations of judicial power in the history of the Republic; no court has ever issued an order nullifying a governor's certification of presidential election results".

On December 8, 2020, Texas attorney general Ken Paxton sued the states of Georgia, Michigan, Wisconsin and Pennsylvania, where certified results showed Joe Biden had won, alleging a variety of unconstitutional actions in their presidential balloting, arguments that had already been rejected in other courts. Paxton asked the U.S. Supreme Court to invalidate those states' 62 electoral votes, allowing Trump to be declared the winner of a second presidential term. This case, Texas v. Pennsylvania, was hailed by Trump as "the big one". Seventeen Republican state attorneys general filed amicus briefs to support the case and 126 Republican members of the House of Representatives signed onto it. On December 11, the Supreme Court said it would not hear the case. In denying the plaintiff's motion to invalidate those votes, it said that "the state of Texas' motion" had "lack of standing". Ted Cruz, who had previously argued nine cases before the Supreme Court, agreed to Trump's request to argue the Paxton suit should it come before the Court.

In late December attorneys Chesebro and Troupis asked the Supreme Court to review whether competing slates of electors from seven contested states could be considered by Congress on January 6. The Supreme Court declined their request for an opinion.

On December 31, lawyer Kenneth Chesebro emailed other members of Trump's legal team, saying that U.S. Supreme Court Justice Clarence Thomas was "key" and proposing that they "frame things so that Thomas could be the one to issue" an order to undermine Georgia's election results. Trump lawyer John Eastman responded in agreement.

=== Consideration of special counsel and martial law ===
After legal efforts by Trump and his proxies had failed in numerous state and federal courts, including the Supreme Court, some right-wing activists and Trump allies – including Michael Flynn, Sidney Powell, and L. Lin Wood – suggested that Trump could suspend the Constitution, declare martial law and "rerun" the election. Many retired military officers, attorneys, and other commentators expressed horror at such a notion. (Note: Trump's Assistant Secretary of Defense for International Security Affairs nominee Scott O'Grady and Virginia State Senator Amanda Chase, a candidate in Virginia's 2021 gubernatorial election, promoted debunked conspiracy claims and called for Trump to institute martial law. North Carolina State Senator Bob Steinburg similarly promoted false claims of a "stolen" election and suggested that Trump should declare a national emergency, invoke the Insurrection Act of 1807, and suspend civil liberties and habeas corpus.) Trump held an Oval Office meeting on December 18 with Rudy Giuliani, Chief of Staff Mark Meadows, White House Counsel Pat Cipollone, Powell, and Flynn. At the meeting, Trump entertained the idea of naming Powell, who has promoted election conspiracy theories and falsehoods, as special counsel to investigate election matters, though most advisors in attendance strongly opposed the idea. Two executive orders were drafted to appoint a special counsel and confiscate voting machines, which Trump falsely claimed were rigged against him. One order called for the Pentagon to seize machines, while the other tasked the Department of Homeland Security. At Trump's direction, Giuliani called Ken Cuccinelli, the second in command at DHS, on December 17 to ask if the department could seize the machines, but Cuccinelli said it did not have the authority. On Giuliani's advice, Trump had rejected a recommendation from Flynn and Powell to have the Pentagon seize the machines, and Bill Barr flatly rejected the president's suggestion that the Justice Department do it. Flynn reportedly discussed his idea to declare martial law, although others also resisted that idea, and Trump's opinion on the matter was unclear. That same day, Flynn appeared on Newsmax TV to suggest that Trump had the power to deploy the military to "rerun" the election in the swing states that Trump had lost. Trump dismissed reports about a discussion of martial law as "fake news", but it remained unclear whether he had endorsed the notion.

An attempt by Trump to invoke martial law to invalidate the results of the election would be illegal and unconstitutional. In late December 2020, legal scholars Claire O. Finkelstein and Richard Painter wrote that while it was very unlikely that Trump would actually "attempt to spark a military coup", Acting Attorney General Jeffrey A. Rosen should be prepared to direct federal law enforcement "to arrest anyone, including if necessary the president, who ... conspired to carry out this illegal plan". Likening a hypothetical invocation of martial law to overturn the election to the 1861 firing on Fort Sumter, Finkelstein and Painter wrote that any such plan would constitute seditious conspiracy and possibly other crimes, and that any military officers or enlisted personnel ordered to assist in such a plan would be required, under the Uniform Code of Military Justice, to disregard such an illegal order.

On December 18, Army Secretary Ryan McCarthy and General James McConville, the Army chief of staff, issued a joint statement saying, "There is no role for the US military in determining the outcome of an American election". On January 3, all ten living former secretaries of defense – Ashton Carter, Dick Cheney, William Cohen, Mark Esper, Robert Gates, Chuck Hagel, James Mattis, Leon Panetta, William Perry and Donald Rumsfeld – published an op-ed in The Washington Post calling for the orderly and peaceful transfer of power, noting that "efforts to involve the US armed forces in resolving election disputes would take us into dangerous, unlawful and unconstitutional territory", and noting that "civilian and military officials who direct or carry out such measures would be accountable, including potentially facing criminal penalties, for the grave consequences of their actions on our republic". The former defense secretaries wrote that "acting defense secretary Christopher C. Miller and his subordinates – political appointees, officers and civil servants – are each bound by oath, law and precedent to facilitate the entry into office of the incoming administration, and to do so wholeheartedly. They must also refrain from any political actions that undermine the results of the election or hinder the success of the new team."

Elizabeth Neumann, an adviser at Defending Democracy Together and a former assistant secretary of Homeland Security under Trump, stated that "In the conspiratorial conservative base supporting Trump, there are calls for using the Insurrection Act to declare martial law. When they hear that the president is actually considering this, there are violent extremist groups that look at this as a dog whistle, an excuse to go out and create ... violence."

=== Planning for Congress to overturn the election on January 6 ===
On December 21, Congressman Mo Brooks, who had been the first member of Congress to announce he would object to the January 6, 2021 certification of the Electoral College results, organized three White House meetings between Trump, Republican lawmakers, and others. Attendees included Trump, Vice President Pence, representatives Jody Hice (R-Ga.), Jim Jordan (R-Ohio), and Andy Biggs (R-Ariz.), representative-elect Marjorie Taylor Greene (R-Ga.), and members of the Trump legal team. The purpose of the meetings was to strategize about how Congress could overturn the election results on January 6. Brooks confirmed after one such meeting that it had been "a back-and-forth concerning the planning and strategy for January the 6th".

Talking Points Memo reported in December 2022 that it had obtained the 2,319 text messages Meadows had provided to the January 6 committee, including 450 showing Meadows communicating with 34 Republican members of Congress about plans to overturn the election.

=== Pressure on Pence ===
In the run-up to election certification on January 6, attempts to uncover significant election fraud bore no fruit and related legal challenges were rejected by the courts. Hence, those seeking to overturn the election focused attention increasingly on then-vice-president Mike Pence. The Twelfth Amendment to the United States Constitution requires the President of the Senate, which was Pence for the January 6 certification of the presidential election, to supervise the counting of electoral ballots at a joint session of the Congress. The Trump team developed multiple theories about how the Vice President might act on January 6 to aid the overturning of election results and repeatedly encouraged him to act accordingly.

==== "Pence card" theory ====
Beginning in late December, false legal theories went viral on pro-Trump social media suggesting that Vice President Pence could invoke a "Pence Card", a supposed legal loophole that would enable him, in his capacity as president of the Senate, to reject electoral votes for Biden from contested swing states on the grounds that they had been cast by fraudulently appointed electors. These theories originated from Ivan Raiklin, an attorney and former Green Beret who was among a small group of military-intelligence veterans associated with Michael Flynn who were instrumental in spreading false information alleging the 2020 election had been stolen from Trump.

The theory stems from a misreading of sections 2 and 12 of title 3, United States Code; the first of these sections (now since-repealed) concerned a state's failure to make an electoral choice on the prescribed day and the latter directs the vice president to request electoral vote certificates from any state that has not yet sent these votes to the National Archives by the fourth Wednesday in December. Under the theory, Pence had unilateral authority to declare that state certificates from contested states had not in fact been received, and that new certificates (presumably supporting President Trump) should be issued, or that those states had a "failed election" for which new certificates (again, presumably supporting President Trump) should likewise be issued.

Trump retweeted a post of Raiklin's calling for the invocation of the Pence Card on December 23, the day specified in statute, but Pence took no action consistent with the theory. In late December, Pence called former vice president Dan Quayle for advice, and Quayle told him (according to reporters Bob Woodward and Robert Costa): "Mike, you have no flexibility on this. None. Zero. ... I do know the position you're in. I also know what the law is. ... You have no power." Although the fourth Wednesday had passed, Trump still believed that Pence had the authority to reject electoral votes, and kept asking him to do so; however, over lunch on January 5, Pence informed Trump that he did not believe he had any such authority.

Attorney John Eastman incorrectly told Pence in a January 5 Oval Office meeting that Pence had the constitutional authority to block the certification, which Trump reportedly urged Pence to consider. Eastman also sent to Republican senator Mike Lee a six-point plan of action for Pence to set aside electors in seven states, which Lee rejected. By January 5, Trump was continuing to assert that Pence had unilateral power to throw out states' official electoral certificates on grounds of fraud. During the Capitol attack, numerous rioters chanted "Hang Mike Pence", and the phrase trended on Twitter until the website banned it. In March, when ABC News' Jonathan Karl asked Trump if he was worried about Pence while the crowd was chanting, Trump defended the crowd, saying they were "very angry" and that it was "common sense" that they would want to stop Congress from certifying the election result. Of Pence, Trump said, "I thought he was well protected and I had heard that he was in good shape". (Note: The audio was released later in 2021.)

Dozens of lawmakers from five key states wrote Pence on January 5 asking him to delay for ten days the final certification of electors scheduled for the following day, to allow them an opportunity to open special legislative sessions to decertify their electors and submit a new slate of electors. This came three days after Trump, Giuliani, and Eastman held a conference call with 300 legislators to present them purported evidence of election fraud. Ted Cruz, a decades-long friend of Eastman, proposed a complementary plan in the Senate, garnering the support of ten other senators.

In January 2022, as Congress began debating whether to amend the 1887 Electoral Count Act to make it clearer that the vice-president has no power to overturn an election, Trump released a statement asserting, falsely, that Pence did have such power: "Unfortunately, he didn't exercise that power, he could have overturned the Election!" and "they now want to take that right away". Pence responded several days later while addressing the Federalist Society: "President Trump is wrong. ... Under the Constitution, I had no right to change the outcome of our election."

==== December timeline ====
John Eastman, author of the Eastman memos, began working with the Trump team in November 2020. Trump adviser Peter Navarro claimed that the "Green Bay Sweep" plan was developed over weeks prior to January 6, 2021.

On December 13, Trump allies in the House were developing a plan involving Pence "to use Congress's tallying of electoral results on Jan. 6 to tip the election to President Trump". Kenneth Chesebro emailed Rudy Giuliani and others pointing out that, if Pence were to recuse himself, Republican senator Chuck Grassley of Iowa would be in charge of certifying the election, and if Grassley were to delay doing so, this would give Trump more time for court battles. Chesebro's subject line called this the "'President of the Senate' strategy".

On December 21, Trump's legal advisors, Pence, and multiple members of Congress at a White House meeting discussed ways to challenge the January 6 certification process and results.

On December 23, Trump re-tweeted the Ivan Raiklin "Operation Pence Card" memo while stating "America @VP @Mike_Pence MUST do this, tomorrow To defend our Constitution from our enemies ... Let him know!"

On December 24, a Trump aide contacted John Eastman to request documentation of his legal theories concerning the certification process including the role of the vice president, resulting in the Eastman memos.

On December 27, a lawsuit seeking to force action by Pence during the January 6 certification, Gohmert et al. v. Pence, was filed in a Texas court.

On December 31, then-White House Chief of Staff Mark Meadows e-mailed a memo prepared by Jenna Ellis, a legal advisor to the Trump campaign, to one of Pence's top aides. The memo claimed that the Vice President should not open electoral ballots from six states "that have electoral delegates in dispute", and should defer the eventual count of electoral delegates until January 15.

=== Pressure on Justice Department ===
On December 14, two weeks after Barr stated there was no evidence of significant election fraud, Trump announced that Barr would be leaving as attorney general by Christmas. Before Trump's announcement, he enlisted Chief of Staff Mark Meadows and other aides to pressure deputy attorney general Jeffrey Rosen, who would replace Barr on December 23, and other Justice Department officials to challenge the election results. Meadows and a top Trump aide emailed allegations of voting anomalies in three states to Rosen and other officials. Meadows also sought to have Rosen investigate a conspiracy theory, promoted by a Giuliani ally, that satellites and military technology had been used in Italy to remotely change votes from Trump to Biden. Trump also enlisted a private attorney, Kurt Olsen, to seek a meeting with Rosen to propose a legal challenge he had drafted; it was similar to a challenge initiated by Texas attorney general Ken Paxton and supported by dozens of Republican members of Congress and state attorneys general, that attempted unsuccessfully to have the Supreme Court reject election results in four states. Trump also spoke to Rosen about Olsen's proposal. Rosen and his deputy Richard Donoghue resisted the efforts, exchanging emails mocking them, in one case, as "pure insanity". Rosen later testified to Congress, "During my tenure, no special prosecutors were appointed, whether for election fraud or otherwise; no public statements were made questioning the election; no letters were sent to State officials seeking to overturn the election results; [and] no DOJ court actions or filings were submitted seeking to overturn election results".

In late December, Trump reportedly phoned Rosen "nearly every day" to tell him about claims of voter fraud or improper vote counts. Donoghue took notes of a December 27, 2020, phone call between him, Rosen and Trump in which he characterized the president saying, "Just say that the election was corrupt + leave the rest to me and the R. Congressmen". The next day Jeffrey Clark, acting assistant attorney general for the civil division, approached Rosen and Donoghue with a draft letter and requested them to sign it. The letter was addressed to officials in the state of Georgia, saying that the Justice Department had evidence that raised "significant concerns" about the outcome of the presidential election, contrary to what Barr had publicly announced weeks earlier, and suggesting that the Georgia legislature "call itself into special session for [t]he limited purpose of considering issues pertaining to the appointment of Presidential Electors". Both Rosen and Donoghue refused to sign the letter, and it was never sent.

The Associated Press reported in December that Heidi Stirrup, an ally of Trump advisor Stephen Miller, who months earlier had been quietly installed at the Justice Department as the White House's "eyes and ears", had in recent days been banned from the building after it was learned she pressured officials for sensitive information about potential election fraud and other matters she could relay to the White House. Stirrup had also circumvented Justice Department management to extend job offers to political allies for senior Department positions and interfered with the hiring of career officials.

=== Pressure on Defense Department ===
According to ABC News reporter Jonathan Karl, Michael Flynn called senior Trump intelligence official Ezra Cohen and told him to take extreme actions, including seizing ballots, to prevent the election results from favoring the Democrat. Cohen did not entertain Flynn's orders, responding, "Sir, the election is over. It's time to move on." Flynn replied, "You're a quitter! This is not over! Don't be a quitter!"

Trump attorney Sidney Powell called Cohen shortly thereafter and attempted to enlist his help with a far-fetched claim involving then-CIA Director Gina Haspel. According to Karl's book, Powell told Cohen that "Haspel has been hurt and taken into custody in Germany. You need to launch a special operations mission to get her." The claim, a conspiracy theory, had been circulating among Powell's QAnon following for some time. The conspiracy theory falsely claimed that Haspel had been injured while on a secret CIA operation to seize an election-related computer server that belonged to a company named Scytl. Powell alleged to Cohen that the server contained evidence of "hundreds of thousands, maybe millions, of votes had been switched using rigged voting machines". Powell was under the impression that Haspel had been engaged in this operation with the aim of destroying the nonexistent evidence on that nonexistent server. According to the book, Cohen thought Powell sounded "out of her mind" and he quickly reported the call to the acting defense secretary.

A December 18, 2020, memo proposed that the Trump administration seek evidence that there had been foreign interference in favor of Biden. The memo laid out a plan for Acting Secretary of Defense Christopher Miller to use National Security Agency and Defense Department powers to seize phone and email records. One of Trump's informal advisers, Michael Pillsbury, described this as "amateur hour" perpetrated by people with no existing connection to Trump who were raising topics that the government had already "said there was no evidence for". In May 2021, Miller testified to the January 6 House committee that he had feared Trump might "invoke the Insurrection Act to politicize the military in an antidemocratic manner".

=== Plan to seize voting machines ===
The then-President's team also developed plans to have federal authorities seize voting machines from states where the election had been closely contested but won by Biden. News reports indicate that, at various points in the planning, the Justice Department, the Department of Defense, Department of Homeland Security, and the National Guard were considered as entities that would conduct the seizures. Several versions of a draft Executive Order that would authorize the seizures were prepared. Then-President Trump was reported to have reviewed the draft Executive Order authorizing seizure by the National Guard but, based on advice by (among others) Patrick Cipollone and Rudy Giuliani, he did not sign and issue it.

In June 2022, an email dated November 21, 2020, surfaced, sent by British biopharmaceuticals executive Andrew Whitney, who in August 2020 pitched to Trump in the Oval Office the toxic botanical extract oleandrin as a cure for COVID-19. The email included a draft "authorizing letter" to be presented by the president allowing three armed private companies to seize all voting machines and related materials, with assistance from U.S. Marshals. The email was sent to Doug Logan, the president of Cyber Ninjas, which later conducted the 2021 Maricopa County presidential ballot audit that sought but failed to find election fraud in that county, and to cybersecurity expert Jim Penrose, who had worked with Sidney Powell, Michael Flynn and Patrick M. Byrne, who were seeking access to voting machines in an attempt to find proof of election fraud.

=== Ellis memos ===
On New Year's Eve, Chief of Staff Mark Meadows sent a memo drafted by Trump attorney Jenna Ellis to a top Pence aide containing a detailed plan to overturn the election results. The plan entailed Pence returning the electoral results to six battleground states on January 6, with a deadline of January 15 for the states to return them. If any state did not return their electoral slate by that date, neither Trump nor Biden would hold a majority, so the election would be thrown to the House for a vote to determine the winner. Per the Constitution, in such a scenario the vote would be conducted on the basis of party control of state legislatures, with Republicans holding 26 of 50, presumably giving Trump the victory.

Ellis drafted a second memo dated January 5 which she shared with Trump personal attorney, Jay Sekulow. The memo argued that certain provisions of the Electoral Count Act that restricted Pence's authority to accept or reject selected electors were unconstitutional. She proposed that when Pence reached Arizona in the alphabetical order during the certification, he could declare the state's results as disputed and send all the electoral slates back to the states for "the final ascertainment of electors to be completed before continuing". Sekulow did not agree that Pence had such authority.

=== Plan to obtain National Security Agency data ===
In February 2022, The Washington Post obtained a memo of unknown provenance dated December 18, 2020, that had circulated among Trump allies and was shared with some Republican senators. The memo called for Trump to direct acting defense secretary Christopher Miller to obtain "NSA unprocessed raw signals data" in an effort to prove foreign interference in the election. The proposal called for Miller to direct three men named in the document to acquire the data. At least two Republican senators received the memo after a January 4 meeting at the Trump International Hotel attended by at least three senators and others, which had been arranged by Mike Lindell. The meeting centered around voting machines and alleged interference by China, Venezuela and other countries. The three men involved were not close to Trump and their names had not been previously reported in efforts to subvert the election. Miller said he was not aware of the memo and Trump did not act on it.

== January 2021 ==
On New Year's Day, White House director of personnel John McEntee sent a series of bullet points via text message to Pence's chief of staff to incorrectly assert that Thomas Jefferson "Used His Position as VP to Win" the 1801 election, which McEntee claimed "proves that the VP has, at a minimum, a substantial discretion to address issues with the electoral process". Jonathan Karl, the ABC News chief White House correspondent for the duration of the Trump administration, wrote a November 2021 profile of McEntee, characterizing him as particularly powerful because "Trump knew he was the one person willing to do anything Trump wanted".

Trump reportedly reached out to Steve Bannon for advice on his quest to overturn the election results. In early January, Bannon, John Eastman and Rudy Giuliani were operating what they called a "war room" or "command center" at the Willard Hotel near the White House with the goal of overturning the election results. Christina Bobb of the pro-Trump One America News was also a participant. Further related details of the effort to deny and overturn the election were also reported.

Justice Department officials pressured Atlanta's top federal prosecutor, B. J. Pak, to say there had been widespread voter fraud in Georgia, warning him that he would be fired if he did not. The White House forced Pak to resign on January 4, 2021.

On January 6, 2021, a joint session of Congress presided over by Vice President Pence and House Speaker Nancy Pelosi took place to count the electoral votes. Normally a ceremonial formality, the session was interrupted by a mob that attacked the Capitol. Trump had held a simultaneous rally on the Ellipse where he encouraged his supporters to march to the Capitol building.

Five lawyers who represented Trump resigned at the end of January 2021 after claiming he coerced them to repeat false claims of voter fraud.

=== Gohmert et al. v. Pence ===
On December 27, 2020, Republican representative Louie Gohmert of Texas and the slate of Republican presidential electors for Arizona filed a lawsuit in the US District Court for the Eastern District of Texas against Vice President Mike Pence, seeking to force him to decide the election outcome. Gohmert argued that the Electoral Count Act of 1887 was unconstitutional, that the Constitution gave Vice President Pence the "sole" power to decide the election outcome, and that Pence had the power to "count elector votes certified by a state's executive", select "a competing slate of duly qualified electors", or "ignore all electors from a certain state". Pence, represented by the Justice Department, moved to dismiss the case, since Congress, and not the vice president, was a more suitable defendant. The Justice Department also argued that "the Vice President – the only defendant in this case – is ironically the very person whose power [plaintiffs] seek to promote. A suit to establish that the Vice President has discretion over the count, filed against the Vice President, is a walking legal contradiction." Lawyers for Congress also supported Pence's position.

On January 1, 2021, U.S. District Judge Jeremy Kernodle dismissed the suit saying that due to the plaintiffs' lack of standing, the court lacked subject matter jurisdiction relating to the constitutional status of the Electoral Count Act. On appeal, the next day, the US Court of Appeals for the Fifth Circuit dismissed Gohmert's appeal in a unanimous decision by a three-judge panel.

=== Calls with state officials ===
On January 2, 2021, Trump, Giuliani, Eastman and others held a conference call with 300 legislators of key states to provide them purported evidence of election fraud to justify calling special sessions of their legislatures in an attempt to decertify their electors. Three days later, dozens of lawmakers from five key states wrote Pence to ask he delay the January 6 final certification of electors for ten days to allow legislators the opportunity to reconsider their states' certifications.

That same day, Trump held a one-hour phone call with Georgia Secretary of State Brad Raffensperger. Trump was joined by Chief of Staff Mark Meadows, trade adviser Peter Navarro, Justice Department official John Lott Jr., law professor John Eastman, and attorneys Rudy Giuliani, Cleta Mitchell and Kurt Hilbert. Raffensperger was joined by his general counsel Ryan Germany. Raffensperger recorded the call, reportedly doing so while recalling his November 13 call with Trump ally and South Carolina Senator Lindsey Graham, after which Graham made public statements about the discussion that were at odds with Raffensperger's recollection.

In the call with Raffensperger, Trump repeatedly referred to disproven claims of election fraud and urged Raffensperger to overturn the election, saying, "I just want to find 11,780 votes". Raffensperger refused, noting that Georgia had certified its results after counting the votes three times, and said at one point in the conversation, "Well, Mr. President, the challenge you have is the data you have is wrong". Trump issued a vague threat suggesting that Raffensperger and his general counsel Ryan Germany might be subject to criminal liability. After the Georgia call, Trump and his team spoke on Zoom with officials in Arizona, Michigan, Pennsylvania and Wisconsin.

Raffensperger told his advisers that he did not wish a recording or a transcript to be made public unless Trump made false claims about the conversation or attacked Georgia officials. On the morning of January 3, Trump tweeted that Raffensperger "was unwilling, or unable, to answer questions" about various election-related conspiracy theories endorsed by Trump. Raffensperger replied by tweet, "Respectfully, President Trump: what you're saying is not true. The truth will come out." Later that day, The Washington Post reported on the call and published the full audio and transcript (the Associated Press also obtained the recording that day).

Two months later, it was revealed that Trump had also called Raffensperger's chief investigator, Frances Watson, on December 23. He spoke to her for six minutes, during which he told her: "When the right answer comes out, you'll be praised".

Legal experts stated that Trump's attempt to pressure Raffensperger could have violated election law, including federal and state laws against soliciting election fraud or interference in elections. Election-law scholar Edward B. Foley called Trump's conduct "inappropriate and contemptible" while the executive director of Citizens for Responsibility and Ethics in Washington called Trump's attempt "to rig a presidential election ... a low point in American history and unquestionably impeachable conduct".

Democrats condemned Trump's conduct. Vice President-elect Harris, as well as Representative Adam Schiff, (the chief prosecutor at Trump's first impeachment trial) said that Trump's attempt to pressure Raffensperger was an abuse of power. Senator Dick Durbin as well as Representatives Ted Lieu and Kathleen Rice requested a criminal investigation, while others called Trump's conduct an impeachable offense. More than 90 House Democrats supported a formal censure resolution, introduced by Representative Hank Johnson of Georgia, to "censure and condemn" Trump for having "misused the power of his office by threatening an elected official with vague criminal consequences if he failed to pursue the president's false claims" and for attempting "to willfully deprive the citizens of Georgia of a fair and impartial election process in direct contravention" of state and federal law. In February 2021, Fulton County District Attorney Fani Willis opened a criminal investigation into the phone call along with the phone call made by Lindsey Graham. In January 2022, a panel of Fulton County judges agreed to Willis's request to impanel a special grand jury to compel testimony from individuals who had refused to cooperate.

Several House and Senate Republicans also condemned Trump's conduct, although no Republican described the conduct as criminal or an impeachable offense as of January 4. Republican senator Pat Toomey, who was not seeking reelection in 2022, called it a "new low in this whole futile and sorry episode", and commended "Republican election officials across the country who have discharged their duties with integrity over the past two months while weathering relentless pressure, disinformation, and attacks from the president and his campaign". Other congressional Republicans ignored or sought to defend Trump's Georgia call, including House Minority Leader Kevin McCarthy and Georgia Senator David Perdue, who told Fox News in an interview that he thought releasing the tape of the call was "disgusting".

=== Justice Department pressured and efforts made to replace acting attorney general ===
The day after Attorney General William Barr said he intended to resign, Trump began to pressure his planned replacement, Jeffrey Rosen, to help him fight the election results. In particular, Trump asked Rosen to file legal briefs supporting lawsuits against the election results; to announce Justice Department investigations of alleged serious election fraud; and to appoint special prosecutors to investigate Trump's unfounded allegations of voter fraud and accusations against Dominion Voting Systems. Rosen refused, as did his deputy, Richard Donoghue, as the Justice Department had already determined and announced that there was no evidence of widespread voter fraud. However, Trump continued to pressure them.

Despite these disagreements, Rosen became acting U.S. Attorney General on December 24 as originally planned. Trump continued to pressure Rosen, asking him to go to the Supreme Court directly to invalidate the election results, but Rosen – along with his predecessor Barr and former acting Solicitor General Jeffrey Wall – said such a case would have no basis and refused to file it.

Meanwhile, assistant attorney general Jeffrey Clark, acting head of the Civil Division, proposed himself as Rosen's replacement, suggesting to Trump that he would support the president's efforts to overturn the election results. Clark told Rosen and other top Justice Department officials that the Department should announce it was investigating serious election fraud issues. Clark drafted a letter to Georgia officials claiming the DOJ had "identified significant concerns that may have impacted the outcome of the election in multiple States" and urging the Georgia legislature to convene a special session for the "purpose of considering issues pertaining to the appointment of Presidential Electors". Rosen and his deputy Richard Donoghue rejected the suggestion, as the Department had previously determined and announced that there was no significant fraud. On January 3, Clark revealed to Rosen that Trump intended to appoint him in Rosen's place. Rosen, Donoghue, and head of the Office of Legal Counsel Steven Engel made a pact to resign if Rosen was removed. Confronted with the threat of mass resignations, the president backed away from the plan. In early August 2021, Rosen and Donoghue told the Justice Department inspector general and members of the Senate Judiciary Committee that Clark attempted to help Trump subvert the election. Rosen also told the Committee that Trump opened a January 3 Oval Office meeting with Rosen, Donoghue and Clark by saying, "One thing we know is you, Rosen, aren't going to do anything to overturn the election".

During the closing weeks of the Trump presidency, White House chief of staff Mark Meadows sent multiple emails to Rosen, asking him to investigate conspiracy theories, including that satellites had been used from Italy to remotely switch votes from Trump to Biden. Rosen did not open the investigation.

=== Preparations by chief of staff ===
During the days leading up to January 6, Chief of Staff Mark Meadows sent messages in support of preparing alternate Republican electors to replace those in some states in which Biden might win. He also claimed in an email that the National Guard would be ready to "protect pro Trump people".

Additionally, a PowerPoint presentation on how the election could be overturned was sent by email to Meadows on January 5. The presentation, circulated by retired Army Colonel Phil Waldron and apparently inspired by the ideas of Jovan Hutton Pulitzer, alleged foreign interference in the election and recommended that the president declare a national emergency to delay the certification, that Pence provide alternate electors, and that the military count votes. When Meadows was subpoenaed in September 2021 by the United States House Select Committee on the January 6 Attack, he provided the document to the Committee and stated that he had not acted on the plan it described. Of the broader context, U.S. Representative Ro Khanna said on December 15: "There were 20, 30 people who knew about it and were close to going through with it".

=== More pressure on Pence ===
In early January 2021, Trump and his supporters continued to pressure Pence into aiding their attempts to overturn election results during the January 6 certification. In early January, Trump criticized Pence for being "too honest" and warned him that people would "hate" him and believe he was "stupid".

On January 1, Trump aide John McEntee sent a memo to Pence's chief of staff, Marc Short, titled "Jefferson used his position as VP to win", suggesting that Pence could emulate Thomas Jefferson by taking the actions encouraged by Trump and his supporters.

On January 2 in an appearance on Fox News, Trump aide Peter Navarro claimed that Pence had authority to delay election certification and to require an audit of the states' election results. Navarro, a promoter of the Green Bay Sweep, was intimately involved with the election-overturn effort. His remarks elicited a public response from the Vice President's office.

On January 3, Eastman memos author John Eastman briefed Marc Short and vice-presidential counsel Greg Jacob on the arguments he had been presenting to Trump about the Vice President's certification role.

On January 4, Trump tweeted, "the vice president has the power to reject fraudulently chosen electors".

Later that day, Trump told an audience of thousands at a January 4 rally in Georgia, "I hope Mike Pence comes through for us ... Of course, if he doesn't come through, I won't like him quite as much".

On January 4 and 5, Trump met with Pence at the White House several times, attempting to persuade Pence to act as recommended by the Eastman memos; Eastman was present for at least one of the meetings.

Also, on January 5 – following a January 2 call between Trump, Giuliani, Eastman, and about 300 state legislators – several dozen of those legislators from five key states wrote to Pence and requested a 10-day delay of certification to allow reconsideration of the electoral results previously certified by those state legislatures.

Also on January 5, Eastman communicated with Jacob. That day, Jacob wrote a memo to Pence stating that Eastman's plan would violate multiple provisions of the Electoral Count Act and would assuredly be blocked in court, or if not considered by a court, would create an unprecedented political crisis and "the vice president would likely find himself in an isolated standoff against both houses of Congress...with no neutral arbiter available to break the impasse".

On January 5 or the early morning of January 6, after hearing from Pence and that he did not agree that the Vice President's power extended to actions that would change election results, Trump issued a statement falsely claiming that Pence was "in total agreement" with his contention that "the vice president has the power to act".

On January 6 in the morning, Trump called Pence and again attempted to secure his cooperation. Trump reportedly told Pence, "You can either go down in history as a patriot or you can go down in history as a pussy".

On January 6 at the rally preceding the 2021 United States Capitol attack, Trump said, "If Mike Pence does the right thing, we win the election", "Mike Pence is going to have to come through for us, and if he doesn't, that will be a sad day for our country", and "All Vice President Pence has to do is send it back to the states to recertify and we become president ...".

Other speakers at the January 6 rally, notably Giuliani and Eastman, also highlighted the actions being requested of Pence. After the rally, during the 2021 United States Capitol attack, rioters chanted "Hang Mike Pence" and displayed gallows complete with a hanging noose.

During the Capitol attack on January 6, Eastman emailed Jacob, who was with Pence in the Capitol, saying that the siege was occurring "because YOU and your boss did not do what was necessary".

Also, during the January 6 Capitol attack and resulting interruption of the certification process, Trump tweeted, "Mike Pence didn't have the courage to do what should have been done to protect our Country and our Constitution".

The certification process was interrupted for about 5 hours and 53 minutes (from 2:13 p.m. to 8:06 p.m.).

In a meeting arranged by Senior presidential advisor Jared Kushner, Trump and Pence met each other on January 11 for the purpose of reconciliation.

=== January 6 joint session ===
==== Senate efforts ====
In December 2020, several Republican members of the House, led by Representative Mo Brooks of Alabama, as well as Republican senator Josh Hawley of Missouri, declared that they would formally object to the counting of the electoral votes of five swing states won by Biden during the January 6, 2021, joint session. The objections would then trigger votes from both houses. At least 140 House Republicans reportedly planned to vote against the counting of electoral votes, despite the lack of any credible allegation of an irregularity that would have impacted the election, and the allegations' rejections by courts, election officials, the Electoral College and others, and despite the fact that almost all of the Republican objectors had "just won elections in the very same balloting they are now claiming was fraudulently administered".

Senate Majority Leader Mitch McConnell, who on December 15 had acknowledged Biden's victory the day after the Electoral College vote, privately urged his Republican Senate colleagues not to join efforts by some House Republicans to challenge the vote count, but he was unable to persuade Hawley not to lodge an objection. Hawley used his objection stance in fundraising emails. Eleven Republican senators and senators-elect Ted Cruz, Ron Johnson, James Lankford, Steve Daines, John Kennedy, Marsha Blackburn, Mike Braun, Cynthia Lummis, Roger Marshall, Bill Hagerty, and Tommy Tuberville – one-quarter of Senate Republicans – announced that they would join Hawley's challenge. However, many senators acknowledged that it would not succeed. On January 2, 2021, Vice President Pence had expressed support for the attempt to overturn Biden's victory. Neither Pence nor the 11 senators planning to object made any specific allegation of fraud; rather, they vaguely suggested that some wrongdoing might have taken place. Other Senate Republicans were noncommittal or opposed to the attempt by the 11 Republican senators to subvert the election results.

Objections to the electoral votes had virtually no chance of success, as Democrats had a majority in the House of Representatives and, although the Senate had a Republican majority, there was no majority for overturning the election results. Trevor Potter, a Republican former chairman of the Federal Election Commission and the president of the Campaign Legal Center, wrote that the counting joint session "gives Trump's die-hard supporters in Congress an opportunity to again provide more disinformation about the election on national television". After Senator John Thune, the second highest-ranking Senate Republican, said that the challenge to the election results would fail "like a shot dog" in the Senate, Trump attacked him on Twitter.

In early January, Trump began to pressure Pence to take action to overturn the election. As vice president, Pence presides over the Congressional session to count the electoral votes – normally a non-controversial, ceremonial event. For days beforehand, Trump demanded both in public and in private that Pence use that position to overturn the election results in swing states and declare Trump–Pence the winners of the election. Pence demurred that the law does not give him that power, but Trump falsely insisted that "The vice president and I are in total agreement that the vice president has the power to act". Pence ultimately released a statement stating: "It is my considered judgment that my oath to support and defend the Constitution constrains me from claiming unilateral authority to determine which electoral votes should be counted and which should not".

An hour before the joint session was set to start, the president's lawyer Rudy Giuliani tried to call freshman senator Tommy Tuberville but accidentally left a message in the voicemail of another senator, which was subsequently leaked to The Dispatch, stating that "we need you, our Republican friends, to try to just slow it down ... So if you could object to every state and, along with a congressman, get a hearing for every state, I know we would delay you a lot, but it would give us the opportunity to get the legislators who are very, very close to pulling their vote ... they have written letters asking that you guys adjourn and send them back the questionable ones and they'll fix them up".

==== House votes ====
At the January 6 session, after Republican senators had raised objections to Biden's electoral victory, the House debated and voted. A majority of Republicans, totaling 139 and including Republican leader Kevin McCarthy and his deputy Steve Scalise, voted to support at least one objection.

==== Report by Rep. Zoe Lofgren ====
At the end of February 2021, Democratic Rep. Zoe Lofgren, chair of the House Administration Committee, released a nearly 2,000-page report that examined the social media posts between election night and January 6 of Republican leaders who had voted against certifying the election results, writing "Many of former President Trump's false statements were made in very public settings. Had Members made similar public statements in the weeks and months before the January 6th attack? Statements which are readily available in the public arena may be part of any consideration of Congress' constitutional prerogatives and responsibilities."

=== Capitol attack ===
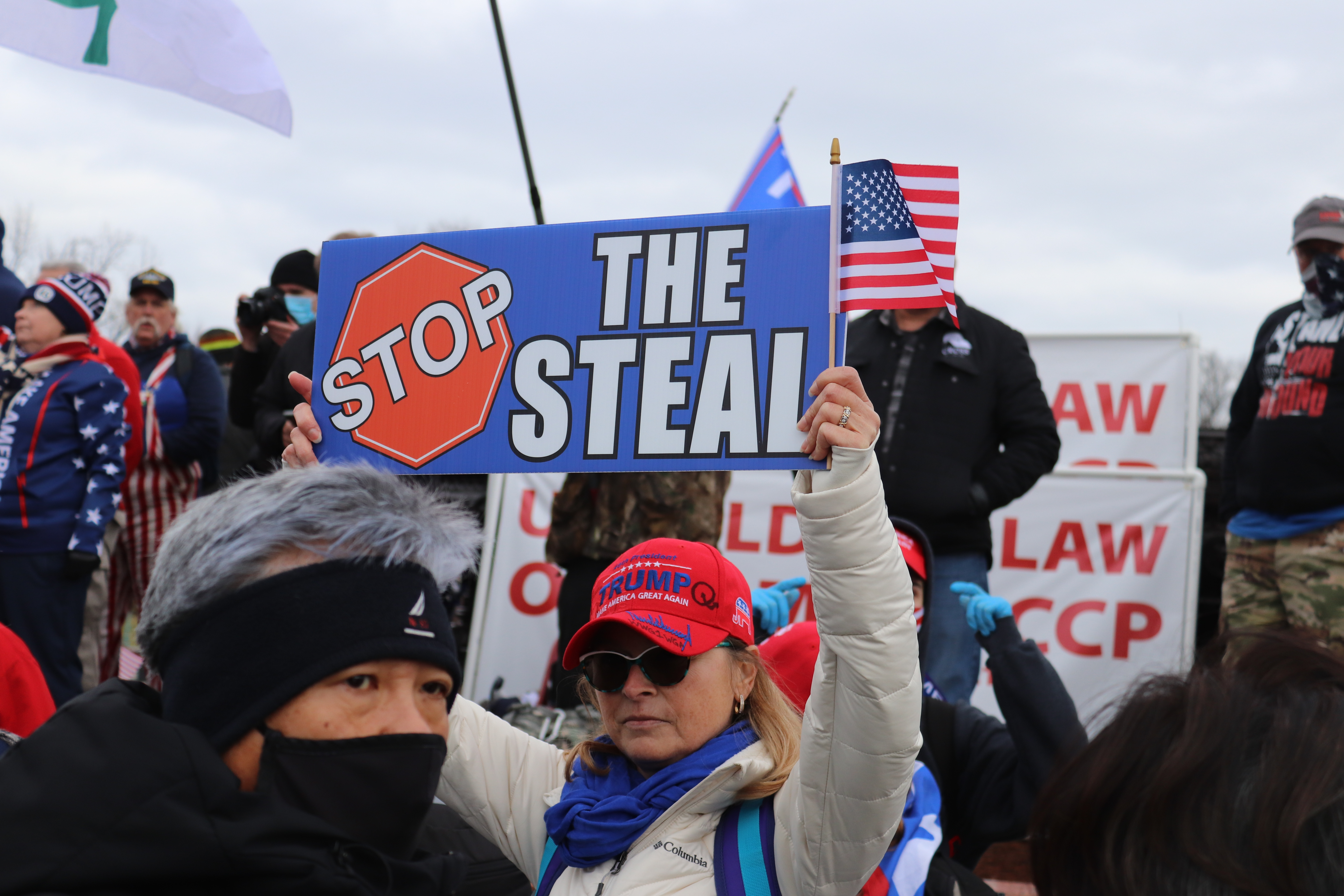
Protesters on Capitol grounds, January 6, 2021

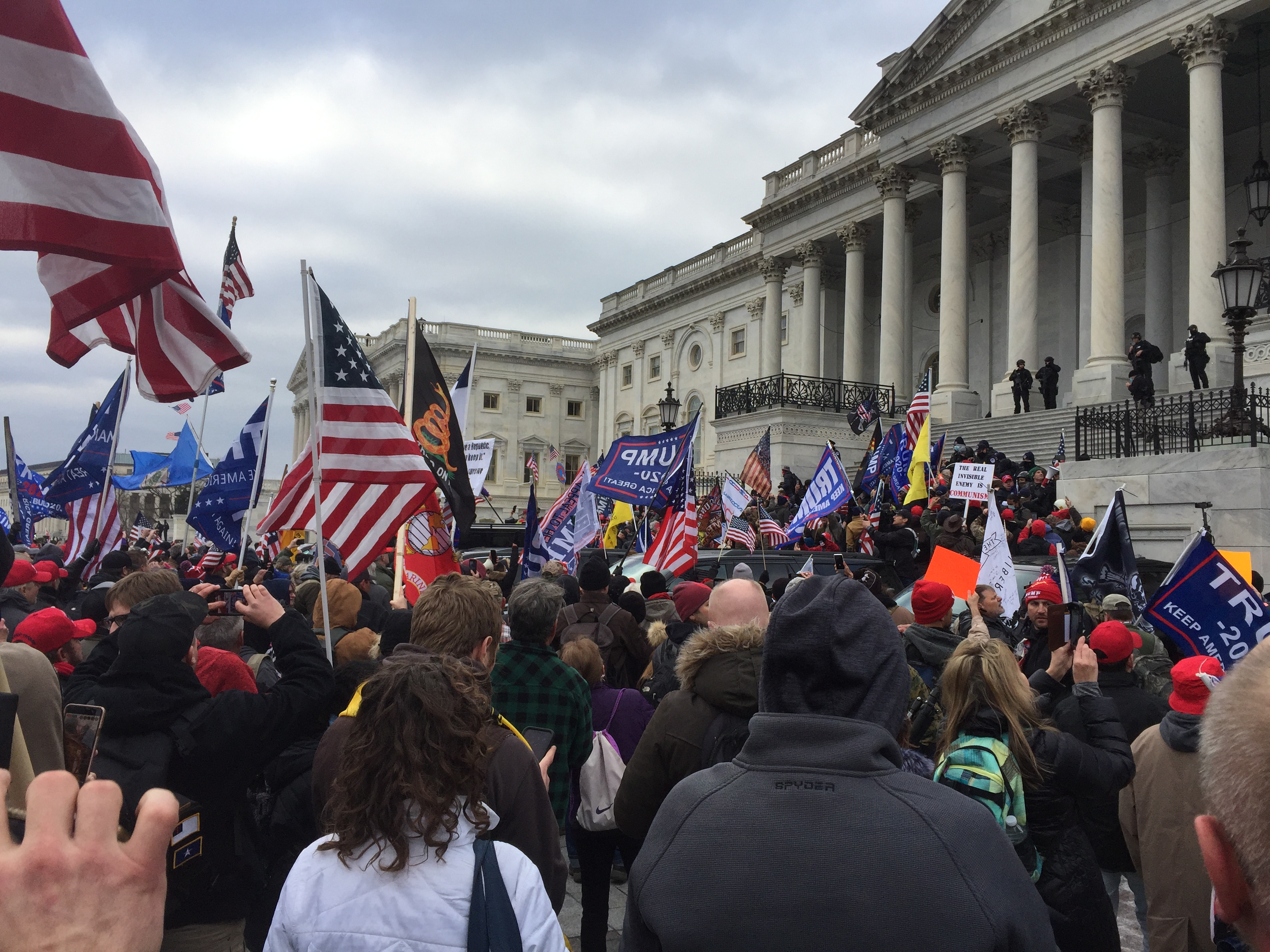
Rioters attacking the Capitol

Starting in December, Trump repeatedly encouraged his supporters to protest in Washington, D.C., on January 6 in support of his campaign to overturn the election results, telling his supporters to "Be there, will be wild!" The Washington Post editorial board criticized Trump for urging street protests, referring to previous violence by some Trump supporters at two rallies and his statement during a presidential debate telling the Proud Boys to "stand back and stand by". Multiple groups of die-hard Trump supporters staged rallies in Washington on that day: Women for America First; the Eighty Percent Coalition (also at Freedom Plaza) (the group's name refers to the belief that approximately 80% of Trump voters do not accept the legitimacy of Biden's win); and "The Silent Majority" (a group organized by a South Carolina conservative activist). George Papadopoulos and Roger Stone, ardent allies of Trump, headlined some of the events. In addition to the formally organized events, the Proud Boys, other far-right groups, and white supremacists vowed to descend on Washington on January 6, with some threatening violence and pledging to carry weapons. Proud Boys leader Enrique Tarrio said that his followers would "be incognito" and would "spread across downtown DC in smaller teams". On January 4, Tarrio was arrested by District police on misdemeanor and felony charges.

As the certification process was underway, Trump gave a speech encouraging his supporters to march to the Capitol. Many of them did, whereupon they joined other protesters already gathered in the area and violently breached and stormed the Capitol, eventually entering the Senate chamber as well as numerous offices. The Congressional proceedings were suspended, the legislators were taken to secure locations, and Nancy Pelosi was evacuated. Protestors penetrated the Senate chamber. One unarmed woman was shot and killed by Capitol Police inside the Capitol building after she attempted to climb through a broken door into the Speaker's Lobby, leading to the House chamber; the officer who shot her was placed on administrative leave pending an investigation, and was ultimately cleared of any wrongdoing. Another rioter died of a drug overdose, and three succumbed to natural causes. A Capitol Police officer died from a stroke the next day.

As the attack progressed, Pence was evacuated from the Senate chamber to a basement room, as Trump tweeted, "Mike Pence didn't have the courage to do what should have been done to protect our Country and our Constitution". The Secret Service prepared to evacuate Pence to Andrews Air Force Base. Carol Leonnig and Philip Rucker reported in their book I Alone Can Fix It that Pence was brought to his armored limousine but told his security chief Tim Giebels, "I'm not leaving the Capitol...If I get in that vehicle, you guys are taking off. I'm not getting in the car." Pence remained at the Capitol and certified the election results late that night.

On January 3, 2022, Newsweek reported, for the first time, the deployment of undercover commandos at the Capitol on January 6, 2021, to manage the "most extreme possibilities", including an attack on President Donald Trump or Vice President Mike Pence.

According to a January 3, 2022, CNN News report, the United States House Select Committee on the January 6 Attack has learned that Trump did nothing to stop the attack as it was unfolding. Leaders of the committee Bennie Thompson (D-MS) and Liz Cheney (R-WY) have characterized his failure to intervene, despite being asked to do so, as "dereliction of duty". In April 2022, Cheney stated:

It's absolutely clear that what President Trump was doing, what a number of people around him were doing, that they knew it was unlawful ... I think what we have seen is a massive and well-organized and well-planned effort that used multiple tools to try to overturn an election.

=== Trump operatives breach Coffee County, Georgia election system ===
On January 1, 2021, lawyers on Trump's team asked a Georgia tech firm to assist them in looking into voting systems in Coffee County, Georgia. On January 7, one of the fake electors in Georgia escorted two Trump operatives into the county's election office, and the Trump team copied data from the office.

Fani Willis examined this incident as part of the 2020 Georgia election investigation. On August 14, 2023, Trump and 18 co-defendants were indicted in the Georgia case, and four of the 19 defendants—Sidney Powell, Misty Hampton, Cathleen Latham, and Scott G. Hall—were charged in the Coffee County breach.

=== Lindell memo ===
On January 15, Trump ally and My Pillow CEO Mike Lindell visited the White House, where he was photographed carrying notes that appeared to suggest an additional attempt to overturn the election. The document bore a heading containing the words "taken immediately to save ... Constitution" and called for 780th Military Intelligence Brigade (Cyber) civilian lawyer "Frank Colon NOW as Acting National Security [illegible]", and mentioned the "Insurrection Act" and "martial law". It further recommended "[m]ov[ing] Kash Patel to CIA Acting" and made reference to Trump loyalist Sidney Powell.

== Later developments ==
=== Taxpayer costs ===
According to a Washington Post assessment published February 6, 2021, Trump's falsehoods about fraud had cost taxpayers more than half a billion dollars in spending to enhance security, resolve legal disputes and repair property, among other things.

=== Security concerns over March 4, 2021 ===
Security was bolstered in Washington, D.C., in preparation for March 4, which QAnon adherents, adopting a false belief from sovereign citizen ideology, believed would be the day Trump was re-inaugurated as president. The House prematurely ended its work for the week following an announcement by the Capitol Police of intelligence on a "possible plot" by an identified militia group to breach the Capitol building on that day. Ultimately, March 4 passed without any serious incidents being reported.

=== Election audits ===
Alleging fraud, during 2021 Republicans initiated or proposed audits in several states, in addition to the election audits done normally in some states, which do not always include the presidency.

An audit in Maricopa County, Arizona that began in April inspired Republicans in other states to pursue similar efforts, with some calling for audits in all fifty states. More than a year after the election, Trump supporters continued to pressure state election officials to investigate or decertify the outcome, even in states where Trump won by a large margin.

An Associated Press analysis published in December 2021 examined every potential case of voter fraud in the six battleground states that Trump had challenged. The analysis found 473 potential incidents. Even if all the incidents involved votes for Biden, which they did not, and involved ballots that were actually counted, which they did not, the number was far smaller than would have been necessary to change the election outcome. The analysis found no evidence of organized fraud but rather in virtually every case it involved an individual acting alone.

==== Arizona ====
On March 31, 2021, the Arizona Senate Republican caucus hired four firms to perform an audit of the presidential ballots in Maricopa County, with a Florida-based company called Cyber Ninjas being the lead firm. There was no stated purpose of overturning the election, and there is no mechanism under the Constitution by which the Congressional certification of the result could be reversed. Arizona Senate President Karen Fann said that the audit was not intended to overturn the state's election results, including at a July 15 hearing. Nevertheless, Trump and some of his supporters expressed the hope that the Arizona result would be changed and that there might be a "domino effect" in which other states changed their results.

The auditors released a report on September 24, 2021, finding no proof of fraud and that their ballot recount increased Biden's margin of victory by 360 votes. Following the audit, Arizona Governor Doug Ducey rejected calls for the state's election to be decertified or overturned.

In January 2022, Maricopa County election officials released a final report finding nearly every claim the auditors made was false or misleading. The next day, Cyber Ninjas announced it was shutting down, as a Maricopa County judge imposed a $50,000 contempt fine on the company for every day it refused to hand over documents as it had been ordered to do months earlier.

After a six-month investigation into alleged fraud by Maricopa County election officials in the 2020 presidential election, Arizona attorney general Mark Brnovich said in April 2022 that he found no proof of fraud. He released an interim report claiming that "serious vulnerabilities" had been identified, omitting his investigators' findings to the contrary and withholding the more complete report. Brnovich was succeeded by Kris Mayes. When Brnovich left office in January 2023, Mayes released the more complete report that had been written during Brnovich's tenure showing that none of the allegations against the Maricopa County election board had merit.

On April 23, 2024, Arizona indicted 11 fake electors and seven Trump allies and described five unindicted coconspirators.

==== Georgia ====
A group called VoterGA filed a lawsuit requesting to examine by microscope 150,000 Fulton County ballots that it asserted might be counterfeit. The suit arose after four Republican auditors involved with the November 2020 statewide audit and manual recount had claimed to see "pristine" absentee ballots that might have been computer-generated. On May 21, 2021, a Henry County Superior Court Judge, Brian Amero, agreed to unseal 147,000 absentee ballots from Fulton County. An October 2021 investigation by the Georgia Secretary of State's office found that there were no counterfeit ballots in the batches named by the complainants. That month, Amero dismissed the suit altogether, ruling the suit lacked standing because it "failed to allege a particularized injury".

Trump had claimed that about 5,000 dead people had voted in Georgia, but an examination by the State Election Board released in December 2021 found that four absentee ballots of dead people had been mailed in by relatives.

In December 2025, Fulton County officials admitted to counting hundreds of thousands of votes that had not been properly certified via signed tabulator tapes. However, Georgia Secretary of State Brad Raffensperger asserted that the final electoral votes for Georgia wouldn't have been affected even if the uncertified votes hadn't been counted.

==== Idaho ====
In September 2021, Bonner County, Idaho announced it would perform a recount of ballots cast in the election, in response to an allegation by election conspiracy theorist Mike Lindell that all 44 Idaho counties had been digitally hacked. Lindell provided a detailed list of IP addresses he asserted had been compromised. County Clerk Mike Rosedale stated that all county voting machines were fully airgapped from the Internet, also noting that seven Idaho counties don't use voting machines. Lindell alleged that a specific formula had been applied by hackers to flip votes from Trump to Biden. Rosedale said Lindell had not contacted his office before presenting his allegations. The Bonner audit, and audits of two other counties that don't use voting machines, affirmed the accuracy of the ballot count. Chief Deputy Secretary of State Chad Houck said Lindell would be sent a bill for the audits.

==== Pennsylvania ====
The Republican Commissioners agreed to a ballot audit in Fulton County, PA due to a subpoena threat from State Senator Doug Mastriano. Fulton County's audit was funded by Defending The Republic an organization founded by Trump's lawyer Sidney Powell. Defying a directive from the State's Board of Elections, the County allowed Wake Technology Services, Inc. to access voting machines. The company had originally performed the hand recount in Maricopa County's ballot audit. The original draft of its audit report concluded that Fulton's "election was well run [and] followed all Commonwealth and Federal guidelines". At a state Senate hearing, the Republican chairman of Fulton County's Board of Commissioners testified that his county's audit found nothing wrong.

By August 2021, Pennsylvania Republican lawmakers were preparing to hold formal hearings on the election and conduct a "full forensic investigation". Prior to the investigation, Senate President pro tempore Jake Corman made a statement asserting that the investigation is not meant to overturn the results of Pennsylvania's election and that the legislature does not have the authority to do so. The next month, Republicans approved subpoenas for a wide range of personal information on millions of voters who cast votes in the May primary and November general election. Republicans intended to hire private firms to manage the data. On September 23, 2021, Pennsylvania Attorney General Josh Shapiro filed a lawsuit seeking to block the subpoenas from being issued. On October 7, 2021, Corman said that he accepted the results of the election but also reaffirmed his support for the investigation.

==== Texas ====
The Texas attorney general's office, led by ardent Trump ally Ken Paxton, spent more than 22,000 staff hours investigating potential voting fraud in 2020. The investigation identified and prosecuted sixteen cases of false addresses on voter registration forms, among nearly 17 million registered voters in the state. This was half as many cases as two years earlier. A 2021 investigation found only three prosecutable cases among all elections in the state.

In September 2021, hours after Trump wrote to Texas governor Greg Abbott demanding an audit of the state's election results, the Texas secretary of state's office announced that audits had begun in four major counties. County officials and others in the secretary of state's office initially said they were unaware of any audit underway.

The audits were conducted by secretary of state John Scott, whom Abbott appointed in October 2021. Scott is a former state litigator who briefly joined Trump's legal team in 2020 to challenge the election results. He released preliminary findings of the audits in December 2021 that found few issues, including 17 votes cast by deceased voters and 60 cross-state duplicate votes among 3.9 million ballots cast. The duplicate votes remained under investigation.

==== Wisconsin ====
By May 2021, state election officials had identified 27 potential cases of voting fraud among 3.3 million ballots cast. Sixteen of those cases involved people using a UPS Store rather than their residence for their mailing address.

Trump and his allies filed multiple lawsuits challenging Wisconsin election results but lost all of them, including a series of decisions by the state Supreme Court. State Republicans initiated multiple types of investigations beginning in February 2021. That month, the Republican majority legislature voted to direct the nonpartisan Legislative Audit Bureau to conduct an examination of some election procedures.

In May 2021, Robin Vos, the Republican speaker of the Wisconsin state assembly, hired three retired police officers and an attorney to examine reported tips of potential election irregularities.

Janel Brandtjen, who chairs the Assembly elections committee, opened a "forensic audit" modeled after the Maricopa County, Arizona audit. She had traveled to Arizona to review that audit. Brandtjen issued subpoenas to two major counties for ballots and voting machines, but they were rejected because Vos had not signed them, as required by law. Vos indicated he did not intend to sign the subpoenas, which requested information that doesn't exist or doesn't apply to Wisconsin elections. Milwaukee County Clerk George Christenson asserted the subpoena he received was "clearly a cut and paste job" from similar election-related legal moves by Republicans in other states.

In June 2021, Vos selected Republican former Wisconsin Supreme Court justice Michael Gableman to conduct an investigation of the election. Gableman had been considered for a position in the Trump administration in 2017. Soon after the election, Gableman had voiced conspiracy theories about the outcome and had attended an August conference hosted by election conspiracy theorist Mike Lindell. He also consulted Shiva Ayyadurai, a conspiracy theorist whose work on the Arizona audit was discredited. Gableman issued subpoenas, later withdrawn, some of which contained errors and requested information that was already public. He later stated, "Most people, myself included, do not have a comprehensive understanding or even any understanding of how elections work". Gableman sent emails to election officials across the state asking them to retain information, but they came from a Gmail account associated with a different name and in some cases were blocked as a security concern or spam. Gableman compared a newspaper's coverage of his investigation to Nazi propaganda. In October, the office of Wisconsin attorney general Josh Kaul sent Gableman a nine-page letter characterizing the investigation as unlawful and called for it to be closed.

On October 22, 2021, the nonpartisan Legislative Audit Bureau released their findings of an audit ordered by Republicans in February 2021. The findings reported that there was no evidence of widespread voter fraud, and that State Senator Robert Cowles said that the election was "safe and secure". State Senator Kathy Bernier said that the audit found no evidence of any "attempt at vote fraud".

A ten-month review by the conservative Wisconsin Institute for Law and Liberty found in December 2021 that certain election procedures weren't adequately followed, but there was "little direct evidence of fraud, and for the most part, an analysis of the results and voting patterns does not give rise to an inference of fraud".

Gableman's 13-month investigation found no evidence of election fraud and cost taxpayers $2 million. Vos fired Gableman and multiple parties referred him to the Office of Lawyer Regulation of the Wisconsin Supreme Court on ethics complaints.

=== Mike Lindell reinstatement prediction ===
On March 29, 2021, businessman and Trump supporter Mike Lindell predicted on Steve Bannon's podcast that Trump would be back in office on "August 13", the day after his three-day cyber fraud conference in Sioux Falls, stating "it'll be the talk of the world". When President Joe Biden remained in office, Lindell moved his prediction for Trump's return to September 30, and then to the end of 2021.

Senate report on Trump's efforts to overturn the election

=== Senate Judiciary Committee report ===
On October 7, 2021, the Senate Committee on the Judiciary published their report on Trump's efforts to pressure the Department of Justice to overturn the results of the 2020 election.

=== Election law reform efforts ===
The Electoral Count Reform and Presidential Transition Improvement Act was passed on December 23, 2022. The Enhanced Election Security and Protection Act was also proposed in July 2022 but was not passed.

=== Post-election voter restriction efforts by Republicans ===
Following the 2020 United States presidential election and the unsuccessful attempts by Donald Trump and various other Republican officials to overturn it, Republican lawmakers initiated a sweeping effort to make voting laws more restrictive within several states across the country. According to the Brennan Center for Justice, as of October 4, 2021, more than 425 bills that would restrict voting access have been introduced in 49 states—with 33 of these bills enacted across 19 states so far. The bills are largely centered around limiting mail-in voting, strengthening voter ID laws, shortening early voting, eliminating automatic and same-day voter registration, curbing the use of ballot drop boxes, and allowing for increased purging of voter rolls. Republicans in at least eight states have also introduced bills that would give lawmakers greater power over election administration after they were unsuccessful in their attempts to overturn election results in swing states won by Democratic candidate Joe Biden in the 2020 election. The efforts garnered press attention and public outrage from Democrats, and by 2023 Republicans had adopted a more "under the radar" approach to achieve their goals.

=== Impact on State Secretaries of State ===
In multiple U.S. states, officials who work for the Secretary of State received threats following the election and were still receiving threats as of October 2021. Law enforcement generally was not prepared to provide ongoing security for these officials, as their positions had never before been considered high-risk.

=== House Select Committee on the January 6 Attack ===
In July 2021, the House Select Committee on the January 6 Attack was formed, largely along party lines.

At the first public hearing on June 9, 2022, the committee said that Trump had engaged in a seven-part conspiracy to overturn a free and fair democratic election, and they discussed it in the hearings that followed. According to Bennie Thompson, chair of the committee: "Jan. 6 was the culmination of an attempted coup, a brazen attempt, as one rioter put it shortly after Jan. 6, to overthrow the government ... The violence was no accident. It represents Trump's last stand, most desperate chance to halt the transfer of power." Trump, according to the committee, "lied to the American people, ignored all evidence refuting his false fraud claims, pressured state and federal officials to throw out election results favoring his challenger, encouraged a violent mob to storm the Capitol and even signaled support for the execution of his own vice president". On October 21, 2022, the committee subpoenaed Trump's testimony and relevant records. He sued the committee and never testified. On December 19, 2022, the committee criminally referred him to the Justice Department, though the Justice Department was already investigating.

=== 2021 German federal election ===
During the 2021 German federal election, the Center for Monitoring, Analysis and Strategy (CeMAS) found that false claims of voter fraud had become commonplace on Telegram in Germany, with accusations against Dominion Voting Systems being common despite the company's technology not being used in German elections. (Note: Since March 2009, all elections in Germany have been conducted exclusively with paper ballots which are tabulated by hand.) CeMAS researcher Miro Dittrich said, "We have seen far-right actors try to claim election fraud since at least 2016, but it didn't take off. When Trump started telling the 'big lie,' it became a big issue in Germany, sometimes bigger than the pandemic, because far-right groups and the AfD are carefully monitoring the success Trump is having with this narrative."

=== Justice Department investigations ===
By March 2022, Justice Department investigations of participants in the Capitol attack had expanded to include activities of Trump's inner circle leading up to the attack. A federal grand jury was empaneled. Later in 2022, a special counsel was appointed.

On August 1, 2023, Trump was indicted. The indictment described six alleged co-conspirators. However, following Trump's election to the presidency in November 2024, the case was dismissed at the request of special counsel Jack Smith, who cited the DOJ's policy of not prosecuting sitting Presidents. In January 2025, Smith resigned, and the special counsel released its report, saying that "the admissible evidence was sufficient to obtain and sustain a conviction at trial". With Trump in office again, the Office of Special Counsel announced on August 1, 2025, that it had opened an investigation into Smith, alleging that his investigations into Trump's actions had been politically motivated.

=== Civil lawsuits ===
In May 2022, a civil lawsuit was filed in Dane County, Wisconsin, against the ten Trump supporters who had presented themselves as alternate electors for that state.

=== Continuing subversion efforts and 2024 predictions ===
To sow election doubt, Trump has escalated use of "rigged election" and "election interference" statements in advance of the 2024 election compared to the previous two elections—the statements described as part of a "heads I win; tails you cheated" rhetorical strategy.

As of 2026, Trump has publicly continued to insist that the 2020 election was rigged and stolen, while still providing no evidence. It has been reported that Trump had admitted his loss to a group of historians in mid-2021, saying, "We had a deal all set, and then when the election was rigged and lost, what happened is that the deal went away".

On September 27, 2021, American legal scholar Laurence Tribe and colleagues described the legal background of the attempt to overturn the 2020 election, and named possible ways of averting the use of such a strategy in the future. On December 23, 2021, Tribe and colleagues wrote that Attorney General Merrick Garland ought to be "holding the leaders of the Jan. 6 insurrection – all of them – to account" to "teach the next generation that no one is above the law".

Joshua Keating warned that the playbook used up until this point to challenges the legitimacy of election results could result in a 'coup trap,' where countries suffering a coup attempt are more likely to see another. On December 17, 2021, The Washington Post published an opinion piece by three retired generals on the need to be prepared for a possible insurrection in 2024.

The New York Times reported later in April 2022 that Trump supporters were continuing to seek ways to overturn the election. John Eastman, state and federal legislators, and right-wing news outlets continued to press for state legislatures to rescind electoral votes for Biden, and to bring new lawsuits asserting large-scale voting fraud. The Times reported that Trump was privately insisting he could be returned to power as he also continued to consider another run for the presidency in 2024. Legal experts expressed concerns that efforts were being made to undermine public confidence in democracy to lay the groundwork for baselessly challenging future elections. Former federal appeals court judge J. Michael Luttig, a prominent conservative attorney for whom Eastman clerked, remarked:

At the moment, there is no other way to say it: This is the clearest and most present danger to our democracy. Trump and his supporters in Congress and in the states are preparing now to lay the groundwork to overturn the election in 2024 were Trump, or his designee, to lose the vote for the presidency.

On May 1, 2022, investigations by the House Select Committee into fundraising efforts by the Republican National Committee, based on their promotion of Trump's "big lie", have been supported by a federal judge.

On May 22, 2022, The New York Times presented a detailed analysis of the continuing efforts by Trump and his allies to further promote "the big lie" and related lies in their attempts to overturn and influence future elections, including those in 2022 and 2024.

In June 2022, the Republican Party in Texas adopted a statement that the election was illegitimate into its official party platform.

On July 9, 2022, after the Wisconsin Supreme Court ruling that ballot dropboxes must be placed inside election clerks' offices in the future, Trump called Wisconsin House Speaker Robin Vos and complained about dropboxes in the 2020 election. Vos said he told Trump that such an attempt to overturn the 2020 election was unconstitutional. Trump posted to Truth Social: "It's now up to Robin Vos to do what everybody knows must be done".

On August 29, 2022, Trump stated on Truth Social that he should be declared the president, or at least a new election should be held.

On December 3, 2022, following the release of information by Twitter CEO Elon Musk documenting Twitter executives' discussion of previously disclosed content moderation relating to the New York Post's story regarding Hunter Biden, Trump made comments on Truth Social suggesting the "termination" of the United States Constitution in order to overturn the outcome of the 2020 election.

At 2023 campaign events, Trump predicted (without evidence) there would be voter fraud benefiting Democrats in the 2024 election.

=== Post-election allegations of statistical improbabilities ===
In the aftermath of the election, numerous claims were made and began to circulate, stating that serious anomalies could be found, suggesting an election fraud. However, a paper entitled "No Evidence For Voter Fraud: A Guide To Statistical Claims About The 2020 Election" written by Justin Grimmer, Haritz Garro and Andrew C. Eggers, was published by the conservative Hoover Institution (February 3, 2021) concluded that the statistics used to "claim some election facts would be unlikely if there had been no fraud" were either not accurate in the first place or if they were accurate, weren't really surprising.

The Washington Post reported in February 2023 that soon after the election the Trump campaign paid researchers from Berkeley Research Group to examine a wide range of indicators that might suggest the election had been stolen. Trump, Meadows and others were briefed on the findings in December 2020. The analysis found no significant irregularities beyond those commonly found in all elections, and nothing that might have changed the election outcome. The findings were never publicly disclosed, though the Justice Department obtained the analysis and the Smith special counsel investigation examined the matter. The Post reported in April 2023 that the Trump campaign had hired a second firm, Simpatico Software Systems, days after the election to examine fraud allegations. The company delivered a report late in 2020, finding no evidence of fraud. The company's founder was subpoenaed for testimony by the Smith special counsel investigation in early 2023.

== Reactions ==
=== Republican critiques of the "big lie" ===
Dr. Eastman and President Trump launched a campaign to overturn a democratic election, an action unprecedented in American history. Their campaign was not confined to the ivory tower – it was a coup in search of a legal theory... If Dr. Eastman and President Trump's plan had worked, it would have permanently ended the peaceful transition of power, undermining American democracy and the Constitution. If the country does not commit to investigating and pursuing accountability for those responsible, the Court fears January 6 will repeat itself.
— Judge David O. Carter, United States district court

==== Administration dissenters ====
Hope Hicks told Trump to "move on". Trump replied, "Well, Hope doesn't believe in me". Hicks said, "No, I don't. Nobody's convinced me otherwise."

Kellyanne Conway claimed in her book that she told Trump privately to accept the loss, and he told her in response to "go back to your crazy husband".

Matthew Pottinger, a leading aide on Trump's China policy, quickly quit in what two sources said was an act of protest against the president's response to the rioting. He was followed by at least five other senior foreign policy aides. Transportation Secretary Elaine Chao, who is married to Senate Majority Leader Mitch McConnell, and Education Secretary Betsy DeVos also resigned in protest.

In June 2022, Ivanka Trump told the panel of the United States House Select Committee on the January 6 Attack that she does not believe the election was stolen and accepted William Barr's conclusion that voter fraud claims have "zero basis".

==== Consistent critics ====
In 2021, The Republican Accountability Project estimated that 6% of national Republicans politicians consistently stood-up for democracy. Other prominent Republicans who spoke out against attempts to subvert the election results included Governor Larry Hogan of Maryland, former House Speaker Paul Ryan, and Representative Liz Cheney of Wyoming, the third-highest-ranking Republican in the House. Former Republican governor of California, Arnold Schwarzenegger, wrote in The Economist that "President Donald Trump's actions to destroy faith in our elections and throw centuries of American principles out the window must be met with universal condemnation from all political leaders, regardless of party".

Longtime Republican strategist Steve Schmidt stated: "The Republican Party is an organized conspiracy for the purposes of maintaining power for self-interest, and the self-interest of its donor class... It's no longer dedicated to American democracy".

All ten living former secretaries of defense – including Dick Cheney, Donald Rumsfeld and Robert Gates – published an essay on January 3, 2021, stating: "The time for questioning the results has passed; the time for the formal counting of the electoral college votes, as prescribed in the Constitution and statute, has arrived". They also warned of grave consequences of any contemplated military involvement in the situation.

A former communications director for Senator Ted Cruz told reporters that "the new Ted Cruz, post-Trump, is one I don't recognize...his actions directly played into the hands of the mob".

==== Others ====
At least eight sitting Republican senators, (Note: The senators are Roy Blunt, Susan Collins, Joni Ernst, Lisa Murkowski, Rob Portman, Mitt Romney, Ben Sasse and Pat Toomey.) members of the second Bush administration, (Note: Statements were made by George W. Bush, Andrew Card, Dan Coats, Ari Fleischer, Condoleezza Rice, Tom Ridge and Karl Rove.) and former members of the Trump administration condemned Trump's claims of fraud. (Note: The former members included National Security Advisor John Bolton, Director of National Intelligence Michael Chertoff, and H. R. McMaster, Assistant to the President for National Security Affairs (2017–2018).)

House Minority leader Kevin McCarthy initially spoke against Trump's schemes as "doomed to fail" before the attack. During the attack, he implored Trump to intervene. Six days after the attack, he said in a radio interview that he supported a bipartisan commission and grand jury to investigate and that Trump "told me personally that he does have some responsibility". The next day, he stated on the House floor that Trump "bears responsibility for Wednesday's attack on Congress by mob rioters". However, after meeting with Trump at Mar-a-Lago on January 28, 2021, the tone of McCarthy's public comments "changed markedly". McCarthy ultimately opposed the formation of a bipartisan January 6 commission and the House committee.

The New York Post, which had promoted Trump's celebrity in New York since the 1980s and had twice endorsed his presidential candidacy, published a front-page editorial in December asking the president to "stop the insanity" and "end this dark charade", asserting that he was "cheering for an undemocratic coup". The editorial continued: "If you insist on spending your final days in office threatening to burn it all down, that will be how you are remembered. Not as a revolutionary, but as the anarchist holding the match." The Post characterized his former national security advisor Michael Flynn's suggestion to declare martial law as "tantamount to treason".

The Wall Street Journal editorial board on December 20, 2020, wrote "As he leaves office he can't seem to help reminding Americans why they denied him a second term" and "his sore loser routine is beginning to grate even on millions who voted for him".

In 2011, Fox News created a "Monday Mornings with Trump" segment during which Trump would call in to Fox & Friends to offer his views on current affairs, and the hosts of that program continued to be supportive of Trump during his presidency. On January 4, 2021, host Ainsley Earhardt stated that many conservatives "feel like it was rigged", although host Steve Doocy responded: "That's the case that Donald Trump and his lawyers have put out. They said there is all this evidence. But they haven't really produced the evidence." Host Brian Kilmeade stated that he had another "worry" about "the protest the president is calling for on Tuesday and Wednesday [as Congress convened to certify the election results]. I mean, this is the type of anarchy that doesn't work for anybody, Republicans or Democrats, in the big picture."

=== Description as attempted coup ===
==== Before the Capitol attack ====
Multiple media outlets (Note: The outlets are The Atlantic, Bloomberg News, The Economist, The Financial Times, The Guardian, The Intelligencer, The Nation, The New Yorker, The New York Times, Salon, The San Francisco Chronicle, The Washington Post, and Vanity Fair) characterized the efforts as an attempted coup. A number of scholars and pundits preferred to use the more precise term autocoup. Academic debate exists about whether or not to characterize the event as a coup or attempted coup of some sort.

On November 14, Jonathan Powell argued that any illegal or unconstitutional attempts to overturn the results would make it a coup. On December 7, Daniel Drezner argued that violence would be necessary for the coup definition to be met. When news broke about Trump's December 27, 2020, call with Rosen telling the Justice Department to say the election was "corrupt and leave the rest to me", Ari Melber on MSNBC described Trump's activities up through that time as a soft coup. On a January 4, 2021, podcast, Steve Bannon, while discussing the planning for the upcoming events and speech by Trump on January 6 at The Ellipse, said: "Live from our nation's capital, you're in the field headquarters of one of the small divisions of the bloodless coup".

According to a July 2021 book by Washington Post reporters Philip Rucker and Carol Leonnig, during the weeks following the election, Chairman of the Joint Chiefs of Staff Mark Milley became concerned that Trump was preparing to stage a coup, and held informal discussions with his deputies about possible ways to thwart it, telling associates: "They may try, but they're not going to fucking succeed. You can't do this without the military. You can't do this without the CIA and the FBI. We're the guys with the guns." The book also quoted Milley saying: "This is a Reichstag moment. The gospel of the Führer." Milley reportedly told police and military officials preparing to secure Joe Biden's presidential inauguration: "Everyone in this room, whether you're a cop, whether you're a soldier, we're going to stop these guys to make sure we have a peaceful transfer of power. We're going to put a ring of steel around this city and the Nazis aren't getting in." The book also stated that a friend told Milley they were concerned that Trump's allies were attempting to "overturn the government".

==== During or after the Capitol attack ====
Representative Adam Kinzinger (R-IL), as well as New York Attorney General Letitia James described the event as a coup attempt. On March 28, 2022, United States district court Judge David O. Carter ordered Attorney John Eastman to hand over documents to the house select committee. In the court's opinion, Judge Carter wrote that Eastman and Trump's campaign was "a coup in search of a legal theory". Later that day, US Representative Bennie Thompson (D-MS), chairman of House January 6 committee, read the relevant paragraph of Judge Carter's opinion into the committee record. Sen. Mitt Romney (R-UT) described the events as an "insurrection", language also echoed by President-elect Biden.

Professors Inderjeet Parmar, Timothy D. Snyder, and scholars at the Brookings Institution called the event a coup and other academics describe the event as a self-coup. However, there is scholarship on the other side as well; post-January 6 scholarship is split about whether to include that event within the term "coup," some say yes, some say no. News reporting about scholarly opinions reflects that division.

=== "Trump won" and "big lie" ===
Through early October 2026, Trump had attacked the integrity of US elections on more than 70% of the days following his 2025 inauguration, repeatedly making false claims.

"Trump won" is a political slogan adopted by Trump supporters who, contrary to the election results, believe that Trump won the 2020 U.S. presidential election. These claims were described by former US Attorney General William Barr as "bullshit" in sworn deposition testimony, and are called a "big lie" by many, including Senator Mitt Romney.

In the two weeks after the election, a large majority of Trump supporters thought the election was illegitimate. According to a September 2022 poll, 61% of Republicans still believed Biden won in 2020 due to "voter fraud".

As of June 2021, some still believed that Trump would be restored to power by some extraordinary process, possibly later in 2021. These beliefs have led to calls for violence on social media, sparking concerns from the Department of Homeland Security about violence by right-wing extremists in mid-2021. A CNN/SSRS poll conducted in August–September 2021 found that Republicans' enthusiasm for voting in future elections was higher among those believing that "Trump won" and with holding that belief as central to their identity as Republicans.

=== Corporate reactions ===
On January 5, the Chief Executive of the United States Chamber of Commerce commented that "efforts by some members of Congress to disregard certified election results ... undermines our democracy and the rule of law and will only result in further division", while almost 200 business leaders signed a statement from the Partnership for New York City declaring that such a move would "run counter to the essential tenets of our democracy". On January 6, the National Association of Manufacturers called for Vice President Pence to invoke the Twenty-fifth Amendment to the United States Constitution and remove Trump from office.

During the riot, a Cumulus Media executive told its radio hosts that they must stop spreading the idea of election fraud. The memo said the election was over and that "there are no alternate acceptable 'paths'", and thus the radio hosts must immediately "help induce national calm".

Many large corporations pledged to suspend donations to officials and candidates who opposed the certification of Biden's victory, hindered the peaceful transfer of power, or incited violence. While many companies did so, most had resumed such contributions within a year, either directly or through their lobbyists.

== See also ==
- Electoral fraud in the United States
- Election denial movement in the United States
- Post-election lawsuits related to the 2020 U.S. presidential election
- 2022 Brazilian general election - election in which the defeated President Jair Bolsonaro denied the results
- 2016 Philippine Vice Presidential election - election in which the defeated candidate Bongbong Marcos protested the results
