= Inderjeet Parmar =

International studies professor

Academic work
- Discipline: International politics
- Institutions: University of Manchester; City, University of London

Inderjeet Parmar is a professor of international politics, and head of the Department of International Politics at City, University of London and an Honorary Research Fellow (Politics) at the University of Manchester. He is past president of British International Studies Association and Vice Chairman of the British International Studies Association, where he formerly served as Treasurer. He has been described as "an obligatory reference point on the history of social science, international relations and US foreign policy."

His current book project is entitled Presidents and Prime Ministers at War: Race, elitism and empire in Anglo-American wars from Korea to the wars on terror.

Parmar is a member of the steering committee of The Trump Project at UC, Dublin.

Parmar is a regular commentator on American politics and foreign policy on CNN, BBC, RT, TRT, and TalkRadio. He is a columnist at The Wire.

== Reception ==
When Foundations of the American Century was published in 2012, it was reviewed by Walter Russell Mead for the foreign policy journal Foreign Affairs, the flagship publication of the Council on Foreign Relations. Although Mead points out a few of his reservations, the review is generally positive.

== Publications ==
External videos
- Foundations, Philantrocapitalism, and the Threats to Democracy (BITS Symposium, December 2016)

Books

- Think Tanks and Power in Foreign Policy: A Comparative Study of the Role and Influence of the Council on Foreign Relations and the Royal Institute of International Affairs, 1939-1945. Palgrave Macmillan (2004). ISBN 978-1403921031. doi:10.1057/9780230000780.
- New Directions in U.S. Foreign Policy. Routledge Studies in U.S. Foreign Policy (2009). ISBN 978-0415777483.
- Soft Power and U.S. Foreign Policy Theoretical, Historical and Contemporary Perspectives. Routledge Studies in U.S. Foreign Policy (2010).
- Barack Obama and the Myth of a Post-Racial America, edited with Mark Ledwidge. Routledge Series on Identity Politics (2013)
- Foundations of the American Century: The Ford, Carnegie, and Rockefeller Foundations in the Rise of American Power. Columbia University Press (2015).

Book contributions

- "How Elite Networks Shape the Contours of the Discipline and What We Might Do About It" (Chapter 8). In: What's the Point of International Relations? New York: Routledge (2017). ISBN 978-1315201467.

Articles

- "American Power and Identities in the Age of Obama." International Politics, vol. 48, no. 2 (March 2011). doi:10.1057/ip.2011.10.
- "Not So Cuddly." Berfrois (April 4, 2012). Archived from the original.
- "The Legitimacy Crisis of the U.S. Elite and the Rise of Donald Trump." Insight Turkey, vol. 19, no. 3 (2017), pp. 9–22. JSTOR 26300527.
- "Black Lives Matter must avoid being co-opted by American corporate philanthropy." PMP Magazine (July 20, 2020). Archived from the original.
