= Green Bay Sweep (politics) =

Plot to reverse the 2020 U.S. presidential election's loss of Donald Trump

The Green Bay Sweep is the name of a procedural strategy to attempt to overturn the 2020 United States presidential election advocated by Peter Navarro. In the political iteration, devised by Steve Bannon, the Electoral College vote count would be blocked by repeated challenges to various state's vote counts by Republican members of the House and Senate favorable to Donald Trump. Each challenge could take up to two hours of debate by each chamber, individually, leading to as much of 24 hours of televised hearings. According to the plan, public pressure created by the delay would lead state legislatures in six key battleground states with Republican-dominated legislatures – Arizona, Michigan, Pennsylvania, Georgia, Wisconsin, Nevada – to de-certify election results, with the intended outcome that Trump would have more certified electoral college votes than the election's actual winner, Joe Biden.

== Implementation ==
Trump supported the strategy, but Pence rejected it, and the plan was dependent on Pence's participation. It was difficult to pressure Pence, said Navarro, because all communication passed through his chief of staff, Marc Short, who had been president of the Koch Brothers-funded Freedom Partners.

It was like the Soviet Union taking over Eastern Europe. As an Iron Koch Curtain fell over the vice president, the only way you could speak to VPOTUS was to go through Short.

— Peter Navarro

Republican legislators initially followed the plan. Recalling January 6, 2021, Navarro said that "Sen. Ted Cruz and [Arizona Rep.] Paul Gosar started the Green Bay Sweep" at 1 p.m. by challenging Arizona's election results and that over a hundred Republicans in the House and Senate were available to participate. He told this to MSNBC host Ari Melber in a January 4, 2022 interview.

After proceedings were interrupted by the January 6 Capitol attack, Pence cited the violence as a rationale for blocking further challenges.

== Navarro book and aftermath ==
Navarro outlined the plot in a book published in November 2021 and spoke about it in multiple media interviews. It took its name from the Packers sweep, where the Green Bay Packers of the 1950s and '60s, led by Vince Lombardi, would flood a zone with blockers, allowing the football to be advanced dependably behind them. The Green Bay Sweep was intended to implement a strategy laid out by the Eastman memos for the purpose of overturning election results such that Donald J. Trump would be designated as president for a second term.

Though Navarro spoke to MSNBC host Ari Melber on January 4, 2022, several weeks after his book was released, he defied a February 2022 subpoena from the House select committee investigating the January 6 attack, citing executive privilege. The full House sent a criminal referral to the Justice Department for contempt of Congress. Navarro was arrested, indicted on two counts of contempt, and convicted of both counts on September 8, 2023.
