= List of The New York Times number-one books of 2021 =

The American daily newspaper The New York Times publishes multiple weekly lists ranking the best-selling books in the United States. The lists are split into three genres—fiction, nonfiction and children's books. Both the fiction and nonfiction lists are further split into multiple lists.

== Fiction ==
The following list ranks the number-one best-selling fiction books, in the combined print and e-books category.

The most frequent weekly best seller of the year was The Four Winds by Kristin Hannah with 5 weeks at the top of the list, followed closely by The Duke and I by Julia Quinn with 4 weeks.

Date	Book	Author	Publisher	Ref.
January 3	A Time for Mercy	John Grisham	Doubleday	
January 10	A Time for Mercy	John Grisham	Doubleday	
January 17	The Duke and I	Julia Quinn	Avon	
January 24	The Duke and I	Julia Quinn	Avon	
January 31	The Duke and I	Julia Quinn	Avon	
February 7	The Duke and I	Julia Quinn	Avon	
February 14	The Russian	James Patterson and James O. Born	Little, Brown and Company	
February 21	The Four Winds	Kristin Hannah	St. Martin's Press	
February 28	The Four Winds	Kristin Hannah	St. Martin's Press	
March 7	A Court of Silver Flames	Sarah J. Maas	Bloomsbury Publishing	
March 14	The Four Winds	Kristin Hannah	St. Martin's Press	
March 21	Life After Death	Sister Souljah	Emily Bestler Books	
March 28	The Four Winds	Kristin Hannah	St. Martin's Press	
April 4	Win	Harlan Coben	Grand Central Publishing	
April 11	The Four Winds	Kristin Hannah	St. Martin's Press	
April 18	The Hill We Climb	Amanda Gorman	Viking Books	
April 25	The Hill We Climb	Amanda Gorman	Viking Books	
May 2	Ocean Prey	John Sandford	G. P. Putnam's Sons	
May 9	A Gambling Man	David Baldacci	Grand Central Publishing	
May 16	Sooley	John Grisham	Doubleday	
May 23	21st Birthday	James Patterson and Maxine Paetro	Little, Brown and Company	
May 30	While Justice Sleeps	Stacey Abrams	Doubleday	
June 6	The Last Thing He Told Me	Laura Dave	Simon & Schuster	
June 13	Legacy	Nora Roberts	St. Martin's Press	
June 20	Freed	E. L. James	Bloom Books	
June 27	The President's Daughter	Bill Clinton and James Patterson	Little, Brown and Company	
July 4	The President's Daughter	Bill Clinton and James Patterson	Little, Brown and Company	
July 11	The Last Thing He Told Me	Laura Dave	Simon & Schuster	
July 18	Once Upon a Time in Hollywood	Quentin Tarantino	Harper Perennial	
July 25	The Paper Palace	Miranda Cowley Heller	Riverhead Books	
August 1	The Cellist	Daniel Silva	HarperCollins	
August 8	Black Ice	Brad Thor	Emily Bestler Books	
August 15	The Last Thing He Told Me	Laura Dave	Simon & Schuster	
August 22	Billy Summers	Stephen King	Scribner	
August 29	Billy Summers	Stephen King	Scribner	
September 5	Bloodless	Douglas Preston and Lincoln Child	Grand Central Publishing	
September 12	The Madness of Crowds	Louise Penny	Minotaur Books	
September 19	A Slow Fire Burning	Paula Hawkins	Riverhead Books	
September 26	Forgotten in Death	J. D. Robb	St. Martin's Press	
October 3	Apples Never Fall	Liane Moriarty	Henry Holt and Company	
October 10	Apples Never Fall	Liane Moriarty	Henry Holt and Company	
October 17	The Wish	Nicholas Sparks	Grand Central Publishing	
October 24	The Lincoln Highway	Amor Towles	Viking Books	
October 31	State of Terror	Hillary Rodham Clinton and Louise Penny	Simon & Schuster and St. Martin's Press	
November 7	The Judge's List	John Grisham	Doubleday	
November 14	Better Off Dead	Lee Child and Andrew Child	Delacorte Press	
November 21	Game On	Janet Evanovich	Atria Books	
November 28	The Dark Hours	Michael Connelly	Little, Brown and Company	
December 5	Mercy	David Baldacci	Grand Central Publishing	
December 12	Go Tell the Bees That I Am Gone	Diana Gabaldon	Delacorte Press	
December 19	Wish You Were Here	Jodi Picoult	Ballantine Books	
December 26	Call Us What We Carry	Amanda Gorman	Viking Books	

== Nonfiction ==
The following list ranks the number-one best-selling nonfiction books, in the combined print and e-books category.

The most frequent weekly best seller of the year was American Marxism by Mark Levin with 8 weeks at the top of the list, followed by A Promised Land by Barack Obama with 6 weeks at the top of the list.

Issue date	Title	Author(s)	Publisher	Ref.
January 3	A Promised Land	Barack Obama	Crown	
January 10	A Promised Land	Barack Obama	Crown	
January 17	A Promised Land	Barack Obama	Crown	
January 24	A Promised Land	Barack Obama	Crown	
January 31	A Promised Land	Barack Obama	Crown	
February 7	A Promised Land	Barack Obama	Crown	
February 14	Just as I Am	Cicely Tyson	HarperCollins	
February 21	Think Again	Adam Grant	Viking Press	
February 28	Walk in My Combat Boots	James Patterson and Matt Eversmann with Chris Mooney	Little, Brown and Company	
March 7	How to Avoid a Climate Disaster	Bill Gates	Knopf	
March 14	How to Avoid a Climate Disaster	Bill Gates	Knopf	
March 21	How to Avoid a Climate Disaster	Bill Gates	Knopf	
March 28	The Code Breaker	Walter Isaacson	Simon & Schuster	
April 4	This Is the Fire	Don Lemon	Little, Brown and Company	
April 11	The Code Breaker	Walter Isaacson	Simon & Schuster	
April 18	The Code Breaker	Walter Isaacson	Simon & Schuster	
April 25	Broken Horses	Brandi Carlile	Crown	
May 2	On the House	John Boehner	St. Martin's Press	
May 9	Out of Many, One	George W. Bush	Crown	
May 16	What Happened to You?	Bruce D. Perry and Oprah Winfrey	Flatiron Books	
May 23	Killing the Mob	Bill O'Reilly and Martin Dugard	St. Martin's Press	
May 30	Killing the Mob	Bill O'Reilly and Martin Dugard	St. Martin's Press	
June 6	The Anthropocene Reviewed	John Green	Dutton	
June 13	Killing the Mob	Bill O'Reilly and Martin Dugard	St. Martin's Press	
June 20	How the Word Is Passed	Clint Smith	Little, Brown and Company	
June 27	Killing the Mob	Bill O'Reilly and Martin Dugard	St. Martin's Press	
July 4	Killing the Mob	Bill O'Reilly and Martin Dugard	St. Martin's Press	
July 11	The Body Keeps the Score	Bessel van der Kolk	Penguin Books	
July 18	Nightmare Scenario	Yasmina Abutaleb and Damian Paletta	Harper	
July 25	How I Saved the World	Jesse Watters	Broadside Books	
August 1	American Marxism	Mark Levin	Threshold Editions	
August 8	I Alone Can Fix It	Carol Leonnig and Philip Rucker	Penguin Press	
August 15	American Marxism	Mark Levin	Threshold Editions	
August 22	American Marxism	Mark Levin	Threshold Editions	
August 29	American Marxism	Mark Levin	Threshold Editions	
September 5	American Marxism	Mark Levin	Threshold Editions	
September 12	American Marxism	Mark Levin	Threshold Editions	
September 19	The Afghanistan Papers	Craig Whitlock	Simon & Schuster	
September 26	American Marxism	Mark Levin	Threshold Editions	
October 3	American Marxism	Mark Levin	Threshold Editions	
October 10	Peril	Bob Woodward and Robert Costa	Simon & Schuster	
October 17	Peril	Bob Woodward and Robert Costa	Simon & Schuster	
October 24	The Storyteller	Dave Grohl	Dey Street Books	
October 31	Midnight in Washington	Adam Schiff	Random House	
November 7	Not All Diamonds and Rosé	Dave Quinn	Andy Cohen	
November 14	Going There	Katie Couric	Little, Brown and Company	
November 21	The Lyrics: 1956 to the Present	Paul McCartney	Liveright	
November 28	Will	Will Smith with Mark Manson	Penguin Press	
December 5	The 1619 Project	Nikole Hannah-Jones and The New York Times Magazine	One World	
December 12	The 1619 Project	Nikole Hannah-Jones and The New York Times Magazine	One World	
December 19	The 1619 Project	Nikole Hannah-Jones and The New York Times Magazine	One World	
December 26	The 1619 Project	Nikole Hannah-Jones and The New York Times Magazine	One World	

== See also ==
- Publishers Weekly list of bestselling novels in the United States in the 2020s
