= The Anthropocene Reviewed =

Podcast and 2021 book by John Green

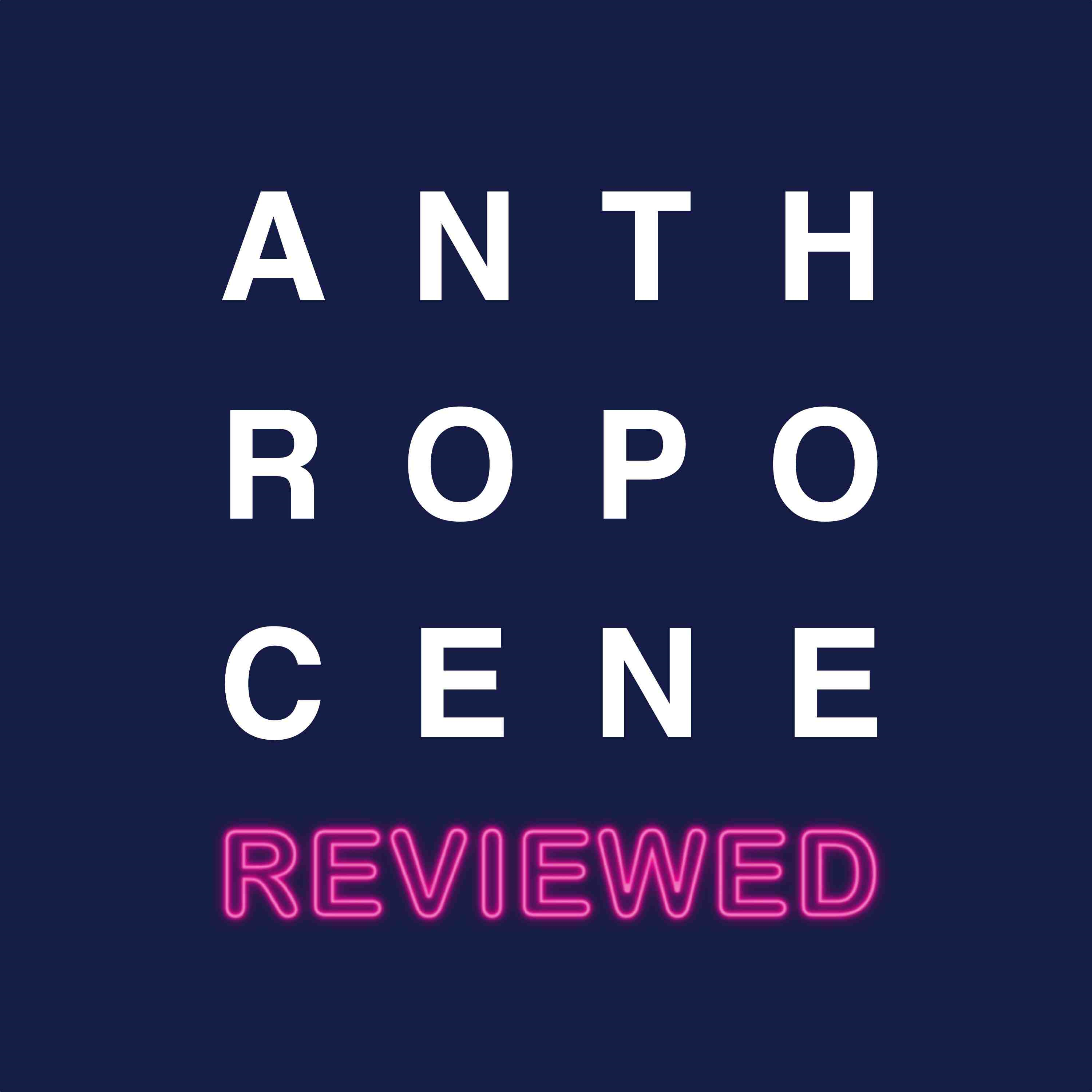
- Genre: Commentary
- Language: English

Creative team
- Created by: John Green

Cast and voices
- Hosted by: John Green

Music
- Composed by: Hannis Brown

Production
- Production: Rosianna Halse Rojas; Stan Muller

Technical specifications
- Audio format: MP3

Publication
- No. of episodes: 36
- Original release: January 29, 2018 – August 26, 2021
- Provider: Complexly; WNYC Studios (episodes 1–32)
- Updates: Monthly

The Anthropocene Reviewed is the shared name of a podcast and 2021 nonfiction book by John Green. The podcast started in January 2018, with each episode featuring Green reviewing "different facets of the human-centered planet on a five-star scale". The name comes from the Anthropocene, the proposed geological epoch that includes significant human impact on the environment. Episodes typically contain Green reviewing two topics, accompanied by stories on how they have affected his life. These topics included intangible concepts like humanity's capacity for wonder; artificial products like Diet Dr. Pepper; natural species, such as the Canada goose, whose fates have been altered by human influence; and phenomena that primarily influence humanity, such as Halley's Comet.

The podcast was released monthly until September 2020, when Green announced he was putting it on hiatus as he adapted it into a book. The Anthropocene Reviewed: Essays on a Human-Centered Planet, was published by Dutton Penguin on May 18, 2021, featuring revised essays from the podcast and several new essays. The book received positive reviews and debuted at number one on The New York Times Best Seller list. After the release of a four-episode season accompanying the book's publication, Green announced he had no plans to release any more episodes.

== Podcast ==
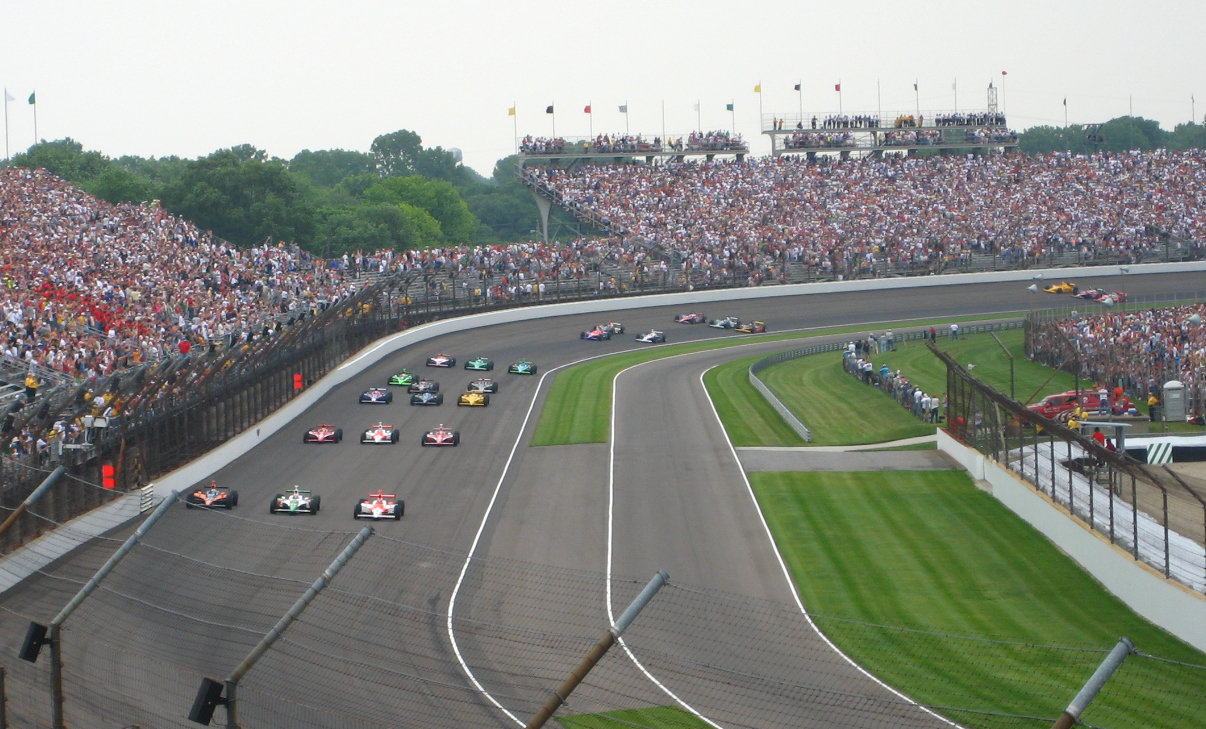
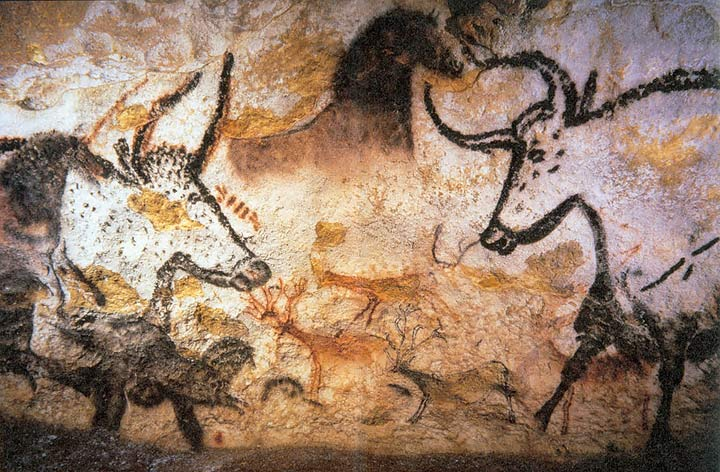
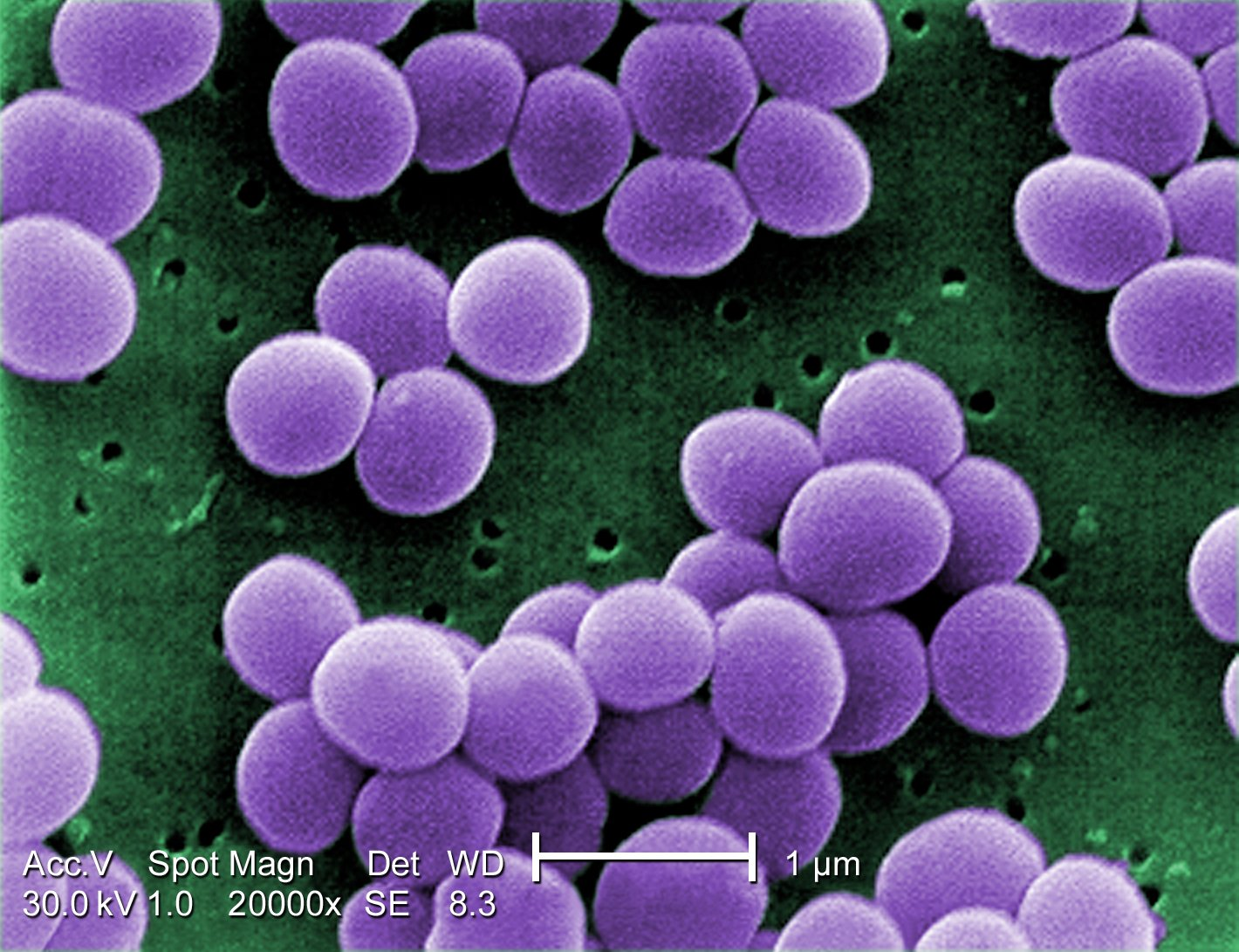
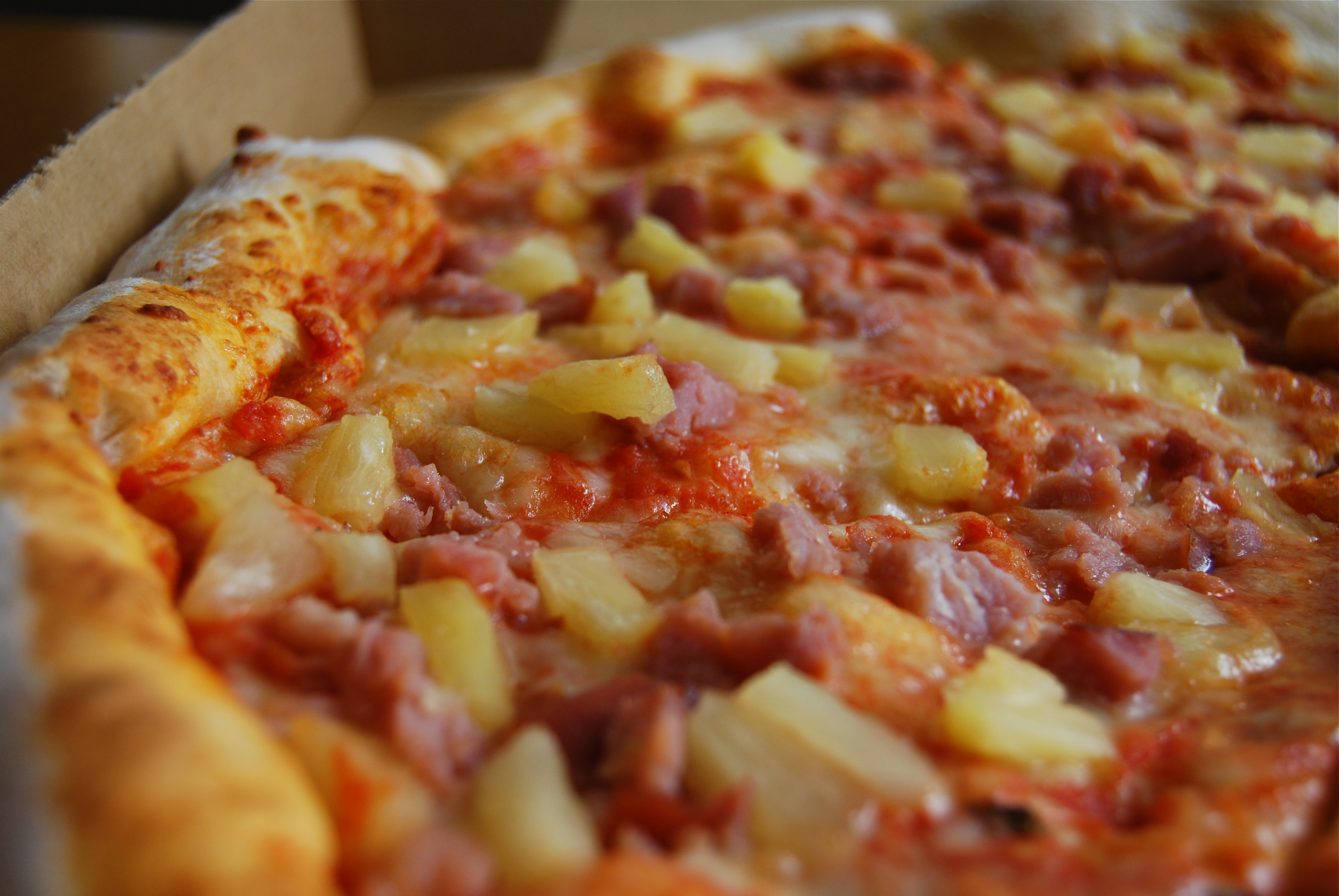
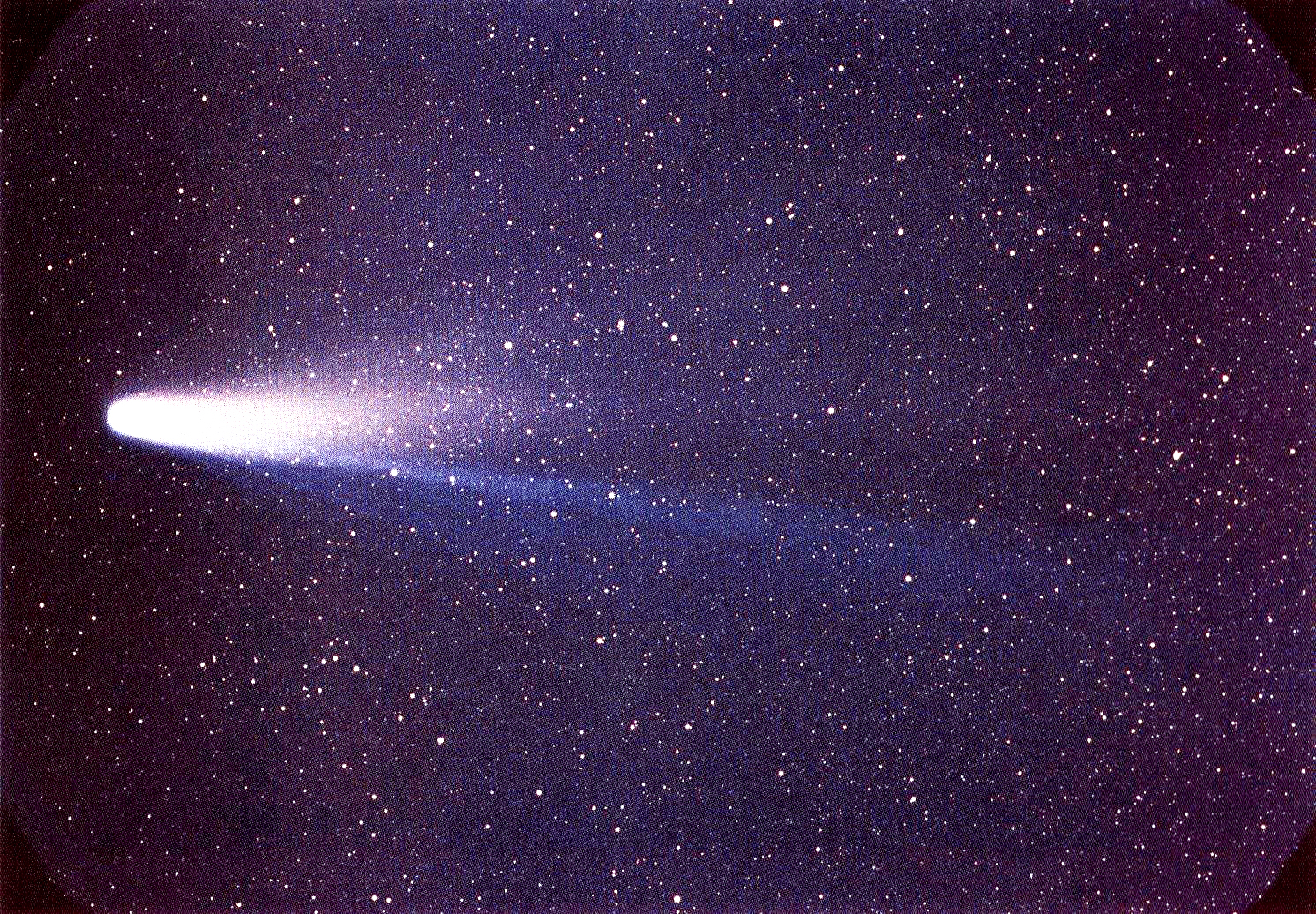
Subjects of reviews. Left to right, top to bottom: John Green's signature, the Indianapolis 500, Lascaux paintings, Staphylococcus aureus, Hawaiian pizza, Halley's Comet.

Each podcast typically covers two topics, which have included celestial phenomena, works of art, diseases, and human emotions. The subjects serve as starting points for explorations of Green's own life and perspectives in the form of memoir-like essays, which have been described as "thought-provoking reviews [that] use a blend of poetry, historical detail and humor."

=== Background ===
The premise for the podcast was born from a number of sources. Green worked for the book review journal Booklist in the early 2000s, where he reviewed hundreds of books over five years, sparking his interest in reviews as a literary format.

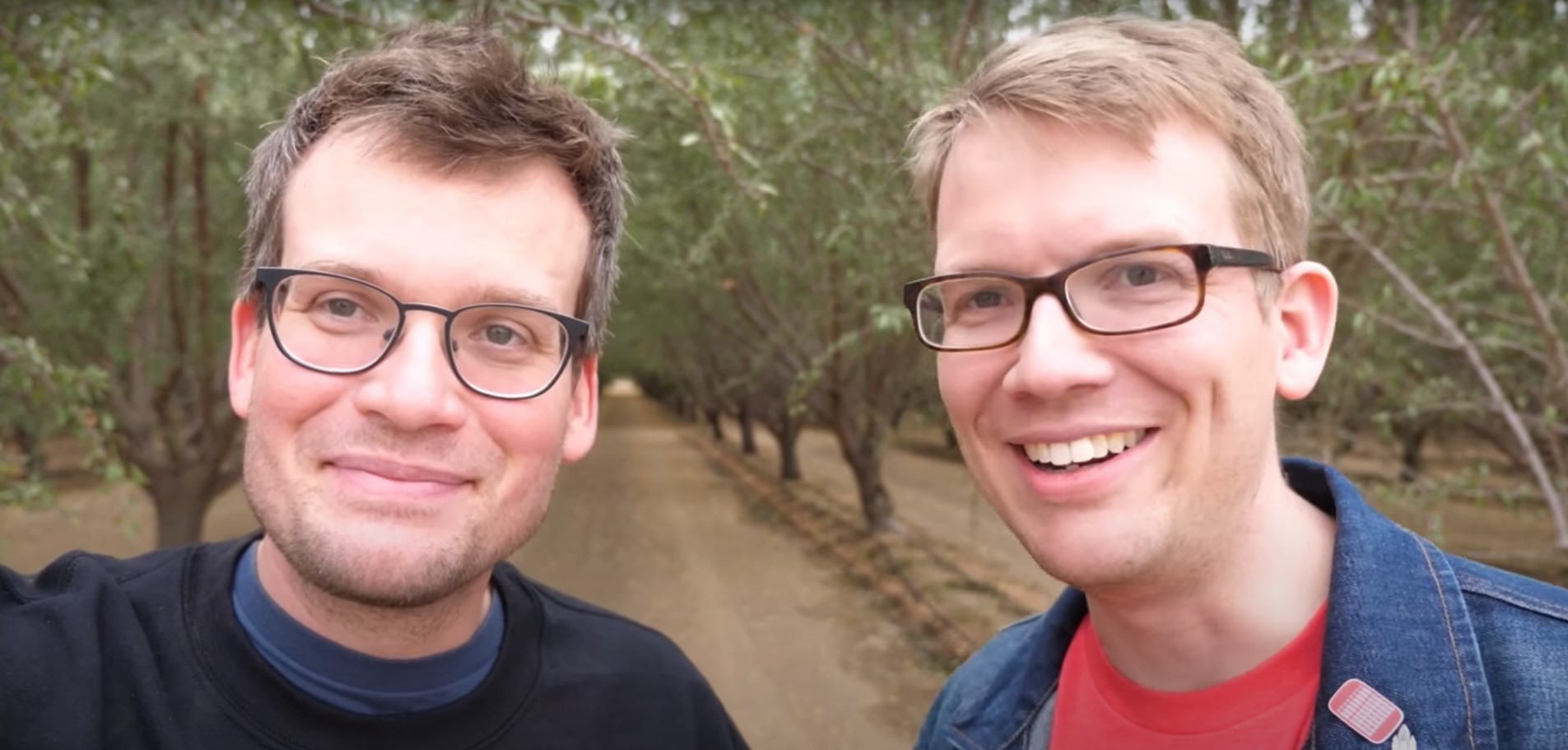
John (left) and Hank Green (right) during their 2017 book tour

In October 2017, after the release of Green's novel Turtles All the Way Down, he and his brother Hank Green went on a book tour. As they traveled the country, they passed time by finding Google user reviews for the places they were passing that they considered absurd, such as a one-star review for Badlands National Park. While reflecting on the increased prevalence of reviews and the five-star scale in modern life, John told Hank he had once had an idea to write a review of Canada geese, to which Hank responded, "The Anthropocene... reviewed!"

A few months later, John shared some reviews he had written in 2014 on Canada geese and Diet Dr Pepper with his wife, Sarah Urist Green. After noting that John wrote the reviews in a nonfiction form of third-person omniscient narration, Sarah pointed out that reviews often act as a form of memoir, saying, "in the Anthropocene, there are no disinterested observers; there are only participants." John cited this as a major reason he chose to put more of himself into the reviews.

In the introduction to The Anthropocene Reviewed book, Green also revealed that he had begun to have trouble writing fiction because of the ways readers were conflating his protagonists' views with his own. Green specifically referenced a 2017 Allegra Goodman quote; Goodman was asked who she would like to have write her life story, to which she responded, "I seem to be writing it myself, but since I'm a novelist, it's all in code." In a 2021 interview with The New York Times, Green elaborated, saying, "I didn't want to write in code anymore. I wanted to try to write as myself because I've never done that in any formal way."

=== Post-debut ===
The podcast's first episode was published on January 29, 2018. In a November 2018 interview with Vulture, Green said, "The Anthropocene Reviewed is an opportunity for me to get back to my roots. With the podcast, I want to pay careful and sustained attention to the world around me, and that's something I often feel like I don't do, especially when I'm on the internet."

In June 2019, Roman Mars interviewed Green about his show in an episode of 99% Invisible that also featured the reviews from episodes six and nine. The Lascaux Paintings essay from episode six was also adapted into an animated visualization by the German YouTube channel Kurzgesagt in May 2020.

In August 2019, John and Hank performed live versions of their podcasts on stage, with John presenting a new episode of The Anthropocene Reviewed, as well as a live episode of their shared podcast Dear Hank & John. The live performances returned in March 2020 with a planned three-city tour including stops in Columbus, Ohio and Carmel, Indiana, with a third performance set for Ann Arbor, Michigan that was canceled due to the onset of the COVID-19 pandemic.

On the August 2020 episode "The Anthropocene Reviewed, Reviewed", Green announced he would be taking a hiatus from the podcast after the next episode in part to work on a book adaptation of the podcast. In April 2021, the podcast returned for a four-episode season coinciding with the book's release. The fourth episode was released on August 26, 2021, with Green commenting the day before in a video posted to his Vlogbrothers YouTube channel that he believed the episode would be his last: "Working on The Anthropocene Reviewed has been an incredible experience, but I think I'm ready to go back to writing fiction—maybe?"

== Book ==
The Anthropocene Reviewed: Essays on a Human-Centered Planet
- Author: John Green
- Cover artist: Grace Han
- Language: English
- Subject: Essay, Memoir
- Publisher: Dutton Penguin
- Publication date: May 18, 2021
- Media type: Print (hardcover), audiobook
- Pages: 304
- ISBN: 978-0525555216

The Anthropocene Reviewed: Essays on a Human-Centered Planet was published by Dutton Penguin on May 18, 2021, Green's first nonfiction book and sixth solo publication. The book features revised versions of many of the essays from the podcast, as well as new original essays, ordered chronologically through Green's life to give the book the approximate structure of a memoir. Green wrote about living through the COVID-19 pandemic in many of the essays as well as his mental health struggles. He also narrated the audiobook, which was released simultaneously with the hardcover and contains three additional audiobook-exclusive essays. In addition to the English version, translated versions were released in German, Spanish, Portuguese, Italian, and Dutch.

As he did with many of his previous books, Green signed all 250,000 tip-in sheets of the first printing for the United States and Canada. He wrote a review of the experience on the final signed page. This review was later revised and expanded on for an episode of the podcast released on the same day as the book. Green hosted a virtual book tour, with guests Clint Smith, Latif Nasser, Sarah Urist Green, Hank Green, and Ashley C. Ford making appearances at the various shows.

In November 2021, Green announced an accompanying zine sold through the Green brothers' e-commerce store DFTBA.com. The zine is 20 pages long and contains reviews by Green and Stan Muller, a poem by Rosianna Halse Rojas, and illustrations by Nadim Silverman.

In April 2022, the book was chosen to be the 2022 common read at the University of Mississippi. Green gave a keynote address at the university's annual fall convocation.

The paperback edition was released on March 21, 2023, with the inclusion of two additional essays. Green hosted an event at Miami Dade College on March 23 for the launch of the book.

=== Reception ===
The book received positive reviews and sold well, with more than 57,000 copies purchased during its first week. It debuted as a number one New York Times Best Seller in the Combined Print & E-books Nonfiction and Hardcover Nonfiction categories, staying on the latter list for nine weeks. It was subsequently listed at number six on the American Booksellers Association's Year-End 2021 Bestseller List in the category of hardcover nonfiction. Booklist, Library Journal, Publishers Weekly, and Shelf Awareness all gave starred reviews, with the last stating that "each of the 44 entries [...] is a small gem, polished to near perfection." For NPR, Adam Frank wrote that each essay "is a web of salient and unexpected connections." Elizabeth Greenwood from The San Francisco Chronicle wrote, "The Anthropocene Reviewed is the perfect book to read over lunch or to keep on your nightstand, whenever you need a reminder of what it is to feel small and human, in the best possible way." Scott Neumyer of Shondaland wrote, "Green may have made his name by writing fiction (and for good reason), but this first foray into nonfiction is his most mature, compelling, and beautifully written book yet."

In November 2021, the book was named to the longlist for the 2022 Andrew Carnegie Medals for Excellence in Fiction and Nonfiction. The book also won the 2021 Goodreads Choice Award in the category of Best Nonfiction.

== Reviews ==
Auld Lang Syne – The Anthropocene Reviewed
The 23rd episode of the podcast, reviewing "Auld Lang Syne"

=== Podcast episodes ===
Ratings are presented in the order that topics are listed in the title, regardless of order presented within the episode.

No.	Title	Rating(s)		Duration	Release date	Ref.
1	"Canada Geese and Diet Dr Pepper"	3/5 stars	4.5/5 stars	16:44	January 29, 2018	
2	"Halley's Comet and Cholera"	5/5 stars	1/5 stars	18:36	February 21, 2018	
3	"Googling Strangers and Kentucky Bluegrass"	2.5/5 stars	2/5 stars	18:42	March 28, 2018	
4	"Super Mario Kart and Bonneville Salt Flats"	4/5 stars	3/5 stars	17:46	April 26, 2018	
5	"Hawaiian Pizza and Viral Meningitis"	2/5 stars	1/5 stars	20:34	May 31, 2018	
6	"Lascaux Paintings and Taco Bell Breakfast Menu"	4.5/5 stars	2/5 stars	17:50	July 18, 2018	
7	"The Yips and CNN"	1.5/5 stars	2/5 stars	20:12	August 30, 2018	
8	"Whispering and the Weather"	3.5/5 stars	4/5 stars	19:16	September 27, 2018	
9	"Pennies and Piggly Wiggly"	1.5/5 stars	3/5 stars	21:28	October 25, 2018	
10	"Tetris and the Seed Potatoes of Leningrad"	4.5/5 stars	4.5/5 stars	22:46	November 15, 2018	
11	"Teddy Bears and Penalty Shootouts"	2.5/5 stars	4/5 stars	24:47	December 27, 2018	
12	"Indianapolis and Love at First Sight"	4/5 stars	4/5 stars	22:05	January 31, 2019	
13	"Velociraptors and Harvey"	2.5/5 stars	4.5/5 stars	20:26	February 28, 2019	
14	"The Hall of Presidents and New Partner"	3/5 stars	4/5 stars	21:22	March 28, 2019	
15	"Prom and Stanford Marshmallow Experiment"	3/5 stars	3/5 stars	19:22	April 25, 2019	
-	"Jogging and Playing Bullshit with Nat Wolff"	3.5/5 stars	4/5 stars	18:29	May 17, 2019 (Project for Awesome exclusive)	
16	"Scratch 'n' Sniff Stickers and the Indianapolis 500"	3.5/5 stars	4/5 stars	22:41	May 30, 2019	
17	"Gray Aliens and Rock Paper Scissors"	2/5 stars	4/5 stars	22:16	June 27, 2019	
18	"Air Conditioning and Sycamore Trees"	3.5/5 stars	4.5/5 stars	23:40	July 25, 2019	
19	"Hot Dog Eating Contest and Chemotherapy"	3/5 stars	4.5/5 stars	25:09	August 29, 2019	
20	"QWERTY Keyboard and the Kauaʻi ʻōʻō"	4/5 stars	4.5/5 stars	23:20	September 26, 2019	
21	"Capacity for Wonder and Sunsets"	4/5 stars	5/5 stars	23:48	October 31, 2019	
22	"Notes App and Sports Rivalries"	3.5/5 stars	2/5 stars	22:58	November 27, 2019	
23	"Auld Lang Syne"	5/5 stars		24:07	December 26, 2019	
24	"Works of Art by Agnes Martin and Hiroyuki Doi"	4.5/5 stars	4/5 stars	22:43	January 30, 2020	
25	"Staphylococcus Aureus and the Non-Denial Denial"	1.5/5 stars	2/5 stars	23:48	February 24, 2020	
26	"Humanity's Temporal Range"	5/5 stars		22:58	March 26, 2020	
27	"Monopoly and Academic Decathlon"	2/5 stars	4.5/5 stars	24:14	April 30, 2020	
28	"You'll Never Walk Alone and Jerzy Dudek"	4.5/5 stars	5/5 stars	27:29	May 28, 2020	
29	"Seventeen Listener Suggestions, Reviewed"	List: Tweenness; The Mountain Goats; Automatic doors; Potstickers; Stock pickers; Spoonerisms; Dazzle camouflage; Pandemics; Headphones; Times New Roman; Signing emails with initials; Iron; Bath bombs; Memes; Beer helmets; Sporks; The Moon		22:43	June 25, 2020	
30	"Mortification and Civilization"	1.5/5 stars	2.5/5 stars	27:35	July 30, 2020	
31	"The Anthropocene Reviewed, Reviewed"	(podcast)	(experience)	24:42	August 27, 2020	
32	"Plague"	1/5 stars		26:12	September 24, 2020	
33	"Penguins of Madagascar and the Smallpox Vaccine"	4.5/5 stars	5/5 stars	28:05	April 29, 2021	
34	"Icelandic Hot Dog Stand and Signing Your Name 250,000 Times"	5/5 stars	4/5 stars	25:39	May 18, 2021	
35	"Ginkgo Biloba"	5/5 stars		28:21	June 30, 2021	
36	"Orbital Sunrise"	5/5 stars		24:05	August 26, 2021	
-	"Galápagos Islands and Galápagos"	5/5 stars	2.5/5 stars	17:41	March 14, 2026 (Project for Awesome exclusive)	

=== Text-based reviews ===
Reviews in The Anthropocene Reviewed book originally from the podcast are excluded from the table below.

Subject	Rating	Source	Release date	Ref.
Coffee mugs	4.5/5 stars	Coffee mug sold as a DFTBA.com exclusive	February 27, 2020	
Signing your name 250,000 times	4/5 stars	Hand-written on the tip-in sheet of a single copy of The Anthropocene Reviewed book	March 30, 2021	
The Internet	3/5 stars	First published in the main text of The Anthropocene Reviewed book	May 18, 2021	
Wintry mix	4/5 stars	First published in the main text of The Anthropocene Reviewed book	May 18, 2021	
The World's Largest Ball of Paint	4/5 stars	First published in the main text of The Anthropocene Reviewed book	May 18, 2021	
Three Farmers on Their Way to a Dance (Note: This essay is adapted from an episode of The Art Assignment released on February 28, 2019, where no starred review was given.)	4.5/5 stars	First published in the main text of The Anthropocene Reviewed book	May 18, 2021	
Autographs	3.5/5 stars	Page opposite the autographed tip-in sheet of The Anthropocene Reviewed book	May 18, 2021	
Bembo MT Pro	4.5/5 stars	Copyright page of The Anthropocene Reviewed book	May 18, 2021	
Half-title pages	2.5/5 stars	Half-title page of The Anthropocene Reviewed book	May 18, 2021	
Back page book ads	3/5 stars	Back page of The Anthropocene Reviewed book	May 18, 2021	
Zines	4.5/5 stars	First published in The Anthropocene Reviewed zine	November 12, 2021	
Sperm banks (Note: This was a guest essay by Green's longtime production partner Stan Muller.)	3/5 stars	First published in The Anthropocene Reviewed zine	November 12, 2021	
