= Proposed "Liberty" Amendment to the United States Constitution =

The proposed "Liberty" Amendment to the United States Constitution was first proffered, pursuant to the Constitution's Article V, for the consideration of the 82nd United States Congress on June 28, 1952, in the form of House Joint Resolution No. 491 ("proposing an amendment to the Constitution of the United States relative to calling of a convention to consider an amendment to the Constitution to prohibit the United States Government from engaging in business in competition with its citizens") by the late United States Representative Ralph W. Gwinn of New York (98 Congressional Record 8542).

Most recently, it was presented for the consideration of the 112th Congress on March 15, 2011, in the form of House Joint Resolution No. 50 ("proposing an amendment to the Constitution of the United States relative to abolishing personal income, estate, and gift taxes and prohibiting the United States Government from engaging in business in competition with its citizens") by then-United States Representative Ron Paul of Texas (157 Congressional Record 3989). Paul offered detailed explanatory remarks about the proposed constitutional amendment which were printed in the Congressional Record of that same date (157 Congressional Record 4099).

As presented by Paul, the text of the proposed constitutional amendment reads as follows:

Section 1. The Government of the United States shall not engage in any business, professional, commercial, financial, or industrial enterprise except as specified in the Constitution.

Section 2. The constitution or laws of any State, or the laws of the United States, shall not be subject to the terms of any foreign or domestic agreement which would abrogate this amendment.

Section 3. The activities of the United States Government which violate the intent and purposes of this amendment shall, within a period of three years from the date of the ratification of this amendment, be liquidated and the properties and facilities affected shall be sold.

Section 4. Three years after the ratification of this amendment the sixteenth article of amendments to the Constitution of the United States shall stand repealed and thereafter Congress shall not levy taxes on personal incomes, estates, and gifts.

As of June 2025, the proposal has not commanded the approval of both houses of Congress in order to submit it for the consideration of the states for ratification, as the aforementioned Article V provides. Nor have the legislatures of a sufficient number of states applied to Congress for the calling of an "Article V Convention" on the topic.

== Purpose ==
United States Representative Larry McDonald of Georgia expounded upon the need for such an amendment on October 9, 1975, advocating for the bill in Congressional debate. According to McDonald, the purpose of the "Liberty" Amendment is to guard against the Federal government engaging in commercial enterprises in competition with American citizens unless such activities are specifically authorized by the Constitution, such as package delivery by the U.S. Postal Service (whose Constitutional situs is found in Article I, Section 8, Clause 7 thereof).

Supporters of this proposed amendment believe that the U.S. Federal Government should liquidate approximately 900 agencies and business-like activities, using the proceeds to then reduce the federal debt. They further believe that the government could then operate on a substantially reduced budget and, in turn, reduce various taxes.

== Support of the "Liberty" Amendment within the state legislatures ==
Nine states have endorsed the Liberty Amendment through some type of action: Wyoming (1959), Louisiana (1960), Nevada (1960), Texas (1960), Georgia (1962), South Carolina (1962), Arizona (1979), Indiana (1982) and Mississippi (1982)

=== Asking Congress alone to propose the "Liberty" Amendment with no desire expressed for an "Article V Convention" ===
- Nevada – In 1960, the Nevada Legislature adopted Senate Joint Resolution No. 7 in support of Congress proposing the "Liberty" Amendment for ratification (106 Congressional Record 10749); and
- Arizona – In 1979, the Arizona Legislature adopted House Joint Memorial No. 2001 likewise in support (125 Congressional Record 12287).

=== Triggering an "Article V Convention" to propose the "Liberty" Amendment if Congress fails to act ===
- Wyoming – In 1959, the Wyoming Legislature adopted Enrolled Joint Resolution No. 2 in support and went so far as to suggest the alternative means of securing the "Liberty" Amendment via the calling of a convention—as outlined in Article V of the United States Constitution—if Congress should fail to propose it (105 Congressional Record 3085–3086);
- Louisiana – In 1960, the Louisiana Legislature adopted House Concurrent Resolution No. 22 likewise in support and likewise urging the calling of a convention should Congress fail to act (106 Congressional Record 14401); and
- South Carolina – In 1962, the South Carolina General Assembly adopted a Concurrent Resolution likewise in support and likewise urging the calling of a convention should Congress fail to act (108 Congressional Record 5051).

== See also ==
- The Liberty Amendments a 2013 book
- List of proposed amendments to the United States Constitution
