= Hiroyuki Doi =

Japanese outsider artist

- Born: 1946 (age 79–80); Nagoya, Japan
- Movement: Outsider art

Hiroyuki Doi (Japanese: 土井宏之) (born 1946) is a Japanese outsider artist and former chef.

== Early life ==
Hiroyuki Doi was born in Nagoya, Japan, in 1946. He moved to Tokyo where he started working as a chef and used his savings to travel and make trips to Europe where he visited Western art museums, and carefully studied recipes and ingredients of local cuisine. He eventually became a master chef, specializing in French, Italian, and Spanish cuisine, and taking work in some of the top restaurants across Tokyo. At the same time, he dabbled in a hobby of simple line drawing, creating illustrations of common subjects for assorted publications.

== Career ==
Doi began his art career in 1980, after the death of his younger brother from a brain tumor, giving up his career as a chef and turning to art for solace. According to his friend Yoshiko Otsuka, a manager and art dealer, Doi originally had been making paintings of flowers and foods in oil or watercolor. Around 1985, he gradually switched to circle drawings, but Otsuka "did not see them until some time later". Initially, she thought the drawings were peculiar but then started experiencing their "energy, sensitivity and movement".

Due to the personal nature of his work, two decades passed before Doi began to show it at public exhibitions. In 1999, Otsuka traveled to New York with an idea to approach galleries on Doi's behalf. Her New York friends suggested visiting the SoHo gallery managed by art dealer Phyllis Kind, who was recognized as a patron of the self-taught arts, including art brut. However, the gallery had been closed during her visit, and two years went by before Doi and Otsuka visited Kind's gallery in 2001, arriving without an appointment. Kind recalled that her roster of artists was full, and she was not seeking out any additional artists, but she got intrigued by their arrival and was "astonished by the obsessive intensity" crystallized on his drawing and its sincerity.

Kind began representing Doi, showing his art at Phyllis Kind Gallery (in 2001, 2003, and 2006), at the Outsider Art Fair, and at the "Obsessive Drawing" exhibition opened by the American Folk Art Museum in 2005. Since Kind's gallery discontinued its operation in 2009, Doi has been represented by Ricco/Maresca Gallery in New York. Doi has presented exhibitions at the Thomas Williams Gallery in London (2009) and The Museum of Everything (2009 and 2010) and had a major retrospective at the Pilot Pen Station Museum in Tokyo (2013). The Tokyo retrospective showcased his "Hope for the Earth", a drawing created in eight months as a tribute to the "souls of the many thousands who lost their lives" in the 2011 Tōhoku earthquake and tsunami. The drawing marked his exhibition debut in Japan. One of his paintings was showcased at "Approaching Abstraction", an exposition of self-taught artists at the American Folk Art Museum in 2010. Doi's work was included in the "Out of Thin Air: Emerging Forms" exhibition, which occurred between September 2024 and January 2025 in the Menil Drawing Institute in Texas.

His workspace is decorated with plants and situated in the Asakusa district of northeastern Tokyo.

== Style and reception ==
The majority of Hiroyuki Doi's drawings are derived from circular agglomerations that expand into complex compositions, where each individual circle differs in size "from very small to nearly subatomic and masses by the thousands into forms whose outlines, topographies and sense of inner light vary tremendously". In 2017, he noted that his technique has changed; his tiny circles have become even smaller, and his imagery has obtained a more three-dimensional appearance. The drawings are often compared to cosmos of drifting nebulae or swirling galaxies. Lindsay Pollock, writing for Art in America in 2011, described his drawings as both "microscopic while paradoxically appearing to contain the infinite vastness of the universe, or a star-filled sky". His style combines the traditions of Western and Asian art, drawing influence from the traditional Sino-Japanese ink paintings; and compared to the work of the contemporary artist Yayoi Kusama, while his most recent work is likened to the art of Nagasawa Rosetsu and Katsushika Hokusai.

Doi chose the circles imagery, saying that it supplied him with "relief from the sadness and grief" brought on by his brother's death. He also connected circles with "the transmigration of the soul, the cosmos, the coexistence of living creatures, human cells, human dialog and peace". He intended his art to convey a message to the future generations on "the importance of [a] human touch, not only in art, but in all communication in general". Doi told Hyperallergic that he keeps an eye on current events, which sometimes inspire him to start a new drawing. Arts journalist Edward M. Gómez found that circles in general represent "fullness, unity, vastness, and even the fecundity of the protective, enveloping womb", as well as a "symbol of the universe or, by contrast, of the void". According to his profile by the Ricco/Maresca Gallery, his art encapsulates "a spiritual preoccupation with the relationship between the smallest part and the whole; from cellular biology to the cosmos". The New York Times writer Roberta Smith was mesmerized by "unusually beautiful" drawings, adding a caveat that they have "the slight air of manufacture that can infect obsessive work". Moreover, she opined that his work would be better if Doi did not leave his signature that adds "a saccharine note".

Doi uses the Japanese-made Pilot's DR Drawing Pens with polyacetal tips, which he chose for their ability to reliably dispense ink and not dry out. Typically, he draws on a Japanese handmade paper produced by Ozu Washi, a store in Tokyo's Nihonbashi district that opened in 1653. Some of the sheets he used are made of bark-based fibers taken from paper mulberry or mitsumata. Doi cannot imagine using a computer to make art, saying that by drawing circles with his pen or pencil, he feels "truly alive and a part of the universe".

== Works ==
"Untitled (HDY 0115)", finished in 2015, depicts what appears to be a "bulbous plant slowly opening its protective husk to reveal an exotic, scaly core". "Untitled (HDY 0315)" takes the shape of "jewel-like encrustations" in the center part of the drawing and attacking the "heavens" or flowing out from "a tornado's blustery cone". Another drawing, "Soul (HDY 0413)", was characterized as "the most luxurious doughnut ever to have emerged from the unknowable ether". Its twin, "Soul II (HDY 3014)", depicts a "fuzzy, round form" tangled by "hydra's outward-reaching, lacy tentacles".

- "Untitled" (1985) — Collection of Paige and Todd Johnson.
- "Untitled" (1990) — The Menil Collection, Houston. Gift of Stephanie and John Smither.
- "Reincarnation of the Soul IV" (2007) — Owned by John B. Davidson; on long term loan to the Harvard Art Museums since 2018.
- "Untitled (HD 2210)" (2010)
- "Hope for the Earth" (2013) — The drawing is roughly 1.8 meters by 90 cm.
- "Soul (HD 0413)" (2013)
- "Soul II (HDY 3014)" (2014)
- "Untitled (HDY 0315)" (2015)
- "Untitled (HDY 0115)" (2015)
- "Untitled (HDY 2323)" (2020)
- "Untitled (HDY 2523)" (2020)

== Legacy ==
According to a 2013 article by The Japan Times, Hiroyuki Doi became "one of the best-known artists in the self-taught/outsider category in the United States and Western Europe", as well as enjoying "crossover appeal to collectors in the more avant-garde, contemporary-art sector". Doi's circle drawings are discussed in John Green's The Anthropocene Reviewed, which compares them to his endeavor of figuring out the "ideal form" for his signature, but he "can never quite achieve it".
