= Mark Levin =

American lawyer, radio and television personality (born 1957)

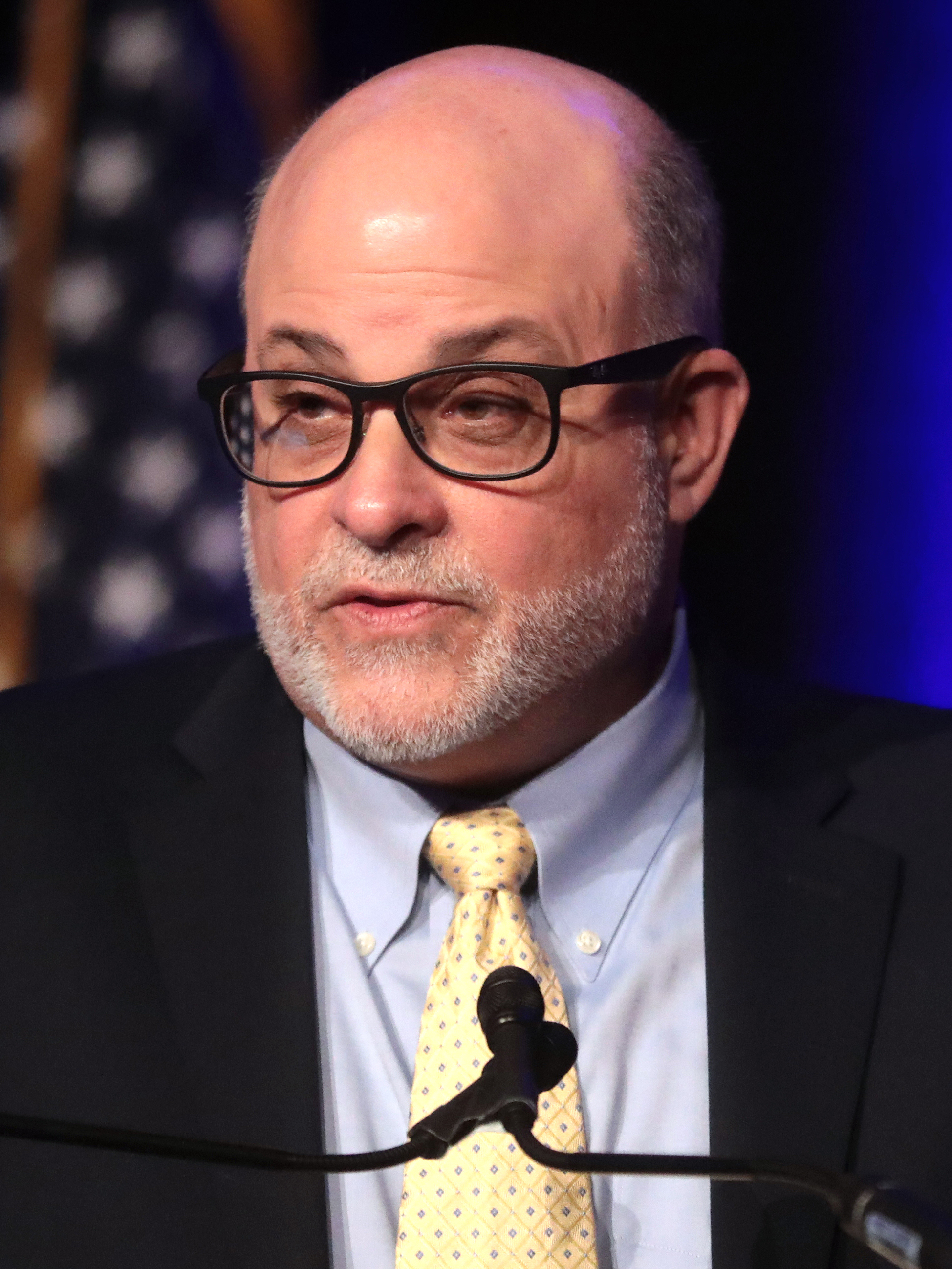
- Levin speaking at Turning Point USA, 2019
- Born: Mark Reed Levin; September 21, 1957 (age 69); Philadelphia, Pennsylvania, U.S.
- Education: Temple University Ambler (BA); Temple University (JD)
- Occupations: Broadcast news analyst, columnist, political commentator, radio personality, writer
- Spouse(s): Kendall Levin (m. 1985; div. 2010) Julie Strauss (m. 2017)
- Awards: National Radio Hall of Fame
- Website: marklevinshow.com

Mark Reed Levin (/ləˈvɪn/; born September 21, 1957) is an American conservative broadcast news analyst, columnist, lawyer, political commentator, radio personality, and writer. He is the host of syndicated radio show The Mark Levin Show, as well as Life, Liberty & Levin on Fox News. Previously, Levin worked in the administration of President Ronald Reagan and was chief of staff for Attorney General Edwin Meese. He is the former president of the Landmark Legal Foundation, an author of seven books, and contributor to media outlets such as National Review Online. Since 2015, Levin has been editor-in-chief of the Conservative Review.

A neoconservative, he is known for his staunch support of Israel and hawkish foreign policy. He is known for his strident criticisms of Democrats and encouragement of primary challenges to congressional Republicans he considers to be "Republican In Name Only" (RINO). He endorsed Ted Cruz in the 2016 Republican Party presidential primaries and declared himself "Never Trump", but reluctantly endorsed Donald Trump after he won the Republican nomination. His commentary was supportive of Trump during his first presidency. In April 2025, President Trump appointed Levin to become a member of the Homeland Security Advisory Council.

== Early life and education ==
Mark Reed Levin, one of three boys, was born in Philadelphia to a Jewish family, and grew up in Erdenheim as well as Elkins Park. His father, Jack E. Levin (1925–2018), authored several books. He graduated from Cheltenham High School after three years, in 1974. Skipping his senior year of high school, Levin enrolled at Temple University Ambler and graduated magna cum laude and Phi Beta Kappa with a B.A. in Political Science in 1977 at age 19. Later in 1977, Levin won election to the Cheltenham school board on a platform of reducing property taxes. In 1980, Levin earned a J.D. from Temple University School of Law.

== Legal and political career ==
Levin worked for the Texas Instruments legal department after law school. Beginning in 1981, Levin worked in the administration of President Ronald Reagan. Levin began at ACTION, the federal agency that oversaw VISTA and other volunteer agencies, before serving as deputy assistant secretary for elementary and secondary education at the U.S. Department of Education and deputy solicitor of the U.S. Department of the Interior. He ultimately became chief of staff to Attorney General Edwin Meese.

After leaving the Reagan administration, Levin practiced law in the private sector. In 1991, Levin joined public interest law firm Landmark Legal Foundation. At Landmark, Levin served as director of legal policy and the foundation's Washington-based Center for Civil Rights before becoming president in 1997. Under Levin's presidency, Landmark Legal filed a complaint with the Federal Election Commission in 2000 alleging that the National Education Association, the largest teachers' union in the U.S., did not disclose spending on political activity in Internal Revenue Service documentation. Landmark Legal also filed similar complaints with the United States Department of Labor in 2002 regarding NEA and political activity; by 2006, the NEA and smaller American Federation of Teachers had filed new documents with the Labor Department revealing over $100 million combined in political action spending.

Following Freedom of Information Act requests in August 2012 of documents that would show if Environmental Protection Agency officials sought to delay regulations until after the 2012 presidential election, federal judge Royce Lamberth ruled in 2015 that although Landmark Legal did not establish that the EPA acted in bad faith, the EPA either carelessly or intentionally neglected Landmark's FOIA request. Lamberth previously ruled in 2013 that the EPA might have attempted to evade Landmark's FOIA request.

In 2001, the American Conservative Union awarded Levin its Ronald Reagan Award for his work with Landmark Legal. Politico reported in 2014 that Levin received a salary of more than $300,000 per year as president of the non-profit Landmark Legal Foundation, whose donors include the Sarah Scaife Foundation, the Charles G. Koch Charitable Foundation and ExxonMobil. In 2018, Levin stepped down as president of Landmark Legal but remained on its board of directors.

In April 2025, President Trump appointed Levin to become a member of the Homeland Security Advisory Council.

== Radio broadcasting ==
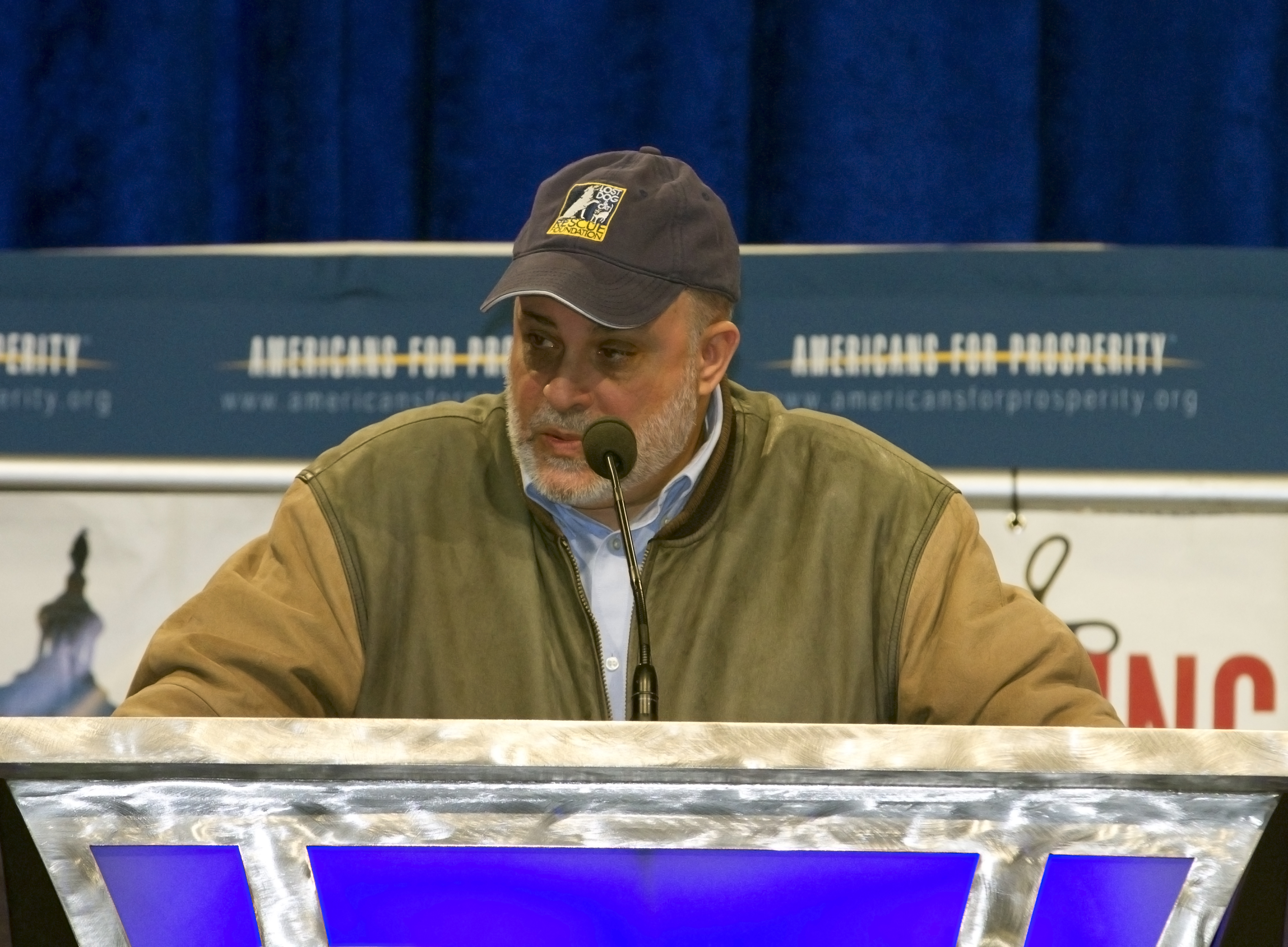
Levin speaks at the 2011 Defending the American Dream Conference hosted by Americans for Prosperity.

Levin began his broadcasting career as a guest on conservative talk radio programs. For many years, he was a contributor of legal opinions to The Rush Limbaugh Show, appearing more regularly as the Monica Lewinsky scandal developed. About this time, Sean Hannity became aware of him, and he began to feature in Hannity's radio show. Eventually, Levin gained a radio slot of his own on WABC, initially on Sundays beginning in 2002, then in the timeslot following Hannity's program in 2003. Cumulus Media Networks began syndicating The Mark Levin Show nationally in 2006.

Levin has participated in Freedom Concerts, an annual benefit concert to aid families of fallen soldiers, and uses his radio program to promote aid to military families. Levin is also involved with Move America Forward, a charity that sends care packages to soldiers serving overseas.

In July 2024, Levin signed a multi-year extension with Westwood One and Cumulus Media covering both The Mark Levin Show and the Mark Levin Audio Rewind podcast on the Cumulus Podcast Network.

On November 16, 2018, he was inducted into the National Radio Hall of Fame. In February 2023, Cumulus launched Levin's official podcast channel on YouTube, featuring Mark Levin Audio Rewind and archived podcast-related segments. In October 2024, Levin began co-hosting On the Frontlines with Mark Levin and Yael Eckstein, a limited podcast series with Yael Eckstein of the International Fellowship of Christians and Jews. In November 2024, Cumulus launched Liberty and Learning with Mark Levin and Larry Arnn, a 10-part podcast series hosted by Levin and Hillsdale College president Larry P. Arnn.

== Television shows ==
Since 2014, Levin has been the founding editor-in-chief of Conservative Review, a multi-platform online television network that later merged with Glenn Beck's terrestrial network TheBlaze in 2018 to form Blaze Media. Programs airing on the network include Levin, Roaming Millennial, Truth Be Told, Allie, In the Woods with Phil, Kibbe on Liberty, Louder with Crowder, America Bolling, and more.

In November 2017, Fox News announced that it had signed Levin for a weekend show titled Life, Liberty & Levin to air on Sunday nights beginning in February 2018. According to a pre-debut network news release, the program's intention was to explore "the fundamental values and principles undergirding American society, culture, politics, and current events, and their relevance to the nation's future and everyday lives of citizens." Episodes feature one or two guests for the hour-long program discussing political events, news, and history. In September 2023, Fox News announced that Levin's show would air new episodes on Saturdays as well as its usual Sunday timeslot, starting on September 16.

== Writer ==
Levin wrote the 2005 book Men In Black: How The Supreme Court Is Destroying America, in which he advanced his thesis that activist judges on the Supreme Court (from all parts of the political spectrum) have "legislated from the bench". Commentary magazine's Dan Seligman wrote that Levin asks readers "to identify with 'originalists' who look to the text of the Constitution and the intent of its framers, and to reject the 'activists' who construe the Constitution broadly and are more concerned with getting to their own 'desired outcomes'". Slate magazine's Dahlia Lithwick wrote that "no serious scholar of the court or the Constitution, on the ideological left or right, is going to waste their time engaging Levin's arguments once they've read this book".

Rescuing Sprite: A Dog Lover's Story of Joy and Anguish is a non-fiction work written by Levin in 2007 about his experience of rescuing a dog named Sprite from a local animal shelter.

Liberty and Tyranny: A Conservative Manifesto was released in 2009, and became a #1 New York Times best seller for eleven of twelve weeks, as well as No. 1 on Nielsen BookScan and No. 2 on Amazon.com's list of bestselling books of 2009. The book includes discussion of issues Levin believes need to be addressed in the United States. In Liberty and Tyranny Levin repudiates the use of the term "progressive" to describe "modern Liberals", and argues that "statist" would instead be a proper term. Liberty and Tyranny has sold over one million copies according to Threshold Editions, the book's publisher. Andrew C. McCarthy, in The New Criterion, wrote, "Levin offers not so much a defense as a plan of attack" against "America's Leftist ascendancy". Other reviewers critiqued the book as "analysis utterly useless in understanding more than half of the American political landscape" while opining that "Levin resorts to the same old misinformation to sell his brand of conservatism".

Ameritopia: The Unmaking of America was issued in 2012. In Ameritopia, Levin discusses the origins and development of both the modern day conservative and liberal political philosophies, the latter of which he refers to as "statist", through the works of some of the leading figures in American history. Included are commentaries on works by Plato, Sir Thomas More, Thomas Hobbes, Karl Marx, John Locke, Charles de Montesquieu and Alexis de Tocqueville. Conor Friedersdorf's review, published in The Atlantic, criticized the text's argument that statism is based on utopianism, and Carlin Romano, in The Chronicle of Higher Education, wrote that "Ameritopia is really Ameritastrophe. It's disastrously bad from beginning to end."

In Levin's 2013 book, The Liberty Amendments: Restoring the American Republic, he suggests eleven new Constitutional amendments. The book debuted at #1 on The New York Times Best Seller list. Hans A. von Spakovsky of National Review Online called the book "required reading for conservative bloggers". Ana Marie Cox, writing in The Guardian, said the book "contains some radical notions about a complete overhaul of the US constitution, but to debate the specifics of their merits is to ignore the larger insanity of the project" while noting "the ludicrousness of his specific 'fixes' and the near-impossibility of achieving them". Also in The Washington Times, Richard W. Rahn wrote, "If The Liberty Amendments can help foster a national debate about which corrective actions, including constitutional amendments, are needed to increase liberty and prosperity, Mr. Levin will have performed a great national service". Hoover Institution fellow David Davenport wrote in Forbes that Levin's book used "weak arguments".

Levin's Plunder and Deceit: Big Government's Exploitation of Young People and the Future was published in 2015, and Rediscovering Americanism and the Tyranny of Progressivism in 2017.

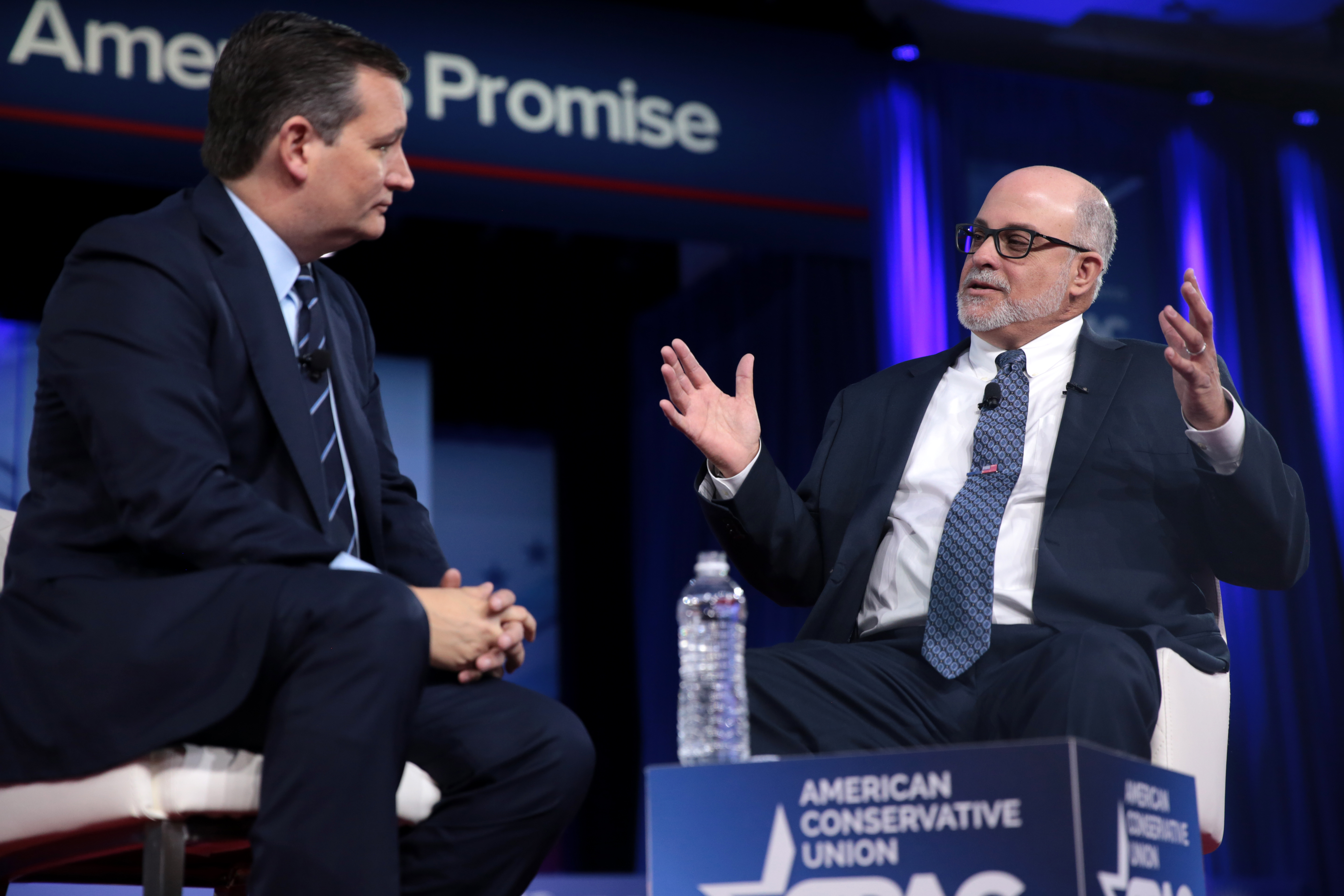
Levin and Ted Cruz at the 2017 CPAC conference

Levin's Unfreedom of the Press, which was released on May 21, 2019, became the number one best-selling book on Amazon.com three days before its official release, as a result of pre-order sales. Unfreedom of the Press also became a New York Times #1 best-seller on June 6, 2019, in the combined print & e-book nonfiction and hardcover nonfiction categories. Lloyd Green was critical of the book in The Guardian writing that the book "is not exactly fan fiction but it can get ahead of itself when discussing the special counsel's conclusions, ending up sounding like the 'fake news' the author and Trump both purport to abhor." Annalisa Quinn, writing for NPR, stated: "the book is largely filler. Quotations and paraphrasing make up the majority of the book's central chapters. Lengthy and irrelevant block quotes from historians about, say, colonial printing practices... give the book the air of a padded student essay." Quinn also wrote, "[Levin] conducts no interviews, presents no original research, and visits no newsrooms", and "When Levin does offer his own analysis, it can approach parody." On June 8, 2019, Levin appeared on C-SPAN2's Book TV to discuss Unfreedom of the Press, "in which he argued that the press has lowered its standards in providing objective and trustworthy journalism."

In 2021, Levin published American Marxism. As of November 14, 2021, the book had spent 16 weeks on the New York Times Bestseller List for nonfiction.

== Political views ==
A 2016 study which sought to measure incendiary discourse on talk radio and TV found that Levin scored highest on its measure of "outrage". The study looked at 10 prominent radio and television programs, known for incendiary discourse on political matters, and scored content on the basis of whether it used "emotional display", "misrepresentative exaggeration", "mockery", "conflagration", "slippery slope", "insulting" or "obscene language", and other factors, finding that Levin was the radio host who engaged in the most outrage. The study found that he utilized "outrage speech or behavior at a rate of more than one instance per minute." In How Democracies Die, Harvard University political scientists Daniel Ziblatt and Steven Levitsky write that Mark Levin was among the popular right-wing talk radio hosts who "helped to legitimate the use of uncivil discourse" in American politics, and contribute to the erosion of democratic norms. According to Politico, Levin has a "penchant for hysteria."

=== Views on politicians and other individuals ===
According to The Guardian, "constant attacks on Democrats and the left are important components" of Levin's modus operandi. According to Politico in May 2009, Levin pronounced "almost daily" that Obama "was a failure, a liar, and a 'statist' who is trying to destroy individual freedom." According to Rutgers University political scientist Stephen Eric Bronner, Levin tends to use "socialism" as a "catch-all term to condemn any policy that strengthens the social welfare function of the state." In July 2014, he called Jon Stewart "a knee-jerk idiot", and suggested that Stewart was a self-hating Jew. He has stated that "Nancy Pelosi's politics comes as close to a form of modern-day fascism as I've ever seen". In January 2019, he said Pelosi was "America's first fascist. And that's a fact". Levin said the new Congressional Speaker had "hijacked" the federal government by deciding to block the financing of President Trump's border wall. Levin has also mocked how Pelosi looks, referred to Beto O'Rourke as a "weak man", and called Dick Blumenthal a "pathetic, loathsome liar".

He has criticized Republicans – including Paul Ryan, Lindsey Graham, John McCain, and Mitch McConnell – with whom he disagrees. He sometimes refers to such individuals as RINOs. Levin endorsed Orrin Hatch when he faced a primary challenge in 2012, but later apologized for his endorsement when Hatch said that he would be willing to support a path to citizenship for undocumented immigrants. Since then, he endorsed a number of Republican primary challengers to incumbent Republican senators. Levin supported the Tea Party Patriots' campaign to "fire" House Speaker John Boehner. Earlier in 2010, Levin criticized Glenn Beck for his criticism of congressional Republicans. He has referred to Mitt Romney as an "ass" and called CNN host Brian Stelter a "creep".

Levin supported U.S. Representative Mo Brooks in his campaign in the 2017 Alabama special election against incumbent Luther Strange, who had received a temporary appointment earlier that year.

Levin strongly defended former EPA head Scott Pruitt while he was under a dozen separate ethics investigations. Levin said Pruitt's "policies on the whole have been outstanding," and "I don't throw good people under the bus because the left targets them."

=== Sponsorship and conflicts of interest ===
During the 2012 election cycle, Levin's show was paid at least $757,000 in sponsorship by the Koch brothers-backed Americans for Prosperity to run ads for the group, a deal which began in the summer of 2010. After the sponsorship ended, Levin began making ads for the Tea Party Patriots. The Senate Conservatives Fund paid Simon & Schuster at least $427,000 for copies of Levin's Liberty or Tyranny in September and October 2013. During the same period, on his radio show and Facebook page, Levin frequently promoted the group, which has funded primary challengers of Senate Republicans. Levin did not disclose that the group had made $427,000 of purchases of his book.

Levin endorsed Orrin Hatch when Levin was being sponsored by Americans for Prosperity (AFP) which also endorsed Hatch. Levin withdrew his endorsement of Hatch when Levin was being sponsored by the Tea Party Patriots. Levin dismissed the allegations that he engages in "pay-to-play".

=== Barack Obama ===
In 2009, Levin described as "absolutely right" the statement by Sarah Palin that the Patient Protection and Affordable Care Act (Obamacare) includes death panels to decide whether elderly people or sick children were worthy of medical care. In 2011, a caller to Levin's show, claiming to be a neurosurgeon, said that the Department of Health and Human Services had issued a document saying that people over age 70 would not be allowed to receive medical treatments. Levin said to the caller, "so Sarah Palin was right." The call was later revealed to be a hoax and the death panel claims were revealed to be false. In late 2013, Levin said there were similarities between a gathering of "hand-picked" supporters of the Affordable Care Act chosen by the Obama administration to Nazi Sturmabteilung or "Brownshirts" drawing comparisons of the propaganda techniques of the two groups.

Levin stated in 2013 that "the Muslim Brotherhood has infiltrated our government" and described President Obama as a Muslim Brotherhood "sympathizer". He speculated in November 2014 that, after the 2014 mid-term elections, Obama might go "full Mussolini".

In February 2015, Levin stated that President Obama was "seeking to destroy Israel" because "Obama has an affinity for Islam far more than Christianity or Judaism." He blamed Obama for the Ebola crisis: "the political policies of this administration which opens the door wide to people from the poorest parts of the world. We don't know who they are, we don't know if they have diseases."

=== WMDs in Iraq ===
In 2014, Levin claimed that the Bush administration's original WMD rationale for the Iraq War had been vindicated by citing reports of U.S. soldiers in Iraq that were wounded by the decayed remnants of Saddam Hussein's chemical weapons arsenal. The remnants in question were degraded and unusable chemical weapons shells from the 1980s. Levin faulted the Bush administration for not doing more to publicize these remnants of Iraq's former WMD program.

=== Donald Trump ===
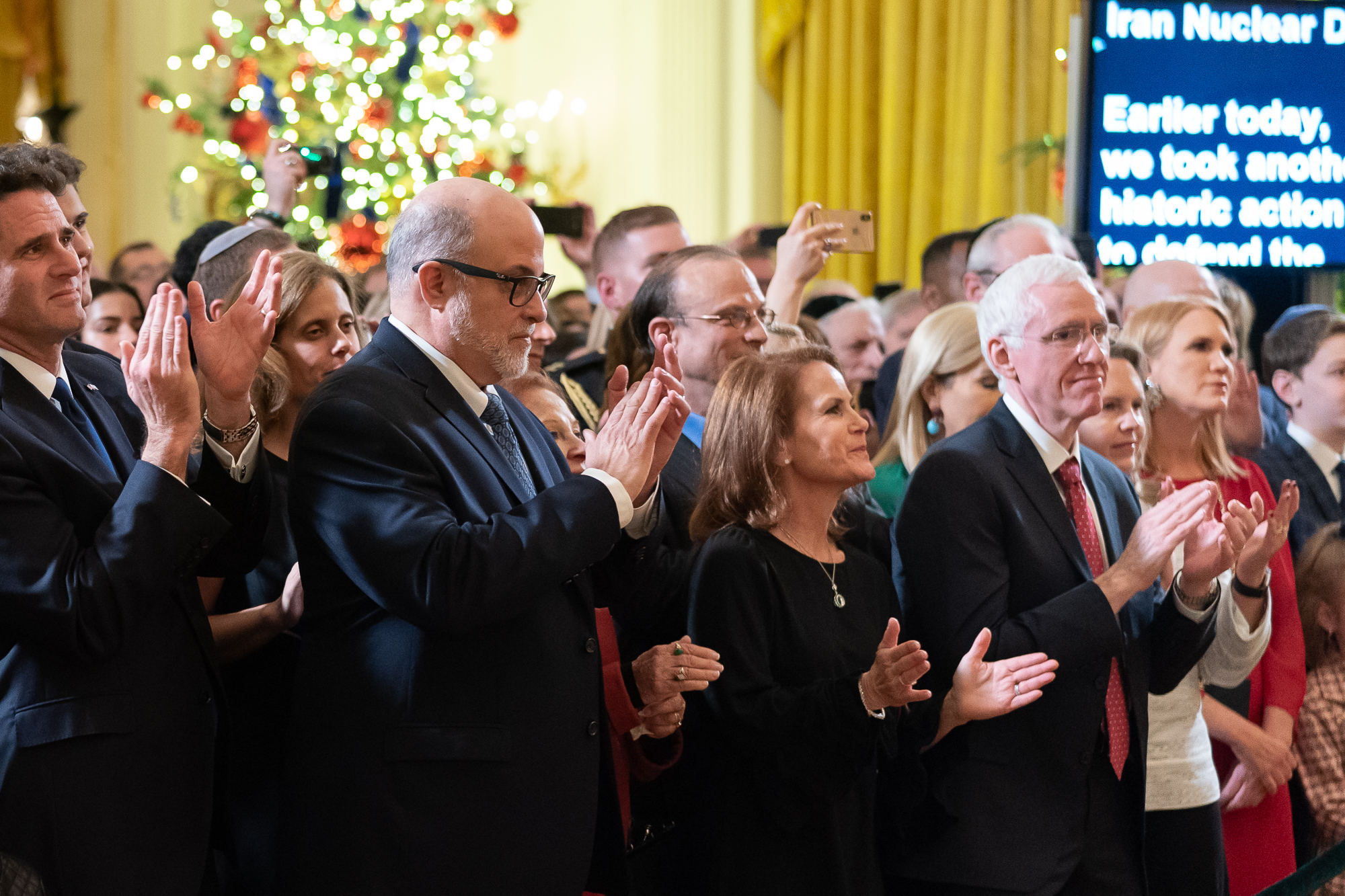
Levin and Israeli Ambassador Ron Dermer at a Hanukkah reception at the White House in 2019

In March 2016, Levin endorsed Ted Cruz for the 2016 Republican presidential nomination. Over a month after Donald Trump was nominated, in September 2016, Levin stated on this radio program that he would vote for Trump in the presidential election, following his declaration earlier that year that he was in the "Never Trump" camp and would never vote for Trump. He qualified his support by stating: "I take no responsibility for the dumb things he says or the dumb things his surrogates say."

==== Wiretap claim ====
In March 2017, Levin alleged that the Obama administration had used "police state" surveillance tactics against the Donald Trump campaign during the 2016 presidential election. The Associated Press said that Levin "voiced without evidence the idea that Obama had wiretapped Trump Tower". Levin protested the AP report vigorously, demanding a retraction and an apology on the grounds that his sources for the statement included The New York Times and other newspapers. His statement was reprinted by Breitbart News and reportedly became the basis of President Trump's unfounded Trump Tower wiretapping allegations. According to the Guardian, Levin had combined reports from multiple sources, including tabloid sites, to justify the claims. In September 2017, reports emerged of a court-ordered Federal Bureau of Investigation (FBI) wiretap on Trump campaign chairman Paul Manafort; while certain Trump supporters alleged that this surveillance vindicated Levin and Trump's unsupported assertions, The Atlantic commented: "This is not true – Trump claimed he had been the subject of Obama-ordered, politically motivated surveillance, for which there remains no evidence."

==== "Deep State" conspiracy theories ====
Levin has said that there was a "coup" occurring against the first presidency of Donald Trump waged by Obama loyalists. Levin's coup claim was referring to investigations of the Russian interference in the 2016 United States elections and of alleged obstruction of justice by Trump. He has suggested that former FBI Director James Comey used the Trump-Russia dossier "to blackmail the president." He has claimed that Special Counsel Robert Mueller engaged in a "Deep State" coup against Trump.

==== Trump–Ukraine scandal ====
After President Trump pressed the President of Ukraine to start an investigation into Democratic presidential candidate Joe Biden and his son, Levin strongly defended Trump's actions. Asked on Fox & Friends whether Levin was "okay" with Trump asking a foreign leader for "dirt" on Biden, Levin lashed out at the Fox & Friends host and repeatedly shouted there was "no problem" with what Trump did. Shortly thereafter, Trump praised Levin and retweeted more than 20 tweets by viewers praising Levin. Levin also accused Joe Biden of being the one who "did something illegal", though he did not provide evidence or any elaboration.

In October 2019, while Trump was the subject of the impeachment inquiry, Levin said that on his Blaze TV show: "While he's been president there hasn't even been a hint of scandal. Not a hint!" He was highly critical of Mitt Romney who increased his criticisms of President Trump during this period.

==== 2020 election ====
Following the 2020 presidential election, as all significant media organizations reported Joe Biden had won, Levin told his radio audience that the Democrats were "stealing the election". He insisted on Twitter to his 2.4 million followers: "there's lots of evidence of voter fraud and election screw-ups." On the same platform, on November 5, Levin called on Republican-controlled state legislatures to disregard the results of the 2020 election and send electors to the Electoral College who would vote for Trump. The suggestion was retweeted by Donald Trump Jr.

He praised Sidney Powell, a member of Trump's legal team, for what he considered to be her patriotism after she promoted conspiracy theories about the 2020 election and sought to overturn election results. He frequently had guests on his show who led the audience to think Joe Biden's win in the presidential election could be overturned.

On January 5, 2021, Levin insisted Congress's imminent counting of the Electoral College votes was an act of "tyranny" because of the supposed fraud. He told his listeners, "If we don't fight on Jan. 6 on the floor of the Senate and the House... then we are done." Following the next day's storming of the Capitol in Washington, he continued in the same vein. "It appears nothing has changed in 24 hours... Not a damn thing. The never-Trumpers, the RINOs, the media — same damn thing," although he was critical of the rioters. Meanwhile, on the same day as the riot, Cumulus Media circulated a memo instructing its presenters, a roster which includes Levin, to cease implying the 2020 presidential election was stolen or face the end of the right to broadcast via Cumulus.

=== COVID-19 pandemic ===
During the COVID-19 pandemic, Levin downplayed the threat of the virus, arguing that the media was overreacting and that the death toll from the flu was higher than the coronavirus.

=== Russo-Ukrainian War ===
Following the 2022 Russian invasion of Ukraine, Levin has supported Ukraine, saying that if Russia defeated Ukraine, Vladimir Putin would take further aggressive action. He also criticized the Joe Biden administration for its response, which he considered to be lacking, and the isolationists and the "Putin wings" of the media, Democratic Party and the Republican Party. He also called for the US to arm Taiwan to defend themselves from China and call off the negotiations with Iran. At the 2022 CPAC, Levin criticized populism and nationalism and called for the US to support Ukraine, saying that the CPAC means Conservative Political Action Committee, not "McGovern, populist or nationalist action committee" and "We love America because it's America, not because we're nationalists. I mean, the Russians are nationalists. The Chinese are nationalists. America First is about Americanism, first", and "You want a world war? Then become an ostrich, put your head in the sand and let the Russians roll through one country after another".

=== Gaza war ===
In July 2025, Levin dismissed reports about the consequences of the famine in the Gaza Strip during the war in Gaza, arguing that Israel should not be told to feed its enemies. Levin said he was "sick and tired of these Western Europeans lecturing the state of Israel on how to fight a war."

=== 2026 Iran war ===
During the 2026 Iran war, Levin said that the US needs to prepare to deal with a power vacuum in Iran after the government falls, and that failure to do so could mean that another extremist government could take control.

== Personal life ==
Levin is married to Julie Strauss Levin. In 2000, he suffered a heart attack and underwent open heart surgery.

== Selected publications ==
- Levin, M. R. (2005). Men in Black: How the Supreme Court is Destroying America. Regnery Publishing
- Levin, M. R. (2007). Rescuing Sprite: A Dog Lover's Story of Joy and Anguish. (1st ed.) Pocket Books
- Levin, M. R. (2010). Liberty and Tyranny: A Conservative Manifesto. (Reprint ed.) Threshold Editions
- Levin, M. R. (2012). Ameritopia: The Unmaking of America. (Reprint ed.) Threshold Editions
- Levin, M. R. (2014). The Liberty Amendments. (Reprint ed.) Threshold Editions
- Levin, M. R. (2017). Rediscovering Americanism: And the Tyranny of Progressivism. Threshold Editions
- Levin, M. R. (2019). Unfreedom of the Press. Threshold Editions
- Levin, M. R. (2021). American Marxism. Threshold Editions
- Levin, M. R. (2023). The Democrat Party Hates America. Threshold Editions.
- Levin, M. R. (2025). On Power. Threshold Editions ISBN 978-1982146191
