= Bæjarins Beztu Pylsur =

Hot dog stand chain in Reykjavík, Iceland

Coordinates: 64°08′53″N 21°56′16″W

- Logo

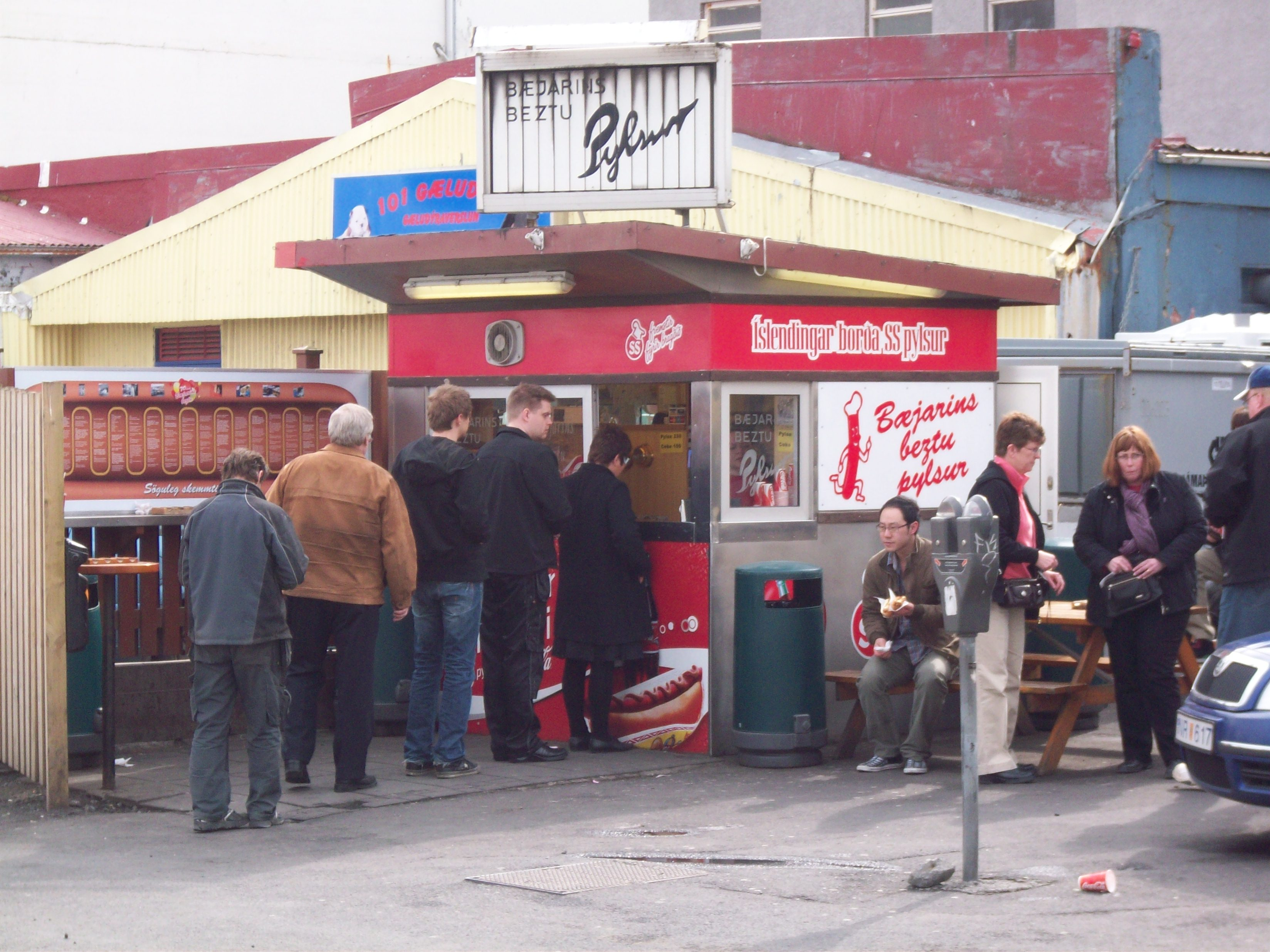
- The flagship stand in Tryggvagata
- Industry: Street food
- Founded: 1937; 89 years ago in Reykjavík, Iceland
- Area served: Reykjavík
- Products: Hot dogs
- Owner: Guðrún Kristmundsdóttir
- Website: bbp.is

Bæjarins Beztu Pylsur (Icelandic pronunciation: [ˈpaiːjarɪns ˈpɛstʏ ˈpʰɪlsʏr̥], English: The Town's Best Hot Dogs) is a small chain of hot dog stands located in Reykjavík, Iceland.

== History ==
The chain has been in continuous operation since 1937 when the first stand was set up on Austurstræti street at the very centre of the city by Jón Sveinsson, the grandfather of longtime owner, Guðrún Björk Kristmundsdóttir. Under her leadership the company expanded significantly. Following her death in early September 2025, her son Baldur Ingi Halldórsson, now the fourth generation in the family, assumed control of the operations.

In the 1960s, it moved two streets north to Tryggvagata, across from the Harpa Concert Hall, where the current flagship stand remains today.

In August 2004, the stand was visited by former United States president Bill Clinton while he was visiting Iceland for a UNICEF conference. This celebrity appearance led to a boost in popularity for the stand as it began appearing in tourism guidebooks on Iceland. Two years later in August 2006, the British newspaper The Guardian selected Bæjarins Beztu as the best hot dog stand in Europe.

Today, the chain is popular with both tourists and locals. There are three additional locations in the city, which together sell over one thousand hot dogs on a busy day.

Employee at the flagship stand prepares a hot dog "eina með öllu" (with everything).

Bæjarins Beztu sells hot dogs that are lamb-based with pork and beef. They are served in a bun with a choice of condiments: ketchup, sweet mustard, remoulade, crisp fried onion and raw onion. Customers who want everything often use the Icelandic phrase "eina með öllu" (English: "one with everything").

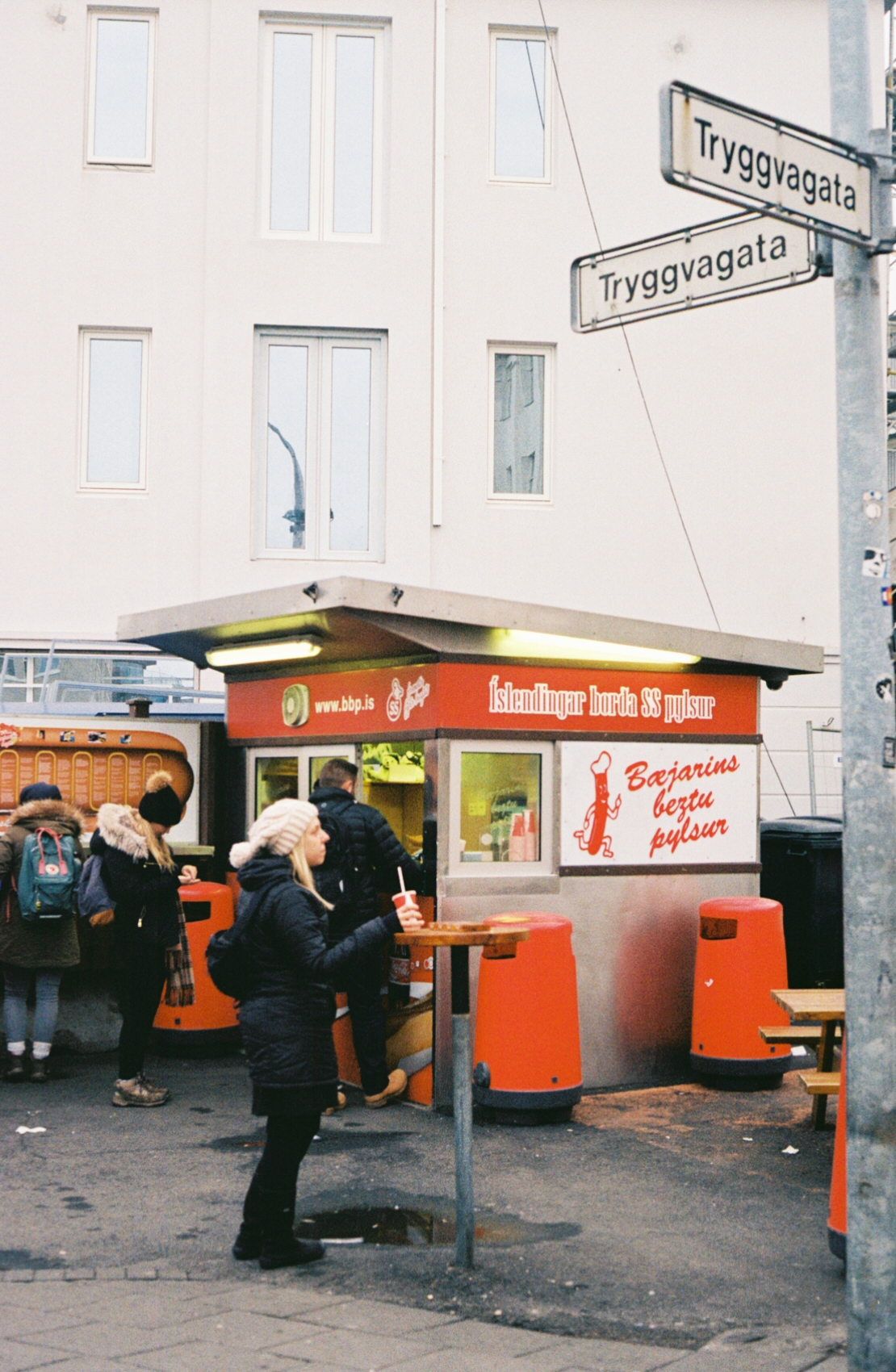
Stand and intersection of streets

By May 2022, a hot dog cost 600 krónur (€4,2), increasing to 880 krónur (€6.0) in 2026.

== Visitors ==
A number of celebrity patrons have visited the stand. In 2004, Former US president Bill Clinton ordered a hot dog with nothing but mustard. At the time it was considered an odd request, so much so that it is still referenced.

Other famous visitors include Metallica frontman James Hetfield, actor Charlie Sheen, and reality star Kim Kardashian. The main stand also appeared in the first season of Anthony Bourdain's travel program No Reservations. South Korean idols Go Won and Olivia Hye from the girl group Loona have visited the shop.

Author and YouTube personality John Green reviewed the stand in an episode of his podcast The Anthropocene Reviewed, as well as the book adaptation, having visited in 2008.
