= Rescuing Sprite =

2007 book by Mark Levin

Rescuing Sprite: A Dog Lover's Story of Joy and Anguish is a non-fiction work written in 2007 by Mark Levin, that tells his experience of rescuing a dog named Sprite from a local animal shelter that would change his and his family's lives forever.

== Summary ==
After much convincing, Mark Levin and his family adopted a Spaniel mix named Sprite and immediately the whole family developed a deep bond with him. Even the Levin's current dog from years prior, Pepsi, develops a deep relationship with the newly rescued Sprite right off the bat. Three weeks after rescuing Sprite, the Levin family started to notice Sprite's health was deteriorating and Sprite eventually collapses on Halloween, landing him and the Levin family a visit to the animal hospital. Little did the Levin family know, this would be the first of many visits to the animal hospital as Sprite's condition continually worsened. Further, they discover him to be older than they had originally thought. It shows the pain, passion, and love the Levin family and Sprite experience with their short amount of time together.

== Main characters ==
- Mark Levin- Author, Father, Husband
- Kendall Levin- Wife and Mother
- Lauren Levin- Daughter
- Chase Levin- Son
- Pepsi- Dog
- Sprite- Rescued Dog
