= The Liberty Amendments =

2013 book by Mark Levin

The Liberty Amendments: Restoring the American Republic
- Author: Mark Levin
- Language: English
- Publisher: Simon & Schuster
- Publication date: August 13, 2013
- Publication place: United States
- Media type: Print (hardback, paperback), e-book, audio
- Pages: 272 (hardcback)
- ISBN: 1451606273

The Liberty Amendments: Restoring the American Republic is a book by the American talk radio host and lawyer Mark Levin, published in 2013. Levin makes a case for eleven amendments which he believes would restore the Constitution's chief components: federalism, republicanism, and limited government.

== Summary ==
The eleven amendments proposed by Levin:

1. Impose Congressional term limits
2. Repeal the Seventeenth Amendment, returning the election of Senators to state legislatures
3. Impose term limits for Supreme Court Justices and restrict judicial review
4. Require a balanced budget and limit federal spending and taxation
5. Define a deadline to file taxes (one day before the next federal election)
6. Subject federal departments and bureaucratic regulations to periodic reauthorization and review
7. Create a more specific definition of the Commerce Clause
8. Limit eminent domain powers
9. Allow states to more easily amend the Constitution by bypassing Congress
10. Create a process where two-thirds of the states can nullify federal laws
11. Require photo ID to vote and limit early voting

Levin would have these amendments proposed to the states by a convention of the states as described in Article Five of the Constitution.

== Reception ==
The book debuted at #1 on The New York Times Best Seller list in all three categories for which it qualified.

== See also ==
- Proposed "Liberty" Amendment to the United States Constitution
- List of proposed amendments to the United States Constitution
