= Ocean Prey =

2021 novel by John Sandford

- First edition cover
- Author: John Sandford
- Cover artist: Katy Riegel
- Language: English
- Series: The Prey Series
- Genre: Fiction, Mystery, Suspense, Thriller, Crime
- Set in: Florida
- Publisher: G. P. Putnam's Sons
- Publication date: April 13, 2021
- Publication place: United States
- Media type: Print (hardback and large print paperback)/digital (audiobook and Kindle)
- Pages: 432
- ISBN: 978-0593087022
- Preceded by: Neon Prey
- Website: johnsandford.org

Ocean Prey is a mystery, and suspense novel by John Sandford released in 2021. The book reached number one on the New York Times Best Seller list. The novel is about two detectives who investigate the murder of three members of the Coast Guard. The novel is the 31st in Sandford's Prey Series.

== Plot ==
Lucas Davenport is the star character from the series of novels that Sandford wrote, called the Prey Series. Sandford also wrote a series of novels using a character named Virgil Flowers. In the novel Ocean Prey both characters Lucas Davenport and Virgil Flowers are brought together to investigate the murder of three members of the Coast Guard in Florida.

The drug smugglers who killed the Coast Guard officials hide their drugs at the bottom of the ocean and set their own boat on fire to hide any evidence. When the FBI does not make the case a priority, Flowers goes undercover to infiltrate a criminal operation. Virgil Flowers teams up with a female partner named Rae. After joining the gang of drug smugglers, Flowers goes diving in 100 feet (30 m) of water to try to recover the drugs for the criminals.

== Major themes ==
- Underwater diving
- Drug smuggling
- Murder
- Undercover operation

== Reception ==
The book reached number one on the New York Times Best Seller list May 2, 2021.

The novel reached number one an Amazon's Most sold list April 24, 2021.

On May 11, 2021, the book was Apple Store's number 9 novel.

Ray Walsh from the Lansing State Journal called the book "A wild ride." Tim O'Connell from the Jacksonville Florida Times-Union said that the book had witty banter and that "Sandford always produces a good reading adventure... ".

Because of the diving themes, one critic has said the book was too technical, and the story drags in the middle. The author concluded the book with a statement to readers: "If you are a diver, and you do find a serious error... I don't want to hear about it..."

== See also ==
- The New York Times Fiction Best Sellers of 2021
