= Gathering Prey =

2015 novel by John Sandford

- First edition
- Author: John Sandford
- Genre: Thriller, Crime, Drama
- Publisher: G. P. Putnam's Sons
- Publication date: April 25, 2015
- ISBN: 0-399-16879-6
- Followed by: Extreme Prey

Gathering Prey is a crime novel written by Pulitzer Prize winning writer John Sandford. It is the twenty-fifth book in the Prey series and one of the few books to deal with underground sub-cultures such as: Street Kids, Travelers, Juggalos and Crust Punks.

== Plot ==
Letty, a young college girl, receives a call from Skye, a traveler she met briefly in San Francisco. Remembering that Letty's adoptive father is a detective she requests help in finding her companion Henry, who has just gone missing. Soon Skye is missing as well and Detective Lucas Davenport decides to investigate further. He soon finds himself pursuing a drug dealer named Pilate in a chance that crosses state lines and exposes him to variety of sub cultures and their gatherings.

== Characters ==
=== Detective Lucas Davenport ===
The lead investigator of Minnesota's Bureau of Criminal Apprehension who is convinced by his adoptive daughter Letty to look into Henry's disappearance but soon finds himself in over his head investigating something far greater than just a missing persons case.

=== Letty ===
Detective Devenport's adopted daughter and a student at Stanford. Letty befriends Skye and Henry when in San Francisco.

=== Skye ===
Henry's companion and part of a group of "travelers" who go from city to city panhandling

=== Henry ===
Skye's companion who goes missing, and is described as a "punk from Texas"

=== Pilate ===
A drug dealing psychopath who kills without remorse. He is the leader of the gang the Disciples and the prime suspect in Henry's disappearance.

== Published ==
Gathering Prey was published on April 25, 2015, by G.P. Putnam's Sons publishing which is a division of Penguin Random House.

== Reviews ==
Gathering Prey was a Mass Market Paperback best seller, an indie best seller and one of the top ten book on Apple's iBooks-US. Gathering Prey was one of the Top Hundred Books of 2015 according to USA Today. The Lansing State Journal considered Gathering Prey to be one of Sandford's best crime books.
