= Landmark Legal Foundation =

American conservative legal advocacy group

Coordinates: 39.0708°N 94.5905°W

- Landmark Legal Foundation / The Ronald Reagan Legal Center
- Predecessor: Great Plains Legal Foundation; Great Plains and Gulf States Legal Foundation
- Formation: 1976; 50 years ago
- Type: 501(c)(3) nonprofit organization
- Tax ID no.: 51-0203802
- Purpose: Public interest advocacy and education
- Headquarters: 3100 Broadway Blvd, Suite 1210, Kansas City, Missouri, US Suite 312, Leesburg, Virginia, US
- Region served: United States
- Services: U.S. Constitution issues litigation and public education about U.S. constitutional history, interpretation, and issues, the role of the judiciary, governmental integrity issues, and founding principles including through FOIA requests, media, and public records investigations
- President & General Counsel: Richard P. (Pete) Hutchison
- Vice President of Legal Affairs: Michael J. O'Neill
- Executive Vice President: Matthew C. Forys
- Development Manager: Joshua C. Frey
- Board of directors: Mark R.Levin; John N. Richardson, Jr.; Edwin Meese III; Lawrence Davenport
- Revenue: $3,635,319 (2023)
- Expenses: $1,741,631 (2023)
- Funding: Contributions (93.1%) Investment Income (6.9%)
- Endowment: $13,464,458 (2023)
- Website: www.landmarklegal.org

The Landmark Legal Foundation is an American 501(c)(3) nonprofit conservative legal advocacy and education foundation. The president as of 2025 is Richard P. Hutchison. Through litigation and direct interfacing with government agencies, Landmark Legal advances a conservative platform of limited government, a key concept in the history of liberalism, protecting individual rights, defending free enterprise, and exposing teachers' union fraud. It has litigated a number of cases up to and before the US Supreme Court.

== History ==
Landmark was founded in 1976 as an offshoot of the National Legal Center for the Public Interest with its focus on protecting individual rights, challenging the scope and authority of government, defending free enterprise, and exposing teachers' union fraud. Landmark has made efforts to scale back funding for non-profits which it holds to be political in nature but list no political expenditures on tax forms. The National Education Association has often been the subject of complaints to the IRS made by Landmark Legal. Throughout its history Landmark Legal Foundation has filed lawsuits against labor unions and has fought for legislation that would allow parents to direct public education funding toward their children's private schools, homeschooling, or school of choice.

In 1990, Landmark was involved in a civil rights court case when it questioned the legality of taxes to pay for the effect of segregation in Kansas City; the case went to the Supreme Court, which decided the taxes were legal.

During the presidency of Bill Clinton, Landmark Legal unsuccessfully requested an independent counsel to investigate the role of Vice President Al Gore with an event hosted at a California Buddhist temple that was at the center of the 1996 United States campaign finance controversy. Landmark also filed a lawsuit against the Internal Revenue Service (IRS) that alleged that the IRS targeted conservative groups for audits at the request of government officials. When the impeachment of Bill Clinton began, Landmark Legal actively played a role in scrutinizing government actions. In 1998, Landmark called for a federal probe about ties between the website Salon.com and Justice Department officials that the foundation accused of illegally leaking information; Levin called Salon "a mouthpiece for the [Clinton] administration." A federal appeals court rejected a request by Landmark Legal in 1999 to block a Justice Department investigation of special counsel Ken Starr for alleged misconduct in the impeachment inquiry.

In 2000, Landmark Legal filed a complaint with the Federal Election Commission alleging that the National Education Association, the largest teachers' union in the U.S., did not disclose spending on political activity in Internal Revenue Service documentation. Landmark Legal also filed similar complaints with the United States Department of Labor in 2002 regarding NEA and political activity; by 2006, the NEA and smaller American Federation of Teachers had filed new documents with the Labor Department revealing over $100 million combined in political action spending.

In 2007 the Landmark Legal Foundation nominated commentator Rush Limbaugh, who sat as an unpaid member of its advisory board, for a Nobel Peace Prize.

In 2016, the director of Penn State Earth System Science Center, climatologist Michael E. Mann, named Landmark as part of an alleged smear campaign against him after his testimony on the C-SPAN TV network about the threat of human-caused climate change.

In 2015, a federal judge found that the Environmental Protection Agency had handled Landmark's 2012 Freedom of Information Act request in a "suspicious" manner, but the judge did not impose sanctions because Landmark had not established that the EPA acted in bad faith.

Supreme Court of Arizona Justice Clint Bolick has worked for the foundation. Former Whitewater controversy special investigator Kenneth Starr has also worked with Landmark. Former U.S. attorney general and counselor to President Reagan Edwin Meese is currently the Second Vice Chairman of Landmark Legal Foundation.

== Leadership and staff ==
Kansas City attorney Jerald L. Hill served as president of Landmark Legal from 1985 to 1997. From 1997 to 2018, Mark Levin served as president. Since 2018, attorney Pete Hutchison has been president of Landmark Legal.

A former White House official during the presidency of Ronald Reagan, Levin joined Landmark in 1991 and previously served as director of legal policy and the foundation's Washington-based Center for Civil Rights before becoming president. In 2001 the American Conservative Union awarded Levin its Ronald Reagan Award for his work with Landmark Legal. Levin would go on to become a bestselling author and host of the nationally syndicated talk radio program The Mark Levin Show and Fox News Channel program Life, Liberty & Levin; after stepping down as president, he continues to serve Landmark Legal as a member of its board of directors.

After serving in the Equal Employment Opportunity Commission under Clarence Thomas, Clint Bolick served as the director of Landmark Legal's Center for Civil Rights from 1988 to 1991. In seeking an alternative to affirmative action, Bolick advocated that "the conservative cause on civil rights was better served by identifying blacks, not whites, as its beneficiaries," wrote Steven Teles in 2008. Bolick went on to become co-founding vice president at the Institute for Justice and Associate Justice of the Arizona Supreme Court.

Former U.S. Attorney General Edwin Meese also serves on the board of directors. The foundation's advisory board includes Hillsdale College president Larry P. Arnn and syndicated columnist and George Mason University economics professor Walter E. Williams.

== Organization and funding ==
The Landmark Legal Foundation is a 501(c)(3) non-profit organization. As of 2017, Landmark Legal had an annual budget of nearly $1.6 million, with nearly 99 percent of funding coming from charitable contributions. Landmark Legal does not accept government funding.

In the 1990s, Richard Mellon Scaife was a major donor to Landmark Legal. Scaife gave $525,000 to Landmark Legal in 1997. The Coors brewing family of Colorado has also donated to Landmark Legal. Billionaire businessman Timothy Mellon supported Landmark Legal; in 2016, he offered donations to the Foundation for each download of his autobiography.
