= John Sandford (novelist) =

American novelist and journalist (born 1944)

- Born: John Roswell Camp; February 23, 1944 (age 82); Cedar Rapids, Iowa, U.S.
- Education: University of Iowa
- Occupations: Journalist, novelist
- Notable work: Gathering Prey
- Awards: Pulitzer Prize

John Roswell Camp (born February 23, 1944), known professionally as John Sandford, is an American New York Times best-selling author, novelist, former journalist, and recipient of the Pulitzer Prize.

== Early life ==
Camp was born in Cedar Rapids, Iowa, the son of Anne Agnes (Barron) and Roswell Sandford Camp. He graduated from Cedar Rapids Washington High School in 1962. He received a bachelor's degree in American history and literature and a master's in journalism, both from the University of Iowa.

== Career ==
From 1971 to 1978, Camp wrote for The Miami Herald. In 1978, he moved to Saint Paul, Minnesota and started writing for The Saint Paul Pioneer Press as a general assignment reporter; in 1980, he became a daily columnist. That year, he was a Pulitzer finalist for a series of stories on Native American culture. In 1985, during the Midwest farm crisis, he wrote a series titled "Life on the Land: an American Farm Family," which followed a typical southwest Minnesota farm family through the course of a full year. For that work, he won the annual Pulitzer Prize for Feature Writing and the American Society of Newspaper Editors award for Non-Deadline Feature Writing. While working at the Pioneer Press, he wrote two non-fiction books, "The Eye and the Heart: The Watercolors of John Stuart Ingle" and "Plastic Surgery: The Kindest Cut," with University of Minnesota surgeon Bruce Cunningham. He worked part-time at the Pioneer Press in 1989 and left the following year.

== Fiction writer ==
In 1989, Camp wrote two novels that would each spawn a popular series. The Fool's Run (Kidd series) was published under his own name, but the publisher asked him to provide a pseudonym for Rules of Prey (Prey series), so it was published under the name John Sandford. After the Prey series proved to be more popular, with its charismatic protagonist Lucas Davenport, The Fool's Run and all of its sequels were published under John Sandford.

In 2007, Camp started a third series (also under the name John Sandford), featuring Virgil Flowers, who is a supporting character in some of the Prey novels, including Invisible Prey and Storm Prey.

A fourth series, featuring Letty Davenport, daughter of Lucas Davenport of the Prey series, was launched in 2022.

All of Camp's novels have appeared, in one format or another, on The New York Times bestseller list. Twenty-eight have debuted at #1 on the “Hardcover” or “Combined” lists.

Camp is an avid fiction reader himself. When asked in 2018, "What's your favorite book of all time?" by The New York Times, he responded: "An impossible question. If you put a gun to my head—say a .40-caliber Walther PPQ, or maybe a .45 ACP Colt Gold Cup—I'd say The Once and Future King by T. H. White." Both weapons he mentioned make appearances in many of his novels.

Camp is a personal friend and hunting companion of fellow Minnesota author Chuck Logan.

== Published works ==
=== Prey series ===
Lucas Davenport is the protagonist of the Prey series. In the first three novels, he is a maverick detective with the Minneapolis Police Department. At the end of Eyes of Prey, he's forced to resign to avoid excessive force charges, partly due to his knowledge of the connection of a senior police officer to that case. He returns in Night Prey as a deputy chief (a political appointment), running his own intelligence unit. Beginning with Naked Prey, Davenport is an investigator for the Minnesota Department of Public Safety's Bureau of Criminal Apprehension (BCA), acting occasionally as a special troubleshooter for the governor of Minnesota in politically sensitive cases. He serves in that capacity through Gathering Prey, at the end of which he quits working for the BCA, later becoming a United States Marshal.

The novel Mind Prey was sold for an ABC TV movie, and Davenport was portrayed by Eriq LaSalle. Another of the novels, Certain Prey, was adapted into a movie in 2011 by USA Network, starring Mark Harmon as Davenport. A television series, titled Rules of Prey, was ordered by MGM+, starring Jensen Ackles as Davenport.

1. Rules of Prey (1989) ISBN 0-399-13465-4
2. Shadow Prey (1990) ISBN 0-399-13543-X
3. Eyes of Prey (1991) ISBN 0-399-13629-0
4. Silent Prey (1992) ISBN 0-399-13742-4
5. Winter Prey (1993) ISBN 0-399-13815-3
6. Night Prey (1994) ISBN 0-399-13914-1
7. Mind Prey (1995) ISBN 0-399-14009-3
8. Sudden Prey (1996) ISBN 0-399-14138-3
9. Secret Prey (1998) ISBN 0-399-14382-3
10. Certain Prey (1999) ISBN 0-399-14496-X
11. Easy Prey (2000) ISBN 0-399-14613-X
12. Chosen Prey (2001) ISBN 0-399-14728-4
13. Mortal Prey (2002) ISBN 0-399-14863-9
14. Naked Prey (2003) ISBN 0-399-15043-9
15. Hidden Prey (2004) ISBN 0-399-15180-X
16. Broken Prey (2005) ISBN 0-399-15272-5
17. Invisible Prey (2007) ISBN 978-0-399-15421-8
18. Phantom Prey (2008) ISBN 978-0-399-15500-0
19. Wicked Prey (2009) ISBN 0-399-15567-8
20. Storm Prey (2010) ISBN 0-399-15649-6
21. Buried Prey (2011) ISBN 0-399-15738-7
22. Stolen Prey (2012) ISBN 0-399-15768-9
23. Silken Prey (2013) ISBN 0-399-15931-2
24. Field of Prey (2014) ISBN 0-399-16238-0
25. Gathering Prey (2015) ISBN 0-399-16879-6
26. Extreme Prey (2016) ISBN 978-0-399-17605-0
27. Golden Prey (2017) ISBN 0-399-18457-0
28. Twisted Prey (2018) ISBN 0-73521735-1
29. Neon Prey (2019) ISBN 978-0525536581
30. Masked Prey (2020) ISBN 978-0525539520
31. Ocean Prey (2021) ISBN 978-0593087022
32. Righteous Prey (2022) ISBN 978-0593422472
33. Judgment Prey (October 3, 2023) ISBN 978-0593542811
34. Toxic Prey (April 9, 2024) ISBN 978-0593714492
35. Lethal Prey (March 25, 2025) ISBN 978-0593718407
36. Revenge Prey (April 7, 2026) ISBN 978-0593852064

From Ocean Prey (#31) on, the lead in the Prey books has been shared: Lucas Davenport and Virgil Flowers in Ocean Prey, Righteous Prey, Judgment Prey, and Lethal Prey; Lucas Davenport and Letty Davenport in Toxic Prey.

=== Kidd series ===
1. The Fool's Run (1989), by John Camp; reissued 1996 as by Sandford ISBN 0-8050-0990-6
2. The Empress File (1991), by John Camp; reissued 1995 as by Sandford ISBN 0-8050-1545-0
3. The Devil's Code (2000) ISBN 0-399-14650-4
4. The Hanged Man's Song (2003) ISBN 0-399-15139-7

Kidd also has a prominent role in Silken Prey (Prey series #23) and Extreme Prey (Prey series #26).

=== Virgil Flowers series ===
The protagonist of the series, Virgil Flowers, is described as tall, lean, late thirties, three times divorced, with long hair and often wearing t-shirts featuring rock bands. Virgil works at the Minnesota Bureau of Criminal Apprehension (BCA). Prior to the BCA he was in the Army and the military police, then the police in Saint Paul. Lucas Davenport, main character of the Prey series of books, recruited him into the BCA. Virgil is an avid outdoorsman who loves fishing and is often towing his boat, even when on duty. He is also a writer for outdoor and hunting magazines as well as a photographer.

1. Dark of the Moon (2007)
2. Heat Lightning (2008)
3. Rough Country (2009)
4. Bad Blood (2010)
5. Shock Wave (2011)
6. Mad River (2012)
7. Storm Front (2013)
8. Deadline (2014)
9. Escape Clause (2016)
10. Deep Freeze (2017)
11. Holy Ghost (2018)
12. Bloody Genius (2019)

Virgil Flowers also has a prominent role in Ocean Prey (Prey series #31), Righteous Prey (Prey series #32), Judgment Prey (Prey series #33), and Lethal Prey (Prey series #35).

=== Singular Menace series (with Michele Cook) ===
1. Uncaged (2014) ISBN 0-385-75306-3
2. Outrage (2015) ISBN 0-385-75309-8
3. Rampage (2016) ISBN 0-385-75313-6

=== Letty Davenport series ===
Featuring Letty Davenport, daughter of Lucas Davenport of the Prey series

1. The Investigator (2022) ISBN 978-0593328682
2. Dark Angel (2023) ISBN 978-0593422410

Letty Davenport also has a prominent role in Toxic Prey (Prey series #34).

=== Other fiction books ===
- The Night Crew (1997) ISBN 0-399-14237-1
- Dead Watch (2006) ISBN 0-399-15354-3
- Saturn Run (with Ctein) science fiction (2015) ISBN 9780399176951; 0-399-17695-0

=== Short stories ===
- "Lucy Had a List." Published in Murder in the Rough: Original Tales of Bad Shots, Terrible Lies, and Other Deadly Handicaps from Today's Great Writers (2006), a short story anthology by notable authors, the fourth title in the sports mystery series edited by Otto Penzler. ISBN 0-89296-017-5
- "Rhymes with Prey," co-written with Jeffery Deaver. Published in FaceOff (2014), a short-story anthology edited by David Baldacci, pitting famous thriller authors against each other. ISBN 978-1-4767-6206-7
- "Deserves to be Dead," co-written with Lisa Jackson. Published in MatchUp (2017), a short-story anthology edited by Lee Child, pairing male and female thriller writers. ISBN 978-1-5011-4159-1

=== Nonfiction books ===
- The Eye and the Heart (1988) ISBN 0-8478-0888-2
- Plastic Surgery (1989) ISBN 0-8050-0897-7

== Awards and nominations ==
- 1980, Pulitzer Prize Nomination. Series of articles on Native Americans. St Paul Pioneer Press Dispatch
- 1986 Distinguished Writing Award. American Society of Newspaper Editors.
- 1986, Pulitzer Prize for Feature. Series of articles on Farming Family. Pioneer Press Dispatch
- 2019, "Thrillermaster" at Thrillerfest 2019. International Thriller Writers (ITW).
