= American Marxism =

2021 book by Mark Levin

- Author: Mark Levin
- Publisher: Mark Levin
- English publication date: 2021
- ISBN: 978-1637839720

American Marxism is a 2021 book by Mark Levin, a conservative radio host in the United States. The book is a New York Times bestseller and sold 700,000 in its first three weeks of publication. The book was also released in Spanish a year later.

== Summary ==
In the book American Marxism, Mark Levin discusses how the main ideas of Marxism have become very common in American society. He argues that these ideas can be seen in various aspects of our culture, like our schools, media, and even in our politics, often disguised using terms like "progressivism", "democratic socialism", or "social activism". Levin delves into the psychology and strategies behind these movements. He also explores how students are often influenced by these ideas, the controversial aspects of things like Critical Race Theory and the Green New Deal, and what he argues are the growing efforts to suppress and silence opposing viewpoints in order to make everyone conform. Levin claims to shine a light on the institutions, thinkers, academics, and activists who are leading these changes in American society, and he offers some suggestions and ideas on how to respond to them.
