= Larry P. Arnn =

American educator and writer (born 1952)

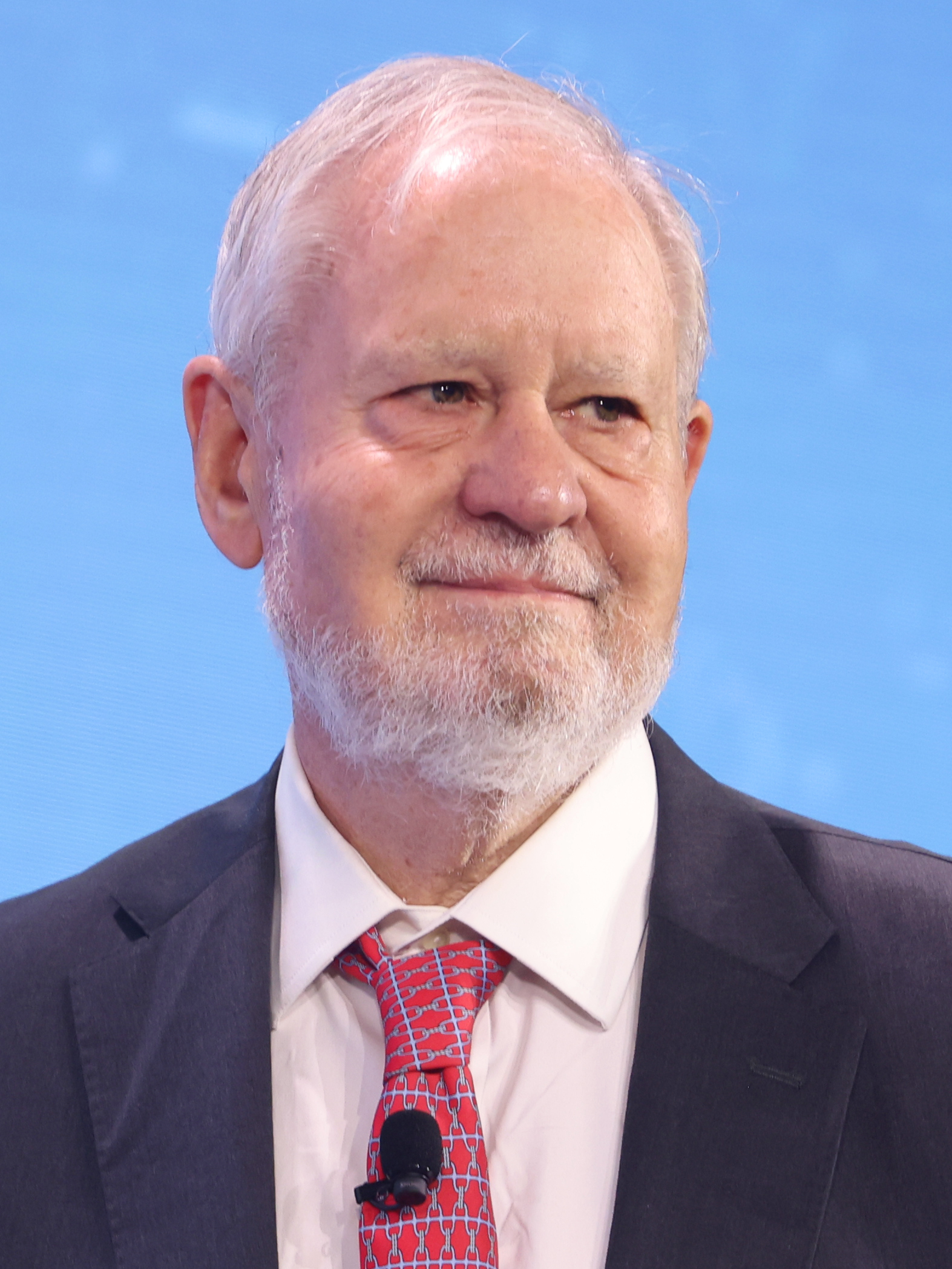
- Arnn in 2026

12th President of Hillsdale College
- Incumbent
- Assumed office May 2000
- Preceded by: George Roche III

Personal details
- Born: Larry Paul Arnn; October 8, 1952 (age 73) Pocahontas, Arkansas, U.S.
- Education: Arkansas State University (BA); London School of Economics; Worcester College, Oxford; Claremont Graduate School (MA, PhD)
- Awards: Bradley Prize (2015)

Larry Paul Arnn (born October 8, 1952) is an American educator and academic. He has served as the twelfth president of private Hillsdale College in Hillsdale, Michigan, since May 2000.

== Early life and education ==
Arnn was born October 8, 1952, in Pocahontas, Arkansas. He attended Arkansas State University in Jonesboro, where he received a B.A. degree in political science and accounting in 1974. He earned two graduate degrees in government from Claremont Graduate School: an M.A. degree in government in 1976 and a Ph.D. degree in government in 1985. From 1977 to 1980, Arnn studied international history at the London School of Economics and then modern history at Worcester College, Oxford.

As a graduate student in England, Arnn was the research director for Sir Martin Gilbert, the official biographer of Winston Churchill, editing the final six document volumes of the Churchill biography.

== Career ==
In 1980, Arnn became an editor for Public Research, Syndicated in the U.S. He was one of four founders of the Claremont Institute in Claremont, California, and served as its president from 1985 to 2000. In 2000, he was named the 12th president of Hillsdale College. In 2001, he committed to raising $400 million for the college's Founders Campaign. Since becoming the college's president, several new buildings have been built on the campus.

In 2002, Arnn was appointed a trustee at The Heritage Foundation. In 2012, the foundation offered its presidency to him, but he instead opted to remain in academia and the foundation instead hired Jim DeMint, a U.S. Senator from South Carolina, as its president.

Arnn is a member of the board of directors of the Henry Salvatori Center for the Study of Individual Freedom in the Modern World at Claremont McKenna College in Claremont, the Center for Individual Rights in Washington, D.C., the Claremont Institute, and a member of the board of advisors of the Landmark Legal Foundation. He is a member of the Mont Pelerin Society in Lubbock, Texas; the Churchill Centre in Washington D.C., and the Philanthropy Roundtable in D.C. As of 2014, he was listed as a member of the Council for National Policy also in Washington D.C.

In December 2020, he was appointed chair of the 1776 Commission, an advisory committee on patriotic education, but the commission was immediately terminated by President Joe Biden on the first day of his presidency.

== Views ==
Arnn is a political conservative who has been influenced by the Leo Strauss' thinking and Strauss' student, Harry V. Jaffa. Discussing politics at Hillsdale, Arnn said, "If you take the reading of an old book seriously on the view that it's valuable, you have already discarded the modern Left." Arnn supported Donald Trump for president in the 2016 United States presidential election.

== Controversies ==
=== Comments about Common Core ===
In 2013, Arnn was criticized for his remarks about ethnic minorities when he testified before the Michigan State Legislature. In testimony against Common Core's curriculum standards, he expressed concern about government interference with educational institutions. He recalled that shortly after he assumed the presidency at Hillsdale, he received a letter from the State Department of Education that said his college "violated the standards for diversity," adding, "because we didn't have enough dark ones, I guess, is what they meant."

After being criticized for calling minorities "dark ones", he explained that he was referring to "dark faces", saying: "The State of Michigan sent a group of people down to my campus, with clipboards... to look at the colors of people's faces and write down what they saw. We don't keep records of that information. What were they looking for besides dark ones?"

Michigan House Democratic Leader Tim Greimel condemned Arnn for his comments, which he called "offensive" and "inflammatory and bigoted", and asked for an apology. The college released a statement reiterating Arnn's concern about "state sponsored racism" in the form of affirmative action policies, saying Arnn was "sorry" if "offense was honestly taken" and that none was intended except to "the offending bureaucrats".

=== Comments about teachers ===
In July 2022, as an education advisor to Tennessee Governor Bill Lee, Arnn remarked:

The teachers are trained in the dumbest parts of the dumbest colleges in the country... You will see how education destroys generations of people. It's devastating. It's like the plague... We are going to try to demonstrate that you don't have to be an expert to educate a child because basically anybody can do it.

While his address was condemned by individuals in both of Tennessee's main political parties, Governor Lee refused to condemn Arnn's statement, but attempted to clarify them, saying that Arnn was only talking about "left-wing" teachers.

== Personal life ==
Arnn and his wife Penny, who is British, married in 1979. They moved to California, where they had three children and adopted a fourth. They moved to Michigan in 2000, when Arnn succeeded George Roche as president of Hillsdale College. Arnn's father-in-law was Colonel Denis Arthur Sydenham Houghton, who was once the High Sheriff of Lancashire.

== Selected publications ==
- Liberty and Learning: The Evolution of American Education (2004) ISBN 0 91630800 6 ISBN 978 0 91630800 1
- The Founders' Key: The Divine and Natural Connection Between the Declaration and the Constitution and What We Risk by Losing It (2012) ISBN 1 59555472 6 ISBN 978 1 59555472 7
- "Churchill's Trial: Winston Churchill and the Salvation of Free Government" (2015) ISBN 1 59555472 6 ISBN 978 1 59555472 7
