= Betrone =

Betrone is an Italian surname. Notable people with this surname include:

- Annibale Betrone (1883–1950), Italian stage and film actor
- Consolata Betrone (1903–1946), Italian mystic
- Elvira Betrone (1881–1961), Italian actress of stage, film, radio, and television
