= Capuche =

Hood worn by many Catholic monks

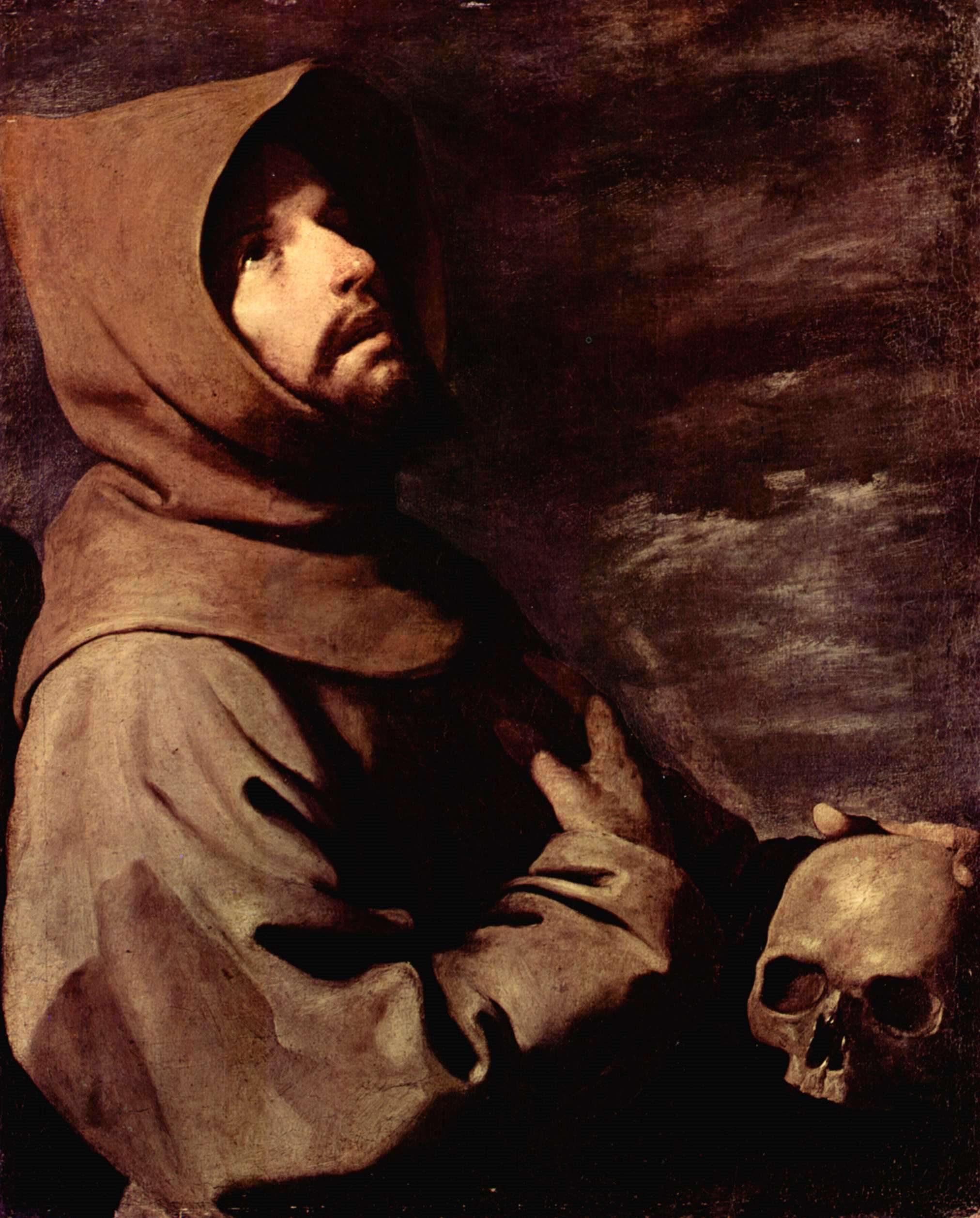

A Capuche (also almuce) is a friar's cowl, a long, pointed hood which was typically worn by the Franciscan, Capuchin, Augustinian, Carmelite, or Cistercian monks.

The name, which is now the French word for "hood", is of Middle French origin, derived from the Italian word cappuccio and the Late Latin word cappa, meaning cloak. The Capuchins in turn were named after the capuche, a name which Richard Viladesau states was a tribute to the Camaldolese monks who gave early refuge to Matteo da Bascio, founder of the Capuchin Franciscans in the 1520s.

An elongated hood worn by friars was originally denoted as a symbol of punishment or shame. Indeed, there are testaments of the capuche being given to paupers or thrown into fires during the time of Francis of Assisi. In Medieval Spain, Muslims were forced to wear bright yellow capuches with a blue moon on the right shoulder and to live in enclosures (morerías) to chasten them for not being Christian.

The negative connotation associated with capuches appears to have been rescinded under St Bonaventure, who served as Minister General from 1257 to 1274. Bonaventure paid scrupulous attention to the uniforms of friars, issuing a decree which made friars more discernible from the Umbrian peasants. Bonaventure's decree made it obligatory for the backs of capuches to be pointed and rounded at the front, with a round cowl marginally large enough to cover the head. His reform concerning capuches effectively removed the stigma which had been attached to them among Franciscans.

A black capuche was typically worn daily while a white one was much fuller and often reserved for ceremonial occasions. Capuchin friars once were grey but later a brown cloak with capuche and sandals had become the norm. The Cistercians wore a close-fitting cuculla talare with a capuche worn over the tunic. The Caeremoniae of Bursfelde in the latter half of the fifteenth century issued two different tunics, a scapular with a capuche for work purposes and a floccus, a sleeveless cuculla worn at night.
