= Capuchin Poor Clares =

Catholic religious order

- Latin: Ordo Sanctae Clarae Capuccinarum
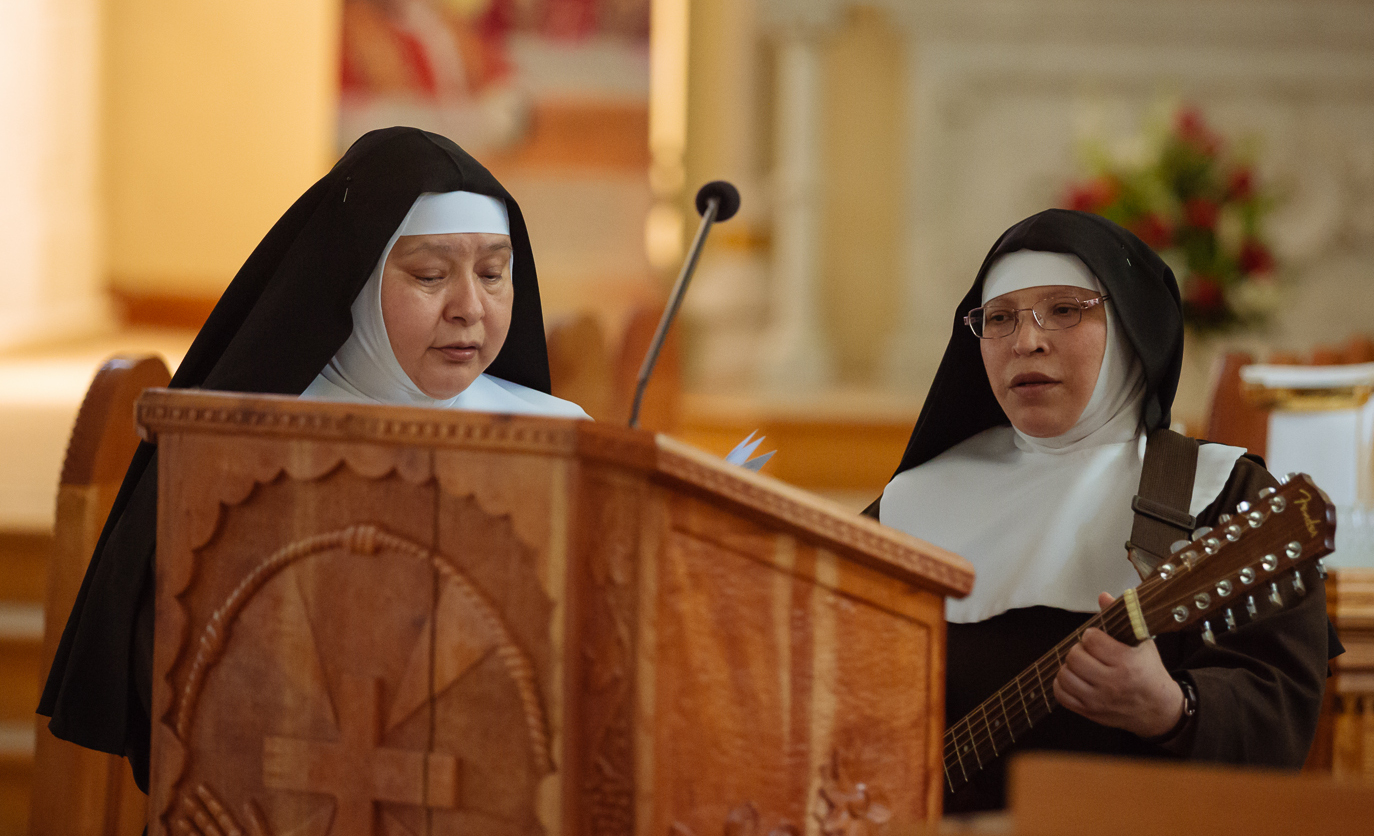
- Abbreviation: O.S.C. Cap.
- Nickname: Capuchinesses
- Formation: 1538; 488 years ago
- Founder: Blessed Maria Lorenza Longo, O.S.C. Cap.
- Founded at: Paris, France; formalised in Rome
- Type: Religious Order of Pontifical Right for Women
- Region served: Western Europe; Central and Eastern Europe; Asia and Oceania; North America; South America
- Members: 1,692 members as of 2020
- Main organ: Pax et Bonum
- Parent organization: Catholic Church
- Website: www.cloisteredlife.com

The Capuchin Poor Clares (Latin: Ordo Sanctae Clarae Capuccinarum) is a Catholic religious order of Pontifical Right for women founded in Naples, Italy, in 1538, by Blessed Maria Lorenza Longo. The order still exists and it now has communities in the United States. Members are referred to as Capuchinesses.

== History ==
Maria Lorenza Longo had built a hospital and house that cared for prostitutes. The first community of nuns was formed in 1538, organised by priests from the Theatine order. (The Theatines had been formed fourteen years earlier.) This new body was soon organised not by the Theatines but by the Order of Friars Minor Capuchin, usually known as Capuchins. The Capuchin Poor Clares follow the original ideals of St. Francis of Assisi and St. Clare of Assisi. The Capuchin Poor Clares are a cloistered community of contemplative religious sisters. Longo wanted to re-establish the original concepts of religious simplicity, selfless poverty and the austerity of St. Francis of Assisi and St. Clare of Assisi set by Matteo da Bascio when he founded the order of the Capuchin friars. Longo's new order took the same habit design as the men. Like the friars, the nuns wear a simple brown tunic knotted with a cord at the waist and a short cape. The only addition for nuns was a wimple and a black veil.

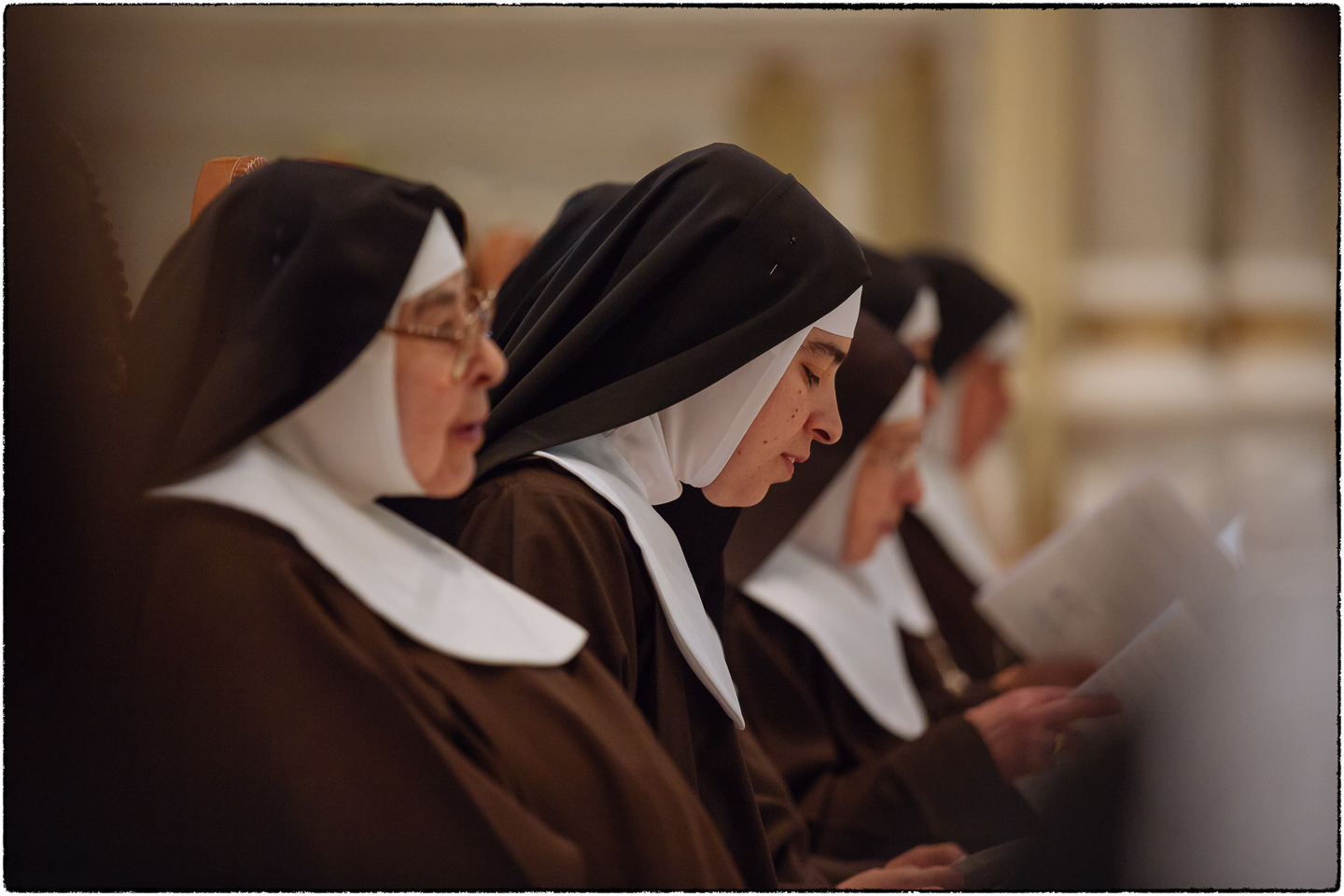
Brown habit, black veil, white wimple

A notable member of the order was Saint Veronica Giuliani who joined the order in Città di Castello in Italy in 1677. She rose to be a mystic and abbess, and in 1839 she was canonised by Pope Gregory XVI.

== In America ==
In the United States, the Capuchin Poor Clares have monasteries in Wilmington, Delaware, Amarillo, Texas, Alamo, Texas, Denver, Colorado, and Pueblo, Colorado.

At Our Lady of Light Monastery in Denver there are nine professed sisters. The monastery in Denver was founded by Capuchin Poor Clare sisters from Irapuato in central Mexico in 1988. In addition to sewing habits, the sisters provide for the needs of their community by making and selling cookies.

== Saints, Blesseds, and other holy people ==
Saints

- Veronica (Orsola) Giuliani (27 December 1660—9 July 1727), mystic, canonized on 26 May 1839.

Blesseds

- Maria Llorença Llong (Maria Lorenza Longo) (c. 1463 – 21 December 1539), founder of the Order, beatified on 9 October 2021.
- Maria Angela (Maria Ines Jerónima) Astorch (1 September 1592 – 2 December 1665), founder of the Order in Zaragoza and Murcia, beatified on 23 May 1982.
- Maria Maddalena (Margherita) Martinengo (5 October 1687 – 27 July 1737), professed religious, beatified on 3 June 1900.
- Lucrezia Elena (Florida) Cevoli (11 November 1685 – 12 June 1767), abbess, beatified on 16 May 1993.
- María Vicenta (María Jesús) Masiá Ferragud and 4 Companions (died between 25 October 1936 to 13 April 1937), Martyrs of the Spanish Civil War, beatified on 11 March 2001.
- Maria Teresa of the Child Jesus (Maria Teresa Kowalska) (c. 1902 - 25 July 1941), Martyr of the Nazi Occupation of Poland during the Second World War, beatified on 13 June 1999.
- Maria Costanza (Agnese Pacifica) Panas (5 January 1896 - 28 May 1963), professed religious, beatified on 9 October 2022.

Venerables

- Clemenza Adelaide (Maria Francesca) Cesira Ticchi (23 April 1887 - 20 June 1922), professed religious, declared Venerable on 23 November 2020

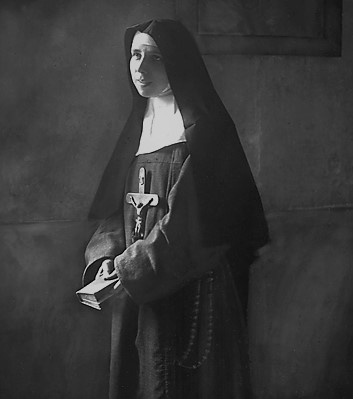
Sister Consolata Betrone was one of the great mystics of the Capuchin Order

- Maria Consolata Betrone (Pierina Lorenzina Giovanna) (6 April 1903 - 18 July 1946), professed religious, declared Venerable on 6 April 2019
- Maria Chiara of Saint Therese of the Child Jesus (Vincenza Damato) (11 November 1909 - 9 March 1948), professed religious, declared Venerable on 2 April 2011

Servants of God

- Àngela Margarida Prat (Àngela Serafina) (26 October 1543 - 24 December 1608), professed religious
- Úrsula Jerónima (Úrsula Micaela) Morata Iscayo Garibaldo (21 October 1628 - 9 January 1703), professed religious, declared as a Servant of God on 11 September 2006
- Maria Lanceata Morelli (Maria Vittoria) (c. 1704 - 26 August 1762), professed religious, declared as a Servant of God on 6 November 2002
- Maria Diomira of the Incarnate Word (Maria Teresa Serri) (23 February 1708 - 14 January 1768), professed religious
- Maria Teresa (Maria Raffaela) Coppola (26 February 1883 - 4 October 1922), professed religious, declared as a Servant of God on 28 January 2014

== Other notable people ==
- Inés de Guerrico Eguses (Sor María Jacinta; 1793–1840), nun, writer
