= James Howard Brown =

American professor of bacteriology

James Howard Brown (May 18, 1884, Jacksonville, Illinois – February 10, 1956, Baltimore, Maryland) was an American professor of bacteriology. He was the president of the American Society for Microbiology in 1931.

== Biography ==
J. Howard Brown graduated in 1906 with a B.S. from Illinois College and in 1909 with an M.S. from the University of Illinois Urbana-Champaign. In the department of comparative pathology of Harvard Medical School, he was from 1910 to 1917 an assistant and an Austin teaching fellow. In 1917 he received his Ph.D. in comparative pathology from Harvard University. In the department of animal pathology of the Rockefeller Institute for Medical Research, he was from 1917 to 1919 an assistant and from 1919 to 1923 an associate. At Harvard and at the Rockefeller Institute, Theobald Smith was his mentor. During WW I, Brown was a civilian in charge of production, at the Army Auxiliary Laboratory Number One, of immune serum for the U.S. Army and U.S. Navy. In 1923 he joined the faculty in the department of pathology and bacteriology of the Johns Hopkins School of Medicine and continued there for the remainder of his career. He was the author or co-author of over 100 scientific publications.

J. Howard Brown is best known for his pioneering work on the biochemical characterization and differentiation of the streptococci, but he also did research on many other bacteria. He did research on blood transfusion, nephritis, pertussis, the preservation of bacteria in vacuo by freeze drying, and development of devices for culturing bacteria. In 1926 he was elected the president of the American Association of Medical Milk Commissions. He, with William Dodge Frost and Myrtle Shaw, developed methods of culturing bacteria to differentiate between streptococci of bovine and human origin.

In 1929 Illinois College awarded him an honorary Doctor of Science degree. In 1933 he was elected a Fellow of the American Association for the Advancement of Science. The Maryland Branch of the American Society for Microbiology established in his honor the J. Howard Brown award, given annually to Maryland's outstanding graduate student bacteriologist.

In 1910 he married Dessau Duncan (1886–1974). They had two children, Thomas Duncan Brown (1911–1946) and Hazel Anne Brown (1919–2009).

== Selected publications ==
=== Articles ===
- Brown, J. Howard; Orcutt, Marion L. (1918). "A Rapid Differential Method for the Isolation of Bacillus Influenzae". The Journal of Experimental Medicine. 28 (5): 659–662. doi:10.1084/jem.28.5.659. PMC 2126301. PMID 19868285.
- —— (1926). "Vacuum Tubes for the Storage and Shipment of Bacteria". Science. 64 (1661): 429–430. Bibcode:1926Sci....64..429B. doi:10.1126/science.64.1661.429. PMID 17830858.
- —— (1926). "Bacillus bronchisepticus infection in a child with symptoms of pertussis". Bulletin of the Johns Hopkins Hospital. 38: 147–153.
- —— (1927). "A New Device for Filing Microscope Slides". Science. 65 (1690): 501–502. doi:10.1126/science.65.1690.501.b. PMID 17806535. S2CID 239870612.
- —— (1932). "The Biological Approach to Bacteriology". Journal of Bacteriology. 23 (1): 1–10. doi:10.1128/jb.23.1.1-10.1932. PMC 533297. PMID 16559532.
- Rich, Arnold R.; Long, Perrin H.; ——; Bliss, Eleanor A.; Holt, L. Emmett (1932). "Experiments Upon the Cause of Whooping Cough". Science. 76 (1971): 330–331. Bibcode:1932Sci....76..330R. doi:10.1126/science.76.1971.330. PMID 17799572.
- —— (1933). "The streptococci of milk with special reference to human health". Cornell Veterinarian. 23 (2): 110–116. reprint in The Veterinary Bulletin; abstract
- —— (1938). "A Simplified Method for Grouping Hemolytic Streptococci by the Precipitin Reaction". Journal of the American Medical Association. 111 (4): 310. doi:10.1001/jama.1938.72790300001007.
- —— (1948). "Media Prepared by the Pancreatic Digestion of Meat". Journal of Bacteriology. 55 (6): 871–872. doi:10.1128/jb.55.6.871-872.1948. PMC 518532. PMID 18863620. S2CID 34552104.
- ——; Koch, Marie L. (1949). "A Transparent Agar Medium for Growing Neisseria Gonorrhoeae". Journal of Bacteriology. 57 (5): 574. doi:10.1128/jb.57.5.574-574.1949. PMC 385562. PMID 16561736.

=== Books and monographs ===
- Brown, James Howard (1919). The Use of Blood Agar for the Study of Streptococci.
