= Eleanor Albert Bliss =

American bacteriologist

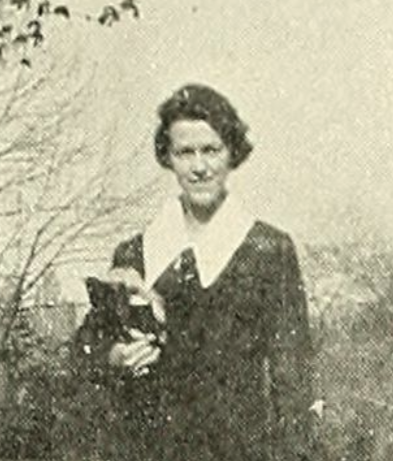
- Bliss in 1921
- Born: December 16, 1899; Jamestown, Rhode Island
- Died: June 27, 1987 (aged 87); Bryn Mawr, Pennsylvania
- Resting place: Baltimore, Maryland
- Education: Bryn Mawr College, Johns Hopkins University
- Known for: Classification of Lancefield Group F. Pioneering work with sulfanilamide and its derivatives.
- Scientific career
- Fields: Bacteriologist
- Workplaces: Johns Hopkins University, Bryn Mawr College

Eleanor Albert Bliss (December 16, 1899 – June 27, 1987) was an immunologist who made significant advancements to the field of immunological research. She was also a dean and professor of biology at Bryn Mawr College.

== Life and education ==
Eleanor Albert Bliss was born on December 16, 1899, in Jamestown, Rhode Island. Her family lived in Baltimore where her father, William J. Bliss (1867-1940) was a professor at Johns Hopkins University. Her mother's name was Edith Grantham Bliss (1870-1967) who was originally from Pennsylvania. The Bliss family lived in Baltimore for their children's entire childhood.

Eleanor Bliss left Baltimore and received her undergraduate degree from Bryn Mawr College in 1921. While attending Bryn Mawr, she was a member of the swim team and water polo team. After graduating, she traveled throughout Europe for a year visiting England, France, Italy, Germany, Switzerland, Belgium, Holland, and Austria. After this year of traveling, she returned to Baltimore to pursue a PhD from Johns Hopkins. After completing this degree in 1925, she joined their staff as a fellow. She worked closely during this time with sulfa drugs (or sulfonamide) making significant advancements to the field of immunological research which will be discussed further below.

She worked at Johns Hopkins until 1952, when she returned to Bryn Mawr as the graduate dean and a professor of biology. She worked in that capacity until her retirement in 1966. She died in Bryn Mawr, Pennsylvania, on June 27, 1987, and was buried in her family plot in Baltimore.

== Scientific contributions ==
=== Lancefield group F ===
One of her earlier contributions to the field of immunology was her isolation of a minute beta hemolytic streptococci in 1934. This would later be classified within the Lancefield group of streptococcus as “Group F”. This was connected to work being done by Rebecca Lancefield at the Rockefeller Institute for Medical Research, that classified 13 different streptococci groups and significantly advanced knowledge on streptococcal diseases.

=== Sulfa drugs ===
Perhaps her more well-known scientific legacy is the work Bliss did investigating sulfa drugs. These were drugs that were being developed in the 1930s and earlier to treat bacterial infections. In July 1936, Bliss and her colleague Perrin H. Long attended the Second International Congress of Microbiology where they obtained samples of the new drug Prontosil. Not a year later, they had successfully used Prontosil to treat a child for erysipelas. This success propelled their research forward to treat more streptococcal diseases including streptococcal meningitis. Their work was used to treat the then president's son, Franklin Delano Roosevelt Jr. In 1937, the S. E. Massengill Company tried to make liquid form of the drug sulfanilamide. They mixed it with a 10% solution of sulfanilamide in diethylene glycol. They called it “Elixir of Sulfanilamide", and distributed it widely. At least 76 people died from this drug specifically because of the diethylene glycol. This disaster led to the United States Congress to enact the Food Drug, and Cosmetic Act, which increased federal regulation over drugs by mandating a market review of the safety of all new drugs.

Following this incidence, Bliss and Long published their book The Clinical and Experimental Use of Sulfanilamide, Sulfapyridine, and Allied Compounds (1939). The book went through the history of sulfanilamide, chemotherapy of experimental bacterial infections, the toxicity and comparative pharmacology of sulfanilamide, the mode of action of sulfanilamide, the clinical use of sulfanilamide (and others), the clinical use of Prontosil and Neoprontosil, as well as the clinical and toxic manifestations of sulfanilamide. The last section of the book served to lessen the fear associated with using these drugs based on fact. Bliss and Long discuss the ways that physicians have come to fear sulfanilamide and its derivatives, and go through the ways in which those fears are unfounded. They say “we think that a realization of the possible toxic effects, based on intelligence rather than fear, is demanded of physicians if a rational therapeutic use is to be made of sulfanilamide and its derivatives. It must be remembered that while the side effects of these drugs are many, relatively few fatalities have been attributed to their use" (266). They go on to say that when used properly, these side effects rarely encounter a fatal outcome.

The sulfa drug work done by Bliss and Long during the 1930s proved itself to be invaluable during the Second World War. It was used extensively throughout the U.S. Armed Forces. Bliss also served as an advisor to the U.S. Army Chemical Corps on defenses against biological weapons.

Due to her extensive contributions to immunology throughout her time at Johns Hopkins University, there is an honorary fellowship dedicated to her. It was established in 1989, two years after her death and is called “The Eleanor Bliss Honorary Fellowship”.

== Selected publications ==
- Bliss, E. A., (1943). Physicians Need to Know How the Viruses Grow. The Science News-Letter, 43(11), 167-167.
- Bliss, E. A., & Long, P. H. (1939). The Clinical and Experimental Use of Sulfanilamide, Sulfapyridine and Allied Compounds. Macmillan.
- Long, P., & Bliss, E. (1938). Studies upon Minute Hemolytic Streptococci: IV. Further Observations upon the Distribution of Ordinary and Minute Beta Hemolytic Streptococci in Normal and Diseased Human Beings. The Journal of Infectious Diseases, 62(1), 52–57.
- Long, P., & Bliss, E. (1937). A Simple and Rapid Method of Preparing Antigenic Streptolysin. The Journal of Infectious Diseases, 61(1), 96–99.
- Long, P., & Bliss, E. (1937). Studies upon the Pertussis Bacillus: The Effects of the Introduction of Pertussis Antigen into the Nasal Passages. The Journal of Infectious Diseases, 61(1), 100–102.
- Rich, A., Long, P., Brown, J., Bliss, E., & Holt, L. (1932). Experiments upon the Cause of Whooping Cough. Science, 76(1971), 330–331.
