= Tuberculous meningitis =

- Other names: TB meningitis, Tubercular meningitis
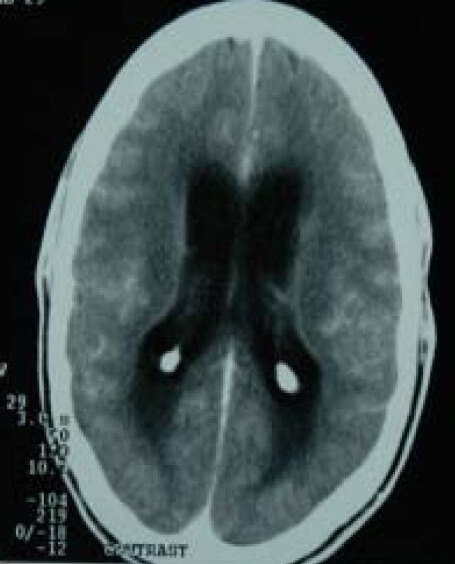
- CT scan showing tuberculous meningitis
- Specialty: Neurology
- Symptoms: Fever
- Causes: Mycobacterium tuberculosis
- Diagnostic method: Blood culture, CT scan
- Treatment: Antibiotic therapy and corticosteroids

Tuberculous meningitis, also known as TB meningitis or tubercular meningitis, is a specific type of bacterial meningitis caused by the Mycobacterium tuberculosis infection of the meninges—the system of membranes which envelop the central nervous system.

== Signs and symptoms ==
Fever and headache are the cardinal features; confusion is a late feature and coma bears a poor prognosis. Meningism is absent in a fifth of patients with TB meningitis. Patients may also have focal neurological deficits.

== Causes ==
Mycobacterium tuberculosis of the meninges is the cardinal feature and the inflammation is concentrated towards the base of the brain. When the inflammation is in the brain stem subarachnoid area, cranial nerve roots may be affected. The symptoms will mimic those of space-occupying lesions.

Blood-borne spread certainly occurs, presumably by crossing the blood–brain barrier, but a proportion of patients may get TB meningitis from rupture of a cortical focus in the brain; an even smaller proportion get it from rupture of a bony focus in the spine.

== Pathophysiology ==
The pathophysiology of tuberculous meningitis involves bacterial invasion of the brain parenchyma meninges or cortex, causing the formation of small subpial foci. These foci, termed Rich foci, are necrotic and expand as the colonies within them multiply. Tubercle (focal) rupture in the subarachnoid space causes meningitis.

== Diagnosis ==
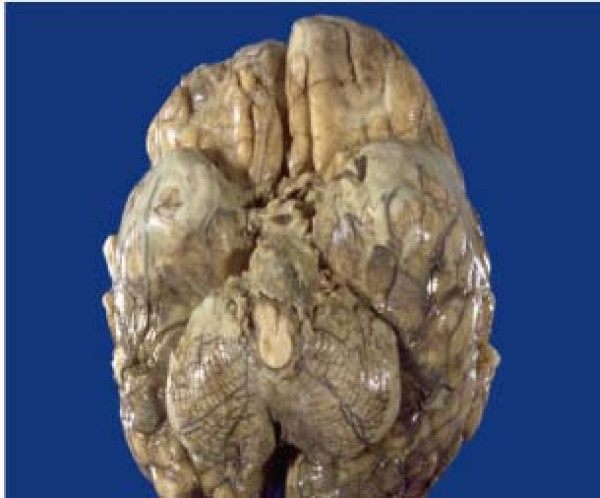
Tuberculous-meningitis-autopsy, showing associated brain oedema and congestion

Diagnosis of TB meningitis is made by analysing cerebrospinal fluid collected by lumbar puncture. When collecting CSF for suspected TB meningitis, a minimum of 1 ml of fluid should be taken (preferably 5 to 10 ml). The CSF usually has a high protein, low glucose and a raised number of lymphocytes. Acid-fast bacilli are sometimes seen on a CSF smear, but more commonly, M. tuberculosis is grown in culture. A spiderweb clot in the CSF that has been collected is rare but indicative of TB meningitis. ELISPOT testing is not useful for the diagnosis of acute TB meningitis and is often false negative, but may paradoxically become positive after treatment has started, which helps to confirm the diagnosis.

=== Nucleic acid amplification tests (NAAT) ===
This is a group of tests that use polymerase chain reaction (PCR) to detect mycobacterial nucleic acid. These test vary in which nucleic acid sequence they detect and vary in their accuracy. The two most common commercially available tests are the amplified mycobacterium tuberculosis direct test (MTD, Gen-Probe) and Amplicor. In 2007, review concluded that for diagnosing tuberculous meningitis "Individually, the AMTD test appears to perform the best (sensitivity 74% and specificity 98%)", they found the pooled prevalence of TB meningitis to be 29%. The fully automated PCR test using the Cepheid GeneXpert system of the Xpert Ultra MTB/RIF has improved sensitivity of up to 77% in persons with HIV and TB meningitis.

== Treatment ==
The treatment of TB meningitis is isoniazid, rifampicin, pyrazinamide and ethambutol for two months, followed by isoniazid and rifampicin alone for a further ten months. Steroids help reduce the risk of death in those without HIV. Steroids can be used in the first six weeks of treatment, A few people may require immunomodulatory agents such as thalidomide. Hydrocephalus occurs as a complication in about a third of people with TB meningitis. The addition of aspirin may reduce or delay mortality, possibly by reducing complications such as cerebral infarctions.

== History ==
The physician Pietro Ramaglia studied tuberculous meningitis in the mid-19th century, with his key work on it, Studi sulla Meningite basilare granulosa (1876), being published a year after he died from the condition.
