= Florida Cevoli =

18th-century Italian Catholic abbess

Blessed Florida Cevoli OSCCap
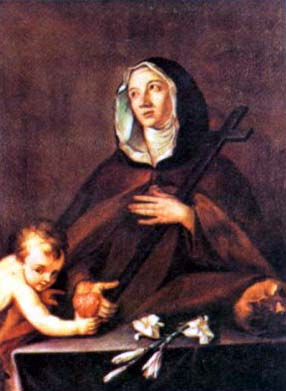

Virgin
- Born: 11 November 1685; Pisa, Grand Duchy of Tuscany
- Died: 12 June 1767 (aged 81); Città di Castello, Perugia, Papal States
- Venerated in: Roman Catholic Church
- Beatified: 16 May 1993, Saint Peter's Square by Pope John Paul II
- Feast: 12 June
- Attributes: Religious habit of the Capuchin Poor Clares, crucifix, white lilies

Florida Cevoli (born as Lucrezia Elena Cevoli, 11 November 1685 – 12 June 1767) was an Italian Capuchin Poor Clare who served as an abbess. She assumed the religious name Florida, devoted her energies to the maintenance of the order in Umbria and carried out her assigned tasks with strong zeal and diligence.

Cevoli's beatification was celebrated in 1993.

== Life ==
Lucrezia Elena Cevoli was born on 11 November 1685 in Pisa to Count Curzio and Countess Laura della Seta. In 1697, her education was entrusted to the Sisters of Saint Martin's College in Pisa.

Upon the news that Cevoli wanted to enter religious life in 1703 Cosimo III stated that "she will not succeed" for he was certain that she would not overcome the difficulties of such a different and austere life instead of the comfortable life she led as a noble.

Cevoli's first contact with the Capuchin Poor Clares was more difficult than she had believed it would be for the mistress of novices, Veronica Giuliani was inclined not to receive her. Yet, Cevoli was received since she had a sincere vocation; she began her novitiate on 8 June 1703. Cevoli made her vows on 10 June 1705.

In 1716, Veronica Giuliani, the former novice mistress, became the abbess of the convent, and Cevoli was appointed as a vicar. With the death of Giuliani, Cevoli succeeded her; she continued the work started under her predecessor and did not use strong and harsh impositions to do so. Instead she did so with a degree of both firmness and gentleness which was a stark contrast to that of Giuliani. Cevoli also served as a chief promoter of the canonization cause of Giuliani.

Cevoli died on 12 June 1767 after a month of a burning fever. The examination of her remains after her death showed unusual markings on the sides of her chest but her heart appeared to be normal. However some effects were seen on her aorta that were inexplicable as being a natural phenomena.

== Beatification ==
The beatification process commenced on 1 June 1838 and the commencement bestowed upon Cevoli the title Servant of God. This ushered in the two processes that saw documents gathered and also witness testimonies. Both were ratified to proceed and all documentation went to the Congregation of Rites. She was proclaimed to be Venerable on 19 June 1910 after Pope Pius X recognized that she had lived a life of heroic virtue.

A miracle was investigated in a diocesan tribunal and was ratified in 1991. The miracle was approved on 13 June 1992 and Pope John Paul II beatified Cevoli in 1993.
