= Maria Llorença Llong =

Spanish Capuchin Poor Clare and Blessed

Blessed Maria Llorença Llong OSCCap
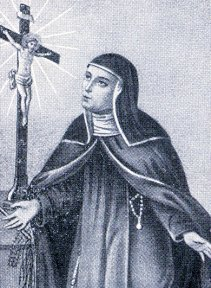
- Maria Llorença Llong on a print (18th century)
- Born: 1463; Lleida, Crown of Aragon
- Died: 21 December 1539 (aged 76); Naples, Kingdom of Naples
- Venerated in: Roman Catholic Church
- Beatified: 9 October 2021, Cathedral of Santa Maria Assunta, Naples, Italy by Cardinal Marcello Semeraro
- Feast: 21 October

Maria Llorença Requenses Llong (Italian: Maria Lorenza Longo; 1463 – 21 December 1539) was a Spanish nun and the founder of the order of the Capuchin Poor Clares. Llong founded the Ospedale degli Incurabili Santa Maria del Popolo in Naples which received numerous papal privileges from Pope Leo X and Pope Adrian VI.

Her beatification was celebrated in Naples on 9 October 2021.

== Life ==
Maria Llorença Llong was born in Lleida sometime in 1463 to nobles and she relocated to Naples in 1506 alongside her husband Juan Llong (who enjoyed the favor of Ferdinand II of Aragon) despite being paralyzed at the time. Her husband died in 1509 and left her with her three children at which point she went on a pilgrimage to Loreto where she was cured of her paralysis in what she attributed to the intercession of the Blessed Virgin Mary.

Llong became a Franciscan and she founded both a house to care for prostitutes in 1526 and a hospital for ill people. Llong established the hospital of Santa Maria del Popolo in 1519. Llong wanted to go on a pilgrimage but she had a vision that revealed that she should establish a convent dedicated to Santa Maria in Gerusalemme (Our Lady in Jerusalem). Llong wanted to re-establish the original concepts of being simple and humble in addition to poorness of spirit and adherence to the austerities of Ss. Francis of Assisi and Clare of Assisi. This re-establishment followed the lead that Matteo da Bascio had set when he founded the Order of Friars Minor Capuchin.

The new convent was established with the help of the Capuchin friars, and the sisters became known as Capuchin Poor Clares. The nuns wore a simple Capuchin tunic knotted with a cord, a short cape, the wimple and a black veil.

During Llong's lifetime the first group of sisters was sent to the Italian mainland attracting funding from a range of philanthropists. Llong's idea to establish an order along the lines of Clare of Assisi was seen as a move to establish the fundamental principles that Clare established in 1212. In 1533, Llong chose Gaetano dei Conti di Thiene CR as her spiritual director.

Llong sought to obtain papal approval for her convent and this led to Pope Paul III issuing his approval in Debitum Pastoralis Officii on 19 February 1535 and later for the official founding on 10 December 1538. The hospital also received numerous papal privileges from Pope Leo X and Pope Adrian VI while Gian Pietro Carafa, the future Pope Paul IV, supported the founding and maintenance of the hospital.

Llong died in Naples on 21 December 1539. Her relics were exhumed in 1935. All that remained was a skull which was placed in a reliquary in her convent.

== Beatification process ==
The beatification process commenced in an informative process in Naples that Guglielmo Sanfelice d'Acquavilla inaugurated on 9 November 1880 and later closed on 20 March 1883. Theologians assumed charge of all of her writings and approved them to be orthodox on 17 May 1890.

The cause was formally opened on 4 September 1892 under Pope Leo XIII and Llong was titled as a Servant of God. Sanfelice opened an apostolic process on 2 December 1893 and the process concluded on 19 December 1903 when Giuseppe Antonio Ermenegildo Prisco closed it. The Congregation of Rites validated the processes on 27 November 1907 and went on to remain inactive for several decades. On 12 June 2004 the postulator in charge of Franciscan causes, Florio Tessari, filed a petition to Cardinal Michele Giordano to reopen the cause and the cardinal oversaw the supplementary process from 29 June 2004 until 16 May 2005. The cause's re-opening was approved on 30 November 2005 after the Congregation for the Causes of Saints issued the nihil obstat and then validated the supplementary process on 1 February 2008.

The postulation submitted the positio to the Congregation for the Causes of Saints in 2015 and a board of historians approved the cause and the contents of the dossier on 1 September 2015. Theologians approved the cause on 9 March 2017; Pope Francis confirmed Llong's heroic virtue and named her as venerable on 9 October 2017.

Pope Francis approved a miracle attributed to Llong's intercession on 27 October 2020; and her beatification was celebrated in Naples on 9 October 2021. Cardinal Marcello Semeraro presided over the celebration on the Pope's behalf. The postulator for this cause is Carlo Calloni.

On 8 March 2005 a dossier was found on an alleged miracle that recorded the cure of Maria Cherubina Pirro who was cured of severe tuberculosis on 15 October 1881 after visiting the remains of Llong.
