= Maria Costanza Panas =

Italian nun and Venerated Catholic

Blessed Maria Costanza Panas OSCCap

Virgin
- Born: Agnese Pacifica Panas; 15 January 1896; Alano di Piave, Belluno, Kingdom of Italy
- Died: 28 May 1963 (aged 67); Fabriano, Ancona, Italy
- Venerated in: Roman Catholic Church
- Beatified: 9 October 2022, Cattedrale di San Venanzio, Fabriano, Italy by Cardinal Marcello Semeraro
- Feast: 28 May

Maria Costanza Panas, born Agnese Pacifica Panas, (15 January 1896 - 28 May 1963), was an Italian Capuchin Poor Clare. Panas did her education in northern Italian cities before she worked as a teacher. It was not until a short while following her teaching career that she decided to become a nun and so entered a convent in secret after her parents and uncle exhibited opposition to her desire. In the convent she served as novice mistress and served as an abbess on two separate occasions and was even elected to a prominent religious council despite her several severe illnesses during the late 1950s.

The beatification process for Panas launched in 1983 in the Diocese of Fabriano-Matelica and she became titled as a Servant of God. The cause gained greater traction on 10 October 2016 after Pope Francis signed a decree that recognized her heroic virtue and named her as venerable. He approved her beatification in 2022 and she was beatified in Fabriano on 9 October 2022.

== Life ==
Agnese Pacifica Panas was born on 15 January 1896 in Alano di Piave in the Belluno province to Antonio Benvenuto Panas and Maria Biasotto as the fourth of six children. Panas had three sisters preceding her: Clelia and then both Angelina and Adele who died in their infancies. In her own childhood she fell ill which caused her mother distress since she still was mourning the loss of Angelina and Adele; her mother entrusted her to the intercession of the Madonna di Monte Berico (venerated in the north) and Panas managed to recover.

Her artisan parents lost their jobs due to the industrialization in the region and so were forced to emigrate to the United States of America in 1902. Panas was left in the care of her paternal priest uncle Angelo who was a chaplain. Her schooling began under the Canossians in Feltre and later continued in Vicenza and on 5 August 1906 she received her First Communion. Panas remained in her uncle's care (receiving her initial education and religious formation from him) until her parents returned in 1910. Her parents returned with two new children Maximina and Rosa who had been born in the United States. In 1910 she moved to the Saint Alvise college in Venice and also attended the Nicolò Tommaseo Institute there before she graduated in 1913. It was following her graduation that she began teaching in the Conetta neighborhood of Cona close to Venice and it was there in 1914 that she met Father Luigi Fritz who would begin serving as her confidante and spiritual director until the end of their lives (which occurred within weeks of each other). It was also around this stage that Panas began keeping a journal and made the resolution that she would never write unless it was about or for Jesus Christ.

Panas made her intentions known to her uncle and parents that she wished to become a nun. Her uncle and her parents opposed this and attempted to dissuade her but Fritz encouraged her and helped her leave her home so that she could enter the convent in Fabriano on 11 October 1917. Panas assumed the religious habit on 19 April 1918 and took the religious name Maria Costanza before making her first vows on 8 May 1919. Her solemn vows were made into the hands of the abbess on 9 May 1922. Panas was later elected on 19 May 1927 as the novice mistress and later on 22 June 1936 was elected as abbess; she retained that position until 1952 though was voted abbess once more in 1955 and held the position until her death.

Panas began to feel the effects of ill health in the 1950s such as deteriorating sight but in 1959 grew ill. But on 19 February 1960 her health declined due to arthritis that forced her to her bed for the remainder of her life. Panas also suffered from asthma and phlebitis in addition to a series of heart problems and often suffered from nausea due to high fevers she often had to struggle with. Panas was also elected in the 1950s to the Capuchin Poor Clare Federation for the central provinces despite her serious ill health which started to trouble her since around 1955.

Her ill health continued to decline at a gradual pace over time and she offered her sufferings for Pope John XXIII and for a good outcome to the Second Vatican Council which had been opened in late 1962. Learning about the death of her friend Fritz just a short time before her death caused her distress and the pope's illness also caused her distress. Panas died in her room at 11:00am on 28 May 1963. Her remains were later relocated from their burial site in mid-1977. Father Pio - despite never having even met Panas but who knew about her - referred to her as "the beloved creature of God" and perceived her holiness to "shine like a star".

== Beatification ==
The beatification process was launched on 23 May 1983 after the Congregation for the Causes of Saints issued the official nihil obstat edict and titled Panas as a Servant of God. The diocesan investigation into her life and reputation for holiness opened in the Fabriano-Matelica diocese on 10 October 1983 and was closed sometime later on 17 April 1988 before all documentation collected was sealed in boxes and sent to the C.C.S. in Rome who would begin their own investigation based on the evidence submitted. The C.C.S. issued a decree that validated the diocesan process on 12 November 1993 as having complied with their regulations for conducting causes.

The postulation - officials in charge of the cause - compiled and submitted the official Positio dossier to the C.C.S. for further investigation in 1998. This dossier was the accumulation of all evidence collected during the diocesan investigation and was a position paper designed to assess her reputation for holiness based on documents and witness interrogatories. Theologians met and approved the cause after having reviewed the dossier on 12 May 2015 as did the cardinal and bishop members of the C.C.S. on 4 October 2016. Panas became titled as Venerable on 10 October 2016 after Pope Francis confirmed that she had lived a model life that demonstrated heroic virtue.

Her beatification depends upon the papal confirmation of a miracle which is in most cases a healing that neither science or medicine can explain. The Ancona archdiocese investigated one such case from 2010 until 2019 and sent its findings to the C.C.S. in Rome for further medical assessment. Pope Francis approved the evidence presented to him on 18 February 2022 and cleared Panas to be beatified; the beatification rite was celebrated in Fabriano on 9 October 2022.

The current postulator for this cause is the Capuchin friar Carlo Calloni.
