= Consolata Betrone =

Italian mystic and Franciscan nun (1903–1946)

Venerable Consolata Betrone O.F.M. Cap.
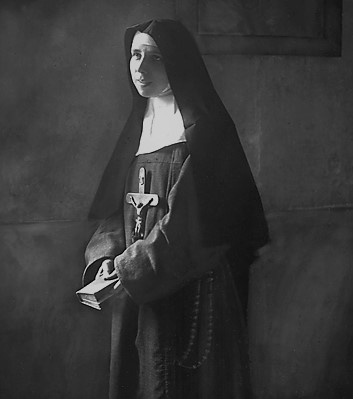

Nun
- Born: 6 April 1903; Saluzzo, Piedmont, Italy
- Died: 18 July 1946 (aged 43); Turin, Italy
- Venerated in: Catholic Church
- Patronage: Franciscan Order of Friars Minor Capuchin

Maria Consolata Betrone (6 April 1903 – 18 July 1946), baptised as Pierina Maria Betrone, commonly known as Consolata Betrone, was an Italian Catholic mystic and nun of the Capuchin Poor Clares order.

Consolata Betrone was known for the intense propagation of the Holy Rosary, along with reputed apparitions by the Sacred Heart of Jesus and her guardian angel in 1916 during the Feast of the Immaculate Conception. The reputed messages asked for the recitation of: "Jesus, Mary, I love you! Save Souls!", in reparation for blasphemies against the Sacred Heart of Jesus. The pious devotion is very popular among Filipino and Portuguese Catholics, who include invocations in their recitation of the rosary along with the Fatima Prayer.

== Life ==
Pierina Lorenzina Giovanna Betrone was the daughter of Pietro Betrone and Giuseppina Nirino, the owners of a bakery in Saluzzo (Cuneo) and then managers of a restaurant in Airasco (Turin). Pierina was the second of six daughters born of her father's second marriage. She joined the association of the Company of the Daughters of Mary in the parish of San Massimo in Turin. After a visit to the tomb of Don Bosco in Valsalice, Pierina decided it was time to embark on a religious vocation. Her reading of The Story of a Soul attracted her to Thérèse of Lisieux's "little way".

On 26 January 1925, Betrone joined the Daughters of Mary Help of Christians, but after a little over a year, she became convinced that this was not her calling. She then enrolled in the Italian League of Teaching and became involved in the local Catholic Action group. She tried a community founded by Giuseppe Benedetto Cottolengo, but returned to her family in August 1928 and continued her work with "Catholic Action". The superior of the Sisters of the Good Shepherd of Angers suggested that she might join the Franciscans.

On 28 February 1930, Betrone joined the Capuchin Poor Clares in Turin, taking the name Maria Consolata. (The Blessed Virgin Mary is venerated in Turin under the name of Consolata, i.e., Consoler of the Afflicted.) She made her simple profession on 6 April 1931 and her solemn profession on 8 April 1934. She served, among other duties, as cook and concierge. She purportedly experienced interior locutions with Christ.

In 1938, Betrone was assigned to the new monastery of Moriondo (Testona-Turin) not far from the Turin-Genoa railway. There she performed the services of secretary and nurse until 1945. Her confessor, Fr. Lorenzo Sales, a Consolata Missionary, suggested she write a short autobiography. On 25 October 1945 Betrone was diagnosed with pulmonary tuberculosis and shortly thereafter left for a sanatorium. Her condition being diagnosed as terminal, she returned to the monastery of Moriondo on 3 July 1946.

Consolata Betrone died at the convent of Moriondo, in Testona, Italy, at the age of forty-three on 18 July 1946. Her remains rest in the monastery of the Sacred Heart in Moncalieri.

After her death, Lorenzo Sales wrote the book Jesus Appeals to the World based on her reported messages. Betrone is known for her prayer: "Jesus, Mary, I love you: Save souls". Betrone spent her life attempting to bring to perfection this Very Little Way.

In 1995, Cardinal Giovanni Saldarini started the canonical process of beatification for Maria Consolata Betrone. "The Servant of God distinguished herself for her tireless work in the service of the community, where she carried out the humblest tasks and cultivated an intense life of prayer and constant sacrifices."

"A mystic is always placed in the context of his historical time...There is revealed a spirituality of reparation, perfectly in harmony with that desire for penance which animated the beginnings of her vocation."

On 6 April 2019 Pope Francis authorized the Congregation for the Causes of Saints to promulgate the decree recognising the heroic virtues of Betrone giving her the title Venerable. 6 April is also the date of her birth.
