= Ospedale degli Incurabili =

Historical hospital complex in Naples

Coordinates: 40.854000°N 14.254845°E

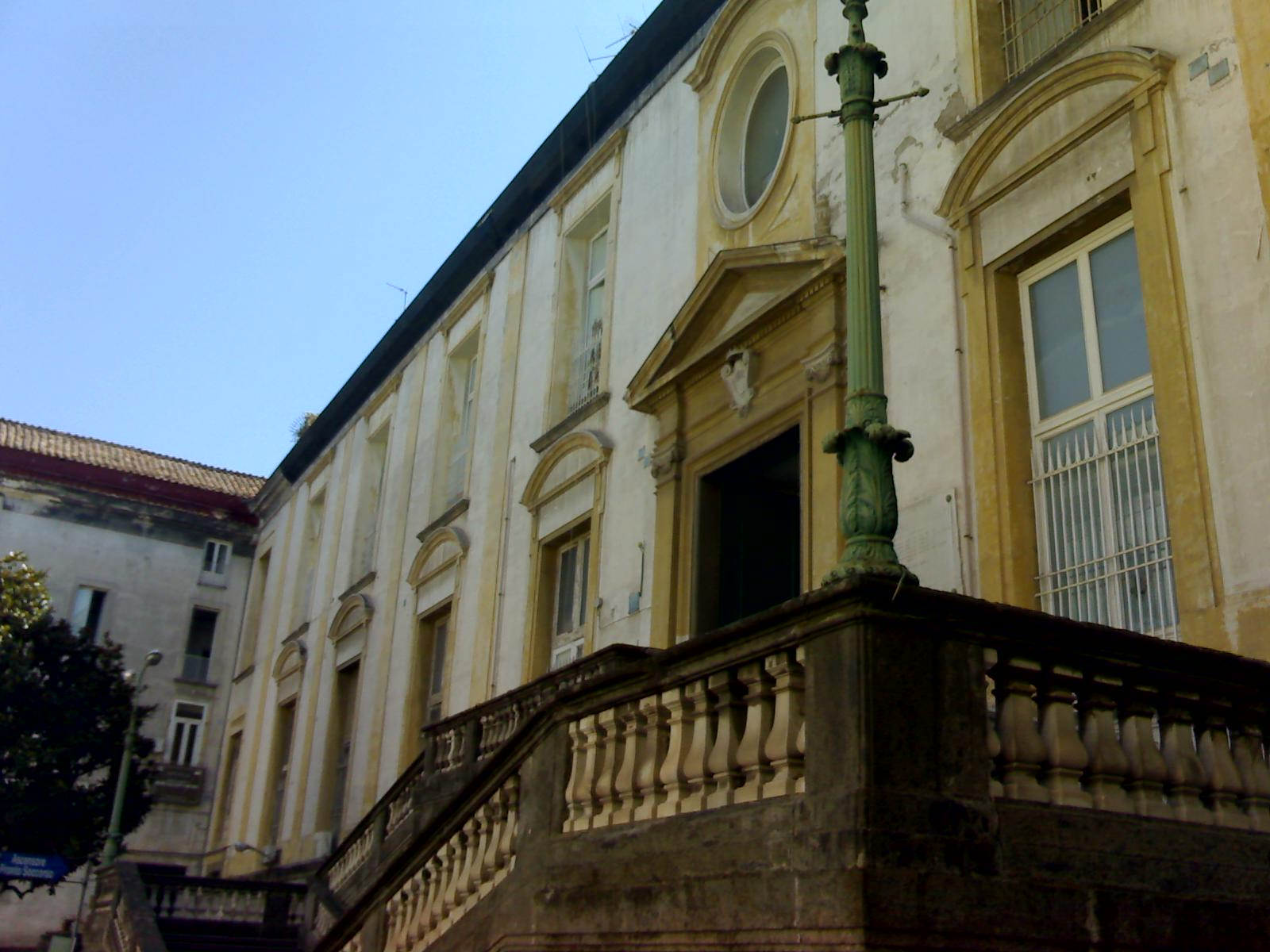
Facade of the Hospital as viewed from internal courtyard

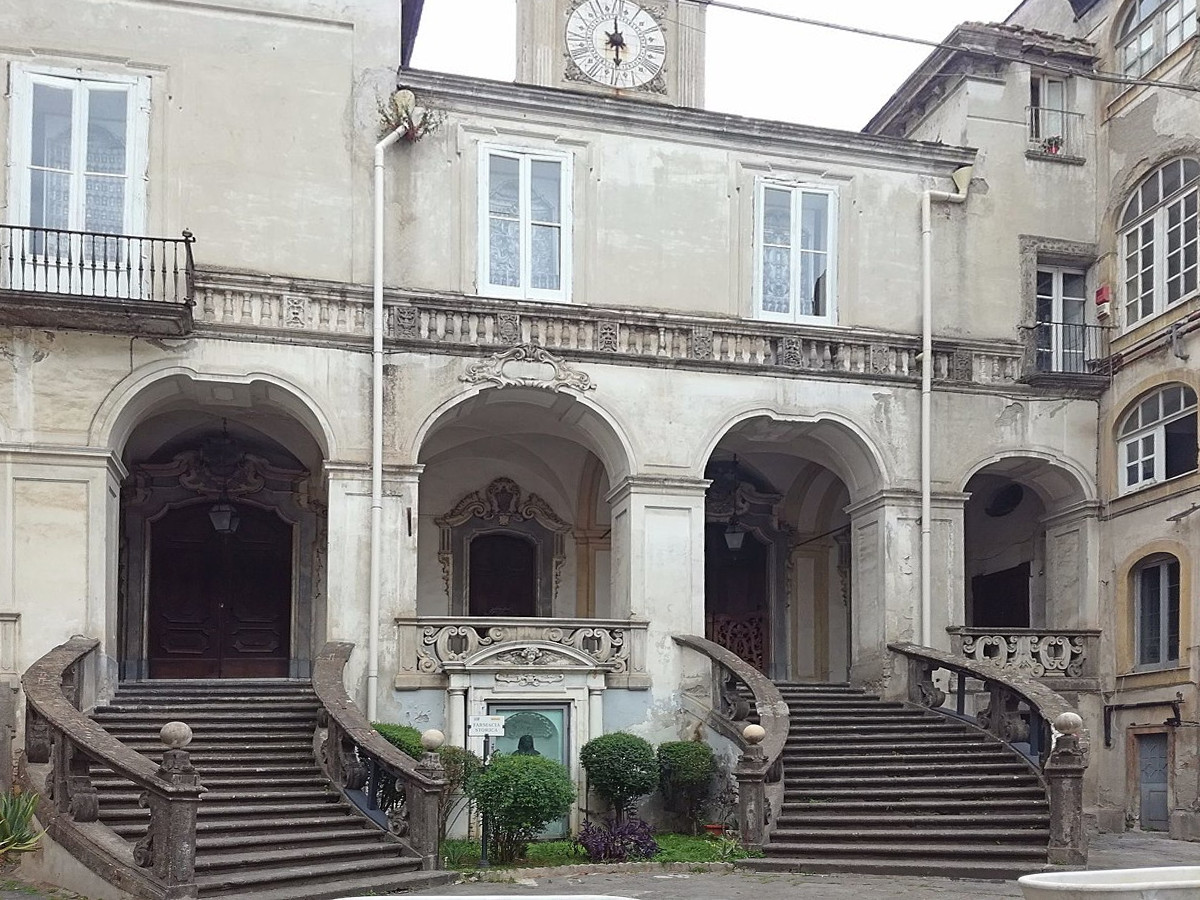
Facade of the pharmacy (left with clocktower) and church of Santa Maria del Popolo

The Ospedale degli Incurabili (Hospital for the Incurables) or Complesso degli Incurabili is an ancient and prominent former hospital complex located on Via Maria Longo in central Naples, Italy. Nowadays, parts of the premises, including the pharmacy, house the Museo delle arti sanitarie of Naples.

== History ==
Originally built in Renaissance style, the complex incorporated in the structures of the churches of Santa Maria del Popolo and Santa Maria Succurre Miseris dei Bianchi, as well as the ospedale (hospital) of Santa Maria del Popolo degli Incurabili. In time, it also incorporated the adjacent S. Maria delle Grazie Maggiore a Caponapoli and its cloister, the monastery of Santa Maria della Consolazione, the church of Santa Maria di Gerusalemme and the cloister of the Trentatré. The hospital was founded in 1521 by Maria Lorenza Longo after she became paralyzed by a malady. Among the main donors of the next century was the merchant Gaspar Roomer. In the 19th century, donors included Professor Cotugno and Signore Marchetti of Messina.

Pietro Ramaglia, later physician of the King Ferdinand II of the Two Sicilies, worked in a series of roles in the hospital from shortly after 1823 onwards.

== Pharmacy ==
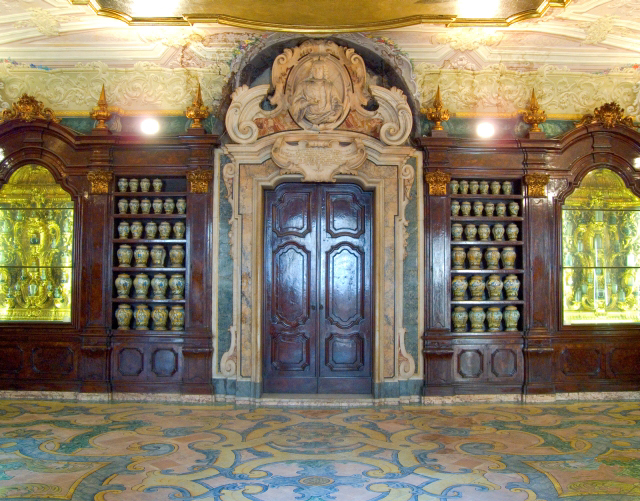
Interior

In the mid 18th century, Antonio Maggiocca was the patron for the building of the pharmacy. The structure was designed by Bartolomeo Vecchione. Maggiocca’s marble bust inside was sculpted by Matteo Bottiglieri in 1750. The pharmacy remains, generally intact with cabinets and nearly 400 maiolica vases (albarelli) for compounds, made by Lorenzo Salandra and Donato Massa. The tiled floors were made by Giuseppe Massa. The ceiling was frescoed by Pietro Bardellino. The Pharmacy consists of a grand salon, an entrance room, and a small laboratory. The latter is decorated in stucco and has an elaborate table by the woodworker Agostino Fucito.

== Church of Santa Maria del Popolo ==
The renaissance style funereal monument by the main altar was completed by Giovanni da Nola. The Frescoes in the church were completed by Giuliano Bugiardini, Marco Cardisco, Francesco De Mura, Marco Pino, Giovanni Battista Rossi, and Carlo Sellitto. In the Cappella Montalto is an altarpiece by Girolamo D'Auria. The sacristy was frescoed by Giovanni Battista Rossi.

== Church of Santa Maria dei Bianchi ==
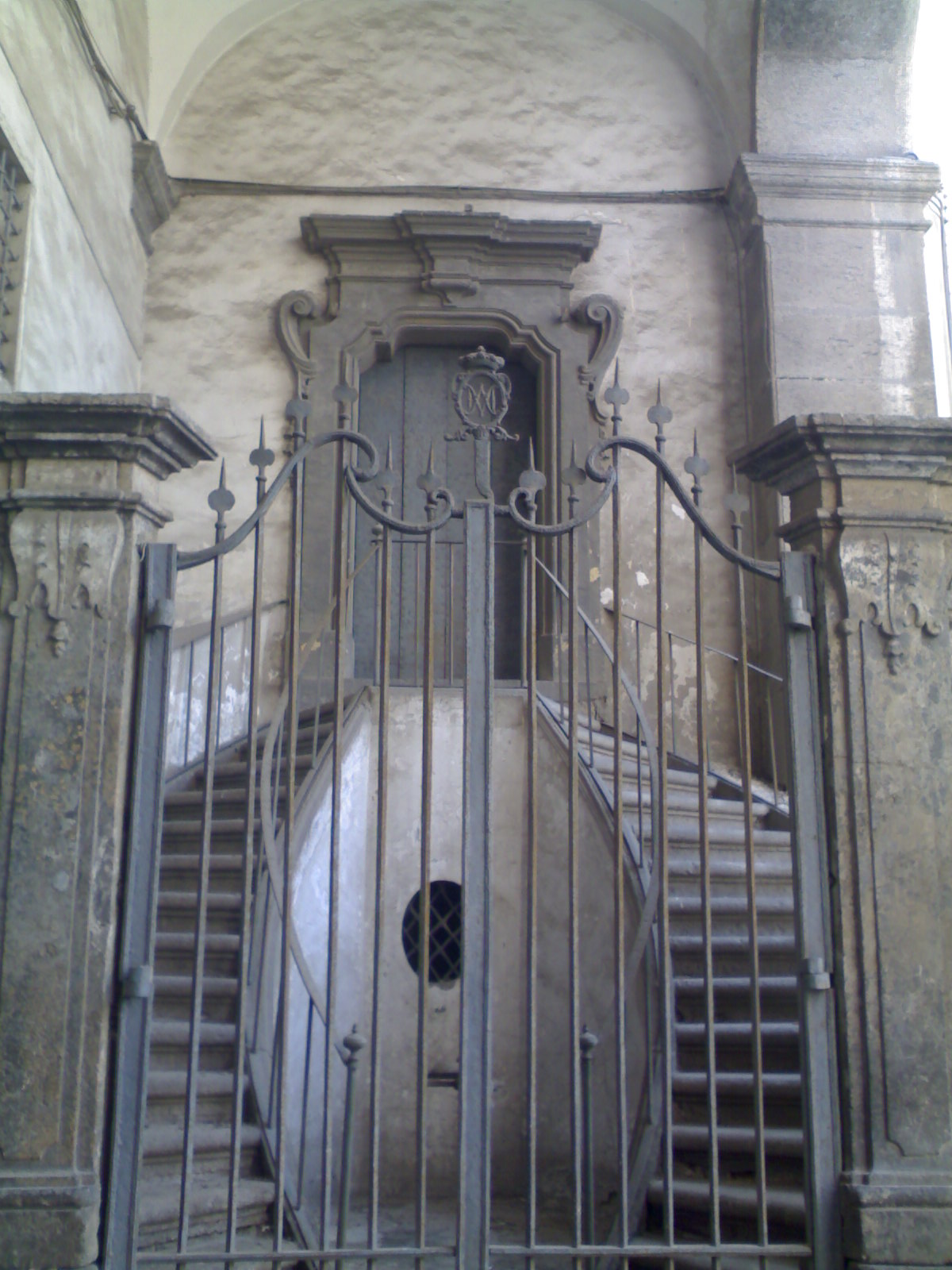
Church of Congregation of the Bianchi della Giustizia

The church of Santa Maria dei Bianchi (or Congregation of the Bianchi della Giustizia) was a church build by a white-robed confraternity attached to the complex, and whose role was the assistance to those condemned to death. The church was founded in 1473. In 1673, it was restored in Baroque style by Dionisio Lazzari. Much of the church as well as the pharmacy now is in poor state. The main altar has a statue of the Virgin by Giovanni da Nola, while the ceiling was frescoed by Giovanni Battista Beinaschi. The sacristy has frescoes by Paolo De Matteis depicting members of the confraternity.

== See also ==
- 16th-century Western domes

== Bibliography ==
- Antonio Terraciano, Andrea Russo, Le chiese di Napoli. Censimento e brevi recensioni delle 448 chiese storiche della città di Napoli, Lorenzo Giunta Editore, 1999.
- Vincenzo Regina, Le chiese di Napoli. Viaggio indimenticabile attraverso la storia artistica, architettonica, letteraria, civile e spirituale della Napoli sacra, Newton e Compton editore, Napoli 2004
- Lomonaco, Angelo (31 October 2011), "Incurabili, un museo "regionale" sull'incontro tra arte e medicina", Corriere del Mezzogiorno
- Gennaro Aspreno Galante, Le chiese di Napoli. Guida sacra alla città, la storia, le opere d'arte e i monumenti. Solemar Edizioni, Mugano di Napoli 2007.
