= Jeremiah Benettis =

Italian writer and Friar Minor Capuchin

Jeremiah Benettis (died 1774) was an Italian writer and Friar Minor Capuchin.

He belonged to the Province of Piedmont in Italy, and wrote two historical treatises. The first, titled Chronica et critics historiæ sacrae et profanæ, deals with various astronomical questions and the religious rites and ceremonies of ancient peoples, and was written with a view to facilitate the study of the Bible. In the second work, titled Privilegiorum S. Petri vindicia, he gives a history of the primacy of the pope.
