= Rich focus =

A Rich focus is a tuberculous granuloma occurring within the cortex or meninges of the brain that ruptures into the subarachnoid space, causing tuberculous meningitis. The Rich focus is named for Arnold Rice Rich, a pathologist at Johns Hopkins Hospital, who along with his colleague Howard McCordock first described the post-mortem finding of caseous foci within the cerebral cortex or meninges which appeared to predate the development of meningitis. Prior to their research the prevailing view had been that meningitis occurred as a result of the dissemination of tuberculous bacilli associated with miliary tuberculosis and that these processes occurred at the same time.

== Developments ==
More recently a more comprehensive classification of the pathogenesis of tuberculous meningitis has been proposed by Donald et al.:

1. A Rich focus develops as a result of haematogenous dissemination from the primary complex, including miliary tuberculousis, subsequently rupturing into the sub-arachnoid space.
2. A Rich focus develops within the choroid plexus or ventricular walls as a result of haematogenous dissemination.
3. The mechanism described by Rich and McCordock in which haematogenous dissemination at the time of infection, or later, results in development of a Rich focus which is initially controlled but later ruptures into the subarachnoid space.
4. Direct extension from an adjacent structure such as the vertebrae results in development of meningitis.
