= Veronica Giuliani =

Italian Catholic saint (1660–1727)

Saint Veronica Giuliani OSC Cap
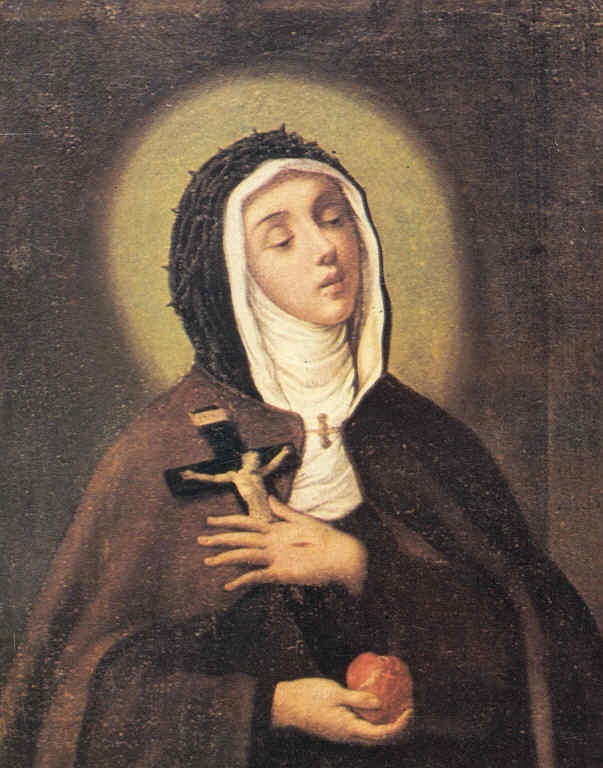

Virgin
- Born: 27 December 1660; Mercatello sul Metauro, Duchy of Urbino (Present-day Italy)
- Died: 9 July 1727 (aged 66); Città di Castello, Papal States (Present-day Italy)
- Venerated in: Catholic Church
- Beatified: 17 June 1804 by Pope Pius VII
- Canonized: 26 May 1839 by Pope Gregory XVI
- Major shrine: Monastery of St. Veronica Giuliani, Città di Castello
- Feast: 9 July, 10 July (Franciscans)
- Attributes: Capuchin habit, crowned with thorns and embracing a crucifix

Veronica Giuliani (also Veronica de Julianis; 27 December 1660 – 9 July 1727) was an Italian Capuchin Poor Clares nun and mystic. She was canonized by Pope Gregory XVI in 1839.

== Life ==
=== Early life ===
She was born Orsola or Ursula Giuliani at Mercatello sul Metauro in the Duchy of Urbino on 27 December 1660. Her parents were Francesco and Benedetta Mancini Giuliani. She was the youngest of seven sisters, three of whom chose the monastic life.

It is said that at the age of three years, Giuliani supposedly began to show great compassion for the poor. She would set apart a portion of her food for them, and even part with her clothes when she met a poor child scantily clad. Her mother died when Ursula was seven years of age.

When others did not readily join in her religious practices, she was inclined to be dictatorial. At the age of 16, she experienced a vision which corrected this imperfection of character: she saw her own heart as a "heart of steel". In her writings, she confesses that she took a certain pleasure in the more stately circumstances which her family adopted when her father was appointed superintendent of finance at Piacenza. When Giuliani came of age, her father believed she should marry, and so he desired her to take part in the social activities of the young people. But she pleaded so earnestly with her father that, after much resistance, he finally permitted her to choose her own state in life.

=== Life in the monastery ===
In 1677, at the age of 17, Giuliani was received into the monastery of the Capuchin Poor Clares in Città di Castello in Umbria, Italy, taking the religious name of Veronica in memory of the Passion of Christ. At the conclusion of the ceremony of her reception, the bishop said to the abbess: "I commend this new daughter to your special care, for she will one day be a great saint".

Giuliani became absolutely submissive to the will of her spiritual directors, though her novitiate was marked by extraordinary interior trials and temptations to return to the world. In her first years in the monastery, she worked in the kitchen, infirmary and sacristy and also served as portress. At the age of 34, she was made novice mistress.

For fifty years, Giuliani lived in the Capuchin convent. With gritty determination tempered by humility, she led her sisters as novice mistress for thirty-four years and as abbess for eleven. Giuliani governed the convent with obvious common sense and guided the novices with prudence. She would not allow them to read mystical books, requiring them instead to study books on Christian basics. In 1716, she was elected abbess. As a practical woman, she improved her sisters’ comfort by enlarging the convent rooms and having water piped inside.

=== Spiritual trials ===
Giuliani had a lifelong devotion to Christ crucified that eventually became manifested in physical signs. The marks of the crown of thorns appeared on her forehead in 1694 and the five wounds on her body in 1697. Giuliani was humiliated by the stigmata itself and by her bishop's rigorous testing of her experience. He removed her from ordinary community life and put her under constant observation. When he determined that the phenomena were authentic, he allowed her to return to normal convent life and continue her service to her sisters. She died on 9 July 1727 at Città di Castello.

== Veneration ==
Veronica Giuliani was beatified by Pope Pius VII on 17 June 1804 and was canonized by Pope Gregory XVI on 26 May 1839. She is usually represented in art crowned with thorns and embracing the cross. Her body remained incorrupt for several years but was eventually destroyed by a flood; her relics are now placed in a lifelike figure.

A Lebanese religious, Brother Emmanuel, came upon her writings in 1994 while serving at a monastery in Deir al-Zour, Syria. Emmanuel founded a congregation, the Little Servants of the Immaculate Heart of Mary, in 2015. He believed Giuliani "has chosen Lebanon as a country to begin, or to intensify, her mission because Lebanon loves Our Lady a lot and has a very deep relationship with Mary". As of 2016, there are seven nuns and four brothers in the congregation. Banners throughout the country proclaimed "A saint rises up in Lebanon!" heralding the first church in the world outside of Italy dedicated to Saint Veronica Giuliani. The newly built church, in Ksaibe, Lebanon, was consecrated on 9 July 2016, the saint's feast day.
