= Pietro Ramaglia =

Italian physician and surgeon

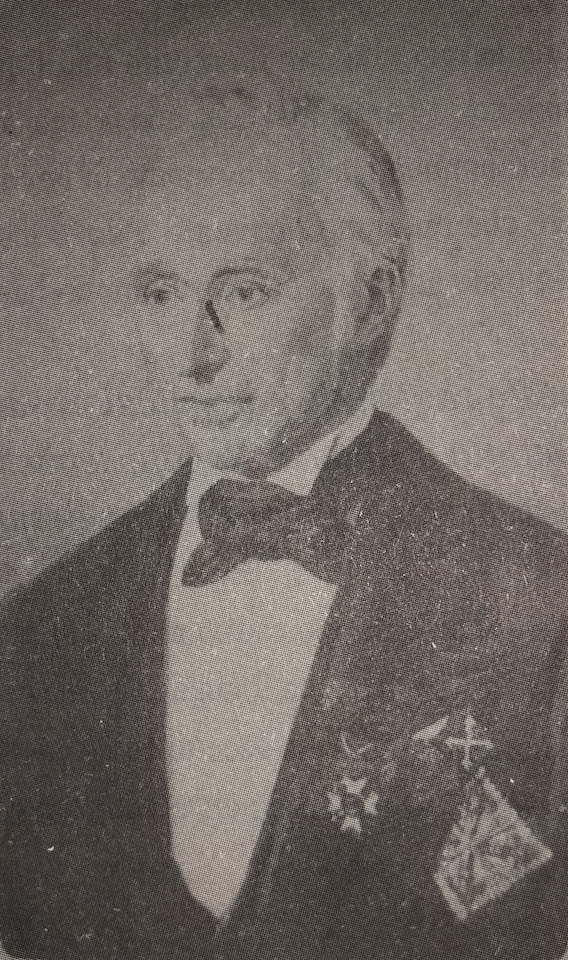
- Born: 31 March 1802; Ripabottoni, Italy
- Died: 4 June 1875; Naples, Italy
- Scientific career
- Fields: medicine
- Workplaces: Royal Medical College

Pietro Ramaglia (1802–1875) was an Italian medical doctor and surgeon. He is considered one of the leading figures in the history of medicine in Molise and of the neapolitan medicine of his time. Indeed, he was one of the most important doctors of the Kingdom of the Two Sicilies, being the personal physician of the King Ferdinand II of the Two Sicilies. In medicine he was one of the proponents of the experimental anatomo-clinical method and founder of the Neapolitan positive-naturalistic school that opposed the vitalist theories then in vogue and supported in Milan by Giovanni Rasori and in Bologna by Giacomo Tommasini with his "New Italian Medical Doctrine".

== Studies ==
Pietro Ramaglia was born on 31 March 1802 in Ripabottoni from a family of humble means: his father, Francesco (1773 - 1851) worked as a tailor, while his mother, Veneranda de Julio (1775 - 1815) was a farmer. He completed his elementary studies in his birth town, probably due to the poverty of his parents. Having shown excellent predisposition, he was sent to Larino's seminary to continue his studies. Released with the certificate of highly trained student, he was sent to complete his preparation in the Domenico Trotta's private college in Toro, Molise, situated in the Kingdom of the Two Sicilies. The prof. Nasca, his friend and colleague, reports that the young Ramaglia, at the early age of 15, decided to study medicine after meeting with a doctor who had particularly struck him. He moved to Naples after completing his studies in Toro, Molise. There he was welcomed as an intern in the Royal Medical College, where he graduated in 1823, being awarded, in consideration of his academic distinction, with the complete exemption from any expense connected to the graduation. During his studies he was particularly appreciated by his professors for his acumen and the tenacious application to the study.

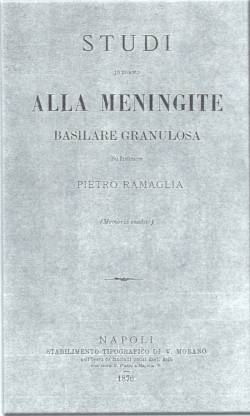

== Works ==
After his graduation he entered as an assistant in the Ospedale degli Incurabili, Naples (Italian for "Hospital for Incurables"). Here he devoted himself, with particular interest, to the study of normal and pathological anatomy. Always updated on the progress of medicine, he developed a "diagnostic method" that was described and published by his student, dr. Domenico Capozzi. In 1833 he opened a private study, where he started his career as private lecturer, activity that he would have carried on up until 8 November 1849, when he was authorized to continue his teachings in the Ospedale degli Incurabili. Later on, in 1852, he was appointed personal physician to the king of Two Sicilies, Ferdinand II of Bourbon. In 1857 he co-founded a medical journal named "Il Morgagni", after the famous anatomist Giovanni Battista Morgagni, which, under his direction, rapidly became one of the most relevant periodical publications on the subject. It was only after the fall of the Kingdom of Two Sicilies that Francesco De Sanctis, Minister of Education in the first post unitary government and reorganizer of the University of Naples, called him to the chair of pathological anatomy firstly and then to that of Medical Clinic. In 1865, however, Ramaglia, who had had the first signs of the evil that ten years later would have taken him to the grave, renounced his chair, but did not abandon his studies which ended with the precise analysis of his illness. He studied tuberculous meningitis for 40 years grouping a remarkable series of works which committed him until the end of his life, in Naples on June 4, 1875. He left his wife, Marianna Tambelli, the task of publishing his latest work "Studies on the basic granular meningitis", a study that saw the light in 1876.

== Personal life ==
In 1839 he married the noblewoman Marianna Tambelli, of the barons of San Martino and Sant’Anzino, whose father was the wealthy neapolitan lawyer Paolo Tambelli, baron of Sant’Anzino; he had two daughters: Giovanna, married into the barons del Pozzo family, and Concetta, married to Luigi d’Amato, patrician of Amantea.

== Awards and honours ==
- Knight of the Sacred Military Constantinian Order of Saint George;
- Knight of the Royal Order of Francis I;
- Knight of the Order of the Crown of Italy;
- Knight of the Order of Saint Maurice and Lazarus;

== Publications ==
- "Notomia Topografica" (1840)
- "Metodo diagnostico" (1862)
- "Studi sulla Meningite basilare granulosa" (1876)

== Bibliography ==
- Angelo Camillo De Meis, Idea generale dello sviluppo delle scienze mediche in Italia nella prima metà del secolo, Torino 1851.
- Angelo Camillo De Meis, Degli elementi della medicina, Stabilimento tipografico di Giacomo Monti, Bologna 1864.
- T. L. De Sanctis, "Discorso letto nella casa del defunto", La Gazzetta della provincia di Molise, n.26 13 Giugno 1875
- G. Limoncelli, "Poche parole pronunciate sul feretro del prof. Pietro Ramaglia", La Gazzetta della Provincia di Molise, 20 giugno 1875
- P. Pietravalle, "Pietro Ramaglia di Ripabottoni [Necrologia]", La Gazzetta della Provincia di Molise, n.31 18 luglio 1875
- Vittorio Donato Catapano, Medicina a Napoli nella prima metà dell'Ottocento, Liguori Editore, Napoli 1990
- Italo Testa, Le grandi figure della medicina molisana, Palladino editore, Campobasso 2010
