= Order of Friars Minor Capuchin =

Religious order of Franciscan friars

- Ordo Fratrum Minorum Capuccinorum (Latin)
- Common Capuchin logo
- Formation: Founded: 1209 by St. Francis of Assisi and until the reformation aimed at regaining the original spirit of St. Francis and the Original Habit of St. Francis remained as the part of main branches. Capuchin Reformation started in 1525.
- Founder: St. Francis of Assisi; Reformed as Capuchins by Matteo Serafini
- Type: Mendicant Order of Pontifical Right (for men)
- Headquarters: Via Piemonte 70, Rome, Italy
- Members: 10,349 (6,882 priests) (2020)
- Minister General: Roberto Genuin, OFMCap
- Post-nominal initials: OFMCap
- Website: ofmcap.org

The Order of Friars Minor Capuchin (/ˈkæpət͡ʃɪn/ KA-pə-chin; Latin: Ordo Fratrum Minorum Capuccinorum; postnominal abbr. OFMCap) is a religious order of Franciscan friars within the Catholic Church, one of three "First Orders" that reformed from the Franciscan Friars Minor Observant (OFMObs, now OFM), the other being the Conventuals (OFMConv). Franciscans reformed as Capuchins in 1525 with the purpose of regaining the original Habit (tunic) of St. Francis of Assisi and also for returning to a stricter observance of the rule established by Francis in 1209.

== History ==
=== Origins ===
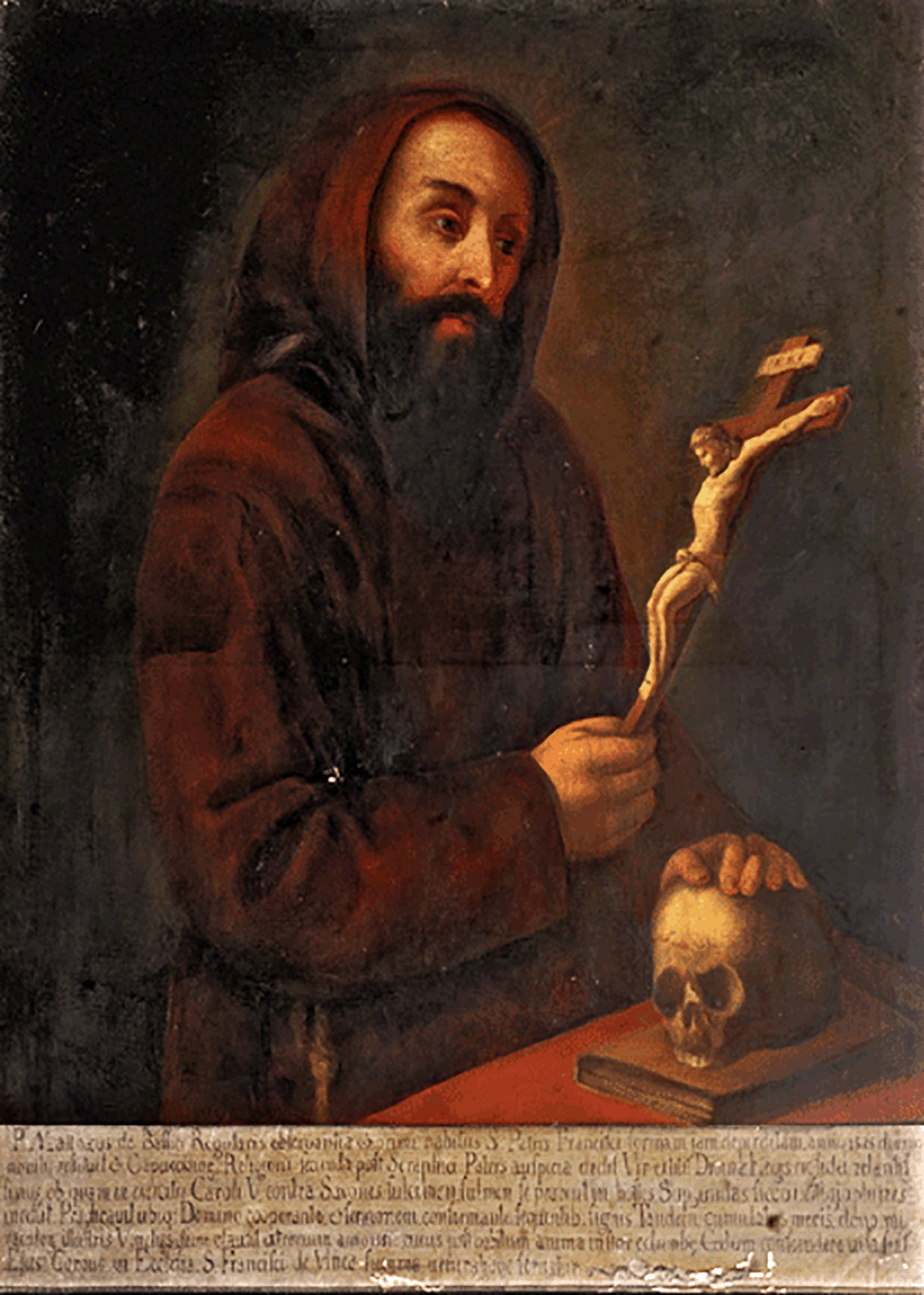
Matteo Bassi (1495–1552), co-founder of the Order of Friars Minor Capuchin

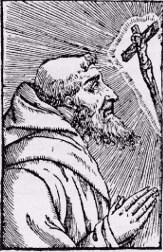
Bernardino Ochino (1487–1564), vicar general of the Capuchin Order

The Order arose in 1525 when Matteo da Bascio, an Observant Franciscan friar native to the Italian region of Marche, said he had been inspired by God with the idea that the manner of life led by the friars of his day was not the one which their founder, St. Francis of Assisi, had envisaged. He sought to return to the primitive way of life of solitude and penance, as practised by the founder of their Order.

His religious superiors tried to suppress these innovations and Matteo and his first companions were forced into hiding from Church authorities, who sought to arrest them for having abandoned their religious duties. They were given refuge by the Camaldolese monks, in gratitude for which they later adopted the hood (or cappuccio, capuche) worn by that Order—which was the mark of a hermit in that region of Italy—and the practise of wearing a beard. The popular name of their Order originates from this feature of their religious habit.

In 1528, Matteo obtained the approval of Pope Clement VII and was given permission to live as a hermit and to go about everywhere preaching to the poor. These permissions were not only for himself, but for all such as might join him in the attempt to restore the most literal observance possible of the Rule of St. Francis. Matteo and the original band were soon joined by others. Matteo and his companions were formed into a separate province, called the Hermit Friars Minor, as a branch of the Conventual Franciscans, but with a Vicar Provincial of their own, subject to the jurisdiction of the Minister General of the Conventuals. The Observants, the other branch of the Franciscan Order at that time, continued to oppose the movement.

=== Rules of the Order ===
In 1529, they had four houses and held their first General Chapter, at which their particular rules were drawn up. The eremitical idea was abandoned, but the life was to be one of extreme austerity, simplicity and poverty—in all things as near an approach to St Francis' ideals as was practicable. Neither the monasteries nor the Province should possess anything, nor were any loopholes left for evading this law. No large provision against temporal wants should be made, and the supplies in the house should never exceed what was necessary for a few days. Everything was to be obtained by begging, and the friars were not allowed even to touch money.

The communities were to be small, eight being fixed as the normal number and twelve as the limit. In furniture and clothing extreme simplicity was enjoined and the friars were discalced, required to go bare-footed—without even sandals. Like the Observants, the Capuchins wore a brown habit but of most simple form, i.e. only a tunic, with the distinctive large, pointed hood reaching to the waist attached to it, girdled by the traditional woolen cord with three knots. By visual analogy, the Capuchin monkey and the cappuccino style of coffee are both named after the shade of brown used for their habit.

Besides the canonical choral celebration of the Divine Office, a portion of which was recited at midnight, there were two hours of private prayer daily. The fasts and disciplines were rigorous and frequent. Their main external work was preaching and spiritual ministrations among the poor. In theology the Capuchins abandoned the later Franciscan School of Scotus and returned to the earlier school of St. Bonaventure.

=== Early setbacks ===
At the outset of its history, the Capuchins underwent a series of severe blows. Two of the founders left it: Matteo Serafini of Bascio (Matteo Bassi) returning to the Observants, while his first companion, on being replaced in the office of Vicar Provincial, became so insubordinate that he had to be expelled from the Order. Even more scandalously, the third Vicar General, Bernardino Ochino, left the Catholic faith in 1543 after fleeing to Switzerland, where he was welcomed by John Calvin, became a Calvinist pastor in Zürich, and married. Years later, claims that he had written in favor of polygamy and Unitarianism caused him to be exiled from that city and he fled again, first to Poland and then to Moravia, where he died.

As a result, the whole province came under the suspicion of heretical tendencies and Pope Paul III resolved to suppress it. He was dissuaded with difficulty, but the Capuchins were forbidden to preach.

=== Expansion ===
Despite earlier setbacks, the authorities were eventually satisfied as to the soundness of the general body of Capuchin friars and the permission to preach was restored. The movement then began to multiply rapidly, and by the end of the 16th century the Capuchins had spread all over the Catholic parts of Europe, so that in 1619 they were freed from their dependence on the Conventual Franciscans and became an independent Order. They are said to have had at that time 1500 houses divided into fifty provinces. They were one of the chief tools in the Catholic Counter-reformation, the aim of the order being to work among the poor, impressing the minds of the common people by the poverty and austerity of their life, and sometimes with sensationalist preaching such as their use of the supposedly possessed Marthe Brossier to arouse Paris against the Huguenots.

The activities of the Capuchins were not confined to Europe. From an early date they undertook missions to non-Catholics in America, Asia and Africa, and a college was founded in Rome for the purpose of preparing their members for foreign missions. Due to this strong missionary thrust, a large number of Capuchins have suffered martyrdom over the centuries. Activity in Europe and elsewhere continued until the close of the 18th century, when the number of Capuchin friars was estimated at 31,000.

=== Cimitero dei Cappuccini: The Capuchin Crypt ===
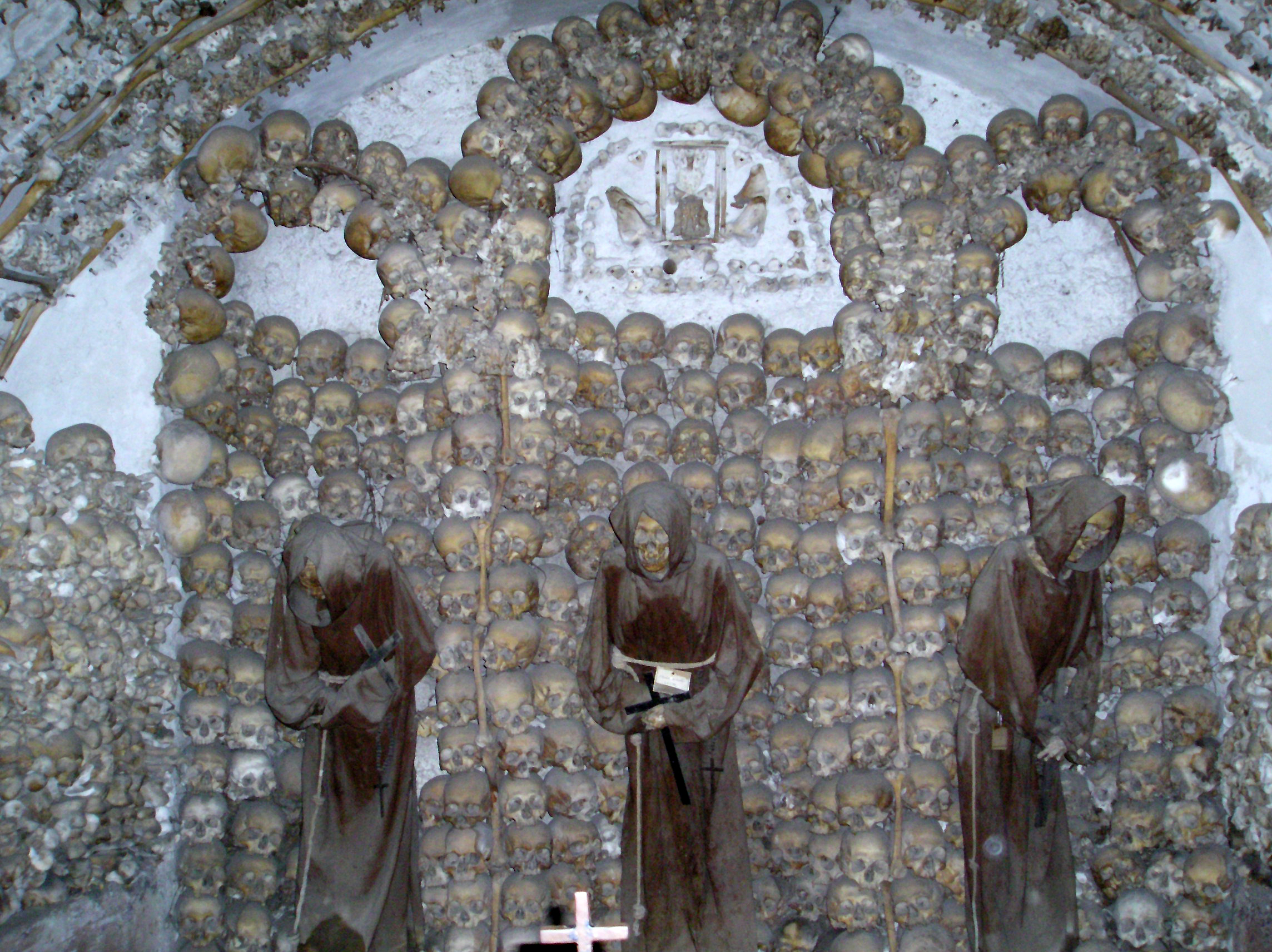
The remains of 4,000 friars adorn the ossuary of the Santa Maria della Concezione

The crypt is located just under the Church of Santa Maria della Concezione in Rome, a church commissioned by Pope Urban VIII in 1626. The pope's brother, Cardinal Antonio Barberini, who was of the Capuchin Order, in 1631 ordered the remains of thousands of Capuchin friars exhumed and transferred from the friary on the Via dei Lucchesi to the crypt. The bones were arranged along the walls in varied designs, and the friars began to bury their own dead here, as well as the bodies of poor Romans whose tomb was under the floor of the present Mass chapel. Here the Capuchins would come to pray and reflect each evening before retiring for the night.

The crypt, or ossuary, now contains the remains of 4,000 friars buried between 1500 and 1870, during which time the Roman Catholic Church permitted burial in and under churches. The underground crypt is divided into five chapels, lit only by dim natural light seeping in through cracks, and small fluorescent lamps. The crypt walls are decorated extensively with the remains, depicting various religious themes. Some of the skeletons are intact and draped with Franciscan habits, but for the most part, individual bones are used to create the elaborate ornamental designs.

A plaque in the chapel reads:

What you are now, we used to be.
What we are now, you will be.

Mark Twain visited the crypt in the summer of 1867, and begins Volume 2, Chapter 1, of The Innocents Abroad with five pages of his observations.

== Modern era ==
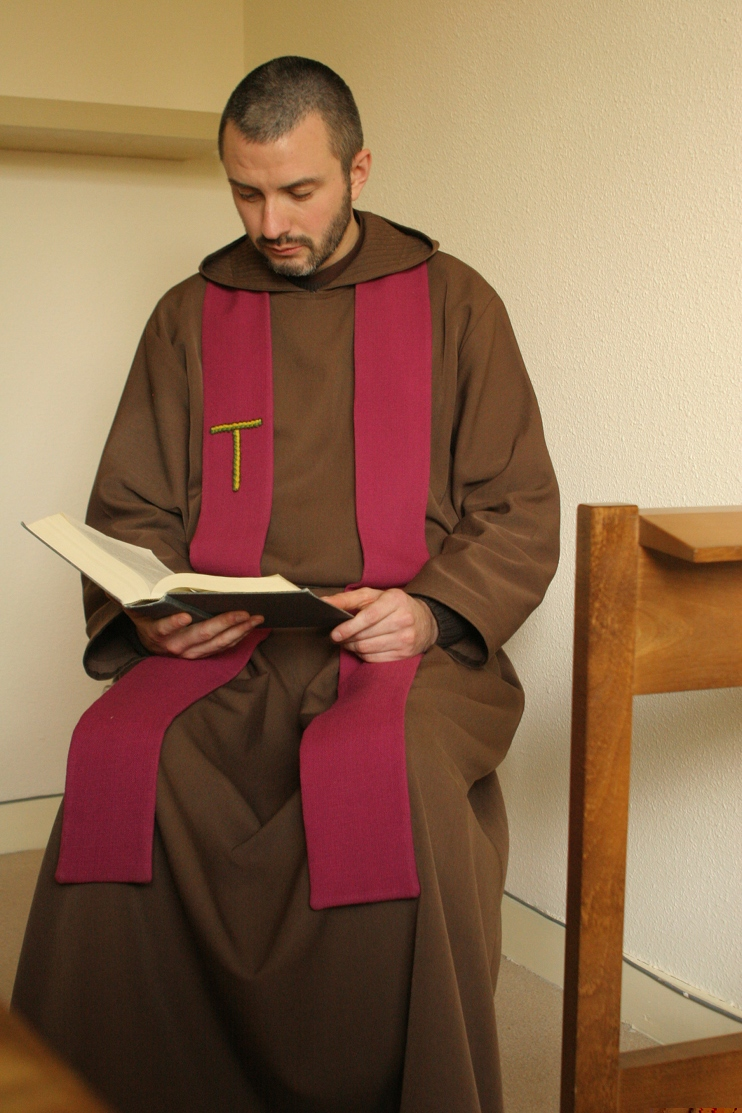
A Capuchin friar/priest ready to administer the Sacrament of Reconciliation (confession).

Like all other Orders, the Capuchins suffered severely from the secularizations and revolutions of the end of the 18th century and the first half of the 19th; but they survived the strain, and during the latter part of the 19th century rapidly recovered ground. At the beginning of the 20th century there were fifty provinces with some 500 friaries and 300 hospices or lesser houses; and the number of Capuchin friars, including lay brothers, was reckoned at 9,500. The Capuchins still keep up their missionary work and have some 200 missionary stations in all parts of the world, notably in India, Ethiopia, and parts of the former Ottoman Empire. Though "the poorest of all Orders", it has attracted into its ranks an extraordinary number of the highest nobility and even of royalty. The celebrated Theobald Mathew, the apostle of Temperance in Ireland, was a Capuchin friar.

The Capuchins attempted in 1987 to amend their constitution to open all offices to any member of the order, whether lay or ordained, but the Vatican's Congregation for Institutes of Consecrated Life insisted that the order was "clerical" and made it clear "that priests are ordinarily to be superiors at local, provincial and general levels".

In the Imperial Crypt, underneath the Church of the Capuchins in Vienna, over 140 members of the Habsburg dynasty are buried. The most recent burial in the crypt was in 2011 for Otto von Habsburg, the last crown prince of Austria-Hungary and eldest son of the last Austrian Emperor, the Blessed Charles of Austria.

As of June 2018, there were 10,480 Capuchins worldwide, of whom 7,070 were priests, living and working in 108 countries around the world: Africa: 1,357; South America: 1,657; North America: 664; Asia-Oceania: 2,339; Western Europe: 3,500; Central-Eastern Europe: 769. In Great Britain there are currently five Capuchin friaries, and eight in Ireland.

The worldwide head of the Order, called the Minister General, is currently friar Roberto Genuin.

=== India ===
The community of Bettiah Christians was founded after a Capuchin friar Joseph Mary cured the queen of Bettiah of a malady and was invited by Maharaja Dhurup Singh of the Bettiah Raj to stay. This appointment was approved by Pope Benedict XIV on 1 May 1742.

=== United States ===
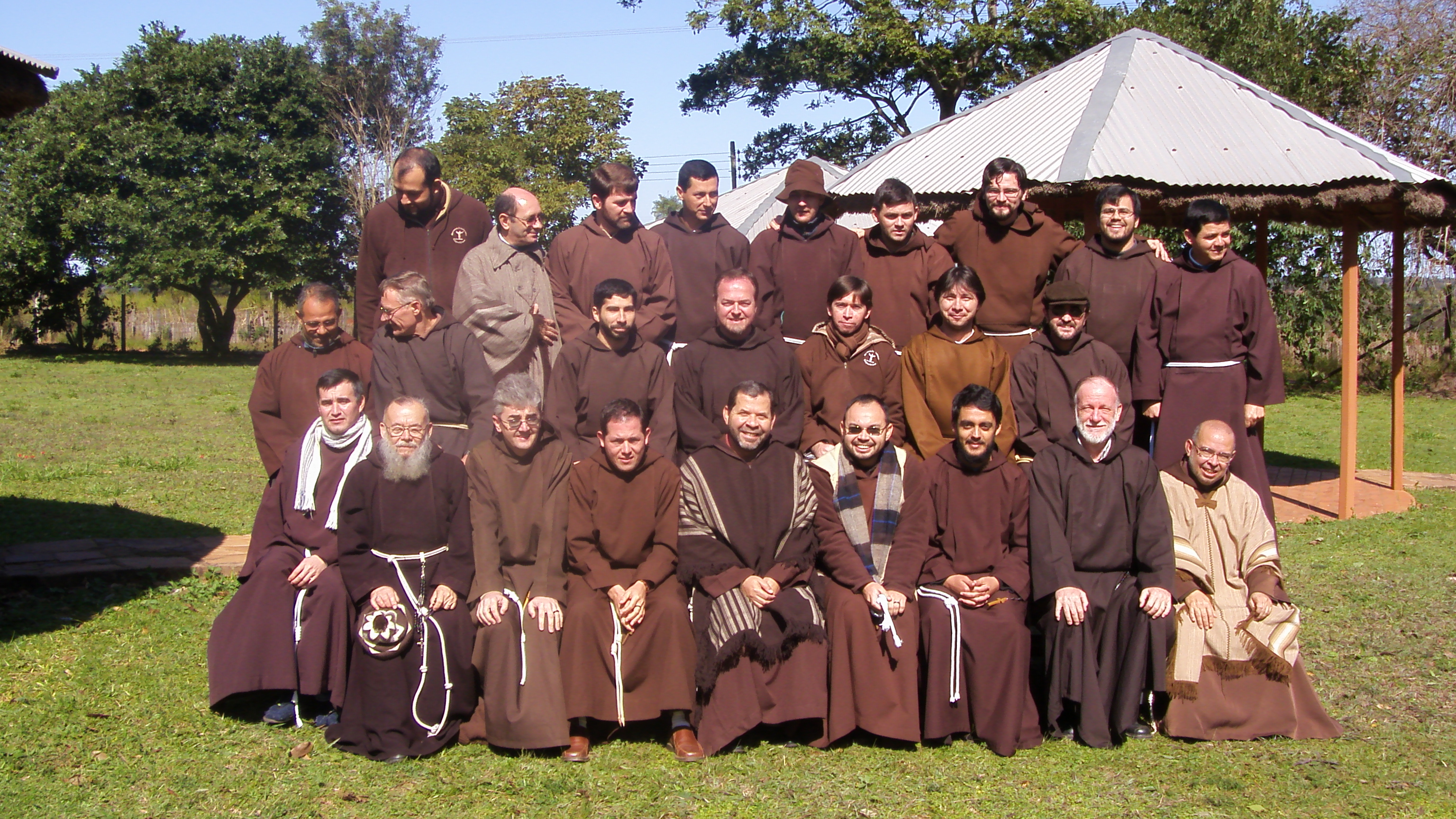
Capuchin friars in Paraguay, wearing the traditional Franciscan habit.

The United States has six provinces throughout the country. Together with the two provinces in Canada, the province of Australia and the Custody of the Mariana Islands/Hawaii they form the North American-Pacific Capuchin Conference (NAPCC).

==== Foundation ====
The Province of St. Joseph, originally the province of Calvary, headquartered in Detroit, Michigan, was one of the first two Capuchin Provinces to be established in the country in 1882. It was founded by Francis Haas (1826–1895) and Bonaventure Frey (1831–1912), two Swiss diocesan priests who arrived in the United States in September 1856, and were received into the then-Diocese of Milwaukee by Bishop John Henni, also a Swiss immigrant, and given charge of St. Nicholas Parish which they renamed Mount Calvary. They were later admitted to the Capuchin Order on December 2, 1857, by Antoine Gauchet of the Swiss Province who had been sent to admit them in order to establish the Order in the United States. The friars started St. Lawrence Seminary High School in 1861 at Mount Calvary, Wisconsin, a school that is still owned and operated by the Capuchin Order.

One of the friars of this province, Solanus Casey, was noted for the holiness of his life, serving as the porter of several Capuchin friaries both in Michigan and New York City for decades. As a miraculous healing attributed to him was approved by Pope Francis in mid-2017, he was beatified in Detroit at Ford Field on November 18, 2017. He had previously been declared Venerable in 1995 by Pope John Paul II. His tomb is in St. Bonaventure Monastery in Detroit, and is visited by thousands every year.

As of 2011, the province has 23 communities spread throughout the American Midwest, reaching from Michigan to Arizona. Additionally, there are friars of this province working in Central America, with a community serving in the Middle East.

==== Other jurisdictions ====
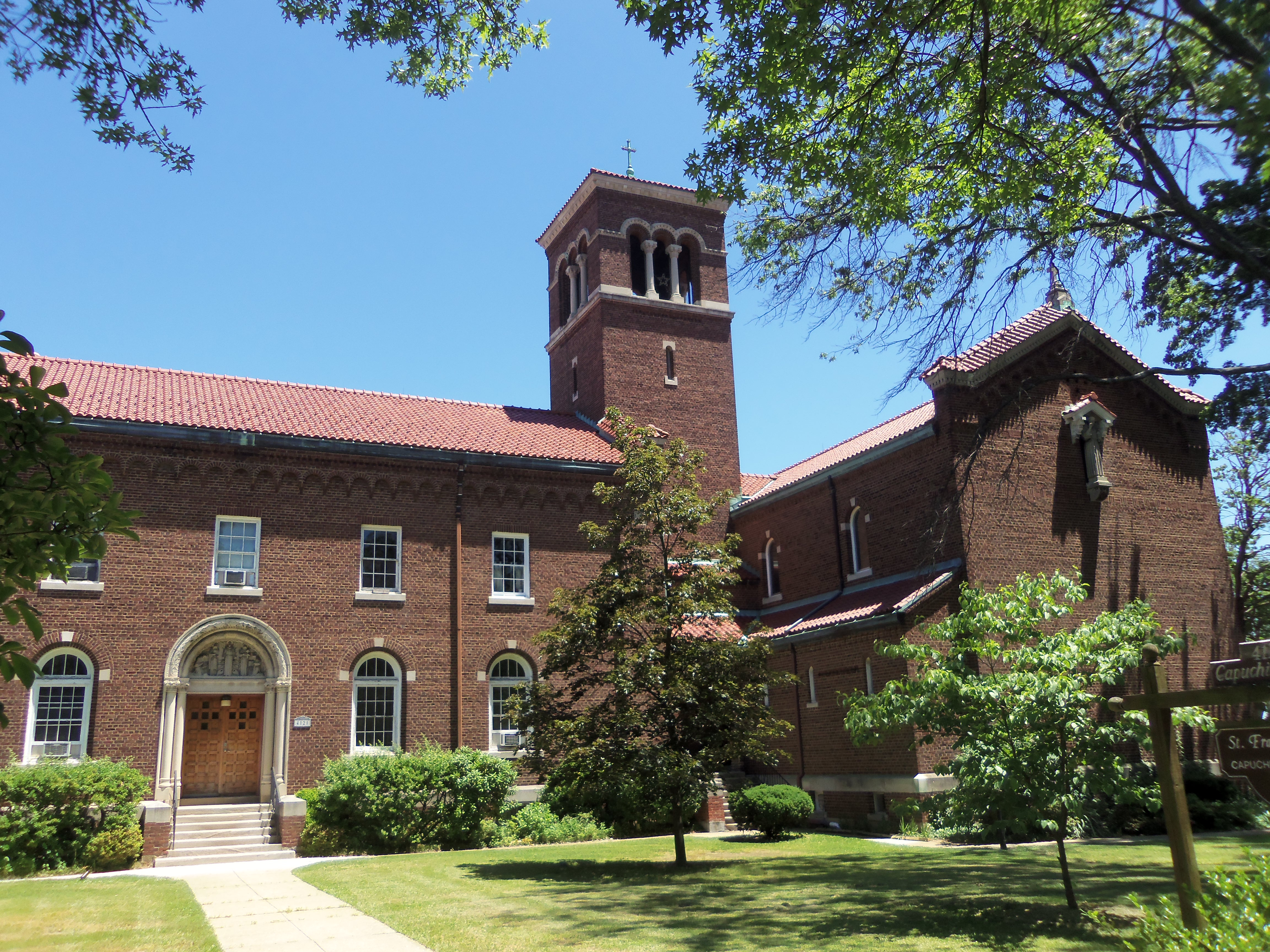
St. Francis Friary – Capuchin College in Washington, D.C. (St. Augustine Province)

- St. Joseph or Calvary (1882), based in Detroit, Michigan, covering the upper Midwest, from Detroit to Montana and from which came Blessed Solanus Casey.
- St. Augustine (1882), based in Pittsburgh, Pennsylvania, to which Cardinal Sean O'Malley belongs.
- Stigmata (ca. 1913), based in Union City, New Jersey, founded by friars from the Tuscan region of Italy with 8 communities on the East Coast, with friaries in Beacon, New York, Hackensack, New Jersey, Hoboken, New Jersey, Wilmington, Delaware (2), Atlanta, Georgia, and Miami, Florida.
- St. Mary of New York and New England (1952), based in White Plains, New York, with 18 fraternities on the East Coast, covering New England and New York. They supervise the Custody of Japan and the Custody of Guam.
- St. Conrad or Mid-America (1977), based in Denver, Colorado, serving Illinois, Colorado, Kansas, Missouri and Texas, with missionaries in Papua New Guinea; a friar of this province, Charles J. Chaput, was installed as the Archbishop of Philadelphia on 8 September 2011.
- Our Lady of Angels (1979), Western America, based in Burlingame, California. Seven communities in California, with four communities in Mexico which became the Custody of St. Juan Diego in December 2011.
- Our Lady, Star of the Sea Vice-Province/Custody (1982), Guam and Hawaii, this division is dependent on St. Mary Province.

== Capuchin Poor Clares ==
The Capuchin Poor Clares are cloistered nuns of the Order of St. Clare, who form the female branch of the Capuchin Order. They were founded in 1538 in Naples by the Blessed Maria Laurentia Longo, who was Abbess of the Poor Clare monastery of that city. She and the other nuns of that community embraced the then-new Capuchin reform movement, and so austere was the life that they were called "Sisters of Suffering". The Order soon spread to France, Spain and beyond. They live according to the same rules and regulations as the Capuchin friars, and are held as members of the friars' provinces.

In the United States, as of 2012, there are five monasteries of this Order. There are about 50 nuns in these communities, which are located in: Denver and Pueblo in Colorado, Alamo and Amarillo (the first, founded 1981) in Texas, and Wilmington, Delaware. The monasteries were almost all founded from Mexico, where there are some 1,350 Capuchin nuns in 73 monasteries. The monastery in Pueblo is a foundation of the monastery in Amarillo. Together they form the Federation of Our Lady of the Angels.

== Appearance ==
The Capuchins are unique for a Catholic religious order in that the growing of natural, untrimmed beards features as part of its first Constitution, which states as the reason, the beard is "manly, austere, natural, an imitation of Christ and the saints of our Order, and despised." This makes the Capuchin friars stand out in particular from the secular clergy of the Latin Church, who have no rule on such matters. In more recent times, since the Second Vatican Council, the beard has no longer been mandatory but is still common. Like other Franciscans, the friars wear a plain brown tunic with a hood, a cord fastened around the waist, and sandals (or shoes).

== Saints, Blesseds, and other holy people ==
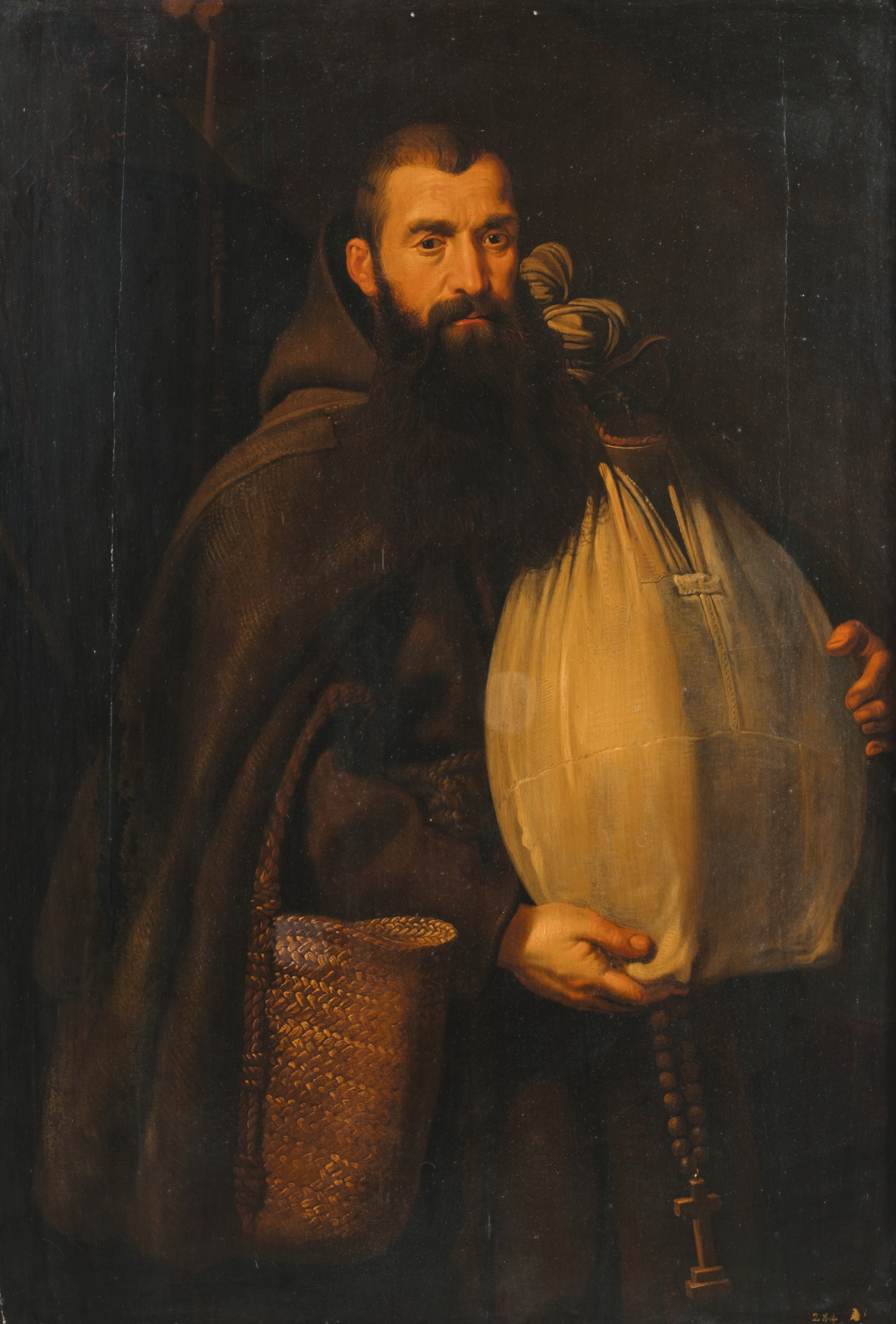
Felix of Cantalice, the first Capuchin to be declared a saint by the Catholic Church

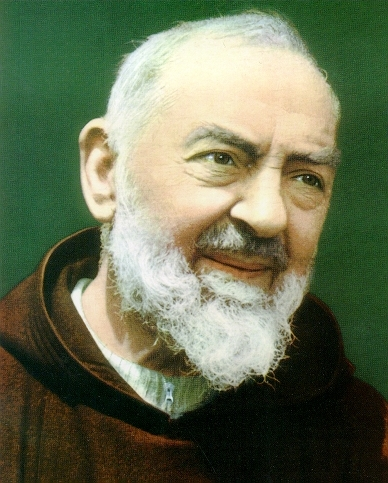
Saint Padre Pio of Pietrelcina, a famous Capuchin stigmatist friar.

=== Saints ===
- Felice da Cantalice (18 May 1515 – 18 May 1587), the first Capuchin to be named a saint, canonized on 22 May 1712.
- Serafino da Montegranaro (Felice Rapagnano) (c. 1540 – October 12, 1604), laybrother, canonized on 16 July 1767.
- Giuseppe da Leonessa (Eufranio Desiderio) (8 January 1556 – February 4, 1612), friar, canonized on 29 June 1746.
- Lorenzo da Brindisi (Giulio Cesare Russo) (22 July 1559 – 22 July 1619), Doctor of the Church, canonized on 8 December 1881.
- Fidelis von Sigmaringen (Mark Roy/Rey) (c. 1577 – 24 April 1622), German friar martyred during the Counter-Reformation, canonized on 29 June 1746.
- Camillus de Lellis, (25 May 1550 – 14 July 1614) was priest from Kingdom of Napleswho founded the Camillians, a religious order dedicated to the care of the sick, canonized on 29 June 1746.
- Bernardo da Corleone (Filippo Latini) (6 February 1605 – 12 January 1667), Sicilian friar, canonized on 10 June 2001.
- Angelo d’Acri (Luca Antonio Falcone) (19 October 1669 – 30 October 1739), "Angel of Peace" and the "Apostle of the South", canonized on 15 October 2017.
- Crispino da Viterbo (Pietro Fioretti) (13 November 1668 – 19 May 1750), professed religious, canonized on 20 June 1982.
- Ignazio da Santhià (Lorenzo Maurizio Belvisotti) (5 June 1686 – 22 September 1770), priest, canonized on 19 May 2002
- Ignazio da Laconi (Vincenzo Peis) (10 December 1701 - 11 May 1781), Sardinian professed religious, canonized on 21 October 1951.
- Felice di Nicosia (Filippo Giacomo Amoroso) (5 November 1715 – 31 May 1787), friar, canonized on 23 October 2005.
- Francesco Maria da Camporosso (Giovanni Croese) (27 December 1804 - 17 September 1866), professed religious, canonized on 9 December 1962.
- Konrad von Parzham (Johann Birndorfer) (22 December 1818 – 21 April 1894), German laybrother, canonized on 20 May 1934.
- Leopoldo Mandić da Castelnuovo (Bogdan Ivan Mandić) (12 May 1866 – 30 July 1942), Croatian priest, canonized on 16 October 1983.
- Padre Pio di Pietrelcina (Francesco Forgione) (25 May 1887 – 23 September 1968), stigmatist and mystic, canonized on 16 June 2002.

=== Blesseds ===
- Geremia da Valacchia (Ion Costist) (29 June 1556 - 26 February 1625), Romanian laybrother, beatified on 30 October 1983.
- Benedetto da Urbino (Marco Passionei) (13 September 1560 – 30 April 1625), priest, beatified on 10 February 1867.
- Tommaso da Olera (Tommaso Acerbis) (c. 1563 - 3 May 1631), priest during the Counter-Reformation, beatified on 21 September 2013.
- Cassien de Nantes (Gonzalve Vaz Lopez-Netto) (14 January 1607 – 7 August 1638), martyred for preaching to the Copts, beatified on 1 January 1905.
- Agathange de Vendôme (François Nouri) (31 July 1598 – 7 August 1638), martyred for preaching to the Copts, beatified on 1 January 1905.
- Bernardo da Offida (Domenico Peroni) (7 November 1604 – 22 August 1694), professed religious, beatified on 25 May 1795.
- Marco d'Aviano (Carlo Domenico Cristofori) (17 November 1631 – 13 August 1699), preacher, beatified on 27 April 2003.
- Apollinaire de Pozat (Jean-Jacques Morel) (12 June 1739 – 2 September 1792), Martyr of the French Revolution, beatified on 17 October 1926.
- Jacques-Louis de Besançon (Jean-Baptiste-Xavier Loir) (11 March 1720 - 19 May 1794), Martyr of the French Revolution, beatified on 1 October 1995.
- Sébastien de Nancy (François François) (17 January 1749 - 10 August 1794), Martyr of the French Revolution, beatified on 1 October 1995.
- Protais de Séez (Jean Bourdon) (3 April 1747 - 23 August 1794), Martyr of the French Revolution, beatified on 1 October 1995.
- Diego José de Cádiz (José Francisco López-Caamaño y García Pérez) (30 March 1743 - 24 March 1801), Spanish missionary, beatified on 22 April 1894.
- Josep de Igualada (Josep Tous Soler) (31 March 1811 - 27 February 1871), Spanish priest and founder of the Capuchin Sisters of the Mother of the Divine Shepherd, beatified on 25 April 2010.
- Innocenzo da Berzo (Giovanni Scalvinoni) (19 March 1844 - 3 March 1890), priest, beatified on 12 November 1961.
- Arsenio da Trigolo (Giuseppe Antonio Migliavacca) (13 June 1849 – 10 December 1909), priest, beatified on 7 October 2017.
- Līūnār (Leonard) of B'abdāt (Yūsuf Habīb Melkī) (4 October 1881 – 11 June 1915), Lebanese martyr, beatified on 4 June 2022.
- Honorat da Biała (Florentyn Wacław Jan Stefan Koźmiński) (16 October 1829 – 16 December 1916), Polish priest and founder of sixteen religious congregations, beatified on 16 October 1988.
- Thūmā (Thomas) of B'abdāt (Jirays H̱anā S̱āleẖ) (3 May 1879 – 28 February 1917), Lebanese martyr, beatified on 4 June 2022.
- Andrea di Campodarsego (Giacinto Bonaventura Longhin) (22 November 1863 – 26 June 1936), Bishop of Treviso, beatified on 20 October 2002.
- Benet Domènech Bonet of Santa Coloma de Gramenet and 2 Companions (died 24 and 27 July and 6 August 1936), Martyrs of the Spanish Civil War from Manresa, beatified on 6 November 2021.
- Jose Maria of Manila (Eugenio del Sanz-Orozco Mortera) (5 September 1880 – 17 August 1936), Filipino friar martyred during the Spanish Civil War, beatified on 13 October 2013.
- Aurelio Ample Alcaide and 11 Companions (died between 10 August to 12 October 1936), Martyrs of the Spanish Civil War from Valencia, beatified on 11 March 2001.
- Frederic Tarrés Puigpelat of Berga and 25 Companions (died between 28 July 1936 to 17 February 1937), Martyrs of the Spanish Civil War from Barcelona, beatified on 21 November 2015.
- Andrés González-Díez González-Núñez of Palazuelo and 31 Companions (died between 31 July 1936 to 19 May 1937), Martyrs of the Spanish Civil War, beatified on 13 October 2013. (this group also includes Fernando Olmedo Reguera)
- Anicet Adalbert Kopliński (30 July 1875 – 16 October 1941), Martyr of the Nazi Occupation of Poland during the Second World War, beatified on 13 June 1999.
- Fidelis Chojnacki (1 November 1906 – 9 July 1942), Martyr of the Nazi Occupation of Poland during the Second World War, beatified on 13 June 1999.
- Florian (Jozef) Stępniak (3 January 1912 – 29 September 1942), Martyr of the Nazi Occupation of Poland during the Second World War, beatified on 13 June 1999.
- Feliks (Symforian) Ducki (10 May 1888 - 11 April 1942), Martyr of the Nazi Occupation of Poland during the Second World War, beatified on 13 June 1999.
- Hieronim (Fidelis) Chojnacki (1 November 1906 - 9 July 1942), Martyr of the Nazi Occupation of Poland during the Second World War, beatified on 13 June 1999.
- Jozef (Henryk) Krzysztofik (28 March 1908 - 4 August 1942), Martyr of the Nazi Occupation of Poland during the Second World War, beatified on 13 June 1999.
- Jacques Ghazir Haddad (1 February 1875 - 26 June 1954), Lebanese friar and founder of the Franciscan Sisters of the Cross, beatified on 22 June 2008.
- Leopoldo de Alpandeire (Francisco Tomás de San Juan Bautista Márquez y Sánchez) (24 June 1864 – 9 February 1956), Spanish friar, beatified on 12 September 2010.
- Nicola da Gesturi (Giovanni Angelo Salvatore Medda) (4 August 1882 – 8 June 1958), priest, beatified on 3 October 1999.
- Solanus Casey (Bernard Francis Casey) (25 November 1870 – 31 July 1957), American professed religious, beatified on 18 November 2017.

=== Venerables ===
- Gesualdo of Reggio Calabria (Giuseppe Melacrinò) (18 October 1725 - 28 January 1803), priest, declared Venerable on 2 April 1982.
- Carlo Maria of Abbiategrasso (Gaetano Antonio Vigevano) (30 August 1825 - 21 February 1859), priest, declared Venerable on 13 December 2021
- Anastasius of Altwis (Joseph Alois Hartmann) (24 February 1803 - 24 April 1866), Swiss Capuchin and Apostolic Vicar of Patna, declared Venerable on 21 December 1998
- Esteban of Adoáin (Francisco Pedro Marcuello Zabalza) (11 October 1808 - 7 October 1880), priest, declared Venerable on 21 December 1989
- Marie-Antoine of Lavaur (François-Léon Clergue) (23 December 1825 - 8 February 1907), French priest, declared Venerable on 23 January 2020
- Marcellino of Capradosso (Giovanni Maoloni) (22 September 1873 - 26 February 1909), professed religious, declared Venerable on 8 November 2017.
- Francisco Simón Ródenas of Orihuela (2 October 1849 - 22 August 1914), Bishop of Santa Marta, declared Venerable on 3 April 2014
- Angelico of Caltanisetta (Vincenzo Lipàni) (28 December 1842 - 9 July 1920), priest and founder of the Franciscan Sisters of the Lord, declared Venerable on 5 July 2019
- Daniele di Samarate (Felice Rossini) (12 June 1876 - 19 May 1924), priest, declared Venerable on 23 March 2017.
- Luis of Masamagrell (José María Amigó Ferrer) (17 October 1854 – 1 October 1934), Bishop of Segorbe and founder of the Capuchin Tertiary Fathers and Brothers of Our Lady of Sorrows and Capuchin Tertiary Sisters of the Holy Family (also known as Amigonians), declared Venerable on 13 June 1992.
- Daniele of Torricella (Dario Coppini) (1 September 1867 - 10 December 1945), priest, declared Venerable on 2 April 1993
- Giacomo of Balduina (Beniamino Filon) (2 August 1900 - 21 July 1948), priest, declared Venerable on 16 June 2017
- Ante of Razbojine (Josip Tomičić) (23 March 1901 - 25 November 1981), Croatian priest, declared Venerable on 14 March 2024
- Manuel of Beizama (Alejandro Labaka Ugarte) (19 April 1920 - 21 July 1987), Apostolic Vicar of Aguarico declared Venerable on 22 May 2025
- Damiano of Bozzano (Pio Giannotti) (5 November 1898 - 31 May 1997), priest, declared Venerable on 6 April 2019
- Gianfranco Maria of Gignese (Gianfranco Chiti) (6 May 1921 - 20 November 2004), priest, declared Venerable on 24 January 2024

=== Servants of God ===
- Girolamo of Cammarata (Alessandro Caruso) (c. 1549 - 22 February 1627), priest
- Tommaso of San Donato (Giovanni Battista Ricci) (26 January 1578 - 22 March 1648), priest
- Fiacre of Kilkenny (John Tobin) (c. 1620 - 6 March 1656), Martyr of the Protestant Reformation in Ireland
- Giovanni Francesco of Lucca (Iacopo Torre [Orsucci]) (29 February 1592 - 14 January 1665), priest
- John Baptist of Ulster (James Dowdall) (c. 1626 - 20 February 1710), Martyr of the Protestant Reformation in Ireland
- Antonio of Olivadi (Giuseppe Antonio Pontieri) (1 January 1653 - 22 February 1720), priest
- Georg of Augsburg (Andreas Erhardt) (25 November 1696 - 7 October 1762), German professed religious
- Ludovico of Mazzarino (Carmelo Giovanni Matteo Napoli) (27 June 1708 - 23 April 1764), priest
- Felice Maria of Marola (Alessandro Faggioni) (8 February 1713 - 25 September 1787), priest
- Benoît of Beaucaire and 4 Companions (died 14 June 1790), Martyrs of the French Revolution from the Diocese of Nimes
- Francesco of Lagonegro (Giacomo Antonio Scalderone) (3 March 1717 - 2 January 1804), priest
- Antonio of Rome (Domenico Galli) (5 January 1746 - 27 October 1813), priest
- Gaetano di Messina (Santi Lentini) (15 August 1807 - 9 January 1878), founder of the Franciscan Sisters of Our Lady of Good Counsel
- Vital Maria of Pernabuco (Antônio Gonçalves de Oliveira) (27 November 1844 - 4 July 1878), Bishop of Olinda, declared as a Servant of God on 3 November 1994.
- Giuseppe Maria of Palermo (Vincenzo Diliberto) (2 February 1864 - 1 January 1886), novice
- Fortunat of Tours (Henri Caumont) (10 December 1871 - 6 August 1930), Bishop of Ajmer and founder of the Prabhudasi Sisters of Ajmer – Handmaids of the Lord and Mission Sisters of Ajmer
- Damiano Sfascia of Cingoli (6 May 1875 - 23 August 1936), priest, declared as a Servant of God on 6 July 2002
- Pietro of San Pietro Clarenza (Pietro Privitera) (8 November 1881 - 4 October 1939), professed religious
- Charles of Ploemeur (Alfred le Neouannis) (8 March 1870 - 6 August 1941), priest, declared as a Servant of God on 16 December 2020
- Inácio of Ribeirão Preto (João dal Monte) (28 August 1897 - 29 May 1963), Bishop of Guaxupé in Brazil, declared as a Servant of God in 2017
- Casiano María of Madrid (Juan Morera Coll) (20 October 1892 - 28 June 1965), priest
- Gabriele of Frazzanò (Antonio Machì) (7 June 1907 - 17 April 1973), priest, declared as a Servant of God on 14 December 2020
- John Peter Savarinayagam (29 May 1941 - 2 March 1979), Indian priest, declared as a Servant of God on 31 October 2019
- Romain of Saint-Claude (Louis Coutty) (7 February 1905 - 14 June 1979), French Capuchin
- Dionisio of Silvano dʼOrba (Giovanni Mazzucco) (8 March 1907 - 8 January 1990), priest
- Nazareno of Pula (Giovanni Zucca) (21 January 1911 - 29 February 1992), professed religious, declared as a Servant of God on 27 November 2003
- Domingo of Tacuarembó (Umberto Orsetti Andrea) (4 May 1899 - 8 January 1994), priest
- Daniele of San Giovanni Rotondo (Michele Natale) (28 June 1914 - 6 July 1994), priest, declared as a Servant of God in 2013
- Alfred of Moodahadu (Peter John Roche) (3 April 1924 - 31 December 1996), Indian priest, declared as a Servant of God on 26 March 2021
- Nemésio of Veranópolis (José Bernardi) (9 March 1927 - 4 February 2016), Brazilian priest, declared as a Servant of God on 3 February 2022

== Other notable Capuchins ==
- Jeremiah Benettis, 18th-century Italian writer
- Cesare Bonizzi, heavy metal band leader and singer
- Raniero Cantalamessa, author, speaker, and Preacher to the Papal Household
- Charles J. Chaput, Archbishop of Philadelphia (2011–2020), Archbishop of Denver (1997–2011)
- Sebastian Englert, friar, archaeologist and ethnographer of Easter Island (1888–1969)
- Patri Fidiel, Maltese poet
- Henri de Grèzes, religious historian and writer
- Beatus Kinyaiya, Archbishop of Dodoma (2014–present)
- Seán Patrick O'Malley, cardinal, Archbishop of Boston (2003–2024)
- Vinkenti Peev, Bulgarian priest
- Wolfgang Pisa, Bishop of Lindi (2022–present)
- Lucian Pulvermacher, schismatic sedevacantist
- Jude Thaddaeus Ruwa'ichi, Bishop of Mbulu (1999–2005), Bishop of Dodoma (2005–2010), President Tanzania Episcopal Conference (2006–2012), Archbishop of Mwanza (2010–2018), coadjutor Archbishop of Dar es Salaam (2018–2019), Archbishop of Dar es Salaam (2019–present)
- Antonio de Sedella, chief of the Spanish Inquisition in Louisiana (1788), rector of St. Louis Cathedral (1795–1829)
- Emerich Sinelli, Prince-Bishop of Vienna (1681–1685)
- Yannis Spiteris, Archbishop of Corfu (2003–2020)
- Dávid Bartimej Tencer, Bishop of Reykjavik (2015–present)
- François Leclerc du Tremblay, friar and politician referred to as the "éminence grise" as the confidant and power "behind the scenes" of Richelieu (1577–1638)
