= Arnold Rice Rich =

American pathologist (1893–1968)

Dr. Arnold Rice Rich
- Born: March 28, 1893; Birmingham, Alabama
- Died: April 17, 1968 (aged 75); Baltimore, Maryland
- Citizenship: United States of America
- Education: University of Virginia; Johns Hopkins Medical School
- Known for: Rich focus, Hamman-Rich syndrome
- Scientific career
- Fields: Pathology

Arnold Rice Rich (March 28, 1893 – April 17, 1968) was an American pathologist.

== Career ==
Born March 28, 1893, in Birmingham, Alabama, Rich attended the University of Virginia, majoring in biology, and then the Johns Hopkins Medical School in Baltimore, Maryland, from which he received his M.D. degree in 1919. He remained associated with Hopkins the rest of his career. He was appointed Chairman of the Department of Pathology and pathologist-in-chief of the Johns Hopkins Hospital in 1944, until he retired in 1958.

== Work ==
Rich had broad interests in medicine. Among his many contributions, he classified jaundice, helped understand the formation of bile pigment, studied the relationship between hypersensitivity and immunity, especially in tuberculosis (on which he was one of the reigning experts) and discovered the phagocytic function of the Gaucher cell, the hallmark of Gaucher's disease.

A number of diseases or conditions are named after Rich, including:

- Hamman-Rich syndrome and the
- Rich focus

== Personal life ==
Rich was Jewish. His father Samuel Rice was an Ashkenazi immigrant from Košice in the Austro-Hungarian Empire (present day Slovakia), while his mother was a Sephardi Jew from Vicksburg, Mississippi. Samuel Rice owned a successful shoe store in Birmingham. In 1925 Arnold married the pianist and composer Helen Jones. They had two daughters: the poet Adrienne Rich (1929-2012 ) and the writer Cynthia Rich (1933- ). Arnold Rice Rich died April 17, 1968, in Baltimore, Maryland.
