= Matteo da Bascio =

Italian Franciscan religious leader

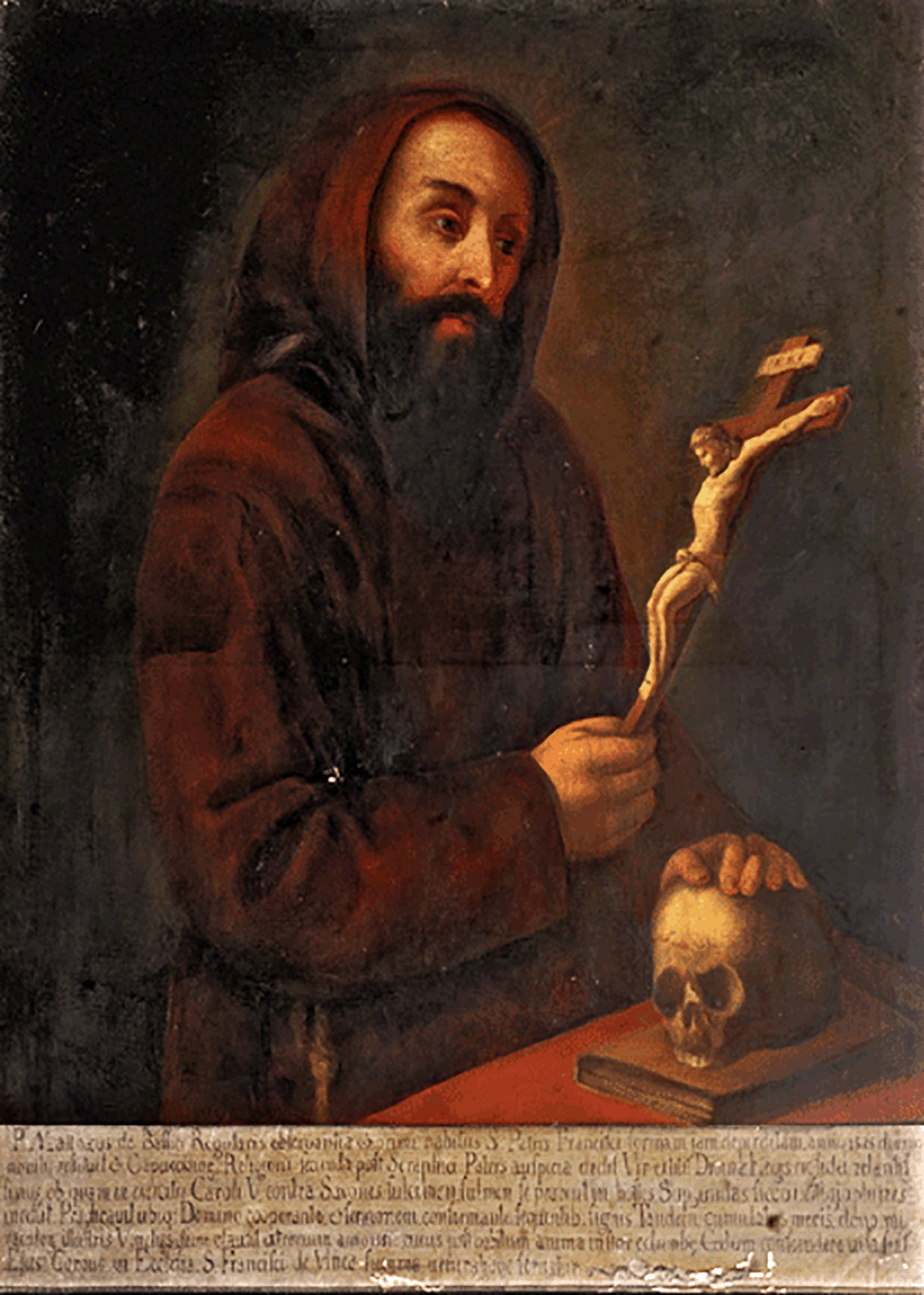
Matteo da Bascio

Matteo da Bascio, born Matteo Serafini (1495–1552), was the co-founder and first Superior-General of the Order of Friars Minor Capuchin, the principal branch of the Franciscans issued from the Reform of the Observance.

== Background ==
At the beginning of the sixteenth century, the Franciscans were divided into the two distinct families of Conventuals and Observants. The difference between the two families was their adhesion to the primitive ideal of Franciscan poverty and simplicity; the Conventuals accepted revenues by papal dispensation; the Observants refused fixed revenues and lived by casual alms. At least such was the principle; but in practice, the Observants had come themselves to relax the principle under various legal devices. Thus, though they would not accept money themselves, they allowed secular individuals to accept money for their use; they accepted chaplaincies to which were affixed regular stipends. To those who looked to the primitive custom of the order, such acceptances seemed inappropriate. Hence, it was that the Observants, after breaking away from the Conventuals, themselves gave rise to various reforms which aimed at a more perfect return to the primitive type.

== Life ==
Matteo Serafini was born in 1495, at Molino di Bascio in the Diocese of Montefeltro in the Duchy of Urbino. At the age of seventeen, he entered the Order of the Observants at Montefiorentino. According to one tradition, the friar had been attending a funeral and was returning to his convent when he met a beggar by the wayside, barely clad. Moved with compassion, Serafini gave the beggar part of his own clothing. Shortly afterwards, Serafini was in prayer when he heard a voice, which three times admonished him, saying, "Observe the Rule to the letter". He sought a more austere life away from the call of possessions, position, and wealthy benefactors to spend a life as a hermit, and went about barefoot. His superiors tried to suppress these innovations. It is said that Pope Leo X had given him permission to institute a reform amongst the Observants; but if so, Serafini did not avail himself of the permission, perhaps because of the death of that pontiff.

Serafini and his first companions were forced into hiding from church authorities, who sought to arrest them for having abandoned their religious duties. They were given refuge by the Camaldolese monks, in gratitude for which they later adopted the hood (or cappuccio) worn by that Order — which was the mark of a hermit in that region of Italy — and the practice of wearing a beard. The popular name of their order originates from this feature of their religious habit. The aspiration to observe the rule to the letter was the one compelling motive of the reform, and the taking of the habit with the long pointed hood was the symbol of this aspiration.

In 1525, Serafini was a priest and missionary, being a member of the Archdiocese of Ancona. That was a year of Jubilee, so he went to Rome and while there obtained from Pope Clement VII leave to wear the Capuchin habit and to live in strictest poverty, and also the permission to live as a hermit and to go about everywhere preaching to the poor. These permissions were not only for himself, but for all such as might join him in the attempt to restore the most literal observance possible of Francis’s rule. Matteo was soon joined by others. The Observants opposed the movement, but the Conventuals supported it, and so Serafini and his companions were formed into a congregation, called the Hermit Friars Minor, as a branch of the Conventual Franciscans, but with a vicar of their own, subject to the jurisdiction of the general of the Conventuals.

On 3 July 1528, the Pope issued the bull Religionis zelus, by which the new reform was canonically approved and placed under the nominal jurisdiction of the Conventuals. The name "Capuchin", at first given by the people to the new Franciscan friars, was afterwards officially adopted.

In April 1529, the new order held its first chapter at Albacina, where Serafini was elected vicar-general by acclamation. A code of constitutions, which was to serve as a basis for the Reform, was elaborated. But the founder did not hold his charge very long. After visiting his brethren, wishing to resume his apostolic career, and perhaps feeling powerless against the difficulties which menaced his disciples, he resigned his office. Thenceforward, he took no part in the government of the order.

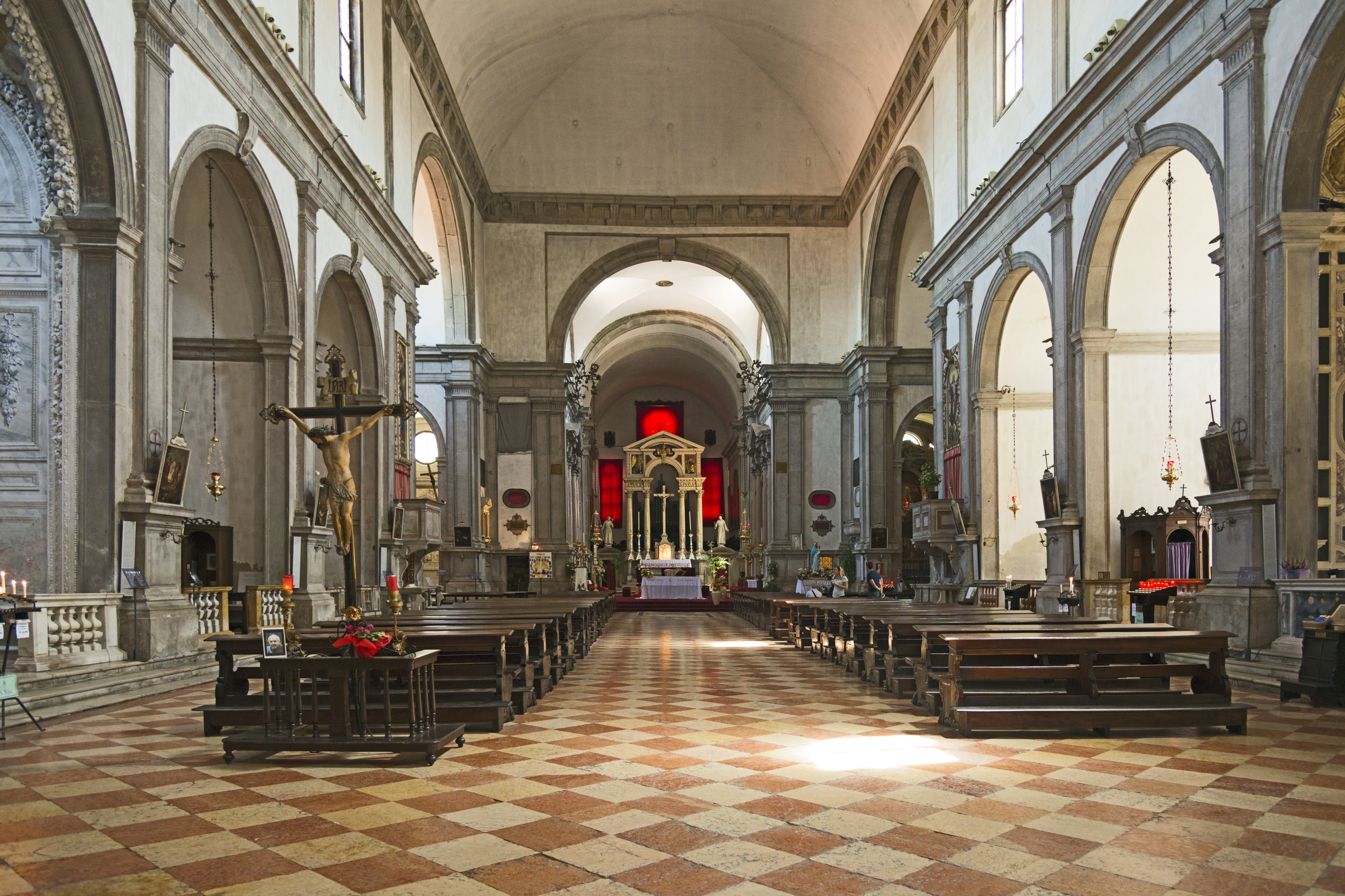
San Francesco della Vigna, Venice

About 1537, Serafini returned to the obedience of the Observants, through fear of incurring some ecclesiastical censure. As it was, these last had obtained, at different times, bulls or decrees against the new reform.

Serafini preached through the whole of Italy and part of Germany. He died at Venice, in the midst of his labours, and was buried there in the church of San Francesco della Vigna in the presence of a vast concourse of people attracted by his reputation as a saint. The following eulogy by Arthur du Monstier is read in the Franciscan Martyrologium (3 August): "There died at Venice, Blessed Matthew, confessor, founder of the congregation of Capuchins. His continual fastings, vigils and prayer, his most high poverty and ardent zeal for souls, lastly his extraordinary holiness and the gift of miracles made his memory glorious".
