= Federal prosecution of Donald Trump (election obstruction case) =

United States v. Trump
- Seal of the U.S. District Court for the District of Columbia
- Court: United States District Court for the District of Columbia
- Full case name: United States of America v. Donald J. Trump
- Docket nos.: 1:23-cr-00257-TSC
- Charge: Conspiracy to defraud the United States; Conspiracy to obstruct an official proceeding; Obstruction of and attempt to obstruct an official proceeding; Conspiracy against rights

Court membership
- Judge sitting: Tanya S. Chutkan (District Judge)

United States of America v. Donald J. Trump was a federal criminal case against Donald Trump, former president of the United States from 2017 to 2021 (and the current president of the United States since 2025), regarding his alleged participation in attempts to overturn the 2020 U.S. presidential election, including his involvement in the January 6 Capitol attack.

Trump pled not guilty for having attempted to overturn the results of the election through a plot in which pro-Trump slates of fake electors would be created. Trump pressured then-vice president Mike Pence to count the fake electors instead of the electors certified by state governments. The Department of Justice opened an investigation in January 2022 into the plot, expanding it to encompass January 6, 2021. In November 2022, Attorney General Merrick Garland appointed Jack Smith to lead a special counsel investigation encompassing the investigations into attempts to overturn the election and Trump's handling of government documents.

On August 1, 2023, a grand jury indicted Trump in the District of Columbia U.S. District Court on four charges for his conduct following the 2020 presidential election through the January 6 Capitol attack: conspiracy to defraud the United States under Title 18 of the United States Code, obstructing an official proceeding and conspiracy to obstruct an official proceeding under the Sarbanes–Oxley Act of 2002, and conspiracy against rights under the Enforcement Act of 1870. The indictment mentioned six unnamed co-conspirators. It is Trump's third indictment and the first indictment against a U.S. president concerning actions while in office. Trump appeared at an arraignment on August 3, 2023, where he pleaded not guilty. The charge with the longest sentence carries a maximum of 20 years in prison.

On February 2, 2024, Judge Tanya Chutkan said she would not schedule a trial until the DC Circuit Court of Appeals decided whether Trump was immune from prosecution. After that court unanimously ruled that Trump was not immune, Trump appealed to the U.S. Supreme Court, which ruled on July 1 that former presidents have "some immunity from criminal prosecution" for their "official acts" made during their presidency. As a result, on August 27, the special counsel issued a superseding indictment that maintained the same four charges but omitted some specific allegations.

Following the election of Trump on November 6, 2024, Smith filed a motion to dismiss the case without prejudice, citing the DOJ's policy of not prosecuting sitting Presidents. On November 25, 2024, Judge Chutkan approved the request and dismissed the charges. In January 2025, the special counsel report was released, in which "the Office assessed that the admissible evidence was sufficient to obtain and sustain a conviction at trial."

== Background ==
=== Accusations of electoral fraud and attempts to overturn the election ===
Throughout his 2016 presidential campaign, Trump repeatedly sowed doubt on the election certification process. Campaigning in Colorado, Trump claimed without evidence that the Democratic Party "[rigged] the election at polling booths". In October 2016, Trump claimed through a series of tweets that widespread voter fraud would occur in the 2016 presidential election. These statements were echoed by Rudy Giuliani, Trump's legal advisor. Trump continued expressing these sentiments into the 2020 presidential election; for months, he prepared arguments in the event of his loss, primarily relating to mail-in ballots. As early as August 2020, he enlisted conservative activist and lawyer Cleta Mitchell to help overturn the election. The Department of Homeland Security warned that Russia was amplifying claims of fraud occurring in mail-in voting to intentionally sow distrust in the voting process as a whole. Two days before Election Day, Trump told reporters that he would be "going in with [his] lawyers" as soon as the election was over.

Bolstered by pro-Trump pundits and perceived strong turnouts at rallies, the Trump campaign was confident that they were going to win the election. On Election Day, preliminary surveys at polling places showed Trump in the lead as his supporters were more likely to turn out in person amid the COVID-19 pandemic, but his lead diminished as mail-in ballots were counted. Following Trump's final campaign event in Grand Rapids, Michigan, Trump's son Eric wagered that he would win at least 322 electoral votes. At the behest of Giuliani, Trump declared in a 2 a.m. election night speech in the East Room that he had won the election and that the counts being reported were fraudulent. As ballots were being counted, campaign data expert Matt Oczkowski bluntly informed Trump that he was going to lose the election. White House Counsel Pat Cipollone told him that invalidating the results of the election would be a "murder-suicide pact". Under then-attorney general William Barr, the Department of Justice failed to find widespread voter fraud in the election. Former speaker of the House Newt Gingrich predicted that Trump voters would erupt in "rage", a sentiment shared by House Republican leader Kevin McCarthy, who told Laura Ingraham on The Ingraham Angle that Republicans should not "be silent about this".

Trump and several co-conspirators repeatedly sought to overturn the results of the election. The Department of Justice investigation into these attempts focused on the implementation of the Trump fake electors plot, in which Trump and his allies would draft allegedly fraudulent certificates of ascertainment affirming Trump as the winner. The effort to write these documents and persuade Republican officials to sign them was performed by Trump's lawyers, including Giuliani and John Eastman, who claimed that irregularities in the election had occurred and proposed that an "alternate" slate of electors should be established while they gathered evidence. Although dozens of these electors were installed and affirmed Trump as the winner, the seven state legislatures targeted in the plot – Arizona, Georgia, Michigan, Nevada, New Mexico, Pennsylvania, and Wisconsin – certified Biden's victory, although Pennsylvania and New Mexico agreed to consider Trump the winner if he succeeded in the many lawsuits challenging the election. The scheme involved sending the fake electoral slates to vice president Mike Pence, pressuring him to count the fake votes. Alternatively, Trump allies posited that Pence could consider the election "defective" under the Electoral Count Act and allow the House of Representatives to decide the outcome.

During the two months following the election, Trump made multiple phone calls to Republican officials in states that had narrowly been won by Biden, asking them to reverse the results and give the victory to him. One such call was to Georgia secretary of state Brad Raffensperger, asking him to "find 11,780 votes". Raffensperger recorded the call and subsequently released it to the public. Both Trump and Giuliani called Rusty Bowers, the speaker of the Arizona House of Representatives, asking him to look into claims of fraud, but he declined to do so without evidence. John Eastman also called Bowers on January 4 asking him to undo the state's certification of Biden's win, but he refused. Trump and his attorneys, as well as Republican members of Congress, also called or met with state officials in Michigan and Pennsylvania, urging them to report that Trump had actually won their states.

On December 19, 2020, six weeks following his election loss, Trump urged his followers on Twitter to protest in Washington, D.C., on January 6, the day Congress was set to certify the results of the election, writing, "Be there, will be wild!" Over the course of the following weeks, Trump would repeat the January 6 date. The Proud Boys worked out where in DC to meet, and how to get to the United States Capitol. The Red-State Secession Facebook page encouraged its followers to post the addresses of its "enemies" including federal judges. Trump continued to repeat false claims about the election in multiple states leading up to January 6, including Georgia, Pennsylvania, Michigan, Nevada, and Arizona. On the morning of January 6, Trump gave a speech in the Ellipse, a park near the White House, and encouraged his followers to walk down to Pennsylvania Avenue to incite within Republicans lawmakers the "kind of pride and boldness that they need to take back our country". Provoked by Trump, the mob of Trump supporters stormed the Capitol.

=== Investigations ===
The January 6 Capitol attack resulted in hundreds of criminal proceedings. The House of Representatives voted to impeach Trump for a second time on January 13. He was acquitted by the Senate on February 13. The House of Representatives voted to create a select committee to investigate the attack in June 2021. Ahead of its final report, the committee voted to recommend charging Trump of four charges and referred him to the Department of Justice. Two of the four charges recommended by the Select Committee were ultimately brought against him in the indictment, with the charges of "inciting or assisting those in an insurrection" (18 U.S.C. § 2383) notably not in the indictment nor "Conspiracy to Make a False Statement" (18 U.S.C. §§ 371, 1001).

In a CNN interview in January 2022, deputy attorney general Lisa Monaco stated that the Department of Justice would investigate the Trump fake electors plot. By March 2022, the Department of Justice had opened an investigation into the events of January 6 and Trump's attempts to overturn the election. The Department of Justice began obtaining White House phone records in April in connection with the January 6 investigation, and a federal grand jury issued subpoenas to Trump's lawyers in connection with the fake electors plot in May. The Washington Post reported in July that the Department of Justice was investigating Trump's actions on January 6. The January 6 investigation was overseen by Thomas Windom, an obscure federal prosecutor.

The FBI investigation was internally codenamed "Arctic Frost" and assigned to the CR15 public corruption unit at the Washington Field Office.

On November 18, 2022, attorney general Merrick Garland appointed Jack Smith to serve as special counsel for the January 6 investigation and the FBI investigation into Donald Trump's handling of government documents. Smith intensified both investigations ahead of increased efforts by Trump to focus on his 2024 presidential campaign. In June 2023, Trump was indicted in connection with the classified documents investigation. Leading up to Trump's indictment in the January 6 investigation, prosecutors continued investigating several strands, including through hundreds of documents provided by former New York Police Department commissioner Bernard Kerik. On July 18, Trump was given a target letter. The following week, his lawyers met with prosecutors, signaling the investigation was nearly complete.

== Original indictment and arraignment ==
The original indictment

Special Counsel Jack Smith delivers remarks announcing the indictment.

The original indictment was unsealed on August 1, 2023. A grand jury in the U.S. District Court for the District of Columbia indicted Trump on four charges: conspiracy to defraud the United States, obstructing an official proceeding, conspiring to do so, and conspiracy against rights. D.C. district judge Tanya S. Chutkan was randomly assigned to hear the case.

According to the indictment, on December 8, 2020, a senior campaign advisor admitted that "our research and campaign legal team can't back up any of the claims ... It's tough to own any of this when it's all just conspiracy shit beamed down from the mothership." On January 1, Trump learned that Mike Pence did not believe the vice president could reject electoral votes. Trump called Pence and told him, "You're too honest." On January 3, it is alleged that White House deputy counsel Patrick F. Philbin privately said that if Trump held onto power, there would be "riots in every major city in the United States", to which "Co-conspirator No. 4" (likely Jeffrey Clark) replied "That's why there's an Insurrection Act", implying that Trump could command the military to keep himself in power. The indictment also described a previously unreported discussion between Trump and White House Counsel Pat Cipollone, in which Cipollone advised Trump, hours after the Capitol riot started, to drop his objections to the election. Trump refused.

Trump appeared before magistrate judge Moxila A. Upadhyaya at the E. Barrett Prettyman United States Courthouse in Washington, D.C., on August 3. Smith was present at the arraignment, as were Trump lawyer Evan Corcoran and chief judge James Boasberg. In the courtroom, Trump was joined by lawyers Todd Blanche and John Lauro; prosecutors Thomas Windom and Molly Gaston were joined by a special agent from the Federal Bureau of Investigation. Trump pleaded not guilty to each count, and prosecutors confirmed they would not seek pre-trial detention.

== Superseding indictment and arraignment ==
On August 27, 2024, the special counsel issued a superseding indictment that maintained the same four charges but omitted some specific allegations.

Attorney General Merrick Garland has maintained that issuing the superseding indictment did not violate any election-related Justice Department rules. The Justice Department has a policy not to overtly investigate any candidate within 60 days before an election; the superseding indictment was issued 70 days before the November 5 election. Further, Garland said, the Justice Department issued the new indictment "to respond to the direct instructions of the Supreme Court". Though Trump's team argued that the superseding indictment should be invalid due to its timing so close to an election, Judge Chutkan said she would not consider this argument.

On September 3, Trump submitted a court filing in which he once again pleaded not guilty. He waived his right to appear at his second arraignment and did not attend. He was represented at the hearing by Lauro, Blanche, and Emil Bove. As of his second arraignment on September 5, 2024, he has not yet appeared in person before Judge Chutkan.

At the September 5 hearing, Trump's lawyers argued that they were dealing with a new indictment. Judge Chutkan disagreed, observing that the four charges remained the same and that the related allegations had been reduced: "It's not more stuff, it's less."

== Allegations in the indictments ==
The original indictment contained 130 numbered paragraphs, while the superseding indictment contained 106. Both were based on the same central allegation: after losing the 2020 presidential election, Trump was determined to remain in power and, although litigation, recounts, and audits did not substantiate his claims, he and his co-conspirators continued to use claims of widespread election fraud that they knew were false. According to prosecutors, their actions were intended to impair the federal process for collecting, counting, and certifying electoral votes.

=== Alleged conduct ===
According to the indictments, Trump and his private attorneys pressured election officials and state legislators in Arizona, Georgia, Michigan, Pennsylvania, and Wisconsin to reject certified results or replace Biden electors with Trump electors. Prosecutors alleged that these efforts continued despite Trump being told by campaign advisers, state and federal officials, and courts that his fraud claims were unsupported. On January 2, 2021, during the call with Georgia secretary of state Brad Raffensperger, Trump demanded that Raffensperger "find" the 11,780 votes he needed to reverse the result in the state.

A second part of the alleged plan was the creation of false slates of electors in Arizona, Georgia, Michigan, Nevada, New Mexico, Pennsylvania, and Wisconsin. According to prosecutors, Kenneth Chesebro, Rudy Giuliani, and other co-conspirators prepared documents and coordinated meetings at which participants signed certificates representing Trump as the winner, although state authorities had certified Biden's electors. The certificates were sent to, among others, the president of the Senate and the Archivist of the United States. Some participants were told that the documents would be used only if a court ruled in Trump's favor; the indictments alleged, however, that the organizers intended to present the slates during the congressional certification regardless of the outcome of the litigation, thereby creating a dispute over which electoral votes should be counted.

The original indictment additionally alleged that Trump attempted to use the Justice Department to give federal authority to his election-fraud claims. Prosecutors alleged that he pressured acting attorney general Jeffrey A. Rosen and acting deputy attorney general Richard Donoghue to announce that the election was corrupt and considered replacing Rosen with Jeffrey Clark. Clark had prepared a proposed letter stating that the department had identified significant election irregularities and urging selected state legislatures to reconsider their results. Trump allegedly abandoned the proposed leadership change only after being warned that it would lead to mass resignations in the department and the White House. The entire episode, together with references to the Justice Department official described as co-conspirator No. 4, whom news organizations identified as Clark, was removed from the superseding indictment following the Supreme Court's ruling on presidential immunity for official acts.

Another part of the prosecution's case concerned efforts to persuade Vice President Mike Pence to reject electoral votes cast for Biden or return them to state legislatures. Pence repeatedly maintained that the Constitution gave him no such authority. The original indictment alleged that, on January 1, Trump told him, "You're too honest." John Eastman advanced a theory under which Pence could unilaterally disregard some electoral votes or delay their counting, although, according to the indictment, Eastman acknowledged that the Supreme Court would probably reject the theory unanimously. In the days before January 6, Trump publicly presented Pence as capable of changing the result, and his campaign issued a statement, which prosecutors said Trump knew was false, claiming that the president and vice president were in complete agreement.

According to prosecutors, the alleged scheme culminated on January 6, 2021. During a privately funded and organized campaign rally at The Ellipse, Trump repeated his election-fraud claims, said that Pence could change the result, and urged his supporters to march to the Capitol. After the crowd entered the building and interrupted the certification proceeding, Trump personally posted a message criticizing Pence for lacking the "courage" to act. The indictments further alleged that Trump and Giuliani attempted to use the interruption to delay certification: Giuliani telephoned members of Congress, while Eastman asked Pence's counsel shortly before midnight to obtain a ten-day postponement. Congress resumed the proceeding after an interruption of approximately six hours, and Pence announced Biden's victory early on January 7.

=== Superseding indictment ===
The superseding indictment, filed on August 27, 2024, retained all four charges and the central description of the alleged scheme. It was presented to a new grand jury that had not previously heard evidence in the case. The document was shortened principally by removing or revising allegations that could concern official presidential conduct following the Supreme Court's decision in Trump v. United States. It no longer included the effort to involve the Justice Department or Clark's alleged actions, and it omitted some communications with federal officials and White House advisers.

For the allegations that remained, the superseding indictment more explicitly portrayed Trump as a candidate acting through his campaign, private attorneys, and a private political consultant. It repeatedly stated that he had no official responsibility for state certification of election results, the convening of electors or transmission of their certificates, or Congress's counting and certification of electoral votes. It characterized Pence's function during the joint session as his ceremonial role as president of the Senate and described Trump's January 6 address as a campaign speech at a privately organized political rally. The revised indictment retained the allegations concerning pressure on state officials, the false-elector plan, efforts to pressure Pence, and attempts by Trump and his co-conspirators to prolong the interruption of the certification proceeding.

=== Charges ===
Both indictments charged Trump with the same four federal offenses:

- Conspiracy to defraud the United States under 18 U.S.C. § 371, based on an alleged agreement to use dishonesty, fraud, and deceit to impair the federal process for collecting, counting, and certifying presidential election results;
- conspiracy to obstruct an official proceeding under 18 U.S.C. § 1512(k), based on an alleged agreement to corruptly obstruct Congress's certification of the electoral vote;
- obstruction of and attempt to obstruct an official proceeding under 18 U.S.C. §§ 1512(c)(2) and 2, concerning the certification proceeding; and
- conspiracy against rights under 18 U.S.C. § 241, based on an alleged agreement to interfere with the right to vote and to have one's vote counted.

== Co-conspirators ==
The original indictment referenced six co-conspirators. Although they were not named in the indictment, news agencies reported their likely identities based on public information. The indictment did not charge them.

- Co-conspirator No. 1: Trump lawyer Rudy Giuliani, as confirmed by his lawyer, Robert Costello, who claimed the indictment "eviscerates the First Amendment".
- Co-conspirator No. 2: Trump lawyer John Eastman, as confirmed by his lawyer, Harvey Silverglate, who claimed Eastman would be exonerated.
- Co-conspirator No. 3: Trump lawyer Sidney Powell. CNN noted that the dates of a "lawsuit against the Governor of Georgia" mentioned in the indictment align with a lawsuit filed by Powell. On October 19, Powell pleaded guilty in the Georgia election racketeering prosecution (in which Trump is named as a co-defendant) in an agreement with prosecutors to testify against other defendants in future trials.
- Co-conspirator No. 4: Trump lawyer Jeffrey Clark. CNN matched quotes of an email in the indictment with quotes from a Senate report. Clark was omitted from the superseding indictment in August 2024.
- Co-conspirator No. 5: Trump lawyer Kenneth Chesebro. CNN referred to information released by the House Select Committee on the January 6 Attack. On October 20, Chesebro pleaded guilty in the Georgia election racketeering prosecution in exchange for testimony at future trials.
- Co-conspirator No. 6: A "political consultant" who allegedly named attorneys in Arizona, Georgia, Michigan, Nevada, New Mexico, Pennsylvania, and Wisconsin "who could assist in the fraudulent elector effort". On December 13, 2020, this person joined a phone call with Rudy Giuliani and a senior campaign advisor for Trump.

Later, the superseding indictment clarified that Co-conspirator Nos. 1, 2, 3, and 5 were "private attorney[s]" and that Co-conspirator No. 6 was a "private political consultant". It omitted Co-conspirator No. 4 entirely.

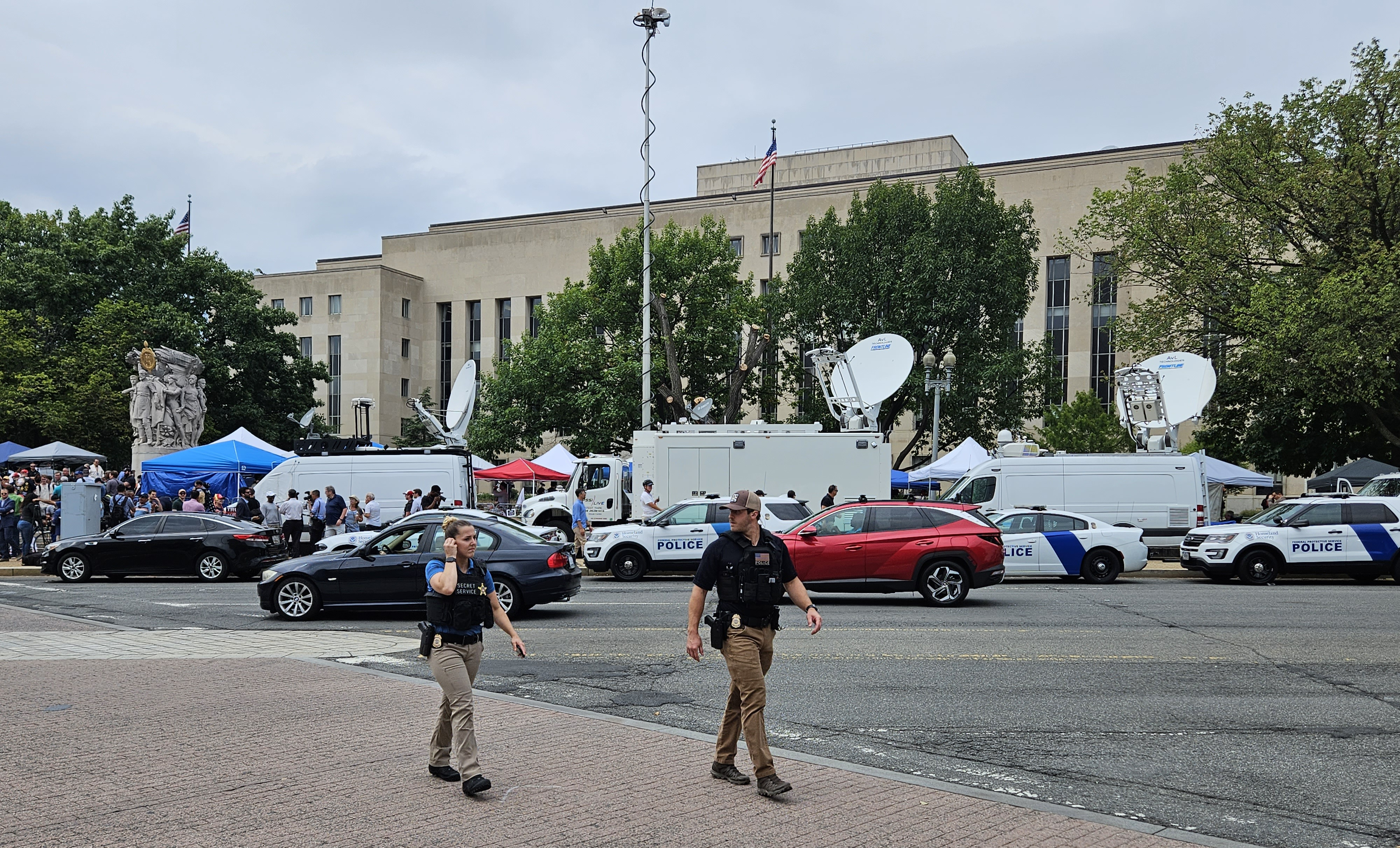
Two United States Secret Service agents patrol in front of the courthouse before the arraignment.

== Timetable ==
=== Initial timetable ===
In August 2023, Chutkan set trial for March 4, 2024. This was close to federal prosecutors' proposal of January 2, 2024, whereas Trump's team had suggested April 2026.

Originally, all pre-trial motions were due by October 9. On September 28, Trump's attorneys requested a 60-day extension. On October 6, Chutkan extended the filing deadline for motions to dismiss and other dispositive motions (except motions in limine and motions to suppress) until October 23.

On October 10, acknowledging that the screening of potential jurors would involve revealing jurors' identities to the legal teams, prosecutors recommended prohibiting attorneys from "friending" or "following" the social media accounts of potential jurors. On November 2, Chutkan ruled that jury selection would begin on February 9 (aligned with the prosecution's request of early February) and ordered that the parties not share any jury pool research with any other legal entity (such as Trump's presidential campaign) or publicly disclose the identities of prospective jurors.

However, Chutkan paused deadlines in the case after Trump asked the DC Circuit Court of Appeals on December 7 to decide whether he is immune from prosecution. On February 2, 2024, one week before jury selection would have begun, Chutkan issued an order acknowledging that the trial would have to be postponed. (Over the previous week, she had already scheduled other trials for March and April.) She said she would not set a new date for Trump's trial until the question of presidential immunity was resolved. On February 6, the appeals court ruled that Trump was not immune. Trump then appealed to the Supreme Court, which scheduled oral arguments for April 25 and did not rule until the end of the court's term on July 1.

=== Post-immunity timetable ===
At Trump's second arraignment on September 5, 2024, Judge Chutkan first addressed the immunity issue. She maintained that the Supreme Court had given her discretion to decide whether evidence regarding Mike Pence is admissible and that, even if she decides it is inadmissible, she is not required to toss out the entire indictment.

She next addressed the timetable. The old deadlines for witnesses and evidence had "long since passed", she noted, because the case had been stayed while Trump appealed. She said that "we are hardly sprinting to the finish line" and insisted that "there needs to be some forward motion in this case." She said any remaining discovery should proceed promptly.

Hours after the hearing ended, she set new deadlines for court filings, including:

- Prosecutors must file their initial brief on the immunity question by September 26 (which they did). They had asked for this extra time. Trump must file his reply by October 17 (later extended to November 7).
- Prosecutors' response to the immunity question by October 29 (later extended to November 21). The deadline for Trump's reply was later extended to December 5.
- November 7: Trump's final brief on the legality of the special counsel's appointment.

No hearings were yet included in the schedule. Chutkan did not set a trial date, acknowledging that the case would return to the Supreme Court before going to trial. She said: "We all know that whatever my decision on immunity is going to be appealed."

Immediately following Trump's election in November 2024, it was reported that the Justice Department was considering how to wind down the case. On November 25, Smith filed a motion to drop all charges against Trump, citing the DOJ's policy of not prosecuting sitting presidents, and Chutkan approved the request the same day.

== Pretrial proceedings ==
Cameras are not allowed in the courtroom.

=== Protective orders and security measures ===
On August 4 and 5, the special counsel filed motions asking the court to restrict Trump from making public statements about the case and to impose a protective order on Trump and his attorneys to prevent them from revealing evidence (as they noted Trump has done in other cases). In particular, they cited social media posts on August 4 and 5 in which Trump threatened to retaliate against anyone who "comes after" him and called Pence "delusional". The Trump campaign characterized this as political speech that should be allowable. When Chutkan would not grant the Trump team's request for an extra three days to respond, Trump attacked her on social media, demanding that she be removed from the case and that the case be moved out of the District of Columbia. On August 7, Trump's attorneys requested a less restrictive order that would "shield only genuinely sensitive materials from public view", to which prosecutors replied that Trump sought "to try this case in the media rather than in the courtroom". Chutkan scheduled a hearing for August 11.

On August 8, Trump insisted he would continue to speak publicly about the case. On August 10, Chutkan was spotted with the protection of U.S. Marshals, revealing an apparently increased level of security. A Texas woman was charged the next week with leaving Chutkan a voicemail with racial and gender slurs in which she threatened: "Hey you stupid slave nigger ... If Trump doesn't get elected in 2024, we are coming to kill you, so tread lightly, bitch ... You will be targeted personally, publicly, your family, all of it." (Note: The Texas woman's criminal trial began on October 30.) At the August 11 hearing, Chutkan issued a less broad protective order than what was sought by prosecutors, who wanted to lock down all evidence turned over in discovery. The protective order allowed Trump to access certain non-sensitive information. She admonished Trump's attorneys that inflammatory public remarks by the former president would cause her to take measures to expedite the trial and prevent potential witness tampering and jury pool tainting. She emphasized that Trump's status as a criminal defendant had priority over his free speech as a political candidate.

Chutkan ruled Trump could review materials alone, but only if his attorneys ensured he did not have any device that could copy them. A prosecutor told the court that once the protective order was in place, the special counsel expected to provide the defense about 11.6 million pages or files of materials by the end of August. Court documents released on September 15 showed the special counsel previously asked Judge Chutkan in sealed briefs to impose a "narrowly tailored" gag order on Trump, asserting that since his indictment he "has spread disparaging and inflammatory public posts on Truth Social on a near-daily basis regarding the citizens of the District of Columbia, the court, prosecutors and prospective witnesses." Smith filed another brief on September 29 regarding more recent derogatory remarks Trump had made about Brad Raffensperger, William Barr, and former chairman of the Joint Chiefs of Staff Mark Milley, all of whom were identified as witnesses in the Trump indictment. Trump had on September 22 suggested that Milley should be executed for treason. The brief asserted, "No other criminal defendant would be permitted to issue public statements insinuating that a known witness in his case should be executed. This defendant should not be, either."

On October 16, following a hearing, Chutkan granted a limited gag order. The gag order prohibits all parties from making public statements targeting Jack Smith or his staff, the defense counsel or their staff, the judge or court personnel, and any potential witnesses or the substance of witness testimony with smears, intimidation, or harassment. The gag order does not prohibit Trump from making statements criticizing the Biden administration, the Justice Department, the District of Columbia, other presidential candidates and their political platforms, and the conduct of the trial as being unfair or politically motivated. Trump's attorneys filed an appeal of the gag order the next day that claimed that the order violated the Freedom of Speech Clause of the 1st Amendment, and Chutkan issued a stay of the order on October 20. On October 25, the prosecution filed a reply to the stay order that urged that the gag order be reinstated. On the same day, the American Civil Liberties Union filed an amicus brief against the gag order that argued that it violated the 1st Amendment.

Chutkan granted the prosecution's request on October 29, stating in her ruling that "First Amendment rights of participants in criminal proceedings ... yield, when necessary, to the orderly administration of justice – a principle reflected in Supreme Court precedent", and citing Gentile v. State Bar of Nevada (1991), that "contrary to Defendant's argument, the right to a fair trial is not his alone, but belongs also to the government and the public."

On November 2, Trump's attorneys appealed Chutkan's reinstatement of the gag order, asking the U.S. District of Columbia Circuit Court of Appeals to stay the gag order during the appeal. The next day, the court granted the pause and scheduled a hearing. On November 14, the prosecution's filing urged that the gag order be upheld. At the November 20 hearing, a three-judge panel (with Brad Garcia, Patricia Millett, and Cornelia Pillard presiding) suggested that it might limit the scope of the gag order. It noted Supreme Court precedent suggesting that, in balancing the rights to freedom of speech and a fair trial, protecting the integrity of criminal procedure outweighs free speech rights. On November 23, the prosecution's filing urged reinstatement of the gag order, citing a document that compiled hundreds of voicemails containing threats and harassment of presiding New York State Unified Court System Judge Arthur Engoron in the New York civil investigation of The Trump Organization; the next day, the defense replied, claiming that the evidence the prosecution cited was irrelevant.

On December 8, the three-judge panel on the appeals court mostly upheld the gag order. The court ruled that Trump cannot speak about prosecutors, court staff or their families. However, Trump may speak about witnesses as long as he doesn't speak specifically about their participation in the court case. He's also free to speak about special counsel Jack Smith, President Joe Biden, and the Justice Department, and he's allowed to say that the charges are "politically motivated". On December 18, Trump asked the court to reconsider its decision; on January 23, the full 11-member court said it would not. (Trump may still appeal to the U.S. Supreme Court, as previously indicated.)

On January 7, 2024, Chutkan's home was swatted (i.e., someone called in a false report of a violent crime to prompt a police response).

=== Other pre-trial motions ===
On September 11, 2023, Trump asked Chutkan to recuse herself accusing her of "prejudging the facts pertinent to the case and his culpability". On September 17, he repeated the request. Chutkan denied the request ten days later.

Also on October 5, a consortium of media organizations filed a request with Chutkan to allow live broadcasting of the trial's proceedings.

In an October 10 court filing, prosecutors said that Trump and his legal team had "repeatedly and publicly announced" that they would employ an "advice of counsel" defense, i.e., shifting blame to certain lawyers for advising Trump wrongly. Prosecutors asked Chutkan to order Trump to disclose by December 18 whether he intended to use this defense. This defense would require Trump to reveal communications and evidence related to his current and former attorneys, and he would thereby forfeit his assertions of attorney-client privilege. Prosecutors noted in the motion that at least 25 witnesses had asserted attorney-client privilege during the course of their investigation.

On October 11, Trump's attorneys filed a motion for discovery based on claims made by U.S. representative Barry Loudermilk that the House January 6 Committee did not turn over all of its evidence while the committee was under investigation by the House Administration Oversight Subcommittee. The motion requested subpoenas be issued to Bennie Thompson (who chaired the January 6 House committee), Loudermilk, the House Administration Oversight Subcommittee, the Clerk of the House of Representatives, the Archivist of the United States, and White House and Department of Homeland Security attorneys.

On October 23, Trump's attorneys filed three motions to dismiss the indictment on the grounds that it violates the Freedom of Speech Clause, violates the Double Jeopardy Clause and the Due Process Clause of the 5th Amendment (with the former being cited due to Trump's acquittal in his second impeachment trial), that the indictment fails to state an offense, and that the indictment is a selective prosecution, as well as a motion to strike the allegations related to the January 6 Capitol attack as prejudicial and inflammatory. On November 3, the prosecution filed a reply to the October 5 media consortium request urging that Chutkan reject it in accordance with Rule 53 of the Federal Rules of Criminal Procedure. On November 6, the prosecution filed a reply to the October 23 motions to dismiss arguing that they were without merit. On November 10, Trump's attorneys filed a reply in support of the October 5 media consortium request, to which the prosecution replied in opposition on November 13. On November 17, Chutkan ruled that the defense had failed to demonstrate that the language in the indictment was prejudicial or inflammatory in rejection of the October 23 motion to strike. On November 27, Chutkan rejected the October 11 motion for discovery filed by Trump's attorneys.

On November 28, Trump's attorneys submitted a motion to compel discovery in two separate filings with 59 separate requests for evidence from the prosecution related to vote fraud in the election, actual or attempted foreign interference with election infrastructure during the election, political bias in U.S. Intelligence Community assessments of foreign interference, the existence of any potential undercover government operatives or informants at the January 6 Capitol attack, and communications or coordination between the Justice Department with the Biden administration or Biden family (including Hunter Biden).

On December 27, the special counsel asked the court to prohibit Trump from presenting "irrelevant disinformation", such as Trump's accusations that the mayor of Washington, D.C., the National Guard, and the Capitol Police failed to prevent the attack. Smith argued: "A bank robber cannot defend himself by blaming the bank's security guard for failing to stop him."

On October 16, 2024, the special counsel argued in a court filing that the case should not be dismissed. Trump had argued that it should be dismissed. The Supreme Court had ruled earlier that year that charges in January 6 cases for obstruction can be brought for presenting fake documents in the Electoral College certification proceeding (as Trump had indeed been charged), though not for rioting.

=== Immunity dispute ===
==== Appeals ====
On October 5, 2023, Trump's attorneys filed a motion to dismiss the indictment, cited presidential immunity under Nixon v. Fitzgerald.

On December 1, 2023, Chutkan rejected the October 5 motion to dismiss under presidential immunity and the October 23 motion to dismiss under the Freedom of Speech Clause, the Double Jeopardy Clause, and the Due Process Clause.

On December 7, 2023, Trump filed notice that he planned to appeal Chutkan's ruling.

On December 13, 2023, Chutkan paused all deadlines in the case, including the upcoming trial itself, so the immunity dispute could be resolved first. The gag order remained in effect. After Chutkan stayed the case, prosecutors provided public notice that they would file discovery material, although they no longer had an immediate deadline to do so.

On January 4, 2024, Trump's team asked Chutkan to reject these filings and hold prosecutors in contempt. Prosecutors replied the next day saying that Trump hadn't been burdened by "the mere receipt" of documents ahead of deadline, especially as he had no deadline to reply to it.

On January 9, 2024, the U.S. Court of Appeals for the District of Columbia Circuit heard arguments in the immunity dispute. Trump attended the hearing in person. In response to a hypothetical question posed by Judge Pan about whether a U.S. president could order SEAL Team Six to assassinate a political rival, Sauer argued that unless the president were subsequently impeached and convicted for said unlawful order, the president could not be criminally prosecuted.

On February 6, 2024, the Circuit Court of Appeals panel unanimously affirmed the District Court ruling, concluding that Trump's alleged actions "lacked any lawful discretionary authority ... and he is answerable in court for his conduct" because "former President Trump has become citizen Trump ... [and] any executive immunity that may have protected him while he served as President no longer protects him against this prosecution." The panel held further that former Presidents have no immunity for "allegedly violat[ing] generally applicable criminal laws" while in office, and specifically "to commit crimes that would neutralize the most fundamental check on executive power – the recognition and implementation of election results".

On February 12, 2024, Trump's attorneys filed a motion requesting that the Supreme Court block the appeals court ruling.

On February 28, 2024, the Supreme Court granted a writ of certiorari for Trump's appeal. The Supreme Court heard oral arguments on April 25.

On July 1, 2024, the Supreme Court ruled that, regarding a president's behavior during their presidency, former presidents have "some immunity from criminal prosecution" for their "official acts" but have "no immunity" for their "unofficial acts".

==== Proceedings resulting from the immunity decision ====
The Supreme Court decision directed Chutkan to apply the former's ruling to determine what parts of the indictment may proceed, specifically to determine whether each act was official or private conduct; whether or not the official acts are part of core constitutional duties; and whether prosecuting the non-core official acts would have any "dangers of intrusion on the authority and functions of the Executive." Under Supreme Court rules, the prosecutors were given one month to ask the justices to reconsider their ruling, with the case returning to Chutkan on August 2, 2024. Smith could have petitioned to shorten this period, but chose not to.

After the case was returned to Chutkan following resolution of his immunity argument, she asked all parties to propose schedules for further pretrial proceedings by August 9, 2024, and she set an August 16 hearing to determine how to proceed with the case. She also denied an October motion by Trump to dismiss the case on statutory grounds. The special counsel requested a deadline extension to August 30; Trump did not object. (Both parties went on to meet this deadline.) The hearing for which the report was needed was postponed to September 5.

The special counsel filed a superseding indictment on August 27, 2024. It omitted mention of some of Trump's alleged activities, including his attempts to involve the Justice Department in his claims of election fraud, (Note: As such, references to Jeffrey Clark as co-conspirator no. 4 were removed from the indictment.) as such "official acts" can no longer be used as evidence following the Supreme Court's decision on immunity. Nonetheless, the four original charges were not dropped. The superseding indictment had been presented to a new grand jury that had not previously heard evidence in the case.

On September 5, Judge Chutkan held the first hearing in the case since the immunity decision. The purpose of the hearing was to decide whether the trial can proceed, to begin to set a trial schedule, and to decide whether prosecutors can call Pence and others as witnesses. She set a September 26 deadline for the prosecution to file its initial brief that would include previously unseen evidence such as grand jury transcripts; Trump attorneys had sought to delay the filing until after the November election. Although filings typically cannot be longer than 45 pages, Chutkan gave Smith permission to file up to 180 pages. He filed a 165-page brief under seal. Trump asked for more redactions. On October 2, Chutkan publicly released the brief. She also planned to release the prosecution's redacted exhibits related to the brief, but on October 10, she gave Trump one week to appeal the release. He did not appeal, and the redacted exhibits were released.

The first section of Smith's brief summarized evidence and describes the prosecutors' argument; the second discussed what constitutes an "official" act; the third applied the principles to Trump's case; the fourth urged Chutkan to rule that Trump does not have immunity for these actions and that he be brought to trial.

Names of 71 people were redacted, identified only as P1 through P71. Using other identifying information, The New York Times identified P1 as Steve Bannon; P4 as Jason Miller; P9 as Eric Herschmann; P21 as Mark Meadows; P45 as Dan Scavino; and P52 as Bill Barr.

Also at the hearing on September 5, Judge Chutkan allowed Trump to file a motion asserting that the appointment of Smith as a special prosecutor had been invalid because he had not been nominated and confirmed by the U.S. Senate. A similar motion had succeeded in the classified documents case that Smith brought against Trump, resulting in dismissal of that case by Judge Aileen Cannon, but Judge Chutkan mentioned she did not find Cannon's ruling “particularly persuasive".

== Dismissal and report proceedings ==
Following Trump's election in November 2024, Smith filed a motion to dismiss the case without prejudice, citing the DOJ's policy of not prosecuting sitting Presidents. Politico described that request for dismissal as "in some sense a formality" because Trump's Attorney General would have dropped the matter later on.

Smith resigned on January 10, 2025 upon completion of his work. His final report on the election obstruction case was released on January 14. The collected evidence was presented with the conclusion that the DOJ could have successfully pursued a conviction:

As explained below, the Office commenced prosecution of Mr. Trump in the Election Case under both the original and superseding indictments because it concluded that the admissible evidence would be sufficient to obtain and sustain a conviction. ... the Office concluded that Mr. Trump's conduct violated several federal criminal statutes ... Indeed, but for Mr. Trump's election and imminent return to the Presidency, the Office assessed that the admissible evidence was sufficient to obtain and sustain a conviction at trial.

The release of this report (Volume I) was affected by parallel proceedings in the classified documents federal prosecution, for which Smith had also written a report (Volume II). The judge in that case, Aileen Cannon, stayed the release of both volumes while the 11th Circuit Court of Appeals considered Trump's motion to block the release. The 11th Circuit Court denied Trump's motion on January 9, Cannon gave the government until January 12 to say whether anything in the election obstruction volume of the report related to the defendants in the classified documents prosecution.

On February 19, Trump said that "if I would have lost [the 2024 election], my life would have been a much different life, it would have been a very nasty life", because "they were going after me".

== Potential witnesses and evidence ==
=== Prosecution ===
On October 24, 2023, ABC News and The Guardian reported that anonymous sources have stated that Trump administration White House Chief of Staff Mark Meadows has received legal immunity from Jack Smith in exchange for testimony under oath and has testified before the grand jury. The next day, CBS News reported that anonymous sources have stated that Meadows is cooperating with prosecutors and has testified before the grand jury but did not state that Meadows has received legal immunity, while Meadows' attorney stated to CBS News that the ABC News report was "largely inaccurate." In their October 25 reply to the gag order stay ruling, the prosecution did not address the veracity of the ABC News report and referred to Trump's October 24 Truth Social post about the news report as "an unmistakable and threatening message to a foreseeable witness in this case."

On December 5, the government alleged in a court filing that Trump had "sent" his supporters to the Capitol. The government said it would submit evidence to demonstrate Trump's "post-conspiracy embrace of particularly violent and notorious rioters", indicating his "motive and intent."

In a December 5 court filing, Smith prosecutors asserted they had evidence in election day text messages between a Trump campaign employee, who is an unindicted co-conspirator in the case, and a campaign attorney in Detroit. Prosecutors asserted that Trump and his co-conspirators knew Biden was taking the lead in Michigan results and sought to subvert them, with the campaign employee encouraging "rioting and other methods of obstruction." Prosecutors alleged that at the time of the text messages, "a large number of untrained individuals flooded the Detroit [ballot counting facility] and began making illegitimate and aggressive challenges to the vote count."

On December 11, the special counsel filed a brief indicating he would present an expert witness at trial who had extracted and examined data from Trump's phone from the weeks while he attempted to subvert the election. The data had been obtained from Twitter under a January 2023 search warrant.

On October 18, 2024, Smith released nearly 2,000 pages of evidence. Most pages were entirely redacted. The first volume contained excerpts of interviews by the House select committee on January 6; the second, social media posts; the third, photos of the signed fake elector certificates and a transcript of the Trump–Raffensperger call; the fourth, John Eastman's memos for a plan for Pence to reject the certification, plus public statements and fundraising emails.

=== Defense ===
During "full Ginsburg" interviews on August 7, 2023, new Trump attorney John Lauro asserted "a technical violation of the Constitution is not a violation of criminal law", so it was "just plain wrong" that Trump had pressured Pence to violate the law. Pence had said four days earlier that Trump and his advisers had pressured him "essentially to overturn the election".

In two court filings in late November 2023, Trump's lawyers presented possible defenses. They blamed foreign governments, arguing that "President Trump and others acted in good faith" based on falsehoods in "covert foreign disinformation campaigns relating to the 2020 election". They asked the court to consider the U.S. attorney's office in Washington, D.C., as well as other agencies, as part of the prosecution team. (Doing so would slow down the case by requiring those agencies to submit information to the court and portray the indictment as politically motivated.) Trump's team further complained that some witnesses for the prosecution may have anti-Trump "political bias".

== Reactions ==
=== Defendant ===
The Trump campaign responded to the indictment with a press release, accusing President Joe Biden of political persecution and claiming that it was election interference. The Trump campaign issued a statement calling the indictment "reminiscent of Nazi Germany".

In an interview that Fox News aired on September 1, 2024, Trump said: "Whoever heard you get indicted for interfering with a presidential election where you have every right to do it." He added that "my poll numbers go up" because of being indicted for the interference. Two weeks before Trump won the 2024 presidential election, he said in a radio interview that, were he to take office, "I would fire him [Jack Smith] within two seconds."

=== Republicans in support of the indictment ===
- Mike Pence, who was Trump's vice president and, at the time, was also running for the Republican nomination in the 2024 presidential election, issued a statement strongly condemning Trump, stating that this indictment was "an important reminder [that] anyone who puts himself over the Constitution should never be president of the United States". In an interview with reporters at the Indiana State Fair the next day, he expanded on his comments, stating that he could not have overturned the election results as vice president.
- Former U.S. attorney general William Barr said the case against Trump was legitimate and that he will testify if he is called.
- Adam Kinzinger, a member of the January 6 Committee and a former Illinois representative, tweeted that "Today is the beginning of justice" and added that Trump is "a cancer on our democracy".
- Former New Jersey governor Chris Christie, who was running for the 2024 presidential Republican nomination at the time, said Trump "swore an oath to the Constitution, violated his oath & brought shame to his presidency."
- Former Arkansas governor Asa Hutchinson, who was running for the 2024 presidential Republican nomination at the time, said "Trump has disqualified himself from ever holding our nation's highest office again."
- On August 14, 2023, nearly a dozen former judges and federal legal officials, all appointed by Republicans, submitted an amicus brief saying they agreed with Jack Smith's proposed trial date of January 2, 2024. The brief states "There is no more important issue facing America and the American people—and to the very functioning of democracy—than whether the former president is guilty of criminally undermining America's elections and American democracy in order to remain in power [...]".

=== Republicans opposed to the indictment ===
- Ron DeSantis, the governor of Florida who was also running for the 2024 presidential Republican nomination, tweeted that he would "end the weaponization of government, replace the FBI director, and ensure a single standard of justice for all Americans" if elected. He also voiced agreement with the defendant's claim that the charges were politically motivated. In addition, DeSantis has previously expressed his intention to pardon Trump if he were to win the presidency.
- Then-Speaker of the House Kevin McCarthy wrote on Twitter that House Republicans would "continue to uncover the truth about Biden Inc. and the two-tiered system of justice."
- With a looming September 30 deadline to fund the government for the coming fiscal year starting October 1, some House Republicans had proposed leveraging their power of the purse to try to stop the federal and state prosecutions of Trump, though a federal shutdown would not affect the prosecutions.

=== Democrats in support of the indictment ===
- Senate Majority Leader Chuck Schumer in a joint statement with House Democratic Leader Hakeem Jeffries said "No one is above the law – including Donald Trump".
- House members Nancy Pelosi, Joaquin Castro and Rashida Tlaib also came out in support of the indictment.
- Following Trump's reelection in 2024, former House Judiciary Committee chair Jerry Nadler complained that "Merrick Garland wasted a year" before appointing the special prosecutor in late 2022. Though Garland might have acted more quickly using the same evidence that the January 6 House select committee was using, he "only started the prosecution after he was in effect forced to by the report of the Jan. 6 committee and the criminal referral". With an earlier start to the indictment, Nadler imagined, "I think he [Trump] would have been convicted and we’d have a different president now."

== See also ==
- Federal prosecution of Donald Trump (classified documents case) – 2023–24 U.S. legal affair
- Fischer v. United States (2024)
- Indictments against Donald Trump – 2023 charges against the then former U.S. president
- Presidential eligibility of Donald Trump – 2023–24 U.S. legal and political dispute
- Prosecution of Donald Trump in Georgia – RICO case against Donald Trump and others
- Prosecution of Donald Trump in New York – US state criminal case against president
- Trump fake electors plot – 2020 U.S. Republican election fraud scheme
- Trump v. Anderson (2024)
