= Crime in Harlem =

Map of greater Harlem

Greater Harlem, in the northern section of the New York City borough of Manhattan, has historically had high poverty and crime rates. Crime in Harlem is primarily related to illicit activities such as theft, robbery, drug trafficking and prostitution. Criminal organizations such as street gangs are responsible for a significant portion of crime, particularly violent crime. The leading cause of death among young black males in Harlem is homicide. According to a survey published in 2013 by Union Settlement Association, residents of East Harlem perceive crime as their biggest single concern. Greater Harlem has one of the highest violent crime rates in New York City despite significant declines from historic highs.

== Background ==
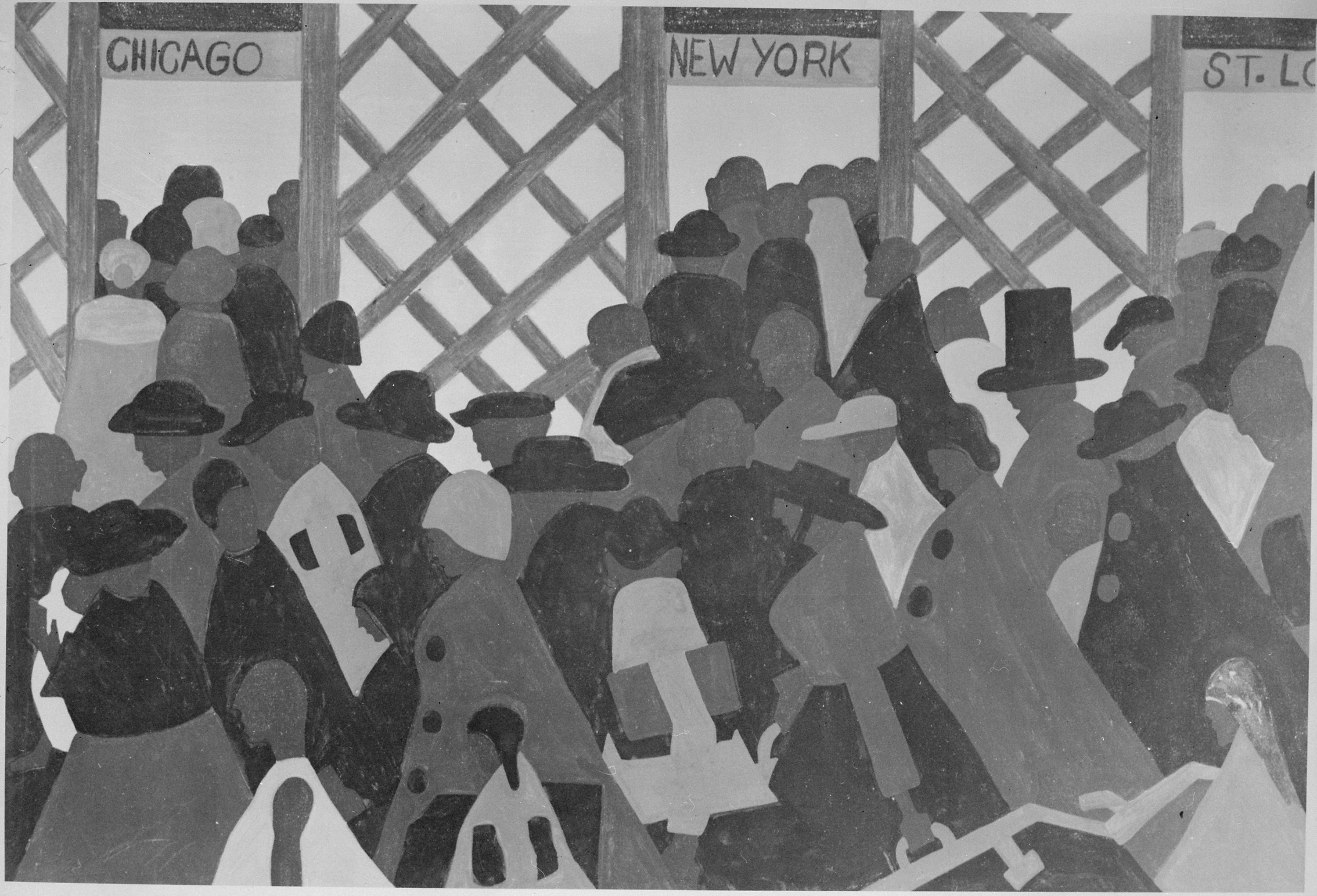
The Great Migration

Greater Harlem was seen as sophisticated in the later part of the nineteenth century. Over the years, however, organized crime by gangsters of Italian, and Irish origin, such as colorful personalities as Lucky Luciano, began to rise in Harlem. This gradually built its notorious reputation.

Since the 1920s, greater Harlem has been known as a major African-American residential, cultural and business center. Black residents began to arrive en masse in 1905, with numbers fed by the Great Migration. In the 1920s and 1930s, Central and West Harlem were the focus of the "Harlem Renaissance", an outpouring of artistic work without precedent in the American black community and it even came to be known as "the capital of black America". However, with job losses in the time of the Great Depression and the deindustrialization of New York City after World War II, rates of crime and poverty increased significantly.

In Italian Harlem an organization titled "the Black hand" had emerged between 1901 and 1921 in Second Avenue which indulged in blackmail. There were unsuccessful attempts by the Italian residents of Harlem in the 1930s to improve their housing situation. They failed, resulting in their migration out of Harlem; highly unhealthy slums contributed to this. The Italian community living in Harlem who were seen in the streets as much as in their houses even established a "boys club" (started in 1927) in their midst to divert attention and to wean away the boys from the influence of the gangs. The Italian part of the Harlem constituted immigrants of 64 regional societies in 1934 and many of them observed festivals in the church of mount Carmel. They were also segregated from the Spanish part of the Harlem.

In 1931, Dutch Schultz, a mobster, exercised control over the wealth of Harlem residents with perpetration of violence and blackmail involving banks, restaurants, and clubs, taking advantage of his political and police contacts. After he was killed in 1935, the mantle of control fell on the Genovese Crime Family, who ruled the roost for the next 50 years.

During World War II, newspapers like The New York Times sensationalized the crime situation and claimed that it was going up. However, the ground situation did not reflect this view, because in 1942, there was a reduction in crime rate.

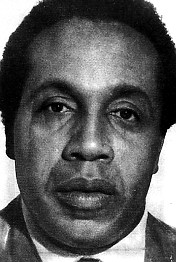
Frank Lucas, a Harlem gangster

Like in Chicago, New York City during the mid 20th century saw a dramatic increase in organized criminal rackets and the gangsters of Harlem have been among the most notorious in American history. Gangsters such as Frank Lucas, hailed as the "baddest dude on the mean streets of Harlem", operated a gang that smuggled heroin into the states from Vietnam in US warplanes in the late 1960s and early 1970s. Major riots broke out in Harlem in 1964, violently suppressed by the police.

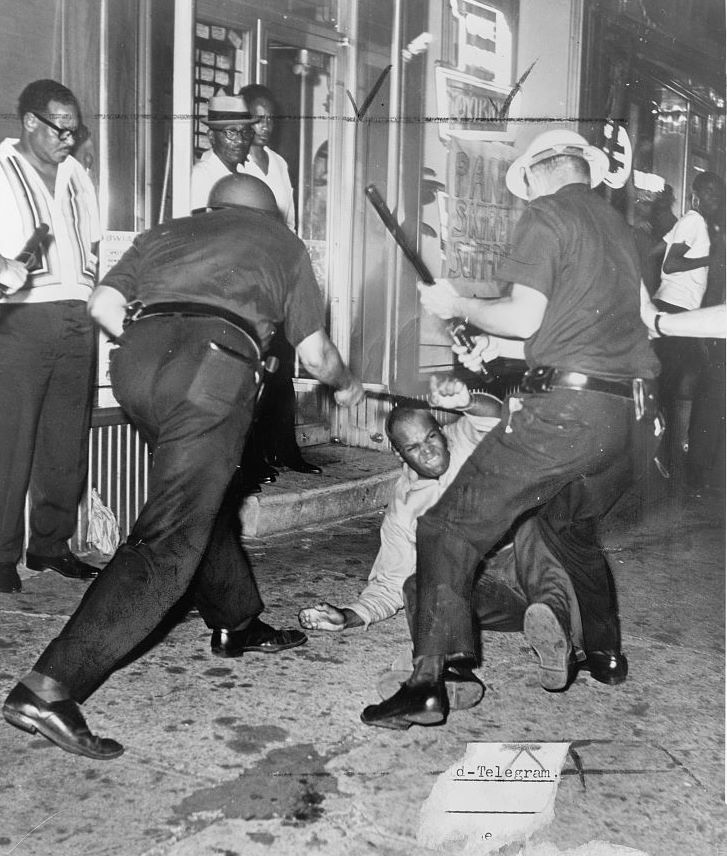
Harlem Riots of 1964

Cheap crack cocaine in East Harlem, which became a major issue in the 1980s, as author Russell Leigh Sharman puts it was "largely responsible for the devaluation of human life in East Harlem: it radically affected the economy of violence in relation to the illegal drug trade."

Since New York City's revival in the late 20th century, greater Harlem has been experiencing social and economic gentrification. However, Harlem still suffers from many social problems. Large portions of the population receive a form of income support from the government, with 34.9%, 43.3%, and 46.5% of the populations of West, Central, and East Harlem receiving aid.

== Organized crime ==
There are many gangs in Harlem, often based in housing projects, such as 4thBlocc/9Blocc (Carver Houses); 1040 (Jefferson Houses); ChicoGang (Wagner Houses); EastArmy (East River Houses); BroadDayShooters (Washington Houses); TrainedToGo (Douglass) Houses); WuskiGang (Johnson Houses); TaftGhanistan (Taft Houses); Las Vegas (Lehman Houses), 2Woo (Drew Hamilton Houses) & 3Stacks (Grant Houses). When one gang member is killed or injured by another gang, revenge violence erupts, which can last for years. The East Harlem Purple Gang of the 1970s, which operated in East Harlem and surroundings, was an Italian American group of hitmen and heroin dealers.

== Services ==
There are six subcommittees dealing with the key issues in greater Harlem. These are "crime and police, health and hospitals, housing and recreation, education, discrimination in employment, and discrimination in relief." Harlem is patrolled by five precincts of the New York City Police Department. Manhattanville and Hamilton Heights are covered by the 30th Precinct. while East Harlem South is patrolled by the 25th Precinct. Central Harlem North is covered by the 28th Precinct while Central Harlem South is patrolled by the 32nd Precinct. East Harlem North is covered by the 23rd Precinct while East Harlem South is patrolled by the 25th Precinct.

The Harlem Community Justice Center identifies problems and seeks solutions for a variety of crimes and disputes in East and Central Harlem. The multi-jurisdictional civil and family court offers programs in conflict resolution, financial support, at-risk youth, and re-entry for ex-offenders. Its goal is to work together with a community in order to facilitate neighborhood renewal.

Y.U.N.G Harlem is a non-profit organization that advocates for the area's youth while also providing leadership resources. The organization's leaders were honored at Black Entertainment Television's 3rd annual "Black Girls Rock" awards.

== In music ==
Like the Bronx, Harlem and its gangsters have a strong link to hip hop, rap, and R&B culture in the United States, and many successful rappers in the music industry came from gangs in Harlem. Gangsta rap, which has its origins in the late 1980s, often has lyrics that are "misogynistic or that glamorize violence", glamorizing guns, drugs and vulnerable women in Harlem and New York City. In 2022, drill music, a subgenre of rap music flourishing in New York City, was blamed by Mayor Eric Adams for glorifying and even contributing to increased violence in communities like Harlem.

== See also ==
- Dirty Thirty (NYPD)
