= Church of Our Lady Queen of Angels (New York City) =

Church in Manhattan, New York

Coordinates: 40.795335°N 73.940428°W

The Church of Our Lady Queen of Angels
- Interactive map of the The Church of Our Lady Queen of Angels area

General information
- Location: Manhattan, New York, United States of America
- Client: Roman Catholic Archdiocese of New York

The Church of Our Lady Queen of Angels is a former Catholic parish church under the authority of the Archdiocese of New York, located at 228 East 113th Street in Manhattan, New York City.

== History ==
At the time the parish was founded in 1886, East Harlem was still a relatively rural area. Archbishop Michael Corrigan asked the Capuchin friar Bonaventure Frey to establish a national parish for German Catholics Catholics who had moved north from Yorkville.

The Neo-Romanesque church was built and staffed by the Capuchin Friars. It was the third Capuchin parish in the city.

The church is located on the end of a cul-de-sac and is surrounded by the Jefferson Houses, a public housing project that was completed in 1959.

Although the church closed in 2007, the parish school remains open. Our Lady Queen of Angels School is a member of Partnership Schools, a network of nine Catholic PreK-8 schools serving Cleveland and New York.

Our Lady Queen of Angels convent is occupied by the Franciscan Sisters of the Renewal, who operate the "Fr. Solanus Soup Kitchen".
