= Dirty Thirty (NYPD) =

New York City police scandal

Dirty Thirty Nannery's Raiders
- Named after: Kevin P. Nannery
- Founding location: New York City, New York
- Years active: 1992–1993
- Territory: Harlem, New York
- Membership: 33 officers arrested, 15 officers indicted
- Activities: civil rights conspiracy, perjury, extortion, drug trafficking, tax evasion, bribery, robbery and larceny

The Dirty Thirty was a police corruption conspiracy that took place between 1992 and 1995 in the New York City Police Department's 30th Precinct, serving Harlem, and resulted in the largest collection of police officers charged with corruption in New York City in almost a decade. A group of rogue officers, led by Sergeant Kevin P. Nannery, participated in various unlawful activities, including civil rights conspiracy, perjury, extortion, grand larceny and the possession and distribution of narcotics. The scandal led to a number of arrests of police officers and two suicides.

== Background ==
The "Dirty 30" were mostly stationed at the 30th Precinct in Harlem, Upper Manhattan. At the time, the area was known as the “cocaine capital of the world” to locals and law enforcement. Police corruption was extremely high around this time, and the Mollen Commission was created to help investigate and eradicate corruption within the NYPD.

== Nannery's Raiders ==
Sergeant Kevin Nannery was among police supervisors who participated in the criminal conspiracy. His subordinate officers adopted the moniker "Nannery's Raiders", and participated in "booming" – making bogus radio calls to cover up illegal search and seizures on known drug dealers' apartments, where they took drugs and large amounts of cash but did not enter their seizures into evidence. Instead, they sold the drugs from the 30th Precinct itself at half-market price in order to further their own profit.

...a gram of powdered cocaine sells for $50 to $90. In the 30th, the price is $20 to $25. An ounce, or a little more than 28 grams, goes for up to $1,200 elsewhere, more than twice what the best wholesale customers pay in the 30th Precinct. A kilogram – 1,000 grams, 2.2 pounds – can cost up to $22,000. But in the 30th Precinct kilos often go for $16,000 to $18,000.

— DEA

In one case, Sergeant Nannery and two officers stopped a man in an apartment complex and took his keys before ransacking his apartment without a warrant. They let the man go after taking several thousand dollars' worth of drugs and cash. They also participated in various extortion schemes, with illegal drug wholesalers giving the officers weekly payoffs that ranged anywhere from $600–$1,000.

A squad car would pull up to a corner where these guys were working and just sit there," the investigator said. "Business had to halt. Sooner or later one of the guys would start talking, feeling out the officer. Maybe they could work something out. Maybe the cop should stop by a certain bodega. The cop goes away. He doesn't bother the corner again. At the end of the week he goes to the bodega and gets his money.

— The New York Times

== Investigation and arrests ==
In 1993, officer "Otto" Barry Brown went undercover in an investigation in to the Dirty 30. The two-year investigation included sting and surveillance operations. On the day of Sept 28, 1994, 29 police officers were arrested and five of them pled guilty. In total, 33 officers were arrested by the conclusion of the investigation. Due to the investigations outcome, 30 officers who were involved in 50 criminal cases had to be thrown out of court.

=== Officers and charges ===
Name	Charges
Sgt. Kevin P. Nannery	4 counts 1st deg. perjury, civil rights conspiracy
Sgt. Richard J. McGauley	1st deg. perjury, civil rights conspiracy
Officer D. Benitez	extortion
Officer Edward M. Checke	1st deg. perjury
Officer George H. Eckerson	civil rights conspiracy
Officer Justine A. Fazzini	1st deg. perjury, civil rights conspiracy
Officer Theodore Giovanniello	1st deg. perjury, civil rights conspiracy
Officer Kevin Kay	civil rights conspiracy, tax evasion
Officer William H. Knox	1st deg. perjury, civil rights conspiracy, possession of narcotics, misprision of a felony
Officer Thomas J. Nolan	1st deg. perjury, civil rights conspiracy
Officer Armando Palacio	1st deg. perjury
Officer Steven L. Pataki	1st deg. perjury
Officer Blake C. Struller	3rd deg. grand larceny, civil rights conspiracy, narcotics distribution, tax evasion
Officer Joseph M. Walsh	1st deg. perjury, civil rights conspiracy, tax evasion

== See also ==
- Crime in Harlem
