= Capuchin Soup Kitchen =

Nonprofit organization in Detroit, Michigan, US

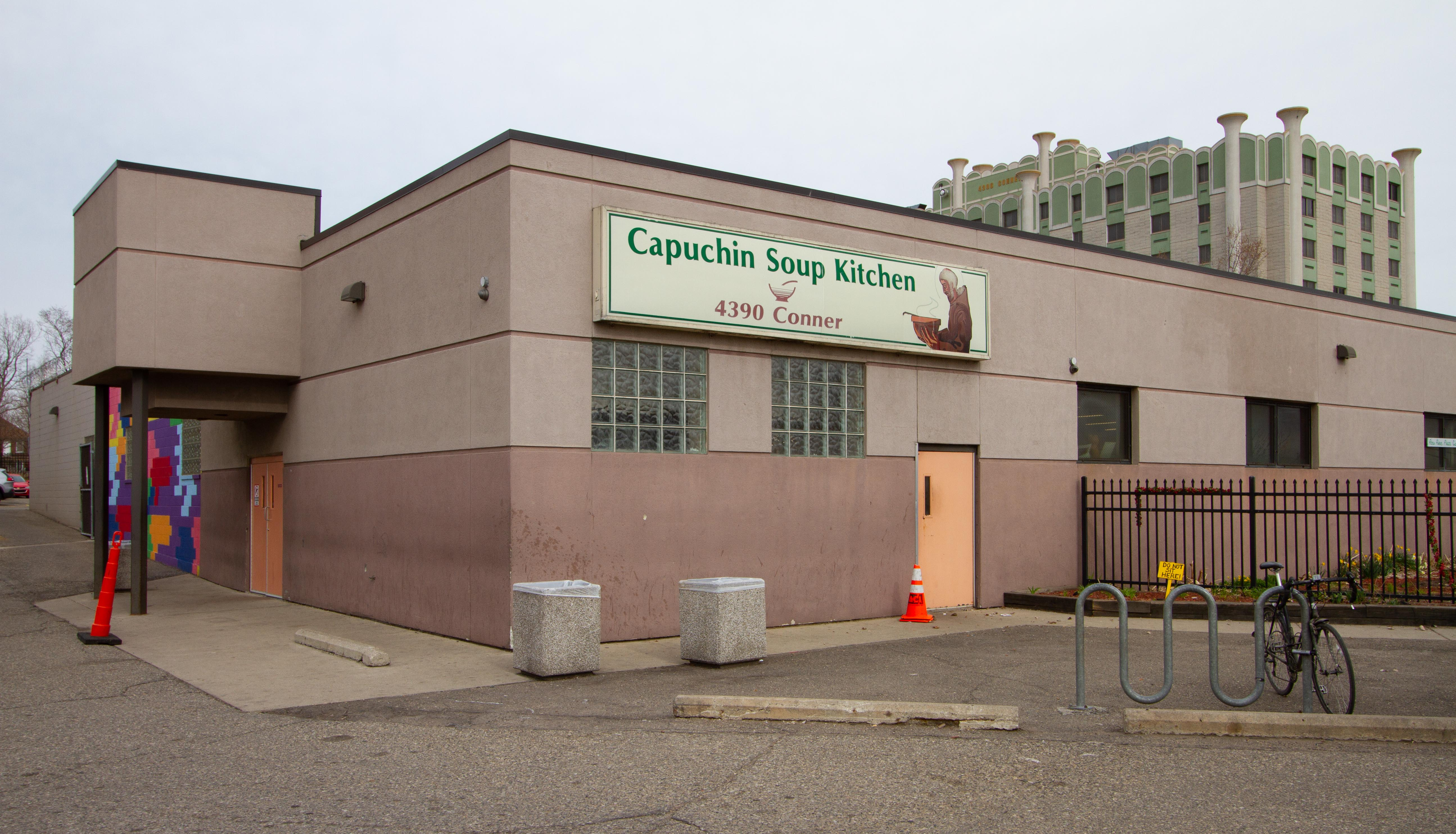
- Capuchin Soup Kitchen's Conner Street location
- Formation: 1929
- Founders: Solanus Casey, OFM, Cap. and Herman Buss, OFM, Cap.
- Type: Nonprofit
- Purpose: Humanitarian
- Headquarters: 1820 Mount Elliot St. Detroit, MI
- Executive Director: Br. Gary Wegner, OFM, Cap.
- Parent organization: Capuchin Franciscan Province of St. Joseph
- Affiliations: Gleaners Community Food Bank Detroit Agricultural Network
- Revenue: ($288,786 2018)
- Website: cskdetroit.org

The Capuchin Soup Kitchen (CSK) is a religiously affiliated soup kitchen and non-profit organization located in Detroit, Michigan. It was founded by the Capuchin friars to provide food for the poor during the Great Depression and is sponsored by the Capuchin Franciscan Province of St. Joseph. While it was initially established as a soup kitchen, CSK now includes a food and clothing bank, a drug rehabilitation program, and an after school and summer youth program. Through its various ministries CSK serves approximately 560,000 individuals each year.

== History ==
The Capuchin Soup Kitchen was founded in 1929 by Capuchin friars Solanus Casey and Herman Buss. CSK was started in order to address the needs of Detroit's poor population during the Great Depression. The friars at St. Bonaventure Monastery initially established the kitchen informally by providing food from their own stores, as was the expectation in their order. As the porter of the monastery, Casey would provide each person who came seeking assistance with a cup of coffee and a sandwich.

The line outside of the Capuchin Monastery eventually grew up to 2,000 people each day, making it infeasible for the friars to serve everyone from the monastery kitchen. Herman Buss, who served as the spiritual director for the Secular Franciscans, requested their assistance in creating a formal soup kitchen. With the Franciscans' help the friars were able to move their services into the Third Order Hall facility located next to the monastery chapel. The Capuchin Soup Kitchen first officially opened its doors on November 2, 1929. Buss was appointed the first director of the soup kitchen while Casey continued to serve the monastery as porter. Capuchin friar Mathias Nack, OFM, Cap., the guardian of St. Bonaventure Monastery, took over the position of director in 1933. In order to sustain the work being done at CSK the Capuchin Charity Guild was created in 1942 to raise funds for the soup kitchen.

The Capuchin Soup Kitchen has moved from the Third Order Hall and currently has two facilities for its meal program. In the 1970s, the soup kitchen expanded its services to include Jefferson House, a drug rehabilitation program for indigent men. In 2006, Raymond Stadmeyer, OFM, Cap., helped to create the R.O.P.E (Reaching Our Potential Everyday) Program associated with the Capuchin Soup Kitchen's On the Rise Bakery. On November 18, 2017, the Capuchin Soup Kitchen's Co-founder Solanus Casey, OFM, Cap., was beatified at Ford Field with 60,000–70,000 people in attendance.

== Programs and services ==
There are seven distinct programs within the Capuchin Soup Kitchen. The programs are designed to meet the different needs of Detroit's underprivileged communities.

=== Meal Programs ===
The Capuchin Soup Kitchen has two sites which serve 2,000 meals a day, the Jefferson House site and the On The Rise Bakery site.

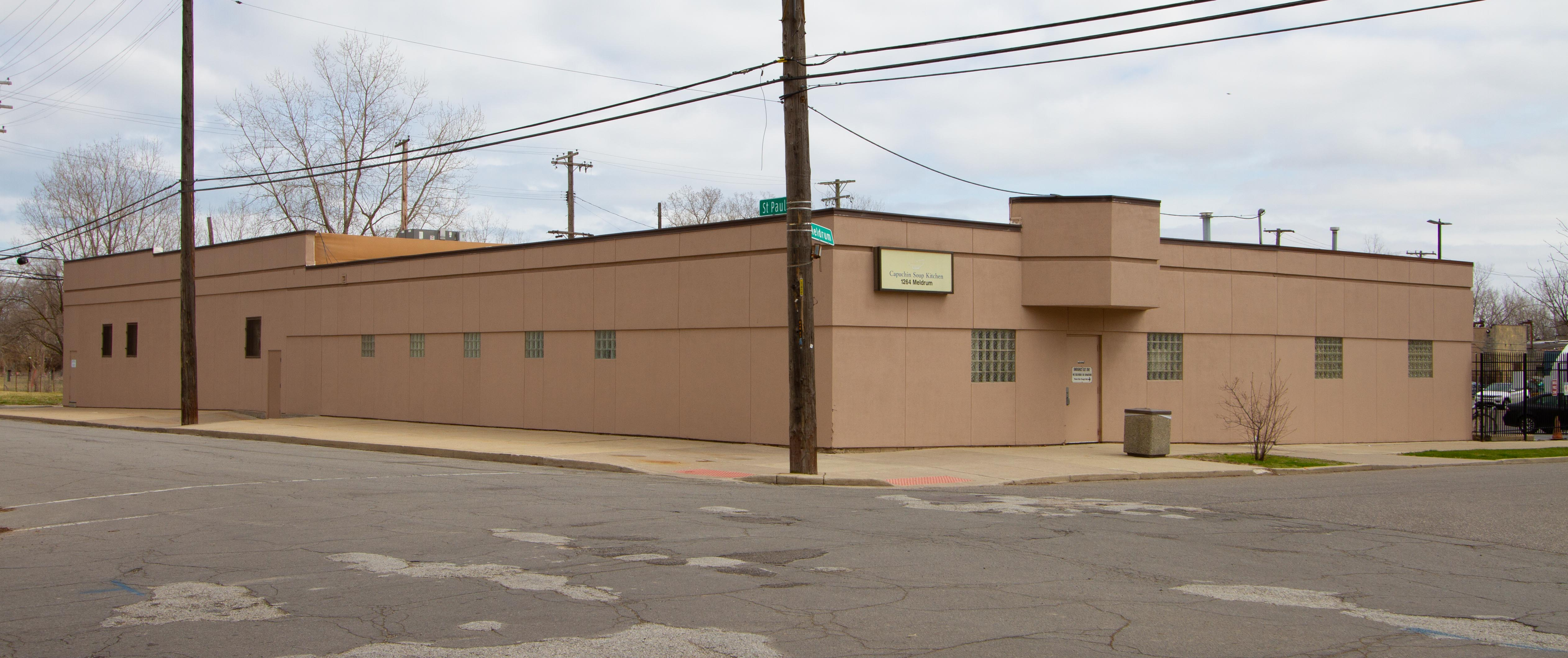
Capuchin Soup Kitchen's Meldrum Street location

=== Meldrum Soup Kitchen ===
The Meldrum soup kitchen was started in 1929 by Solanus Casey, OFM, Cap. during the Great Depression, making it the first program launched by the Capuchin Soup Kitchen. It is located one block from the original soup kitchen location on Mt. Elliot and is handicap accessible. Those using the service are mostly poor men and the kitchen serves approximately 600 meals a day.

=== Conner Soup Kitchen ===
The Conner Kitchen was opened in early 1998 and serves working families and seniors. One-third of its meals are served to children 12 and under.

=== On the Rise Bakery & R.O.P.E Program ===
On the Rise Bakery is run by members of the Capuchin's ROPE (Reaching Our Potential Everyday) program which assists participants in learning marketable skills. The bakery proceeds are spent on housing, training, counseling and other services for ROPE participants. Each member is responsible for supporting and mentoring newer additions through the program and the bakery.

=== Earthworks Urban Farm ===
Earthworks Urban Farm was founded in 1997. Located near the headquarters of the Capuchin Franciscans, the farm consists in eight gardens spread over 20 city blocks. Earthworks produce vegetables, small fruits, tree fruits, herbs and cut flowers which help to provide meals for the needy people serviced by the Capuchin Soup Kitchen. The farm also sells some products to the farmers market, Grown In Detroit Co-op, and at health clinics. Earthworks use their own harvested berries to make jam to help raise funds for CSK.

=== Capuchin Services Center ===
The Capuchin Services Center assists 228,000 of Detroit neighbors annually with emergency food and clothing. They distribute food and basic necessity-of-life items to poor people based on their family size. They also distribute furniture and clothing.

=== Jefferson House ===
Jefferson House is a twelve-bed residential treatment facility for substance abuse which accommodates poverty-stricken males seeking to reclaim their lives from addiction.

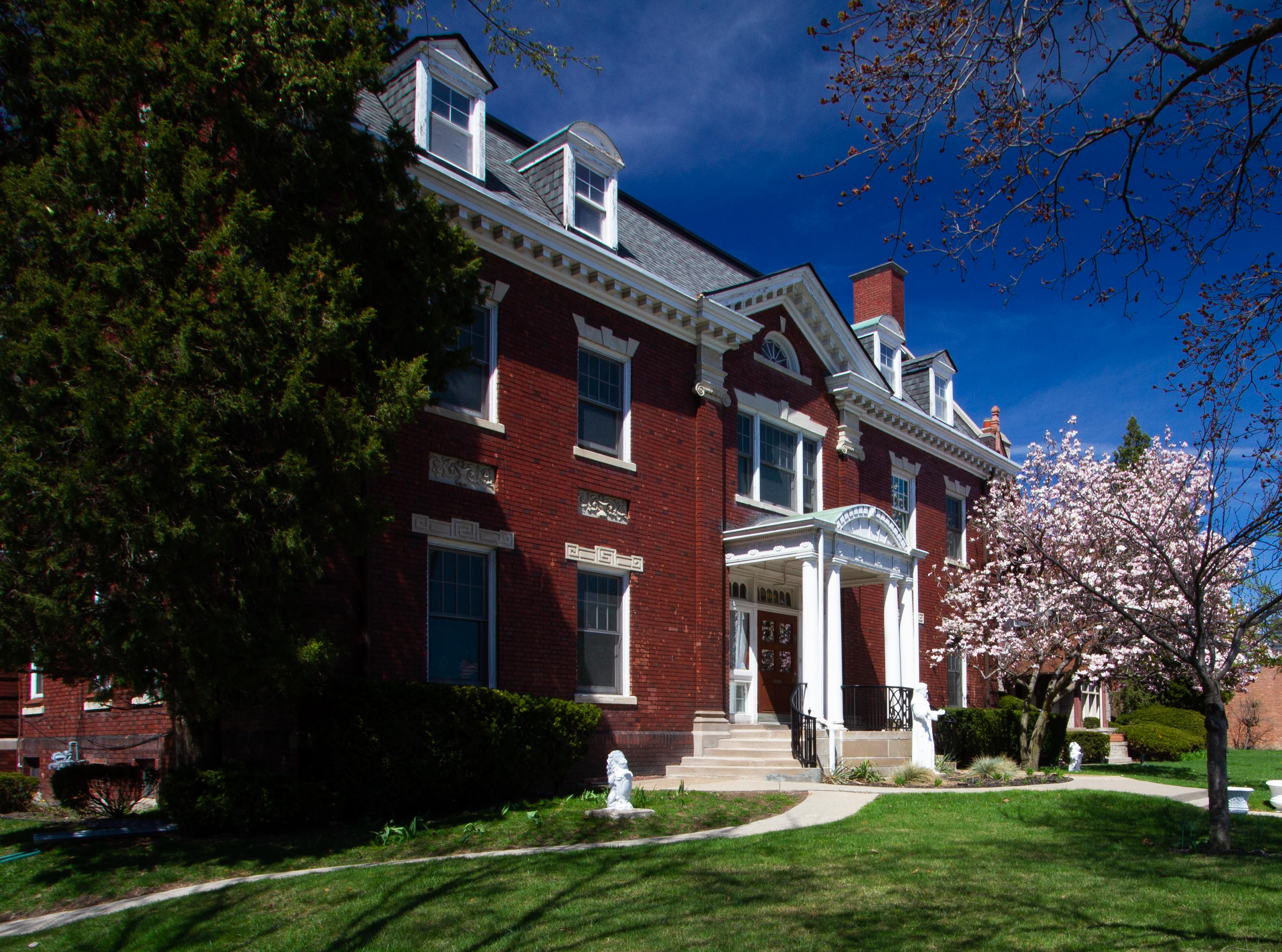
Capuchin Soup Kitchen's Jefferson House residential substance use disorder treatment center

=== Rosa Parks Children's Program ===
Rosa Parks Children's Program caters children from 6 to 12 years old to enhance their art skills and reading skills. They host a Summer Peace Camp which is a 3-week program where they teach children on channelizing their energy by learning how to cope with violence through art, music, and dance.

=== Spiritual Care ===
Spiritual Care provides spiritual health services for those who seek the spiritual guidance of St. Francis of Assisi.

== Partnerships, sponsorships, and grants ==
To assist in raising funds and to enlist volunteer workers to support its programs and services, Capuchin Soup Kitchen has partnered with several international, national, and regional businesses. They have also received government and business grants in support of their agricultural and legal programs. Additionally, the CSK is affiliated with other Detroit-based non-profit organizations that primarily support their soup kitchen and agricultural programs.

=== Corporate business sponsors and partnerships ===
==== Automobile companies ====
Between 2005 and 2014, corporate automobile companies such as General Motors (GM), Chrysler Group, and Ford Motor Company and/or their executive leadership made significant monetary contributions to the Capuchin Soup Kitchen. These contributions facilitated the organization by providing various food, career training, basic quality of life services and programs to needy Detroit citizens. These companies have offered incentives to their employees to encourage them to volunteer at the CSK.

==== Bob Evans Inc. ====
In 2013, the Capuchin Soup Kitchen partnered with the Bob Evans Restaurant brand, a subsidiary of Bob Evans Inc., who helped to pay for the renovation of the CSK's Conner Avenue facility, home of the Rosa Parks Children and Youth Program.

==== DTE Energy and DNV GL ====
In July 2016, DTE Energy and DNV GL partnered with the Capuchin Soup Kitchen for an energy-efficiency project where DNV GL donated energy-efficient commercial ovens, fryers, a dishwasher, natural gas, water heaters and LED lighting to the charity in an effort to reduce energy costs. In 2009, the DTE Energy Foundation donated $36,074 to the CSK from funds raised during their annual holiday fund-raising drive.

==== Kroger ====
Capuchin Soup Kitchen has received food donations as a community partner of the Kroger company who sponsors the Zero Hunger Zero Waste Program.

=== Local Detroit business partnerships ===
Sponsorship of the Capuchin Souper Summer Celebration by the Michigan-based business, Ahee Jewelry Co. raised approximately $3.5 million for the charity between 1981 and 2001.

Since 1976, Buddy's Pizza, a Detroit area restaurant chain, has hosted the annual "Slice for Life" fundraiser in support of CSK raising over $3 million for the charity.

The Detroit radio station WMGC-FM (105.1) hosts the annual Capuchin Soup Kitchen Radiothon which raises money every year in support of the Capuchin Soup Kitchen.

==== Grants ====
In 2003, the U.S. Department of Agriculture, Agriculture Secretary awarded a $150,000 grant to the Capuchin Soup Kitchen for a project that served to advance urban agriculture in Detroit through home and community gardens which includes tiling services, seed saving, seedling production, gardening workshops, community tool banks, resource centers, and model gardens.

In February 2016, The Community Foundation for Southeast Michigan approved a $50,000 grant to the CSK to support a partnership providing free legal services to the homeless.

In October 2016, Mahindra North American Technical Center awarded a $12,500 grant to the CSK Earthworks Urban Farm Agriculture Training Program to support a nine-month program to train urban farmers and food entrepreneurs.

==== Partnered Nonprofit Affiliates ====
Gleaners Community Food Bank in Detroit (a non-profit food bank), provides tons of food to the Capuchin Soup Kitchen every month in support of their soup kitchen operations.

The Capuchin Soup Kitchen is part of the Detroit Agricultural Network, a partnership between The Greening of Detroit, Earthworks Capuchin Soup Kitchen and Michigan State University Extension, through which its Detroit Garden Resource Program provides families and community gardeners with low-cost seeds, compost and classes.

== Legal Cases ==
In 2001, a former Capuchin Soup Kitchen Financial Director, Francis Elias, and a former executive director of CSK, Lewis Hickson Jr., were found guilty of embezzling more than $800,000 between 1992 and 1996 from the organization. Elias was sentenced to two years in prison, two years of supervised release and issued a $25,000 fine while Hickson received 14 months in prison and two years of supervised release. Both men were ordered to repay $828,267 to CSK and the Federal Emergency Management Agency, a contributor to the CSK food bank.

== Impact and demographics ==
The Capuchin Soup Kitchen serves men, women, and children that are homeless, poverty-stricken, or both. Volunteers and members live and work with the poor and aid all people regardless of race, sex, age, color, national origin, religious preference, handicap or level of income. CSK also assists those who have been prisoners or addicts through On the Rise Bakery, offering counseling and educational opportunities.

=== Statistics ===
The organization has reported that they annually serve 560,000 individuals while also supplying 228,000 people with food and clothing in the Detroit area through programs and services. Approximately 2,000 hot meals are served each day and 300,000 pounds of groceries, 30,000 pieces of clothing, and over 500 pieces of furniture and appliances are given away to poor families every month. Eight soup kitchens feed about 20,000 people per week. This is equivalent to about 1,500 meals a day or 300,000 hungry people a year who are in the Detroit area. This allows their clientele to be offered three meals a day, six times a week. Earthworks provides and grows food for the CSK through three gardens on a 2.5 acre certified organic farm. 160-180 families are served per day which is equal to 3,600 to 4000 families a month with the help of their partnerships with large food organizations.

=== Funds ===
The Capuchin Soup Kitchen receives no government subsidiaries to support its programs and services therefore depending financially on donations and their revenue earned from their own programs such as On The Rise Bakery. CSK's revenue was reported as $288,786 in 2018.

=== The Capuchin Services Center ===
The Capuchin Services Center functions similar to a grocery store where individuals in need are allotted free food and clothing depending on family size. It has reach-in freezers and coolers with bread racks and pastries. Corporate business chains, Kroger groceries and Kohl's clothing stores have donated storage shelves, food and clothing racks, and suspension bars to the facility, which provides the center the look of a retail environment.

=== Legal aid/assistance ===
Capuchin Soup Kitchen offers legal assistance to help those with issues such as traffic tickets, child support, landlord/tenant, and social security. Volunteer attorneys, legal assistants and paralegals from Dykema, Kitch, Dickinson Wright, Jaffe, Clark & Schoenbeck, and Ford Motor Company's Office of General Counsel provide legal advice. CSK's locations also have showers, and a change of clothing for the homeless/poor people for up to 30 days. They also service up to 800 children a month with the use of the children's library and art therapy studio.
