= St. Bonaventure Monastery =

- U.S. National Register of Historic Places
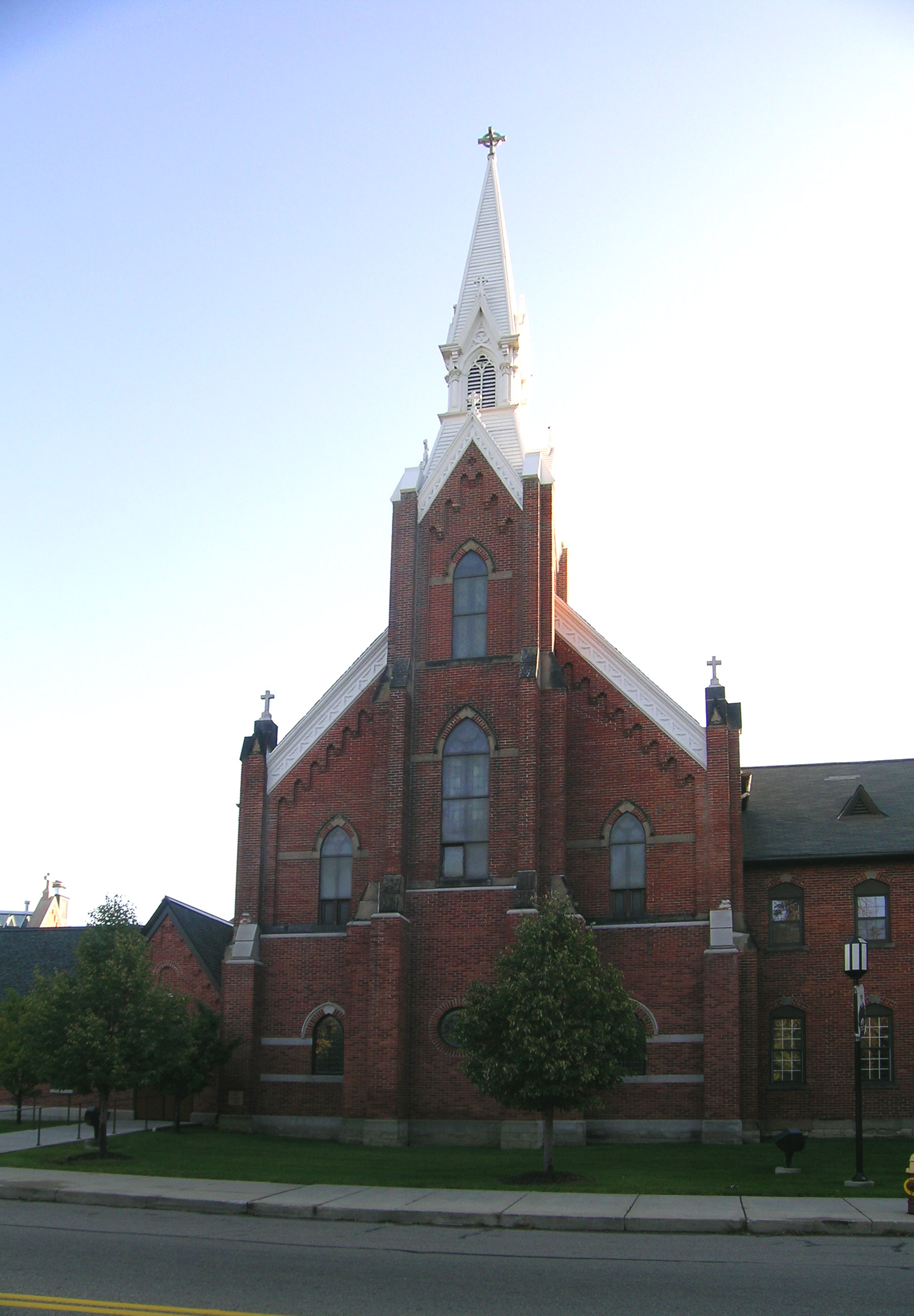
- Interactive map
- Location: Detroit, Michigan United States
- Coordinates: 42°21′4″N 83°0′52″W
- Built: 1883
- Architect: Peter Dederichs Jr.
- Architectural style: Gothic Revival
- NRHP reference No.: 82000554
- Added to NRHP: December 02, 1982

The St. Bonaventure Monastery is a complex of religious buildings, built for the Order of Friars Minor Capuchin, located at 1740 Mt. Elliott Avenue in Detroit, Michigan. It was listed on the National Register of Historic Places in 1982.

== History ==
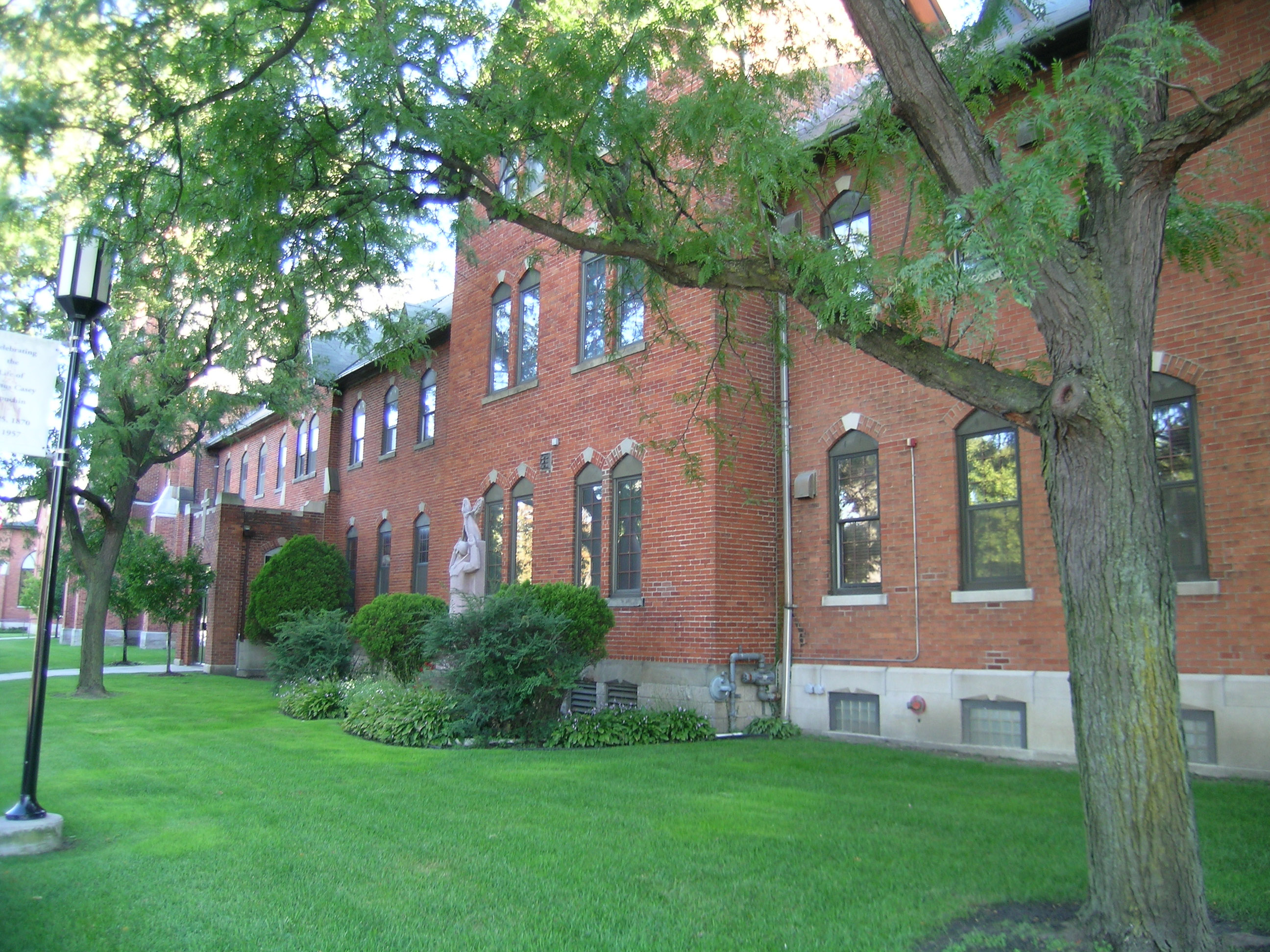
Monastery on Mt. Elliott

St. Bonaventure Monastery was established in 1882, one of a number of late 19th century Roman Catholic institutions established in Detroit. At the time, the Capuchin friars wrote to then-Bishop of Detroit Caspar Borgess, seeking permission to establish a community of the Order in his diocese. The bishop responded by suggesting that they could serve as chaplains for the Eastside Historic Cemetery District and build a monastery in the city. The friars accepted the suggestion and were granted permission to start working in the diocese. In 1882 they moved into a small house on the cemetery grounds until the following year, when the monastery, sited across the street, was habitable.

The monastery was originally intended to serve the area's Catholic clergy and churches, but also provided emergency aid to the poor. During the Great Depression, the monastery was a major source of relief for poor East-Side workers. By 1931 the monastery was providing as many as 3,500 free meals per day through its soup kitchen.

== Blessed Solanus Casey ==
The monastery is also significant because of its association with Blessed Solanus Casey, OFMCap. Solanus Casey was a Capuchin friar who served as the monastery porter 1924-1946, meeting visitors at the friary door. He also helped out at the Soup Kitchen, comforting the hungry, and was instrumental in obtaining food and supplies for the kitchen during the Great Depression. In 1966, his beatification process opened. On July 8, 1987, Father Solanus Casey's body was exhumed and found to be incorrupt. His body was clothed in a new religious habit, placed in a steel casket, and re-interred beneath the north transept at St. Bonaventure's, where prayers are offered for the intercession of Fr. Solanus. Fr. Solanus was beatified in Detroit on November 18, 2017.

== Description ==
St. Bonaventure Monastery consists of three buildings: the 1883 Gothic-influenced monastery (completed in 1913), the 1908 Soup Kitchen, and the 1939 Third Order Hall. All three buildings are constructed of red brick on a hand-dressed limestone foundation with extensive limestone trim. The monastery complex also contains a tiny cemetery and a 1960 mission building.
