= Moxila A. Upadhyaya =

American judge (born 1988)

United States Magistrate Judge, United States District Court for the District of Columbia
- Incumbent
- Assumed office 2022

Personal details
- Born: Gujarat, India
- Education: Missouri School of Journalism (Bachelor of Journalism); University of Missouri (Bachelor of Arts); American University Washington College of Law (JD)

Moxila A. Upadhyaya is a United States magistrate judge. Before becoming a magistrate judge in September 2022, she was a partner at the law firm Venable LLP.

As a magistrate judge, Upadhyaya has presided over preliminary and limited matters for cases, including the arraignment in the federal prosecution of Donald Trump related to the 2020 election.

== Early life and education ==
Born in Gujarat, India, Moxila A. Upadhyaya was raised near Kansas City, Missouri. She studied at the University of Missouri and was awarded a Juris Doctor by American University Washington College of Law in 2003.

== Career ==
After graduating, she clerked for Eric Washington before working as a litigation lawyer and later becoming a partner at Venable LLP. In 2009, an organization Upadhyaya worked with as co-counsel pro bono in 2008, the Mid-Atlantic Innocence Project, awarded Upadhyaya their Defender of Innocence Award. Upadhyaya was a clerk for Robert Wilkins in the United States District Court for the District of Columbia in 2011.

She was appointed as a magistrate judge on September 7, 2022, and works at the E. Barrett Prettyman Federal Courthouse in Washington D.C. Since her appointment, she has served as a magistrate judge for several proceedings involving people charged with alleged offences committed during the January 6 United States Capitol attack.

The prosecution of Donald Trump on charges related to alleged interference in the 2020 presidential election was assigned to Judge Tanya S. Chutkan before the arraignment, on August 1, 2023. At the arraignment, Upadhyaya received the plea from Trump in response to the charges, set a schedule for pre-trial motions and discovery and set the terms of bail which did not include any cash bond or travel restrictions. At the hearing, Upadhyaya warned Trump against influencing witnesses through direct discussion or intimidation.

Upadhyaya has served on the Board of Directors for the D.C. Access to Justice Foundation and Council for Court Excellence. She was also a member of the Administrative Law Review.
