= Solanus Casey =

American Capuchin friar and priest

Blessed Solanus Casey OFMCap
- Born: Bernard Francis Casey; November 25, 1870; Oak Grove, Wisconsin, U.S.
- Died: July 31, 1957 (aged 86); Detroit, Michigan, U.S.
- Venerated in: Catholic Church
- Beatified: November 18, 2017, Detroit by Angelo Amato
- Major shrine: St. Bonaventure Monastery, Detroit
- Feast: July 30th

Solanus Casey, OFMCap (born Bernard Francis Casey; November 25, 1870 – July 31, 1957) was an American Catholic priest of the Order of Friars Minor Capuchin. He was known as a healer and for his abilities as a spiritual counselor, but especially for his great attention to the sick, for whom he celebrated special Masses. The friar was much sought after and revered, especially in Detroit, where he resided. He was also a noted lover of the violin, a trait he shared with his eponym, St Francis Solanus.

The cause for his sainthood commenced a few years after his death; he was officially recognized as Servant of God in 1982, and was declared venerable in 1995. After a miraculous healing attributed to him was approved by Pope Francis in 2017, he was beatified at Ford Field in Detroit on November 18, 2017.

== Life ==
=== Childhood ===
Bernard Francis Casey (nicknamed "Barney") was born on November 25, 1870, on a farm in Oak Grove, Wisconsin. He was the sixth of 16 children of Bernard James Casey and Ellen Elizabeth Murphy, both Irish immigrants. Bernard was baptized on December 18, 1870. The family lived in a three-room log cabin on a farm. Being devout Catholics, Bernard James and Ellen Casey started their days with family prayer and ended it with the Rosary and prayers at 7:00 p.m.

At age eight, Casey contracted diphtheria in 1878, leaving his voice wispy and slightly impaired. Two of his sisters died from the disease that year. The Casey family later moved to Hudson, Wisconsin. In 1878, he began school at Saint Mary's Parish in Hudson. Four years later, the family relocated again to Burkhardt, Wisconsin. Due to the needs of the farm, Casey had to wait for his elder brothers to finish school before he went. When the family farm suffered some crop failures, Casey dropped out of school without finishing in 1887 at age 17 to earn money.

After leaving school, Casey left for Stillwater, Minnesota, to find work. He labored in a lumber yard, a brickyard and in a hospital as an orderly. While employed as a prison guard in Minnesota, he befriended several inmates who said they were former accomplices of the outlaw Jesse James. During this period, he proposed marriage to a young girl who lived near Burkhardt, but the relationship ended when her mother suddenly enrolled her in a boarding school.

=== Studying for the priesthood ===
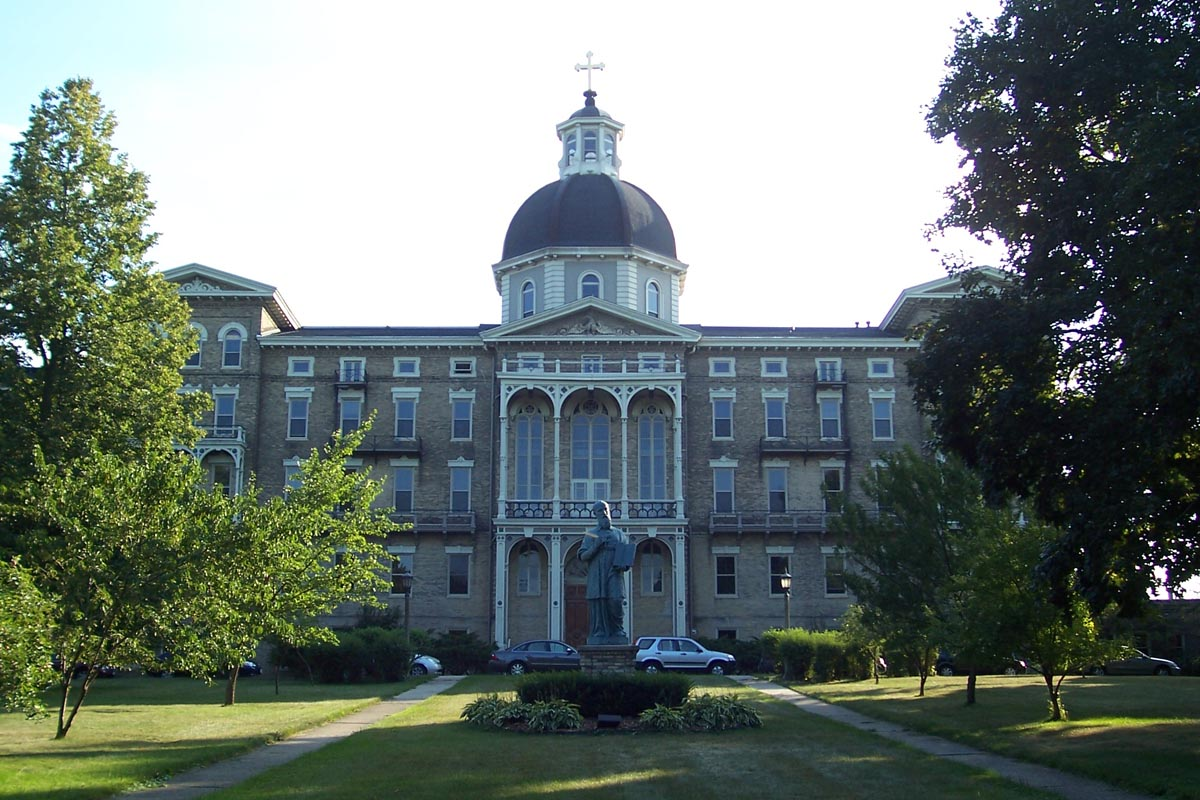
St. Francis de Sales Seminary, Milwaukee, Wisconsin

While working as a trolley driver in Superior, Wisconsin, Casey witnessed an intoxicated sailor stab a woman to death near the trolley tracks. The trauma of witnessing this crime forced him to grapple with the sin and hate of the world. He then decided that God was calling him to enter the priesthood. The problem was that Casey's formal education was very limited.

In 1892, at age 21, Casey entered Saint Francis High School Seminary in Milwaukee, Wisconsin. The minor seminary of the Archdiocese of Milwaukee, St. Francis included high school courses as well as some college ones. The classes consisted of boys who were much younger than Casey. He struggled due to the classes being taught in German or Latin, along with his limited educational background. St. Francis finally dismissed him. School officials advised Casey to join a religious order. He returned home to Burkhardt to consider his next move.

While reflecting before a statue of the Blessed Virgin Mary, a voice told him to "go to Detroit". Once in Detroit, Michigan, he applied for admission to the Order of Friars Minor Capuchin at the St. Bonaventure Monastery. They received him as a novice on January 14, 1897. Casey received the religious name of "Solanus" after Francis Solanus, a Franciscan missionary in the Spanish colony of Peru during the 18th century. The two men shared a love of the violin. Casey made his religious vows to the Capuchins on July 21, 1898.

=== Ordination ===
Casey struggled again with his studies at St. Bonaventure. For that reason, Archbishop Sebastian Messmer of Milwaukee decided that he should be ordained as a simplex priest. This meant that Casey could not preach during mass or hear confessions. Casey was ordained to the priesthood for the Capuchins on July 24, 1904, by Messmer at Saint Francis of Assisi Church in Milwaukee. Casey celebrated his first mass on July 31, 1904, in Appleton, Wisconsin, with his family present. However, the limits on his ordination meant that he would be best suited as a sacristan in a parish or a porter in a Capuchin community.

=== New York ===
After his ordination in 1904, the Capuchins assigned Casey to the Sacred Heart Parish in Yonkers, New York, where he served as sacristan and later doorkeeper. He also served as director of the Young Ladies Sodality and of the altar servers. While at Sacred Heart, he became involved in the Seraphic Mass Association. The idea was that members of the association would enjoy the benefits of the prayers of all the other members, along with the prayers and good works of the Capuchin priests and brothers. Casey would visit the sick in the parish, helping them with mass cards and praying for their healing. Many of these people started reporting the quick answers to these prayers and healings to the parish.

The Capuchins transferred Casey to Our Lady Queen of Angels Parish in the Harlem section of New York City in 1918. Benno Aichinger, the provincial superior for the Capuchins, started receiving more reports of miracles and conversions to Catholicism that were attributed to Casey. People started approaching Aichinger, asking for favors from Casey. Aichinger then asked Casey to start recording all these incidents in a journal. Expressing his humility, Casey said that the miracle cures were the results of the Seraphic Mass Association. However, they were only reported after Casey personally made the prayers.

=== Detroit ===
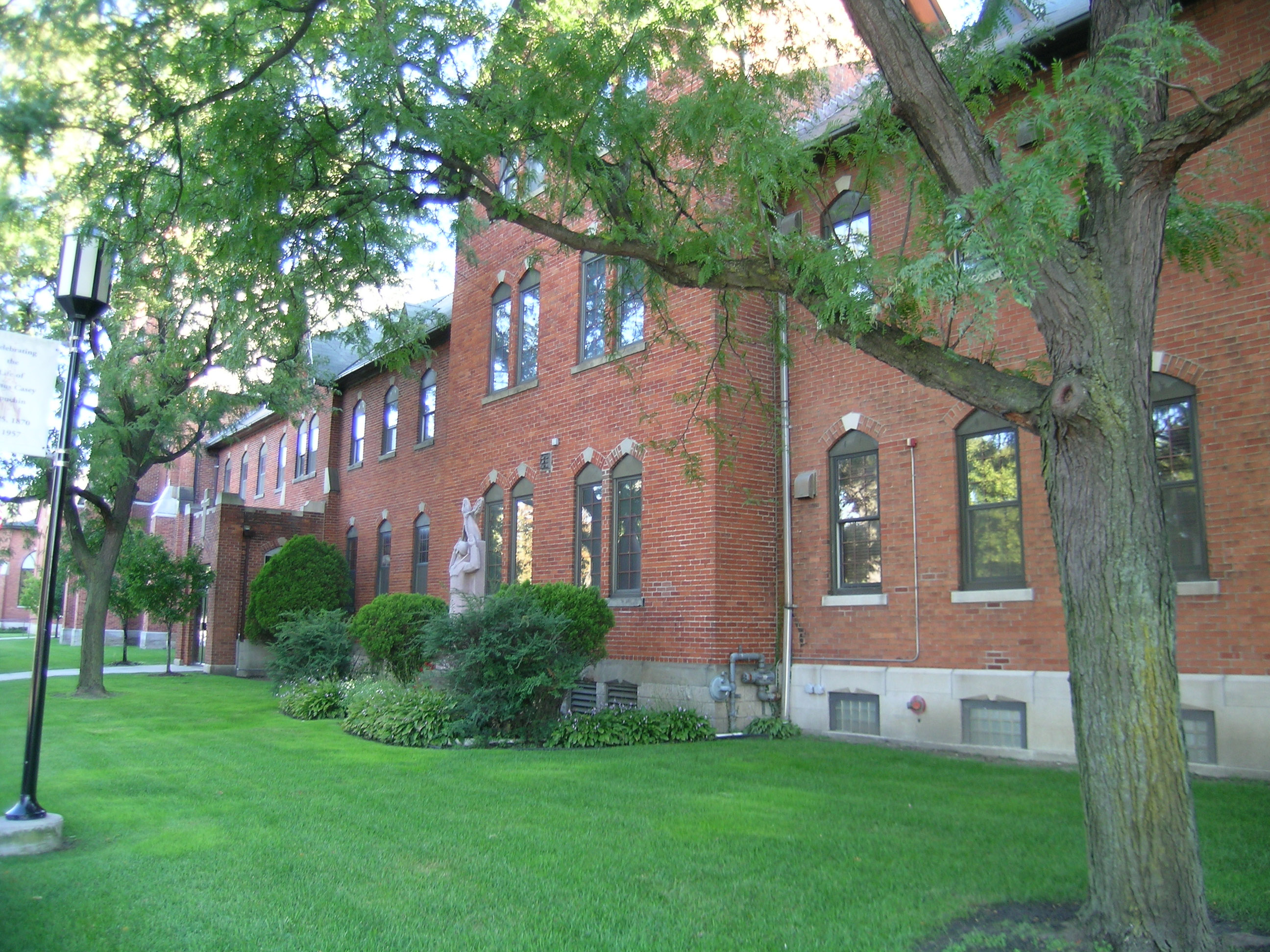
St. Bonaventure Monastery, Detroit, Michigan

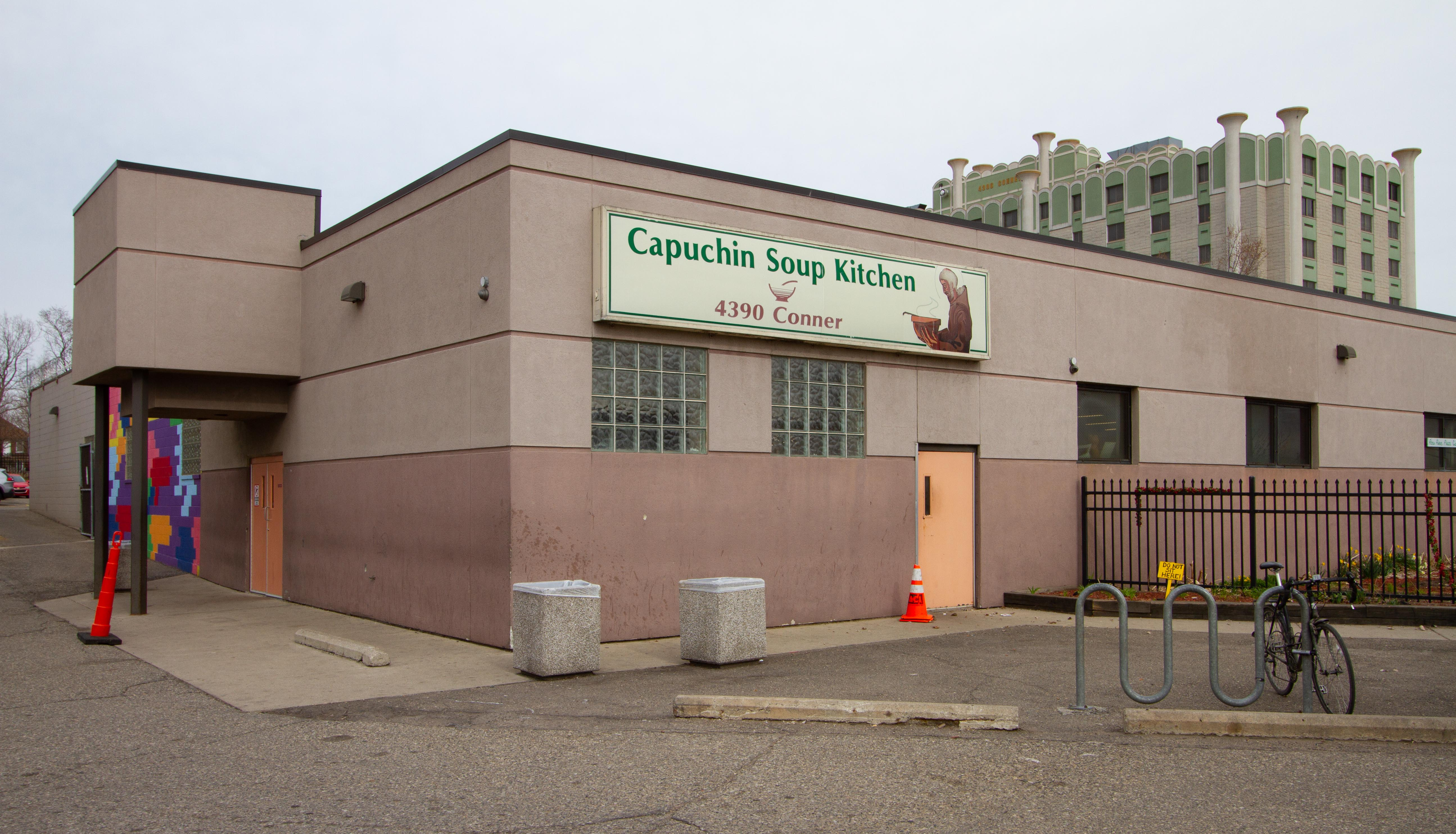
Capuchin Soup Kitchen (2019)

In 1924, the Capuchins sent Casey back to St. Bonaventure in Detroit, again to serve as sacristan and porter. Each Wednesday afternoon, he conducted well-attended services for the sick. People lined up to see him. Casey became known for his great compassion and simple holiness. People considered him instrumental in cures and other blessings. He loved to kneel before the Eucharist in the quiet of the night.

Casey record this reported miracle in 1926:

March 29, 1926, Joseph G., 24, reported hopelessly sick and dying in Providence Hospital with complications — kidney trouble principally — is enrolled . . . by his chum. . . . at the time a Russellite (Jehovah Witness) — who promised to do something specially pleasing to God if his friend is spared. Two days later he phones that the patient is back to consciousness and able to talk. A week elapses and he phones that his friend is actually reading the newspapers and feeling fine. Next day makes a profession of faith and abjures heresy and returns after seven years to reception of the Holy Sacraments. Both young men came to monastery today, healthy and happy. Thanks be to God.”

In 1929, at the start of the Great Depression, Casey co-founded the Capuchin Soup Kitchen in Detroit to feed the poor. As a violinist, he loved playing Irish songs for his fellow friars during recreation time but was not a gifted instrumentalist. He had a poor singing voice, due to his childhood bout with diphtheria. Casey could be found playing his violin in the chapel for the tabernacle. He ate little. Until his late seventies, he joined the younger religious in games of tennis and volleyball. Casey always promoted missions and was happy to extended his charity and concern to many non-Catholics. Casey made this journal entry in 1932 about a reported miracle:

“June 21, 1932, Joann Gietzen, fifteen months old, seemed paralyzed. Had never tried to stand or use her legs. Enrolled with promise of father to enroll her perpetually as soon as improvement noticed — and weekly instead of monthly Communion . . . One minute after these promises were made she stood alone on mother’s lap . . . next day started to walk."

After the American entry into World War II in 1941, Casey spent many hours consoling and praying with families of members of the armed services.

=== Final years ===
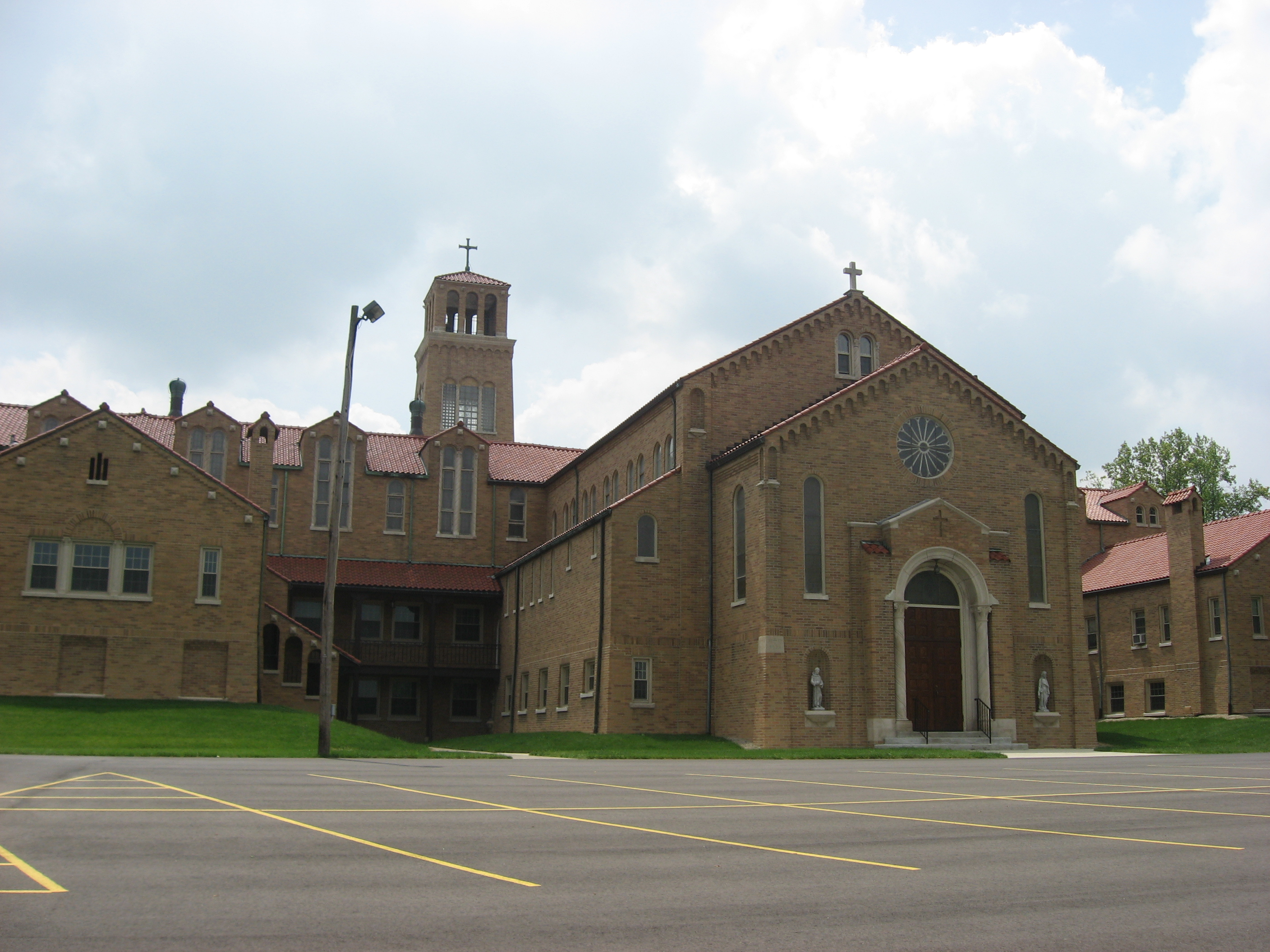
Former St. Felix Friary, Huntington, Indiana

By 1946, Casey was in failing health. To give him rest and reduce his exposure to the public, the Capuchins sent him to the novitiate of Saint Felix in rural Huntington, Indiana. However, he continued to minister to the sick in Indiana.

In 1957, Casey was rushed to the hospital due to a case of food poisoning. After his return to St. Felix, the friars noticed him walking much more slowly and scratching his legs constantly. They discovered that his skin was raw and infected; they sent him to St. John Hospital in Detroit.

The doctors at St. John diagnosed Casey with erysipelas. At one point, the condition was serious enough for them to consider a limb amputation. However, his ulcers began to heal and Casey was discharged. On July 2, 1957, he was readmitted to St. John Hospital due to the deterioration of his skin. On admission, he was given oxygen therapy. Casey's sister, Martha, came to St. John to visit him; the two prayed the rosary together.

=== Death ===
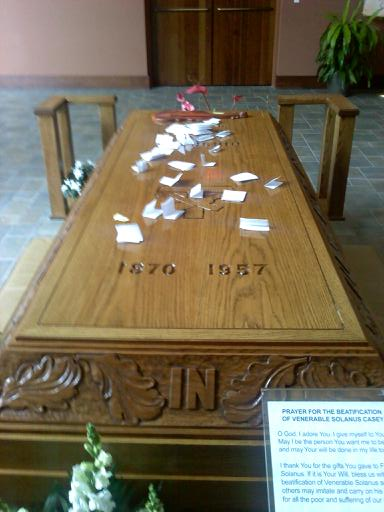
Casey's wooden casket (1987 to 2017)

Casey died from complications of erysipelas on July 31, 1957, at St. John Hospital. A commemorative plaque was placed outside the door of the room. His last words were reportedly: "I give my soul to Jesus Christ."

An estimated 20,000 people filed past Casey's coffin before his funeral and burial in the cemetery of his Detroit monastery.

In 1987, the Capuchins exhumed Casey's remains inside the chapel at St. Bonaventure Monastery; his remains showed no signs of the skin disease that afflicted him at the end of his life. They clothed the remains in a new habit before reinterment in a steel casket at the north transept.

The Capuchins exhumed the remains again in 2017, this time to collect first- and second-class relics. The remains were then placed in a new black casket with a plexiglass dome to make the new casket visible.

== Veneration ==
=== Beatification process ===
The Archdiocese of Detroit opened Casey's cause for beatification in 1976 by talking to witnesses and compiling documentation. The postulator for Casey's cause was his fellow Capuchin friar, Carlo Calloni. The Congregation for the Causes of Saints at the Vatican validated this phase of the process in 1986.

In early 1995, the Congregation received the positio. The cardinal and bishop members of the Congregation of the Causes of Saints did confirmed it in June 1995. On July 11, 1995, Pope John Paul II confirmed that Casey had lived a life of heroic virtue and titled him venerable.

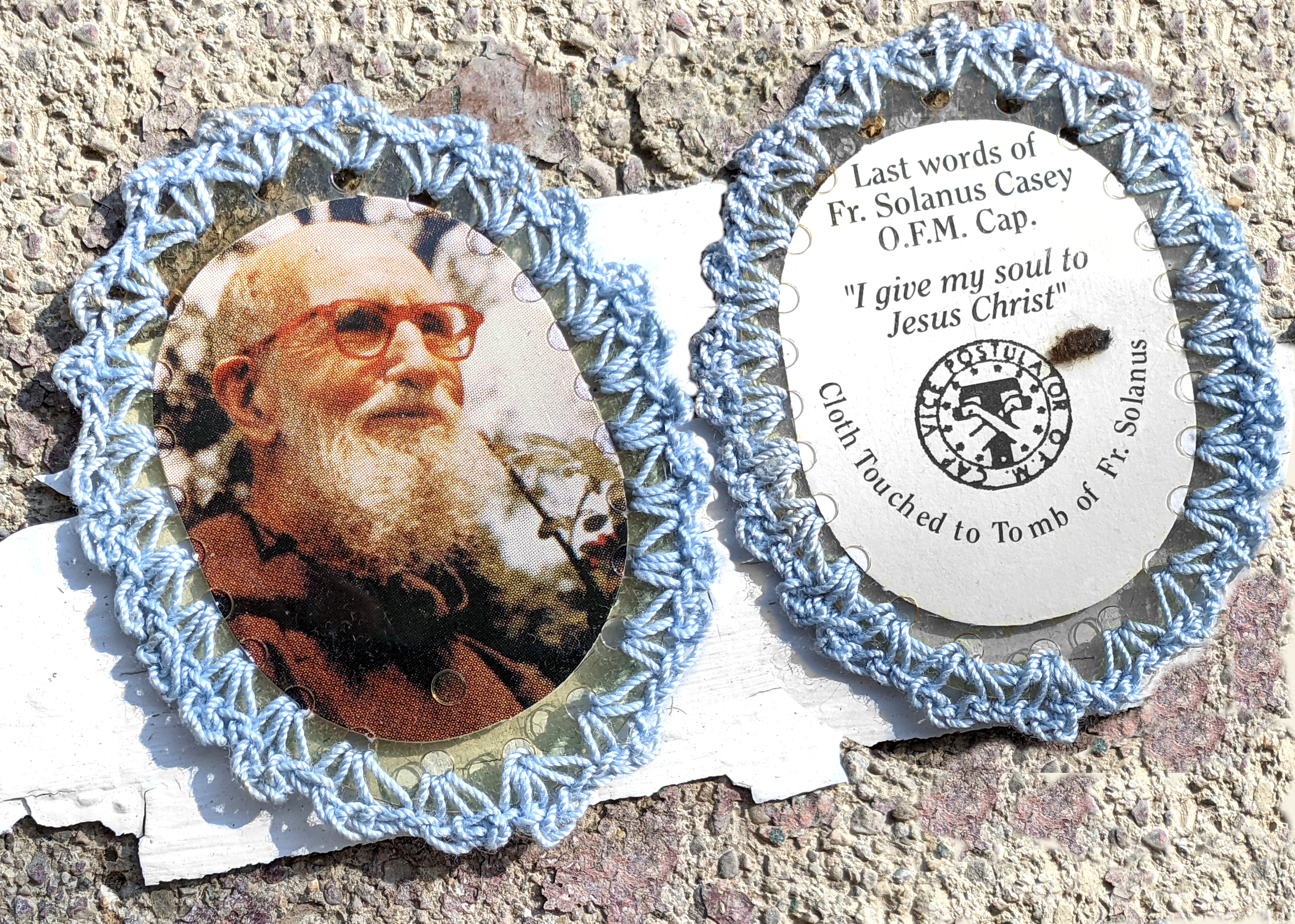
Relic scapular containing a piece of brown cloth touched to Casey's casket

For Casey to be beatified, the Congregation had to prove that an incident connected to Casey was a miracle, without any scientific explanation. The archdiocese examined numerous cases, submitting only one to the Congregation for verification in 1998; it was later rejected.

In September 2012, Paula Medina Zarate, a Panamanian visiting Detroit, walked into the Solanus Casey Center. Unfamiliar with Casey, she asked why people were gathered around his tomb. Told that he had been a healer, Medina Zarate knelt at the tomb and prayed for the health of the people in her village. She herself was suffering from ichthyosis vulgaris, a severe skin disease that restricted her mobility. She immediately felt a rush of heat and her skin started clearing up overnight.

The archdiocese investigated the Medina Zarate miracle and sent a report to the Congregation in 2015. It was validated in October 2015; approval by a panel of medical experts in September 2016, and approved by the theological consulters' approval in January 2017. The Congregation gave its final approval to the Medina Zarate miracle on May 2, 2017, and Pope Francis approved it on May 4.

On November 18, 2017, the Casey beatification was celebrated at Ford Field in Detroit in front of 70,000 onlookers. The mass and beatification rite were led by Cardinal Angelo Amato, the prefect for the Congregation.

== Legacy ==
- Bl. Solanus Casey Hall, a residence hall at Franciscan University of Steubenville
- Father Solanus Guild, Monastery Church of the Sacred Heart, Yonkers
- Fr. Solanus Hall at St. Lawrence Seminary High School, at Mount Calvary, Wisconsin.
- Fr. Solanus Kitchen, Our Lady Queen of Angels Convent, East Harlem, New York
- Solanus Casey Center for Youth and Families, Brooklyn, New York
- Solanus Casey Center in Detroit, run by the Capuchin Friars of Detroit, houses a museum adjacent to St. Bonaventure Monastery
- Solanus Casey Center in Seattle, Washington, a resource center for the poor and homeless run by Catholic Community Services of Western Washington
