= Conspiracy against rights =

United States federal crime

Conspiracy against rights is a federal offense in the United States of America under 18 U.S.C. § 241:

If two or more persons conspire to injure, oppress, threaten, or intimidate any person [...] in the free exercise or enjoyment of any right or privilege secured to him by the Constitution or laws of the United States, or because of his having so exercised the same;...

They shall be fined under this title or imprisoned not more than ten years, or both; and if death results from the acts committed in violation of this section or if such acts include kidnapping or an attempt to kidnap, aggravated sexual abuse or an attempt to commit aggravated sexual abuse, or an attempt to kill, they shall be fined under this title or imprisoned for any term of years or for life, or both, or may be sentenced to death.

== History ==
The law was originally enacted, with slightly different phrasing, in Section 6 of the Enforcement Act of 1870. The statutory text was revised in 1909 and in 1948, when it became Section 241 of Title 18 of the U.S. Code. Conspiracy against rights was initially invoked against vigilante groups like the Ku Klux Klan that acted to prevent recently-emancipated Black Southerners from exercising their rights granted by the Reconstruction Amendments in the aftermath of the American Civil War. The legislative intent of the statute was aimed towards election offenses which interfered with the exercise of the Fourteenth and Fifteenth Amendments. As the law does not define new rights nor does it elaborate on the range of relevant rights or privileges, courts have generally interpreted that the attempted deprivation of a broad range of rights falls under the scope of the statute. The Supreme Court would later note in United States v. Price (1966) that it was "hardly conceivable that Congress intended §241 to apply only to a narrow and relatively unimportant category of rights."

Convictions under §241 require that the government demonstrates that the defendant conspired to violate a constitutionally or federally protected right. The statute does not explicitly establish a requirement that defendants acted willfully under color of law, but courts have incorporated these elements in their interpretation of the law. A charge of conspiracy against rights does not require that the conspiracy is successful in accomplishing its goals, nor does it require execution of an overt act unlike other conspiracy-related statutes. Section §241 violations are charged as felonies with the possibility of fines up to $10,000 or imprisonment for up to ten years, including in circumstances where execution of an overt act would only be charged as a misdemeanor. The statute also allows for harsher penalties (including life imprisonment or the death penalty) if the conspiracy either attempts to cause or results in death, kidnapping, or aggravated sexual abuse. Charges of conspiracy against rights were formerly shaped by the statute's legislative intent and limited via Supreme Court decisions, such as in U.S. v. Cruikshank (1876). The Supreme Court determined in Cruikshank that the rights covered by the statute did not include those arising from natural law. In the decades following, the court would vary on the issue of the scope of conspiracy against rights. The court would eventually rule in Price that §241 safeguarded rights both explicit and implicit in the Constitution. Use of the statute expanded in the 20th century, and §241 is now a key component of civil rights enforcement and has been used in prosecutions of law enforcement misconduct, hate crimes, and witness tampering, as well as in prosecutions of human trafficking prior to the adoption of human trafficking conspiracy statutes.

The law has long been invoked in federal prosecutions of federal elections offenses, concerning abrogation of the right to vote, but has been more recently applied to state or local elections with federal components, as well as by some courts in elections solely at the state or local level. While the Supreme Court has held that the right to vote in state and local elections is constitutionally protected, it has not explicitly ruled on the applicability of §241 to such elections. Charges of conspiracy against rights concerning federal election offenses cover activities subverting the integrity of federal elections and do not require direct action towards an individual voter. Election conspiracies prosecuted under conspiracy against rights can be classified as either public schemes (where public officials commit a §241 violation under color of law) or private schemes (where conspirators impinge on the ability for voters to vote). While charges under the statute can be brought forth for any public scheme, federal prosecution of private schemes require that the conspiracy was targeted at a specific federal contest or affected such a contest. Federal prosecutors have brought the charge of conspiracy against rights in cases involving ballot stuffing, disfranchisement, the destruction of ballots, voter fraud, and interference of the accurate counting of votes.

A 2018 report by the United States–China Economic and Security Review Commission referred to the Chinese government's attempts to suppress overseas protests and acts of expression critical of the Chinese Communist Party as a conspiracy against rights.

== Common law intent requirement ==
In Screws v. United States (1945), the Supreme Court held that a conviction under a related statute, 18 U.S.C. §242, required proof of the defendant's specific intent to deprive the victim of a constitutional right. In United States v. Guest (1966), the Supreme Court read this same requirement into §241, the conspiracy statute.

== See also ==
- Transnational repression
