= Jefferson Houses =

Public housing development in Manhattan, New York

- NYCHA Property
- Thomas Jefferson Houses
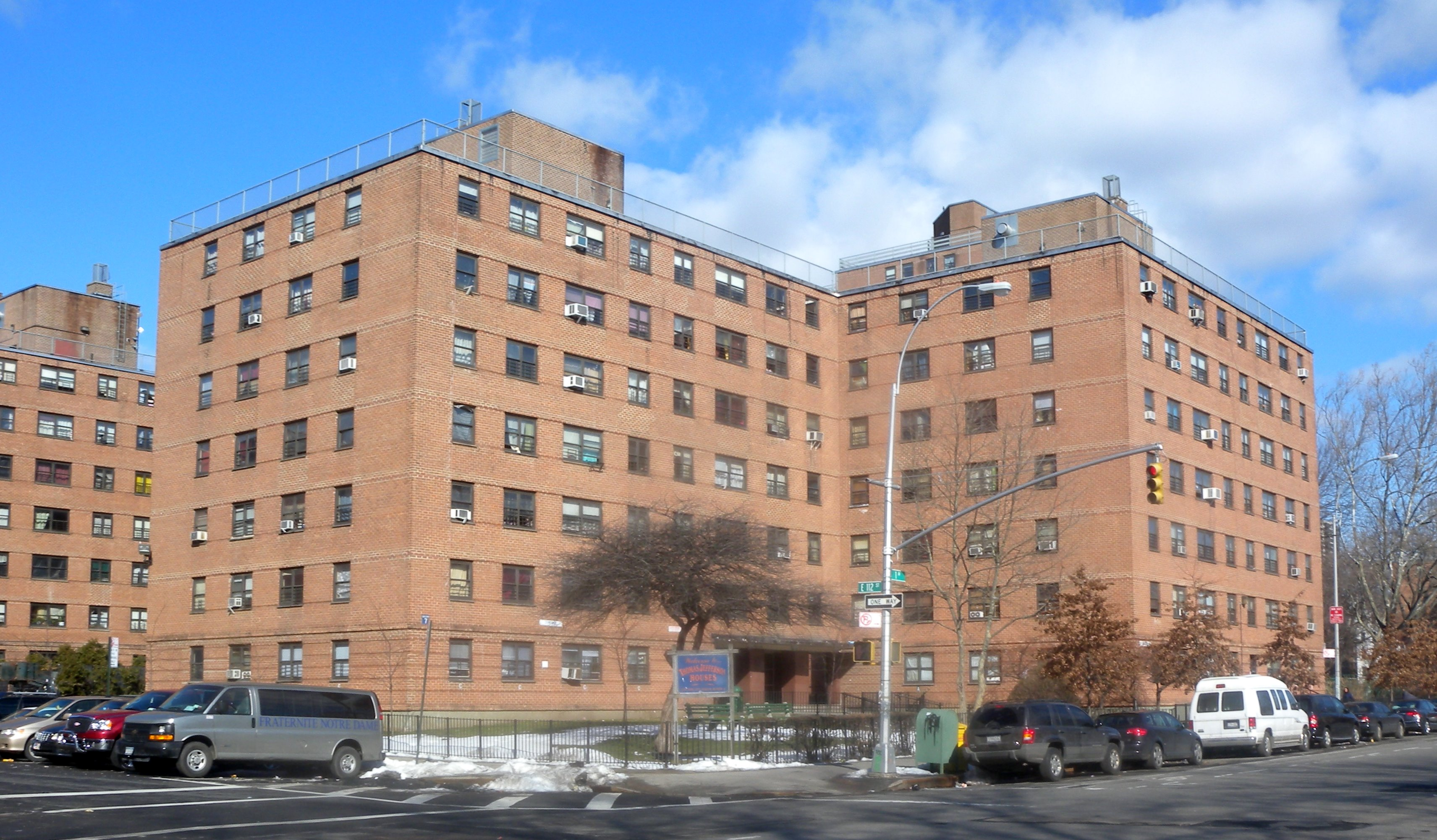
- Interactive map of Jefferson Houses
- Coordinates: 40.7953°N 73.9385°W
- Country: United States
- State: New York
- City: New York City
- Borough: Manhattan

Area
  - Total: 17.42 acres (7.05 ha)

Population
  - Total: 2,932
- Zip Code: 10029

The Jefferson Houses is a NYCHA Housing Complex that has 18 buildings. Buildings I, II, IX-XI, XIII, and XV-XVII have 14 stories; Buildings III, IV, VII, VIII, XII, XIV, and XVIII have 7 stories; and Buildings V and VI have 13 stories. They are located between 1st to 3rd Avenues, and also between 112th to 115th Streets in the East Harlem, Manhattan. It has around 2900 residents here so far as of 2025. This complex was named after the 3rd President of United States Thomas Jefferson.

== History ==
Plans for the project were prepared by the architectural firm of Brown & Guenther and filed with the Department of Housing and Building in August 1951. This housing complex was completed in August 1959.

In 1960, the Gala East Harlem Plaza opened at the housing complex, which was a plaza designed by the architect Albert Mayer that included a bandstand, fountain, picnic areas, playground, wading pool, seating, and metal umbrellas. Five years later, Mayer proposed creating a pedestrian promenade between La Marqueta and Thomas Jefferson Park, which would run through the Johnson Houses and the Jefferson Houses.

=== 21st century ===
In April 2025, residents in here are advancing climate education by the creation of the Little Green Book, it is an action guide about climate specifically for its residents. This guide will have printed copies and shared across here.

== See also ==
- New York City Housing Authority
