= List of cases of the January 6 United States Capitol attack (M-S) =

On January 6, 2021, thousands of Trump supporters participated in the U.S. Capitol attack, disrupting the joint session of Congress assembled to count electoral votes to formalize Joe Biden's victory in the 2020 United States presidential election.

By the end of the year, 725 people had been charged with federal crimes. That number rose to 1,000 by the second anniversary of the attack, to 1,200 by the third anniversary (three-quarters of whom had by then been found guilty) and to 1,500 before the fourth anniversary. As of January 20, 2025, 1,575 people had been charged in connection with the January 6 attack, of whom 1,021 had pleaded guilty and 249 had been convicted at trial.

Upon Donald Trump's inauguration on January 20, 2025, he pardoned all but 14 of those people. The remaining 14 people, though their convictions stood, were eligible for immediate release from prison, as he commuted their sentences to "time served". Following Trump's pardons, the United States Department of Justice (DOJ) moved to dismiss some cases awaiting trial or sentencing. In April 2026, DOJ prosecutors filed a request to vacate the felony convictions for four Proud Boys who had received commutations rather than pardons, and indicated an intention to make similar requests for other January 6 defendants who had received commutations.

After the pardon, some January 6 defendants and their survivors moved to sue the Department of Justice and federal law enforcement agencies. Most notably, the Department of Justice agreed to pay the family of Ashli Babbitt, who was fatally shot in the Capitol assault, $5 million in a lawsuit settlement. Other January 6 defendants have gone to court to have their sentencing fines refunded, or to file claims against the U.S. Department of Justice and other federal law enforcement agencies for injuries or property damage. In March 2026, some January 6 defendants and others present at the protest that day filed a class action lawsuit against the U.S. federal government, alleging that the U.S. Capitol Police and the Washington, D.C. Metropolitan Police Department caused the plaintiffs physical and emotional injuries while defending the Capitol.

In May 2026, a new "Anti-Weaponization Fund" was announced, setting aside $1.776 billion of public funds to distribute to Trump allies who claimed to be victims of federal "weaponization and lawfare". This was described as part of a settlement to end Trump's lawsuit against the Internal Revenue Service. Facing pushback, however, the DOJ said it would not pursue the fund. A judge has demanded proof. Another judge sanctioned the attorneys.

Days after the fund was announced, the Department of Justice acknowledged it was removing news releases from its websites that had documented criminal charges, convictions and sentencings of January 6 rioters. It described these prosecutions as "the DOJ’s weaponization under the Biden administration" and the news releases about them as "partisan propaganda". Lawfare Media published the deleted Department of Justice press releases in a database; as of June 9, 2026, it contained over 5,700 restored documents. Thomas Joscelyn, a principal author of the final report from the United States House Select Committee on the January 6 Attack, has also published a set of Department of Justice news releases and court filings relating to the attack.

== Previous sources of information ==
A list of "breach" cases, meaning cases in which the defendant was alleged to have entered a restricted area of the Capitol during the riot, was kept updated by the US Attorney's Office, District of Columbia. It was available until the morning of January 24, 2025, four days after President Trump had issued a blanket pardon, but later in the day, it said "Page not found". CNN reported its erasure the next day. Soon afterwards, some of the video evidence that had been part of court cases related to the prosecutions disappeared from a government server. A coalition of press organizations went to court over the missing evidence, and a judge subsequently ordered the government to stop removing the materials.

NPR has a database of all 1,575 cases in the Capitol attack prior to Trump's pardons, searchable by U.S. state, charges, and case status.

For plea deals entered between April–October 2021, BuzzFeed has a searchable table. After Trump's mass pardon in 2025, the Democratic Secretary of States Association launched a website to track the Capitol attackers' ongoing legal issues. Lawfare Media released a study on January 6 clemency recipients who were subsequently arrested or convicted of other crimes since the attack, finding 97 such cases as of June 4, 2026.

== Index ==
- List of cases of the January 6 United States Capitol attack (A-F)
- List of cases of the January 6 United States Capitol attack (G-L)
- List of cases of the January 6 United States Capitol attack (M-S)
- List of cases of the January 6 United States Capitol attack (T-Z)

== Table ==
Arrest date	Name	Charges	Pleas	Judgment	Notes
December 01, 2021	Danean Kimberly MacAndrew	Federal: Entering ... in a Restricted Building or Grounds; Disorderly ... in a Restricted Building or Grounds; Disorderly Conduct in a Capitol Building; Parading ... in a Capitol Building	MacAndrew pleaded Not Guilty to all charges. A Bench trial verdict on 1/17/2023 found MacAndrew Guilty on all charges.	Sentenced on 8/8/2023 to 3 months incarceration; 24 months supervised release; $70 special assessment; $500 restitution.	MacAndrew received a full pardon on January 20, 2025
January 11, 2024	Ian Richard MacBride	Federal: Obstruction of an Official Proceeding; Theft of Government Property; Entering ... in a Restricted Building or Grounds; Disorderly ... in a Restricted Building or Grounds; Disorderly Conduct in a Capitol Building; Parading ... in a Capitol Building	MacBride pleaded Not Guilty to all charges.	Jury trial set for 4/4/2025. On 1/21/2025, the court grants the government's motion to dismiss the case with prejudice	
December 11, 2021	Avery Carter MacCracken	Federal: Civil Disorder; Inflicting Bodily Injury on Certain Officers; Assaulting ... Certain Officers; Entering ... in a Restricted Building or Grounds; Disorderly ... in a Restricted Building or Grounds; Engaging in Physical Violence in a Restricted Building or Grounds; Act of Physical Violence on Capitol Grounds	MacCracken pleaded Guilty to one charge: Civil Disorder. The other charges are dismissed.	Sentenced on 5/16/2024 to 1 year and 1 day incarceration with credit for time served; 36 months of Supervised Release; $100 Special Assessment; Restitution in the amount of $2,000; 240 hours of community service.	MacCracken received a full pardon on January 20, 2025
December 19, 2022	Brennen Cline Machacek	Federal: Parading ... in any of the Capitol Buildings	Machacek pleaded Guilty to the charge.	Sentenced on 9/7/2023 to 12 months probation; $10 special assessment; $500 restitution; 30 hours of community service.	Machacek received a full pardon on January 20, 2025
February 13, 2024	Brandon Mackie	Federal: Entering ... in a Restricted Building or Grounds; Disorderly ... in a Restricted Building or Grounds; Disorderly Conduct in a Capitol Building; Parading ... in a Capitol Building	Mackie pleaded Guilty to two charges: Disorderly Conduct in a Capitol Building; Parading ... in a Capitol Building.	On 1/21/2025, the court grants the government's Motion to Dismiss the Indictment with prejudice.	
February 13, 2024	Nathan Mackie	Federal: Entering ... in a Restricted Building or Grounds; Disorderly ... in a Restricted Building or Grounds; Disorderly Conduct in a Capitol Building; Parading ... in a Capitol Building	Mackie pleaded Guilty to two charges: Disorderly Conduct in a Capitol Building; Parading ... in a Capitol Building.	On 1/21/2025, the court grants the government's Motion to Dismiss the Indictment with prejudice.	
March 17, 2021	Clifford Mackrell	Federal: Civil Disorder; Assaulting ... Certain Officers; Entering ... in a Restricted Building or Grounds; Disorderly ... in a Restricted Building or Grounds; Engaging in Physical Violence in a Restricted Building or Grounds; Act of Physical Violence in the Capitol Grounds or Buildings	Mackrell pleaded Guilty to one charge: Assaulting ... Certain Officers. The other charges are dismissed.	Sentenced on 3/5/2024 to 27 months incarceration; 24 months of supervised release; $2,000 restitution; $100 special assessment.	Mackrell received a full pardon on January 20, 2025
March 09, 2023	Michael Mackrell	Federal: Civil Disorder; Assaulting ... Certain Officers (5 counts); Entering ... in a Restricted Building or Grounds; Disorderly ... in a Restricted Building or Grounds; Engaging in Physical Violence in a Restricted Building or Grounds; Act of Physical Violence in the Capitol Grounds or Buildings	Mackrell pleaded Guilty to one charge: Assaulting ... Certain Officers. The other charges are dismissed.	Sentenced on 3/18/2024 to 27 months incarceration; 12 months of supervised release; $2,000 in restitution; $100 special assessment.	Mackrell received a full pardon on January 20, 2025
May 16, 2022	Douglas F. Macrae	Federal: Entering ... in a Restricted Building or Grounds; Disorderly ... in a Restricted Building or Grounds; Disorderly Conduct on Capitol Grounds; Parading ... in any of the Capitol Buildings	Macrae pleaded Guilty to one charge: Parading ... in any of the Capitol Buildings. The other charges are dismissed.	Sentenced on 10/21/2022 to 12 months Probation, a $10 Special Assessment, and $500 in Restitution; 50 hours community service.	Macrae received a full pardon on January 20, 2025
January 21, 2021	Dominick Madden	Federal: Entering ... in a Restricted Building; Disorderly ... in a Restricted Building; Violent Entry and Disorderly Conduct in a Capitol Building; Parading ... in a Capitol Building	Madden pleaded Guilty to one charge: Parading ... in a Capitol Building. The other charges are dismissed.	Sentenced on 1/11/2024 to 20 days incarceration; $10 special assessment; $500 restitution.	Madden received a full pardon on January 20, 2025
September 30, 2024	Christopher Sean Madison	Federal: Entering ... in a Restricted Building or Grounds; Disorderly ... in a Restricted Building or Grounds; Entering ... in Certain Rooms in the Capitol Building; Disorderly Conduct in a Capitol Building or Grounds; Parading ... in a Capitol Building	Madison pleaded Guilty to two charges: Disorderly Conduct in a Capitol Building or Grounds; Parading ... in a Capitol Building.	Sentencing set for 6/13/2025. On 1/23/2025, the court grants the government's motion to dismiss the case with prejudice	
November 09, 2023	Shawn Daniel Mahoney	Federal: Entering ... in a Restricted Building or Grounds; Disorderly ... in a Restricted Building or Grounds; Disorderly Conduct in a Capitol Building; Parading ... in a Capitol Building	Mahoney pleaded Guilty to two charges: Disorderly Conduct in a Capitol Building; Parading ... in a Capitol Building. The other charges are dismissed.	Sentenced on 10/23/2024 to 24 Months of Probation; 45 Days of Home Detention; 60 hours of community service; Special Assessment of $20; Restitution of $500.	Mahoney received a full pardon on January 20, 2025
March 19, 2021	Debra J. Maimone	Federal: Theft of Property—$1,000 or Less; Entering ... in a Restricted Building; Disorderly ... in a Restricted Building; Violent Entry and Disorderly Conduct in a Capitol Building; Parading ... in a Capitol Building	Maimone pleaded Guilty to one charge: Theft of Property. The other charges are dismissed.	Sentenced on 8/25/2023 to 2 years probation; $1,806 Restitution; $25 Special Assessment; 100 hours of community service; 120 days of location monitoring.	Maimone received a full pardon on January 20, 2025
February 10, 2021	Steve Omar Maldonado	Federal: Obstruction of an Official Proceeding; Entering ... in a Restricted Building or Grounds; Disorderly ... in a Restricted Building or Grounds; Entering ... in the Gallery of Congress; Disorderly Conduct in a Capitol Building; Parading ... in a Capitol Building	Maldonado pleaded Not Guilty to all charges.	On 1/21/2025, the court grants the government's motion to dismiss the case with prejudice.	
May 08, 2024	Peter Malone	Federal: Disorderly Conduct in a Capitol Building; Parading ... in a Capitol Building	Malone pleaded Guilty to both charges.	Sentencing is set for 4/25/2025. On 1/22/2025, the court grants the government's motion to dismiss the case with prejudice	
January 26, 2022	Markus Maly	Federal: Civil Disorder; Assaulting ... Certain Officers Using a Dangerous Weapon (2 counts); Entering ... in a Restricted Building or Grounds with a Deadly or Dangerous Weapon; Disorderly ... in a Restricted Building or Grounds with a Deadly or Dangerous Weapon; Engaging in Physical Violence in a Restricted Building or Grounds with a Deadly or Dangerous Weapon; Disorderly Conduct in a Capitol Building; Act of Physical Violence in the Capitol Grounds or Buildings	Maly pleaded Not Guilty to all charges. On 12/6/2022 he was convicted in a jury trial on all charges.	Sentenced on 6/9/2023 to 72 months incarceration; 36 months supervised release; $620 special assessment.	Maly received a full pardon on January 20, 2025
January 31, 2024	Giorgi Mamulashvili	Federal: Entering or Remaining in a Restricted Building or Grounds; Disorderly ... in a Restricted Building or Grounds; Disorderly Conduct in a Capitol Building; Parading ... in a Capitol Building	Mamulashvili pleaded Guilty to two charges: Disorderly Conduct in a Capitol Building or Grounds; Parading ... in a Capitol Building. The other charges are dismissed.	Sentenced on 8/29/2024 to 12 months of Probation; Special Assessment of $20; Restitution of $500; 60 hours of community service.	Mamulashvili received a full pardon on January 20, 2025
August 28, 2024	Adam Christopher Mancuso	Federal: Entering ... in a Restricted Building or Grounds; Disorderly ... in a Capitol Building or Grounds; Disorderly Conduct in a Capitol Building; Parading ... in a Capitol Building	Mancuso pleaded Not Guilty to all charges.	On 2/10/2025, the court ordered that the case is dismissed without prejudice.	
April 26, 2023	Jeanette Mangia	Federal: Obstruction of an Official Proceeding; Civil Disorder; Assaulting, Resisting. or Impeding Certain Officers; Entering ... in a Restricted Building or Grounds; Disorderly ... in a Restricted Building or Grounds; Engaging in Physical Violence in a Restricted Building or Grounds; Entering ... on the Floor of Congress; Entering ... in Certain Rooms in the Capitol Building; Disorderly Conduct in a Capitol Building; Act of Physical Violence in the Capitol Grounds or Buildings; Parading. Demonstrating. or Picketing in a Capitol Building	Mangia pleaded Not Guilty to all charges. Failed to appear at Status Hearing on 6/28/2024 and Bench Warrant Has Been Issued. Arrested on 7/23/2024.	On 1/22/2025, the court ordered that the case is dismissed without prejudice.	
October 15, 2021	Christian Matthew Manley	Federal: Civil Disorder; Assaulting ... Certain Officers; Assaulting ... Certain Officers using a Dangerous Weapon; Entering ... in a Restricted Building or Grounds with a Deadly or Dangerous Weapon; Disorderly ... in a Restricted Building or Grounds with a Deadly or Dangerous Weapon; Engaging in Physical Violence in a Restricted Building or Grounds with a Deadly or Dangerous Weapon; Disorderly Conduct in a Capitol Building; Act of Physical Violence in a Capitol Building or Grounds	Manley pleaded Guilty to one charge: Assaulting ... Certain Officers using a Dangerous Weapon. The other charges are dismissed.	Sentenced on 4/25/2023 to 50 months of incarceration; 36 months of Supervised Release; Special Assessment of $100; Restitution of $2,000.	Manley received a full pardon on January 20, 2025
August 10, 2022	Landon Manwaring	Federal: Parading ... in a Capitol Building	Manwaring pleaded Guilty to the charge.	Sentenced 11/28/2022 to 30 days of Incarceration;35 Months of Probation; Restitution of $500 and Special Assessment of $10.	Manwaring received a full pardon on January 20, 2025
September 13, 2022	Susan Manwaring	Federal: Parading ... in a Capitol Building	Manwaring pleaded Guilty to the single charge.	Sentenced on 2/14/2023 to 36 Months of Probation (with conditions) with the first 30 days served on home detention; Restitution of $500; Special Assessment of $10; Fine of $500.	Manwaring received a full pardon on January 20, 2025
August 02, 2023	Mario Mares	Federal: Entering ... in a Restricted Building or Grounds with a Deadly or Dangerous Weapon; Disorderly ... in a Restricted Building or Grounds; Unlawful Possession of a Firearm on Capitol Grounds or Buildings; Disorderly Conduct in a Capitol Building	Mares pleaded Not Guilty to all charges. Bench trial verdict on 10/31/2024 found him Guilty on all charges.	Sentencing set for 2/27/2025. On 3/4/2025, the court grants the government's motion to dismiss the case with prejudice.	
January 22, 2021	Anthony R. Mariotto	Federal: Entering ... in a Restricted Building or Grounds; Disorderly ... in a Restricted Building or Grounds; Entering ... in the Gallery of Congress; Disorderly Conduct in a Capitol Building; Parading ... in a Capitol Building	Mariotto pleaded Guilty to one charge: Parading ... in a Capitol Building. The other charges are dismissed.	Sentenced 12/17/2021 to 3 years probation; $5,000 fine; $500 restitution; $10 special assessment; 250 hours community service.	Mariotto received a full pardon on January 20, 2025
July 17, 2023	Richard Markey	Federal: Civil Disorder; Assaulting ... Certain Officers; Assaulting ... Certain Officers Using a Dangerous Weapon; Entering ... in a Restricted Building or Grounds with a Deadly or Dangerous Weapon; Disorderly ... in a Restricted Building or Grounds with a Deadly or Dangerous Weapon; Engaging in Physical Violence in a Restricted Building or Grounds with a Deadly or Dangerous Weapon; Disorderly Conduct in a Capitol Building; Act of Physical Violence in the Capitol Grounds or Buildings	Markey pleaded Guilty to one charge: Assaulting ... Certain Officers Using a Dangerous Weapon. The other charges are dismissed.	Sentenced on 12/6/2024 to 30 months incarceration; 36 months of supervised release; $2,000 in restitution; $100 special assessment.	Markey received a full pardon on January 20, 2025
May 03, 2021	Abram Markofski	Federal: Entering ... in a Restricted Building or Grounds; Disorderly ... in a Restricted Building or Grounds; Violent Entry or Disorderly Conduct; Parading ... in a Capitol Building	Markofski pleaded Guilty to one charge: Parading ... in a Capitol Building. The other charges were dismissed.	Sentenced 12/10/2021 to 24 months of Probation; $500 in restitution; a fine in the amount of $1,000; a special assessment of $10; 50 hours of community service.	Markofski received a full pardon on January 20, 2025
January 15, 2021	Felipe Marquez	Federal: Obstruction of an Official Proceeding; Entering ... in a Restricted Building or Grounds; Disorderly ... in a Restricted Building or Grounds; Entering ... in Certain Rooms in the Capitol Building; Disorderly Conduct in a Capitol Building	Marquez pleaded Guilty to one charge: Disorderly or Disruptive Conduct in a Restricted Building or Grounds. The other charges are dismissed.	Sentenced 12/10/2021 to 18 months Probation with conditions; $25 special assessment; imposition of a fine waived; restitution in the amount of $500.	Marquez received a full pardon on January 20, 2025
July 27, 2023	Michael Marroquin	Federal: Obstruction of an Official Proceeding; Entering ... in a Restricted Building or Grounds; Disorderly ... in a Restricted Building or Grounds; Entering ... on the Floor of Congress; Disorderly Conduct in a Capitol Building; Parading ... in any of the Capitol Buildings	Marroquin pleaded Guilty to five charges (not Obstruction).	Sentenced on 12/9/2024 to 6 months of incarceration; 1 year of Supervised Release; Special Assessment of $80; Restitution in the amount of $500.	Marroquin received a full pardon on January 20, 2025
May 01, 2024	David A. Marshall, Jr.	Federal: Civil Disorder; Assaulting ... Certain Officers; Assault within the Maritime and Territorial Jurisdiction of the United States; Entering ... in a Restricted Building or Grounds; Disorderly ... in a Restricted Building or Grounds; Engaging in Physical Violence in a Restricted Building or Grounds; Disorderly Conduct in a Capitol Building; Act of Physical Violence in the Capitol Grounds or Buildings; Parading ... in a Capitol Building		On 1/22/2025, the court grants the government's motion to dismiss the case with prejudice	
October 09, 2024	Rebecca Irene Marshburn	Federal: Civil Disorder; Entering ... in a Restricted Building or Grounds; Disorderly ... in a Restricted Building or Grounds; Engaging in Physical Violence in a Restricted Building or Grounds; Disorderly Conduct in a Capitol Building; Parading ... in the Capitol Buildings	Marshburn pleaded Not Guilty to all charges.	On 1/22/2025, the court grants the government's motion to dismiss the case with prejudice.	
September 02, 2021	Benjamin J. Martin	Federal: Civil Disorder; Obstruction of an Official Proceeding; Entering ... in a Restricted Building or Grounds; Disorderly ... in a Restricted Building or Grounds; Disorderly Conduct in a Capitol Building; Parading ... in a Capitol Building	Martin pleaded Not Guilty to all charges. Found Guilty on all charges in a Jury trial on 6/26/2024. On 10/15/2024, the court dismissed the Obstruction charge.	Sentenced on 12/20/2024 to 13 Months of incarceration; Supervised Release: 36 Months; Special Assessment: $170; Restitution: $2,000.	Martin's prior criminal history includes pleading guilty to obstruction of a public officer in 2003, a 2016 battery charge where he repeatedly struck his 14-year-old daughter, and a 2018 battery charge where Martin choked his girlfriend and dragged her back into the house after she tried to flee," according to Jan. 6 prosecutors. Due to his criminal record, Martin was prohibited from owning guns. When FBI agents arrested Martin in connection with his Jan. 6 case, they found "eight firearms, including an AR‑15‑style rifle, multiple high-capacity magazines for the AR-15, and more than 500 rounds of ammunition." Martin alleged that the firearms belonged to his family members. He was separately tried and convicted in California of "Possession of Firearm and Ammunition by Person with Conviction for Misdemeanor Crime of Domestic Violence," a felony, for which he was sentenced to more than three years in prison. After President Trump granted Martin clemency for his Jan. 6 conviction, Martin subsequently turned himself in to authorities on the gun conviction. Martin received a full pardon on January 20, 2025.
June 21, 2023	Dustin Martin	Federal: Obstruction of an Official Proceeding; Civil Disorder; Entering ... in a Restricted Building or Grounds; Disorderly ... in a Restricted Building or Grounds; Disorderly Conduct in a Capitol Building or Grounds; Parading ... in a Capitol Building	Martin pleaded Guilty to two charges: Civil Disorder and Disorderly ... in a Restricted Building or Grounds. Oral Motion by the government to dismiss Counts 1,3,5, and 6, heard and granted.	Sentencing set for 2/7/2025. On 1/27/2025, the court grants the government's motion to dismiss the case with prejudice	
July 31, 2023	Marcus Clint Martin	Federal: Civil Disorder; Assaulting ... Certain Officers (4 counts); Entering ... in a Restricted Building or Grounds; Disorderly ... in a Restricted Building or Grounds; Engaging in Physical Violence in a Restricted Building or Grounds; Disorderly Conduct in a Capitol Building; Act of Physical Violence in the Capitol Grounds or Buildings	Martin pleaded Guilty to two counts of Assaulting ... Certain Officers. The other charges are dismissed.	Sentenced on 7/19/2024 to 32 months incarceration; 24 months of Supervised Release; Special Assessment of $200; Restitution of $2,000; 60 hours of community service.	Martin received a full pardon on January 20, 2025
April 22, 2021	Matthew Martin	Federal: Entering ... in a Restricted Building; Disorderly ... in a Restricted Building; Violent Entry and Disorderly Conduct in a Capitol Building; Parading ... in a Capitol Building	Martin pleaded Not Guilty to all charges.	He was found Not Guilty of all charges on 4/6/2022 after a misdemeanor bench trial.	
January 28, 2021	Zachary Hayes Martin	Federal: Entering ... in a Restricted Building or Grounds; Disorderly ... in a Restricted Building or Grounds; Disorderly Conduct in a Capitol Building or Grounds; Parading ... in a Capitol Building	Martin pleaded Guilty to one charge: Parading ... in a Capitol Building. The other charges are dismissed.	Sentenced 3/17/2022 to 3 years probation; $500 restitution; $1,000 fine and $10 special assessment; 60 hours of community service.	Martin received a full pardon on January 20, 2025
June 10, 2021	Felipe Antonio Martinez	Federal: Conspiracy to Obstruct an Official Proceeding; Obstruction of an Official Proceeding and Aiding and Abetting; Entering ... in a Restricted Building and Grounds; Disorderly ... in a Restricted Building or Grounds	Martinez pleaded Not Guilty to all charges. Found Guilty in a Jury trial on 11/7/2023 on all charges.	Sentenced on 4/19/2024 to 21 months incarceration; 36 month term of supervised release; restitution in the amount of $2,000; special assessment of $250.	Martinez received a full pardon on January 20, 2025
January 24, 2023	Victor Anthony Martinez	Federal: Entering ... in a Restricted Building or Grounds; Disorderly ... in a Restricted Building or Grounds; Disorderly Conduct in a Capitol Building; Parading ... in a Capitol Building	Martinez pleaded Guilty to one charge: Parading ... in a Capitol Building. The other charges are dismissed.	Sentenced on 7/18/2023 to 14 days incarceration; 12 months of probation; $500 restitution; $10 special assessment.	Martinez received a full pardon on January 20, 2025
August 25, 2023	James Wayne Maryanski	Federal: Assaulting ... Certain Officers Using a Dangerous Weapon; Civil Disorder; Entering ... in a Restricted Building or Grounds; Disorderly ... in a Restricted Building or Grounds; Engaging in Physical Violence in a Restricted building or Grounds; Obstruct, or Impede Passage Through or Within, the Grounds or any of the Capitol Building; Act of Physical Violence in the Capitol Grounds or Buildings	Status Hearing continued to 1/14/2025.	On 1/22/2025, the court grants the government's motion to dismiss the case with prejudice	
November 30, 2023	Siaka Tonia Massaquoi	Federal: Entering ... in a Restricted Building or Grounds; Disorderly ... in a Restricted Building or Grounds; Disorderly Conduct in a Capitol Building or Grounds; Parading ... in a Capitol Building	Massaquoi pleaded Not Guilty to all charges. Jury Trial set for 1/21/2025.	On 1/21/2025, the court grants the government's motion to dismiss the case with prejudice	
February 08, 2022	Kenneth Duncan Massie	Federal: Entering ... in a Restricted Building or Grounds; Disorderly ... in a Restricted Building or Grounds; Disorderly Conduct in a Capitol Building; Parading ... in a Capitol Building	Massie pleaded Guilty to one charge: Parading ... in a Capitol Building. The other charges are dismissed.	Sentenced on 4/20/2023 to 24 Months Probation; 30 days location monitoring; 60 hours of community service; $500 Restitution; $10 Special Assessment.	Massie received a full pardon on January 20, 2025
August 23, 2023	Anthony Mastanduno	Federal: Civil Disorder; Assaulting ... Certain Officers Using a Dangerous Weapon (2 counts); Entering ... in a Restricted Building or Grounds with a Deadly or Dangerous Weapon; Disorderly ... in a Restricted Building or Grounds with a Deadly or Dangerous Weapon; Engaging in Physical Violence in a Restricted Building or Grounds with a Deadly or Dangerous Weapon; Disorderly Conduct in a Capitol Building; Act of Physical Violence in a Capitol Building or Grounds; Parading ... in a Capitol Building	Mastanduno pleaded Guilty to all charges.	Sentenced on 6/27/2024 to 57 Months incarceration; 24 months of Supervised Release; Special Assessment of $630; Restitution of $4,174.	Mastanduno received a full pardon on January 20, 2025
July 20, 2023	Israel Mark Matson	Federal: Parading ... in a Capitol Building	Matson pleaded Guilty to the charge.	Sentenced on 1/12/2024 to 12 months of Probation; 45 days location monitoring; $10 Special Assessment; Restitution of $500; 60 hours of community service.	Matson received a full pardon on January 20, 2025
October 07, 2021	Cody Mattice	Federal: Civil Disorder; Assaulting ... Certain Officers; Assaulting ... Certain Officers Using a Dangerous Weapon; Obstruction of an Official Proceeding and Aiding and Abetting; Entering ... in a Restricted Building or Grounds with a Deadly or Dangerous Weapon; Disorderly ... in a Restricted Building or Grounds with a Deadly or Dangerous Weapon; Engaging in Physical Violence in a Restricted Building or Grounds with a Deadly or Dangerous Weapon; Disorderly Conduct in a Capitol Building; Act of Physical Violence in the Capitol Grounds or Buildings	Mattice pleaded Guilty to one charge: Assaulting ... Certain Officers or Employees. The other charges are dismissed.	Sentenced 7/15/2022 to 44 months incarceration; 36 months of supervised release; $2,000 in restitution; $100 special assessment.	Mattice received a full pardon on January 20, 2025
April 25, 2024	Matthew Ryan Matulich	Federal: Theft of Government Property	Matulich pleaded Guilty to the charge.	Sentenced on 9/5/2024 to 90 days incarceration; 9 months of Supervised Release; $25 Special Assessment; Restitution of $500; 40 hours of community service.	Matulich received a full pardon on January 20, 2025
August 31, 2023	Ethan Mauck	Federal: Civil Disorder; Entering ... in a Restricted Building or Grounds; Disorderly ... in a Restricted Building or Grounds; Disorderly Conduct in a Capitol Building	Mauck pleaded Not Guilty to all charges. On 9/27/2024, he received a partial verdict of Not Guilty on Counts 2 and 3. On 10/29/2024, found Guilty on counts 1 and 4.	Sentencing set for 2/28/2025. On 2/24/2025, the court grants the government's motion to dismiss the case with prejudice.	
October 7, 2021	James Phillip Mault	Federal: Assaulting ... Certain Officers using a Dangerous Weapon or Inflicting Bodily Injury; Civil Disorder; Entering ... Restricted Building or Grounds with a Deadly or Dangerous Weapon; Disorderly ... Restricted Building or Grounds with a Deadly or Dangerous Weapon; Engaging in Physical Violence in a Restricted Building or Grounds with a Deadly or Dangerous Weapon; Disorderly Conduct in a Capitol Building; Act of Physical Violence in the Capitol Grounds or Buildings		Sentenced to 44 months in prison, three years of supervised release, $2,000 restitution.	Specialist; joined the Army in May 2021. Arrested at Fort Bragg and charged with multiple violent crimes. Accused of pepper-spraying law enforcement.
February 22, 2023	Christopher Maurer	Federal: Civil Disorder; Assaulting ... Certain Officers and Aiding and Abetting; Assaulting ... Certain Officers Using a Dangerous Weapon and Aiding and Abetting; Assaulting ... Certain Officers Using a Dangerous Weapon (2 counts); Entering ... in a Restricted Building or Grounds with a Deadly or Dangerous Weapon; Disorderly ... in a Restricted Building or Grounds with a Deadly or Dangerous Weapon; Engaging in Physical Violence in a Restricted Building or Grounds with a Deadly or Dangerous Weapon; Act of Physical Violence in the Capitol Grounds or Buildings	Maurer pleaded Guilty to one charge: Assaulting ... Certain Officers Using a Dangerous Weapon. The other charges are dismissed.	Sentenced on 11/18/2024 to 50 months incarceration; 24 months of supervised release; $2,000 in restitution; $100 special assessment.	Maurer received a full pardon on January 20, 2025
October 18, 2024	Cylester Maxwell	Federal: Obstruction of Law Enforcement During Civil Disorder; Assaulting ... Certain Officers with a Deadly or Dangerous Weapon; Entering ... in a Restricted Building or Grounds; Disorderly ... in a Restricted Building or Grounds; Engaging in Physical Violence in a Restricted Building or Grounds; Act of Physical Violence in a Restricted Building or Grounds		On 1/22/2025, the court grants the government's motion to dismiss the case with prejudice.	
February 10, 2022	Jake Maxwell	Federal: Civil Disorder; Assaulting ... Certain Officers (two counts); Entering ... in a Restricted Building or Grounds; Disorderly ... in a Restricted Building or Grounds; Engaging in Physical Violence in a Restricted Building or Grounds; Act of Physical Violence in the Capitol Grounds or Buildings	Maxwell pleaded Not Guilty to all charges. Bench Trial verdict on 11/14/2023 finds Maxwell Guilty on three counts: Civil Disorder, Entering ... in a Restricted Building or Grounds, Disorderly ... in a Restricted Building or Grounds; and Not Guilty on the other four counts.	Sentenced on 11/21/2024 to 18 months of probation; first 6 months of probation on home detention; special assessment of $150; $1,500 in Restitution.	Maxwell received a full pardon on January 20, 2025
November 17, 2021	Mark Andrew Mazza	Federal: Civil Disorder; Obstruction of an Official Proceeding and Aiding and Abetting; Obstruction of an Official Proceeding; Assaulting ... Certain Officers Using a Deadly or Dangerous Weapon; Entering ... in a Restricted Building or Grounds with a Deadly or Dangerous Weapon; Disorderly ... in a Restricted Building or Grounds with a Deadly or Dangerous Weapon; Engaging in Physical Violence in a Restricted Building with a Deadly or Dangerous Weapon; Unlawful Possession of a Firearm on Capitol Grounds or Buildings; Act of Physical Violence in the Capitol Grounds or Buildings; Carrying a Pistol Without a License (DC); Possession of Unregistered Firearm (DC); Unlawful Possession of Ammunition (DC); Second Degree Theft (DC)	Mazza pleaded Guilty to two charges: Counts 4, and 10 - Assaulting ... Certain Officers Using a Deadly or Dangerous Weapon; and Carrying a Pistol Without a License (D.C. Code). The other charges are dismissed.	Sentenced on 10/21/2022 to 5 years incarceration; 3 years supervised release; Special Assessment of $200; restitution of $2,150.	Mazza received a full pardon on January 20, 2025
April 04, 2022	Anthony Michael Mazzio Jr.	Federal: Parading ... in a Capitol Building	Mazzio pleaded Guilty to the single charge: Parading ... in a Capitol Building.	Sentenced on 10/5/2022 to 60 days incarceration; 3 years of probation; $500 restitution; $10 special assessment. Remanded to the District court for resentencing after appeal. Resentenced on 1/31/2024 to 46 months of Probation with credit for 34 months. Defendant has already paid the previously imposed $10 special assessment and $500 restitution payment.	Mazzio received a full pardon on January 20, 2025
January 17, 2021	Matthew Carl Mazzocco	Federal: Entering ... in a Restricted Building; Disorderly ... in a Restricted Building; Violent Entry and Disorderly Conduct in a Capitol Building; Parading ... in a Capitol Building	Mazzocco pleaded Guilty to one charge: Parading, Demonstrating, or Picketing in a Capitol Building.	The other charges were dismissed. He was sentenced 10/4/2021 to 45 days of incarceration; 60 hours of community service; $10 assessment fee; $500 restitution.	Mazzocco received a full pardon on January 20, 2025
August 17, 2021	Ronald Colton McAbee	Federal: Inflicting Bodily Injury on an Officer; Assaulting ... Certain Officers; Civil Disorder; Entering ... in a Restricted Building or Grounds with a Deadly or Dangerous Weapon; Disorderly ... in a Restricted Building or Grounds with a Deadly or Dangerous Weapon; Act of Physical Violence in the Capitol Grounds or Buildings	McAbee pleaded Not Guilty to all charges. Found Guilty in a Jury trial on five charges on 10/11/2023. On 9/25/2023, McAbee pleaded Guilty to two separate charges: Assaulting ... Certain Officers and Act of Physical Violence in the Capitol Grounds or Buildings.	Sentenced on 2/29/2024 to 70 months of incarceration, receives credit for time served since arrest on 8/17/2021; Supervised release of 36 months; Special Assessment: $610; Restitution: $32,165.65.	McAbee received a full pardon on January 20, 2025
July 20, 2021	Edward McAlanis	Federal: Entering ... in a Restricted Building; Disorderly ... in a Restricted Building; Violent Entry and Disorderly Conduct; Parading ... in a Capitol Building	McAlanis pleaded Guilty to one charge: Parading ... in a Capitol Building. The other charges are dismissed.	Sentenced 2/15/2022 to 2 years of probation; $500 in restitution; $10 special assessment; 60 hours community service.	McAlanis received a full pardon on January 20, 2025
January 29, 2024	Justin McAllister	Federal: Civil Disorder; Assaulting ... Certain Officers Using a Dangerous Weapon; Entering ... in a Restricted Building or Grounds; Disorderly ... in a Restricted Building or Grounds; Disorderly Conduct in the Capitol Grounds or Buildings; Parading ... in a Capitol Building	McAllister pleaded Not Guilty to all charges.	Jury trial set for 4/7/2025. On 1/22/2025, the court grants the government's motion to dismiss the case with prejudice	
January 28, 2021	Justin McAuliffe	Federal: Parading ... in a Capitol Building	McAuliffe pleaded Guilty to the single charge.	Sentenced 1/28/2022 to 3 years probation; 60 days home detention/location monitoring; $500 restitution; $10 special assessment.	McAuliffe received a full pardon on January 20, 2025
January 19, 2021	Patrick Edward McCaughey III	Federal: Assaulting ... Certain Officers and Aiding and Abetting (2 counts); Assaulting ... Certain Officers Using a Dangerous Weapon; Obstruction of an Official Proceeding and Aiding and Abetting; Civil Disorder; Disorderly ... in a Restricted Building or Grounds with a Deadly or Dangerous Weapon; Engaging in Physical Violence in a Restricted Building or Grounds with a Deadly or Dangerous Weapon; Disorderly Conduct in a Capitol Building; Act of Physical Violence in the Capitol Grounds or Buildings	McCaughey pleaded Not Guilty to all charges. Bench Trial was held 8/29/2022-9/7/2022. On 9/13/2022, McCaughey was found guilty of nine charges - seven felony charges and two misdemeanor charges.	Sentenced on 4/14/2023 to 90 Months of Incarceration; 24 Months of Supervised Release; Special Assessment of $720; Restitution of $2,000.	McCaughey was convicted of stealing a police shield and using it to crush U.S. Capitol Officer Daniel Hodges (police officer). McCaughey received a full pardon on January 20, 2025
December 05, 2024	Suzan McClain	Federal: Entering ... in a Restricted Building or Grounds; Disorderly ... in a Restricted Building or Grounds; Disorderly Conduct in a Capitol Building or Grounds; Parading ... in a Capitol Building		On 1/22/2025, the court grants the government's motion to dismiss the case with prejudice.	
November 18, 2021	Michael Gwynn McCormick	Federal: Entering ... in a Restricted Building or Grounds; Disorderly ... in a Restricted Building or Grounds; Disorderly Conduct in a Capitol Building; Parading ... in a Capitol Building	McCormick pleaded Guilty to one charge: Parading ... in a Capitol Building. The other charges are dismissed.	Sentenced on 12/20/2022 to 14 days of incarceration; $10 Special Assessment; Restitution of $500; Fine of $1,000.	McCormick received a full pardon on January 20, 2025
February 04, 2021	Brian P. McCreary	Federal: Obstruction of an Official Proceeding; Entering ... Restricted Building or Grounds; Disordelry and Disruptive Conduct in a Restricted Building or Grounds; Disordelry Conduct in a Capitol Building; Parading ... in a Capitol Building	Guilty – one charge: Entering ... Restricted Building or Grounds. The other charges are dismissed.	Sentenced to 36 months of probation, including 42 days of intermittent incarceration and two months of home detention, $2,500 fine, $500 restitution	McCreary received a full pardon on January 20, 2025.
June 11, 2021	Savannah Danielle McDonald	Federal: Entering ... in a Restricted Building; Disorderly ... in a Restricted Building; Violent Entry and Disorderly Conduct; Parading ... in a Capitol Building	McDonald pleaded Guilty to one charge: Parading ... in a Capitol Building. The other charges are dismissed.	Sentenced on 5/10/2022 to 21 days of incarceration; $10 Special Assessment; Restitution of $500.	McDonald received a full pardon on January 20, 2025
April 11, 2024	Darl McDorman	Federal: Civil Disorder; Assaulting ... Certain Officers; Assaulting ... Certain Officers Using a Dangerous Weapon (6 counts); Entering ... in a Restricted Building or Grounds with a Deadly or Dangerous Weapon; Disorderly ... in a Restricted Building or Grounds with a Deadly or Dangerous Weapon; Engaging in Physical Violence in a Restricted Building or Grounds with a Deadly or Dangerous Weapon; Disorderly Conduct in a Capitol Building; Act of Physical Violence in the Capitol Grounds or Buildings	McDorman pleaded Not Guilty to all charges.	On 1/21/2025, the court grants the government's motion to dismiss the case with prejudice	
May 08, 2024	Kathryn Diane McEvoy	Federal: Entering or Remaining in a Restricted Building or Grounds; Disorderly ... in a Restricted Building or Grounds; Disorderly Conduct in a Capitol Building; Parading, Picketing, or Demonstrating in a Capitol Building	McEvoy pleaded Guilty to two charges: Disorderly Conduct in a Capitol Building; Parading, Picketing, or Demonstrating in a Capitol Building.	Sentencing set for 2/11/2025. On 1/21/2025, the court grants the government's motion to dismiss the case with prejudice	
August 30, 2022	Tyrone McFadden, Jr.	Federal: Entering ... in a Restricted Building or Grounds; Disorderly ... in a Restricted Building or Grounds; Disorderly Conduct in a Capitol Building; Parading ... in a Capitol Building	McFadden pleaded Guilty to one charge: Parading ... in a Capitol Building. The other charges are dismissed.	Sentenced on 3/20/2023 to 24 Months Probation; 30 days location monitoring; 60 hours of community service; $500 Restitution and $10 Special Assessment .	McFadden received a full pardon on January 20, 2025
February 09, 2023	Brian Scott McGee	Federal: Entering ... in a Restricted Building or Grounds; Disorderly ... in a Restricted Building or Grounds; Disorderly Conduct in a Capitol Building or Grounds; Parading ... in a Capitol Building	McGee pleaded Guilty to one charge: Parading ... in a Capitol Building. The other charges are dismissed.	Sentenced on 11/8/2023 to 36 Months Probation; 7 days intermittent confinement; $10 Special Assessment; Restitution in the amount of $500; 60 hours of community service.	McGee received a full pardon on January 20, 2025
January 11, 2024	Jenna McGrath	Federal: Entering ... in a Restricted Building or Grounds; Disorderly ... in a Restricted Building or Grounds; Disorderly Conduct in a Capitol Building; Parading ... in a Capitol Building			On 1/22/2025, the court grants the government's motion to dismiss the case with prejudice.
January 24, 2024	Laura McGrath	Federal: Entering ... in a Restricted Building or Grounds; Disorderly ... in a Restricted Building or Grounds; Disorderly Conduct in a Capitol Building; Parading ... in a Capitol Building			On 1/22/2025, the court grants the government's motion to dismiss the case with prejudice.
May 28, 2021	James Burton McGrew	Federal: Civil Disorder; Obstruction of an Official Proceeding; Assaulting ... Certain Officers; Assaulting ... Certain Officers Using a Dangerous Weapon; Entering ... in a Restricted Building or Grounds with a Deadly or Dangerous Weapon; Disorderly ... in a Restricted Building or Grounds with a Deadly or Dangerous Weapon; Engaging in Physical Violence in a Restricted Building or Grounds with a Deadly or Dangerous Weapon; Disorderly Conduct in a Capitol Building; Act of Physical Violence in the Capitol Grounds or Buildings; Parading ... in a Capitol Building	McGrew pleaded Guilty to Assaulting ... Certain Officers or Employees. The other charges are dismissed.	Sentenced on 1/20/2023 to 78 months incarceration; 36 months supervised release; $100 special assessment; $2,000 restitution; $5,000 fine.	McGrew received a full pardon on January 20, 2025
May 27, 2021	Sean Michael McHugh	Federal: Assaulting ... Certain Officers, Aiding and Abetting; Civil Disorder; Assaulting ... Certain Officers Using a Dangerous Weapon (2 counts); Obstruction of an Official Proceeding; Entering ... in a Restricted Building or Grounds with a Deadly or Dangerous Weapon; Disorderly ... in a Restricted Building or Grounds; Engaging in Physical Violence in a Restricted Building or Grounds; Disorderly Conduct in the Capitol Grounds or Buildings; Act of Physical Violence in the Capitol Grounds or Buildings	McHugh pleaded Not Guilty to all charges. Stipulated Bench Trial held on 4/17/2023 and McHugh Guilty on two charges: Assaulting ... Certain Officers Using a Dangerous Weapon; Obstruction of an Official Proceeding. The other charges are dismissed.	Sentenced on 9/7/2023 to 78 months incarceration; 36 months of supervised release; $2,000 restitution; $5,000 fine: $200 special assessment.	McHugh received a full pardon on January 20, 2025
March 18, 2021	Jeffrey McKellop	Federal: Assaulting ... Certain Officers Using a Dangerous Weapon; Inflicting Bodily Injury on Certain Officers; Assaulting ... Certain Officers; Civil Disorder; Entering ... in a Restricted Building or Grounds with a Deadly or Dangerous Weapon; Disorderly ... in a Restricted Building or Grounds with a Deadly or Dangerous Weapon; Engaging in Physical Violence in a Restricted Building or Grounds with a Deadly or Dangerous Weapon; Disorderly Conduct in a Capitol Building; Act of Physical Violence in the Capitol Grounds or Buildings	McKellop pleaded Not Guilty to all charges.	On 1/21/2025, the court grants the government's motion to dismiss the case with prejudice	
December 06, 2023	Kyle Douglas McMahan	Federal: Assaulting ... Certain Officers; Civil Disorder (2 counts); Entering ... in a Restricted Building or Grounds; Disorderly ... in a Restricted Building or Grounds; Disorderly Conduct in a Capitol Building Parading ... in a Capitol Building	McMahan pleaded Guilty to one charge: Assaulting ... Certain Officers. The other charges are dismissed.	Sentenced on 9/10/2024 to 19 Months incarceration; 12 Months of Supervised Release; $100 Special Assessment; $2,000 Restitution; 100 hours of community service.	McMahan received a full pardon on January 20, 2025
November 29, 2022	James McNamara	Federal: Assaulting ... Certain Officers	McNamara pleaded Guilty to the charge.	Sentenced on 8/11/2023 to 12 months incarceration; 24 months of supervised release; Special Assessment of $100; Restitution of $2,000.	McNamara received a full pardon on January 20, 2025
June 28, 2021	Lois Lynn McNicoll	Federal: Entering ... in a Restricted Building; Disorderly ... in a Restricted Building; Violent Entry and Disorderly Conduct in a Capitol Building; Parading ... in a Capitol Building	McNicoll pleaded Guilty to Parading ... in a Capitol building. The other charges are dismissed.	Sentenced 9/6/2022 to 24 Months of Probation with conditions; Special Assessment: $10; Restitution: $500; 80 hours of community service.	McNicoll received a full pardon on January 20, 2025
June 13, 2023	Devin McNulty	Federal: Assaulting ... Certain Officers; Civil Disorder; Entering ... in a Restricted Building or Grounds; Disorderly ... in a Restricted Building or Grounds; Engaging in Physical Violence in a Restricted Building or Grounds; Disorderly Conduct in a Capitol Building; Act of Physical Violence in a Capitol Building or on Capitol Grounds	McNulty pleaded Guilty to one charge: Assaulting ... Certain Officers. The other charges are dismissed.	Sentenced on 6/28/2024 to 12 Months and 1 Day incarceration; 24 Months of Supervised Release; $100 Special Assessment; $2,000 in Restitution; 60 hours of community service directed towards literacy.	McNulty received a full pardon on January 20, 2025
August 02, 2023	Nejourde Meacham	Federal: Knowingly Entering or Remaining in any Restricted Building or GroundsWithout Lawful Authority; Disorderly ... in a Restricted Building or Grounds; Disorderly Conduct in a Capitol Building; Parading ... in a Capitol Building		Due to the death of the defendant on August 28, 2023, the United States respectfully requests that this prosecution be abated. The court grants abatement and the case is closed on 10/11/2023.	
May 15, 2023	Odin Meacham	Federal: Civil Disorder; Assaulting ... Certain Officers Using a Dangerous Weapon (2 counts); Assaulting ... Certain Officers; Entering ... in a Restricted Building or Grounds with a Deadly or Dangerous Weapon; Disorderly ... in a Restricted Building or Grounds with a Deadly or Dangerous Weapon; Engaging in Physical Violence in a Restricted Building or Grounds with a Deadly or Dangerous Weapon; Act of Physical Violence in the Capitol Grounds or Buildings	Meacham pleaded Not Guilty to all charges. Found Guilty on all charges in Bench trial on 6/18/2024.	Sentenced on 11/5/2024 to 72 months incarceration; 24 months of supervised release; Special assessment of $710; Restitution of $2,000.	Meacham received a full pardon on January 20, 2025
September 03, 2024	Clint Dow Medford	Federal: Entering or Remaining in a Restricted Building or Grounds; Disorderly or Disruptive Conduct in a Restricted Building or Grounds; Disorderly Conduct in a Capitol Building; Parading ... in a Capitol Building		On 1/21/2025, the court grants the government's motion to dismiss the case with prejudice.	
February 16, 2024	David Anthony Medina	Federal: Entering ... in a Restricted Building or Grounds; Disorderly ... in a Restricted Building or Grounds; Disorderly Conduct in a Capitol Building or Grounds; Parading ... in a Capitol Building; Obstruction of an Official Proceeding, Destruction of Government Property			On 1/22/2025, the court grants the government's motion to dismiss the case with prejudice.
February 17, 2021	Connie Meggs	Federal: Conspiracy to Obstruct an Official Proceeding; Obstruction of an Official Proceeding and Aiding and Abetting; Conspiracy to Prevent an Officer from Discharging Any Duties; Destruction of Government Property and Aiding and Abetting; Entering ... in a Restricted Building or Grounds	Meggs pleaded Not Guilty to all charges. Jury trial verdict on 3/20/2023 finds Meggs Guilty on all charges.	Sentenced on 8/30/2023 to 15 months of incarceration; 36 months of supervised release; $425 special assessment; $500 restitution.	Meggs received a full pardon on January 20, 2025
February 17, 2021	Kelly Meggs	Federal: Seditious Conspiracy; Conspiracy to Obstruct an Official Proceeding; Obstruction of an Official Proceeding and Aiding and Abetting; Conspiracy to Prevent an Officer from Discharging Any Duties; Destruction of Government Property and Aiding and Abetting; Tampering with Documents or Proceedings	Meggs pleaded Not Guilty to all charges. Jury trial began 9/27/2022. On 11/29/2022, Meggs was found Guilty on five charges: Seditious Conspiracy; Conspiracy to Obstruct an Official Proceeding; Obstruction of an Official Proceeding; Conspiracy to Prevent an Officer from Discharging Any Duties; Tampering with Documents or Proceedings. Not Guilty of Destruction of Government Property and Aiding and Abetting.	Sentenced on 5/25/2023 to 12 years incarceration; 36 months supervised release; $500 special assessment. A proclamation commutes the sentence to time served as of January 20, 2025	
August 12, 2021	David Mehaffie	Federal: Assaulting ... Certain Officers and Aiding and Abetting; Obstruction of an Official Proceeding and Aiding and Abetting; Civil Disorder; Disorderly Conduct in a Capitol Building; Act of Physical Violence in the Capitol Grounds or Buildings	Mehaffie pleaded Not Guilty to all charges. A Bench Trial was held 8/29/2022-9/7/2022. On 9/13/2022, Mehaffie was found guilty of four charges - two felony charges: aiding and abetting in assaulting, resisting, or impeding law enforcement officers, and interfering with a law enforcement officer during a civil disorder; and two misdemeanor charges: disorderly conduct in a Capitol Building and aiding and abetting in committing an act of violence in the Capitol Building or grounds. Not Guilty of Obstruction of an Official Proceeding.	Sentenced 2/24/2023 to 14 months incarceration; 2 years of supervised release; $220 special assessment; $2,000 restitution.	Mehaffie received a full pardon on January 20, 2025
December 04, 2023	Brent Meldrum	Federal: Disorderly Conduct in a Capitol Building; Parading ... in a Capitol Building	Meldrum pleaded Guilty to both charges.	Sentencing set for 5/8/2025. On 2/11/2025, the court ordered that the case is dismissed without prejudice.	
June 10, 2021	Ronald Mele	Federal: Conspiracy to Obstruct an Official Proceeding; Obstruction of an Official Proceeding and Aiding and Abetting; Entering ... in a Restricted Building and Grounds; Disorderly ... in a Restricted Building or Grounds	Mele pleaded Not Guilty to all charges. Found Guilty in a Jury trial on 11/7/2023 on all charges.	Sentenced on 4/19/2024 to 33 months incarceration; 36 month term of supervised release; restitution in the amount of $2,000; special assessment of $250.	Mele received a full pardon on January 20, 2025
February 16, 2021	Jonathan Gennaro Mellis	Federal: Assaulting ... Certain Officers Using a Dangerous Weapon	Mellis pleaded Guilty to the charge.	Sentenced on 12/20/2023 to 51 months incarceration; 3 years Supervised Release; $100 Special Assessment; $20,000 fine and $2,000 Restitution.	Mellis agreed as part of his plea that he used a large wooden stick to "repeatedly strike or stab" police officers on Jan. 6. Mellis had a previous felony criminal conviction for drug trafficking — conspiracy to manufacture or sell methamphetamine — which resulted in a 20-year prison sentence, court documents state. Jan. 6 prosecutors said he also had a history of arrests, which did not result in conviction, including for domestic assault. Mellis received a full pardon on January 20, 2025
July 18, 2022	William Hendry Mellors	Federal: Assaulting ... Certain Officers Using a Dangerous Weapon or Inflicting Bodily Injury; Civil Disorder; Entering ... in a Restricted Building or Grounds; Disorderly ... in a Restricted Building or Grounds; Engaging in Physical Violence in a Restricted Building or Grounds; Disorderly Conduct in a Capitol Building; Act of Physical Violence in the Capitol Grounds or Buildings			Mellors pleaded Not Guilty to all charges. The U.S. seeks abatement of prosecution in this matter on information and belief Mellors died on or about October 10, 2023, in Georgetown, Texas. Case is dismissed.
February 11, 2021	James Allen Mels	Federal: Entering ... in a Restricted Building or Grounds; Disorderly ... in a Restricted Building or Grounds; Disorderly Conduct in a Capitol Building; Parading ... in a Capitol Building	Mels pleaded Guilty to Entering ... in a Restricted Building or Grounds. The other charges are dismissed.	Sentenced on 10/28/2022 to 3 months probation; 3 months home confinement; $500 restitution; $25 special assessment.	Mels received a full pardon on January 20, 2025
February 28, 2024	Matthew James Melsen	Federal: Civil Disorder; Assaulting ... Certain Officers; Entering ... in a Restricted Building or Grounds; Disorderly ... in a Restricted Building or Grounds; Engaging in Physical Violence in a Restricted Building or Grounds; Disorderly Conduct in a Capitol Building; Act of Physical Violence in the Capitol Grounds or Buildings	Melsen pleaded Not Guilty to all charges.	On 1/23/2025, the court ordered that the case is dismissed without prejudice.	
November 21, 2024	Mark Mercurio	Federal: Assaulting ... Certain Officers; Civil Disorder; Entering ... in a Restricted Building or Grounds; Disorderly ... in a Restricted Building or Grounds; Engaging in Physical Violence in a Restricted Building or Grounds; Disorderly Conduct in a Capitol Building; Act of Physical Violence in the Capitol Grounds or Buildings; Parading ... in a Capitol Building		On 1/22/2025, the court grants the government's motion to dismiss the case with prejudice.	
January 7, 2021	Cleveland Grover Meredith Jr.	Federal and DC: Interstate Communication of Threats; Possession of Unregistered Firearms; Possession of Unregistered Ammunition; Possession of Large Capacity Ammunition Feeding Devices	Guilty – one charge: Interstate Communication of Threats.	28 months in jail. Date: December 14, 2021	From Colorado. Alleged to have brought a compact Tavor X95 rifle, two handguns, a "vial of injectable testosterone", and about 320 rounds of armor-piercing ammunition. He allegedly texted acquaintances that he was "gonna run that cunt Pelosi over while she chews on her gums" or "[put] a bullet in her noggin on [l]ive TV", that he "may wander over to [D.C. mayor Muriel Bowser]'s office and put a 5.56 in her skull", and that he "predict[s] that within 12 days, many in our country will die", as well as later texting a photo of himself in blackface. He had previously protested outside of Georgia governor Brian Kemp's home. In October 2026, Meredith was arrested again, this time for allegedly threatening federal judges.
February 04, 2021	William D. Merry Jr.	Federal: Theft of Government Property	Merry pleaded Guilty to the charge.	Sentenced 4/11/2022 to 45 days in jail, nine months of supervised release, including 80 hours community service, $500 restitution; $25 special assessment.	Merry received a full pardon on January 20, 2025
July 28, 2021	Walter J. Messer	Federal: Entering ... in a Restricted Building or Grounds; Disorderly ... in a Restricted Building or Grounds; Disorderly Conduct in a Capitol Building; Parading ... in a Capitol Building	Messer pleaded Guilty to one charge: Parading ... in a Capitol Building. The other charges are dismissed.	Sentenced on 9/11/2023 to 24 months of Probation; 90 days location monitoring; $10 Special Assessment; Restitution of $500; 60 hours community service.	Messer received a full pardon on January 20, 2025
August 10, 2021	Clifford James Meteer	Federal: Entering ... in a Restricted Building or Grounds; Disorderly ... in a Restricted Building or Grounds; Disorderly Conduct in a Capitol Building; Parading ... in a Capitol Building	Meteer pleaded Guilty to one charge: Parading ... in a Capitol Building. The other charges are dismissed.	Sentenced 4/21/2022 to 60 days of Incarceration followed by 36 months of Probation (with conditions); Restitution of $500; Special Assessment of $10.	Meteer received a full pardon on January 20, 2025
February 14, 2024	Thomas J. Method	Federal: Obstruction of an Official Proceeding; Entering ... in a Restricted Building or Grounds; Disorderly ... in a Restricted Building or Grounds; Disorderly Conduct in a Capitol Building; Parading ... in a Capitol Building	Method pleaded Guilty to two charges: Entering ... in a Restricted Building or Grounds and Parading ... in a Capitol Building.	Sentencing set for 1/31/2025. On 1/23/2025, the court grants the government's motion to dismiss the case with prejudice.	
August 01, 2024	Matthew Thomas Mglej	Federal: Knowingly Entering or Remaining in any Restricted Building or Grounds Without Lawful Authority; Knowingly, and with intent to Impede or Disrupt the orderly Conduct of Government Business or Official Functions; Disorderly Conduct in a Capitol Building; Parading ... in a Capitol Building		On 1/24/2025, the court grants the government's motion to dismiss the case with prejudice.	
February 23, 2021	Richard Michetti	Federal: Obstruction of an Official Proceeding and Aiding and Abetting; Entering ... in a Restricted Building or Grounds; Disorderly ... in a Restricted Building or Grounds; Disorderly Conduct in a Capitol Building; Parading ... in a Capitol Building	Michetti pleaded Guilty to one charge: Obstruction of an Official Proceeding and Aiding and Abetting. The other charges are dismissed.	Sentenced 9/6/2022 to 9 months of incarceration, 24 months of supervised release, $2,000 restitution, $100 special assessment.	Michetti received a full pardon on January 20, 2025
January 17, 2024	Theodore Middendorf	Federal: Destruction of Government Property; Entering ... in a Restricted Building or Grounds; Disorderly ... in a Restricted Building or Grounds; Engaging in Physical Violence in a Restricted Building Grounds; Disorderly Conduct in a Capitol Building; Act of Physical Violence in the Capitol Grounds or Buildings; Parading, Picketing, and Demonstrating in a Capitol Building	Middendorf pleaded Guilty to one charge: Destruction of Government Property.	Sentencing set for 2/12/2025. On 1/21/2025, the court grants the government's motion to dismiss the case with prejudice.	In 2024, Middendorf pled guilty to "Predatory Criminal Sexual Assault of a Child." Illinois prosecutors said in a court filing that Middendorf "committed an act of sexual penetration." Indiana state records indicate that Middendorf's victim was 7 years old. He was sentenced to 19 years in prison and remains in custody. The Justice Department moved to dismiss his January 6 case after President Trump granted clemency to those involved.
April 21, 2021	Jalise Middleton	Federal: Assaulting ... Certain Officers; Civil Disorder; Obstruction of an Official Proceeding; Entering or Remaining in a Restricted Building or Grounds; Disorderly ... Restricted Building or Grounds; Engaging in Physical Violence in a Restricted Building or Grounds; Disorderly Conduct in the Capitol Grounds or Buildings; Act of Physical Violence within the Capitol Grounds or Buildings	Not Guilty – all charges		From Forestburg, Texas. Arrested together with her husband (Mark Middleton), by the Dallas office of the FBI on charges that include the assault of multiple police officers during the Capitol attack. Body camera footage from the police show that the couple were both wearing Trump campaign hats
April 21, 2021	Mark Middleton	Federal: Assaulting ... Certain Officers; Civil Disorder; Obstruction of an Official Proceeding; Entering or Remaining in a Restricted Building or Grounds; Disorderly ... Restricted Building or Grounds; Engaging in Physical Violence in a Restricted Building or Grounds; Disorderly Conduct in the Capitol Grounds or Buildings; Act of Physical Violence within the Capitol Grounds or Buildings	Not Guilty – all charges		From Forestburg, Texas. Arrested together with his wife (Jalise Middleton), by the Dallas office of the FBI on charges that include the assault of multiple police officers during the Capitol attack. An FBI report said he had posted a message to Facebook on the day of the incident that referenced the rioters "taking back our house" and concluded with the refrain of "Make America Great Again".
September 08, 2023	Gregory Mijares	Federal: Civil Disorder; Assaulting ... Certain Officers; Entering ... in a Restricted Building or Grounds; Disorderly ... in a Restricted Building or Grounds; Engaging in Physical Violence in a Restricted Building or Grounds; Disorderly Conduct in a Capitol Building; Act of Physical Violence in the Capitol Grounds or Buildings	Mijares pleaded Not Guilty to all charges. Jury Trial set for 3/12/2025.	On 1/23/2025, the court ordered that the case is dismissed without prejudice	
May 14, 2024	Sally Ann Milavec	Federal: Entering ... in a Restricted Building or Grounds; Disorderly ... in a Restricted Building or Grounds; Disorderly Conduct in a Capitol Building or Grounds; Parading ... in a Capitol Building	Milavec pleaded Guilty to one charge: Entering ... in a Restricted Building or Grounds.	Sentencing set for 2/25/2025. On 1/22/2025, the court grants the government's motion to dismiss the case with prejudice	
April 12, 2022	Steven Miles	Federal: Civil Disorder; Assaulting ... Certain Officers; Destruction of Government Property; Entering ... in a Restricted Building or Grounds; Disorderly ... in a Restricted Building or Grounds; Physical Violence in a Restricted Building or Grounds with a Deadly or Dangerous Weapon; Disorderly Conduct in a Capitol Building; Act of Physical Violence in the Capitol Grounds or Buildings; Parading ... in a Capitol Building	Miles pleaded Guilty to one charge: Assaulting ... Certain Officers. The other charges are dismissed.	Sentenced on 2/9/2024 to 24 months of incarceration; 12 months of supervised release; Special assessment of $100; Restitution of $2,000.	Miles received a full pardon on January 20, 2025
March 16, 2021	Aaron James Mileur	Federal: Entering ... in a Restricted Building; Disorderly ... in a Restricted Building; Violent Entry and Disorderly Conduct in a Capitol Building; Parading ... in a Capitol Building	Mileur pleaded Guilty to one charge: Parading ... in a Capitol Building. The other charges are dismissed.	Sentenced on 3/20/2023 to 24 Months Probation; 30 days of location monitoring; 60 hours of community service; $500 Restitution and $10 Special Assessment.	Mileur received a full pardon on January 20, 2025
June 12, 2024	Andrew Thomas Millard	Federal: Entering ... in a Restricted Building or Grounds; Disorderly ... in a Restricted Building or Grounds; Disorderly Conduct in a Capitol Building; Parading ... in a Capitol Building		The government has filed a request for dismissal that remains pending	
May 31, 2022	Adam Miller	Federal: Entering ... in a Restricted Building or Grounds; Disorderly ... in a Restricted Building or Grounds; Disorderly Conduct in a Capitol Building; Parading ... in a Capitol Building.	Miller pleaded Guilty to one charge: Parading ... in a Capitol Building. The other charges are dismissed.	Sentenced on 3/23/2023 to 30 days of incarceration; 36 months of probation; $500 fine; $500 in restitution; $10 special assessment.	Miller received a full pardon on January 20, 2025
April 02, 2024	Andrew Miller	Federal: Entering ... in a Restricted Building or Grounds; Disorderly ... in a Restricted Building or Grounds; Disorderly Conduct in a Capitol Building; Parading ... in a Capitol Building	Miller pleaded Guilty to two charges: Disorderly Conduct in a Capitol Building; Parading ... in a Capitol Building.	Sentencing set for 1/21/2025. On 1/22/2025, the court ordered that the case is dismissed without prejudice.	
March 12, 2021	Brandon James Miller	Federal: Entering ... in a Restricted Building or Grounds; Disorderly ... in a Restricted Building or Grounds; Disorderly Conduct in a Capitol Building; Parading ... in a Capitol Building	Brandon Miller pleaded Guilty to one charge: Parading ... in a Capitol Building. The other charges were dismissed.	Sentenced 12/15/2021 to 20 days of incarceration to be served sequentially to defendant Stephanie Miller's sentence; 60 hours community service; Special assessment of $10; Restitution of $500.	Miller received a full pardon on January 20, 2025
January 20, 2021	Garret Miller	Federal: Civil Disorder (2 counts); Obstruction of an Official Proceeding and Aiding and Abetting; Assaulting ... Certain Officers; Interstate Threats to Injure (2 counts); Entering ... in a Restricted Building or Grounds; Disorderly ... in a Restricted Building or Grounds; Impeding Ingress and Egress in a Restricted Building or Grounds; Disorderly Conduct in a Capitol Building; Impeding Passage Through the Capitol Grounds or Buildings; Parading ... in a Capitol Building; Civil Disorder	Miller pleaded Guilty to nine charges on 12/8/2022. On 12/12/2022, he pleaded Guilty to two more charges: Assaulting ... Certain Officers; Interstate Threats to Injure. The other charges are dismissed.	Sentenced on 2/22/2023 to 38 Months of Incarceration; 36 Months of Supervised Release; Special Assessment of $605.	Miller received a full pardon on January 20, 2025
August 23, 2023	Jared Miller	Federal: Civil Disorder; Assaulting ... Certain Officers (4 counts); Entering ... in a Restricted Building or Grounds; Disorderly ... in a Restricted Building or Grounds; Engaging In Physical Violence in a Restricted Building or Grounds; Disorderly Conduct in a Capitol Building; Act of Physical Violence in the Capitol Grounds or Buildings	Miller pleaded Not Guilty to all charges.	Jury trial set for 4/14/2025. On 1/21/2025, the court grants the government's motion to dismiss the case with prejudice.	
October 23, 2024	Jeremy Michael Miller	Federal: Civil Disorder; Assaulting ... Certain Officers; Entering ... in a Restricted Building or Grounds; Disorderly ... in a Restricted Building or Grounds; Engaging in Physical Violence in a Restricted Building or Grounds; Disorderly Conduct in a Capitol Building; Act of Physical Violence in the Capitol Building or Grounds	Miller pleaded Not Guilty to all charges.	On 1/22/2025, the court grants the government's motion to dismiss the case with prejudice.	
June 13, 2023	Julie Miller	Federal: Entering ... in a Restricted Building or Grounds; Disorderly ... in a Restricted Building or Grounds; Disorderly Conduct in a Capitol Building or Grounds; Parading ... in a Capitol Building	Miller pleaded Guilty to one charge: Entering ... in a Restricted Building or Grounds. The other charges are dismissed.	Sentenced on 4/26/2024 to 36 months of probation; $500 restitution; $25 special assessment; 50 hours of community service.	Miller received a full pardon on January 20, 2025
January 25, 2021	Matthew Ryan Miller	Federal: Civil Disorder; Obstruction of an Official Proceeding and Aiding and Abetting; Assaulting ... Certain Officers Using a Dangerous Weapon; Entering ... in a Restricted Building or Grounds with a Deadly or Dangerous Weapon; Disorderly ... in a Restricted Building or Grounds with a Deadly or Dangerous Weapon; Engaging in Physical Violence in a Restricted Building or Grounds with a Deadly or Dangerous Weapon; Disorderly Conduct in a Capitol Building; Act of Physical Violence in the Capitol Grounds or Buildings; Stepping, Climbing, Removing, or Injuring Property on the Capitol Grounds	Miller pleaded Guilty to two charges: Obstruction of an Official Proceeding and Aiding and Abetting; and Assaulting, Resisting, or Impeding Certain Officers Using a Dangerous Weapon.	The other charges are dismissed. On 5/23/22 Miller was sentenced to 33 months incarceration, 24 months of supervised release, $2,000 restitution, $200 special assessment; 100 hours community service.	Miller received a full pardon on January 20, 2025
December 16, 2022	Scott Miller	Federal: Civil Disorder; Assaulting ... Certain Officers Using a Dangerous Weapon (2 counts);Theft of Government Property; Entering ... in a Restricted Building or Grounds with a Deadly or Dangerous Weapon; Disorderly ... in a Restricted Building or Grounds with a Deadly or Dangerous Weapon; Engaging in Physical Violence in a Restricted Building or Grounds with a Deadly or Dangerous Weapon; Impeding Passage Through the Capitol Grounds or Buildings; Act of Physical Violence in the Capitol Grounds or Buildings	Miller pleaded Guilty to one charge: Assaulting ... Certain Officers Using a Dangerous Weapon. He admits that he forcibly assaulted an officer with a long wood pole. The other charges are dismissed.	Sentenced on 4/19/2024 to 66 months incarceration; 36 months of supervised release; Special assessment of $100; Restitution of $2,000.	Miller received a full pardon on January 20, 2025
December 18, 2024	Shane Kenneth Miller	Federal: Assaulting ... Certain Officers; Entering ... in a Restricted Building or Grounds; Disorderly ... in a Restricted Building or Grounds; Engaging in Physical Violence in a Restricted Building or Grounds; Disorderly Conduct in a Capitol Building; Act of Physical Violence in the Capitol Grounds or Buildings		On 1/22/2025, the court grants the government's motion to dismiss the case with prejudice.	
March 12, 2021	Stephanie Danielle Miller	Federal: Entering ... in a Restricted Building or Grounds; Disorderly ... in a Restricted Building or Grounds; Disorderly Conduct in a Capitol Building; Parading ... in a Capitol Building	Stephanie Miller pleaded Guilty to one charge: Parading ... in a Capitol Building. The other charges were dismissed.	Sentenced 12/15/2021 to 14 days of incarceration to be served sequentially to defendant Brandon Miller's sentence; 60 hours community service; Special assessment of $10; Restitution of $500.	Miller received a full pardon on January 20, 2025
May 15, 2024	Randolph Tyson Milliner	Federal: Disorderly ... in a Capitol Building; Parading ... in a Capitol Building	Milliner pleaded Guilty to both charges.	Sentenced on 10/30/2024 to 24 months probation; fine of $500; restitution of $500; special assessment of $20; 200 hours of community service.	Milliner received a full pardon on January 20, 2025
May 24, 2022	Rodney Kenneth Milstreed	Federal: Civil Disorder; Obstruction of an Official Proceeding; Assaulting ... Certain Officers Using a Dangerous Weapon; Assault by Striking, Beating, or Wounding; Simple Assault; Entering ... in a Restricted Building or Grounds with a Deadly or Dangerous Weapon; Disorderly ... in a Restricted Building or Grounds with a Deadly or Dangerous Weapon; Engaging in Physical Violence in a Restricted Building or Grounds with a Deadly or Dangerous Weapon; Disorderly Conduct in a Capitol Building or Grounds; Act of Physical Violence in the Capitol Grounds or Buildings	Milstreed pleaded Guilty to three counts: Assaulting ... Certain Officers Using a Dangerous Weapon; Assault by Striking, Beating, or Wounding; and Receipt and Possession of an Unregistered Firearm. The other charges are dismissed.	Sentenced on 9/22/2023 to 60 months incarceration; 24 months supervised release; $225 special assessment; $2,000 restitution.	Milstreed received a full pardon on January 20, 2025
January 19, 2021	Jorden Robert Mink	Federal: Obstruction of an Official Proceeding; Theft of Government Property; Destruction of Government Property; Entering ... in a Restricted Building or Grounds with a Deadly or Dangerous Weapon; Disorderly Conduct in a Capitol Building; Act of Physical Violence in the Capitol Grounds or Buildings; Parading ... in a Capitol Building; Civil Disorder; Assaulting ... Certain Officers Using a Dangerous Weapon; Assaulting ... Certain Officers	Mink pleaded Guilty to two charges: Assaulting ... Certain Officers Using a Dangerous Weapon and Theft of Government Property. The other charges are dismissed.	Sentenced on 6/2/2023 to 51 months incarceration; 36 months supervised release; $120 special assessment; $2,000 restitution.	Mink received a full pardon on January 20, 2025
March 6, 2021	Roberto A. Minuta	Federal: Conspiracy; Obstruction of an Official Proceeding and Aiding and Abetting; Destruction of Government Property and Aiding and Abetting; Entering ... Restricted Building or Grounds	Not Guilty – all charges	54 months’ incarceration, 36 months’ supervised release	36-year-old member of Oath Keepers from Hackettstown, New Jersey, acted as a bodyguard to Roger Stone the morning of the insurrection.
May 24, 2022	Rodney Kenneth Milstreed	Federal: Civil Disorder; Obstruction of an Official Proceeding; Assaulting ... Certain Officers Using a Dangerous Weapon; Assault by Striking, Beating, or Wounding; Simple Assault; Entering ... in a Restricted Building or Grounds with a Deadly or Dangerous Weapon; Disorderly ... in a Restricted Building or Grounds with a Deadly or Dangerous Weapon; Engaging in Physical Violence in a Restricted Building or Grounds with a Deadly or Dangerous Weapon; Disorderly Conduct in a Capitol Building or Grounds; Act of Physical Violence in the Capitol Grounds or Buildings	Milstreed pleaded Guilty to three counts: Assaulting ... Certain Officers Using a Dangerous Weapon; Assault by Striking, Beating, or Wounding; and Receipt and Possession of an Unregistered Firearm. The other charges are dismissed.	Sentenced on 9/22/2023 to 60 months incarceration; 24 months supervised release; $225 special assessment; $2,000 restitution.	Milstreed received a full pardon on January 20, 2025
January 19, 2021	Jorden Robert Mink	Federal: Obstruction of an Official Proceeding; Theft of Government Property; Destruction of Government Property; Entering ... in a Restricted Building or Grounds with a Deadly or Dangerous Weapon; Disorderly Conduct in a Capitol Building; Act of Physical Violence in the Capitol Grounds or Buildings; Parading ... in a Capitol Building; Civil Disorder; Assaulting ... Certain Officers Using a Dangerous Weapon; Assaulting ... Certain Officers	Mink pleaded Guilty to two charges: Assaulting ... Certain Officers Using a Dangerous Weapon and Theft of Government Property. The other charges are dismissed.	Sentenced on 6/2/2023 to 51 months incarceration; 36 months supervised release; $120 special assessment; $2,000 restitution.	Mink received a full pardon on January 20, 2025
January 15, 2021	David Charles Mish Jr.	Federal: Entering ... in a Restricted Building; Disorderly ... in a Restricted Building; Violent Entry and Disorderly Conduct in a Capitol Building; Parading ... in a Capitol Building	Mish pleaded Guilty to one charge: Parading ... in a Capitol Building. The other charges were dismissed.	Sentenced 11/18/2021 to 30 days incarceration; restitution of $500; and $10 Special Assessment.	Mish received a full pardon on January 20, 2025
March 07, 2024	Jennifer Suzanne Mitchell	Federal: Entering ... in a Restricted Building or Grounds; Disorderly ... in a Restricted Building or Grounds; Disorderly Conduct in a Capitol Building or Grounds; Parading ... in a Capitol Building	Mitchell pleaded Guilty to one charge: Entering ... in a Restricted Building or Grounds.	Sentencing set for 3/6/2025. On 1/22/2025, the court grants the government's motion to dismiss the case with prejudice	
October 20, 2021	Landon Bryce Mitchell	Federal: Obstruction of Justice/Congress; Knowingly Entering ... Restricted Building or Grounds Without Lawful Authority; Disorderly ...ny Restricted Building or Grounds Without Lawful Authority; Entering and Remaining on the Floor of Either House of Congress; Disorderly Conduct in a Capitol Building; Parading ... in a Capitol Building.		27 months’ incarceration, 36 months’ supervised release, $2,000 restitution	Bragged about being "one of the very first" to breach the Capitol, looked inside a senator's desk on the Senate floor, and posed for a photo with Jake Angeli (the "QAnon Shaman"). He had said he expected that the mask he wore at the Capitol would hide his identity; however, another man, arrested July 29 for his participation at the Capitol, identified him to authorities.
February 01, 2023	Kyle Mlynarek	Federal: Civil Disorder; Entering ... in a Restricted Building or Grounds; Disorderly ... in a Restricted Building or Grounds; Disorderly Conduct in a Capitol Building; Parading ... in a Capitol Building	Mlynarek initially pleaded Not Guilty to all charges. On 10/16/2023, he pleaded Guilty to four charges: Entering ... in a Restricted Building or Grounds; Disorderly ... in a Restricted Building or Grounds; Disorderly Conduct in a Capitol Building; Parading ... in a Capitol Building. On 10/18/2023 in a Bench trial, he was found Not Guilty of Civil Disorder.	Sentenced on 2/21/2024 to 100 days incarceration; supervised release of 12 Months; Special Assessment of $70; fine of $1,000; restitution of $500; 200 hours of community service.	Mlynarek received a full pardon on January 20, 2025
April 09, 2021	Anthony Richard Moat	Federal: Entering ... in a Restricted Building; Disorderly ... in a Restricted Building; Violent Entry and Disorderly Conduct; Parading ... in a Capitol Building	Moat pleaded Guilty to one charge: Parading ... in a Capitol Building. The other charges are dismissed.	Sentenced on 1/27/2023 to 10 Days Incarceration; Restitution Of $500; Special Assessment Of $10.	Moat received a full pardon on January 20, 2025
June 11, 2021	Brian Christopher Mock	Federal: Obstruction of an Official Proceeding; Civil Disorder; Assaulting ... Certain Officers (3 counts); Assaulting ... Certain Officers using a Dangerous Weapon; Theft of Government Property; Entering ... in a Restricted Building or Grounds with a Deadly or Dangerous Weapon; Disorderly ... in a Restricted Building or Grounds with a Deadly or Dangerous Weapon; Engaging in Physical Violence in a Restricted Building or Grounds with a Deadly or Dangerous Weapon; Act of Physical Violence in the Capitol Grounds or Buildings	Mock pleaded Not Guilty to all charges. Bench Trial on 7/12/2023 found him Guilty on all charges.	Sentenced on 2/22/2024 to 33 months incarceration; 24 months Supervised Release; Special Assessments totaling $710; Restitution in the amount of $2,000. The USCA vacated the Obstruction conviction on 11/20/2024. Resentenced on 1/3/2025 to time served; 24 months of Supervised Release; Special Assessment of $510; Restitution of $2,000.	Mock received a full pardon on January 20, 2025
December 20, 2022	Paul Modrell	Federal: Entering ... in a Restricted Building or Grounds; Disorderly ... in a Restricted Building or Grounds; Disorderly Conduct in a Capitol Building; Parading ... in a Capitol Building	Modrell pleaded Guilty to one charge: Parading ... in a Capitol Building. The other charges are dismissed.	Sentenced on 10/20/2023 to 36 Months Probation; 90 Days of Home Detention; Fine of $1,500; Restitution of $500; Special Assessment of $10.	Modrell received a full pardon on January 20, 2025
July 02, 2021	David Moerschel	Federal: Seditious Conspiracy; Conspiracy to Obstruct an Official Proceeding; Obstruction of an Official Proceeding and Aiding and Abetting; Conspiracy to Prevent an Officer from Discharging Any Duties; Destruction of Government Property and Aiding and Abetting; Tampering with Documents or Proceedings	Moerschel pleaded Not Guilty to all charges. Jury trial held from 12/6/2022-1/23/2023. He was found Guilty on four charges: Seditious Conspiracy, Conspiracy to Obstruct an Official Proceeding, Obstruction of an Official Proceeding and Aiding and Abetting, Conspiracy to Prevent an Officer from Discharging Any Duties; and Not Guilty on two charges: Destruction of Government Property and Aiding and Abetting, Tampering with Documents or Proceedings.	Sentenced on 6/2/2023 to 36 months of incarceration; 36 months of supervised release; $400 special assessment. A proclamation commutes the sentence to time served as of January 20, 2025	
November 07, 2024	Michael Mollo, Jr.	Federal: Entering ... in a Restricted Building or Grounds; Disorderly ... in a Restricted Building or Grounds; Disorderly Conduct in a Capitol Building or Grounds; Parading ... in a Capitol Building; Civil Disorder		On 1/24/2025, the court grants the government's motion to dismiss the case with prejudice	
June 07, 2023	Peter Geoffrey Moloney	Federal: Assaulting ... Certain Officers; Assault by Striking	Moloney pleaded Guilty to the two charges.	Sentencing set for 2/11/2025. On 1/21/2025, the court grants the government's motion to dismiss the case with prejudice.	
January 18, 2021	Nicolas Anthony Moncada	Federal: Parading ... in a Capitol Building	Moncada pleaded Guilty to the charge.	Sentenced on 11/8/2023 to 36 months probation; $10 special assessment; $500 restitution; 30 days location monitoring.	Moncada received a full pardon on January 20, 2025
November 09, 2023	Amanda Jean Mongelli	Federal: Entering ... in a Restricted Building or Grounds; Disorderly ... in a Restricted Building or Grounds; Disorderly Conduct in a Capitol Building or Grounds; Parading ... in a Capitol Building	Mongelli pleaded Guilty to two charges: Disorderly Conduct in a Capitol Building or Grounds; Parading ... in a Capitol Building. The other charges are dismissed.	Sentenced on 8/20/2024 to 24 months of probation; $20 Special Assessment; Restitution of $500; 40 hours of community service.	Mongelli received a full pardon on January 20, 2025
April 26, 2022	Matthew Montalvo	Federal: Entering ... in a Restricted Building or Grounds; Disorderly ... in a Restricted Building or Grounds; Disorderly Conduct in a Capitol Building; Parading ... in a Capitol Building	Montalvo pleaded Guilty to one charge: Parading ... in a Capitol Building. The other charges are dismissed.	Sentenced 1/13/2023 to 36 Months of Probation; 90 days location monitoring; $10 Special Assessment; Restitution of $500. Fine of $5,000; 60 hours of community service.	Montalvo received a full pardon on January 20, 2025
January 29, 2021	Wilmar Jeovanny Montano Alvarado	Federal: Civil Disorder; Obstruction of an Official Proceeding; Assaulting ... Certain Officers; Entering ... in a Restricted Building or Grounds; Disorderly ... in a Restricted Building or Grounds; Disorderly Conduct in a Capitol Building; Impeding Passage Through the Capitol Grounds or Buildings	Montano Alvarado pleaded Not Guilty to all charges. Found Guilty on all charges in a Bench trial on 10/24/2023. The court agrees to dismiss Count two, Obstruction.	Sentencing set for 2/4/2025. On 1/22/2025, the court grants the government's motion to dismiss the case with prejudice	
January 17, 2021	Patrick Montgomery	Federal: Assaulting ... Certain Officers; Civil Disorder; Engaging in Physical Violence in a Restricted Building or Grounds; Act of Physical Violence in the Capitol Grounds or Buildings; Entering ... in a Restricted Building or Grounds; Disorderly ... in a Restricted Building or Grounds; Disorderly Conduct in a Capitol Building; Parading ... in a Capitol Building; Entering ... in the Gallery of Congress; Obstruction of an Official Proceeding	Montgomery pleaded Not Guilty to all charges. Found Guilty on two charges in a Stipulated Bench trial on 3/20/2024: Assaulting ... Certain Officers; and Obstruction of an Official Proceeding. On 10/9/2024, the court dismissed the Obstruction charge. The other charges are dismissed.	Sentenced on 10/31/2024 to 37 months incarceration; 36 months of supervised release; $100 special assessment.	Montgomery received a full pardon on January 20, 2025
March 09, 2021	Corinne Montoni	Federal: Civil Disorder	Montoni pleaded Guilty to the charge.	Sentenced on 9/28/2023 to 30 days incarceration; 24 months of supervised release; a special assessment of $100; restitution of $2,000.	Montoni received a full pardon on January 20, 2025
April 13, 2021	Samuel Christopher Montoya	Federal: Entering ... in a Restricted Building; Disorderly ... in a Restricted Building; Disorderly Conduct in a Capitol Building; Impeding Passage Through the Capitol Grounds or Buildings; Parading ... in a Capitol Building	Montoya pleaded Guilty to one charge: Parading ... in a Capitol Building. The other charges are dismissed.	Sentenced on 4/5/2023 to 36 months of Probation; 120 hours of location monitoring; 60 hours of community service; Special assessment of $10; Restitution of $500; Fine of $1,500.	Montoya received a full pardon on January 20, 2025
October 01, 2021	Maryann Mooney-Rondon	Federal: Obstruction of an Official Proceeding; Theft of Government Property (2 counts); Entering ... in a Restricted Building or Grounds; Disorderly ... in a Restricted Building or Grounds; Entering ... in the Gallery of Congress; Entering ... in Certain Rooms in the Capitol Building; Disorderly Conduct in a Capitol Building; Parading ... in a Capitol Building	Mooney-Rondon pleaded Not Guilty to all charges. Stipulated Bench Trial held on 3/27/2023. The Court found her Guilty on counts 1 and 3: Obstruction of an Official Proceeding; Theft of Government Property. The other charges are dismissed.	Sentenced on 11/29/2023 to 5 years of probation with the first 12 months to be served in home incarceration; $3,657.51 in restitution; a fine of $7,500; 350 hours of community service; special assessment of $125. On 9/12/2024, the USCA vacated the Obstruction conviction. Re-sentencing set for 2/7/2025. On 1/21/2025, the court grants the government's motion to dismiss the case with prejudice	
May 15, 2024	Carol Moore	Federal: Entering or Remaining in a Restricted Building or Grounds; Disorderly or Disruptive Conduct in a Restricted Building or Grounds; Disorderly Conduct in a Capitol Building; Parading ... in a Capitol Building	Moore pleaded Not Guilty to all charges.	On 1/21/2025, the court grants the government's motion to dismiss the case with prejudice	
May 16, 2024	Craig Jackson Moore	Federal: Entering ... in a Restricted Building or Grounds; Disorderly ... in a Restricted Building or Grounds; Disorderly Conduct in a Capitol Building or Grounds; Parading ... in a Capitol Building	Moore pleaded Guilty to two charges: Disorderly Conduct in a Capitol Building or Grounds; Parading ... in a Capitol Building.	Sentencing set for 2/25/2025. On 1/22/2025, the court grants the government's motion to dismiss the case with prejudice	
May 15, 2024	Kevin Moore	Federal: Entering or Remaining in a Restricted Building or Grounds; Disorderly or Disruptive Conduct in a Restricted Building or Grounds; Disorderly Conduct in a Capitol Building; Parading ... in a Capitol Building	Moore pleaded Not Guilty to all charges.	On 1/21/2025, the court grants the government's motion to dismiss the case with prejudice	
September 16, 2024	Kevin G. Moore	Federal: Conspiracy to Impede or Injure Officers; Entering ... in a Restricted Building or Grounds; Disorderly ... in a Restricted Building or Grounds; Disorderly Conduct in a Capitol Building; Parading ... in a Capitol Building	Moore pleaded Not Guilty to all charges.	On 1/21/2025, the court grants the government's motion to dismiss the case with prejudice	
April 06, 2021	Andrew Jackson Morgan Jr.	Federal: Obstruction of an Official Proceeding; Entering ... in a Restricted Building or Grounds; Disorderly ... in a Restricted Building or Grounds; Disorderly Conduct in a Capitol Building	Morgan pleaded Guilty to one charge: Entering ... in a Restricted Building or Grounds. The other charges are dismissed.	Sentenced on 9/22/2023 to 110 days of Incarceration followed by 12 months of Supervised Release (with conditions); $25 Special Assessment; Restitution of $500.	Morgan received a full pardon on January 20, 2025
February 24, 2021	Anna Morgan-Lloyd	Federal: Entering ... in a Restricted Building; Disorderly ... in a Restricted Building; Violent Entry and Disorderly Conduct in a Capitol Building; Parading ... in a Capitol Building	Morgan-Lloyd pleaded Guilty to Parading ... in a Capitol Building, and the other charges were dismissed.	Sentenced 6/23/2021 to 36 months of probation; 120 hours of community service; $10 special assessment and $500 of restitution.	Morgan-Lloyd received a full pardon on January 20, 2025
February 10, 2022	Katharine Hallock Morrison	Federal: Obstruction of an Official Proceeding and Aiding and Abetting; Entering ... in a Restricted Building or Grounds; Disorderly ... in a Restricted Building or Grounds; Entering ... on the Floor of Congress; Disorderly Conduct in a Capitol Building; Parading ... in a Capitol Building	Morrison pleaded Guilty to one charge: Obstruction of an Official Proceeding. The other charges are dismissed.	Sentenced on 5/11/2023 to 8 months of incarceration; 8 months home detention; 24 months supervised release; $100 special assessment; $2,000 restitution.	Morrison received a full pardon on January 20, 2025
November 04, 2021	Daniel Michael Morrissey	Federal: Entering ... in a Restricted Building or Ground; Disorderly ... in a Restricted Building or Grounds; Disorderly Conduct in a Capitol Building; Parading ... in a Capitol Building	Morrissey pleaded Guilty to one charge: Parading ... in a Capitol Building. The other charges are dismissed. Sentenced 8/16/2022 to 45 days of incarceration, three years of probation, $2,500 fine, $500 restitution; $10 special assessment. Resentencing hearing held on 4/10/2022.	Sentenced to 3 Years of Probation; Special Assessment in the amount of $10; Restitution in the amount of $500.	Morrissey received a full pardon on January 20, 2025
June 11, 2021	Robert Morss	Federal: Robbery (baton, fence, shield from 3 different MPD officers); Assaulting ... Certain Officers and Aiding and Abetting; Obstruction of an Official Proceeding and Aiding and Abetting; Civil Disorder; Disorderly ... in a Restricted Building or Grounds with a Deadly or Dangerous Weapon; Engaging in Physical Violence in a Restricted Building or Grounds with a Deadly or Dangerous Weapon; Disorderly Conduct in a Capitol Building; Act of Physical Violence in the Capitol Grounds or Buildings	At a stipulated bench trial on 8/23/2022, Morss was found Guilty of Robbery; Assaulting ... Certain Officers; and Obstruction of an Official Proceeding. He admitted to a stipulated set of facts. The other charges are dismissed.	Sentenced on 5/24/2023 to 66 Months of Incarceration; 24 Months of Supervised Release; Special Assessment of $300; Restitution of $2,000.	Morss received a full pardon on January 20, 2025
March 06, 2024	Donald Lee Moss	Federal: Civil Disorder; Assaulting ... Certain Officers (2 counts); Entering ... in a Restricted Building or Grounds; Disorderly ... in a Restricted Building or Grounds; Disorderly Conduct in a Capitol Building; Parading ... in a Capitol Building	Moss pleaded Guilty to one charge: Assaulting ... Certain Officers.	Sentencing set for 2/13/2025. On 1/22/2025, the court ordered that the case is dismissed without prejudice	
January 12, 2021	Aaron Mostofsky	Federal: Civil Disorder; Obstruction of an Official Proceeding; Assaulting ... Certain Officers; Theft of Government Property; Entering ... Restricted Building or Grounds; Disorderly ... Restricted Building or Grounds; Disorderly Conduct in a Capitol Building; Parading ... in a Capitol Building	Not Guilty – all charges	Sentenced to eight months in prison, followed by 12 months of supervised release, including 200 hours of community service and $2,000 restitution.	34-year-old son of a Kings County Supreme Court judge, arrested in Brooklyn; he had been seen carrying a Capitol Police riot shield and also told the New York Post "the election was stolen".
May 13, 2021	Jon Thomas Mott	Federal: Entering ... in a Restricted Building; Disorderly ... in a Restricted Building; Violent Entry and Disorderly Conduct in a Capitol Building; Parading ... in a Capitol Building	Mott pleaded Guilty to one charge: Parading ... in a Capitol Building. The other charges are dismissed.	Sentenced on 4/26/2023 to 30 days incarceration; 36 months of probation; special assessment of $10; fine of $500; restitution of $500.	Mott received a full pardon on January 20, 2025
February 25, 2021	Christopher Patrick Moynihan	Federal: Obstruction of an Official Proceeding; Entering ... in a Restricted Building or Grounds; Disorderly ... in a Restricted Building or Grounds; Entering ... on the Floor of Congress; Disorderly Conduct in a Capitol Building; Parading ... in a Capitol Building	Stipulated Bench Trial/Plea Agreement Hearing held on 8/23/2022 finds Moynihan Guilty as to one count: Obstruction of an Official Proceeding. Moynihan also enters a Plea of Guilty as to the remaining counts.	Sentenced on 2/3/2023 to 21 months incarceration; 36 months supervised release; special assessment of $180.	Moynihan received a full pardon on January 20, 2025. On October 6, 2025, Moynihan was arrested on a felony count of making terroristic threats against House minority leader Hakeem Jeffries. He pled guilty to a lesser misdemeanor charge of harassment in the case on February 6, 2026.
April 04, 2024	Charles Lee Roy Mozingo III	Federal: Disorderly Conduct in a Capitol Building; Parading ... in a Capitol Building	Mozingo pleaded Guilty to both charges.	Sentencing set for 5/22/2025. On 2/10/2025, the court ordered that the case is dismissed without prejudice.	
February 23, 2021	Clayton Ray Mullins	Federal: Inflicting Bodily Injury on Certain Officers and Aiding and Abetting; Assaulting ... Certain Officers; Civil Disorder; Entering ... in a Restricted Building or Grounds; Disorderly ... in a Restricted Building or Grounds; Engaging in Physical Violence in a Restricted Building or Grounds; Act of Physical Violence in the Capitol Grounds or Buildings	Mullins pleaded Guilty to one charge: Assaulting ... Certain Officers. The other charges are dismissed.	Sentenced on 1/30/2024 to 30 Months of incarceration; 3 Years of Supervised Release; Special Assessment: $100; Restitution: $2,000 (Architect of the Capitol) and $30,165.65 (Metropolitan Police Department); Fine $49,764.	Mullins received a full pardon on January 20, 2025
June 03, 2024	David Mullsteff	Federal: Entering ... in a Restricted Building or Grounds; Disorderly ... in a Restricted Building or Grounds; Disorderly Conduct in a Capitol Building; Parading ... in a Capitol Building	Mullsteff pleaded Guilty to one charge: Entering ... in a Restricted Building or Grounds.	Sentencing set for 1/24/2025. On 1/22/2025, the court ordered that the case is dismissed without prejudice.	
April 23, 2021	Jonathan Joshua Munafo	Federal: Civil Disorder; Assaulting ... Certain Officers; Obstruction of an Official Proceeding; Entering ... on Restricted Grounds with a Dangerous Weapon; Disorderly ... in a Restricted Building or Grounds with a Dangerous Weapon; Act of Physical Violence against Property on Restricted Grounds with a Dangerous Weapon; Act of Physical Violence against Person on Restricted Grounds; Theft of Government Property; Disorderly Conduct in a Capitol Building; Act of Physical Violence on the Capitol Grounds	Munafo pleaded Guilty to two charges: Civil Disorder; and Assaulting ... Certain Officers. The other charges are dismissed.	Sentenced on 9/22/2023 to 33 months incarceration with credit for time served; 36 months of Supervised Release; Special Assessment of $200; Restitution of $2,000.	Munafo received a full pardon on January 20, 2025
January 10, 2021	Eric Gavelek Munchel	Federal: Conspiracy to Commit Obstruction; Obstruction of an Official Proceeding; Entering ... Restricted Building or Grounds with a Deadly or Dangerous Weapon; Disorderly ... Restricted Building or Grounds with a Deadly or Dangerous Weapon; Unlawful Possession of a Dangerous Weapon on Capitol Grounds or Buildings; Entering and Remaining in the Gallery of Congress; Disorderly Conduct in a Capitol Building; Parading ... in a Capitol Building	Not Guilty – all charges	Sentenced to five years in prison	Aged 30, from Nashville, Tennessee. One of the two men seen carrying plastic handcuffs as they moved through the Capitol. He was pictured in a black cap and holding a fistful of zip ties as he jumped over railing in the Senate gallery. He attended the riot with his mother. He told the Sunday Times the Capitol attack "was a kind of flexing of muscles" and that "the point of getting inside the building is to show them that we can, and we will." In a Jan 24 court filing, federal prosecutors asserted that evidence showed that he engaged in "obstructing Congress, interstate travel in furtherance of rioting activity, sedition and other offenses." Federal judge Beryl A. Howell reversed a previous lower court decision that granted conditional release and ordered him to be transferred to Washington for further hearings.
March 23, 2022	Jeffrey Munger	Federal: Parading ... in a Capitol Building	Munger pleaded Guilty to the single charge.	Sentenced 10/21/2022 to 30 months of probation; 90 days location monitoring; 60 hours of community service, $500 restitution; $10 special assessment.	Munger received a full pardon on January 20, 2025
July 13, 2021	Dawn Munn	Federal: Entering ... in a Restricted Building or Grounds; Disorderly ... in a Restricted Building or Grounds; Disorderly Conduct in a Capitol Building; Parading ... in a Capitol Building	Dawn Munn pleaded Guilty to one charge: Parading ... in a Capitol Building. The other charges are dismissed.	Sentenced on 10/12/2022 to 36 months of probation, including 14 days of intermittent incarceration to be served in two 7-day periods; 90 days of home confinement; $10 special assessment; $500 restitution.	Munn received a full pardon on January 20, 2025
July 13, 2021	Joshua Munn	Federal: Entering ... in a Restricted Building or Grounds; Disorderly ... in a Restricted Building or Grounds; Disorderly Conduct in a Capitol Building; Parading ... in a Capitol Building	Joshua Munn pleaded Guilty to one charge: Parading ... in a Capitol Building. The other charges are dismissed.	Sentenced on 10/12/2022 to 36 months probation; $10 special assessment; $500 restitution; 60 hours community service.	Munn received a full pardon on January 20, 2025
July 13, 2021	Kayli Munn	Federal: Entering ... in a Restricted Building or Grounds; Disorderly ... in a Restricted Building or Grounds; Disorderly Conduct in a Capitol Building; Parading ... in a Capitol Building	Kayli Munn pleaded Guilty to one charge: Parading ... in a Capitol Building. The other charges are dismissed.	Sentenced on 10/12/2022 to 36 months probation; $10 special assessment; $500 restitution; 60 hours of community service.	Munn received a full pardon on January 20, 2025
July 13, 2021	Kristi Marie Munn	Federal: Entering ... in a Restricted Building or Grounds; Disorderly ... in a Restricted Building or Grounds; Disorderly Conduct in a Capitol Building; Parading ... in a Capitol Building	Kristi Munn pleaded Guilty to one charge: Parading ... in a Capitol Building. The other charges are dismissed.	Sentenced on 10/12/2022 to 36 months Probation with 90 days of home detention; special assessment of $10.00; restitution of $500; 60 hours of community service.	Munn received a full pardon on January 20, 2025
July 13, 2021	Thomas Munn	Federal: Entering ... in a Restricted Building or Grounds; Disorderly ... in a Restricted Building or Grounds; Disorderly Conduct in a Capitol Building; Parading ... in a Capitol Building	Thomas Munn pleaded Guilty to one charge: Parading ... in a Capitol Building. The other charges are dismissed.	Sentenced on 10/12/2022 to 36 months of probation, including 14 days of intermittent incarceration to be served in two 7-day periods; 90 days of location monitoring; $10 special assessment; $500 restitution.	Munn received a full pardon on January 20, 2025
January 18, 2021	Henry Phillip Muntzer	Federal: Obstruction of an Official Proceeding and Aiding and Abetting; Civil Disorder; Entering ... in a Restricted Building or Grounds; Disorderly ... in a Restricted Building or Grounds; Disorderly Conduct in a Capitol Building; Parading ... in a Capitol Building	Muntzer pleaded Not Guilty to all charges. Found Guilty on all charges on 2/7/2024 in a Bench trial. Motion to dismiss count 1, Obstruction, is granted on 8/8/2024.	Sentenced on 10/10/2024 to 24 months incarceration; 12 months supervised release; $170 supervised release; $2,000 restitution.	Muntzer received a full pardon on January 20, 2025
December 01, 2021	Rachel Myers	Federal: Entering ... in a Restricted Building or Grounds; Disorderly ... in a Restricted Building or Grounds; Disorderly Conduct in a Capitol Building; Parading ... in a Capitol Building	Myers pleaded Guilty to one charge: Parading ... in a Capitol Building. The other charges are dismissed.	Sentenced on 2/16/2023 to 24 months of probation; Special Assessment of $10; Restitution in the amount of $500; 60 hours of community service.	Myers received a full pardon on January 20, 2025
February 16, 2021	Verden Andrew Nalley	Federal: Entering ... in a Restricted Building or Grounds	Nalley pleaded Guilty to the single charge.	Sentenced 3/10/2022 to 2 years of probation, $500 restitution; $25 special assessment; 60 hours of community service.	Nalley received a full pardon on January 20, 2025
May 10, 2021	John Maron Nassif	Federal: Entering ... in a Restricted Building; Disorderly ... in a Restricted Building; Violent Entry and Disorderly Conduct; Parading ... in a Capitol Building	Nassif pleaded Not Guilty to all charges. Found Guilty on all charges in a Bench trial on 12/8/2022.	Sentenced on 4/27/2023 to 7 months of incarceration; 12 months of Supervised Release; Special Assessment of $70; Restitution of $500; Fine of $1,000.	Nassif received a full pardon on January 20, 2025
June 13, 2023	Mark Nealy	Federal: Parading ... in a Capitol Building	Nealy pleaded Guilty to the charge.	Sentenced on 12/20/2023 to 14 Days Incarceration; Restitution Of $500; Special Assessment Of $10.	Nealy received a full pardon on January 20, 2025
September 13, 2021	Marshall Neefe	Federal: Conspiracy to Obstruct Official Proceeding; Obstruction of an Official Proceeding and Aiding and Abetting; Civil Disorder; Assaulting ... Certain Officers Using a Dangerous Weapon and Aiding and Abetting; Entering ... in a Restricted Building or Grounds with a Deadly or Dangerous Weapon; Disorderly ... in a Restricted Building or Grounds with a Deadly or Dangerous Weapon; Engaging in Physical Violence in a Restricted Building or Grounds with a Deadly or Dangerous Weapon and Aiding and Abetting; Disorderly Conduct in a Capitol Building or Grounds; Act of Physical Violence in the Capitol Grounds or Buildings; Parading ... in a Capitol Building	Neefe pleaded Guilty to two charges: Conspiracy to Obstruct Official Proceeding and a lesser offense as to 4s of Assaulting ... Certain Officers and Aiding and Abetting. The other charges are dismissed.	Sentenced on 9/23/2022 to 41 months incarceration; three years of supervised release; $2,000 restitution.	Neefe received a full pardon on January 20, 2025
October 18, 2021	Darrell Neely	Federal: Civil Disorder; Theft of Government Property; Entering ... in a Restricted Building or Grounds; Disorderly ... in a Restricted Building or Grounds; Disorderly Conduct in a Capitol Building; Parading ... in a Capitol Building	Neely pleaded Not Guilty to all charges. In a Bench trial on 5/25/2023, he was found Not Guilty on one charge; Civil Disorder. Found Guilty on the remaining charges.	Sentenced on 9/5/2023 to 28 months incarceration; 12 months supervised release; Special assessment of $95; Restitution of $844.93.	Neely received a full pardon on January 20, 2025
May 03, 2021	Brandon Nelson	Federal: Entering ... in a Restricted Building or Grounds; Disorderly ... in a Restricted Building or Grounds; Violent Entry or Disorderly Conduct; Parading ... in a Capitol Building	Nelson pleaded Guilty to one charge: Parading ... in a Capitol Building. The other charges were dismissed.	Sentenced 12/10/2021 to 24 months of Probation; $500 in restitution; a fine in the amount of $2,500.00; a special assessment of $10.00; 50 hours of community service.	Nelson received a full pardon on January 20, 2025
March 22, 2023	Bradley Scott Nelson	Federal: Obstruction of an Official Proceeding; Entering ... in a Restricted Building or Grounds; Disorderly ... in a Restricted Building or Grounds; Disorderly Conduct in a Capitol Building; Parading ... in a Capitol Building	Nelson pleaded Guilty to two charges: Disorderly ... in a Restricted Building or Grounds; Disorderly Conduct in a Capitol Building. On 10/18/2024, the court dismisses the Obstruction charge.	Sentencing set for 2/7/2025. On 1/21/2025, the court grants the government's motion to dismiss the case with prejudice.	
October 04, 2023	Derek Andrew Nelson	Federal: Entering ... in a Restricted Building or Grounds; Disorderly ... in a Restricted Building or Grounds; Disorderly Conduct on Capitol Grounds; Parading ... in Capitol Building	Nelson pleaded Guilty to one charge: Entering ... in a Restricted Building or Grounds. The other charges are dismissed.	Sentenced on 7/10/2024 to 75 Days of Incarceration; 12 Months of Supervised Release (with conditions); $500 Restitution; $25 Special Assessment.	Nelson received a full pardon on January 20, 2025
May 20, 2022	Lynnwood Nester	Federal: Entering ... in a Restricted Building or Grounds; Disorderly ... in a Restricted Building or Grounds; Disorderly Conduct in a Capitol Building or Grounds; Parading ... in a Capitol Building	Nester pleaded Not Guilty to all charges. Found Guilty on all charges in a Jury trial on 3/7/2024.	Sentenced on 7/19/2024 to 10 months incarceration; 6 months of Supervised Release; $70 Special Assessment; $500 restitution; $500 fine.	Nester received a full pardon on January 20, 2025
March 23, 2021	Evan Neumann	Federal: Civil Disorder; Assaulting ... Certain Officers; Influencing, Impeding, or Retaliating Against a Federal Official; Entering ... in a Restricted Building or Grounds; Disorderly ... in a Restricted Building or Grounds; Engaging in Physical Violence in a Restricted Building or Grounds; Disorderly Conduct in a Capitol Building; Act of Physical Violence in the Capitol Grounds or Buildings; Parading ... in a Capitol Building		Neumann fled to Belarus and applied for asylum there. He was granted asylum in March, 2022. On 3/11/2022, Neumann's case was directly reassigned to the Calendar Committee as the defendant is a fugitive. On 1/24/2025, the motion to quash Arrest Warrant on a Complaint is granted.	On 1/27/2025, the court grants the government's motion to dismiss the case with prejudice.
October 22, 2024	Jeffrey Newcomb	Federal: Obstruction of Law Enforcement During Civil Disorder; Assaulting/Resisting/Impeding a Federal Officer While Using or Carrying a Deadly or Dangerous Weapon; Entering or Remaining in any Restricted Building or Grounds; Disorderly or Disruptive Conduct in a Restricted Building or Grounds; Disorderly Conduct in a Capitol Building or Grounds		On 1/22/2025, the court grants the government's motion to dismiss the case with prejudice.	
January 18, 2021	Ryan Taylor Nichols	Federal: Obstruction of an Official Proceeding; Assaulting ... Certain Officers	Nichols pleaded Guilty to the two charges.	Sentenced on 5/2/2024 to 63 months incarceration; 36 months of supervised release; fine of $200,000; restitution of $2,000; special assessment of $200.	Nichols received a full pardon on January 20, 2025. On May 10, 2026, Nichols was arrested by the Harrison County, Texas, sheriff's office after allegedly displaying a handgun in a dispute with another churchgoer.
November 09, 2023	William Arthur Nichols, Jr.	Federal: Civil Disorder; Assaulting ... Certain Officers Using a Dangerous Weapon (2 counts); Inflicting Bodily Injury on Certain Officers; Entering ... in a Restricted Building or Grounds with a Deadly or Dangerous Weapon; Disorderly ... in a Restricted Building or Grounds; Engaging in Physical Violence in a Restricted Building or Grounds; Disorderly Conduct within the Capitol Grounds; Act of Physical Violence in the Capitol Grounds or Buildings	Nichols pleaded Not Guilty to all charges.	Jury trial set for 4/7/2025. On 1/21/2025, the court grants the government's motion to dismiss the case with prejudice.	
January 18, 2022	Kirstyn Niemela	Federal: Entering ... in a Restricted Building or Grounds; Disorderly ... in a Restricted Building or Grounds; Disorderly Conduct in a Capitol Building; Parading ... in a Capitol Building	Niemela pleaded Not Guilty to all charges. Found Guilty on all charges in a Jury trial on 1/26/2023.	Sentenced on 6/8/2023 to 11 months incarceration; 12 months supervised release; special assessment of $70; $1,000 fine; $500 in restitution.	Niemela received a full pardon on January 20, 2025
November 11, 2021	Gregory Lamar Nix	Federal: Engaging in physical violence in a restricted building or grounds; civil disorder; Assaulting ... certain officers with a dangerous weapon; and other counts.	Guilty – Assaulting ... certain officers	3.5 years in prison (42 months), 2 years supervised release, $2000 restitution	
August 15, 2024	Derek Noftsger	Federal: Civil Disorder; Assaulting ... Certain Officers Using a Dangerous Weapon; Entering ... in a Restricted Building or Grounds; Disorderly ... in a Restricted Building or Grounds; Engaging in Physical Violence in a Restricted Building or Grounds; Disorderly Conduct in a Capitol Building; Act of Physical Violence in the Capitol Grounds or Buildings		On 2/24/2025, the court grants the government's motion to dismiss the case with prejudice.	
June 18, 2024	Rachel Nohle	Federal: Entering ... in a Restricted Building or Grounds; Disorderly ... in a Restricted Building or Grounds; Disorderly Conduct in a Capitol Building; Parading ... in a Capitol Building	Nohle pleaded Not Guilty to all charges.	On 1/22/2025, the court grants the government's motion to dismiss the case with prejudice.	
April 05, 2023	Anthony Nolf	Federal: Civil Disorder; Entering ... in a Restricted Building or Grounds; Disorderly ... in a Restricted Building or Grounds	Nolf pleaded Guilty to one charge: Civil Disorder. The other charges are dismissed.	Sentenced on 6/14/2024 to 3 months incarceration; 36 months of supervised release; $100 special assessment; restitution of $2,000; 150 days location monitoring.	Nolf received a full pardon on January 20, 2025
February 03, 2021	Ethan Nordean	Federal: Seditious Conspiracy; Conspiracy to Obstruct Official Proceeding; Obstruction of an Official Proceeding and Aiding and Abetting; Conspiracy to Prevent an Officer from Discharging Any Duties; Civil Disorder and Aiding and Abetting; Destruction of Government Property and Aiding and Abetting (2 counts); Assaulting ... Certain Officers (2 counts)	Nordean pleaded Not Guilty to all charges. Jury selection began 12/19/2022. On 5/4/2023, the Jury found Nordean Guilty on six charges: Seditious Conspiracy; Conspiracy to Obstruct an Official Proceeding; Obstruction of an Official Proceeding and Aiding and Abetting; Conspiracy to Prevent an Officer from Discharging any Duties; Civil Disorder; Destruction of Government Property (fence). Not Guilty on one charge: Assaulting ... Certain Officers. No verdict on two charges: Destruction of Gov't Property (window); Assaulting ... Certain Officers.	Sentenced on 9/1/2023 to 18 years incarceration; 36 months supervised release; $600 special assessment. A proclamation commutes the sentence to time served as of January 20, 2025	
February 25, 2021	William Robert Norwood III	Federal: Civil Disorder; Theft of Government Property: Entering ... in a Restricted Building or Grounds; Disorderly ... in a Restricted Building or Grounds; Entering ... in Certain Rooms in the Capitol Building; Disorderly Conduct in a Capitol Building: Parading ... in a Capitol Building	Norwood pleaded Guilty to one charge: Civil Disorder.	Sentencing set for 2/21/2025. On 1/21/2025, the court grants the government's motion to dismiss the case with prejudice.	
May 03, 2024	Clay Norris	Federal: Civil Disorder; Assaulting ... Certain Officers; Entering ... in a Restricted Building or Grounds; Disorderly ... in a Restricted Building or Grounds; Engaging in Physical Violence in a Restricted Building or Grounds; Act of Physical Violence in the Capitol Grounds or Buildings	Norris pleaded Guilty to one charge: Assaulting ... Certain Officers.	Sentencing set for 5/1/2025. On 1/22/2025, the court grants the government's motion to dismiss the case with prejudice.	
July 31, 2024	Paul Marvin Nowell	Federal: Assaulting ... Certain Officers		On 1/22/2025, the court grants the government's motion to dismiss the case with prejudice	
April 19, 2024	Nathaniel Noyce	Federal: Civil Disorder; Assaulting ... Certain Officers; Entering ... in a Restricted Building or Grounds; Disorderly ... in a Restricted Building or Grounds; Engaging In Physical Violence in a Restricted Building or Grounds; Disorderly Conduct in a Capitol Building; Act of Physical Violence in the Capitol Grounds or Buildings; Parading, Demonstrating. or Picketing in a Capitol Building or Grounds	Noyce pleaded Not Guilty to all charges.	On 1/21/2025, the court grants the government's motion to dismiss the case with prejudice.	
August 18, 2021	Kelly O'Brien	Federal: Entering ... in a Restricted Building; Disorderly ... in a Restricted Building; Violent Entry and Disorderly Conduct in a Capitol Building; Parading ... in a Capitol Building	O'Brien pleaded Guilty to one charge: Entering ... in a Restricted Building. The other charges are dismissed.	Sentenced on 4/6/2022 to 90 days incarceration, 12 months Supervised Release, a Fine in the amount of $1000, $500 Restitution, and a $25 Special Assessment.	O'Brien received a full pardon on January 20, 2025
January 05, 2023	Patrick William O'Brien	Federal: Entering ... in a Restricted Building or Grounds; Disorderly ... in a Restricted Building or Grounds; Disorderly Conduct in a Capitol Building or Grounds; Parading ... in a Capitol Building	O'Brien pleaded Guilty to one charge: Parading ... in a Capitol Building. The other charges are dismissed.	Sentenced on 2/2/2024 to 90 days location monitoring; 36 months Probation; $500 Restitution and $10 Special Assessment; 100 hours of community service.	O'Brien received a full pardon on January 20, 2025
April 25, 2024	Scott Alan O'Brien	Federal: Disorderly Conduct in a Capitol Building or Grounds; Parading ... in a Capitol Building	O'Brien pleaded Guilty to both charges.	Sentenced on 6/11/2024 to 24 Months of Probation; Special Assessment of $20; Fine in the amount of $1,000; Restitution in the amount of $500; 60 hours of community service.	O'Brien received a full pardon on January 20, 2025
December 19, 2024	Joel Linn O'Donnell	Federal: Obstruction of Law Enforcement during Civil Disorder; Assaulting ... Certain Officers with a Deadly or Dangerous Weapon; Assaulting ... Certain Officers (2 counts); Entering ... in a Restricted building or Grounds with a Deadly or Dangerous Weapon; Disorderly ... in a Restricted Building or Grounds with a Deadly or Dangerous Weapon; Engaging in Physical Violence in a Restricted Building or Grounds with a Deadly or Dangerous Weapon; Disorderly Conduct in a Capitol Building; Act of Physical Violence in the Capitol Grounds or Buildings	O'Donnell pleaded Not Guilty to all charges.	On 1/21/2025, the court grants the government's motion to dismiss the case with prejudice.	
October 20, 2022	John O'Kelly	Federal: Assaulting ... Certain Officers; Civil Disorder; Entering ... in a Restricted Building or Grounds; Disorderly ... in a Restricted Building or Grounds; Engaging in Physical Violence in a Restricted Building or Grounds; Act of Physical Violence in the Capitol Grounds or Buildings	O'Kelly pleaded Not Guilty to all charges.	On 1/22/2025, the court grants the government's motion to dismiss the case with prejudice	
June 30, 2021	Timothy Earl O'Malley	Federal: Entering ... in a Restricted Building or Grounds; Disorderly ... in a Restricted Building or Grounds; Disorderly Conduct in a Capitol Building; Parading ... in a Capitol Building	O'Malley pleaded Guilty to one charge: Parading ... in a Capitol Building. The other charges are dismissed.	Sentenced 4/12/2022 to 2 years of Probation; 20 hours of community service; $500 restitution; $10 special assessment.	O'Malley received a full pardon on January 20, 2025
June 13, 2023	Adam Ryan Obest	Federal: Civil Disorder; Assaulting ... Certain Officers (2 counts); Assaulting ... Certain Officers Using a Dangerous Weapon; Entering ... in a Restricted Building or Grounds with a Deadly or Dangerous Weapon; Disorderly ... in a Restricted Building or Grounds with a Deadly or Dangerous Weapon; Engaging in Physical Violence in a Restricted Building or Grounds with a Deadly or Dangerous Weapon; Act of Physical Violence in the Capitol Grounds or Buildings	Obest pleaded Not Guilty to all charges. Bench trial verdict on 8/2/2024 found him Guilty on three charges: Civil Disorder; Assaulting ... Certain Officers; Act of Physical Violence in the Capitol Grounds or Buildings. Also Guilty on three lesser charges: Entering ... in a Restricted Building or Grounds; Disorderly ... in a Restricted Building or Grounds; Engaging in Physical Violence in a Restricted Building or Grounds. Found Not Guilty on two charges: Assaulting ... Certain Officers; Assaulting ... Certain Officers Using a Dangerous Weapon.	Sentenced on 12/13/2024 to 18 months incarceration; 36 months of supervised release; special assessment of $285; restitution of $2,000.	Obest received a full pardon on January 20, 2025
January 7, 2021	Nicholas Ochs	Federal: Conspiracy; Obstruction of an Official Proceeding; Destruction of Government Property; Theft of Government Property; Unlawfully and Knowingly Enter Restricted Building or Grounds; Disorderly ... Restricted Building or Grounds; Engaging in Physical Violence in a Restricted Buildings or Grounds	Not Guilty – all charges	4 years in prison	The leader of a Proud Boys group in Hawaii.
December 20, 2023	Spencer Offman	Federal: Entering ... in a Restricted Building or Grounds; Disorderly ... in a Restricted Building or Grounds; Disorderly Conduct in a Capitol Building or Grounds; Parading ... in a Capitol Building	Offman pleaded Guilty to one charge: Entering ... in a Restricted Building or Grounds. The other charges are dismissed.	Sentenced on 7/12/2024 to 30 days incarceration; 6 months of Supervised Release; $25 Special Assessment; $500 Restitution; 60 hours of community service.	Offman received a full pardon on January 20, 2025
January 23, 2024	Andy Steven Oliva-Lopez	Federal: Assaulting ... Certain Officers	Oliva-Lopez pleaded Guilty to the single charge.	Sentenced on 1/17/2025 to 51 months incarceration; 36 months Supervised Release with special conditions; Restitution of $2,000; Special Assessment of $100.	Oliva-Lopez received a full pardon on January 20, 2025
June 03, 2024	Eric Oliver	Federal: Entering ... in a Restricted Building or Grounds; Disorderly ... in a Restricted Building or Grounds; Disorderly Conduct in a Capitol Building; Parading ... in a Capitol Building	Oliver pleaded Guilty to two charges: Disorderly Conduct in a Capitol Building; Parading ... in a Capitol Building.	Sentencing set for 1/24/2025. On 1/22/2025, the court ordered that the case is dismissed without prejudice.	
December 09, 2021	Michael Oliveras	Federal: Civil Disorder; Obstruction of an Official Proceeding and Aiding and Abetting; Assaulting ... Certain Officers; Entering ... in a Restricted Building or Grounds; Disorderly ... in a Restricted Building or Grounds; Disorderly Conduct in a Capitol Building; Parading ... in a Capitol Building	Oliveras pleaded Guilty on 1/27/2023 to one charge: Assaulting ... Certain Officers. He withdrew his Guilty plea on 8/15/2023 and pleaded Not Guilty to a superseding indictment. In a Jury trial on 11/16/2023, he was found Guilty on all charges. On 9/30/2024, the court dismissed the Obstruction charge.	Sentenced on 10/3/2024 to 60 Months Incarceration; Supervised Release (With Conditions) of 36 Months; Restitution of $2,000; special Assessment of $270.	Oliveras received a full pardon on January 20, 2025
July 19, 2023	Stephen Alexander Ondulich	Federal: Entering ... in a Restricted Building or Grounds; Disorderly ... in a Restricted Building or Grounds; Disorderly Conduct in a Capitol Building or Grounds; Parading ... in a Capitol Building	Ondulich pleaded Guilty to two charges: Disorderly ... in a Restricted Building and Grounds; and Parading ... in a Capitol Building. The other charges are dismissed.	Sentenced on 5/20/2024 to 36 months of probation; 45 days of Home Detention; Restitution of $500; fine of $1,000; special assessment of $20; 60 hours of community service.	Ondulich received a full pardon on January 20, 2025
March 17, 2021	Michael Orangias	Federal: Entering ... in a Restricted Building or Grounds; Disorderly ... in a Restricted Building or Grounds; Disorderly Conduct in a Capitol Building; Parading ... in a Capitol Building	Orangias pleaded Guilty to one charge: Parading ... in a Capitol Building. The other charges were dismissed.	Sentenced 3/17/2022 to 36 months probation; 90 days home detention/location monitoring; $500 restitution; $10 special assessment.	Orangias received a full pardon on January 20, 2025
November 29, 2023	Ryan Joseph Orlando	Federal: Theft of Government Property; Entering ... in a Restricted Building or Grounds; Disorderly ... in a Restricted Building or Grounds; Enter or Remain on the Floor of a House of Congress without Authorization; Disorderly Conduct in a Capitol Building; Parading ... in a Capitol Building	Orlando pleaded Guilty to one charge: Entering ... in a Restricted Building or Grounds.	Sentencing set for 2/14/2025. On 1/23/2025, the court grants the government's motion to dismiss the case with prejudice.	
November 14, 2023	Paul Orta, Jr.	Federal: Civil Disorder	Orta pleaded Guilty to the charge.	Sentenced on 10/7/2024 to 6 months incarceration; 12 months Supervised Release; $100 Special Assessment;. $2,000 in restitution .	Orta received a full pardon on January 20, 2025
January 27, 2021	Christopher W. Ortiz	Federal: Entering ... in a Restricted Building or Grounds; Disorderly ... in a Restricted Building or Grounds; Disorderly Conduct in a Capitol Building; Parading ... in a Capitol Building	Ortiz pleaded Guilty to one charge: Parading ... in a Capitol Building. The other charges are dismissed.	Sentenced on 8/9/2022 to 12 months of Probation; 60 days location monitoring/home confinement; Special Assessment of $10; Restitution of $500; 100 hours community service.	Ortiz received a full pardon on January 20, 2025
March 08, 2024	Nicholas Juston Ortt	Federal: Assaulting, Resisting, Impeding Certain Officers	Ortt pleaded Guilty to the charge.	Sentenced on 9/23/2024 to 27 months incarceration; 36 months of supervised release; $2,000 in restitution; $100 special assessment.	Ortt received a full pardon on January 20, 2025
February 22, 2024	Thomas Paul Osborne	Federal: Civil Disorder; Entering ... in a Restricted Building or Grounds; Disorderly ... in a Restricted Building or Grounds; Disorderly Conduct in a Capitol Building	Osborne pleaded Not Guilty to all charges. Found Guilty on all charges in a Jury trial on 12/5/2024.	Sentencing set for 3/18/2025. On 1/21/2025, the court grants the government's motion to dismiss the case with prejudice.	
May 30, 2024	Stephen Oseen	Federal: Entering or Remaining in a Restricted Building or Grounds; Disorderly or Disruptive Conduct in a Restricted Building or Grounds; Disorderly Conduct in a Capitol Building; Parading ... in a Capitol Building	Oseen pleaded Not Guilty to all charges.	On 1/21/2025, the court grants the government's motion to dismiss the case with prejudice.	
April 01, 2021	Grady Douglas Owens	Federal: Civil Disorder; Assaulting ... Certain Officers Using a Dangerous Weapon, Inflicting Bodily Injury; Entering ... in a Restricted Building or Grounds with a Deadly or Dangerous Weapon, Resulting in Significant Bodily Injury; Disorderly ... in a Restricted Building or Grounds, Using and Carrying a Dangerous Weapon, Resulting in Significant Bodily Injury; Engaging in Physical Violence in a Restricted Building or Grounds, Using and Carrying a Dangerous Weapon, Resulting in Significant Bodily Injury; Disorderly Conduct in a Capitol Building; Act of Physical Violence in the Capitol Grounds or Buildings	Owens pleaded Guilty to two charges, one a lesser version of the original: Assaulting ... Certain Officers and Disorderly Conduct in a Capitol Building. The other charges are dismissed.	Sentenced on 6/23/2023 to 37 months incarceration; 24 months of supervised release; special assessment of $110; fine of $1,000 and restitution of $2,000.	Owens received a full pardon on January 20, 2025
October 27, 2023	Jared Luther Owens	Federal: Civil Disorder; Assaulting ... Certain Officers Using a Dangerous Weapon, Inflicting Bodily Injury, and Aiding and Abetting; Entering ... in a Restricted Building or Grounds; Disorderly ... in a Restricted Building or Grounds; Engaging in Physical Violence in a Restricted Building or Grounds; Disorderly Conduct in a Capitol Building; Act of Physical Violence in the Capitol Grounds Buildings; Parading ... in a Capitol Building	Owens pleaded Not Guilty to all charges.	Jury trial set for 4/14/2025. On 1/21/2025, the court grants the government's motion to dismiss the case with prejudice	
April 16, 2021	Jason Douglas Owens	Federal: Civil Disorder; Assaulting ... Certain Officers; Entering ... in a Restricted Building or Grounds; Disorderly ... in a Restricted Building or Grounds; Engaging in Physical Violence in a Restricted Building or Grounds; Disorderly Conduct in a Capitol Building; Act of Physical Violence in the Capitol Grounds or Buildings	Owens pleaded Guilty to one charge: Assaulting ... Certain Officers. The other charges are dismissed.	Sentenced on 6/23/2023 to 24 months incarceration; 36 months of supervised release; special assessment of $100; a fine of $2000; restitution of $2,000.	Owens received a full pardon on January 20, 2025
July 17, 2023	Angelo Jude Pacheco	Federal: Entering or Remaining in a Restricted Building or Grounds; Disorderly ... in a Restricted Building or Grounds; Disorderly Conduct in a Capitol Building; Parading ... in a Capitol Building .	Pacheco pleaded Guilty to one charge: Parading ... in a Capitol Building.	Sentenced on 1/30/2024 to 24 months Probation with 30 days of Home Detention; $500 Restitution; $10 Special Assessment; 60 hours of community service.	Pacheco received a full pardon on January 20, 2025
January 13, 2021	Robert Keith Packer	Federal: Entering ... Restricted Building; Violent Entry and Disorderly Conduct and Parading ... in a Capitol Building	Not Guilty – all charges	75 days’ incarceration, $500 restitution	56-year-old man was arrested in Newport News, Virginia. He had been photographed in a sweatshirt with the anti-Semitic words "Camp Auschwitz", a "death's head" insignia, and the slogan "work sets you free", a phrase notoriously placed at the entrances of a number of Nazi concentration camps. He has been described as a long-time extremist who wore the sweatshirt regularly. Footage of him caused worldwide outrage, as the shirt he was wearing was the most overt sign of antisemitism seen inside the Capitol during the riot. The International Auschwitz Committee, and survivors of the Auschwitz concentration camp around the world, welcomed the arrest; Christoph Heubner, the committee's executive director, said that in recent days the man had become the symbol of a political subculture "that glorifies Auschwitz ever more openly and aggressively and propagates the repetition of Auschwitz." On September 5, 2025, Packer was arrested and charged in connection with an animal attack in Virginia.
November 25, 2024	John William Padgett	Federal: Assaulting ... Certain Officers; Assaulting ... Certain Officers Using a Dangerous Weapon; Civil Disorder; Entering ... in a Restricted Building or Grounds with a Deadly or Dangerous Weapon; Disorderly ... in a Restricted Building or Grounds with a Deadly or Dangerous Weapon; Engaging in Physical Violence in a Restricted Building or Grounds with a Deadly or Dangerous Weapon; Disorderly Conduct in a Capitol Building; Act of Physical Violence in the Capitol Grounds or Buildings		On 1/21/2025, the court grants the government's motion to dismiss the case with prejudice.	
February 23, 2021	Joseph Lino Padilla	Federal: Assaulting ... Certain Officers; Civil Disorder; Assaulting ... Certain Officers Using a Dangerous Weapon; Obstruction of an Official Proceeding; Entering ... in a Restricted Building or Grounds with a Deadly or Dangerous Weapon; Disorderly ... in a Restricted Building or Grounds with a Deadly or Dangerous Weapon; Engaging in Physical Violence in a Restricted Building or Grounds with a Deadly or Dangerous Weapon; Disorderly Conduct in the Capitol Grounds or Buildings; Act of Physical Violence in the Capitol Grounds or Buildings	Padilla pleaded Not Guilty to all charges. Found Guilty on 5/3/2023 in a Bench trial on all charges except one: Civil Disorder. That charge is dismissed.	Sentenced on 9/13/2023 to 78 months incarceration with credit for time served; 24 months of supervised release; Special assessment of $820; Restitution of $2,000. Padilla received a full pardon on January 20, 2025, and the court dismissed his superseding indictment with prejudice.	
May 12, 2021	Hunter Palm	Federal: Obstruction of an Official Proceeding; Entering ... in a Restricted Building or Grounds; Disorderly ... in a Restricted Building or Grounds; Entering ... in Certain Rooms in the Capitol Building; Disorderly Conduct in a Capitol Building; Parading ... in a Capitol Building	Palm pleaded Guilty to one charge: Disorderly ... in a Restricted Building or Grounds. The other charges are dismissed.	Sentenced on 1/4/2024 to 36 Months Probation; 45 days location monitoring; 100 hours of community service; $500 Restitution; $25 Special Assessment.	Palm received a full pardon on January 20, 2025
March 17, 2021	Robert Scott Palmer	Federal: Civil Disorder; Assaulting ... Certain Officers Using a Dangerous Weapon; Assaulting ... Certain Officers Using a Dangerous Weapon, Inflicting Bodily Injury; Entering ... in a Restricted Building or Grounds with a Deadly or Dangerous Weapon; Disorderly ... in a Restricted Building or Grounds with a Deadly or Dangerous Weapon; Engaging in Physical Violence in a Restricted Building or Grounds with a Deadly or Dangerous Weapon; Disorderly Conduct in a Capitol Building; Act of Physical Violence in the Capitol Grounds or Buildings	Palmer pleaded Guilty to one charge: Assaulting ... Certain Officers Using a Dangerous Weapon, Inflicting Bodily Injury. The other charges are dismissed.	Sentenced 12/17/2021 to 63 months in prison, three years of supervised release, special Assessment of $100; and $2,000 in restitution.	Palmer received a full pardon on January 20, 2025
December 02, 2021	Marcos Panayiotou	Federal: Entering ... in a Restricted Building or Grounds; Disorderly ... in a Restricted Building or Grounds; Disorderly Conduct in a Capitol Building; Parading ... in a Capitol Building	Panayiotou pleaded Guilty to Parading ... in a Capitol Building. The other charges are dismissed.	Sentenced 11/29/2022 to 14 days of intermittent incarceration, 36 months of probation, $1,500 fine, $500 restitution, $10 special assessment.	Panayiotou received a full pardon on January 20, 2025
February 18, 2021	Bennie Alvin Parker	Federal: Conspiracy to Obstruct an Official Proceeding; Obstruction of an Official Proceeding and Aiding and Abetting; Conspiracy to Prevent an Officer from Discharging Any Duties; Entering ... in a Restricted Building or Grounds	Parker pleaded Not Guilty to all charges. Jury trial verdict on 3/21/2023 finds Parker Guilty on two counts: Conspiracy to Obstruct an Official Proceeding and Entering ... in a Restricted Building or Grounds. Found Not Guilty on the other two counts.	Sentenced on 9/1/2023 to 60 months of probation, the first 6 months of probation to be served on home detention; $125 special assessment; $1,000 restitution.	Parker received a full pardon on January 20, 2025
February 18, 2021	Sandra Ruth Parker	Federal: Conspiracy to Obstruct an Official Proceeding; Obstruction of an Official Proceeding and Aiding and Abetting; Conspiracy to Prevent an Officer from Discharging Any Duties; Destruction of Government Property and Aiding and Abetting; Entering ... in a Restricted Building or Grounds; Civil Disorder and Aiding and Abetting	Parker pleaded Not Guilty to all charges. Jury trial verdict on 3/20/2023 finds Parker Guilty on all counts.	Sentenced on 9/1/2023 to 60 months of probation, the first 12 months shall be served on home detention; $525 special assessment; $1,000 restitution; 250 hours of community service.	Parker received a full pardon on January 20, 2025
April 23, 2021	Jennifer Ruth Parks	Federal: Entering ... in a Restricted Building; Disorderly ... in a Restricted Building; Violent Entry and Disorderly Conduct; Parading ... in a Capitol Building	Parks pleaded Guilty to one charge: Parading ... in a Capitol Building. The other charges are dismissed.	Sentenced 12/8/2021 to 24 Months Probation; 60 hours community service; Restitution of $500; Special Assessment of $10.	Parks received a full pardon on January 20, 2025
June 03, 2021	Stewart Parks	Federal: Entering ... in a Restricted Building or Grounds; Disorderly ... in a Restricted Building or Grounds; Disorderly Conduct in a Capitol Building; Parading ... in a Capitol Building; Theft of Government Property	Parks pleaded Not Guilty to all charges. Bench trial held 5/1/-5/3/2023. Parks was found Guilty on all charges.	Sentenced on 11/15/2023 to 8 months incarceration; 12 months supervised release; $95 special assessment.	Parks received a full pardon on January 20, 2025
November 15, 2023	Joshua Scott Parmenter	Federal: Entering ... in a Restricted Building or Grounds; Disorderly ... in a Restricted Building or Grounds; Disorderly Conduct in a Capitol Building or Grounds; Parading ... in a Capitol Building	Parmenter pleaded Guilty to two charges: Disorderly Conduct in a Capitol Building or Grounds; Parading ... in a Capitol Building. The other charges are dismissed.	Sentenced on 7/23/2024 to 5 days incarceration; 12 months Probation; $20 Special Assessment; Restitution of $500; 100 hours of community service.	Parmenter received a full pardon on January 20, 2025
April 26, 2023	Joseph Martin Pastucci	Federal: Obstruction of an Official Proceeding; Civil Disorder; Assaulting ... Certain Officers; Entering ... in a Restricted Building or Grounds; Disorderly ... in a Restricted Building or Grounds; Engaging in Physical Violence in a Restricted Building or Grounds; Entering ... on the Floor of Congress; Entering ... in Certain Rooms in the Capitol Building; Disorderly Conduct in a Capitol Building; Act of Physical Violence in the Capitol Grounds or Buildings; Parading. Demonstrating, or Picketing in a Capitol Building	Pastucci pleaded Not Guilty to all charges. Found Guilty in a Stipulated Bench trial on 4/26/2024 on all charges but one: Parading ... in a Capitol Building. On 9/30/2024, the court vacated the Guilty Verdict as to all counts. Pastucci pleaded Guilty to one charge: Assaulting ... Certain Officers.	Sentenced on 12/20/2024 to 26 Months Incarceration; Supervised Release Of 36 Months (With Conditions); Restitution Of $2,000; Special Assessment Of $100.	Pastucci received a full pardon on January 20, 2025
September 11, 2024	Blake Patterson	Federal: Entering or Remaining in a Restricted Building or Grounds; Disorderly or Disruptive Conduct in a Restricted Building or Grounds; Disorderly Conduct in a Capitol Building; Parading ... in a Capitol Building		On 1/22/2025, the court grants the government's motion to dismiss the case with prejudice.	
January 31, 2023	Joseph Pavlik	Federal: Civil Disorder; Entering ... in a Restricted Building or Grounds with a Deadly or Dangerous Weapon; Disorderly ... in a Restricted Building or Grounds with a Deadly or Dangerous Weapon; Engaging in Physical Violence in a Restricted Building or Grounds with a Deadly or Dangerous Weapon; Impeding Passage Through the Capitol Grounds or Buildings	Pavlik pleaded Guilty to two charges: Civil Disorder; Entering ... in a Restricted Building or Grounds with a Deadly or Dangerous Weapon. The other charges are dismissed.	Sentenced on 12/1/2023 to 2 months incarceration; 6 months of home confinement; 24 months of supervised release; a $6,000 fine; $2,000 in restitution; Special Assessment of $200.	Pavlik received a full pardon on January 20, 2025
April 14, 2023	Christopher Pearce	Federal: Entering ... in a Restricted Building or Grounds; Disorderly ... in a Restricted Building or Grounds; Disorderly Conduct in a Capitol Building; Parading ... in a Capitol Building	Pearce pleaded Guilty to one charge: Parading ... in a Capitol Building. The other charges are dismissed.	Sentenced on 2/2/2024 to 36 months probation; 45 days location monitoring; 60 hours of community service; $500 restitution; $10 special assessment.	Pearce received a full pardon on January 20, 2025
October 24, 2024	Zachary Pearlman	Federal: Civil Disorder; Assaulting, Impeding, or Resisting Certain Officers; Entering ... in a Restricted Building or Grounds; Disorderly ... in a Restricted Building or Grounds; Disorderly Conduct in a Capitol Building; Parading ... in a Capitol Building	Pearlman pleaded Not Guilty to all charges.	On 1/21/2025, the court grants the government's motion to dismiss the case with prejudice.	
September 13, 2023	Donald Pearston	Federal: Entering ... in a Restricted Building or Grounds; Disorderly ... in a Restricted Building or Grounds; Disorderly Conduct on Capital Grounds; Parading ... in Capitol Building	Pearston pleaded Guilty to two charges: Disorderly Conduct on Capital Grounds; Parading ... in Capitol Building. The other charges are dismissed.	Sentenced on 4/25/2024 to 10 days incarceration; 9 months Probation; $1,000 Fine; Special Assessment of $20; Restitution in the amount of $500.	Pearston received a full pardon on January 20, 2025
April 22, 2021	Willard Jake Peart	Federal: Parading ... in a Capitol Building	Peart pleaded Guilty to the charge.	Sentenced on 4/2/2022 to 36 months of Probation; 60 days home detention with electronic monitoring; 240 hours of community service; Special Assessment of $10; Restitution of $500; Fine of $500.	Peart received a full pardon on January 20, 2025
August 07, 2024	Gregory Charles Peck, Jr.	Federal: Civil Disorder; Assaulting ... Certain Officers (2 counts); Assaulting ... Certain Officers Using a Deadly or Dangerous Weapon; Entering ... in a Restricted Building or Grounds with a Deadly or Dangerous Weapon; Disorderly ... in a Restricted Building or Grounds with a Deadly or Dangerous Weapon; Engaging in Physical Violence in a Restricted Building or Grounds with a Deadly or Dangerous Weapon; Disorderly Conduct in a Capitol Building; Act of Physical Violence in the Capitol Grounds or Buildings	Peck pleaded Not Guilty to all charges.	On 1/22/2025, the court grants the government's motion to dismiss the case with prejudice	
May 26, 2023	Brandon Scott Peery	Federal: Entering ... in a Restricted Building or Grounds; Disorderly ... in a Restricted Building or Grounds; Disorderly Conduct in a Capitol Building; Parading ... in a Capitol Building	Peery pleaded Guilty to one charge: Entering ... in a Restricted Building or Grounds.	Sentenced on 4/17/2024 to 36 months of probation; $500 restitution; $25 special assessment.	Peery received a full pardon on January 20, 2025
April 14, 2023	Nathan Donald Pelham	Federal: Entering ... in a Restricted Building or Grounds; Disorderly ... in a Restricted Building or Grounds; Disorderly Conduct in a Capitol Building; Parading ... in a Capitol Building	Pelham pleaded Guilty to one charge: Parading ... in a Capitol Building. The other charges are dismissed.	Sentenced on 9/13/2023 to credit for time served; $10 special assessment; $500 restitution.	Pelham received a full pardon on January 20, 2025
	William Joseph Pepe	Federal: Conspiracy; Assaulting ... Certain Officers; Civil Disorder; Destruction of Government Property and Aiding and Abetting; Entering ... Restricted Building or Grounds; Disorderly Conduct in a Restricted Building or Grounds and Aiding and Abetting	Not Guilty – all charges		31-year-old Proud Boys member from Beacon, New York, indicted on January 29, 2021.
June 30, 2021	Michael Steven Perkins	Federal: Civil Disorder; Assaulting ... Certain Officers Using a Dangerous Weapon; Entering ... in a Restricted Building or Grounds with a Deadly or Dangerous Weapon; Disorderly ... in a Restricted Building or Grounds with a Deadly or Dangerous Weapon; Engaging in Physical Violence in a Restricted Building or Grounds with a Deadly or Dangerous Weapon; Act of Physical Violence in the Capitol Grounds or Buildings	Perkins pleaded Not Guilty to all charges. Found Guilty on all charges in a Bench trial concluded on 3/15/2023.	Sentenced on 8/17/2023 to 48 Months of Incarceration; 36 Months of Supervised Release; Special assessment of $510.	Perkins received a full pardon on January 20, 2025
January 19, 2021	Matthew Perna	Federal: Obstruction of an Official Proceeding and Aiding and Abetting; Entering ... in a Restricted Building or Grounds; Disorderly ... in a Restricted Building or Grounds; Disorderly Conduct in a Capitol Building			Perna pleaded Guilty to all charges. The Mercer County Coroner's office confirmed that Perna committed suicide at his residence on Feb. 25, 2022.The prosecution of Perna is ABATED due to his death.
June 23, 2021	Nicholas J. Perretta	Federal: Parading ... in a Capitol Building	Perretta pleaded Guilty to the single charge.	Sentenced 1/5/2022 to 30 days incarceration; special Assessment of $10.00 and Restitution of $500.	Perretta received a full pardon on January 20, 2025
March 21, 2024	Justin Daniel Perrou	Federal: Assaulting ... Certain Officers Using a Deadly or Dangerous Weapon; Obstruction of Law Enforcement during Civil Disorder; Entering ... in a Restricted Building or Grounds with a Deadly or Dangerous Weapon; Disorderly or Disruptive Conduct in a Restricted Building or Grounds with a Deadly or Dangerous Weapon; Engaging in Physical Violence in a Restricted Building or Grounds with a Deadly or Dangerous Weapon; Disorderly or Disruptive Conduct in the Capitol Grounds or Buildings; Act of Physical Violence in the Capitol Grounds or Buildings		On 1/22/2025, the court grants the government's motion to dismiss the case with prejudice.	
May 17, 2021	Kerry Wayne Persick	Federal: Knowingly Entering ... Restricted Building or Grounds Without Lawful Authority; Disorderly ... Restricted Building or Grounds; Violent Entry or Disorderly Conduct; Parading ... in a Capitol Building	Persick pleaded Guilty to one charge: Parading ... in a Capitol Building. The other charges are dismissed.	Sentenced 36 months of probation including 90 days of home detention, a $5,000 fine, and $500 in restitution for Parading .... Other charges were dismissed.	Persick received a full pardon on January 20, 2025
January 26, 2021	Rachael Lynn Pert	Federal: Obstruction of an Official Proceeding; Entering ... in a Restricted Building or Grounds; Disorderly ... in a Restricted Building or Grounds; Disorderly Conduct in a Capitol Building; Parading ... in a Capitol Building	Pert pleaded Guilty to one charge: Entering ... in a Restricted Building or Grounds. The other charges are dismissed.	Sentenced 12/20/2021 to 24 Months Probation; 100 hours community service; $25.00 Special Assessment; $500 restitution.	Pert received a full pardon on January 20, 2025
August 06, 2024	Eric Lee Peterson	Federal: Entering ... in a Restricted Building or Grounds; Disorderly ... in a Restricted Building or Grounds; Disorderly Conduct in a Capitol Building or Grounds; Parading ... in a Capitol Building	Peterson pleaded Guilty to one charge: Entering ... in a Restricted Building or Grounds.	Sentencing set for 1/27/2025. On 1/22/2025, the court ordered that the case is dismissed without prejudice	
June 16, 2021	Kurt Peterson	Federal: Engaging in Physical Violence in a Restricted Building or Grounds with a Deadly or Dangerous Weapon	Peterson pleaded Guilty to the single charge.	Sentenced on 11/2/2023 to 45 Days of Incarceration; 60 Days of Supervised Release to be served as Home Incarceration; $4,700 of Restitution; $100 Special Assessment.	Peterson received a full pardon on January 20, 2025
February 12, 2021	Russell James Peterson	Federal: Entering ... in a Restricted Building; Disorderly ... in a Restricted Building; Violent Entry and Disorderly Conduct in a Capitol Building; Parading ... in a Capitol Building	Peterson pleaded Guilty to one charge: Parading ... in a Capitol Building. The other charges were dismissed.	Sentenced 12/1/2021 to 30 days incarceration; Special Assessment of $10; Restitution of $500.	Peterson received a full pardon on January 20, 2025
May 05, 2021	Robert Lee Petrosh Jr.	Federal: Entering ... in a Restricted Building; Disorderly ... in a Restricted Building; Violent Entry and Disorderly Conduct in a Capitol Building; Parading ... in a Capitol Building; Theft of Government Property	Petrosh pleaded Guilty to one charge: Theft of Government Property. The other charges are dismissed.	Sentenced on 3/25/2022 to 10 days in jail; 12 months supervised release; $1,000 fine; $938 restitution; $25 special assessment. Ordered to return the two microphones he took from the Speaker's lectern.	Petrosh received a full pardon on January 20, 2025
June 03, 2024	Brandon Pettit	Federal: Entering ... in a Restricted Building or Grounds; Disorderly ... in a Restricted Building or Grounds; Disorderly Conduct in a Capitol Building; Parading ... in a Capitol Building	Pettit pleaded Guilty to two charges: Disorderly Conduct in a Capitol Building; Parading ... in a Capitol Building. The other charges are dismissed.	Sentenced on 11/1/2024 to 24 Months Probation (With Conditions); Fine Of $5,000; Restitution of $500; Special Assessment Of $20.	Pettit received a full pardon on January 20, 2025
August 19, 2021	Madison Pettit	Federal: Parading ... in a Capitol Building	Pettit pleaded Guilty to the charge.	Sentenced to 18 months probation; 45 days location monitoring/home detention; 60 hours community service; $10 special assessment; $500 restitution.	Pettit received a full pardon on January 20, 2025
January 15, 2021	Dominic Pezzola	Federal: Conspiracy; Obstructing an Official Proceeding and Aiding and Abetting; Obstruction of Law Enforcement During Civil Disorder and Aiding and Abetting; Robbery of Personal Property of the United States; Assaulting ... Certain Officers; Destruction of Government Property and Aiding and Abetting; Entering ... Restricted Building or Grounds; Disorderly Conduct in a Restricted Building or Grounds and Aiding and Abetting; Obstruction of Law Enforcement during a Civil Disorder and Aiding and Abetting	Not Guilty – all charges	10 years' incarceration, 36 month's supervised release	43-year-old Proud Boys member from Rochester, New York, indicted on January 29, 2021. A widely circulated video appears to show him using a riot shield to break one of the windows in the Capitol. After the event, he allegedly stated he "would have killed anyone they got their hands on, including Speaker of the House Nancy Pelosi and Vice President Michael Pence". He had previously been seen at Proud Boys protests and is an ex-Marine. Shouted "Trump won!" after being sentenced on September 1, 2023. A proclamation commutes the sentence to time served as of January 20, 2025
January 20, 2021	Tam Dinh Pham	Federal: Entering ... in a Restricted Building; Disorderly ... in a Restricted Building; Violent Entry and Disorderly Conduct in a Capitol Building; Parading ... in a Capitol Building	Pham pleaded Guilty to one charge: Parading ... in a Capitol Building.	The other charges are dismissed. Sentenced 12/10/2021 to 45 days in jail; $500 in restitution; $10 assessment; $1,000 fine.	Was fired from his job as a Houston Police Department officer after January 6. Pham received a full pardon on January 20, 2025.
January 26, 2021	Daniel Dink Phipps	Federal: Assaulting ... Certain Officers and Physical Contact; Civil Disorder; Entering ... in a Restricted Building or Grounds; Disorderly ... in a Restricted Building or Grounds; Disorderly Conduct in a Capitol Building; Parading ... in a Capitol Building	Phipps pleaded Guilty to all charges.	Sentenced on 8/10/2023 to 27 Months of Incarceration; 36 months supervised release; special assessment of $270.	Phipps received a full pardon on January 20, 2025
October 28, 2024	Robert Piccirillo	Federal: Entering ... in a Restricted Building or Grounds; Disorderly ... in a Restricted Building or Grounds; Disorderly Conduct in a Capitol Building; Parading ... in a Capitol Building	Piccirillo pleaded Not Guilty to all charges.	On 2/24/2025, the court grants the government's motion to dismiss the case with prejudice.	
January 30, 2024	Michael Picciuto	Federal: Civil Disorder (3 counts); Assaulting ... Certain Officers; Destruction of Property within Territorial Jurisdiction; Entering ... in A Restricted Building or Grounds; Disorderly ... in a Restricted Building or Grounds; Engaging in Physical Violence in a Restricted Building or Grounds; Disorderly Conduct in a Capitol Building; Act of Physical Violence in the Capitol Grounds or Buildings; Parading ... in a Capitol Building	Picciuto pleaded Not Guilty to all charges. Bench Trial set for 2/18/2025.	On 1/21/2025, the court grants the government's motion to dismiss the case with prejudice.	
December 13, 2023	Edward Picquet, Jr.	Federal: Civil Disorder; Entering ... in a Restricted Building or Grounds; Disorderly ... in a Restricted Building or Grounds; Disorderly Conduct in a Capitol Building; Parading ... in any of the Capitol Buildings	Picquet pleaded Not Guilty to all charges.	Jury trial set for 3/31/2025. On 1/21/2025, the court grants the government's motion to dismiss the case with prejudice	
September 07, 2023	Levi Plumley	Federal: Entering ... in a Restricted Building or Grounds; Disorderly ... in a Restricted Building or Grounds; Disorderly Conduct in a Capitol Building or Grounds; Parading ... in a Capitol Building	Plumley pleaded Guilty to one charge: Entering ... in a Restricted Building or Grounds.	Sentencing is set for 2/4/2025. On 1/21/2025, the court grants the government's motion to dismiss the case with prejudice.	
January 06, 2024	Jonathan Daniel Pollock	Federal: Civil Disorder (3 counts); Assaulting ... Certain Officers Using a Dangerous Weapon (2 counts); Assaulting ... Certain Officers (5 counts); Theft of Government Property (3 counts); Entering ... in a Restricted Building or Grounds with a Deadly or Dangerous Weapon; Disorderly ... in a Restricted Building or Grounds with a Deadly or Dangerous Weapon; Engaging in Physical Violence in a Restricted Building or Grounds with a Deadly or Dangerous Weapon; Act of Physical Violence in the Capitol Grounds or Buildings	Pollock was found and arrested on 1/6/2024 in Groveland, Fla. He pleaded Not Guilty to all charges on 2/22/2024. Jury Trial reset for 2/18/2025.	On 1/22/2025, the court grants the government's motion to dismiss the case with prejudice.	
June 30, 2021	Olivia Michele Pollock	Federal: Civil Disorder; Assaulting ... Certain Officers; Entering ... in a Restricted Building or Grounds; Disorderly ... in a Restricted Building or Grounds; Engaging in Physical Violence in a Restricted Building or Grounds; Act of Physical Violence in the Capitol Grounds or Buildings; Failure to Appear	Pollock pleaded Not Guilty to all charges. Failed to appear at hearings and is declared a fugitive. Found and arrested on 1/6/2024 in Groveland, Fla. Jury Trial reset for 2/18/2025.	On 1/23/2025, the court grants the government's motion to dismiss the case with prejudice.	
May 20, 2022	Michael Pomeroy	Federal: Entering ... in a Restricted Building or Grounds; Disorderly ... in a Restricted Building or Grounds; Disorderly Conduct in a Capitol Building or Grounds; Parading ... in a Capitol Building	Pomeroy pleaded Guilty to one charge: Parading ... in a Capitol Building. The other charges are dismissed.	Sentenced on 5/8/2023 to 30 days of incarceration; Special Assessment of $10; Restitution of $500.	Pomeroy received a full pardon on January 20, 2025
March 17, 2021	Mark Ponder	Federal: Assaulting ... Certain Officers Using a Dangerous Weapon; Civil Disorder; Obstruction of an Official Proceeding; Entering ... in a Restricted Building or Grounds with a Deadly or Dangerous Weapon; Disorderly ... in a Restricted Building or Grounds with a Deadly or Dangerous Weapon; Engaging in Physical Violence in a Restricted Building or Grounds with a Deadly or Dangerous Weapon; Disorderly Conduct in Capitol Building or Grounds; Act of Physical Violence in the Capitol Grounds or Buildings	Ponder pleaded Guilty to one charge: Assaulting ... Certain Officers Using a Dangerous Weapon. The other charges are dismissed.	Sentenced 7/26/2022 to 63 months in prison; 3 years of supervised release; $2,000 restitution; special assessment of $100.	Ponder received a full pardon on January 20, 2025
February 08, 2024	Thomas Pooler, Jr.	Federal: Disorderly Conduct in a Capitol Building or Grounds; Parading ... in a Capitol Building	Pooler pleaded Guilty to both charges.	Sentenced on 3/20/2024 to 12 Months of Probation; 60 hours of community service; Special Assessment of $20; Fine in the amount of $1,000; Restitution in the amount of $500.	Pooler received a full pardon on January 20, 2025
February 12, 2021	Michael Anthony Pope	Federal: Civil Disorder; Obstruction of an Official Proceeding; Entering ... in a Restricted Building and Grounds; Disorderly ... in a Restricted Building and Grounds; Disorderly Conduct in a Capitol Building; Parading ... in a Capitol Building	Pope pleaded Guilty to two charges: Entering ... in a Restricted Building and Grounds and Parading ... in a Capitol Building. The court dismissed the Obstruction charge on 10/24/2024. Bench Trial verdict on 10/24/2024 finds him Guilty on remaining three charges: Civil Disorder, Disorderly ... in a Restricted Building; and Grounds; Disorderly Conduct in a Capitol Building.	Sentencing is set for 4/23/2025. On 1/21/2025, the court grants the government's motion to dismiss the case with prejudice	
February 12, 2021	William Alexander Pope	Federal: Civil Disorder; Obstruction of an Official Proceeding; Entering ... in a Restricted Building and Grounds; Disorderly ... in a Restricted Building and Grounds; Impeding Ingress and Egress in a Restricted Building or Grounds; Disorderly Conduct in a Capitol Building; Impeding Passage Through the Capitol Grounds or Buildings; Parading ... in a Capitol Building	Pope pleaded Not Guilty to all charges. On 9/23/2024 the court dismissed the Obstruction charge, along with counts 5 and 7.	On 1/21/2025, the court grants the government's motion to dismiss the case with prejudice.	
September 10, 2024	Alexander Cain Poplin	Federal: Civil Disorder; Assaulting Resisting, or Impeding Certain Officers Using a Dangerous Weapon; Entering ... in a Restricted Building or Grounds; Disorderly ... in a Restricted Building or Grounds; Engaging in Physical Violence in a Restricted Building or Grounds.		On 1/22/2025, the court grants the government's motion to dismiss the case with prejudice.	
January 16, 2025	James Edward Porter	Federal: Obstruction of Law Enforcement During Civil Disorder; Assaulting ... Certain Officers; Knowingly Entering or Remaining in any Restricted Building or Grounds Without Lawful Authority; Disorderly ... in a Restricted Building or Grounds; Engaging in Physical Violence in a Restricted Building or Grounds; Disorderly Conduct in a Capitol Building		On 1/21/2025, the court grants the government's motion to dismiss the case with prejudice.	
February 02, 2024	Mason Porter	Federal: Entering ... in a Restricted Building or Grounds; Disorderly ... in a Restricted Building or Grounds; Disorderly Conduct in a Capitol Building; Parading ... in a Capitol Building	Porter pleaded Guilty to two charges: Disorderly Conduct in a Capitol Building; Parading ... in a Capitol Building. The other charges are dismissed.	Sentenced on 1/8/2025 to 24 months of Probation (with conditions); Restitution in the amount of $500; $20 Special Assessment.	Porter received a full pardon on January 20, 2025
November 03, 2021	Joshua John Portlock	Federal: Civil Disorder (3 counts); Assaulting ... Certain Officers; Entering ... in a Restricted Building or Grounds; Disorderly ... in a Restricted Building or Grounds; Engaging in Physical Violence in a Restricted Building or Grounds; Act of Physical Violence in the Capitol Grounds or Buildings	Portlock pleaded Guilty to one charge: Assaulting ... Certain Officers. The other charges are dismissed.	Sentenced on 4/17/2024 to 20 Months of Incarceration; 24 Months of Supervised Release; $100 Special Assessment; Restitution of $2,000; 40 hours of community service.	Portlock received a full pardon on January 20, 2025
May 09, 2024	Gerald Powell	Federal: Civil Disorder; Entering ... in a Restricted Building or Grounds; Disorderly Conduct in a Restricted Building or Grounds; Disorderly Conduct in a Capitol Building; Parading ... in a Capitol Building	Powell pleaded Not Guilty to all charges.	Jury Trial set for 3/3/2025. On 1/27/2025, the court grants the government's motion to dismiss the case with prejudice.	
February 04, 2021	Rachel Marie Powell	Federal: Civil Disorder; Obstruction of an Official Proceeding; Destruction of Government Property; Entering ... in a Restricted Building or Grounds with a Deadly or Dangerous Weapon; Disorderly ... in a Restricted Building or Grounds with a Deadly or Dangerous Weapon; Engaging in Physical Violence in a Restricted Building or Grounds with a Deadly or Dangerous Weapon; Disorderly Conduct in a Capitol Building; Act of Physical Violence in the Capitol Grounds or Buildings; Parading ... in a Capitol Building	Powell pleaded Not Guilty to all charges. Found Guilty on 7/18/2023 on all counts in a Bench trial.	Sentenced on 10/17/2023 to 57 months incarceration; 36 months supervised release; restitution of $2,753; a fine of $5,000; special assessment of $555. On 10/28/2024, the USCA vacated the Obstruction conviction. Resentencing commenced and continued to 1/24/2025. On 1/21/2025, the court grants the government's motion to dismiss the case with prejudice	
August 06, 2024	David Pracht	Federal: Entering ... in a Restricted Building or Grounds; Disorderly ... in a Restricted Building or Grounds; Disorderly Conduct in a Capitol Building or Grounds; Parading ... in a Capitol Building	Pracht pleaded Not Guilty to all charges.	On 1/27/2025, the court grants the government's motion to dismiss the case with prejudice	
August 06, 2024	Kiera Pracht	Federal: Entering ... in a Restricted Building or Grounds; Disorderly ... in a Restricted Building or Grounds; Disorderly Conduct in a Capitol Building or Grounds; Parading ... in a Capitol Building	Pracht pleaded Not Guilty to all charges.	On 1/27/2025, the court grants the government's motion to dismiss the case with prejudice	
June 11, 2021	Nicole Prado	Federal: Entering ... in a Restricted Building; Disorderly ... in a Restricted Building; Violent Entry and Disorderly Conduct; Parading ... in a Capitol Building	Prado pleaded Guilty to one charge: Parading ... in a Capitol Building. The other charges are dismissed.	Sentenced 2/7/2022 to 12 Months of Probation; 60 days home confinement/location monitoring; Special Assessment of $10.00; Fine of $742.00; Restitution of $500.00; 60 hours of community service.	Prado received a full pardon on January 20, 2025
September 26, 2024	Christina Marie Praser-Fair	Federal: Knowingly Entering or Remaining in any Restricted Building or Grounds; Disorderly ... in a Restricted Building or Grounds; Disorderly ... in the Capitol Grounds or Buildings; Parading ... in a Capitol Building		On 1/24/2025, the court grants the government's motion to dismiss the case with prejudice.	
December 04, 2024	Charles Orlando Pratt IV	Federal: Civil Disorder; Assaulting ... Certain Officers; Entering ... in a Restricted Building or Grounds; Disorderly ... in a Restricted Building or Grounds; Engaging in Physical Violence in a Restricted Building or Grounds; Disorderly Conduct in the Capitol Grounds or Building; Act of Physical Violence in the Capitol Grounds or Buildings	Pratt pleaded Not Guilty to all charges.	On 1/27/2025, the court grants the government's motion to dismiss the case with prejudice.	
August 24, 2022	Brian Preller	Federal: Civil Disorder; Entering ... in a Restricted Building or Grounds with a Deadly or Dangerous Weapon; Disorderly ... in a Restricted Building or Grounds with a Deadly or Dangerous Weapon; Engaging in Physical Violence in a Restricted Building or Grounds with a Deadly or Dangerous Weapon; Impeding Passage Through the Capitol Grounds or Buildings	Preller pleaded Guilty to one charge: Civil Disorder. The other charges are dismissed.	Sentenced on 9/13/2023 to 60 months of probation; 8 months of location monitoring; 40 hours of community service; $100 special assessment; $2,000 restitution.	Preller received a full pardon on January 20, 2025
September 17, 2021	Brandon Prenzlin	Federal: Entering ... in a Restricted Building; Disorderly ... in a Restricted Building; Violent Entry and Disorderly Conduct in a Capitol Building; Parading ... in a Capitol Building	Prenzlin pleaded Guilty to one charge: Parading ... in a Capitol Building. The other charges are dismissed.	Sentenced on 6/27/2022 to 10 Months Probation; $10 Special Assessment; $2,500 Fine; Restitution of $500; 120 hours of community service.	Prenzlin received a full pardon on January 20, 2025
March 05, 2021	Ronnie Brian Presley	Federal: Civil Disorder; Obstruction of an Official Proceeding; Entering ... in a Restricted Building or Grounds; Disorderly ... in a Restricted Building or Grounds; Engaging in Physical Violence in a Restricted Building or Grounds; Disorderly Conduct in a Capitol Building; Impeding Passage Through the Capitol Grounds or Buildings; Parading ... in a Capitol Building	Presley pleaded Guilty to one charge: Civil Disorder. The other charges are dismissed.	Sentenced 11/30/2022 to 12 months of incarceration, 26 months of supervised release, $2,000 restitution; $100 special assessment; 100 hours of community service.	Presley received a full pardon on January 20, 2025
June 08, 2021	Shawn Price	Federal: Civil Disorder; Entering ... in a Restricted Building or Grounds; Disorderly ... in a Restricted Building or Grounds	Price pleaded Guilty to one charge: Civil Disorder.	Sentenced on 4/3/2023 to 12 months and one day of incarceration; Supervised Release of 36 Months; 60 hours of community service; Special Assessment of $100; $2,000 restitution.	Price received a full pardon on January 20, 2025
August 09, 2021	Christopher John Price	Federal: Entering ... in a Restricted Building or Grounds; Disorderly ... in a Restricted Building or Grounds; Disorderly Conduct in a Capitol Building or Grounds; Parading ... in a Capitol Building	Price pleaded Not Guilty to all charges. Found Guilty on all charges in a Bench trial held 3/21/2023.	Sentenced on 9/29/2023 to 45 days incarceration; 9 months Supervised Release; Special Assessments totaling $70; Restitution of $500.	Price received a full pardon on January 20, 2025
January 14, 2021	Christine Priola	Federal: Obstruction of an Official Proceeding	Priola pleaded Guilty to the charge: Obstruction of an Official Proceeding.	Sentenced 10/28/22 to 15 months in prison, one year of supervised release, $2,000 restitution; $100 special assessment.	Priola received a full pardon on January 20, 2025
January 07, 2021	Joshua Pruitt	Federal: Civil Disorder; Obstruction of an Official Proceeding; Destruction of Government Property; Entering ... in a Restricted Building or Grounds; Disorderly ... in a Restricted Building or Grounds; Disorderly Conduct in a Capitol Building; Act of Physical Violence in the Capitol Grounds or Buildings	Pruitt pleaded Guilty to one charge: Obstruction of an Official Proceeding. The other charges are dismissed.	Sentenced 8/29/2022 to 55 months incarceration; 3 years supervised release; $2,000 restitution; $100 special assessment.	Pruitt received a full pardon on January 20, 2025
October 04, 2021	Mahailya Pryer	Federal: Entering ... in a Restricted Building or Grounds; Disorderly ... in a Restricted Building or Grounds; Disorderly Conduct in a Capitol Building; Parading ... in a Capitol Building	Pryer pleaded Guilty to one charge: Parading ... in a Capitol Building. The other charges are dismissed.	Sentenced on 9/30/2022 to 45 days of incarceration; 36 months of Probation; Special Assessment of $10; Restitution of $500; 60 hours of community service.	Pryer received a full pardon on January 20, 2025
December 21, 2023	Curtis Pulaski	Federal: Disorderly Conduct in a Capitol Building or Grounds; Parading ... in a Capitol Building	Pulaski pleaded Guilty to both charges.	Sentenced on 7/23/2024 to 24 months of Probation with 30 days location monitoring; $20 Special Assessment; Restitution of $500; 60 hours of community service.	Pulaski received a full pardon on January 20, 2025
May 27, 2021	Anthony Michael Puma	Federal: Obstruction of an Official Proceeding; Entering ... in a Restricted Building or Grounds; Disorderly ... in a Restricted Building or Grounds; Disorderly Conduct in a Capitol Building; Parading ... in a Capitol Building	Puma pleaded Guilty to one charge: Obstruction of an Official Proceeding. The other charges are dismissed.	Sentenced on 3/21/2023 to 9 Months of Incarceration; 24 months of supervised release; Special Assessment $100; Fine $500; Restitution of $2,000.	Puma received a full pardon on January 20, 2025
November 10, 2021	Gregory Richard Purdy	Federal: Civil Disorder (3 counts); Assaulting ... Certain Officers (2 counts); Obstruction of an Official Proceeding and Aiding and Abetting; Entering ... in a Restricted Building or Grounds; Disorderly ... in a Restricted Building or Grounds; Engaging in Physical Violence in a Restricted Building or Grounds; Disorderly Conduct in a Capitol Building; Act of Physical Violence in the Capitol Grounds or Buildings; Parading ... in a Capitol Building	Purdy pleaded Not Guilty to all charges. Found Guilty on all charges in a Jury Trial on 6/11/2024. Obstruction conviction is dismissed on 1/14/2025.	Sentencing set for 1/29/2025. On 1/21/2025, the court grants the government's motion to dismiss the case with prejudice	
November 10, 2021	Matthew Purdy	Federal: Entering ... in a Restricted Building or Grounds; Disorderly ... in a Restricted Building or Grounds; Disorderly Conduct in a Capitol Building; Parading ... in a Capitol Building	Purdy pleaded Not Guilty to all charges. Found Guilty on two charges: Disorderly Conduct in a Capitol Building; Parading ... in a Capitol Building. Found Not Guilty on the other two charges.	Sentenced on 12/6/2024 to 90 days incarceration; fine of $2,000; special assessment of $20.	Purdy received a full pardon on January 20, 2025
November 30, 2023	Colby John Purkel	Federal: Civil Disorder; Entering ... in a Restricted Building or Grounds; Disorderly ... in a Restricted Building or Grounds; Disorderly Conduct in a Capitol Building or Grounds; Parading ... in a Capitol Building	Purkel pleaded Guilty to one charge: Civil Disorder. The other charges are dismissed.	Sentenced on 8/1/2024 to 21 days incarceration; 12 months of Supervised Release; $100 Special Assessment; Restitution of $2,000; 100 hours of community service.	Purkel received a full pardon on January 20, 2025
November 30, 2023	Willard John Purkel, Jr.	Federal: Civil Disorder; Entering ... in a Restricted Building or Grounds; Disorderly ... in a Restricted Building or Grounds; Disorderly Conduct in a Capitol Building or Grounds; Parading ... in a Capitol Building	Purkel, Jr. pleaded Guilty to all charges.	Sentenced on 9/12/2024 to 60 days incarceration; 9 months of Supervised Release; Special Assessment of $170; Restitution of $2,000.	Purkel, Jr. received a full pardon on January 20, 2025
July 09, 2021	Matthew Thomas Purse	Federal: Entering ... in a Restricted Building or Grounds; Disorderly ... in a Restricted Building or Grounds; Disorderly Conduct in a Capitol Building; Parading ... in a Capitol Building	Purse pleaded Not Guilty to all charges.	Jury Trial set for 4/14/2025.	On 1/22/2025, the court ordered that the case is dismissed without prejudice.
June 28, 2023	Biao Qu	Federal: Civil Disorder; Obstruction of an Official Proceeding; Assaulting ... Certain Officers; Entering ... in a Restricted Building or Grounds; Disorderly ... in a Restricted Building or Grounds; Impeding Ingress and Egress in a Restricted Building or Grounds; Disorderly Conduct in a Capitol Building; Parading ... in a Capitol Building	Qu pleaded Not Guilty to all charges.	Jury trial set for 3/31/2025. On 1/23/2025, the court grants the government's motion to dismiss the case with prejudice	
April 07, 2021	Christopher Joseph Quaglin	Federal: Assaulting ... Certain Officers (3 counts); Inflicting Bodily Injury on Certain Officers; Robbery and Aiding and Abetting (2 counts); Assaulting ... Certain Officers Using a Dangerous Weapon (2 counts); Obstruction of an Official Proceeding and Aiding and Abetting; Civil Disorder; Disorderly ... in a Restricted Building or Grounds with a Deadly or Dangerous Weapon; Engaging in Physical Violence in a Restricted Building or Grounds with a Deadly or Dangerous Weapon; Disorderly Conduct in a Capitol Building; Act of Physical Violence in the Capitol Grounds or Buildings	Quaglin pleaded Not Guilty to all charges. Found Guilty on 7/10/2023 in a stipulated Bench trial on all charges.	Sentenced on 5/24/2024 to 144 Months of Incarceration; 24 Months of Supervised Release; Special Assessment of $1,220; Restitution in the amount of $2,000.	Quaglin received a full pardon on January 20, 2025
February 12, 2021	Michael Aaron Quick	Federal: Entering ... in a Restricted Building or Grounds; Disorderly ... in a Restricted Building or Grounds; Disorderly Conduct in a Capitol Building or Grounds; Parading ... in a Capitol Building	Quick pleaded Guilty to one charge: Parading ... in a Capitol Building. The other charges are dismissed.	Sentenced 3/17/2022 to 24 months of probation, $1,000 fine, $500 restitution; $10 special assessment; 60 hours of community service.	Quick received a full pardon on January 20, 2025
February 12, 2021	Stephen Brian Quick	Federal: Entering ... in a Restricted Building or Grounds; Disorderly ... in a Restricted Building or Grounds; Disorderly Conduct in a Capitol Building or Grounds; Parading ... in a Capitol Building	Quick pleaded Guilty to one charge: Parading ... in a Capitol Building. The other charges are dismissed.	Sentenced 3/17/2022 to 24 months of probation, $1,000 fine, $500 restitution; $10 special assessment; 60 hours of community service.	Quick received a full pardon on January 20, 2025
September 26, 2024	Traci Quimby	Federal: Entering or Remaining in a Restricted Building or Grounds; Disorderly or Disruptive Conduct in a Restricted Building or Grounds; Disorderly Conduct in a Capitol Building; Parading ... in a Capitol Building	Quimby pleaded Not Guilty to all charges.	On 1/22/2025, the court grants the government's motion to dismiss the case with prejudice	
November 21, 2024	Baptiste Quinternet	Federal: Knowingly Entering or Remaining in any Restricted Building or Grounds Without Lawful Authority; Knowingly, and with intent to impede or disrupt the orderly conduct of Government business; Disorderly Conduct in a Capitol Building; Parading ... in a Capitol Building		On 1/22/2025, the court grants the government's motion to dismiss the case with prejudice.	
January 20, 2022	Kenneth Bruce Rader	Federal: Entering ... in a Restricted Building or Grounds; Disorderly ... in a Restricted Building or Grounds; Disorderly Conduct in a Capitol Building; Parading ... in a Capitol Building	Rader pleaded Guilty to one charge: Parading ... in a Capitol Building. The other charges are dismissed.	Sentenced on 9/29/2022 to 90 days incarceration; 36 months of Probation; $10 special assessment; $500 in restitution. On 4/17/2024, he was sentenced to 135 days incarceration, with credit for the 90 days served, at a probation revocation hearing.	Rader received a full pardon on January 20, 2025
March 24, 2021	Paul Rae	Federal: Obstruction of an Official Proceeding; Entering ... in a Restricted Building or Grounds; Disorderly ... in a Restricted Building or Grounds; Disorderly Conduct in a Capitol Building; Parading ... in a Capitol Building; Destruction of Government Property; Civil Disorder	Rae pleaded Guilty to two charges: Entering ... in a Restricted Building or Grounds; Civil Disorder. The other charges are dismissed.	Sentenced on 12/6/2024 to 14 months of Incarceration; 24 months of Supervised Release (with conditions); $125 Special Assessment; Restitution of $2,000.	Rae received a full pardon on January 20, 2025
February 05, 2021	James Douglas Rahm III	Federal: Civil Disorder; Entering ... in a Restricted Building or Grounds; Disorderly ... in a Restricted Building or Grounds; Disorderly Conduct in a Capitol Building; Parading ... in a Capitol Building	Rahm pleaded Guilty to one charge: Disorderly ... in a Restricted Building or Grounds. The other charges are dismissed.	Sentenced on 1/25/2024 to 45 days incarceration; 12 months of supervised release; $500 in restitution; $25 special assessment.	Rahm received a full pardon on January 20, 2025
February 05, 2021	James Douglas Rahm, Jr.	Federal: Obstruction of an Official Proceeding; Entering ... in a Restricted Building or Grounds; Disorderly ... in a Restricted Building or Grounds; Disorderly Conduct in a Capitol Building; Parading ... in a Capitol Building	Rahm pleaded Not Guilty to all charges. Found Guilty on all counts on 10/13/22 at bench trial in which both sides agreed to a set of stipulated facts.	Sentenced on 1/18/2023 to one year incarceration; three years of supervised release; $2,000 in restitution; $170 special assessment.	Rahm received a full pardon on January 20, 2025
January 13, 2022	Dion Rajewski	Federal: Civil Disorder; Entering ... in a Restricted Building or Grounds with a Deadly or Dangerous Weapon; Disorderly ... in a Restricted Building or Grounds with a Deadly or Dangerous Weapon; Engaging in Physical Violence in a Restricted Building or Grounds with a Deadly or Dangerous Weapon; Disorderly Conduct in the Capitol Building or Grounds	Rajewski pleaded Not Guilty to all charges.	Bench trial is scheduled for 2/18/2025. On 1/21/2025, the court grants the government's motion to dismiss the case with prejudice	
June 15, 2023	Karthik Ramakrishnan	Federal: Entering ... in a Restricted Building or Grounds; Disorderly ... in a Restricted Building or Grounds; Disorderly or Disruptive Conduct in the Capitol Grounds or Building; Parading ... in the Capitol Building	Ramakrishnan pleaded Guilty to one charge: Parading ... in the Capitol Building. The other charges are dismissed.	Sentenced on 12/14/2023 to 6 months of Probation; $10 Special Assessment; $500 Fine; and $500 Restitution.	Ramakrishnan received a full pardon on January 20, 2025
April 21, 2022	Barry Bennett Ramey	Federal: Civil Disorder; Assaulting ... Certain Officers Using a Dangerous Weapon (2 counts); Entering ... in a Restricted Building or Grounds with a Deadly or Dangerous Weapon; Disorderly ... in a Restricted Building or Grounds with a Deadly or Dangerous Weapon; Engaging in Physical Violence in a Restricted Building or Grounds with a Deadly or Dangerous Weapon; Act of Physical Violence in the Capitol Grounds or Buildings	Ramey pleaded Not Guilty to all charges. Bench trial held from 2/21/2023-3/3/2023. Ramey was found Guilty on all charges except two parts: using a deadly and dangerous weapon...to forcibly assault, resist, oppose, impede, intimidate, or interfere with an officer of the United States...while each was engaged in the performance of official duties; and using and carrying a deadly and dangerous weapon during and in relation to the offenses involving a restricted building or ground.	Sentenced on 7/7/2023 to 60 months of incarceration; 36 months of supervised release; $385 special assessment; restitution of $2,000.	Ramey received a full pardon on January 20, 2025
April 20, 2021	Stephen Chase Randolph	Federal: Civil Disorder; Assaulting ... Certain Officers Using a Dangerous Weapon, Inflicting Bodily Injury, and Aiding and Abetting (2 counts); Assaulting ... Certain Officers; Entering ... in a Restricted building or Grounds with a Deadly or Dangerous Weapon; Disorderly ... in a Restricted Building or Grounds with a Deadly or Dangerous Weapon; Engaging in Physical Violence in a Restricted Building or Grounds with a Deadly or Dangerous Weapon, Resulting in Significant Bodily Injury, and Aiding and Abetting; Disorderly Conduct in a Capitol Building; Act of Physical Violence in the Capitol Grounds or Buildings and Aiding and Abetting; Obstruction of an Official Proceeding and Aiding and Abetting	Randolph pleaded Not Guilty to all charges. Bench trial verdict on 2/2/2024 finds him Guilty on four charges: Civil Disorder; Assaulting ... Certain Officers Using a Dangerous Weapon, Inflicting Bodily Injury, and Aiding and Abetting; Assaulting ... Certain Officers; Act of Physical Violence in the Capitol Grounds or Buildings and Aiding and Abetting. Not Guilty on six charges. On 9/3/2024, the Court orders dismissal of the Obstruction charge.	Sentenced on 9/19/2024 to 8 years incarceration; 36 months of supervised release; $2,000 in restitution; $310 special assessment.	Randolph received a full pardon on January 20, 2025
April 02, 2024	Zach Rash	Federal: Assaulting ... Certain Officers	Rash pleaded Guilty to the charge.	Sentenced on 11/20/2024 to 27 months incarceration; 36 months supervised release; $2,000 restitution; $100 special assessment.	Rash received a full pardon on January 20, 2025
July 15, 2021	Erik Rau	Federal: Entering ... in a Restricted Building or Grounds; Disorderly ... in a Restricted Building or Grounds; Disorderly Conduct in a Capitol Building; Parading ... in a Capitol Building	Rau pleaded Guilty to one count of Disorderly Conduct in a Capitol Building. The other charges were dismissed.	Sentenced 9/29/2021 to 45 days in jail; $10 assessment; and $500 restitution.	Rau received a full pardon on January 20, 2025
March 15, 2021	Mark Roger Rebegila	Federal: Entering ... in a Restricted Building; Disorderly ... in a Restricted Building; Violent Entry and Disorderly Conduct in a Capitol Building; Parading ... in a Capitol Building	Rebegila pleaded Guilty to one charge: Parading ... in a Capitol Building. The other charges are dismissed.	Sentenced 4/20/2022 to 24 months probation including 30 days home detention; 60 hours community service; $2,000 fine; $500 restitution; $10 special assessment.	Rebegila received a full pardon on January 20, 2025
July 06, 2021	Kenneth John Reda	Federal: Entering ... in a Restricted Building or Grounds; Disorderly ... in a Restricted Building or Grounds; Disorderly Conduct in a Capitol Building; Parading ... in a Capitol Building	Reda pleaded Guilty to one charge: Parading ... in a Capitol Building. The other charges are dismissed.	Sentenced to 3 years probation; 60 days home detention/location monitoring; $500 restitution; $10 special assessment; 60 hours of community service.	Reda received a full pardon on January 20, 2025
January 17, 2021	Blake Austin Reed	Federal: Entering ... in a Restricted Building or Grounds; Disorderly ... in a Restricted Building or Grounds; Disorderly Conduct in a Capitol Building; Parading ... in a Capitol Building	Reed pleaded Guilty to one charge: Entering ... in a Restricted Building or Grounds. The other charges are dismissed.	Sentenced 4/14/2022 to 36 months probation with 42 days intermittent confinement and 90 days home detention; fine of $2,500; restitution of $500; special assessment of $25.	Reed received a full pardon on January 20, 2025
June 29, 2023	Jeffrey David Reed	Federal: Civil Disorder; Entering or Remaining in an Restricted Building or Grounds; Disorderly or Disruptive Conduct in a Restricted Building or Grounds; Disorderly Conduct in a Capitol Building; Parading ... in a Capitol Building; Civil Disorder	Reed pleaded Not Guilty to all charges. Found Guilty on all charges in a Bench trial on 9/18/2024.	Sentenced on 12/20/2024 to 30 months incarceration; 24 months of Supervised Release; Special Assessment of $170; Restitution of $2,000.	Reed received a full pardon on January 20, 2025
February 24, 2021	Robert Maurice Reeder	Federal: Entering ... in a Restricted Building; Disorderly ... in a Restricted Building; Violent Entry and Disorderly Conduct in a Capitol Building; Parading ... in a Capitol Building	Reeder pleaded Guilty to one count: Parading ... in a Capitol Building. The other charges were dismissed.	Sentenced 10/8/2021 to 3 months in jail; $10 special assessment; $500 restitution.	Reeder received a full pardon on January 20, 2025
April 18, 2024	Carson Lionel Rees	Federal: Entering ... in a Restricted Building or Grounds; Disorderly ... in a Restricted Building or Grounds; Disorderly Conduct in a Capitol Building; Parading ... in a Capitol Building	Rees pleaded Guilty to two charges: Disorderly Conduct in a Capitol Building; Parading ... in a Capitol Building.	Sentencing set for 2/3/2025. On 1/22/2025, the court grants the government's motion to dismiss the case with prejudice.	
January 16, 2021	Guy Wesley Reffitt	Federal: Civil Disorder; Obstruction of an Official Proceeding and Aiding and Abetting; Entering ... Restricted Building or Grounds with a Deadly or Dangerous Weapon; Obstruction of Justice – Hindering Communication Through Physical Force or Threat of Physical Force	Not Guilty – all charges.	Sentenced to 7 years in federal prison, plus a $2,000 fine and 3 years of supervised release. Date: August 1, 2022	The first defendant to be convicted by a jury (March 8, 2022). Sentenced on August 1, 2022, his sentence was the longest out of all convicted up to that point.
April 27, 2021	Jeffrey Register	Federal: Entering ... in a Restricted Building or Grounds; Disorderly ... in a Restricted Building or Grounds; Disorderly Conduct in a Capitol Building; Parading ... in a Capitol Building	Register pleaded Guilty to one charge: Parading ... in a Capitol Building. The other charges are dismissed.	Sentenced 2/24/2022 to 75 days of Incarceration; $10 Special Assessment; Restitution of $500.	Register received a full pardon on January 20, 2025
March 17, 2021	Zachary Rehl	Federal: Seditious Conspiracy; Conspiracy to Obstruct Official Proceeding; Obstruction of an Official Proceeding and Aiding and Abetting; Conspiracy to Prevent an Officer from Discharging Any Duties; Civil Disorder and Aiding and Abetting; Destruction of Government Property and Aiding and Abetting (2 counts); Assaulting ... Certain Officers (2 counts)	Rehl pleaded Not Guilty to all charges. Jury selection began 12/19/2022. The jury found Rehl Guilty on six charges: Seditious Conspiracy; Conspiracy to Obstruct an Official Proceeding; Obstruction of an Official Proceeding and Aiding and Abetting; Conspiracy to Prevent an Officer from Discharging any Duties; Civil Disorder; Destruction of Government Property (fence). Not Guilty on one charge: Assaulting ... Certain Officers. No verdict on two charges: Destruction of Gov't Property (window); Assaulting ... Certain Officers.	Sentenced on 8/31/2023 to 15 years incarceration; 36 months supervised release; $600 special assessment; 75 hours of community service. A proclamation commutes the sentence to time served as of January 20, 2025	
April 01, 2021	William Rogan Reid	Federal: Obstruction of an Official Proceeding; Destruction of Government Property; Entering ... in a Restricted Building or Grounds; Disorderly ... in a Restricted Building or Grounds; Disorderly Conduct in a Capitol Building; Parading ... in a Capitol Building; Corruptly Altering, Destroying, Mutilating, or Concealing a Record, Document, or Other Object	At a stipulated bench trial on 8/23/2022, Reid was found Guilty of all charges. He admitted to a stipulated set of facts.	Sentenced on 12/7/2022 to 37 months of incarceration, 36 months of supervised release, $2,443 in restitution and $295 special assessment.	Reid received a full pardon on January 20, 2025
August 23, 2023	Robin Lee Reierson	Federal: Civil Disorder; Assaulting ... Certain Officers; Entering ... in a Restricted Building or Grounds; Disorderly ... in a Restricted Building or Grounds; Engaging in Physical Violence in a Restricted Building or Grounds; Disorderly Conduct in a Capitol Building; Act of Physical Violence in the Capitol Grounds or Buildings	Reierson pleaded Guilty to one charge: Assaulting ... Certain Officers. The other charges are dismissed.	Sentenced on 10/16/2024 to 18 Months of incarceration; 3 Years of Supervised Release; Special Assessment of $100; Restitution of $2,000; Fine of $5,000.	Reierson received a full pardon on January 20, 2025
March 06, 2024	Kayla Reifschneider	Federal: Entering ... in a Restricted Building or Grounds; Disorderly ... in a Restricted Building or Grounds; Act of Physical Violence in the Capitol Grounds or Buildings	Reifschneider pleaded Not Guilty to all charges.	On 1/21/2025, the court grants the government's motion to dismiss the case with prejudice	
February 18, 2021	Nicholas Burton Reimler	Federal: Entering ... in a Restricted Building; Disorderly ... in a Restricted Building; Parading ... in a Capitol Building	Reimler pleaded Guilty to one charge: Parading ... in a Capitol Building. The other charges are dismissed.	Sentenced 12/10/2021 to 36 Months of Probation; 60 hours community service; $10.00 Special Assessment; Restitution in the amount of $500.	Reimler received a full pardon on January 20, 2025
March 16, 2023	Elliot Resnick	Federal: Civil Disorder	Resnick pleaded Guilty to the charge.	Sentenced on 9/19/2024 to 4 Months of Imprisonment; 24 Months of supervised release; 4 months location monitoring; Special Assessment: $100; Restitution: $2,000; Fine: $8,539.	Resnick received a full pardon on January 20, 2025
November 07, 2023	Sebastian Reveles	Federal: Entering ... in a Restricted Building or Grounds; Disorderly ... in a Restricted Building or Grounds; Disorderly Conduct in a Capitol Building; Parading ... in a Capitol Building	Reveles pleaded Guilty to two charges: Disorderly ... in a Capitol Building or Grounds; Parading ... in a Capitol Building.	Sentencing set for 2/6/2025. On 2/24/2025, the court grants the government's motion to dismiss the case with prejudice.	
January 25, 2021	Jordan T. Revlett	Federal: Entering ... in a Restricted Building; Disorderly ... in a Restricted Building; Violent Entry and Disorderly Conduct in a Capitol Building; Parading ... in a Capitol Building	Revlett pleaded Guilty to one charge: Parading ... in a Capitol Building. The other charges are dismissed.	Sentenced on 7/7/2022 to 14 days incarceration, 1 year probation, a $10 Special Assessment, Restitution of $500; 80 hours of community service.	Revlett received a full pardon on January 20, 2025
May 17, 2024	Trina Reyes	Federal: Entering ... in a Restricted Building or Grounds; Disorderly ... in a Restricted Building or Grounds; Disorderly Conduct in a Capitol Building or Grounds; Parading ... in a Capitol Building	Reyes pleaded Not Guilty to all charges.	On 1/27/2025, the court grants the government's motion to dismiss the case with prejudice.	
March 15, 2023	Jessica Reyher	Federal: Civil Disorder; Entering ... in a Restricted Building or Grounds; Disorderly ... in a Restricted Building or Grounds; Engaging in Physical Violence in a Restricted Building or Grounds; Impeding Passage through the Capitol Grounds or Buildings; Act of Physical Violence in the Capitol Grounds or Buildings	Reyher pleaded Guilty to one charge: Civil Disorder. The other charges are dismissed.	Sentenced on 2/27/2024 to 90 days incarceration; three years of supervised release; $100 special assessment; $2,000 in restitution.	Reyher received a full pardon on January 20, 2025
March 15, 2023	Arthur Adam Reyher	Federal: Civil Disorder; Entering ... in a Restricted Building or Grounds; Disorderly ... in a Restricted Building or Grounds; Engaging in Physical Violence in a Restricted Building or Grounds; Impeding Passage through the Capitol Grounds or Buildings; Act of Physical Violence in the Capitol Grounds or Buildings	Reyher pleaded Guilty to one charge: Civil Disorder. The other charges are dismissed.	Sentenced on 2/27/2024 to eight months incarceration; three years of supervised release; $2,000 in restitution; $100 special assessment; 200 hours of community service.	Reyher received a full pardon on January 20, 2025
September 10, 2023	Ruben Reyna	Federal: Entering ... in a Restricted Building or Grounds; Disorderly ... in a Restricted Building or Grounds; Disorderly Conduct in a Capitol Building or Grounds; Parading ... in a Capitol Building	Reyna pleaded Guilty to one charge: Entering ... in a Restricted Building or Grounds.	Sentenced on 6/14/2024 to 14 days incarceration; 12 months of Supervised Release; Special Assessment of $25; restitution of $500.	Reyna received a full pardon on January 20, 2025
March 02, 2022	Narayana C. Rheiner	Federal: Civil Disorder; Entering ... in a Restricted Building or Grounds; Disorderly ... in a Restricted Building or Grounds; Disorderly Conduct in a Capitol Building; Parading ... in a Capitol Building	Rheiner pleaded Guilty to one charge: Civil Disorder. The other charges are dismissed.	Sentenced on 8/22/2023 to 15 months of incarceration; 36 months of supervised release; $2,000 restitution; $100 special assessment.	Rheiner received a full pardon on January 20, 2025
November 09, 2021	David Charles Rhine	Federal: Entering ... in a Restricted Building or Grounds; Disorderly ... in a Restricted Building or Grounds; Disorderly Conduct in a Capitol Building; Parading ... in a Capitol Building	Rhine pleaded Not Guilty to all charges. Found Guilty on 4/24/2023 of all charges.	Sentenced on 9/11/2023 to 4 Months of Incarceration; 1 year of supervised release; Special Assessment of $70; Fine of $7,376; 60 hours of community service.	Rhine received a full pardon on January 20, 2025
January 13, 2022	Stewart Rhodes	Federal: Seditious Conspiracy; Conspiracy to Obstruct an Official Proceeding; Obstruction of an Official Proceeding and Aiding and Abetting; Conspiracy to Prevent an Officer from Discharging Any Duties; Tampering with Documents or Proceedings and Aiding and Abetting	Not guilty to all charges	Jury trial began 9/27/2022. On 11/29/2022, Rhodes was found Guilty on three charges: Seditious Conspiracy, Obstruction of an Official Proceeding, and Tampering with Documents or Proceedings and Not Guilty on the other two charges. Sentenced on 5/25/2023 to 18 years incarceration; 36 months of supervised release; $300 special assessment.	A proclamation commutes the sentence to time served as of January 20, 2025
November 30, 2021	Howard Charles Richardson	Federal: Civil Disorder; Assaulting ... Certain Officers Using a Dangerous Weapon; Entering ... in a Restricted Building or Grounds with a Deadly or Dangerous Weapon; Disorderly ... in a Restricted Building or Grounds with a Deadly or Dangerous Weapon; Engaging in Physical Violence in a Restricted Building or Grounds with a Deadly or Dangerous Weapon; Disorderly Conduct in a Capitol Building; Act of Physical Violence in the Capitol Grounds or Buildings	Richardson pleaded Guilty to one charge: Assaulting ... Certain Officers Using a Dangerous Weapon. The other charges are dismissed.	Sentenced on 8/26/2022 to 46 months incarceration; three years of supervised release, $2,000 restitution; $100 special assessment.	Richardson received a full pardon on January 20, 2025
January 22, 2024	Edward Richmond Jr.	Federal: Assaulting ... Certain Officers Using a Dangerous Weapon	Fournier pleaded Guilty to two charges: Disorderly Conduct in a Capitol Building or Grounds; Parading ... in a Capitol Building. The other charges are dismissed.	Sentenced on 8/1/2024 to 30 days incarceration; 12 months of Probation; Special Assessment of $20; Restitution of $500; 100 hours of community service.	According to a statement of offense Richmond agreed to as part of his plea, he wore "tactical gear" to the Capitol on Jan. 6, including a helmet, goggles, and a camouflage vest. He "stayed at the front of the mob fighting against police for almost two hours," the statement said, and struck officers with a baton. According to Jan. 6 prosecutors, Richmond was dishonorably discharged from the U.S. Army after he "was convicted of manslaughter after shooting a hand-cuffed Iraqi cow herder in the head with his rifle. He was sentenced to three years of military confinement and dishonorably discharged." Richmond's criminal record, court documents indicate, also included convictions for resisting officers and driving under the influence, as well as an arrest for domestic abuse. Richmond received a full pardon on January 20, 2025
March 02, 2023	John Joseph Richter	Federal: Obstruction of an Official Proceeding and Aiding and Abetting; Entering ... in a Restricted Building or Grounds with a Deadly or Dangerous Weapon; Disorderly ... in a Restricted Building or Grounds with a Deadly or Dangerous Weapon; Entering ... on the Floor of Congress; Disorderly Conduct in a Capitol Building; Parading ... in a Capitol Building	Richter pleaded Not Guilty to all charges. Found Guilty in a Bench trial on 5/14/2024 on four charges and two lesser charges. The court vacated the Obstruction conviction on 11/22/2024.	Sentencing reset for 1/22/2025. On 1/21/2025, the court grants the government's motion to dismiss the case with prejudice.	
February 08, 2021	Jason Daniel Riddle	Federal: Entering ... in a Restricted Building; Disorderly ... in a Restricted Building; Theft of Government Property; Violent Entry and Disorderly Conduct in a Capitol Building; Parading ... in a Capitol Building	Riddle pleaded Guilty to two charges: Theft of Government Property and Parading ... in a Capitol Building. The other charges are dismissed.	Sentenced 4/4/2022 on the first charge to 90 days of incarceration; $254 restitution and $25 special assessment. Sentenced on the other charge to 3 years of probation; $500 restitution and $10 special assessment; plus 60 hours of community service.	A Keene, NH man and former veteran who stole a bottle of wine and a book from the Capitol on January 6. Defense attorneys cited Riddle's fight with alcoholism. Prosecutors believed his role in the attack was more serious. Judge Dabney Friedrich called Riddle's actions "irresponsible and egregious," due to the lack of remorse Riddle held for his actions. Riddle received a full pardon on January 20, 2025
June 21, 2023	Thomas Riddle	Federal: Disorderly ... in a Restricted Building or Grounds	Riddle pleaded Guilty to the charge.	Sentenced on 12/13/2023 to 60 days incarceration; 12 months of supervised release; special assessment of $25; Restitution in the amount of $500.	Riddle received a full pardon on January 20, 2025
May 21, 2021	Leonard Pearson Ridge	Federal: Obstruction of an Official Proceeding; Entering ... in a Restricted Building or Grounds; Disorderly ... in a Restricted Building or Grounds; Disorderly Conduct in a Capitol Building; Parading ... in a Capitol Building	Ridge pleaded Guilty to one charge: Entering ... in a Restricted Building or Grounds. The other charges are dismissed.	Sentenced 1/4/2022 to 14 days incarceration; 1 year supervised release; 100 hours community service; $1,000 fine; $500 restitution; $10 special assessment.	Ridge received a full pardon on January 20, 2025
January 19, 2021	Jorge Aaron Riley	Federal: Obstruction of an Official Proceeding and Aiding and Abetting; Entering ... in a Restricted Building or Grounds; Disorderly ... in a Restricted Building or Grounds; Disorderly Conduct in a Capitol Building; Parading ... in a Capitol Building	Riley pleaded Guilty to one charge: Obstruction of an Official Proceeding. The other charges are dismissed.	Sentenced on 9/6/2023 to 18 months of incarceration; 24 months of supervised release; $100 special assessment; $2,000 restitution.	Riley received a full pardon on January 20, 2025
January 20, 2021	Jesus D. Rivera	Federal: Entering ... in a Restricted Building or Grounds; Disorderly ... in a Restricted Building or Grounds; Disorderly Conduct in a Capitol Building or Grounds; Parading ... in a Capitol Building	Rivera pleaded Not Guilty to all charges. Bench trial held June 14 and 15, 2022. Rivera was found guilty on all charges.	Sentenced 11/3/2022 to 8 months incarceration; one year of supervised release; $500 restitution; $70 special assessment.	Rivera received a full pardon on January 20, 2025
November 01, 2023	Michael Tyler Roberts	Federal: Civil Disorder; Assaulting ... Certain Officers; Entering ... in a Restricted Building or Grounds; Disorderly ... in a Restricted Building or Grounds; Engaging in Physical Violence in a Restricted Building or Grounds; Disorderly Conduct in a Capitol Building; Act of Physical Violence in the Capitol Grounds or Buildings	Roberts pleaded Guilty to one charge: Assaulting ... Certain Officers. The other charges are dismissed.	Sentenced on 12/6/2024 to 15 months incarceration; 36 months of supervised release; $2,000 in restitution; $100 special assessment.	Roberts received a full pardon on January 20, 2025
February 01, 2024	Terrell Andrew Roberts	Federal: Knowingly Entering or Remaining in any Restricted Building or Grounds Without Lawful Authority; Disorderly ... in a Restricted Building or Grounds; Disorderly Conduct in a Capitol Building; Parading ... in a Capitol Building		On 1/22/2025, the court grants the government's motion to dismiss the case with prejudice.	
January 13, 2021	Thomas J. Robertson	Federal: Obstruction of an Official Proceeding; Aiding and Abetting; Entering ... Restricted Building; Disorderly ... Restricted Building; Violent Entry and Disorderly Conduct in a Capitol Building or Grounds	Not Guilty – all charges	Jury Trial held 4/4/2022-4/11/2022 before Judge Christopher Cooper. Robertson found Guilty on all charges. 87 months’ incarceration, 36 months’ supervised release, $2,000 restitution	One of the two police officers belonging to Virginia's Rocky Mount Police Department who allegedly attended the riot off-duty and posted a picture of themselves inside the Capitol on social media, writing they were "willing to actually put skin in the game and stand up for their rights". A jury would convict Robertson on all six charges on April 11, 2022. Robertson received a full pardon on January 20, 2025
June 12, 2024	Gabriel Raymond Robin	Federal: Disorderly Conduct in a Capitol Building or Grounds; Parading ... in a Capitol Building	Robin pleaded Guilty to both charges.	Sentenced on 12/16/2024 to 18 months of Probation (with conditions); $20 Special Assessment; Restitution of $500.	Robin received a full pardon on January 20, 2025
May 20, 2022	Benjamin Scott Robinson	Federal: Entering ... in a Restricted Building or Grounds; Disorderly ... in a Restricted Building or Grounds; Disorderly Conduct in a Capitol Building; Parading ... in a Capitol Building	Robinson pleaded Guilty to one charge: Parading ... in a Capitol Building. The other charges are dismissed.	Sentenced on 8/2/2023 to four months incarceration; $500 restitution; $10 special assessment.	Robinson received a full pardon on January 20, 2025
May 19, 2022	Brittany Nicole Robinson	Federal: Entering ... in a Restricted Building or Grounds; Disorderly ... in a Restricted Building or Grounds; Disorderly Conduct in a Capitol Building; Parading ... in a Capitol Building	Robinson pleaded Guilty to one charge: Parading ... in a Capitol Building. The other charges are dismissed.	Sentenced on 8/2/2023 to one month incarceration; $500 restitution; $10 special assessment.	Robinson received a full pardon on January 20, 2025
August 05, 2022	James Robinson	Federal: Entering ... in a Restricted Building or Grounds; Disorderly ... in a Restricted Building or Grounds; Disorderly Conduct in a Capitol Building or Grounds; Parading ... in a Capitol Building	Robinson pleaded Guilty to one charge: Parading ... in a Capitol Building. The other charges are dismissed.	Sentenced on 5/9/2023 to 6 months of incarceration; $1,000 fine; $500 restitution; $10 special assessment.	Robinson received a full pardon on January 20, 2025
May 19, 2022	Linwood Alan Robinson	Federal: Entering ... in a Restricted Building or Grounds; Disorderly ... in a Restricted Building or Grounds; Disorderly Conduct in a Capitol Building; Parading ... in a Capitol Building	Robinson pleaded Guilty to one charge: Parading ... in a Capitol Building. The other charges are dismissed.	Sentenced on 8/3/2023 to two months incarceration; $500 restitution; $10 special assessment.	Robinson received a full pardon on January 20, 2025
May 19, 2022	Linwood Alan Robinson II	Federal: Entering ... in a Restricted Building or Grounds; Disorderly ... in a Restricted Building or Grounds; Disorderly Conduct in a Capitol Building; Parading ... in a Capitol Building	Robinson pleaded Guilty to one charge: Parading ... in a Capitol Building. The other charges are dismissed.	Sentenced on 8/3/2023 to two months incarceration; $500 restitution; $10 special assessment.	Robinson received a full pardon on January 20, 2025
March 11, 2022	Mandy Robinson-Hand	Federal: Entering ... in a Restricted Building or Grounds; Disorderly ... in a Restricted Building or Grounds; Disorderly Conduct in a Capitol Building; Parading ... in a Capitol Building	Robinson-Hand pleaded Guilty to one charge: Parading ... in a Capitol Building. The other charges are dismissed.	Sentenced on 1/13/2023 to 20 days incarceration; 6 months Probation; a $10 Special Assessment; Restitution of $500; 60 hours of community service.	Robinson-Hand received a full pardon on January 20, 2025
April 13, 2021	Michael Lee Roche	Federal: Obstruction of an Official Proceeding and Aiding and Abetting; Entering ... in a Restricted Building or Grounds; Disorderly ... in a Restricted Building or Grounds; Entering ... on the Floor of Congress; Disorderly Conduct in a Capitol Building; Parading ... in a Capitol Building	Roche pleaded Not Guilty to all charges. He was found Guilty on 3/10/2023 on all charges in a stipulated Bench trial.	Sentenced on 6/9/2023 to 18 months incarceration; 36 months supervised release; $2,000 restitution; $180 special assessment.	Roche received a full pardon on January 20, 2025
December 13, 2023	Christopher George Rockey	Federal: Civil Disorder; Assaulting ... Certain Officers; Entering ... in a Restricted Building or Grounds; Disorderly ... in a Restricted Building or Grounds; Engaging in Physical Violence in a Restricted Building or Grounds; Disorderly Conduct in a Capitol Building; Act of Physical Violence in the Capitol Grounds or Buildings; Parading ... in a Capitol Building	Rockey pleaded Guilty to one charge: Assaulting ... Certain Officers. The other charges are dismissed.	Sentenced on 11/12/2024 to 18 months of incarceration; 24 months of supervised release with conditions; Special Assessment: 100; Restitution: $2,000.	Rockey received a full pardon on January 20, 2025
August 24, 2022	Jonathan Rockholt	Federal: Civil Disorder; Theft of Government Property	Rockholt pleaded Guilty to both charges.	Sentenced on 7/7/2023 to 5 Months of Incarceration; 24 Months of Supervised Release; 5 Months of Home Detention; Special Assessment of $125; Restitution of $2,000.	Rockholt received a full pardon on January 20, 2025
January 13, 2021	Nicholas Rodean	Federal: Obstruction of an Official Proceeding; Destruction of Government Property; Entering ... Restricted Building or Grounds; Disorderly ... Restricted Building or Grounds; Engaging in Physical Violence in a Restricted Building or Grounds; Disorderly Conduct in a Capitol Building; Act of Physical Violence in the Capitol Grounds or Buildings; Parading ... in a Capitol Building	Not Guilty – all charges	Found guilty in a bench trial of felony offense of destruction of government property, and six misdemeanor offenses. Sentenced to five years of probation, including 240 days of home detention, and fined $2,048.	Rodean received a full pardon on January 20, 2025
June 30, 2023	Jeremy Michael Rodgers	Federal: Civil Disorder; Assaulting ... Certain Officers Using a Dangerous Weapon; Entering ... in a Restricted Building or Grounds with a Deadly or Dangerous Weapon; Disorderly ... in a Restricted Building or Grounds with a Deadly or Dangerous Weapon; Engaging in Physical Violence in a Restricted Building or Grounds with a Deadly or Dangerous Weapon; Disorderly Conduct in a Capitol Building; Act of Physical Violence in the Capitol Grounds or Buildings; Parading ... in a Capitol Building	Rodgers pleaded Not Guilty to all charges. Found Guilty in a Bench trial on 12/12/2024 on five charges: Civil Disorder; Assaulting ... Certain Officers Using a Dangerous Weapon; Disorderly Conduct in a Capitol Building; Act of Physical Violence in the Capitol Grounds or Buildings; Parading ... in a Capitol Building. Found Guilty on the misdemeanor charges, but Not Guilty of the felony enhancement, on three charges: Entering ... in a Restricted Building or Grounds; Disorderly ... in a Restricted Building or Grounds; Engaging in Physical Violence in a Restricted Building or Grounds.	Sentencing set for 2/28/2025. On 1/22/2025, the court grants the government's motion to dismiss the case with prejudice.	
March 31, 2021	Daniel Rodriguez	Federal: Conspiracy; Obstruction of an Official Proceeding and Aiding and Abetting; Tampering with Documents or Proceedings; Civil Disorder; Inflicting Bodily Injury on Certain Officers; Theft of Government Property; Destruction of Government Property; Entering ... in a Restricted Building or Grounds with a Deadly or Dangerous Weapon	Rodriguez pleaded Guilty to four charges: Conspiracy; Obstruction of an Official Proceeding and Aiding and Abetting; Tampering with Documents or Proceedings; Inflicting Bodily Injury on Certain Officers.	The other charges are dismissed.Sentenced on 6/21/2023 to 151 months incarceration; 36 months of supervised release; special assessment of $400; $96,927 to the Metropolitan Police Department for damages to the victim; $2,000 restitution to the Architect of the Capitol.	Used a stun gun on the neck of Michael Fanone. Judge Amy Berman Jackson called Rodriguez a "one-man army of hate, attacking police officers and destroying property". Ahead of his sentencing, Rodriguez made a rambling 20 minute speech, where he stated that he truly believed a civil war was about to begin. He acknowledged his actions, but did not apologize. Rodriguez received a full pardon on January 20, 2025.
July 09, 2021	Edward Francisco Rodriguez	Federal: Civil Disorder; Assaulting ... Certain Officers Using a Dangerous Weapon and Inflicting Bodily Injury on Certain Officers; Entering ... in a Restricted Building or Grounds; Disorderly ... in a Restricted Building or Grounds; Engaging in Physical Violence in a Restricted Building or Grounds; Disorderly Conduct in Capitol Grounds; Act of Physical Violence in the Capitol Grounds or Buildings	Rodriguez pleaded Guilty to one charge: Assaulting ... Certain Officers Using a Dangerous Weapon and Inflicting Bodily Injury on Certain Officers. The other charges are dismissed.	Sentenced on 11/6/2023 to 36 months of incarceration; 36 months supervised release; $100 special assessment.	Rodriguez received a full pardon on January 20, 2025
July 13, 2023	Juan Rodriguez	Federal: Entering ... in a Restricted Building or Grounds; Disorderly ... in a Restricted Building or Grounds; Disorderly Conduct in a Capitol Building or Grounds; Enter and Remain in a Room in a Capitol Building; Obstruct or Impede Passage in a Capitol Building	Rodriguez pleaded Guilty to two charges: Enter and Remain in a Room in a Capitol Building; Obstruct or Impede Passage in a Capitol Building. The other charges are dismissed.	Sentenced on 2/16/2024 to 30 days of incarceration with no period of supervision to follow; $20 special assessment; Restitution in the amount of $500.	Rodriguez received a full pardon on January 20, 2025
July 18, 2023	Christopher Brian Roe	Federal: Assaulting ... Certain Officers (3 counts); Civil Disorder (4 counts); Destruction of Government Property; Entering ... in a Restricted Building or Grounds with a Deadly or Dangerous Weapon; Disorderly ... in a Restricted Building or Grounds with a Deadly or Dangerous Weapon; Engaging in Physical Violence in a Restricted Building or Grounds with a Deadly or Dangerous Weapon; Disorderly Conduct in a Capitol Building; Act of Physical Violence in the Capitol Grounds or Buildings; Parading ... in a Capitol Building	Roe pleaded Guilty to three charges of Assaulting ... Certain Officers. The other charges are dismissed.	Sentenced on 3/5/2024 to 70 months incarceration; 24 months of supervised release; $2,000 in restitution; $300 special assessment.	Roe received a full pardon on January 20, 2025
October 07, 2021	Moises Romero	Federal: Civil Disorder; Entering ... in a Restricted Building or Grounds; Disorderly ... in a Restricted Building or Grounds; Disorderly Conduct in a Capitol Building; Parading ... in a Capitol Building	Romero pleaded Guilty to one charge: Civil Disorder. The other charges are dismissed.	Sentenced on 7/22/2022 to 12 months and 1 day of incarceration; 12 months of supervised release; special assessment of $100; restitution of $2,000; 60 hours of community service.	Romero received a full pardon on January 20, 2025
October 01, 2021	Rafael Rondon	Federal: Obstruction of an Official Proceeding and Aiding and Abetting; Theft of Government Property (2 counts); Entering ... in a Restricted Building or Grounds; Disorderly ... in a Restricted Building or Grounds; Entering ... in the Gallery of Congress; Entering ... in Certain Rooms in the Capitol Building; Disorderly Conduct in a Capitol Building; Parading ... in a Capitol Building	Rondon pleaded Guilty to one charge: Obstruction of an Official Proceeding and Aiding and Abetting. The other charges are dismissed.	Sentenced on 11/29/2023 to five years of probation, consecutive to a separate federal sentence in the Northern District of New York, with the first 12 months to be served in home incarceration; $2,000 in restitution; Special assessment of $100; 350 hours of community service.	Rondon received a full pardon on January 20, 2025
January 13, 2021	Eliel B. Rosa	Federal: Obstruction of an Official Proceeding; Entering ... in a Restricted Building or Grounds; Disorderly ... in a Restricted Building or Grounds; Disorderly Conduct in a Capitol Building; Parading ... in a Capitol Building	Rosa pleaded Guilty to one charge: Parading ... in a Capitol Building. The other charges were dismissed.	Sentenced 10/12/2021 to 12 months of probation; 100 hours of community service; $10 assessment fee; $500 in restitution.	Rosa received a full pardon on January 20, 2025
May 16, 2022	Devin Rossman	Federal: Entering ... in a Restricted Building or Grounds; Disorderly ... in a Restricted Building or Grounds; Disorderly Conduct in a Capitol Building; Parading ... in a Capitol Building	Rossman pleaded Guilty to one charge: Parading ... in a Capitol Building. The other charges are dismissed.	Sentenced on 12/9/2022 to 36 months Probation; intermittent confinement of 32 days; special assessment of $10.00; restitution of $500; and a fine of $2,000. On 4/16/2024, he was resentenced to 5 months' incarceration, with no term of supervised release to follow, for violating his supervision.	Rossman received a full pardon on January 20, 2025
August 29, 2023	Brett Rotella	Federal: Civil Disorder; Assaulting ... Certain Officers (2 counts); Entering ... in a Restricted Building or Grounds; Disorderly ... in a Restricted Building or Grounds; Impeding Passage Through the Capitol Grounds or Buildings	Rotella pleaded Not Guilty to all charges. Found Guilty on all charges in a Jury trial on 9/11/2024.	Sentenced on 12/13/2024 to 38 months incarceration; 36 months of supervised release.	Rotella received a full pardon on January 20, 2025
April 01, 2024	Timothy Rowbottom	Federal: Entering ... in a Restricted Building or Grounds; Disorderly ... in a Restricted Building or Grounds; Disorderly Conduct in a Capitol Building; Parading ... in a Capitol Building	Rowbottom pleaded Not Guilty to all charges.	Found Guilty on all charges in a Bench trial on 11/19/2024. Sentencing set for 2/14/2025. On 1/22/2025, the court grants the government's motion to dismiss the case with prejudice	
February 09, 2021	Greg Rubenacker	Federal: Civil Disorder; Obstruction of an Official Proceeding; Assaulting ... Certain Officers; Entering ... in a Restricted Building or Grounds; Disorderly ... in a Restricted Building or Grounds; Engaging in Physical Violence in a Restricted Building or Grounds; Disorderly Conduct in a Capitol Building; Impeding Passage Through the Capitol Grounds or Buildings; Act of Physical Violence in the Capitol Grounds or Buildings; Parading ... in a Capitol Building	Rubenacker pleaded Guilty to all charges.	He was sentenced on 5/26/22 to 41 months incarceration; 36 months of supervised release; restitution of $2000; and a special assessment of $415.	Rubenacker received a full pardon on January 20, 2025
January 11, 2021	Bradley Francis Rukstales	Federal: Entering ... Restricted Building; Disorderly ... Restricted Building; Violent Entry and Disorderly Conduct in a Capitol Building; Parading ... in a Capitol Building	Guilty – one charge: Parading ... in a Capitol Building. The other charges were dismissed.	Sentenced to 30 days in jail	Rukstales received a full pardon on January 20, 2025
February 27, 2023	Jesse James Rumson	Federal: Civil Disorder; Assaulting ... Certain Officers; Entering ... in a Restricted Building or Grounds; Disorderly ... in a Restricted Building or Grounds; Engaging in Physical Violence in a Restricted Building or Grounds; Disorderly Conduct in a Capitol Building; Act of Physical Violence in the Capitol Grounds or Buildings; Parading ... in a Capitol Building	Rumson found Guilty on all charges in a Bench trial on 5/24/2024.	Sentencing reset for 2/12/2025. On 1/22/2025, the court grants the government's motion to dismiss the case with prejudice.	
February 02, 2023	Rally Runner	Federal: Civil Disorder; Entering ... in a Restricted Building or Grounds; Disorderly ... in a Restricted Building or Grounds; Disorderly Conduct in a Capitol Building; Impeding Passage through the Capitol Grounds or Buildings	Runner pleaded Guilty to one charge: Civil Disorder. The other charges are dismissed.	Sentenced on 8/15/2024 to 10 months of incarceration; 24 months of supervised release; $100 Special Assessment; $1,000 Fine; $2,000 Restitution.	Runner received a full pardon on January 20, 2025
November 09, 2023	Valerie Sue Rushing	Federal: Entering ... in a Restricted Building or Grounds; Disorderly ... in a Restricted Building or Grounds; Disorderly Conduct in a Capitol Building or Grounds; Parading ... in a Capitol Building	Rushing pleaded Guilty to two charges: Disorderly Conduct in a Capitol Building or Grounds; Parading ... in a Capitol Building. The other charges are dismissed.	Sentenced on 8/20/2024 to 24 months of probation; $20 Special Assessment; Restitution of $500; 40 hours of community service.	Rushing received a full pardon on January 20, 2025
August 24, 2022	Bobby Wayne Russell	Federal: Assaulting ... Certain Officers; Civil Disorder (2 counts); Entering ... in a Restricted Building or Grounds; Disorderly ... in a Restricted Building or Grounds; Engaging in Physical Violence in a Restricted Building or Grounds; Act of Physical Violence in the Capitol Grounds or Buildings	Russell pleaded Guilty to one charge: Assaulting ... Certain Officers. The other charges are dismissed.	Sentenced on 11/17/2023 to 12 months and 1 day of incarceration; 24 months of supervised release, the first 6 months on home detention; 250 hours of community service; $100 special assessment; $2,000 restitution.	Russell received a full pardon on January 20, 2025
April 09, 2021	Michael Joseph Rusyn	Federal: Entering ... in any Restricted Building or Grounds; Disorderly ... in a Restricted Building or Grounds; Disorderly Conduct in a Capitol Building; Parading ... in a Capitol Building	Rusyn pleaded Guilty to one charge: Parading ... in a Capitol Building. The other charges are dismissed.	Sentenced 1/11/2022 to 24 months of Probation; 60 days location monitoring/home confinement; Special Assessment of $10; Restitution of $500; Fine of $2,000.	Rusyn received a full pardon on January 20, 2025
October 27, 2022	Macsen Rutledge	Federal: Entering ... in a Restricted Building or Grounds; Disorderly ... in a Restricted Building or Grounds; Disorderly Conduct in a Capitol Building; Parading ... in a Capitol Building	Rutledge pleaded Guilty to one charge: Parading ... in a Capitol Building. The other charges are dismissed.	Sentenced on 10/26/2023 to 24 months of probation; a $10 special assessment; $500 in restitution.	Rutledge received a full pardon on January 20, 2025
October 13, 2021	Meghan Rutledge	Federal: Entering ... in a Restricted Building or Grounds; Disorderly ... in a Restricted Building or Grounds; Disorderly Conduct in a Capitol Building; Parading ... in a Capitol Building	Rutledge pleaded Guilty to one charge: Parading ... in a Capitol Building. The other charges are dismissed.	Sentenced on 3/31/2023 to 3 years probation; 90 days home confinement; 60 hours of community service; $500 restitution; $10 special assessment.	Rutledge received a full pardon on January 20, 2025
March 04, 2021	Jerry Ryals	Federal: Civil Disorder	Ryals pleaded Guilty to Civil Disorder.	Sentenced on 10/18/2022 to 9 months incarceration followed by 36 Months Supervised Release; a Special Assessment of $100; restitution of $2,000.	Ryals received a full pardon on January 20, 2025
April 10, 2024	Jack Westly Ryan, Jr.	Federal: Civil Disorder; Assaulting ... Certain Officers; Entering ... in a Restricted Building or Grounds; Disorderly ... in a Restricted Building or Grounds; Engaging in Physical Violence in a Restricted Building or Grounds; Disorderly Conduct in a Capitol Building; Act of Physical Violence in the Capitol Building or Grounds	Ryan pleaded Not Guilty to all charges.	Jury trial set for 1/28/2025. On 1/21/2025, the court grants the government's motion to dismiss the case with prejudice.	
January 15, 2021	Jennifer Leigh Ryan (Jenna Ryan)	Federal: Entering ... Restricted Building; Disorderly ... Restricted Building; Violent Entry and Disorderly Conduct in a Capitol Building; Parading ... in a Capitol Building	Guilty – one charge: Parading ... in a Capitol Building. The other charges were dismissed.	60 days' incarceration; a $10 Special Assessment; Restitution in the amount of $500; and a $1,000 fine. Date: November 4, 2021	She has served as a realtor in northern Texas. She had previously made brazen statements both publicly and on social media that she would never be incarcerated since she had "blond hair and white skin". Ryan received a full pardon on January 20, 2025.
January 27, 2021	Jeffrey P. Sabol	Federal: Obstruction of an Official Proceeding and Aiding and Abetting; Assaulting ... Certain Officers (2 counts); Civil Disorder (4 counts); Robbery in a Federal Enclave; Inflicting Bodily Injury on Certain Officers and Aiding and Abetting; Assaulting ... Certain Officers Using a Dangerous Weapon and Aiding and Abetting; Entering ... in a Restricted Building or Grounds with a Deadly or Dangerous Weapon; Disorderly ... in a Restricted Building or Grounds with a Deadly or Dangerous Weapon; Engaging in Physical Violence in a Restricted Building or Grounds with a Deadly or Dangerous Weapon; Act of Physical Violence in the Capitol Grounds or Buildings	Sabol pleaded Not Guilty to all charges. A Stipulated Bench Trial held 8/18/2023 found him Guilty on three charges: Obstruction of an Official Proceeding; Robbery; Assaulting ... Certain Officers with a Deadly or Dangerous Weapon. The other charges are dismissed.	Sentenced on 3/21/2024 to 63 Months of incarceration (with credit for time served); Supervised Release of 36 months; Special Assessment of $300; Restitution of $32,165.65.	Sabol received a full pardon on January 20, 2025
July 07, 2022	Lilith Anton Saer	Federal: Entering ... in a Restricted Building or Grounds; Disorderly ... in a Restricted Building or Grounds; Disorderly Conduct in a Capitol Building or Grounds; Parading ... in a Capitol Building	Saer pleaded Guilty to one charge: Parading ... in a Capitol Building. The other charges are dismissed.	Sentenced on 4/4/2023 to 3 years of probation; 200 hours of community service; $500 restitution; and $10 special assessment.	Saer received a full pardon on January 20, 2025
January 19, 2021	Mark Gabriel Sahady	Federal: Entering ... in a Restricted Building or Grounds; Disorderly ... in a Restricted Building or Grounds; Disorderly Conduct in a Capitol Building; Parading ... in a Capitol Building	Sahady pleaded Not Guilty to all charges. The Court dismisses the Obstruction charge on 7/18/2024. Found Guilty on all remaining charges in a Bench trial verdict on 8/15/2024.	Sentenced on 11/20/2024 to 5 Months of Incarceration; 12 Months of Supervised Release (with conditions); Special Assessment of $70; Fine of $2,000.	Sahady received a full pardon on January 20, 2025
January 30, 2021	Ryan Stephen Samsel	Federal: Civil Disorder; Assaulting ... Certain Officers Using a Dangerous Weapon, Inflicting Bodily Injury and Aiding and Abetting (2 counts); Entering ... in a Restricted Building or Grounds with a Deadly or Dangerous Weapon; Disorderly ... in a Restricted Building or Grounds with a Deadly or Dangerous Weapon; Engaging in Physical Violence in a Restricted Building or Grounds with a Deadly or Dangerous Weapon, Resulting in Significant Bodily Injury and Aiding and Abetting; Disorderly Conduct in a Capitol Building or Grounds; Act of Physical Violence in the Capitol Grounds or Buildings and Aiding and Abetting; Obstruction of an Official Proceeding and Aiding and Abetting; Civil Disorder; Assaulting ... Certain Officers; Assaulting ... Certain Officers Using a Dangerous Weapon	Samsel pleaded Not Guilty to all charges. Bench trial verdict on 2/2/2024 finds him Guilty on eight charges: Civil Disorder; Assaulting ... Certain Officers Using a Dangerous Weapon and Inflicting Bodily Injury and Aiding and Abetting; Disorderly Conduct in a Capitol Building or Grounds; Act of Physical Violence in the Capitol Grounds or Buildings and Aiding and Abetting; Obstruction of an Official Proceeding and Aiding and Abetting; Civil Disorder; Assaulting ... Certain Officers; Assaulting ... Certain Officers Using a Dangerous Weapon. Not Guilty on the other 4 charges.	Sentencing reset for 2/14/2025. On 9/3/2024, the Court orders dismissal of Obstruction charge.On 1/21/2025, the court grants the government's motion to dismiss the case with prejudice.	
November 07, 2023	Aron Joel Sanchez	Federal: Entering ... in a Restricted Building or Grounds; Disorderly ... in a Restricted Building or Grounds; Disorderly Conduct in a Capitol Building; Parading ... in a Capitol Building	Sanchez pleaded Guilty to two charges: Disorderly ... in a Capitol Building or Grounds; Parading ... in a Capitol Building.	Sentencing set for 2/6/2025. On 2/24/2025, the court grants the government's motion to dismiss the case with prejudice.	
May 25, 2021	Jonathan Ace Sanders, Sr.	Federal: Entering ... in a Restricted Building; Disorderly ... in a Restricted Building; Violent Entry and Disorderly Conduct; Parading ... in a Capitol Building	Sanders pleaded Guilty to one charge: Parading ... in a Capitol Building. The other charges were dismissed.	Sentenced 11/4/2021 to 3 years of probation; $500 in restitution; $10 special assessment; 60 hours of community service.	Sanders received a full pardon on January 20, 2025
January 28, 2021	Ronald Sandlin	Federal: Conspiracy to Obstruct an Official Proceeding; Obstruction of an Official Proceeding; Assaulting ... Certain Officers (2 counts); Civil Disorder; Entering ... in a Restricted Building or Grounds; Disorderly ... in a Restricted Building or Grounds	Sandlin pleaded Guilty to two charges: Conspiracy to Obstruct an Official Proceeding; and Assaulting ... Certain Officers. The other charges are dismissed.	Sentenced on 12/9/2022 to 63 months of incarceration; 36 months of supervised release; $2,000 in restitution; $200 special assessment: $20,000 fine.	Sandlin received a full pardon on January 20, 2025
February 19, 2021	Deborah Sandoval	Federal: Entering ... in a Restricted Building or Grounds; Disorderly ... in a Restricted Building or Grounds; Disorderly Conduct in a Capitol Building; Parading ... in a Capitol Building	Sandoval pleaded Guilty to one charge: Entering ... in a Restricted Building or Grounds. The other charges are dismissed.	Sentenced on 5/1/2023 to 5 Months incarceration; 12 Months of Supervised Release; Special Assessment of $25; restitution of $500.	Sandoval received a full pardon on January 20, 2025
February 19, 2021	Salvador Sandoval Jr.	Federal: Civil Disorder; Assaulting ... Certain Officers; Obstruction of an Official Proceeding and Aiding and Abetting; Entering ... in a Restricted Building or Grounds; Disorderly or Disruptive Conduct in a Restricted Building or Grounds; Engaging in Physical Violence in a Restricted Building or Grounds; Disorderly Conduct in a Capitol Building; Parading ... in a Capitol Building; Act of Physical Violence in the Capitol Grounds or Buildings	Sandoval pleaded Not Guilty to all charges. He was found Guilty on all charges in a Bench trial on 12/15/2022.	Sentenced on 8/7/2023 to 88 months incarceration; 36 months of supervised release; $2,000 in restitution; $705 special assessment; $500 fine.	Sandoval received a full pardon on January 20, 2025
January 14, 2021	Robert Sanford	Federal: Civil Disorder; Assaulting ... Certain Officers Using a Dangerous Weapon; Entering ... in a Restricted Building or Grounds with a Deadly or Dangerous Weapon; Disorderly ... in a Restricted Building or Grounds; Act of Physical Violence in the Capitol Grounds or Buildings; Parading ... in a Capitol Building	Sanford pleaded Guilty to one charge: Assaulting ... Certain Officers Using a Dangerous Weapon. The other charges are dismissed.	Sentenced on 4/11/2023 to 52 Months of incarceration; 36 months of supervised release (with conditions); Restitution: $5,798; Special Assessment: $100.	Sanford received a full pardon on January 20, 2025
August 23, 2021	Blas Santillan	Federal: Entering ... in a Restricted Building or Grounds; Disorderly ... in a Restricted Building or Grounds; Disorderly Conduct in a Capitol Building; Parading ... in a Capitol Building	Santillan pleaded Guilty to one charge: Parading ... in a Capitol Building. The other charges are dismissed.	Sentenced on 9/23/2022 to 45 days of incarceration; 36 months of probation; Special Assessment of $10; Restitution of $500; 60 hours of community service.	Santillan received a full pardon on January 20, 2025
January 29, 2021	Diana Santos-Smith	Federal: Entering ... Restricted Building or Grounds; Disorderly ... Restricted Building or Grounds; Disorderly Conduct in a Capitol Building; Parading ... in a Capitol Building	Guilty – one charge: Parading, Demonstrating, and Picketing in a Capitol Building. The other charges are dismissed.	Sentenced on January 25, 2022	
September 21, 2021	Anthony Sargent	Federal: Civil Disorder; Destruction of Government Property; Entering ... in a Restricted Building or Grounds; Disorderly ... in a Restricted Building or Grounds; Engaging in Physical Violence in a Restricted Building or Grounds; Disorderly Conduct in a Capitol Building; Act of Physical Violence in the Capitol Grounds or Buildings	Sargent pleaded Guilty to all charges.	Sentenced on 12/15/2023 to 60 months of incarceration; 36 months of supervised release; $2,980 in restitution; $220 special assessment.	Sargent received a full pardon on January 20, 2025
February 01, 2023	Dustin Sargent	Federal: Obstruction of an Official Proceeding and Aiding and Abetting; Civil Disorder; Assaulting ... Certain Officers (2 counts); Entering ... in a Restricted Building or Grounds; Disorderly ... in a Restricted Building or Grounds; Engaging in Physical Violence in a Restricted Building or Grounds; Disorderly Conduct in a Capitol Building; Act of Physical Violence in the Capitol Grounds or Buildings; Parading ... in a Capitol Building	Sargent pleaded Not Guilty to all charges. On 11/4/2024, the Obstruction charge was dismissed.	On 1/21/2025, the court grants the government's motion to dismiss the case with prejudice	
March 09, 2021	Troy E. Sargent	Federal: Civil Disorder; Assaulting ... Certain Officers; Entering ... in a Restricted Building or Grounds; Disorderly ... in a Restricted Building or Grounds; Engaging in Physical Violence in a Restricted Building or Grounds; Act of Physical Violence in the Capitol Grounds or Buildings	Sargent pleaded Guilty to all six charges.	Sentenced on 12/12/2022 to 14 Months of Incarceration with credit for time served; 2 years of supervised release; Special assessment of $285; Restitution of $500.	Sargent received a full pardon on January 20, 2025
April 30, 2021	Oliver Louis Sarko	Federal: Parading ... in a Capitol Building	Sarko pleaded Guilty to the charge.	Sentenced 4/29/2022 to 30 days incarceration; 36 months probation; $500 restitution; $10 special assessment.	Sarko received a full pardon on January 20, 2025
July 31, 2024	Tristan Sartor	Federal: Disorderly Conduct in a Capitol Building or Grounds; Parading ... in a Capitol Building	Sartor pleaded Guilty to both charges.	Sentencing set for 2/28/2025. On 1/28/2025, the court grants the government's motion to dismiss the case with prejudice.	
February 14, 2023	William Patrick Sarsfield, III	Federal: Civil Disorder; Entering ... in a Restricted Building or Grounds; Disorderly ... in a Restricted Building or Grounds; Engaging in Physical Violence in a Restricted Building or Grounds; Impeding Passage through the Capitol Grounds or Buildings; Act of Physical Violence in the Capitol Grounds or Buildings	Sarsfield pleaded Not Guilty to all charges. Found Guilty on all charges in a Jury trial on 11/1/2024.	Sentencing is set for 3/4/2025. On 1/22/2025, the court grants the government's motion to dismiss the case with prejudice	
February 05, 2024	Cepane Sarty	Federal: Civil Disorder; Assaulting ... Certain Officers; Entering ... in a Restricted Building or Grounds; Disorderly ... in a Restricted Building or Grounds; Engaging in Physical Violence in a Restricted Building or Grounds; Disorderly Conduct in a Capitol Building; Act of Physical violence in the Capitol Grounds or Buildings; Parading ... in a Capitol Building	Sarty pleaded Not Guilty to all charges.	Jury trial set for 6/2/2025. On 1/24/2025, the court grants the government's motion to dismiss the case with prejudice.	
February 05, 2024	Seth Sarty	Federal: Civil Disorder; Assaulting ... Certain Officers; Entering ... in a Restricted Building or Grounds; Disorderly ... in a Restricted Building or Grounds; Engaging in Physical Violence in a Restricted Building or Grounds; Disorderly Conduct in a Capitol Building; Act of Physical violence in the Capitol Grounds or Buildings; Parading ... in a Capitol Building	Sarty pleaded Not Guilty to all charges.	Jury trial set for 6/2/2025. On 1/24/2025, the court grants the government's motion to dismiss the case with prejudice.	
December 13, 2022	Zachariah John Sattler	Federal: Entering ... in a Restricted Building or Grounds; Disorderly ... in a Restricted Building or Grounds; Disorderly Conduct in a Capitol Building or Grounds; Parading ... in a Capitol Building	Sattler pleaded Guilty to one charge: Parading ... in a Capitol Building. The other charges are dismissed.	Sentenced on 7/27/2023 to 30 days incarceration; 24 months of probation; special assessment of $10; restitution of $500.	Sattler received a full pardon on January 20, 2025
August 01, 2023	Barry Saturday	Federal: Civil Disorder; Entering ... in a Restricted Building or Grounds; Disorderly ... in a Restricted Building or Grounds; Disorderly Conduct in a Capitol Building	Saturday pleaded Not Guilty to all counts.	Jury trial set for 4/21/2025. On 1/21/2025, the court grants the government's motion to dismiss the case with prejudice.	
February 09, 2024	Aaron Donald Sauer	Federal: Civil Disorder; Assaulting ... Certain Officers; Destruction of Government Property; Entering ... in a Restricted Building or Grounds; Disorderly Conduct and Disruptive Conduct in a Restricted Building or Grounds; Engaging in Physical Violence in a Restricted Building or Grounds; Disorderly Conduct in a Capitol Building; Act of Physical Violence in the Capitol Grounds or Buildings	Sauer pleaded Not Guilty to all charges. Jury Trial set for 5/5/2025.	On 1/21/2025, the court grants the government's motion to dismiss the case with prejudice.	
April 03, 2024	Steve Saxiones	Federal: Civil Disorder; Assaulting ... Certain Officers; Entering ... in a Restricted Building or Grounds; Disorderly ... in a Restricted Building or Grounds; Engaging in Physical Violence in a Restricted Building or Grounds; Disorderly Conduct in a Capitol Building or Grounds; Act of Physical Violence in the Capitol Grounds or Buildings	Saxiones pleaded Not Guilty to all charges.	Jury Trial set for 3/24/2025. On 1/24/2025, the court grants the government's motion to dismiss the case with prejudice	
October 02, 2024	Emily Sayer-Mayosky	Federal: Disorderly Conduct in a Capitol Building; Parading ... in a Capitol Building	Sayer-Mayosky pleaded Guilty to both charges.	On 1/21/2025, the court grants the government's motion to dismiss the case with prejudice.	
March 25, 2021	Frank J. Scavo	Federal: Entering ... in a Restricted Building; Disorderly ... in a Restricted Building; Violent Entry and Disorderly Conduct in a Capitol Building; Parading ... in a Capitol Building	Scavo pleaded Guilty to one charge: Parading ... in a Capitol Building. The other charges are dismissed.	Sentenced 11/22/2021 to 60 days incarceration; pay a $10 special assessment, $5,000 fine and restitution in the amount of $500.	Scavo received a full pardon on January 20, 2025
January 13, 2022	Jeffrey Schaefer	Federal: Entering ... in a Restricted Building; Disorderly ... in a Restricted Building; Disorderly Conduct in a Capitol Building; Parading ... in a Capitol Building	Schaefer pleaded Guilty to one charge: Parading ... in a Capitol Building. The other charges are dismissed.	Sentenced 11/18/2022 to 30 days of incarceration, $2,000 fine, $500 restitution, $10 special assessment.	Schaefer received a full pardon on January 20, 2025
January 17, 2024	Shawn Everett Schaefer	Federal: Disorderly Conduct in a Capitol Building; Parading ... in a Capitol Building	Schaefer pleaded Guilty to both charges.	Sentencing reset for 1/30/2025. On 1/24/2025, the court grants the government's motion to dismiss the case with prejudice	
January 17, 2021	Jon Schaffer	Federal: Knowingly Entering ... Restricted Building or Grounds Without Lawful Authority; Disrupting the Orderly Conduct of Government Business; Knowingly Engages in an Act of Physical Violence Against Any Person or Property in any Restricted Building or Grounds; Violent Entry and Disorderly Conduct in a Capitol Building; Engage in an Act of Physical Violence in a Capitol Building; Parade, Demonstrate, or Picket in a Capitol Building	Guilty – Obstruction of an Official Proceeding and Entering ... Restricted Building or Grounds with a Deadly or Dangerous Weapon (bear spray); The other charges were dismissed. (April 16, 2021)		Co-founder and guitarist of the heavy metal band Iced Earth, surrendered to the FBI in Indianapolis, Indiana. In the days following January 6, Schaffer was identified by music websites as possibly having been inside the building. The other members of Iced Earth issued a statement on January 10 denouncing the attack. Following Schaffer's arrest, Century Media Records removed both Iced Earth and Schaffer's side-project band Demons & Wizards from the roster section of their website and removed both groups' merchandise from their online store, but no official announcement was made that the bands had been dropped from the record label. Schaffer received a full pardon on January 20, 2025
August 14, 2024	Charles E. Schimmel, Sr.	Federal: Civil Disorder; Entering or Remaining in a Restricted Building or Grounds; Disorderly or Disruptive Conduct in a Restricted Building or Grounds; Disorderly Conduct in a Capitol Building or Grounds; Parading ... in a Capitol Building		On 1/22/2025, the court grants the government's motion to dismiss the case with prejudice.	
August 14, 2024	Logan Schimmel	Federal: Civil Disorder; Entering or Remaining in a Restricted Building or Grounds; Disorderly or Disruptive Conduct in a Restricted Building or Grounds; Disorderly Conduct in a Capitol Building or Grounds; Parading ... in a Capitol Building		On 1/22/2025, the court grants the government's motion to dismiss the case with prejudice	
July 28, 2023	Adrian Christian Schmidt	Federal: Civil Disorder; Entering ... in a Restricted Building or Grounds; Disorderly ... in a Restricted Building or Grounds; Disorderly Conduct in a Capitol Building or Grounds; Parading ... in a Capitol Building	Schmidt pleaded Guilty to one charge: Civil Disorder.	Sentenced on 11/5/2025 to 14 months incarceration; 36 months of supervised release; $2,000 in restitution.	Schmidt received a full pardon on January 20, 2025
June 22, 2023	Matthew Schmitz	Federal: Entering ... in a Restricted Building or Grounds; Disorderly ... in a Restricted Building or Grounds; Disorderly Conduct in a Capitol Building or Grounds; Parading ... in a Capitol Building	Schmitz pleaded Guilty to one charge: Entering ... in a Restricted Building or Grounds. The other charges are dismissed.	Sentenced on 1/16/2025 to 3 Years of Probation; Special Assessment of $25; Restitution of $500.	Schmitz received a full pardon on January 20, 2025
March 18, 2021	Robert Schornak	Federal: Obstruction of an Official Proceeding; Entering ... in a Restricted Building or Grounds; Disorderly ... in a Restricted Building or Grounds; Disorderly Conduct in a Capitol Building; Parading ... in a Capitol Building	Schornak pleaded Guilty to one charge: Entering ... in a Restricted Building or Grounds. The other charges are dismissed.	Sentenced 2/18/2022 to 3 years probation; 28 days intermittent confinement; 60 days home confinement/location monitoring; $500 restitution; $25 special assessment.	Schornak received a full pardon on January 20, 2025
December 03, 2021	Amy L Schubert	Federal: Entering ... in a Restricted Building; Disorderly ... in a Restricted Building; Violent Entry and Disorderly Conduct; Parading ... in a Capitol Building	Schubert pleaded Guilty to one charge: Parading ... in a Capitol Building. The other charges are dismissed.	Sentenced 3/8/2022 to 18 months of probation; $2,000 fine; $500 restitution; $10 special assessment; and 100 hours of community service.	Schubert received a full pardon on January 20, 2025
July 26, 2021	John A Schubert Jr.	Federal: Entering ... in a Restricted Building; Disorderly ... in a Restricted Building; Violent Entry and Disorderly Conduct; Parading ... in a Capitol Building	Schubert pleaded Guilty to one charge: Parading ... in a Capitol Building. The other charges are dismissed.	Sentenced 3/8/2022 to 18 months of probation; $1,500 fine; $500 restitution; $10 special assessment and 100 hours of community service.	Schubert received a full pardon on January 20, 2025
October 04, 2023	John Anthony Schubert III	Federal: Assaulting ... Certain Officers	Schubert pleaded Guilty to the charge.	Sentenced on 7/11/2024 to 18 months incarceration; 24 months supervised release; $2,000 Restitution; $100 Special Assessment.	Schubert received a full pardon on January 20, 2025
July 16, 2024	Ronald Eric Schultz	Federal: Entering ... in a Restricted Building or Grounds; Disorderly ... in a Restricted Building or Grounds; Disorderly Conduct in a Capitol Building or Grounds; Parading ... in a Capitol Building	Schultz pleaded Not Guilty to all charges.	On 1/24/2025, the court grants the government's motion to dismiss the case with prejudice.	
March 10, 2023	Kenneth Christian Paul Schulz	Federal: Entering ... in a Restricted Building or Grounds; Disorderly ... in a Restricted Building or Grounds; Disorderly Conduct in a Capitol Building; Parading ... in a Capitol Building	Schulz pleaded Guilty to one charge: Parading ... in a Capitol Building. The other charges are dismissed.	Sentenced on 9/7/2023 to 18 months probation; $500 restitution; $10 special assessment; 50 hours of community service; 30 days in a residential community correctional facility.	Schulz received a full pardon on January 20, 2025
November 13, 2023	Justin R. Schulze	Federal: Civil Disorder; Entering ... in a Restricted Building or Grounds; Disorderly ... in a Restricted Building or Grounds; Disorderly Conduct in a Capitol Building; Parading ... in a Capitol Building	Schulze pleaded Not Guilty to all charges. Status Conference set for 1/14/2025.	On 1/21/2025, the court grants the government's motion to dismiss the case with prejudice.	
February 01, 2021	Katherine Staveley Schwab	Federal: Entering ... in a Restricted Building; Disorderly ... in a Restricted Building; Violent Entry and Disorderly Conduct in a Capitol Building; Parading ... in a Capitol Building; Act of Physical Violence in the Grounds	Schwab pleaded Guilty to one charge: Disorderly ... in a Restricted Building. The other charges are dismissed.	Sentenced 12/9/2022 to 45 days of incarceration; 12 months of supervised release; a $25 special assessment and $500 in restitution.	Schwab received a full pardon on January 20, 2025
February 04, 2021	Peter Schwartz	Federal: Assaulting ... Certain Officers Using a Dangerous Weapon (3 counts); Assaulting ... Certain Officers Using a Dangerous Weapon and Aiding and Abetting; Civil Disorder; Obstruction of an Official Proceeding; Entering ... in a Restricted Building or Grounds with a Deadly or Dangerous Weapon; Disorderly ... in a Restricted Building or Grounds with a Deadly or Dangerous Weapon; Engaging in Physical Violence in a Restricted Building or Grounds with a Deadly or Dangerous Weapon; Disorderly Conduct in the Capitol Grounds or Buildings; Act of Physical Violence in the Capitol Grounds or Buildings	Schwartz pleaded Not Guilty to all charges. On 12/6/2022 he was convicted in a jury trial on all charges.	Sentenced on 5/5/2023 to 170 months of incarceration; 36 months of supervised release; $920 special assessment; $2,000 restitution. On 1/17/2025, the Obstruction conviction is vacated.	According to Federal prosecutors, Schwartz had a "jaw-dropping criminal history of 38 prior convictions going back to 1991" prior to the January 6 riots. Prosecutors described a 1994 disorderly conduct case for throwing a "lit cigarette at a victim" and striking her "near her eyes"; a 2004 case for assault with a deadly weapon; a 2019 case for "terroristic threats" for threatening police while under arrest for domestic assault; and a 2020 case of assaulting his wife "including by biting her on the forehead and punching her multiple times." Schwartz received a full pardon on January 20, 2025
April 21, 2021	Dovid Schwartzberg	Federal: Entering ... in a Restricted Building or Grounds; Disorderly ... in a Restricted Building or Grounds; Disorderly Conduct in a Capitol Building; Parading ... in a Capitol Building	Schwartzberg pleaded Guilty to one charge: Parading ... in a Capitol Building. The other charges were dismissed.	Sentenced 9/7/2022 to 45 days of incarceration, $500 restitution; $10 special assessment.	Schwartzberg received a full pardon on January 20, 2025
April 23, 2021	Esther Schwemmer	Federal: Entering ... in a Restricted Building; Disorderly ... in a Restricted Building; Violent Entry and Disorderly Conduct; Parading ... in a Capitol Building	Schwemmer pleaded Guilty to charge: Parading ... in a Capitol Building. The other charges are dismissed.	Sentenced 1/10/2022 to 2 years of probation; $500 restitution; and $10 special assessment; 60 hours of community service.	Schwemmer received a full pardon on January 20, 2025
June 16, 2021	Anthony Joseph Scirica	Federal: Entering ... in a Restricted Building; Disorderly ... in a Restricted Building; Violent Entry and Disorderly Conduct in a Capitol Building; Parading ... in a Capitol Building	Scirica pleaded Guilty to one charge: Parading ... in a Capitol Building. The other charges are dismissed.	Sentenced 1/20/2022 to 15 days of incarceration (7 intermittent weekends), with credit for time served (1 day); $500 fine; and $500 in restitution; $10 special assessment.	Scirica received a full pardon on January 20, 2025
May 20, 2021	Daniel Lyons Scott	Federal: Obstruction of an Official Proceeding and Aiding and Abetting; Entering ... in a Restricted Building or Grounds; Disorderly ... in a Restricted Building or Grounds; Engaging in Physical Violence in a Restricted Building or Grounds; Act of Physical Violence in the Capitol Grounds or Buildings; Civil Disorder (2 counts); Assaulting ... Certain Officers (2 counts)	Scott pleaded Guilty to two charges: Obstruction of an Official Proceeding and Assaulting ... Certain Officers. The other charges are dismissed.	Sentenced on 7/12/2023 to 60 months incarceration; 36 months of supervised release; special assessment of $200; restitution of $2,000.	Scott received a full pardon on January 20, 2025
June 05, 2024	Jarrett Carl Scott	Federal: Civil Disorder; Assaulting ... Certain Officers; Entering ... in a Restricted Building or Grounds with a Deadly or Dangerous Weapon; Disorderly ... in a Restricted Building or Grounds with a Deadly or Dangerous Weapon; Engaging in Physical Violence in a Restricted Building or Grounds with a Deadly or Dangerous Weapon; Disorderly Conduct in a Capitol Building; Act of Physical Violence in the Capitol Building or Grounds			
June 05, 2024	Tighe John Scott	Federal: Civil Disorder; Assaulting ... Certain Officers (2 counts); Entering ... in a Restricted Building or Grounds; Disorderly ... in a Restricted Building or Grounds; Engaging in Violence in a Restricted Building or Grounds; Disorderly Conduct in a Capitol Building; Act of Physical Violence in the Capitol Building or Grounds	Scott pleaded Not Guilty to all charges.	On 1/21/2025, the court grants the government's motion to dismiss the case with prejudice.	
February 16, 2021	Christian Secor	Federal: Obstruction of an Official Proceeding; Civil Disorder; Assaulting ... Certain Officers; Entering ... Restricted Building or Grounds; Disorderly ... Restricted Building or Grounds; Entering and Remaining on the Floor of Congress; Entering and Remaining in the Gallery of Congress; Entering and Remaining in Certain Rooms in the Capitol Building; Disorderly Conduct in a Capitol Building; Parading ... in a Capitol Building	Guilty – obstruction of an official proceeding	3½ years in prison	Secor received a full pardon on January 20, 2025
January 14, 2021	Hunter Seefried	Federal: Obstruction of an Official Proceeding; Entering ... Restricted Building or Grounds; Disorderly ... Restricted Building or Grounds; Disorderly Conduct in a Capitol Building; Parading ... in a Capitol Building; Entering ... Restricted Building or Grounds with Physical Violence Against Property; Destruction of Government Property; Act of Physical Violence in the Capitol Grounds or Building	Not Guilty – all charges	Found guilty of obstructing the certification of the 2020 presidential vote, found guilty on four related misdemeanor charges.	Seefried received a full pardon on January 20, 2025
January 14, 2021	Kevin Seefried	Federal: Obstruction of an Official Proceeding; Entering ... Restricted Building or Grounds; Disorderly ... Restricted Building or Grounds; Disorderly Conduct in a Capitol Building; Parading ... in a Capitol Building	Not Guilty – all charges	Found guilty of obstructing the certification of the 2020 presidential vote, found guilty on four related misdemeanor charges.	From Laurel, Delaware. He was photographed carrying the Confederate battle flag through the Ohio Clock corridor and past a portrait of abolitionist Charles Sumner, and was arrested along with his son. The FBI had previously included him in a public list of wanted people. Sentenced to three years. Seefried received a full pardon on January 20, 2025
March 19, 2021	Ethan C. Seitz	Federal: Obstruction of an Official Proceeding; Entering ... in a Restricted Building or Grounds; Disorderly ... in a Restricted Building or Grounds; Disorderly Conduct in a Capitol Building; Parading ... in a Capitol Building	Seitz pleaded Not Guilty to all charges. Found Guilty of Obstruction of an Official Proceeding and Disorderly ... in a Restricted Building or Grounds in a Stipulated Bench trial on 8/8/2023. The government moves to vacate the Obstruction charge and the court grants the motion. The conviction on Count One is vacated.	Sentenced on 9/13/2024 to 3 years of probation; 60 days of Home Detention; $25 special assessment; $500 restitution.	Seitz received a full pardon on January 20, 2025
May 17, 2021	Tanner Bryce Sells	Federal: Parading ... in a Capitol Building	Sells pleaded Guilty to the single charge.	Sentenced 1/18/2022 to 24 months probation; 90 days location monitoring/home confinement; Special Assessment of $10.00; restitution of $500.00; Fine of $1,500.00; 50 hours of community service.	Sells received a full pardon on January 20, 2025
June 05, 2024	Andrew Trevor Settles	Federal: Entering ... in a Restricted Building or Grounds; Disorderly ... in a Restricted Building or Grounds; Disorderly Conduct in a Capitol Building; Parading ... in a Capitol Building	Settles pleaded Not Guilty to all charges.	On 1/23/2025, the court grants the government's motion to dismiss the case with prejudice.	
July 19, 2023	Stephen Roy Sexton	Federal: Obstruction of an Official Proceeding; Destruction of Government Property; Entering ... in a Restricted Building or Grounds; Disorderly ... in a Restricted Building or Grounds; Engaging in Physical Violence in a Restricted Building or Grounds; Disorderly Conduct in a Capitol Building; Act of Physical Violence in the Capitol Grounds or Buildings; Parading ... in a Capitol Building	Sexton pleaded Guilty to two charges: Destruction of Government Property and Disorderly ... in a Restricted Building or Grounds. The other charges are dismissed.	Sentenced on 12/16/2024 to 8 Months incarceration; 12 Months of Supervised Release; Special Assessment of $50; $2,000 in Restitution.	Sexton received a full pardon on January 20, 2025
December 07, 2021	Paul Lee Seymour Jr.	Federal: Entering ... in a Restricted Building; Disorderly ... in a Restricted Building; Violent Entry and Disorderly Conduct; Parading ... in a Capitol Building	Seymour pleaded Guilty to one charge: Parading ... in a Capitol Building. The other charges are dismissed.	Sentenced 11/4/2022 to 12 months of probation, 60 hours of community service, $500 restitution.	Seymour received a full pardon on January 20, 2025
December 07, 2021	Paul Lee Seymour Sr.	Federal: Entering ... in a Restricted Building; Disorderly ... in a Restricted Building; Violent Entry and Disorderly Conduct; Parading ... in a Capitol Building	Seymour pleaded Guilty to one charge: Parading ... in a Capitol Building. The other charges are dismissed.	Sentenced 11/4/2022 to 12 months of probation, 60 hours of community service, $500 restitution.	Seymour received a full pardon on January 20, 2025
March 09, 2021	Dale Jeremiah Shalvey	Federal: Civil Disorder; Assaulting ... Certain Officers or Employees; Obstruction of an Official Proceeding; Theft of Personal Property Within Special Maritime and Territorial Jurisdiction; False Statements; Entering ... in a Restricted Building or Grounds; Disorderly ... in a Restricted Building or Grounds; Entering ... on the Floor of Congress; Disorderly Conduct in a Capitol Building; Parading ... in a Capitol Building	Shalvey pleaded Guilty to two charges: Assaulting ... Certain Officers; and Obstruction of an Official Proceeding. The other charges are dismissed.	Sentenced on 5/11/2023 to 41 months of incarceration; 24 months of supervised release; $2,000 restitution; $100 special assessment.	Shalvey received a full pardon on January 20, 2025
December 03, 2021	Daniel Shaw	Federal: Entering ... in a Restricted Building or Grounds; Disorderly ... in a Restricted Building or Grounds; Disorderly Conduct in a Capitol Building; Parading ... in a Capitol Building	Shaw pleaded Guilty to one charge: Parading ... in a Capitol Building. The other charges are dismissed.	Sentenced on 3/17/2023 to 10 days of incarceration; 24 months Probation; 100 hours of community service; a $10 Special Assessment; Restitution in the amount of $500.	Shaw received a full pardon on January 20, 2025
November 01, 2024	Andrew Joseph Shea	Federal: Knowingly Entering or Remaining in any Restricted Building or Grounds Without Lawful Authority; Knowingly, and with intent to impede or disrupt the orderly conduct of Government business or official functions; Disorderly Conduct in a Capitol Building or Grounds; Parading ... in a Capitol Building		On 1/22/2025, the court grants the government's motion to dismiss the case with prejudice.	
February 23, 2021	Alexander Bennett Sheppard	Federal: Obstruction of an Official Proceeding; Entering ... in a Restricted Building or Grounds; Disorderly ... in a Restricted Building or Grounds; Entering ... on the Floor of Congress; Disorderly Conduct in a Capitol Building; Parading ... in a Capitol Building	Sheppard pleaded Not Guilty to all charges. In a Jury trial on 1/26/2023, he was found Guilty on five charges: Obstruction of an Official Proceeding, Entering ... in a Restricted Building or Grounds, Disorderly ... in a Restricted Building or Grounds, Disorderly Conduct in a Capitol Building, Parading ... in a Capitol Building; and Not Guilty on one charge: Entering ... on the Floor of Congress.	Sentenced on 9/5/2023 to 19 months incarceration; 24 months of supervised release; Special assessment of $170; Fine of $1,000; Restitution of $2,000.	Sheppard received a full pardon on January 20, 2025
March 01, 2021	Grayson Sherrill	Federal: Civil Disorder; Assaulting ... Certain Officers Using a Deadly or Dangerous Weapon; Entering ... in a Restricted Building or Grounds with a Deadly or Dangerous Weapon; Disorderly ... in a Restricted Building or Grounds with a Deadly or Dangerous Weapon; Engaging in Physical Violence in a Restricted Building or Grounds with a Deadly or Dangerous Weapon; Act of Physical Violence in the Capitol Grounds or Buildings; Disorderly Conduct in a Capitol Building; Parading ... in a Capitol Building	Sherrill pleaded Guilty to lesser offense of Assaulting ... Certain Officers. The other charges are dismissed.	Sentenced on 5/5/2023 to 7 months incarceration; 12 months supervised release; Special Assessment of $100; Restitution of $2,000.	Sherrill received a full pardon on January 20, 2025
January 19, 2021	Barton Wade Shively	Federal: Assaulting ... Certain Officers; Entering ... Restricted Building or Grounds; Disorderly ... Restricted Building or Grounds; Impeding Ingress and Egress in a Restricted Building or Grounds; Engaging in Physical Violence in a Restricted Building or Grounds; Disorderly Conduct in a Capitol Building; Impeding Passage Through the Capitol Grounds or Buildings; Act of Physical Violence in the Capitol Grounds or Buildings	Not Guilty – all charges	Sentenced to 18 months in prison, 36 months of supervised release, and a fine/restitution of $2,000	Shively, of Mechanicsburg, Pennsylvania, assaulted an officer by striking the officer's hand, head, and shoulder areas. He also assaulted another officer, grabbing their jacket and yelling at them. He was arrested in Harrisburg, Pennsylvania, on January 19, 2021. He pleaded guilty on September 21, 2022, and was sentenced on June 2, 2023.
March 01, 2022	Geoffrey Samuel Shough	Federal: Civil Disorder; Entering ... in a Restricted Building or Grounds; Disorderly ... in a Restricted Building or Grounds; Disorderly Conduct in a Capitol Building; Parading ... in a Capitol Building	Shough pleaded Guilty to one charge: Civil Disorder. The other charges are dismissed.	Sentenced on 3/22/2023 to 6 months of incarceration; 1 year of supervised release; 200 hours of community service; $2,000 restitution; and $100 special assessment.	Shough received a full pardon on January 20, 2025
August 23, 2021	Owen Shroyer	Federal: Entering ... Restricted Building or Grounds; Disorderly ... Restricted Building or Grounds; Disorderly Conduct in Capitol Grounds; Obstruct and Impede Passage Through or Within Capitol Grounds	In 2023, changed plea to guilty. Some charges were dropped.	Sentenced to 60 days’ incarceration, 12 months’ supervised release, $500 restitution	InfoWars host. Charged on August 20, 2021. On September 12, 2023, he was sentenced to 60 days. Shroyer received a full pardon on January 20, 2025.
September 06, 2023	Benjamin Michael Shuler	Federal: Civil Disorder; Assaulting ... Certain Officers; Entering ... in a Restricted Building or Grounds; Disorderly ... in a Restricted Building or Grounds; Engaging in Physical Violence in a Restricted Building or Grounds; Disorderly Conduct in a Capitol Building; Act of Physical Violence in the Capitol Grounds or Buildings	Shuler pleaded Not Guilty to all charges. Pretrial Conference set for 4/16/2025.	On 1/22/2025, the court grants the government's motion to dismiss the case with prejudice	
March 12, 2021	Thomas F. Sibick	Federal: Assaulting ... Certain Officers; Theft (2 counts)	Sibick pleaded Guilty to three charges: Assaulting ... Certain Officers; and two counts of Theft.	Sentenced on 7/28/2023 to 50 months incarceration; 36 months supervised release; Restitution of $7,500.79; special assessment of $225.	Sibick received a full pardon on January 20, 2025
January 15, 2021	Dennis Sidorski	Federal: Entering ... in a Restricted Building; Disorderly ... in a Restricted Building; Violent Entry and Disorderly Conduct in a Capitol Building; Parading ... in a Capitol Building	Sidorski pleaded Guilty to one charge: Disorderly ... in a Restricted Building. The other charges were dismissed.	Sentenced on 6/28/2022 to 100 days of incarceration; 12 months of supervised release; 50 hours of community service; $25 special assessment; $500 restitution.	Sidorski received a full pardon on January 20, 2025
November 05, 2024	Boris Sidow	Federal: Disorderly Conduct in a Capitol Building; Parading ... in a Capitol Building	Sidow pleaded Guilty to both charges.	Sentencing set for 2/21/2025. On 1/22/2025, the court ordered that the case is dismissed without prejudice.	
November 30, 2022	Jordan Siemers	Federal: Entering ... in a Restricted Building or Grounds; Disorderly ... in a Restricted Building or Grounds; Disorderly Conduct in the Capitol Grounds or Buildings; Parading ... in a Capitol Building	Siemers pleaded Guilty to one charge: Parading ... in a Capitol Building. The other charges are dismissed.	Sentenced on 9/11/2023 to 12 Months of Probation; 60 hours of community service; Special Assessment of $10; Restitution of $500; Fine of $1,500.	Siemers received a full pardon on January 20, 2025
June 18, 2021	Geoffrey William Sills	Federal: Assaulting ... Certain Officers Using a Dangerous Weapon (pole-like object, baton); Robbery and Aiding and Abetting (baton); Obstruction of an Official Proceeding and Aiding and Abetting; Civil Disorder; Disorderly ... in a Restricted Building or Grounds with a Deadly or Dangerous Weapon; Engaging in Physical Violence in a Restricted Building or Grounds with a Deadly or Dangerous Weapon; Disorderly Conduct in a Capitol Building; Act of Physical Violence in the Capitol Grounds or Buildings	At a stipulated bench trial on 8/23/2022, Sills was found Guilty of Robbery; Assaulting ... Certain Officers Using a Dangerous Weapon; and Obstruction of an Official Proceeding. The other charges are dismissed.	Sentenced on 3/21/2023 to 52 months incarceration; 36 months supervised release; $2,000 restitution; Special Assessment of $300.	Sills received a full pardon on January 20, 2025
July 25, 2023	Benjamin John Silva	Federal: Civil Disorder; Entering ... in a Restricted Building or Grounds; Disorderly ... in a Restricted Building or Grounds; Engaging in Physical Violence in a Restricted Building or Grounds; Impeding Passage through the Capitol Grounds or Buildings	Silva pleaded Guilty to one charge: Civil Disorder. The other charges are dismissed.	Sentenced on 9/17/2024 to 4 Months of incarceration; 24 months of supervised release; 120 days location monitoring; Special Assessment: $100; Restitution: $2,000; 60 hours of community service.	Silva received a full pardon on January 20, 2025
May 05, 2021	Glen Mitchell Simon	Federal: Entering ... in a Restricted Building; Disorderly ... in a Restricted Building or Grounds; Disorderly Conduct in a Capitol Building; Parading ... in a Capitol Building	Simon pleaded Guilty to one charge: Disorderly ... in a Restricted Building or Grounds. The other charges are dismissed.	Sentenced on 8/12/2022 to 8 months incarceration; 12 months of supervised release; $1,000 fine; $500 restitution; $25 special assessment.	Simon received a full pardon on January 20, 2025
January 28, 2021	Mark Steven Simon	Federal: Entering ... in a Restricted Building or Grounds; Disorderly ... in a Restricted Building or Grounds; Disorderly Conduct in a Capitol Building or Grounds; Parading ... in a Capitol Building	Simon pleaded Guilty to one charge: Parading ... in a Capitol Building. The other charges were dismissed.	Sentenced 12/7/2021 to 35 days incarceration; Special Assessment of $10; Restitution in the amount of $500.	Simon received a full pardon on January 20, 2025
June 29, 2022	Bernard Joseph Sirr	Federal: Civil Disorder; Entering ... in a Restricted Building or Grounds; Disorderly ... in a Restricted Building or Grounds; Engaging in Physical Violence in a Restricted Building or Grounds; Impeding Passage Through the Capitol Grounds or Buildings; Act of Physical Violence in the Capitol Grounds or Buildings	Sirr pleaded Guilty to one charge: Civil Disorder. The other charges are dismissed.	Sentenced on 5/23/2023 to 2 Months of Incarceration; 12 Months of Supervised Release; 6 Months of location monitoring; Special Assessment of $100; restitution of $2,000.	Sirr received a full pardon on January 20, 2025
September 02, 2021	Julia Jeanette Sizer	Federal: Entering ... in a Restricted Building; Disorderly ... in a Restricted Building; Violent Entry and Disorderly Conduct in a Capitol Building; Parading ... in a Capitol Building	Sizer pleaded Guilty to one charge: Parading ... in a Capitol Building. The other charges are dismissed.	Sentenced 2/1/2022 to 12 months probation; $2,000 fine; $10 special assessment; and $500 in restitution.	Sizer received a full pardon on January 20, 2025
November 03, 2022	Brian Douglas Sizer	Federal: Entering ... in a Restricted Building; Disorderly ... in a Restricted Building; Violent Entry and Disorderly Conduct in a Capitol Building; Parading ... in a Capitol Building	Sizer pleaded Guilty to one charge: Parading ... in a Capitol Building. The other charges are dismissed.	Sentenced 4/5/2023 to 12 months Probation; $10 Special Assessment; Restitution of $500.	Sizer received a full pardon on January 20, 2025
August 04, 2021	Tyler Welsh Slaeker	Federal: Entering ... in a Restricted Building or Grounds; Disorderly ... in a Restricted Building or Grounds; Disorderly Conduct in a Capitol Building; Parading ... in a Capitol Building	Slaeker pleaded Guilty to one charge: Entering ... in a Restricted Building or Grounds. The other charges are dismissed.	Sentenced on 1/13/2023 to 36 Months of Probation (first 30 days on home detention); Special Assessment of $25; Restitution of $500; 240 hours of community service.	Slaeker received a full pardon on January 20, 2025
June 05, 2024	Scott Slater, Sr.	Federal: Civil Disorder; Assaulting ... Certain Officers; Entering ... in a Restricted Building or Grounds; Disorderly ... in a Restricted Building or Grounds; Engaging in Physical Violence in a Restricted Building or Grounds; Disorderly Conduct in a Capitol Building; Act of Physical Violence in the Capitol Grounds or Buildings	Slater pleaded Not Guilty to all charges.	On 1/21/2025, the court grants the government's motion to dismiss the case with prejudice.	
June 05, 2024	Scott Alex Slater, Jr.	Federal: Civil Disorder; Assaulting ... Certain Officers Using a Dangerous Weapon; Assaulting ... Certain Officers (4 counts); Entering ... in Restricted Building or Grounds; Disorderly ... in a Restricted Building or Grounds; Engaging in Physical Violence in a Restricted Building or Grounds; Disorderly Conduct in a Capitol Building; Act of Physical Violence in the Capitol Building or Grounds	Slater pleaded Not Guilty to all charges.	On 1/21/2025, the court grants the government's motion to dismiss the case with prejudice.	
October 12, 2022	Richard Slaughter	Federal: Robbery; Assaulting ... Certain Officers Using a Dangerous Weapon; Assaulting ... Certain Officers Using a Dangerous Weapon and Aiding and Abetting; Civil Disorder; Entering ... in a Restricted Building or Grounds with a Deadly or Dangerous Weapon; Disorderly ... in a Restricted Building or Grounds with a Deadly or Dangerous Weapon; Engaging in Physical Violence in a Restricted Building or Grounds with a Deadly or Dangerous Weapon; Act of Physical Violence in the Capitol Grounds or Buildings	Slaughter pleaded Not Guilty to all charges.	Bench trial held and verdict set for 1/28/2025. On 1/21/2025, the court grants the government's motion to dismiss the case with prejudice.	
October 29, 2024	David Slinker	Federal: Theft of Government Property; Entering or Remaining in a Restricted Building or Grounds; Disorderly ... in a Restricted Building or Grounds; Entering or Remaining in Certain Rooms in a Capitol Building; Disorderly Conduct in a Capitol Building or Grounds; Parading ... in a Capitol Building	Slinker pleaded Not Guilty to all charges.	On 1/22/2025, the court grants the government's motion to dismiss the case with prejudice	
September 30, 2022	Mikhail Edward Slye	Federal: Assaulting ... Certain Officers	Slye pleaded Guilty to the charge: Assaulting ... Certain Officers.	Sentenced on 6/15/2023 to 30 months incarceration; 18 months Supervised Release; Restitution of $2000; a $100 Special Assessment.	Slye received a full pardon on January 20, 2025
December 13, 2022	Bryan Shawn Smith	Federal: Civil Disorder; Inflicting Bodily Injury on Certain Officers and Aiding and Abetting; Entering ... in a Restricted Building or Grounds; Disorderly ... in a Restricted Building or Grounds; Engaging in Physical Violence in a Restricted Building or Grounds; Disorderly Conduct in a Capitol Building; Act of Physical Violence in the Capitol Grounds or Buildings	Smith pleaded Not Guilty to all charges. Found Guilty in a Bench trial on 5/10/2024 on all charges but one: Disorderly Conduct in a Capitol Building.	Sentenced on 11/15/2024 to 34 months incarceration; 36 months Supervised Release; fine of $2,000; $285 special assessment.	Smith received a full pardon on January 20, 2025
September 13, 2021	Charles Bradford Smith	Federal: Conspiracy to Obstruct Official Proceeding; Obstruction of an Official Proceeding; Civil Disorder; Assaulting ... Certain Officers Using a Dangerous Weapon and Aiding and Abetting; Entering ... in a Restricted Building or Grounds with a Deadly or Dangerous Weapon; Disorderly ... in a Restricted Building or Grounds with a Deadly or Dangerous Weapon; Impeding Ingress and Egress in a Restricted Building or Grounds; Engaging in Physical Violence in a Restricted Building or Grounds with a Deadly or Dangerous Weapon and Aiding and Abetting; Disorderly Conduct in a Capitol Building or Grounds; Impeding Passage Through the Capitol Grounds or Buildings and Aiding and Abetting; Act of Physical Violence in the Capitol Grounds or Buildings	Smith pleaded Guilty to two charges: Conspiracy to Obstruct Official Proceeding and a lesser offense as to Count 4s, Assaulting ... Certain Officers and Aiding and Abetting. The other charges are dismissed.	Sentenced on 9/23/2022 to 41 months incarceration; 36 months supervised release; $2,000 restitution.	Smith received a full pardon on January 20, 2025
July 29, 2021	Donald John Smith	Federal: Entering ... in a Restricted Building or Grounds; Disorderly ... in a Restricted Building or Grounds; Disorderly Conduct in a Capitol Building; Parading ... in a Capitol Building	Smith pleaded Not Guilty to all charges.	The government moved to dismiss the charges against him and it was granted by the judge on 11/3/2022, no reason put on the record.	
October 27, 2022	Gary Francis Smith	Federal: Entering ... in a Restricted Building; Disorderly ... in a Restricted Building; Violent Entry and Disorderly Conduct in a Capitol Building; Parading ... in a Capitol Building	Smith pleaded Guilty to one charge: Parading ... in a Capitol Building. The other charges are dismissed.	Sentenced on 6/9/2023 to 36 months of Probation; 30 days of location monitoring; $500 in restitution; $10 special assessment; 60 hours of community service.	Smith received a full pardon on January 20, 2025
January 27, 2021	Jeffrey Alexander Smith	Federal: Violent Entry and Disorderly Conduct in a Capitol Building; Parading ... in a Capitol Building; Entering ... in a Restricted Building; Disorderly ... in a Restricted Building	Smith pleaded Guilty to one charge: Parading ... in a Capitol Building. The other charges are dismissed.	Sentenced to 90 days of incarceration; probation of 2 years; special assessment of $10; Restitution of $500; Community service of 200 hours.	Smith received a full pardon on January 20, 2025
May 04, 2022	Justin Michael Smith	Federal: Entering ... in a Restricted Building or Grounds; Disorderly ... in a Restricted Building or Grounds; Disorderly Conduct on Capitol Grounds; Parading ... in a Capitol Building	Smith pleaded Guilty to one charge: Parading ... in a Capitol Building. The other charges are dismissed.	Sentenced on 7/14/2023 to 36 Months Probation; $10 Special Assessment; $500 Restitution; 80 hours of community service. On 8/27/2024, the court finds that he committed six probation violations; probation is revoked and he is sentenced to 120 days incarceration.	Smith received a full pardon on January 20, 2025
January 26, 2024	Marcus Smith	Federal: Destruction of Government Property; Entering ... in a Restricted Building or Grounds; Disorderly ... in a Restricted Building or Grounds; Engaging in Physical Violence in a Restricted Building or Grounds; Disorderly Conduct in a Capitol Building; Act of Physical Violence in the Capitol Grounds or Buildings; Parading ... in a Capitol Building	Smith pleaded Not Guilty to all charges. Found Guilty on all charges on 10/1/2024 in a Jury trial.	Sentenced on 1/17/2025 to 12 months and one day of incarceration; 24 months of supervised release; $21,191 in restitution; $205 special assessment.	Smith received a full pardon on January 20, 2025
October 02, 2024	Morton Irvine Smith	Federal: Entering ... in a Restricted Building or Grounds; Disorderly ... in a Restricted Building or Grounds; Disorderly Conduct in a Capitol Building or Grounds	Smith pleaded Guilty to one charge: Entering ... in a Restricted Building or Grounds.	Sentencing set for 4/21/2025. On 1/22/2025, the court grants the government's motion to dismiss the case with prejudice.	
October 06, 2021	Thomas Harlen Smith	Federal: Civil Disorder (2 counts); Obstruction of an Official Proceeding; Assaulting ... Certain Officers (2 counts); Assaulting ... Certain Officers using a Dangerous Weapon; Entering ... in a Restricted Building or Grounds with a Deadly or Dangerous Weapon; Disorderly ... in a Restricted Building or Grounds with a Deadly or Dangerous Weapon; Engaging in Physical Violence in a Restricted Building or Grounds with a Deadly or Dangerous Weapon; Disorderly Conduct in a Capitol Building; Act of Physical Violence in the Capitol Grounds or Buildings	Smith pleaded Not Guilty to all charges. On 5/5/2023, a jury found him Guilty on all charges.	Sentenced on 10/16/2023 to 108 months incarceration; 36 months of supervised release; Special Assessment of $920; Fine of $37,085; 200 hours of community service.	Smith received a full pardon on January 20, 2025
December 07, 2023	David Evan Smither	Federal: Entering ... in a Restricted Building or Grounds; Disorderly ... in a Restricted Building or Grounds; Disorderly Conduct in a Capitol Building or Grounds; Parading ... in a Capitol Building	Smither pleaded Guilty to two charges: Disorderly Conduct in a Capitol Building or Grounds; Parading ... in a Capitol Building. The other charges are dismissed.	Sentenced on 5/15/2024 to 12 months of probation; $20 Special Assessment; $725 Fine; $500 Restitution; 50 hours of community service.	Smither received a full pardon on January 20, 2025
January 15, 2021	Troy Anthony Smocks	Federal: Threats in Interstate Communications – Contained a threat to kidnap and injure law enforcement officers using a social media service and a threat to kidnap and injure politicians and executives in the technology industry	Guilty – the charge.	14 months of incarceration; 36 months of supervised release and a special assessment of $100. Date: October 22, 2021	He has been charged with 17 other offenses since turning 18. Smocks received a full pardon on January 20, 2025.
August 02, 2024	Nicholas Waldon Smotherman	Federal: Assaulting ... Certain Officers	Smotherman pleaded Guilty to the charge.	Sentencing set for 4/23/2025. On 1/21/2025, the court grants the government's motion to dismiss the case with prejudice.”	
November 21, 2024	Dylan James Smyth	Federal: Obstruction of Law Enforcement During Civil Disorder; Destruction of Federal Property; Knowingly Entering or Remaining in any Restricted Building or Grounds; Disorderly ... in a Restricted Building or Grounds; Disorderly ... in the Capitol Grounds or Buildings		On 1/23/2025, the court grants the government's motion to dismiss the case with prejudice.	
September 05, 2023	Lewis Wayne Snoots	Federal: Civil Disorder; Assaulting ... Certain Officers (2 counts); Entering or Remaining in a Restricted Building or Grounds; Disorderly ... in a Restricted Building or Grounds; Engaging in Physical Violence in a Restricted Building or Grounds; Act of Physical Violence in the Capitol Grounds or Buildings	Snoots pleaded Guilty to one charge: Assaulting ... Certain Officers. The other charges are dismissed.	Sentenced on 1/17/2025 to 71 months of incarceration; 36 months of supervised release; $96,927.18 in restitution; $100 special assessment.	Snoots received a full pardon on January 20, 2025
January 04, 2022	Robert Thomas Snow	Federal: Entering ... in a Restricted Building or Grounds; Disorderly ... in a Restricted Building or Grounds; Disorderly Conduct in a Capitol Building; Parading ... in a Capitol Building	Snow pleaded Guilty to one charge: Parading ... in a Capitol Building. The other charges are dismissed.	Sentenced 7/7/2022 to 12 months of Probation; $10 Special Assessment and Restitution of $500; 60 hours of community service. During the sentencing hearing, the Court advised Mr. Snow that if he made his required payments and met his community service obligations, the Court would entertain a motion for early termination of probation. Having completed the above, the court granted his request and his sentence of probation was terminated on 8/15/2022.	Snow received a full pardon on January 20, 2025
October 16, 2024	Jeffrey Dale Snyder	Federal: Civil Disorder; Assaulting ... Certain Officers Using a Dangerous Weapon; Theft of Government Property; Entering ... in a Restricted Building or Grounds; Disorderly ... in a Restricted Building or Grounds; Disorderly Conduct in a Capitol Building; Act of Physical Violence in the Capitol Grounds or Buildings		On 1/22/2025, the court grants the government's motion to dismiss the case with prejudice.	
September 01, 2022	Kellye SoRelle	Federal: Conspiracy to Obstruct an Official Proceeding; Obstruction of an Official Proceeding and Aiding and Abetting; Entering ... in a Restricted Building or Grounds; Obstruction of Justice-Tampering with Documents	SoRelle pleaded Guilty to two charges: Entering ... in a Restricted Building or Grounds; Obstruction of Justice-Tampering with Documents. The other charges are dismissed.	Sentenced on 1/17/2025 to 12 months incarceration; supervised release of 36 months; special assessment of $125; restitution of $2,000.	SoRelle received a full pardon on January 20, 2025
August 23, 2022	Weston Sobotka	Federal: Entering ... in a Restricted Building or Grounds; Disorderly ... in a Restricted Building or Grounds; Disorderly Conduct in a Capitol Building; Parading ... in a Capitol Building	Sobotka pleaded Guilty to Parading ... in a Capitol Building. The other charges are dismissed.	Sentenced on 4/18/2023 to 36 Months Probation; 15 Days Incarceration To Be Served Intermittently 1 Weekend Per Month; Restitution Of $500; Special Assessment Of $10; 50 hours of community service.	Sobotka received a full pardon on January 20, 2025
October 25, 2021	Kim Michael Sorgente	Federal: Civil Disorder; Entering ... in a Restricted Building or Grounds; Disorderly ... in a Restricted Building or Grounds; Obstruction of an Official Proceeding	Sorgente pleaded Not Guilty to all charges. Court dismisses Obstruction charge on 8/12/2024.	On 1/22/2025, the court grants the government's motion to dismiss the case with prejudice	
April 07, 2021	Jeremy Ryan Sorvisto	Federal: Entering ... in a Restricted Building or Grounds; Disorderly ... in a Restricted Building or Grounds; Disorderly Conduct in a Capitol Building; Parading ... a Capitol Building	Sorvisto pleaded Guilty to one charge: Parading ... a Capitol Building. The other charges were dismissed.	Sentenced 12/15/2021 to 30 days in jail; $500 in restitution; Special Assessment of $10.	Sorvisto received a full pardon on January 20, 2025
June 02, 2021	Audrey Ann Southard-Rumsey	Federal: Civil Disorder; Assaulting ... Certain Officers; Obstruction of an Official Proceeding; Entering ... in a Restricted Building or Grounds; Disorderly ... in a Restricted Building or Grounds; Engaging in Physical Violence in a Restricted Building or Grounds; Disorderly Conduct in a Capitol Building; Act of Physical Violence in the Capitol Grounds or Buildings; Parading ... in a Capitol Building	Southard-Rumsey pleaded Not Guilty to all charges. She was found Guilty on seven charges in a stipulated Bench trial on 1/27/2023: Civil Disorder (3 counts); Assaulting ... Certain Officers (3 counts); Obstruction of an Official Proceeding. The other charges are dismissed.	Sentenced on 7/14/2023 to 72 months incarceration; 36 months supervised release; $700 special assessment.	Southard-Rumsey received a full pardon on January 20, 2025
October 13, 2023	Troy Spackman	Federal: Civil Disorder; Assaulting ... Certain Officers Using a Dangerous Weapon; Entering ... in a Restricted Building or Grounds with a Deadly or Dangerous Weapon; Disorderly ... in a Restricted Building or Grounds with a Deadly or Dangerous Weapon; Engaging in Physical Violence in a Restricted Building or Grounds with a Deadly or Dangerous Weapon; Disorderly Conduct in a Capitol Building; Act of Physical Violence in the Capitol Building or Grounds	Spackman pleaded Not Guilty to all charges. Jury Trial to commence on 2/10/2025.	On 1/21/2025, the court grants the government's motion to dismiss the case with prejudice	
October 07, 2021	Edward T. Spain Jr.	Federal: Entering ... in a Restricted Building or Grounds; Disorderly ... in a Restricted Building or Grounds; Disorderly Conduct in a Capitol Building; Parading ... in a Capitol Building	Spain pleaded Guilty to one charge: Parading ... in a Capitol Building. The other charges are dismissed.	Sentenced on 5/4/2022 to 36 months of probation, 60 hours community service; $500 restitution and $10 special assessment.	Spain received a full pardon on January 20, 2025
October 31, 2024	Aaron Spanier	Federal: Entering ... in a Restricted Building or Grounds; Disorderly ... in a Restricted Building or Grounds; Disorderly Conduct in a Capitol Building; Parading ... in a Capitol Building		On 1/21/2025, the court grants the government's motion to dismiss the case with prejudice.	
January 19, 2021	Michael Sparks	Federal: Obstruction of an Official Proceeding; Civil Disorder; Entering ... in a Restricted Building or Grounds; Disorderly ... in a Restricted Building or Grounds; Disorderly Conduct in a Capitol Building; Parading ... in a Capitol Building	Sparks pleaded Not Guilty to all charges. Found Guilty on all charges in a Jury trial on 3/1/2024. On 8/5/2024, the Court granted the motion to dismiss the Obstruction charge.	Sentenced on 8/27/2024 to 53 months of Incarceration; 36 months of Supervised Release (with conditions); $170 Special Assessment; $2,000 Restitution.	Sparks received a full pardon on January 20, 2025
June 22, 2022	Hatchet M. Speed	Federal: Obstruction of an Official Proceeding and Aiding and Abetting; Entering ... in a Restricted Building; Disorderly ... in a Restricted Building; Disorderly Conduct in a Capitol Building; Parading ... in a Capitol Building	Speed pleaded Not Guilty to all charges. Bench Trial held from 3/2/2023-3/7/2023. Speed was found Guilty on all charges.	Sentenced on 5/8/2023 to 48 Months of Incarceration; 36 Months of Supervised Release; Special Assessment of $170; Restitution of $2,000; Fine of $10,000.	Speed received a full pardon on January 20, 2025
January 19, 2021	Christopher Raphael Spencer	Federal: Obstruction of an Official Proceeding and Aiding and Abetting; Entering ... in a Restricted Building or Grounds; Disorderly ... in a Restricted Building or Grounds; Disorderly Conduct in a Capitol Building; Parading ... in a Capitol Building	Spencer pleaded Not Guilty to all charges. Found Guilty on all charges in a Stipulated Bench trial on 2/21/2024. Court grants order to dismiss Obstruction charge on 8/13/2024.	Sentenced on 12/9/2024 to 9 Months incarceration; 12 Months of Supervised Release; Special Assessment of $70.	Spencer received a full pardon on January 20, 2025
February 08, 2021	Virginia Marie Spencer	Federal: Entering ... in a Restricted Building or Grounds; Disorderly ... in a Restricted Building or Grounds; Disorderly Conduct in a Capitol Building; Parading ... in a Capitol Building	Spencer pleaded Guilty to one charge: Parading ... in a Capitol Building. The other charges were dismissed.	Sentenced 1/7/2022 to 3 months incarceration; $10 special assessment; $500 restitution.	Spencer received a full pardon on January 20, 2025
February 10, 2021	Paul Spigelmyer	Federal: Entering ... in a Restricted Building; Disorderly ... in a Restricted Building; Violent Entry and Disorderly Conduct in a Capitol Building; Parading ... in a Capitol Building	Spigelmyer pleaded Guilty to one charge: Parading ... in a Capitol Building. The other charges are dismissed.	Sentenced 10/28/2022 to 24 months of probation; first 45 days of the probationary period will be spent on home detention; 60 hours community service; $500 restitution; $10 special assessment.	Spigelmyer received a full pardon on January 20, 2025
March 05, 2024	Michael Sposite	Federal: Obstruction of an Official Proceeding; Entering ... in a Restricted Building or Grounds; Disorderly ... in a Restricted Building or Grounds; Disorderly Conduct in a Capitol Building; Parading ... in a Capitol Building	Sposite pleaded Guilty to one charge: Parading ... in a Capitol Building. Jury Trial set for 4/15/2025 on remaining counts.	On 1/21/2025, the court grants the government's motion to dismiss the case with prejudice	
March 03, 2021	Yvonne St Cyr	Federal: Civil Disorder; Entering ... in a Restricted Building or Grounds; Disorderly ... in a Restricted Building or Grounds; Disorderly ... in a Restricted Building or Grounds; Disorderly Conduct in a Capitol Building; Parading ... in a Capitol Building	St Cyr pleaded Not Guilty to all charges. Found Guilty on all charges in a Jury trial on 3/10/2023.	Sentenced on 9/13/2023 to 30 months incarceration; 36 months supervised release; special assessment of $270; fine of $1,000; restitution of $2,000.	St Cyr received a full pardon on January 20, 2025
June 16, 2023	Alan Michael St. Onge	Federal: Civil Disorder (2 counts)	St. Onge pleaded Guilty to the two charges.	Sentenced on 7/9/2024 to 18 months incarceration; 36 months of supervised release; $2,000 in restitution; $200 special assessment. St.	Onge received a full pardon on January 20, 2025
July 27, 2023	Michael St. Pierre	Federal: Civil disorder (felony); destruction of government property; Entering ... Restricted Building or Grounds; Disorderly ... Restricted Building or Grounds; engaging in physical violence in a restricted building or grounds and committing an act of physical violence in the Capitol grounds or buildings.	St. Pierre pleaded Not Guilty to all charges.	Bench trial verdict on 10/9/2024 found him Guilty on four charges: Civil Disorder; Destruction of Government Property; Disorderly Conduct in a Capitol Building; Act of Physical Violence in the Capitol Grounds or Buildings. Not Guilty on the other three. Sentencing set for 3/14/2025. On 1/21/2025, the court grants the government's motion to dismiss the case with prejudice	
March 04, 2021	Lawrence Earl Stackhouse	Federal: Entering ... in a Restricted Building; Disorderly ... in a Restricted Building; Violent Entry and Disorderly Conduct in a Capitol Building; Parading ... in a Capitol Building	Stackhouse pleaded Guilty to one charge: Parading ... in a Capitol Building. The other charges are dismissed.	Sentenced on 6/17/2022 to 36 months of Probation; 14 days intermittent confinement; 90 days home confinement; $10 special assessment; restitution of $500.	Stackhouse received a full pardon on January 20, 2025
January 14, 2021	Peter Francis Stager	Federal: Obstruction of an Official Proceeding and Aiding and Abetting; Assaulting ... Certain Officers Using a Dangerous Weapon; Civil Disorder; Entering ... Restricted Building or Grounds with a Deadly or Dangerous Weapon; Disorderly ... Restricted Building or Grounds with a Deadly or Dangerous Weapon; Engaging in Physical Violence in a Restricted Building or Grounds with a Deadly or Dangerous Weapon; Violent Entry and Disorderly Conduct in a Capitol Building	Pleaded guilty to assaulting, resisting, or impeding certain officers using a deadly or dangerous weapon.	Sentenced to 52 months in prison on July 24, 2023. He was also ordered to serve 36 months of supervised release and pay $2,000.	Stager, 44, of Conway, Arkansas, watched as co-defendants attacked the police line that had been defending the archway opening to a corridor leading from the Lower West Terrace to the interior of the Capitol building and dragged a police officer, facedown and headfirst, out of the line and into the crowd of rioters. Once the others had dragged the officer into the crowd, Stager raised the flagpole that he was carrying and beat the downed police officer, striking him at least three times.
February 07, 2024	Matthew Stallings	Federal: Civil Disorder; Assaulting, Resisting, Impeding Certain Officers Using a Dangerous Weapon and Inflicting Bodily Injury on Certain Officers; Entering ... in a Restricted Building or Grounds with a Deadly or Dangerous Weapon Resulting in Significant Bodily Injury; Disorderly ... in a Restricted Building or Grounds with a Deadly or Dangerous Weapon Resulting in Significant Bodily Injury; Engaging in Physical Violence in a Restricted Building or Grounds with a Deadly or Dangerous Weapon Resulting in Significant Bodily Injury; Disorderly Conduct in the Capitol Grounds or Buildings; Act of Physical Violence in the Capitol Grounds or Buildings	Stallings pleaded Not Guilty to all charges. Jury Trial set for 2/24/2025.	On 1/23/2025, the court grants the government's motion to dismiss the case with prejudice	
February 16, 2022	Shelly Stallings	Federal: Civil Disorder; Assaulting ... Certain Officers Using a Dangerous Weapon; Entering ... in a Restricted Building or Grounds with a Deadly or Dangerous Weapon; Disorderly ... in a Restricted Building or Grounds with a Deadly or Dangerous Weapon; Engaging in Physical Violence in a Restricted Building or Grounds with a Deadly or Dangerous Weapon; Disorderly Conduct in the Capitol Grounds or Buildings; Act of Physical Violence in the Capitol Grounds or Buildings	Stallings pleaded Guilty to all charges.	Sentenced on 4/7/2023 to 24 months of incarceration; 36 months of supervised release; $2,000 restitution; $520 special assessment.	Stallings received a full pardon on January 20, 2025
March 07, 2024	Eric Richard Staples, Jr.	Federal: Entering ... in a Restricted Building or Grounds; Disorderly ... in a Restricted Building or Grounds; Disorderly Conduct in a Capitol Building or Grounds; Parading ... in a Capitol Building	Staples pleaded Guilty to one charge: Entering ... in a Restricted Building or Grounds. The other charges are dismissed.	Sentenced 9/23/2024 to 24 Months of Probation with 2 months location monitoring; Special Assessment: $25; Restitution: $500; 60 hours of community service.	Staples received a full pardon on January 20, 2025
August 14, 2023	David Scott Stapp	Federal: Entering ... in a Restricted Building or Grounds; Disorderly ... in a Restricted Building or Grounds; Disorderly Conduct in a Capitol Building or Grounds; Parading ... in a Capitol Building	Stapp pleaded Guilty to two charges: Disorderly Conduct in a Capitol Building or Grounds; Parading ... in a Capitol Building.	Sentencing reset for 2/6/2025. On 1/22/2025, the court grants the government's motion to dismiss the case with prejudice	
December 20, 2022	Jacquelyn Starer	Federal: Civil Disorder; Assaulting ... Certain Officers; Entering ... in a Restricted Building or Grounds; Disorderly ... in a Restricted Building or Grounds; Engaging in Physical Violence in a Restricted Building or Grounds; Disorderly Conduct in a Capitol Building; Act of Physical Violence in the Capitol Grounds or Buildings; Parading ... in a Capitol Building	Starer pleaded Guilty to all charges.	Sentenced on 9/5/2024 to 9 months incarceration; 24 months supervised release; 9 months location monitoring; $305 special assessment; $2,000 restitution; $2,000 fine.	Starer received a full pardon on January 20, 2025. Her state Board of Registration in Medicine cited her violent participation in the riot when refusing to renew her license to practice medicine on July 16, 2026.
August 12, 2024	Andrew Kade Starling	Federal: Entering ... in a Restricted Building or Grounds; Disorderly ... in a Restricted Building or Grounds; Disorderly Conduct in a Capitol Building; Parading ... in a Capitol Building	Starling pleaded Not Guilty to all charges.	On 1/21/2025, the court grants the government's motion to dismiss the case with prejudice	
March 09, 2021	Ezekiel Kurt Stecher	Federal: Civil Disorder; Entering ... in a Restricted Building or Grounds; Disorderly ... in a Restricted Building or Grounds; Engaging in Physical Violence in a Restricted Building or Grounds; Disorderly Conduct in a Capitol Building; Act of Physical Violence in the Capitol Grounds or Buildings	Stecher pleaded Guilty to one charge: Civil Disorder. The other charges are dismissed.	Sentenced on 1/3/2024 to 60 days incarceration; 2 years of Supervised Release; $2,000 Restitution; $100 Special Assessment.	Stecher received a full pardon on January 20, 2025
October 16, 2024	Donald Charles Stedman, Jr.	Federal: Entering ... in a Restricted Building or Grounds; Disorderly ... in a Restricted Building or Grounds; Disorderly Conduct in a Capitol Building; Parading ... in a Capitol Building	Stedman pleaded Not Guilty to all charges.	On 1/27/2025, the court grants the government's motion to dismiss the case with prejudice.	
January 21, 2021	Patrick Alonzo Stedman	Federal: Obstruction of an Official Proceeding; Entering ... in a Restricted Building or Grounds; Disorderly ... in a Restricted Building or Grounds; Disorderly Conduct in a Capitol Building; Parading ... in a Capitol Building	Stedman pleaded Not Guilty to all charges. Found Guilty in a jury trial on 6/9/2023 on all charges.	Sentenced on 9/8/2023 to 48 months incarceration; 36 months of supervised release; $2,000 in restitution; $20,000 fine; $170 special assessment. On 9/9/2024, the USCA vacated the Obstruction conviction. Resentenced on 12/19/2024 to Time Served; Supervised Release Of 12 Months (With Conditions); $70 Special Assessment; Restitution of $2,000; Fine of $20,000.	Stedman received a full pardon on January 20, 2025
February 17, 2021	Laura Steele	Federal: Conspiracy to Obstruct an Official Proceeding; Obstruction of an Official Proceeding and Aiding and Abetting; Conspiracy to Prevent an Officer from Discharging Any Duties; Destruction of Government Property and Aiding and Abetting; Entering ... in a Restricted Building or Grounds; Civil Disorder and Aiding and Abetting; Tampering with Documents or Proceedings and Aiding and Abetting	Steele pleaded Not Guilty to all charges. Jury trial verdict on 3/20/2023 finds Steele Guilty on all counts.	Sentenced on 9/15/2023 to twelve months and one day of incarceration; 36 months of supervised release; home detention for the first six months of supervision; special assessment of $625; 100 hours of community service.	Steele received a full pardon on January 20, 2025
January 20, 2021	Melody Steele-Smith	Federal: Obstruction of an Official Proceeding; Entering ... in a Restricted Building or Grounds; Disorderly ... in a Restricted Building or Grounds; Entering ... in Certain Rooms in the Capitol Building; Disorderly Conduct in a Capitol Building	Steele-Smith pleaded Guilty to one charge: Entering ... in a Restricted Building or Grounds. The other charges are dismissed.	Sentenced 6/16/2023 to 36 months Probation with 90 days home detention; $500 Restitution; and $25 Special Assessment.	Steele-Smith received a full pardon on January 20, 2025
April 29, 2024	Edward Steen	Federal: Entering or Remaining in a Restricted Building or Grounds; Disorderly ... in a Restricted Building or Grounds; Disorderly Conduct in a Capitol Building; Parading, Picketing, or Demonstrating in a Capitol Building	Steen pleaded Guilty to two charges: Disorderly Conduct in a Capitol Building; Parading, Picketing, or Demonstrating in a Capitol Building.	Sentencing set for 3/12/2025. On 1/21/2025, the court grants the government's motion to dismiss the case with prejudice	
April 29, 2024	Sandra Steen	Federal: Entering or Remaining in a Restricted Building or Grounds; Disorderly ... in a Restricted Building or Grounds; Disorderly Conduct in a Capitol Building; Parading, Picketing, or Demonstrating in a Capitol Building	Trial set for 3/10/2025.	On 1/21/2025, the court grants the government's motion to dismiss the case with prejudice	
May 26, 2022	Devin Steiner	Federal: Entering ... in a Restricted Building or Grounds; Disorderly ... in a Restricted Building or Grounds; Disorderly Conduct in a Capitol Building; Parading ... in a Capitol Building.	Steiner pleaded Guilty to one charge: Parading ... in a Capitol Building. The other charges are dismissed.	Sentenced on 3/23/2023 to 30 days of incarceration; 36 months of probation; $500 fine; $500 in restitution; $10 special assessment.	Steiner received a full pardon on January 20, 2025
April 30, 2021	Brian E. Stenz	Federal: Entering ... in a Restricted Building; Disorderly ... in a Restricted Building; Violent Entry and Disorderly Conduct in a Capitol Building; Parading ... in a Capitol Building	Stenz pleaded Guilty to one charge: Parading ... in a Capitol Building. The other charges are dismissed.	Sentenced 2/17/2022 to 36 months of probation, including 14 days intermittent confinement; two months of home detention/location monitoring; $2,500 fine; $500 restitution; $10 special assessment.	Stenz received a full pardon on January 20, 2025
January 29, 2021	Michael Stepakoff	Federal: Entering ... in a Restricted Building; Disorderly ... in a Restricted Building; Violent Entry and Disorderly Conduct in a Capitol Building; Parading ... in a Capitol Building	Stepakoff pleaded Guilty to one charge: Parading ... in a Capitol Building. The other charges are dismissed.	Sentenced 1/20/2022 to 12 months of Probation with 60 days location monitoring; fine of $742; Special Assessment $10; Restitution of $500; 60 hours community service.	Stepakoff received a full pardon on January 20, 2025
March 29, 2023	Stacey Lynn Stephens	Federal: Entering ... in a Restricted Building or Grounds; Disorderly ... in a Restricted Building or Grounds; Disorderly Conduct on Capitol Grounds; Parading ... in any of the Capitol Buildings.	Stephens pleaded Guilty to one charge: Parading ... in any of the Capitol Buildings. The other charges are dismissed.	Sentenced on 10/31/2023 to 14 days incarceration; $500 fine; $500 restitution; $10 special assessment.	Stephens received a full pardon on January 20, 2025
February 05, 2021	Tristan Chandler Stevens	Federal: Assaulting ... Certain Officers and Aiding and Abetting; Assaulting ... Certain Officers Using a Dangerous Weapon; Obstruction of an Official Proceeding and Aiding and Abetting; Civil Disorder; Disorderly ... in a Restricted Building or Grounds with a Deadly or Dangerous Weapon; Engaging in Physical Violence in a Restricted Building or Grounds with a Deadly or Dangerous Weapon; Disorderly Conduct in a Capitol Building; Act of Physical Violence in the Capitol Grounds or Buildings	Stevens pleaded Not Guilty to all charges. A Bench Trial was held 8/29/2022-9/7/2022. On 9/13/2022 Stevens was found guilty on nine charges - five felony charges and four misdemeanor charges. Not Guilty of Obstruction of an Official Proceeding.	Sentenced 3/10/2023 to 5 years incarceration; 2 years supervised release; Special Assessment of $570; Restitution of $2,000.	Stevens received a full pardon on January 20, 2025
December 20, 2023	Matthew Lawrence Stickney	Federal: Entering ... in a Restricted Building or Grounds; Disorderly ... in a Restricted Building or Grounds; Disorderly Conduct in a Capitol Building or Grounds; Parading ... in a Capitol Building; Entering ... in Certain Rooms in the Capitol Building	Stickney pleaded Not Guilty to all charges.	Jury trial set for 4/7/2025. On 1/21/2025, the court grants the government's motion to dismiss the case with prejudice	
January 15, 2021	Justin Stoll	Federal: Transmission in Interstate Commerce of a Threat to Injure	Stoll pleaded Guilty to the charge.	Sentenced on 7/27/2022 in Cincinnati before Judge Susan J. Dlott: 24 months probation; $100 special assessment. On 5/23/2024, Stoll was discharged from supervision and the proceedings in the case were terminated.	Stoll received a full pardon on January 20, 2025
September 14, 2021	Tara Aileen Stottlemyer	Federal: Obstruction of an Official Proceeding and Aiding and Abetting; Entering ... in a Restricted Building or Grounds; Disorderly ... in a Restricted Building or Grounds; Entering ... on the Floor of Congress; Disorderly Conduct in a Capitol Building; Parading ... in a Capitol Building	Stottlemyer pleaded Guilty to one charge: Obstruction of an Official Proceeding. The other charges are dismissed.	Sentenced on 5/11/2023 to 8 months of incarceration; 8 months of home detention; 24 months supervised release; $100 special assessment; $2,000 restitution.	Stottlemyer received a full pardon on January 20, 2025
March 19, 2021	Jordan Kenneth Stotts	Federal: Entering ... Restricted Building or Grounds; Disorderly ... Restricted Building or Grounds; Disorderly Conduct in a Capitol Building; Parading ... in a Capitol Building	Guilty – one charge: Parading ... in a Capitol Building. The other charges were dismissed.	24 months' probation with conditions and 60 days' home detention, $500 restitution, and 60 hours of community service. Date: Sentenced on November 9, 2021	31-year-old man from Moorhead, Minnesota. FBI agents had received a tip from people that had viewed the man's entries on the Facebook website, which had photos, statements, and videos of him in Washington, D.C., on January 6 and inside the Capitol Rotunda during the riots.
July 10, 2023	William Stover	Federal: Civil Disorder; Entering ... in a Restricted Building or Grounds; Disorderly ... in a Restricted Building or Grounds; Impeding Passage Through the Capitol Grounds or Buildings	Stover pleaded Guilty to one charge: Civil Disorder. The other charges are dismissed.	Sentenced on 7/9/2024 to six months incarceration; 36 months of supervised release; $2,000 in restitution; $100 special assessment; 100 hours of community service.	Stover received a full pardon on January 20, 2025
January 25, 2021	Brandon Straka	Federal: Disorderly Conduct in a Capitol Building	Guilty – the single charge.	Sentenced on December 17, 2021	45-year-old hairstylist from New York City, founder of the WalkAway campaign, arrested in Omaha, Nebraska by the FBI. The FBI was sent multiple screenshots from his Twitter account, which both endorsed the attack and described his involvement with it, including a video in which he encouraged other rioters to take a shield from a police officer. Straka received a full pardon on January 20, 2025.
January 18, 2021	John Herbert Strand	Federal: Obstruction of an Official Proceeding; Entering ... in a Restricted Building or Grounds; Disorderly ... in a Restricted Building or Grounds; Disorderly Conduct in a Capitol Building; Parading ... in a Capitol Building	Strand pleaded Not Guilty to all charges. A trial by jury on 9/27/2022 found him guilty on all charges.	Sentenced on 6/1/2023 to 32 months incarceration; 36 months of supervised release; a special assessment of $170; Restitution of $2,000; a $10,000 fine.	Strand received a full pardon on January 20, 2025
January 22, 2021	Kevin Michael Strong	Federal: Entering ... in a Restricted Building or Grounds; Disorderly ... in a Restricted Building or Grounds; Disorderly Conduct in a Capitol Building; Parading ... in a Capitol Building.	Strong pleaded Guilty to one charge: Parading ... in a Capitol Building. The other charges are dismissed.	Sentenced 3/7/2022 to 24 months of probation, including 30 days of home detention; $500 restitution; $10 special assessment; 60 hours community service.	Strong received a full pardon on January 20, 2025
March 6, 2021	Isaac Steve Sturgeon	Federal: Obstruction of an Official Proceeding and Aiding and Abetting; Assaulting ... Certain Officers; Civil Disorder; Entering ... Restricted Building or Grounds; Disorderly ... Restricted Building or Grounds; Engaging in Physical Violence in a Restricted Building or Grounds; Obstructing, or Impeding Passage Through or Within, the Grounds or Any of the Capitol Buildings; Engaging in an Act of Physical Violence in the Grounds or Any of the Capitol Buildings	Not Guilty – all charges	Sentenced to 72 months’ incarceration, 36 months’ supervised release, $2,000 restitution	32-year-old Montana man, allegedly shoved a metal barricade into multiple police officers at the Capitol. Traveled to and was deported from Kenya after the insurrection.
November 16, 2023	Lee Stutts	Federal: Civil Disorder; Assaulting ... Certain Officers (7 counts); Assaulting ... Certain Officers Using a Dangerous Weapon (2 counts); Entering ... in a Restricted Building or Grounds with a Deadly or Dangerous Weapon; Disorderly ... in a Restricted Building or Grounds with a Deadly or Dangerous Weapon; Engaging in Physical Violence in a Restricted Building or Grounds with a Deadly or Dangerous Weapon; Disorderly Conduct in a Capitol Building; Act of Physical Violence in the Capitol Grounds or Buildings	Stutts pleaded Not Guilty to all charges.	Jury trial set for 3/17/2025. On 1/22/2025, the court ordered that the case is dismissed without prejudice	
January 22, 2021	Marissa A. Suarez	Federal: Obstruction of an Official Proceeding; Entering ... in a Restricted Building or Grounds; Disorderly ... in a Restricted Building or Grounds; Entering ... in Certain Rooms in the Capitol Building; Disorderly Conduct in a Capitol Building; Parading ... in a Capitol Building	Suarez pleaded Guilty to one charge: Parading ... in a Capitol Building. The other charges are dismissed.	Sentenced 7/12/2022 to 36 months of probation; $500 Restitution; $2,000 fine; $10 special assessment; 60 hours community service.	Suarez received a full pardon on January 20, 2025
July 18, 2023	Chad Dustin Suenram	Federal: Entering ... in a Restricted Building or Grounds; Disorderly ... in a Restricted Building or Grounds; Disorderly Conduct in a Capitol Building or Grounds; Parading ... in a Capitol Building	Suenram pleaded Guilty to one charge: Entering ... in a Restricted Building or Grounds. The other charges are dismissed.	Sentenced on 10/21/2024 to 24 months of probation; 14 days intermittent confinement; Special Assessment of $25; Restitution of $500; 150 hours of community service.	Suenram received a full pardon on January 20, 2025
August 04, 2022	Derek Sulenta	Federal: Parading ... in a Capitol Building	Sulenta pleaded Guilty to the single charge.	Sentenced 2/22/2023 to 14 days incarceration; 60 days community service; $500 restitution; Special assessment of $10.	Sulenta received a full pardon on January 20, 2025
March 10, 2021	Ryan Seth Suleski	Federal: Entering ... in a Restricted Building or Grounds; Theft of Government Property	Suleski pleaded Guilty to two charges: Entering ... in a Restricted Building or Grounds, and Theft of Government Property.	Sentenced on 10/14/2022 to 60 days incarceration; $500 restitution; $50 special assessment; 60 hours community service.	Suleski received a full pardon on January 20, 2025
January 14, 2021	John Earle Sullivan (Jayden X)	Federal: Obstruction of an Official Proceeding; Civil Disorder; Entering ... Restricted Building or Grounds; Disorderly ... Restricted Building or Grounds; Disorderly Conduct in a Capitol Building; Parading ... in a Capitol Building; Aiding and Abetting	Stager pleaded Guilty to one charge: Assaulting ... Certain Officers Using a Dangerous Weapon and Aiding and Abetting. The other charges are dismissed.	Sentenced on 7/24/2023 to 52 months incarceration; 3 years of supervised release; Special Assessment: $100; Restitution: $2,000.	Founder of anti-police brutality and pro-racial justice group Insurgence USA. Arrested briefly before being released. He was charged over the content in his videos where he appears to encourage the rioters and excitedly celebrating them advancing through the Capitol. He had previously claimed that he was there to document the actions of the protestors, stating that he was only pretending to be a participant to blend in. Pundits such as Rudy Giuliani and Mo Brooks seized upon his arrest to amplify claims about the involvement of the left in the riot. Despite being called a Black Lives Matter activist and left-wing activist, Black Lives Matter-Utah has denied he is a member, and some left-wing activists have treated him with suspicion in the past due to him stirring trouble and his brother being a pro-Trump activist. The arrest document stated he had made a statement outside the Capitol about "burning this shit down" and "ripping Trump out of office" during a speech he made in August 2020 while pointing to the White House. Sullivan received a full pardon on January 20, 2025.
November 04, 2024	Eric Sun	Federal: Disorderly Conduct in a Capitol Building; Parading ... in a Capitol Building	Sun pleaded Guilty to both charges.	Sentencing set for 5/8/2025. On 1/27/2025, the court grants the government's motion to dismiss the case with prejudice.	
May 19, 2021	Traci J. Sunstrum	Federal: Parading ... in a Capitol Building	Sunstrum pleaded Guilty to Parading ... in a Capitol Building.	Sentenced 2/24/2022 to 3 years of probation; 30 days home detention/location monitoring; $10 special assessment; $500 in restitution.	Sunstrum received a full pardon on January 20, 2025
January 13, 2021	Douglas Sweet	Federal: Entering ... in a Restricted Building; Disorderly ... in a Restricted Building; Violent Entry and Disorderly Conduct in a Capitol Building; Parading ... in a Capitol Building	Sweet pleaded Guilty to one charge: Parading ... in a Capitol Building. The other charges were dismissed.	Sentenced 11/9/2021 to 36 months of probation with one month home detention; restitution of $500.00; Special Assessment of $10; 60 hours community service.	Sweet received a full pardon on January 20, 2025
August 20, 2024	Dylan Ray Swinehart	Federal: Entering ... in a Restricted Building or Grounds; Disorderly ... in a Restricted Building or Grounds; Disorderly Conduct in a Capitol Building or Grounds; Parading ... in a Capitol Building		On 1/22/2025, the court grants the government's motion to dismiss the case with prejudice.	
November 30, 2022	Ryan Swoope	Federal: Civil Disorder; Assaulting ... Certain Officers Using a Dangerous Weapon; Entering ... in a Restricted Building or Grounds with a Deadly or Dangerous Weapon; Disorderly ... in a Restricted Building or Grounds with a Deadly or Dangerous Weapon; Engaging in Physical Violence in a Restricted Building or Grounds with a Deadly or Dangerous Weapon; Disorderly Conduct in a Capitol Building; Act of Physical Violence in the Capitol Grounds or Buildings; Parading ... in a Capitol Building	Swoope pleaded Guilty to one charge: Assaulting ... Certain Officers Using a Dangerous Weapon. The other charges are dismissed.	Sentenced on 1/9/2024 to 51 Months of Incarceration; 24 Months of Supervised Release; Special Assessment of $100; Restitution of $2,000.	Swoope received a full pardon on January 20, 2025
December 13, 2023	Kimberly Sylvester	Federal: Disorderly Conduct on Capitol Grounds; Parading ... in any of the Capitol Buildings	Sylvester pleaded Guilty to the two charges.	Sentenced on 6/13/2024 to 12 months of Probation; Restitution in the amount $500; Special Assessments totaling $20; 100 hours of community service.	Sylvester received a full pardon on January 20, 2025
May 19, 2021	William Jason Sywak	Federal: Entering ... in a Restricted Building or Grounds; Disorderly ... in a Restricted Building or Grounds; Disorderly Conduct in a Capitol Building; Parading ... in a Capitol Building	Sywak pleaded Guilty to one charge: Parading ... in a Capitol Building. The other charges are dismissed.	Sentenced 6/9/2022 to 12 months probation; 2 months home confinement; 60 hours community service; $500 restitution; $10 special assessment.	Sywak received a full pardon on January 20, 2025
May 19, 2021	William Michael Sywak	Federal: Entering ... in a Restricted Building or Grounds; Disorderly ... in a Restricted Building or Grounds; Disorderly Conduct in a Capitol Building; Parading ... in a Capitol Building	Sywak pleaded Guilty to one charge: Parading ... in a Capitol Building. The other charges are dismissed.	Sentenced 6/9/2022 to 24 months probation; 4 months of home confinement/location monitoring; $500 restitution; $10 assessment; 60 hours community service.	Sywak received a full pardon on January 20, 2025

== See also ==
- Criminal proceedings in the January 6 United States Capitol attack
