= Tariq =

- Pronunciation: [tˤaːriq]
- Gender: Male
- Language: Arabic

Origin
- Language: Arabic
- Meaning: Striker, doorknocker, visitor, bright star, morning star

Other names
- Variant forms: Tarık (Turkish), Tarek, Tarik, Tareq, Tariq, Tareek, Tyreek
- Pet name: Tarrook

Tariq (Arabic: طارق) is an Arabic word and given name.

== Etymology ==
The word is derived from the Arabic verb طرق, (ṭaraqa), meaning "to strike", and into the agentive conjugated doer form طارق, (ṭāriq), meaning "striker". It became popular as a name after Tariq ibn Ziyad, a Muslim military leader who conquered Iberia in the Battle of Guadalete in 711 AD. The word also has several other meanings: "morning star", "visitor", "knocker" etc. It is also the name of a Quranic chapter.

Variations of the spelling include Tarık (Turkish), Tarek, Tarik, Tareq, Tariq, Tareek, and Tyreek

== In literature and placenames ==
Ṭariq is used in classical Arabic to refer to a visitor at night (a visitor "strikes" the house door). Due to the heat of travel in the Arabian Peninsula, visitors would generally arrive at night.

The use of the word appears in several places including the Quran, where ṭāriq is used to refer to the brilliant star at night, because it comes out visiting at night, and this is the common understanding of the word nowadays due to the Qur'an.

It can also be found in many poems. For example, from the famous poets Imru' al-Qais and Jarir ibn Atiyah.

Gibraltar is the Spanish derivation of the Arabic name Jabal Aṭtāriq (جبل طارق), meaning "Mountain of Tariq".

== Usage ==
In the Balkans, Tarik is popular among Bosniaks in the former Yugoslav nations. This is one of the most popular names in Bosnia and Herzegovina.

== Given name ==
=== Tarek ===
- Tarek El Ali (born 1986), Lebanese footballer
- Tarek Al Eryan (born 1963), Palestinian-American film director
- Tarek Al-Wazir (born 1971), German politician
- Tarek Ali Abdullah Ahmed Baada (born 1976), Yemeni extrajudicial prisoner of the United States
- Tarek Ali Hassan (1937–2024), Egyptian writer
- Tarek Amer (born 1989), Egyptian footballer
- Tarek bin Laden (born 1947), Saudi Arabian businessperson
- Tarek Boudali (born 1979), Moroccan French actor and director
- Tarek Boukensa (born 1981), Algerian runner
- Tarek Dergoul (born 1977), British extrajudicial prisoner of the United States
- Tarek Ehlail (1981–2025), German filmmaker
- Tarek El-Said (born 1978), Egyptian footballer
- Tarek El-Telmissany (born 1950), Egyptian cinematographer
- Tarek Elrich (born 1987), Australian soccer player
- Tarek Elsetouhi (born 1977), Egyptian bodybuilder
- Tarek Fatah (1949–2023), Canadian political activist
- Tarek Hadj Adlane (born 1965), Algerian footballer
- Tarek Heggy (born 1950), Egyptian writer
- Tarek Jabban (born 1975), Syrian footballer
- Tarek Kamel (1962–2019), Egyptian politician
- Tarek Lazizi (born 1971), Algerian footballer
- Tarek Mostafa (born 1971), Egyptian footballer
- Tarek Saab (born 1962), Lebanese-Venezuelan politician
- Tarek Shahin (born 1982), Egyptian cartoonist
- Tarek Shawki (born 1957), Egyptian engineer
- Tarek Thabet (born 1971), Tunisian footballer
- Tarek Tohme, American filmmaker
- Tarek Yehia (born 1961), Egyptian footballer
- Tarek El Moussa (born 1981), American TV host

=== Tarick, Tarık, Tarik ===
- Tarick Salmaci (born 1972), American boxer who featured on the TV show The Contender
- Tarık Akan (1949–2016), Turkish film actor
- Tarık Akıltopu (1918–2004), Turkish architect
- Tarik Black (born 1991), American NBA player
- Tarik Carson (1946–2014), Uruguayan-Argentine writer and painter
- Tarık Çelik (born 1996), American Twitch streamer
- Tarik Cerić (born 1978), Bosnian footballer
- Tarik Cohen (born 1995), American football player
- Tarık Daşgün (born 1973), Turkish footballer
- Tarik El-Abour (born 1992), Palestinian-American baseball player
- Tarik Elyounoussi (born 1988), Norwegian footballer
- Tarik Ergin (born 1961), American actor who played the part of Lieutenant Ayala in Star Trek: Voyager
- Tarik Filipović (born 1972), Croatian TV presenter and actor of Bosniak descent
- Tarik Khan (born 1980), American politician
- Tarik Glenn (born 1976), American football player
- Tarik "Rvssian" Johnston (born 1988), Jamaican music producer
- Tarik Muharemović (born 2003), Slovenian footballer
- Tarik O'Regan (born 1978), British composer living in New York City, USA
- Tarik Phillip (born 1993), British-American basketball player in the Israel Basketball Premier League
- Tarik Samarah (born 1965), Bosnian photographer who works in artistic and documentary photography
- Tarik Skubal (born 1996), American baseball player
- Tarik Sektioui (born 1977), Moroccan footballer
- Tarik Sulayman, Muslim Filipino military leader

=== Tareq, Tariq ===
- "Corn Kid", real name Tariq, American child influencer whose 2022 interview with Recess Therapy was remixed into a song by the Gregory Brothers titled "It's Corn"
- Lord Tariq, American rap artist who had collaborations with Peter Gunz
- Tareq Abboushi, Palestinian-American musician and composer
- Tariq Abdul-Wahad (born 1974), French NBA basketball player formerly known as Olivier Saint-Jean
- Tariq Ali (born 1943), British-Pakistani writer and film-maker
- Tariq Anwar (film editor) (born 1945), Indian-born British-American film editor
- Tariq Anwar (politician) (born 1951), Indian politician
- Tariq Aziz (1936–2015), Deputy Prime Minister of Iraq under Saddam Hussein
- Tariq Boney (born 2007), American football player
- Tariq Carpenter (born 1998), American football player
- Tariq Castro-Fields (born 1999), American football player
- Tariq Devega, better known as ASAP Nast (born 1990), American rapper, songwriter and model
- Tariq Hanna, Nigerian-born American pastry chef featured on Food Network
- Tariq Hussain (musician) (born 1968), Canadian musician
- Tariq Jakobsen (born 1974), Danish graphic design artist and illustrator
- Tariq Jameel (born 1953), Pakistani Islamic scholar with Tablighi Jamaat
- Tariq Lamptey (born 2000), English footballer
- Tariq Masood (born 1975), Pakistani Islamic scholar
- Tariq Monteiro (born 2000), better known as Suspect or Sus, British rapper
- Tariq Nasheed, American internet personality
- Tariq Ramadan (born 1962), Swiss academic and Islamic theologian
- Tariq al-Sawah (1957–2026), Egyptian Guantanamo Bay detainee
- Tariq Sims (born 1990), Australian NRL player
- Tariq Spezie (born 1980), Spanish football player
- Tareq Al-Suwaidan (born 1953), Kuwaiti intellectual, entrepreneur, Islamic scholar and reformer
- Tariq Trotter (born 1973), lead artist from the rap group The Roots
- Tariq Woolen (born 1999), American football player
- Tariq ibn-Ziyad (670–720), one of the Berber conquerors of the Iberian Peninsula in 711

=== Tarique, Tareque ===
- Tarique Ashraf (1940–1992), Pakistani writer and publisher
- Tarique Jackson (born 2009), Anguillan footballer
- Tareque Masud (1956–2011), Bangladeshi independent film director, film producer, screenwriter and lyricist
- Tareque Muhammad, Bangladeshi diplomat
- Tarique Rahman (born 1965), Bangladeshi politician and prime minister of Bangladesh
- Tareque Sayeed, Bangladeshi former lieutenant colonel sentenced to death for the 2014 murder of seven people
- Tarique Siddique (born 1994), Indian cricketer
- Tarique Ahmed Siddique, retired major general of the Bangladesh Army

=== Other variant spellings ===
- Tarééc (born 1978), German singer of Lebanese-Palestinian origin (real name Tarek Hussein)
- Tarec Saffiedine (born 1986), Belgian martial artist

== Fictional characters ==
- Tarik, Saladin's childhood friend from Saladin: The Animated Series
- Tarik the Ax Battler, one of the main characters of the Golden Axe video game franchise
- Tariq Temple, a recurring character on the sitcom Abbott Elementary

== See also ==
- Tariq Aziz (disambiguation)
- Tariq Khan (disambiguation)
- Azam Tariq (disambiguation)
