= The Sixth (2024 film) =

2024 American documentary film

- Official poster
- Directed by: Andrea Nix Fine; Sean Fine
- Written by: Andrea Nix Fine
- Produced by: Andrea Nix Fine; Sean Fine
- Cinematography: Sean Fine
- Edited by: Jeff Consiglio; Chrystie Martinez-Gouz
- Music by: H. Scott Salinas
- Production companies: A24; Change Content
- Distributed by: A24
- Release date: May 3, 2024
- Running time: 106 minutes
- Country: United States
- Language: English

The Sixth is a 2024 American documentary film, directed and produced by Andrea Nix Fine and Sean Fine. It follows the January 6 United States Capitol attack through the perspective of individuals who lived it.

It was released on May 3, 2024, by A24.

== Premise ==
It follows the January 6 United States Capitol attack through the perspective of individuals who lived it. Robert Contee, Mel D. Cole, Daniel Hodges, Erica Loewe, Jamie Raskin, and Christina Laury appear in the film.

== Production ==
In January 2021, it was announced Andrea Nix Fine and Sean Fine would direct a documentary revolving around the transition of power between presidents Donald Trump and Joe Biden for A24. Initially, The Fines sent a crew to capture Trump's speech, unaware of what was about to happen, before losing contact with their cinematographer Caz Rubacky and seeing the events of January 6 United States Capitol attack happen. Following the attack, The Fines decided to change course and make the film about the attack, with A24 agreeing.

The Fines did not purchase any footage shot by insurrectionists, instead using other sources.

== Release ==
The film was released on video on demand on May 3, 2024. Initially the film was set to be released on Amazon Prime Video alongside video-on-demand, but this plan was rolled back. The distribution of the film was criticized by multiple outlets, including participants, Jamie Raskin and Mel D. Cole, with Cole strictly participating in the film due to the involvement of A24. The film's release was compared to other A24 documentaries receiving releases with little fanfare including My Mercury and Open Wide.

== Reception ==
=== Critical reception ===
On the review aggregator website Rotten Tomatoes, 100% of six critics' reviews are positive, with an average rating of 8.8/10.

Noah Gittel of The Washington City Paper wrote: "This is the power of the documentary form. Never again must we forget our own nightmares. Especially when they come true." André Hereford from the Metro Weekly gave the film four out of five stars writing: "The Sixth delivers an urgent eyewitness chronicle of the Capitol under siege from people who feared for their lives that day."

== See also ==
Other documentary films about the Capitol attack:

- Day of Rage: How Trump Supporters Took the U.S. Capitol (2021)
- Four Hours at the Capitol (2021)
- This Place Rules (2022)
- A Storm Foretold (2023)
- The Insurrectionist Next Door (2023)
