= This Place Rules =

2022 American documentary film

- Genre: Documentary
- Directed by: Andrew Callaghan
- Starring: Andrew Callaghan

Production
- Executive producers: Tim Heidecker; Eric Wareheim; Andrew Callaghan; Evan Gilbert-Katz; Nic Mosher
- Producers: Dave Kneebone; Janel Kranking; Jonah Hill; Matt Dines; Alison Goodwin; Max Benator
- Cinematography: Nic Mosher; Ronald Weaver II
- Editor: Clay Lorant-Saldaña
- Running time: 82 minutes
- Production companies: A24; Strong Baby Productions; Abso Lutely Productions; Channel 5

Original release
- Network: HBO
- Release: December 30, 2022

This Place Rules is a 2022 American documentary film directed by Andrew Callaghan in his feature directorial debut. The film premiered on HBO on December 30, 2022, and was released on HBO Max the following day.

== Synopsis ==
The film follows Callaghan as he travels across the United States in the months preceding the January 6 attack on the U.S. Capitol.

== Production ==
Andrew Callaghan is the presenter and co-founder of Channel 5, a digital media company and web channel known for its gonzo journalism and man on the street interviews. He first discussed the then-untitled film on a July 2021 episode of the Fear & Malding podcast hosted by Hasan Piker and Will Neff. In a later livestream with Piker after the films release, Callaghan revealed that the original title for the film was "America Shits Itself." Callaghan also discusses the troubles of selling his film on an episode of the Leftovers podcast in November 2022. He says that he worked on the movie for four months and then pitched it for two years. In September 2022, HBO acquired the distribution rights for a documentary film directed by Callaghan centering around the January 6 United States Capitol attack. A24, Strong Baby Productions, and Abso Lutely Productions were also announced as production companies. Segments from the film were shown to those who attended the Channel 5 Live tour in late 2022, during which Callaghan also revealed that it would be titled This Place Rules and released on HBO Max on December 30, 2022. The film's first trailer was released on December 8, 2022, confirming the title and premiere date. InfoWars host and conspiracy theorist Alex Jones appears in the film.

== Release ==
This Place Rules premiered on HBO on December 30, 2022, and began streaming on HBO Max the next day.

== Public reception ==
As a result of the documentary, the film's producer, Andrew Callaghan, spoke publicly to media outlets about the film. In an interview with CNN, Callaghan describes how the film is also about the role of mainstream media, "stoking fear and division" among the public as they compete for viewership in the 24-hour news cycle. CNN co-host Don Lemon responded by disagreeing with Callaghan that the network had any influence on the events of January 6th. Callaghan also spoke to NPR's Alina Selyukh about the film, in addition to Variety, Interview, and Time.

Reviews have stated the film is uncomfortable, given the format of the documentary—in line with Callaghan's other work—takes direction from the interviewees and events occurring within the film. Some felt the lack of narrative meant a clear takeaway from the film was not possible, while others felt this echoed the intention of the film's director. The San Francisco Chronicle gave the film a 75 out of 100, praising it as a "fresh angle" on the events of January 6th, and commending Callaghan for his unique approach.

== See also ==
Other documentary films about the Capitol attack:

- Day of Rage: How Trump Supporters Took the U.S. Capitol (2021)
- Four Hours at the Capitol (2021)
- A Storm Foretold (2023)
- The Insurrectionist Next Door (2023)
- The Sixth (2024)
