= All Gas No Brakes =

YouTube channel

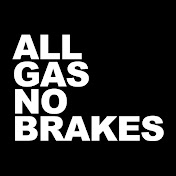
- Created by: Andrew Callaghan; Nic Mosher; Evan Gilbert-Katz
- Based on: All Gas No Brakes: A Hitchhiker's Diary | True Stories From the Road... Written and Curated by Andrew Callaghan by Andrew Callaghan
- Presented by: Andrew Callaghan
- Original language: English
- No. of seasons: 1
- No. of episodes: 24

Production
- Production location: United States
- Production company: Channel 5

Original release
- Network: YouTube; Patreon
- Release: September 9, 2019 – November 12, 2020

Related
- Channel 5

All Gas No Brakes

YouTube information
- Channel: All Gas No Brakes
- Years active: 2019–2020, 2025–Present
- Genre: Gonzo journalism
- Subscribers: 1.68 million
- Views: 93.5 million
- Last updated: July 1, 2026

All Gas No Brakes is an American YouTube channel originally created and hosted by presenter Andrew Callaghan. Its name is derived from the title of a memoir Callaghan previously wrote by the same name. (Note: The full title of the book is All Gas No Brakes: A Hitchhiker's Diary | True Stories From the Road... Written and Curated by Andrew Callaghan.) The channel has 1.68 million subscribers and over 93.5 million views as of July 2026. The channel features Callaghan traveling around the United States conducting vox pop interviews at various events, such as conventions and music festivals. The interviews are noted for their surreal and humorous viewpoints on serious topics. Nic Mosher and Evan Gilbert-Katz worked on the channel providing camera, audio, editing, and production management.

The show initially released videos from September 9, 2019, to November 12, 2020 before Callaghan announced on March 9, 2021 that he had departed from the show along with his crew consisting of Mosher and Gilbert-Katz. Following their departure from All Gas No Brakes, the team created a new YouTube channel titled Channel 5, which began on April 11, 2021.

== History ==
According to Callaghan, All Gas No Brakes was conceived of during the summer after he graduated high school when he hitchhiked across the United States before beginning his journalism studies at Loyola University New Orleans. Based on the experience, Callaghan wrote and self published a book based on his experience hitchhiking and the people he met along the way, titled All Gas No Brakes.

While at Loyola, Callaghan began doing man-on-the-street interviews along Bourbon Street. The videos, which were uploaded to YouTube and Instagram under the name "Quarter Confessions" led to a partnership between Callaghan and Doing Things Media.

In early 2020, Callaghan started an All Gas No Brakes podcast in response to travel restrictions stemming from the COVID-19 pandemic. On the podcast, Callaghan interviewed past subjects from All Gas No Brakes over video chat.

In March 2021, Callaghan announced via social media that he, along with his team, had left All Gas No Brakes and were no longer involved in the production of the web and television series that had been under production. He cited contract issues as the reason for their departure.

In March 2021, Callaghan and videographer Nate Kahn were quoted in a New York Times article describing the conditions of their dismissal. The pair described their dismissal as having stemmed from failed contract renegotiations with Doing Things Media and the media company's growing discomfort with the political content of the show—particularly an episode focusing on the George Floyd protests in Minneapolis. Callaghan and his crew were locked out of All Gas No Brakes' social media accounts in December 2020, and Callaghan was fired in March 2021.

On April 10, 2025, Andrew Callaghan posted to his personal social media account stating "Ten thousand comments and I'll use the Dear Kelly film proceeds to buy back All Gas No Brakes within 24 hours." On April 28th, Callaghan posted a selfie to the All Gas No Brakes Instagram page captioned "where to?", suggesting he has reacquired the channel. On May 22nd, 2025, Channel 5 officially announced the successful buyback of the All Gas No Brakes brand.

=== Television series ===
In May 2020, Doing Things Media and Abso Lutely Productions entered a deal to develop a television series based on the channel. According to Callaghan, the partnership began when Abso Lutely co-founder Eric Wareheim privately messaged him on Twitter to suggest the two create a television series. Wareheim, Tim Heidecker, and Dave Kneebone would serve as executive producers for Abso Lutely, while Callaghan, Reid Hailey, and Max Benator will serve as executive producers for Doing Things Media. In March 2021, Tim Heidecker confirmed on Twitter that Doing Things Media was no longer involved in the production of the series and that Callaghan was working with them on "something major".

== Style and influences ==
The channel originally featured Callaghan as he interviewed people at various events across the United States, such as the George Floyd protests in Minneapolis–Saint Paul. Interview subjects have included members of fringe subcultures such as furries, flat earthers, and others that Callaghan has said represent "true Americana."

In videos, Callaghan usually appeared dressed in an oversized beige suit and tie, citing this inspiration from television news anchors and how they dressed. Callaghan appeared without the suit in more “serious” themed episodes as a way to signal to viewers that the video would not be intentionally humorous, but rather bring attention to the topic at hand.

As a man-on-the-street interviewer, Callaghan's interviews were largely unplanned and improvised. As a result, he has been compared to Louis Theroux, Eric Andre, and Sacha Baron Cohen. Callaghan has also cited Kyle Mooney, Michael Moore, and The Daily Show correspondents as influences.

== Episodes ==
All Gas No Brakes episodes list.
No.	Title	Location	Original release date
1	"Burning Man"	Burning Man	September 9, 2019
2	"The Raid of Area 51"	Area 51	September 26, 2019
3	"AlienCon"	AlienCon 2019	October 15, 2019
4	"Talladega Superspeedway"	2019 1000Bulbs.com 500	October 25, 2019
5	"Florida Man"	Florida	November 18, 2019
6	"Donald Trump Jr. Book Club"	Birmingham, Alabama	December 18, 2019
7	"Flat Earth Conference"	Dallas, Texas	January 3, 2020
8	"Midwest FurFest"	Midwest FurFest	January 13, 2020
9	"A Night in Las Vegas"	Las Vegas, Nevada	January 29, 2020
10	"AVN Expo"	AVN Adult Entertainment Expo	February 18, 2020
11	"Gem & Jam"	Tucson, Arizona	March 7, 2020
12	"Conscious Life Expo"	Los Angeles, California	March 17, 2020
13	"Border Security Expo"	San Antonio, Texas	March 31, 2020
14	"Yung Terps"	Tucson, Arizona	April 5, 2020
15	"Coronavirus Lockdown Protest"	Sacramento, California	April 26, 2020
16	"Minneapolis Protest"	Minneapolis, Minnesota	June 8, 2020
17	"Rocket Launch"	Cape Canaveral, Florida	June 18, 2020
18	"Florida Man 2"	Florida	July 2, 2020
19	"Fourth of July"	Marquette, Michigan	July 18, 2020
20	"Portland Protest"	Portland, Oregon	August 5, 2020
21	"Sturgis Motorcycle Rally"	Sturgis Motorcycle Rally	September 4, 2020
22	"Brake Check Podcast #1: Neckface"	N/A	September 12, 2020
23	"Proud Boys Rally"	Portland, Oregon	October 3, 2020
24	"Bigfoot Hunting"	Remer, Minnesota	November 12, 2020
25	"Jesus Chroist Part 1"	—	November 13, 2020
26	"Jesus Chroist Part 2"	—	November 16, 2020
27	"Brake Check Podcast #2: Drakeo The Ruler"	N/A	December 1, 2020
28	"Trump Rally at Freedom Plaza"	Washington, D.C.	December 17, 2020
29	"Brake Check Podcast #3: Ethan and Hila"	N/A	December 18, 2020
30	"Brake Check Podcast #4 - Hasan Piker"	N/A	December 21, 2020
31	"Save Our Children Rally"	—	January 6, 2021
32	"Brake Check Podcast #5 - Polo Cutty & Urbyn"	N/A	January 8, 2021
33	"Terps (Part 1)"	—	January 13, 2021
34	"Dodgers World Series - Part 1"	—	February 9, 2021
