= Julian Shapiro-Barnum =

American actor (born 1999)

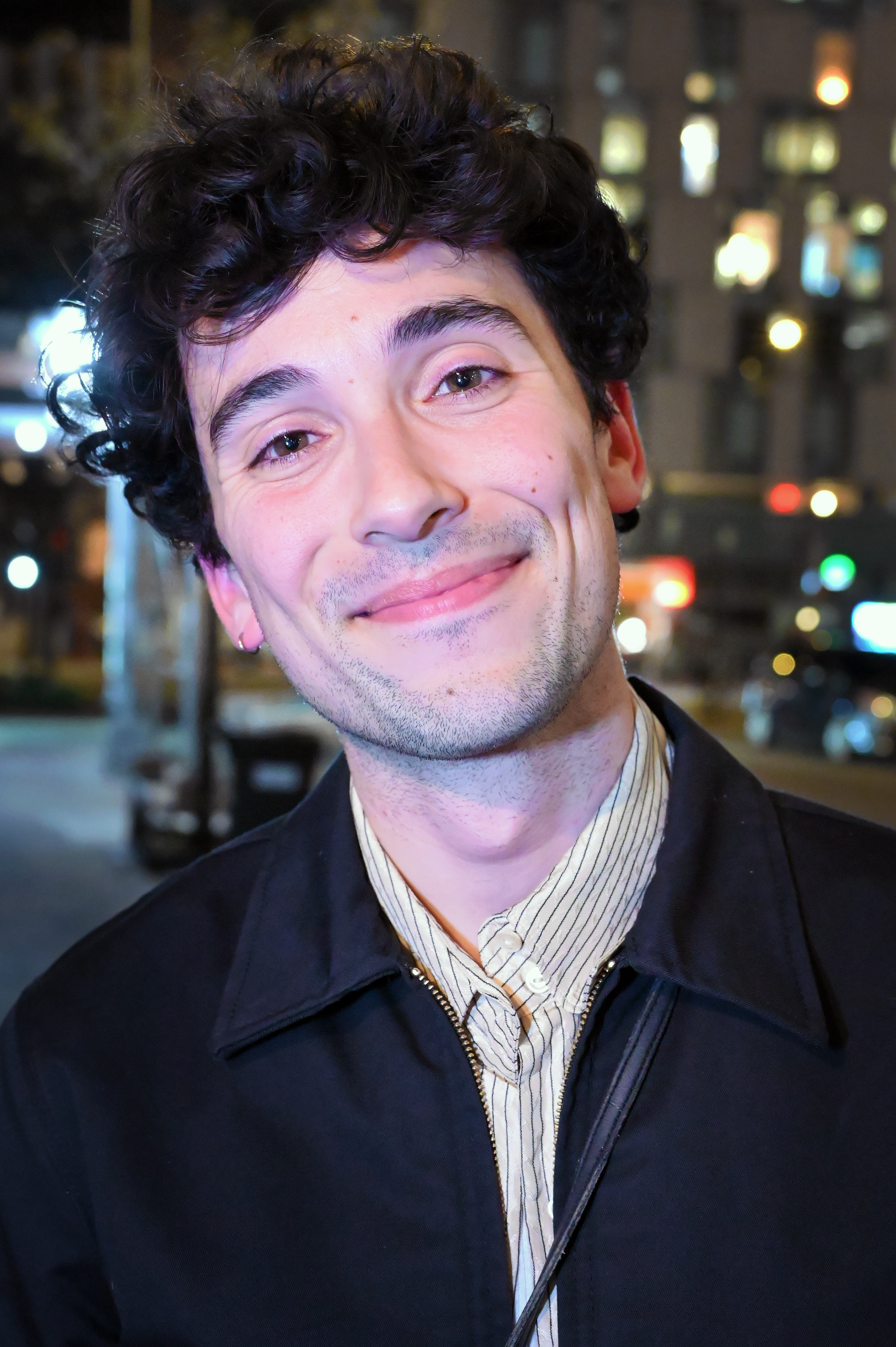
- Shapiro-Barnum in 2026
- Born: July 7, 1999 (age 27)
- Education: Boston University (BFA)
- Occupations: Actor; comedian
- Years active: 2020–present
- Notable credit: Recess Therapy (2021–present)
- Parent(s): 5, including Sophia Z. Lee and Lorin Sklamberg

Julian Shapiro-Barnum (born 7 July 1999) is an American actor and comedian, known for creating and hosting the web series Recess Therapy, in which he interviews children playing outside in New York City. In 2023, he was included in the Forbes 30 Under 30 list in the social media category.

== Biography ==
Shapiro-Barnum grew up in Cobble Hill, Brooklyn, and Philadelphia with five parents: his biological mother and her ex-wife, his biological father and his husband, and a stepmother. Two of his parents are Sophia Z. Lee, a law professor at the University of Pennsylvania Law School, and Lorin Sklamberg, lead singer of the Klezmatics. He is Jewish and bisexual. He attended the Boston University College of Fine Arts where he majored in acting, graduating in 2021 with a Bachelor of Fine Arts. The idea for Recess Therapy originated as part of Shapiro-Barnum's thesis project, and the series was eventually launched in April 2021 on YouTube in partnership with Doing Things Media. Many clips from the series have gone viral, including an interview with Corn Kid, and the series has featured guests such as Michelle Obama, Amy Poehler, and Charli XCX.

In 2022, Shapiro-Barnum was presented with the Family Entertainment Safe Streaming Hero Award at the inaugural Family Entertainment Awards Dinner by Variety and Kidoodle.TV. The following year, he won two Webby Awards, in the categories of Viral Video and Best Creator, Personality, or Host. Shapiro-Barnum is also the creator and executive producer of Celebrity Substitute, alongside Benj Pasek and Justin Paul. The web series, which features celebrities as substitute teachers in an elementary school classroom, launched in October 2024 on YouTube. His third web series, Outside Tonight, is a YouTube late-night talk show that premiered on June 17, 2026.
