= National Ascension Monument =

Turkish monument

- Ulusal Yükseliş Anıtı (Turkish)
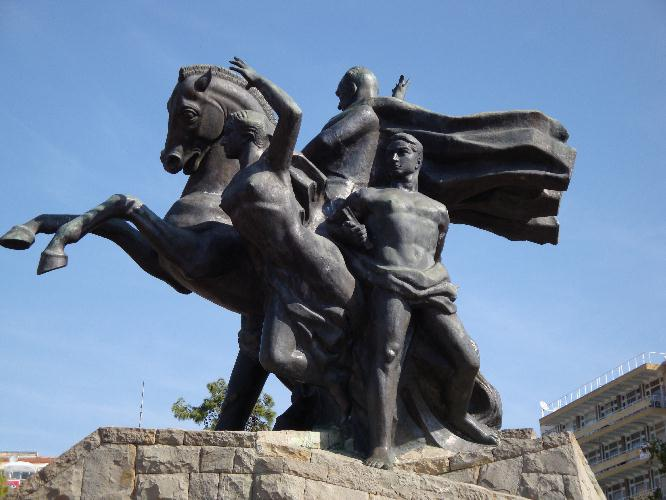
- Artist: Hüseyin Gezer
- Year: 1964
- Medium: Bronze
- Subject: Atatürk
- Dimensions: 600 cm (240 in)
- Location: Antalya; 36°53′12″N 30°42′11″E

The National Ascension Monument (Turkish: Ulusal Yükseliş Anıtı) is an Atatürk monument by Hüseyin Gezer created in 1964 and located in Antalya, Turkey. It has been described as one of Turkey's most meaningful monuments.

The monument represents, with a sudden rising base and figures right on the edge, the unity, and leadership of Atatürk leading Turkey through a series of victories leading up to the foundation of the Turkish Republic.

== Description ==
It is made of 12 tonnes of bronze and is six meters high. The base is a concrete shell with concrete columns under the bronze figures, inside the base, supporting the 12 tonnes of bronze.

The base of the statue contains dates starting from May 19, 1919, including the many victories during the founding of the new Turkish state, including the revolutions giving the new state its modernity. These steps are represented by the different levels in the base. Ataturk at the top flanked by a boy and a girl representing the youth of the nation and the trust that they have received.

== History ==
The president of the Ataturk Monument Creations Organisation, Muharrem Önal Bey and the architect Tarık Akıltopu organised a contest for the monument. 28 projects entered into the contest and Prof. Dr. Hüseyin Gezers project was chosen. While the monument was being built, a proper location was being searched for in Antalya. Eventually the Republic Square (Turkish: Cumhuriyet Meydanı) was chosen. After the location was chosen the architect Tarık Akıltopu started to work on the foundation/base of the monument. The granite stones for the base were brought from Yenice. The monument, which was funded completely from donations, was unveiled in May 1964.

In 2014 the monument was extensively cleaned.
