= Channel 5 (web series) =

American media company & web channel

- Also known as: Channel 5 with Andrew Callaghan
- Genre: Comedy, documentary film, vox populi, news, journalism
- Created by: Andrew Callaghan; Nic Mosher; Evan Gilbert-Katz
- Presented by: Andrew Callaghan
- Original language: English
- No. of seasons: 1
- No. of episodes: 41

Production
- Production location: United States

Original release
- Network: Patreon; YouTube
- Release: April 11, 2021 – present

Related
- All Gas No Brakes (parent series and predecessor)

Channel 5 with Andrew Callaghan

YouTube information
- Channel: Channel 5 with Andrew Callaghan
- Years active: 2021–present
- Genres: Gonzo journalism; documentary
- Subscribers: 3.48 million
- Views: 512.835 million
- Last updated: April 8th, 2026
- Website: channel5.news

Channel 5 (also known as "Channel 5 with Andrew Callaghan" on YouTube) is an American digital media company and web channel, billed as a "digital journalism experience." The show is a spinoff of the group's previous project, All Gas No Brakes, which was itself based on the book of the same name. The channel is hosted by Andrew Callaghan and has 3.6 million YouTube subscribers as of July 2026.

Similar to the format of All Gas No Brakes, the show features man on the street interviews, interviews with individuals or experts, as well as longer-form documentary film. The shows featuring sit-down, one-on-one interviews with host, Callaghan, are published under with the title "5CAST". The show is first broadcast via Patreon with content later added to their YouTube channel.

An affiliate channel, Channel 5 Clips, and Channel 5's Instagram page showcase humorous cuts from the longer content. The content of the show is released irregularly, from every few days to less than once a week. The show also hosts an online merchandise store, selling apparel and stickers.

== History ==
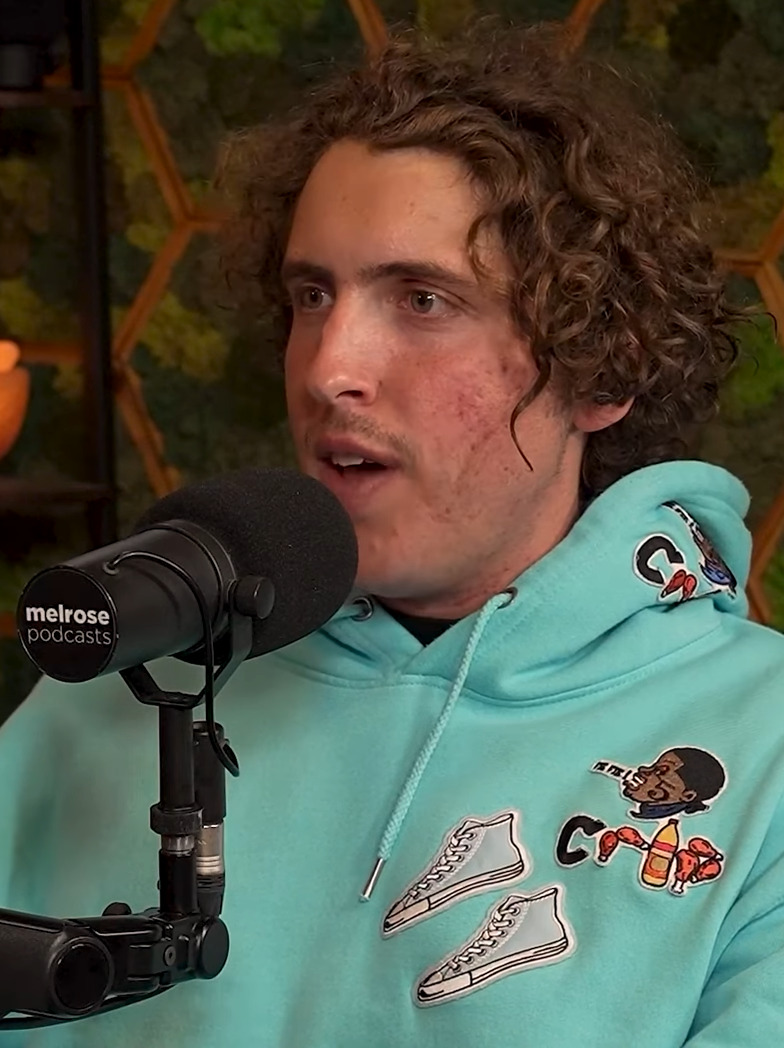
Channel 5's primary host Andrew Callaghan

Following a contract dispute with Doing Things Media over creative control and profit allocation for All Gas No Brakes, Callaghan, Mosher, and Gilbert-Katz ended the business relationship and created Channel 5 in April 2021, launching a Patreon page to support the channel. The team purchased a decommissioned news van and new production equipment and released limited edition merchandise in September 2021.

In December 2022, HBO announced a documentary special about the January 6 United States Capitol attack titled This Place Rules; the special was created by Callaghan and Channel 5 (with production by A24) and released on December 30. Previews from the documentary special were uploaded to the Channel 5 YouTube page.

In early January 2023, shortly after the release of This Place Rules, multiple women accused host Callaghan of sexual misconduct via social media platforms. On January 15, Callaghan responded to the allegations on YouTube and expressed that while some stories about him are "not true," he apologized for his behavior and said he planned to seek professional help.

In October 2023, Channel 5 returned with new content for the first time in nearly nine months. According to Complex, co-founders Mosher and Gilbert-Katz no longer follow Callaghan and it is unknown who is currently assisting with video production.

In 2024, a documentary film produced by Callaghan, entitled Dear Kelly was released. The film was directed by Andrew Callaghan, Jarrod Nicoson, and Elliot Liedgren. It is also the first film to be released independently by Channel 5, and was screened throughout the US in June and July 2024. The film follows a man Callaghan met in an interview at a 2021 White Lives Matter rally in Huntington Beach, California, as a radical, QAnon supporter who is estranged from his family following the 2008 financial crisis. The film took four years to produce.

In May 2025, Callaghan announced via Channel 5's social media platforms that All Gas No Brakes had been reacquired by the team.

In July 2025, Callaghan conducted a 3-hour long-form interview with Hunter Biden. During the discussion, Biden addressed a range of personal and political topics, including his past substance use, public controversies, and his views on the Democratic Party and its leadership. He commented on President Joe Biden's debate performance in 2024, suggesting it may have been influenced by Ambien. Hunter Biden also rejected speculation that he had used cocaine in the White House. The interview also included remarks about public figures such as George Clooney and broader reflections on immigration and political discourse.

After the interview, Melania Trump sent Hunter Biden and Channel 5 a letter demanding that Biden retract and apologize for his statement saying that Jeffrey Epstein introduced her to Donald Trump or she would proceed to sue. Biden declined to apologize and said he would be happy to litigate the matter, noting that during the interview he had clearly and explicitly attributed the claim about Melania Trump to journalist Michael Wolff's reporting.

In early 2026 Andrew Callaghan launched an affiliate channel, Canal Cinco. The channel features on the ground reporting and interviews with people in Latin America. The content is primarily produced in Spanish with English subtitles.

In July 2026, Callaghan conducted an interview between Hunter Biden and far-right activist Nick Fuentes after Fuentes approached Channel 5 asking for an interview. During the interview, an argument broke out between Fuentes and Biden that nearly led to a physical altercation. On July 20, 2026, Channel 5 launched indie streaming platform C5.NOW. Callaghan said it will platform independent filmmakers outside of Hollywood.

In September 2026, Channel 5 gave its list of email subscribers to Hunter Biden when "asked if he could use our mailing list whenever he launched a new project," to which Channel 5 agreed and shared the list with Biden, who later went to promote his own meme coin. Although Channel 5 released a follow-up statement that "emails from Hunter's team have not gone out to any of our public subscribers," the sharing of email addresses caused backlash amongst Channel 5's subscribers and supporters. Channel 5 would end their follow up statement with "we wish Hunter the best, shout out to the homie."

== Personnel ==
- Andrew Callaghan – Former host of Quarter Confessions and All Gas No Brakes.

Former personnel

- Nic Mosher – Videographer, skateboarder and skate videographer; childhood friend of Callaghan. No longer affiliated as of October 2023.
- Evan Gilbert-Katz – Videographer, childhood friend of Callaghan. No longer affiliated as of October 2023.

== Episodes ==
Channel 5 episodes list
| No. | Title | Description | Location | Original release date |
|---|---|---|---|---|
| 1 | "Miami Beach Spring Break" | Andrew interviews people enjoying spring break in Miami Beach during the COVID-19 pandemic in Florida, while dealing with curfews and lockdowns. The video was initially removed by YouTube for violating terms of service against COVID-19 misinformation, before being reinstated. | Miami Beach, Florida | April 11, 2021 |
| 2 | "Derek Chauvin Trial Verdict" | Andrew interviews attendees at the Trial of Derek Chauvin in Minneapolis. | Minneapolis, Minnesota | April 29, 2021 |
| 3 | "LA Punk Show" | Andrew interviews attendees at a punk rock show in Los Angeles. | Los Angeles, California | May 8, 2021 |
| 4 | "White Lives Matter Rally" | Andrew interviews protesters and counter-protesters at a White Lives Matter rally in Huntington Beach, California. | Huntington Beach, California | May 25, 2021 |
| 5 | "The Hoff Twins" | A short documentary film by Nic Mosher about two twins living in Marin City, California. | Marin City, California | May 27, 2021 |
| 6 | "Pick Up Artist Bootcamp" | Andrew interviews a group of men attending a pickup artist seminar in Las Vegas. | The Mirage, Las Vegas, Nevada | July 2, 2021 |
| 7 | "Q Conference" | Andrew interviews attendees of a QAnon conference in Dallas. | Omni Dallas Hotel, Dallas, Texas | July 28, 2021 |
| 8 | "Chet's World" | Andrew interviews Chet Hanks, actor and rapper. He is the son of actors Tom Hanks and Rita Wilson. Hanks coined the concept of White Boy Summer. | Los Angeles, California | September 1, 2021 |
| 9 | "Hollywood Antivax Rally" | Andrew covers the "Unity Rally", an anti-vaccine protest in Hollywood, California on October 9, 2021. | Hollywood, California | October 18, 2021 |
| 10 | "Uhuru March for Reparations" | Sidam, a guest host, interviews attendees at a Uhuru Solidarity march, in Oakland, California. | Oakland, California | October 24, 2021 |
| 11 | "Utah Rap Festival" | Andrew interviews attendees at the "Hive Festival", a rap music festival held in August 2021 in Salt Lake City. | Salt Lake City, Utah | November 1, 2021 |
| 12 | "Crip Mac" | Andrew interviews Crip Mac, a member of the street gang "The 55 Neighborhood Crips", in Westside Los Angeles. | Westside Los Angeles, California | November 18, 2021 |
| 13 | "Return to Talladega" | Andrew interviews attendees during a Xfinity Series race at Talladega Superspeedway. | Talladega Superspeedway, Talladega, Alabama | November 29, 2021 |
| 14 | "Phish Lot" | Andrew interviews Phish concertgoers at the parking lot of The Forum in Inglewood, California, as well as a traveling gang that sells them nitrous oxide. | Inglewood, California | December 29, 2021 |
| 15 | "Q Shaman Prison Interview" | Andrew interviews Jacob Chansley, also known as Jake Angeli or the Q Shaman, over the phone, while he is detained in the Alexandria Detention Center. | N/A | January 6, 2022 |
| 16 | "ComplexCon" | Sidam and Andrew interview attendees at "ComplexCon", a streetwear convention at the Long Beach Convention Center. | Long Beach, California | January 26, 2022 |
| 17 | "Chet Hanks Meets the Hoff Twins" | Andrew brings subjects of previous videos Chet Hanks and the Hoff Twins together for a joint interview. | N/A | February 16, 2022 |
| 18 | "Sidam's Super Bowl Sunday" | Sidam interviews attendees of Super Bowl LVI outside of the SoFi Stadium in Inglewood, then captures the reactions of fans in Downtown Los Angeles. | Inglewood, California; Downtown Los Angeles | February 22, 2022 |
| 19 | "The Peoples Convoy" | Andrew follows a fleet of truckers dubbed the "People’s Convoy" throughout the country and interviews multiple people along the way. | New Mexico; Washington, D.C. | March 10, 2022 |
| 20 | "War in Ukraine" | Andrew travels to Lviv, Ukraine to interview refugees and civilians impacted by the Russian invasion of Ukraine. | Lviv, Ukraine; Przemyśl, Poland | April 13, 2022 |
| 21 | "Satanic Temple Gathering" | Andrew interviews Satanists and Christian protesters gathered at the Satanic Temple Gathering in Scottsdale, Arizona. | Scottsdale, Arizona | May 5, 2022 |
| 22 | "NRA Conference" | Andrew interviews attendees as well as protesters at a conference held by the National Rifle Association of America between May 27 and 29, along with traveling to Uvalde, Texas to interview local residents affected by the Robb Elementary School shooting. | George R. Brown Convention Center, Houston, Texas; Uvalde, Texas | June 3, 2022 |
| 23 | "Daytona Bike Week" | Andrew and Sidam travel to the Daytona Beach Bike Week motorcycle rally to interview attendees. | Daytona Beach, Florida | June 17, 2022 |
| 24 | "Pro Choice Rally" | Andrew interviews pro-choice and pro-life protestors at a pro-choice rally in his hometown of Seattle around 48 hours after the Supreme Court's decision to overturn Roe v. Wade. | Seattle, Washington | June 30, 2022 |
| 25 | "Fourth of July" | Nic and Evan interview people on the street during Independence Day celebrations in Boston. (Note: This video was recorded in 2021 for Patreon but not released on YouTube until 2022. It was later taken down on YouTube due to a privacy request, but is still viewable on the Wayback Machine) | Boston, Massachusetts | July 5, 2022 |
| 26 | "SneakerCon + WeddingCon" | Andrew interviews attendees at SneakerCon, and stumbles across WeddingCon nearby, interviewing attendees there as well. | Anaheim Convention Center, Anaheim, California | July 14, 2022 |
| 27 | "Chicago Rap Festival" | Andrew interviews performers and festivalgoers at the "Summer Smash" rap festival in Chicago, and connects superfans to their favorite rappers. | Chicago, Illinois | August 16, 2022 |
| 28 | "O Block" | Andrew interviews residents of Parkway Garden Homes, also known as "O Block", about gang violence and the origin of drill music. Attendance at a White Sox baseball game is also featured. | Chicago, Illinois | September 2, 2022 |
| 29 | "Alex Jones Interview" | Andrew interviews Alex Jones at the recording studio for his website, InfoWars. Andrew also interviews a lawyer representing plaintiffs in the litigation surrounding Jones's conspiracy theories about the Sandy Hook shooting. | Austin, Texas; Newtown, Connecticut | September 29, 2022 |
| 30 | "Will Blunderfield" | Andrew interviews self-described "sexual kung fu" teacher Will Blunderfield. | Vancouver, British Columbia, Canada | October 12, 2022 |
| 31 | "World's Strongest Man" | Andrew interviews attendees and participants at the 2022 World's Strongest Man contest for strength athletics. | Sacramento, California | October 21, 2022 |
| 32 | "Hemingway Days" | Andrew, accompanied by Brace Belden, interviews attendees and participants at "Hemingway Days," an Ernest Hemingway look-alike contest, as well as people on the street in Key West. | Key West, Florida | December 15, 2022 |
| 33 | "Q Shaman Comes Home" | Andrew follows the release of Jacob Chansley from prison and a subsequent homecoming event in May 2023. | Phoenix, Arizona | October 8, 2023 |
| 34 | "Palestine Rally" | Andrew follows a pro-Palestine rally in Los Angeles in the wake of the Gaza war. | Consulate General of Israel, Los Angeles, California | October 15, 2023 |
| 35 | "Israel Rally" | As a follow-up to the previous episode, Andrew documents a pro-Israel rally in Los Angeles. | Museum of Tolerance, Los Angeles, California | October 22, 2023 |
| 36 | "Crip Mac Returns" | Andrew reunites with rapper and activist Crip Mac after he served a 27-month prison sentence for a probation violation in 2021. | Los Angeles, California | October 31, 2023 |
| 37 | "Calgary Stampede" | Andrew interviews attendees of the Calgary Stampede, a rodeo festival in Canada. This video was recorded in 2022 for Patreon but not released on YouTube until 2023. | Calgary, Alberta, Canada | November 5, 2023 |
| 38 | "Toronto Mans" | Andrew examines the urban and online culture of Toronto, the most populous city in Canada. This video was recorded in 2022 for Patreon but not released on YouTube until 2023. | Toronto, Ontario, Canada | November 12, 2023 |
| 39 | "San Francisco Streets" | Andrew interviews various San Francisco residents, focusing on inner-city crime and drugs around the Tenderloin neighborhood. | San Francisco, California | November 22, 2023 |
| 40 | "Jack the Bipper" | As a follow-up to the previous episode, Andrew follows the life of "Jack the Bipper," a San Francisco "bipper" who resells stolen goods. | San Francisco, California | December 1, 2023 |
| 41 | "Harm Reduction Facility" | Continuing the San Francisco series, Andrew examines the operations and mission of a harm reduction facility in the city. | San Francisco, California | December 8, 2023 |
| 42 | "Philly Streets" | Andrew interviews various Philadelphia residents, focusing on an open-air drug market in the neighborhood of Kensington, contrasted with gentrification in the city. | Philadelphia, Pennsylvania | January 9, 2024 |
| 43 | "Arizona Border Crisis" | Andrew interviews migrants at the Lukeville Port of Entry, which was closed in December 2023, along the Mexico–United States border. | Lukeville, Arizona | January 12, 2024 |
| 44 | "Crip Mac Returns to Prison" | Andrew interviews friends, family, and associates of Crip Mac, following Crip Mac's continued legal issues, alongside an examination of the U.S. justice system. | Los Angeles, California | January 15, 2024 |
| 45 | "Migrant Detention Camp" | Andrew interviews migrants seeking asylum in the US, who originated from various countries all over the world, including Guatemala, Senegal, and Bangladesh. | Lukeville, Arizona | January 21, 2024 |
| 46 | "Ocean City Streets" | Andrew interviews his relatives and citizens of Ocean City, New Jersey, focusing on the prohibition of public drinking, the history of the town, and alcohol consumption. | Ocean City, New Jersey | January 26, 2024 |
| 47 | "Texas Border Crisis" | Andrew follows up on the Mexico–United States border crisis, interviewing a local rapper and resident of Texas border town Eagle Pass, two local coyotes and starts a journey across the border alongside his cameraman Larry Susan. | Eagle Pass, Texas; Piedras Negras, Coahuila, Mexico | February 1, 2024 |
| 48 | "Hopping the Border" | Andrew and Larry continue the journey across the border, focusing on numerous deaths of immigrants in the Rio Grande river and the motivations of the coyotes. | Piedras Negras, Coahuila, Mexico | February 8, 2024 |
| 49 | "Border Patrol Arrest" | Andrew is detained at a Border Patrol detention facility in Eagle Pass, TX alongside other migrants. | Eagle Pass, Texas | February 14, 2024 |
| 50 | "Defend the Border Convoy" | TBA | Eagle Pass, Texas | February 29, 2024 |
| 51 | "Vegas Tunnels" | Andrew interviews residents of flood control tunnels under the Las Vegas Strip as well as caregivers and members of the community, exploring homelessness, addiction, and his role as a documentarian. | Las Vegas, Nevada | March 28, 2024 |
| 52 | "D.A.R.E. Conference" | TBA | Las Vegas, Nevada | April 12, 2024 |
| 53 | "Connecticut Kia Boyz" | TBA | New Haven, Connecticut | April 19, 2024 |
| 54 | "Folsom Street Fair" | Andrew and Sidam travel to the Folsom Street Fair to interview attendees. This video was recorded in 2021 for Patreon but not released on YouTube until 2024. | Folsom Street, San Francisco, California | May 9, 2024 |

== Music videos ==
In the "Utah Rap Festival" episode of the web show, Callaghan interviewed multiple young rappers. He flew out two teens to professionally record their song "Clap That", with an accompanying music video, which was released on the Channel 5 YouTube channel on January 4, 2022.

- "Clap That" - Rowboat (ft. Lil Xay)

== Awards and nominations ==
| Year | Nominated work | Award | Category | Result | Ref. |
|---|---|---|---|---|---|
| 2021 | Channel 5 with Andrew Callaghan | 11th Streamy Awards | News | Won | |
| 2022 | Channel 5 with Andrew Callaghan | 12th Streamy Awards | News | Nominated | |
