= Doing Things Media =

American internet media company

- Industry: Digital media
- Founded: 2017 in Atlanta, US
- Founders: Reid Hailey and Derek Lucas
- Website: doingthings.com

Doing Things Media (DTM) is an American digital media company that focuses on pop culture and humor. Its brands include Middle Class Fancy, Animals Doing Things, Shitheadsteve, Recess Therapy, Bob Does Sports, and Overheard.

It was co-founded in 2017 by Reid Hailey and Derek Lucas and was headquartered in Atlanta before opting for permanent remote work. DTM's clients include Netflix, Amazon, Anheuser-Busch, and T-Mobile. As of 2023, the company has 35+ social media meme accounts with over 75 million followers across Instagram, Facebook, TikTok, YouTube, and Snapchat.

== History ==
Doing Things Media was founded by Reid Hailey and Derek Lucas in 2017 after both had developed large followings for posting internet memes on Instagram. Reid Hailey created an Instagram meme account named @Shitheadsteve in 2014, while taking college classes. The account obtained one million followers in less than a year, and Hailey created other accounts such as @Trashcanpaul and @HouseofGaming. Hailey met his future co-founder Derek Lucas after Lucas created the meme account @DrunkPeopleDoingThings in 2015. Both Reid Hailey and Derek Lucas dropped out of college. Lucas starting a medical-marijuana delivery service before co-founding Doing Things Media.

Hailey and Lucas were part of a group message that called itself the Meme Illuminati. The chat included meme accounts and celebrities including Chris D'Elia, John Mayer, and B.J. Novak.

In February 2022, Doing Things secured a $21.5 million Series A funding round. In August, DTM partnered with Paramount+ to host the season three premiere of Star Trek: Lower Decks.

Doing Things Media was named Most Innovative Publisher at the 2022 Digiday Awards.

== Work ==
Paper Magazine writes that "the overall theme of what makes it onto any of their meme pages seems to be 'nostalgic wholesomeness' — humor that somehow doesn't offend anyone because the stereotypes they joke about are so deeply benign." DTM describes itself as a "24/7 dopamine drip machine.” Because it produces dozens of popular social media accounts, DTM is able to cross-promote new projects.

As of 2020, 30% of the company's revenue comes from e-commerce. In addition, Doing Things Media makes money from subscription content and TV production and sponsored ads that resemble memes.

Doing Things Media had a TV show on Nat Geo Wild called "Animals Doing Things" based on its @AnimalsDoingThings account. Howie Mandel is its narrator, executive producer, and director. The company wrote a book called Doggos Doing Things based on its @DoggosDoingThings account. “We are always thinking about how to turn our social presence into a product," co-founder Reid Hailey told The Hustle. "Can we make a game? Can we make a beverage?”

=== Middle Class Fancy ===
Doing Things Media acquired the brand MiddleClassFancy in 2018. In 2021, MiddleClassFancy teamed up with Guy Fieri to release a limited-edition burger at Fieri's ghost kitchen called Guy Fieri's Flavortown Kitchen.

=== All Gas No Brakes ===
In 2019, Andrew Callaghan became a full-time content creator for Doing Things Media after the company's co-founder Reid Hailey saw one of Callaghan's videos. Doing Things also hired Callaghan's longtime friends, Nic Mosher and Evan Gilbert-Katz. All Gas No Brakes got traction on YouTube in late 2019 and throughout 2020. In May 2020, the company signed a development deal with Abso Lutely Productions for a TV series based on All Gas No Brakes. The relationship eventually soured between Callaghan and Doing Things Media, with Callaghan citing contract issues and exploitative behaviour by Doing Things Media as the reason for his departure. As of May 2025, Callaghan and Doing Things Media reached an agreement to acquire All Gas No Brakes from Doing Things Media as an affiliate program of Callaghan's independent news network, Channel 5.

=== Recess Therapy ===
In 2020, Julian Shapiro-Barnum began a video series in which he interviews children, originally titled as Kids Doing Things. Doing Things Media hired Shapiro-Barnum, rebranded the account, and launched it as Recess Therapy. The host was inspired how “kids in the playground remained joyous despite the pandemic’s perturbations.” In an interview with The New York Times, Shapiro-Barnum said, “The reason it’s called Recess Therapy is that the original idea was that I was going to bring things that I was struggling with to children and, like, get advice from them.”

Since its launch, Recess Therapy has over 2.4 million followers. In 2022, the series produced the viral video Corn Kid, which was named #1 TikTok trend of 2022.

In December 2022, Shapiro-Barnum received the Family Entertainment Safe Streaming Hero Award at Variety's inaugural Family Entertainment Awards Dinner.

=== Overheard ===
In January 2023, Doing Things Media acquired Overheard, a social media brand dedicated to sharing eavesdropped conversations in locales like Los Angeles and New York.

=== Bob Does Sports ===
In 2021, Doing Things Media partnered with Robby Berger to create Bob Does Sports, an online series focusing on golf content. Co-hosted by Fat Perez and Joe Demare, the account has over 1 million Instagram followers.

=== Breezy Golf ===
In 2022, the Bob Does Sports team and Doing Things Media launched Breezy Golf, a golf apparel and accessories brand. Co-led by Bob Does Sports cast members Robby Berger (Bobby Fairways), Nick Stubbe (Fat Perez), and Joseph Demare (Joey Cold Cuts), the brand sells golf apparel and golf accessories.

== Controversy ==
Doing Things Media faced criticism for posting sponsored content about Mike Bloomberg's presidential campaign across twelve of the company's pages. According to Reuters, Doing Things Media founder Reid Hailey said it was "a creative decision, rather than an endorsement of Bloomberg." Other meme accounts, such as those affiliated with FuckJerry, also promoted Bloomberg.
