= The Insurrectionist Next Door =

2023 American documentary film

- Directed by: Alexandra Pelosi
- Produced by: Alexandra Pelosi
- Cinematography: Alexandra Pelosi
- Edited by: Geof Bartz
- Production company: HBO Documentary Films
- Distributed by: HBO
- Release date: October 15, 2023
- Running time: 75 minutes
- Country: United States
- Language: English

The Insurrectionist Next Door is a 2023 American documentary film directed and produced by Alexandra Pelosi. The documentary revolves around Pelosi conducting candid interviews with several individuals charged with crimes for participating in the January 6 United States Capitol attack, an unsuccessful attempt to prevent the 2021 United States Electoral College vote count certifying Joe Biden's victory over Donald Trump in the 2020 United States presidential election.

The film was released by HBO on October 15, 2023, and received generally favorable reviews from critics.

== Background ==
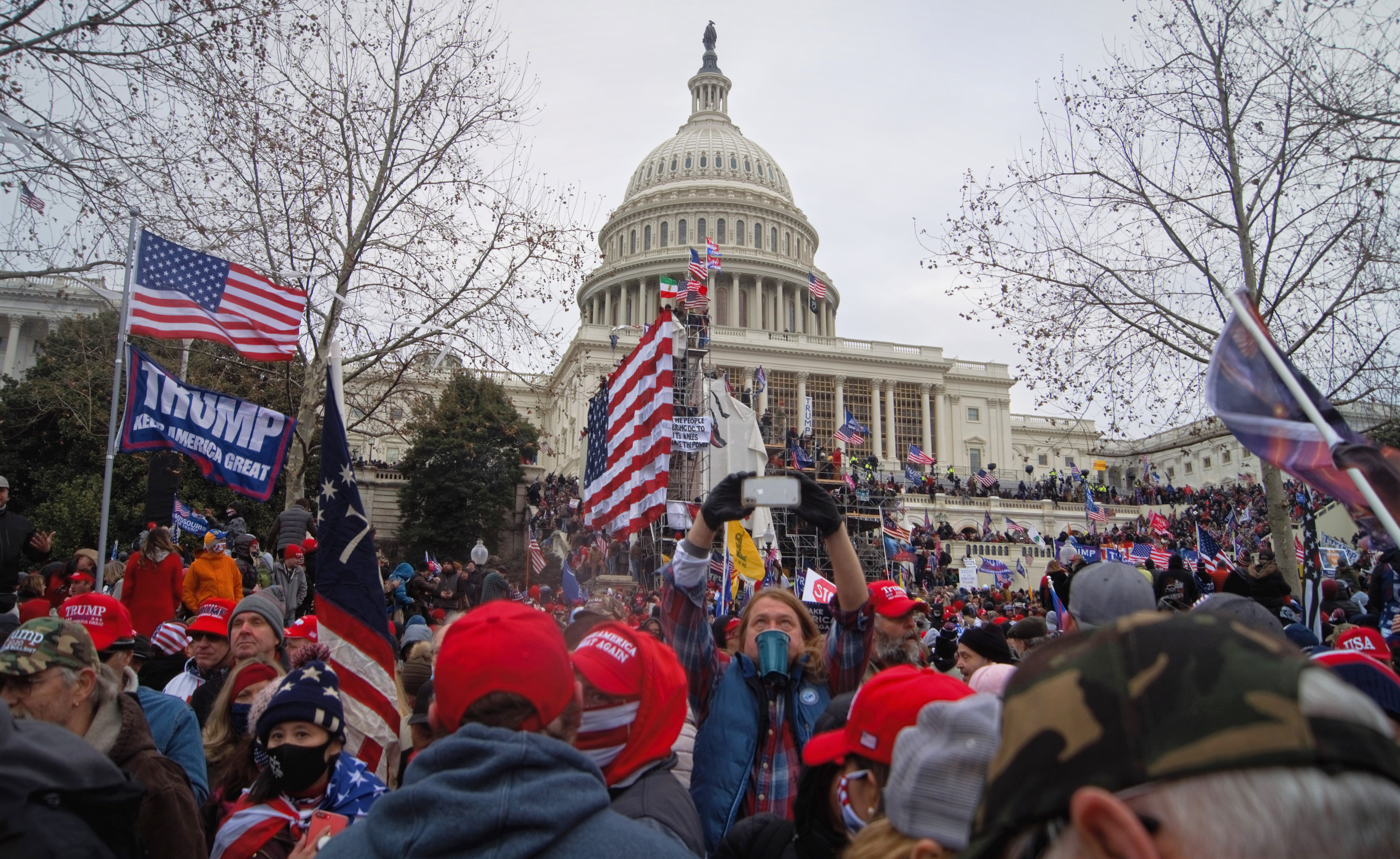
Supporters of then-U.S. President Donald Trump storming the United States Capitol on January 6, 2021

Following his loss to Democratic nominee Joe Biden in the 2020 United States presidential election, Republican incumbent Donald Trump and his allies attempted to overturn the election, making false claims of widespread electoral fraud. On January 6, 2021, these efforts culminated in the January 6 United States Capitol attack in Washington, D.C., in which a mob of Trump supporters stormed the United States Capitol in an unsuccessful attempt to prevent the 2021 United States Electoral College vote count certifying Biden's victory in the 2020 election. In addition to delaying the vote count by multiple hours, the attack led to assaults on at least 174 police officers, $2.7 million in damages, the killing of Ashli Babbitt, and the second impeachment of Donald Trump for incitement of insurrection. On January 20, 2025—the first day of his second presidency—Trump granted blanket clemency to everyone convicted or charged in connection with the Capitol attack, including those who violently attacked police.

Alexandra Pelosi, director and producer of The Insurrectionist Next Door, is the youngest daughter of Congresswoman Nancy Pelosi and businessman Paul Pelosi. During the Capitol attack, multiple rioters targeted Nancy Pelosi, who had been sworn into her fourth term as speaker of the United States House of Representatives three days beforehand. One rioter, Guy Reffitt, spoke of wanting to drag Pelosi and other lawmakers from the building, stating: "I just want to see Pelosi's head hitting every fucking stair." Another rioter, Dawn Bancroft, spoke of "looking for Nancy to shoot her in the frickin' brain" in a video she recorded while leaving the Capitol grounds. Moreover, Adam Christian Johnson stole Pelosi's lectern and left it in the United States Capitol rotunda, Richard "Bigo" Barnett stole an envelope and left a note containing a sexist slur in Pelosi's office, and Riley Williams stole both a gavel and a government-issued laptop belonging to Pelosi, allegedly intending to sell data on the latter to Russian intelligence; neither the gavel nor the laptop has been recovered.

Alexandra Pelosi and her two teenage sons were present at the Capitol during the attack, though they were removed by security before they were able to encounter any of the rioters. Reflecting on this, Pelosi questioned: "I was really curious: Who are these people that came to kill my mother? Who are these people that wanted to hang her from a lamppost? (Note: In a meeting with members of his far-right anti-government Oath Keepers militia on January 10, 2021, Stewart Rhodes stated: "My only regret is they should have brought rifles. We should have brought rifles. We could have fixed it right then and there. I'd hang fucking Pelosi from the lamppost. On May 25, 2023, Rhodes was sentenced to 18 years in prison and 36 months of supervised release, which at the time was the longest sentence for any Capitol attack defendant.) Who are these people that said, 'I'm going to put a bullet in her noggin?'" (Note: The day after the Capitol attack, Cleveland Grover Meredith Jr. sent his uncle text messages in which he spoke of shooting both Nancy Pelosi and D.C. Mayor Muriel Bowser in the head. On December 14, 2021, Meredith was sentenced to 28 months in prison followed by three years of supervised release, having pleaded guilty to a felony charge of interstate communication of threats.) Pelosi shot footage of her mother during the riot, which would later be used for her 2022 documentary Pelosi in the House.

== Premise ==
Throughout The Insurrectionist Next Door, Pelosi conducts candid interviews over two years with several individuals charged with crimes for participating in the Capitol attack, questioning why they traveled to Washington, D.C., what motivated their participation in the riot, whether they have any regrets, and whether their support for Trump has changed after being incarcerated. Most of the interviewees had been charged with and pleaded guilty to misdemeanors. According to Pelosi, the far-right anti-government Oath Keepers militia designated these individuals as "normies" and relied upon their participation in order for the attack to succeed.

Explanations interviewees offered for participating in the riot ranged from anger or boredom to mass hysteria or "lovesick depression". Most of the interviewees were unrepentant, continued to support Trump, and remained convinced that the 2020 election was stolen from him. Nevertheless, a few of the interviewees stated that they had previously voted for Barack Obama, with one claiming to have voted for Biden in 2020.

The film includes interviews with the following individuals:

- Johnny Harris: A man from Shelby, North Carolina, who was one of the last rioters to leave the Capitol. Harris wore a Trump bandana with matching red, white, and blue clothing while using his cell phone and GoPro camera to record his time inside and outside the Capitol. Harris also carried an American flag and a megaphone, using the latter inside the building to start a chant with other rioters. When a reporter with a French film crew in the Capitol rotunda asked him what he was attempting to do, Harris responded: "Kick ass and take names later!" On February 22, 2023, Harris pleaded guilty to a misdemeanor charge for breaking into the Capitol. On June 2, 2023, U.S. District Judge Randolph Moss sentenced Harris to seven months in prison followed by 12 months of supervised release, as well as ordering him to pay $500 in restitution, making Harris the 11th North Carolinian to be sentenced to prison for crimes committed during the riot. Throughout his interview with Pelosi, Harris smiles while insisting that the riot was actually caused by government operatives disguised as Trump supporters.
- Emily Hernandez: A woman from Missouri who was photographed holding Nancy Pelosi's nameplate inside the Capitol during the riot. In her interview, Hernandez states that she simply wanted to get "out of the house and out of Missouri", and that although she was not interested in hearing Trump's speech preceding the riot, she "just wanted to see the area". Upon being asked whether she went to the Capitol to assassinate Alexandra Pelosi's mother, Hernandez replies that she did not, and in fact had not even known what Nancy Pelosi looked like. On January 10, 2022, Hernandez pleaded guilty to a federal misdemeanor count of entering and remaining in a restricted building or grounds, for which she was sentenced to 30 days in federal prison and one year of supervised release. Just days before pleading guilty, Hernandez had been arrested and charged with one count of driving while intoxicated (DWI) causing death and one count of DWI causing serious physical injury. It was later determined that Hernandez had a blood alcohol content of 0.125 and was driving the wrong way on an interstate in Franklin County, Missouri, when she crashed into a car, killing 32-year-old Victoria Wilson and injuring Wilson's 36-year-old husband Ryan; the pair had been out celebrating their 15th wedding anniversary. On November 5, 2024, Hernandez pleaded guilty to her DWI charges. On January 29, 2025, nine days after being pardoned by Trump for her Capitol riot involvement, Hernandez was sentenced to 10 years in prison for her DWI convictions.
- Paul Hodgkins: A crane operator from Tampa, Florida, who was the first Capitol attack defendant to be sentenced for a felony, as well as the second overall to plead guilty. During the riot, Hodgkins waved a "Trump 2020" flag and took a selfie inside the United States Senate chamber. On June 2, 2021, Hodgkins pleaded guilty to obstructing an official proceeding. On July 19, 2021, Judge Randolph Moss sentenced Hodgkins to eight months in prison followed by 24 months of supervised release, along with a special assessment of $100. Pelosi meets with Hodgkins both before and after his prison term; he reveals that he continues to watch the far-right television channel One America News Network and tells Pelosi: "My opinions on what's good and what's not good for our country have not changed."

== Production and release ==
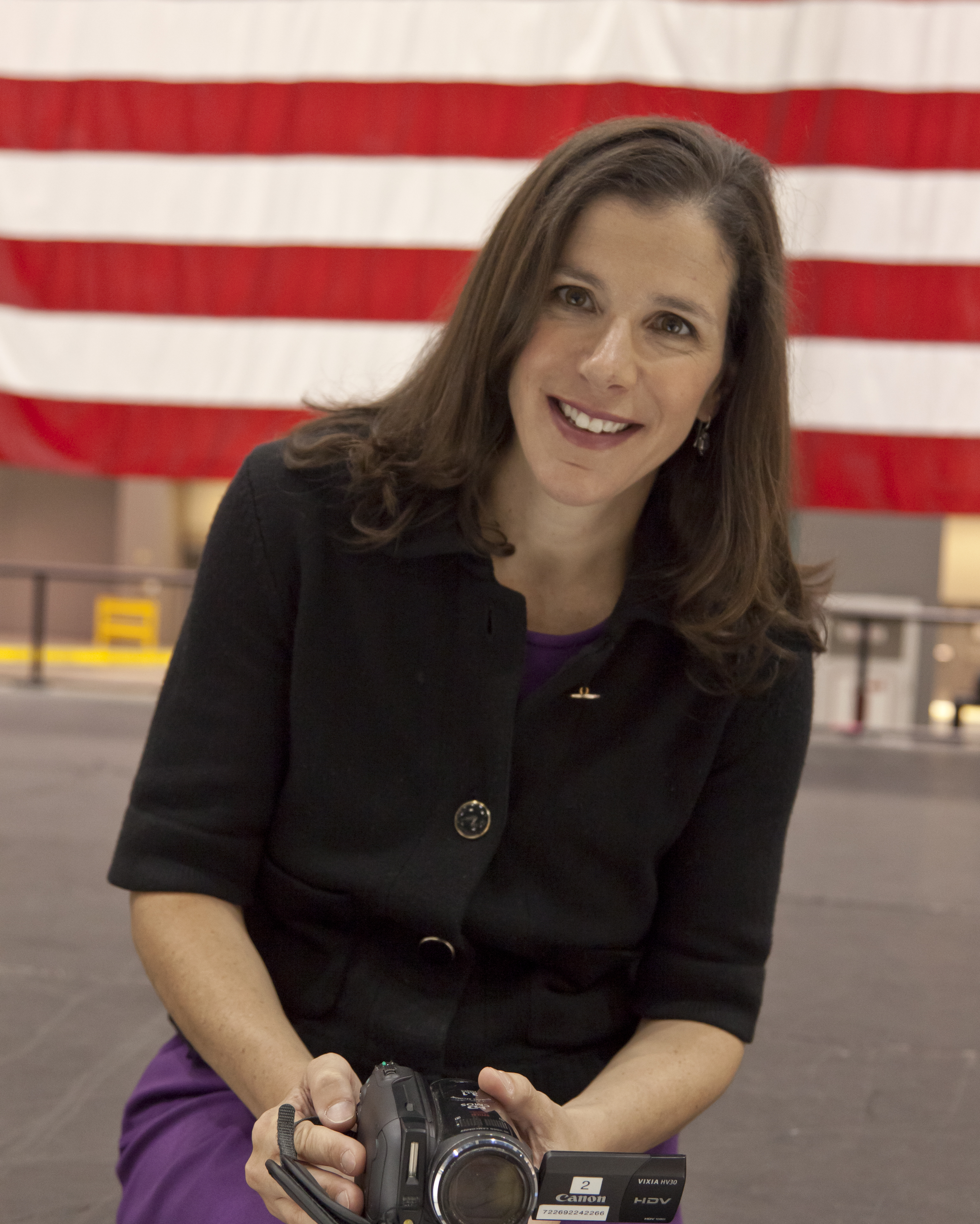
Alexandra Pelosi, the film's director and producer, pictured in 2013

Alexandra Pelosi wanted to make a film focusing on individuals involved in the January 6 United States Capitol attack, including Ronald Sandlin, to better understand their intentions, as they are going to be voters in the next American election.

HBO announced the film's release date on October 10, 2023, also revealing that it would be available to stream on HBO Max. The film premiered on October 15, 2023, as Pelosi's 15th documentary for HBO. In addition to being directed and produced by Pelosi, the film was edited by Geof Bartz, Nancy Abraham and Lisa Heller were executive producers, and Anna Klein served as coordinating producer.

== Reception ==
On the review aggregation website Metacritic, 83% of six critic reviews for The Insurrectionist Next Door are positive.

Brian Lowry of CNN wrote: "Overall, though, the documentary provokes the dispiriting sense that while people with conflicting views can talk, when the gap's this wide and the unwavering belief to disinformation this toxic, there's almost no way to make them hear."

The Insurrectionist Next Door was named a NYT Critic's Pick by The New York Times, whose Nicolas Rapold described the film as "compulsively watchable", stating that Pelosi's "brisk emotional portraits of Americans are disarming, unpredictable, funny, sad, and, yes, at times enraging". Concluding his review, Rapold wrote: "In the end, as a document, it's undeniable: The unvarnished human detail gives the film a life of its own that escapes any particular polemic or hope."

On January 6, 2025—the fourth anniversary of the Capitol attack—The Hollywood Reporter listed The Insurrectionist Next Door as one of "Five Jan. 6 Projects to Watch and Read", alongside the 2021 HBO documentary Four Hours at the Capitol, the 2024 A24 documentary The Sixth, and former White House aide Cassidy Hutchinson's 2023 memoir, Enough.

== See also ==
Other documentary films about the January 6 United States Capitol attack:

- Day of Rage: How Trump Supporters Took the U.S. Capitol (2021)
- This Place Rules (2022)
- A Storm Foretold (2023)
