= Ronald Sandlin =

American Capitol rioter

- Born: 1986 or 1987; Mexico
- Other name: Ronnie
- Citizenship: United States of America
- Occupation: Internet marketer
- Known for: Participation in the January 6 United States Capitol attack
- Convictions: Conspiracy to obstruct an official proceeding (18 U.S.C. § 1512); Assaulting, resisting or impeding certain officers (18 U.S.C. § 1512)
- Penalty: 63 months imprisonment $2,000 fine (later increased by $20,000)

Ronald Sandlin is an American internet marketer and convicted felon who took part in the January 6 United States Capitol attack.

In December 2022, Sandlin was jailed for 63 months after pleading guilty to his crimes and fined $2,000. A few days later, the judge increased the fine by $20,000. Sandlin was released from custody on December 3, 2024.

On January 20, 2025, after beginning his second term in office, President Trump issued pardons to roughly 1,500 individuals charged with crimes connected to January 6, including Sandlin.

== Early life ==
Sandlin was born in Mexico and later adopted by a father who was a chemical engineer and a mother who was a school teacher.

== Career and views ==
Sandlin worked as an internet marketer. At the time of the Capitol attack, he was a Donald Trump supporter who believed Trump's false claims of electoral fraud in the 2020 United States presidential election.

== Capitol attack ==
In the days prior to the January 6 United States Capitol attack, Sandlin used Facebook to share a photo of fellow insurrectionist Josiah Colt holding a firearm with the caption "My fellow patriot sleeping ready for the boogaloo on Jan. 6." Sandlin, Colt, and Nathaniel DeGrave then drove to Washington, D.C. in a rented car and, according to US federal prosecutors, brought "gas and face masks, helmets, shin guards, protective gear, one Glock pistol, a bodyguard pocket pistol, knives, a slingshot, a handheld taser/stun gun, an expandable baton, walkie talkies and two cans of bear mace".

On January 6, 2021, Sandlin trespassed into the United States Capitol building where he attempted to forcibly remove a police officer's helmet, removed an oil painting from the wall, stole a book, and smoked marijuana. Sandlin filmed himself telling police officers "You’re going to die, get out of the way!"

He was arrested in Las Vegas on January 29, 2021. During his February 1, 2021, pre-trial hearing, he pleaded with the judge to be allowed to stay with his parents while awaiting trial, but was remanded in custody. While in detention awaiting trial, Sandlin threatened a prison worker with a chair. While in jail awaiting trial, Sandlin announced that he was working out a deal with Netflix to sell footage filmed by him on January 6. He also claimed to have met with Dinesh D'Souza and to have discussed his activities with podcaster Joe Rogan.

Sandlin pleaded guilty to assaulting, resisting or impeding police officers and to conspiracy to obstruct an official proceeding on September 30, 2022. He was sentenced to 63 months in prison and fined $2,000. In court, he expressed remorse and regret. After court discussions about an online fundraising campaign that Sandlin organised, the judge fined him an extra $20,000.

Sandlin was released from custody on December 3, 2024.

On January 20, 2025, after beginning his second term in office, President Trump issued pardons to Sandlin and roughly 1,500 other individuals charged with crimes connected to January 6.

He appears in the 2023 documentary The Insurrectionist Next Door.

== Personal life ==
Sandlin was aged 35 in 2022. Sandlin normally lived in Las Vegas, but had been living in Millington, Tennessee, since 2020.

As of December 2022, Sandlin owed $500,000 in unpaid taxes.

== See also ==
- List of cases of the January 6 United States Capitol attack (M-S)
- Criminal proceedings in the January 6 United States Capitol attack
- List of people granted executive clemency in the second Trump presidency
