= Andrew Callaghan =

American journalist and YouTuber (born 1997)

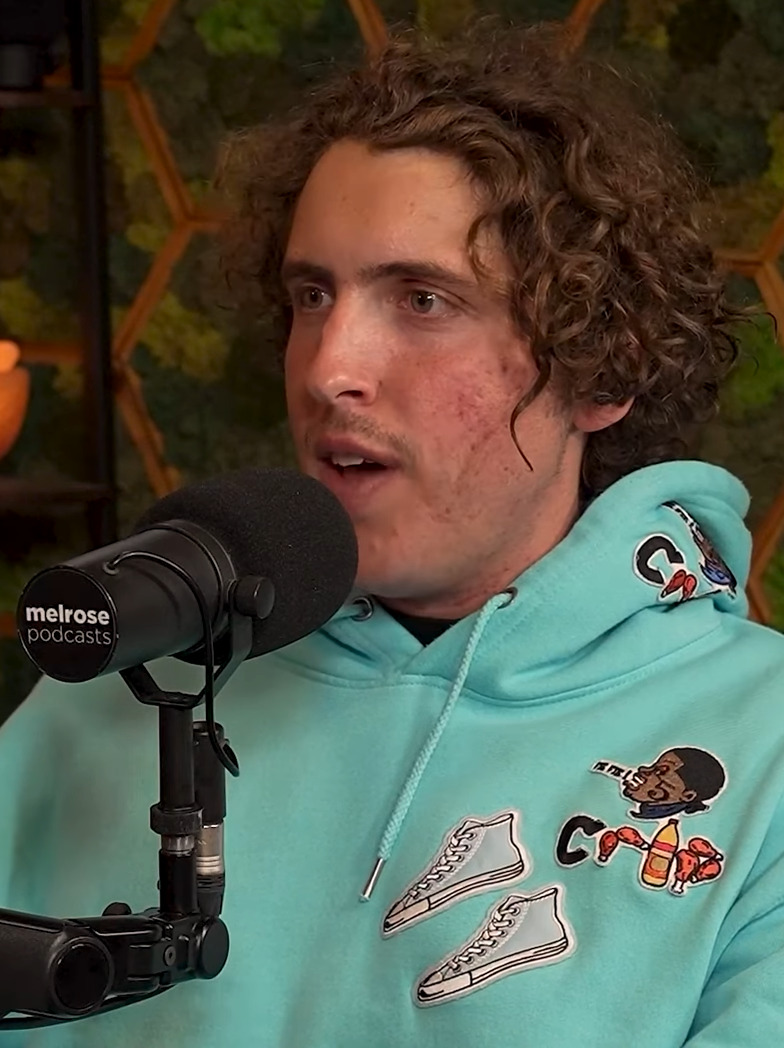
- Callaghan in 2025
- Born: Andrew Thomas Callaghan; April 23, 1997 (age 29); Philadelphia, Pennsylvania, U.S.
- Education: Loyola University
- Occupation: Journalist
- Years active: 2019–present
- Notable work: All Gas No Brakes; Channel 5 This Place Rules; Dear Kelly

YouTube information
- Channel: Channel 5 with Andrew Callaghan
- Years active: 2021–present
- Genres: Gonzo journalism; satirical social commentary; alternative news
- Subscribers: 3.52 million
- Views: 538 million
- Last updated: May 11, 2026

Andrew Thomas Callaghan (born April 23, 1997) is an American alternative media journalist and YouTube personality. He is the creator and host of the YouTube series Channel 5 and All Gas No Brakes. Beginning as a man-on-the-street interviewer in New Orleans, Callaghan built an audience covering subcultural and political events across the United States, and by December 2025, Channel 5's YouTube subscriber count had surpassed three million, a figure Columbia Journalism Review noted exceeded that of The Washington Post on the platform.

Callaghan first gained attention for Quarter Confessions, a viral Bourbon Street interview series, and later for All Gas No Brakes, a road-trip documentary show he lost control of after a contract dispute with the production company Doing Things Media. He subsequently launched Channel 5 in 2021, through which he has interviewed figures including Alex Jones, Hunter Biden, and Pete Buttigieg, and produced the feature documentaries This Place Rules (2022), about the January 6 United States Capitol attack, and Dear Kelly (2025), a profile of a man radicalized by conspiracy theories following a home foreclosure. Callaghan has described his own approach as a "radical empathy agenda" and has disputed characterizations of his work as gonzo journalism. (Note: Channel 5 with Andrew Callaghan (July 10, 2026). We're Being Sued – via YouTube.)

== Early life ==
Andrew Thomas Callaghan was born in Philadelphia on April 23, 1997, and grew up in the Capitol Hill neighborhood of Seattle. He is of Irish and Italian descent. In ninth grade, Callaghan's parents enrolled him at the Northwest School, a small private school in Capitol Hill. Around this time he met a future collaborator, Evan Gilbert-Katz, at a soccer field in Seattle. As a teenager, Callaghan also aspired to work as a rapper or graffiti artist and recorded an EP with two friends under the name Self Evident.

Callaghan has said that he "hated every class from the first day of kindergarten to [his] last day of college" except for a journalism class taught by a teacher named Calvin Shaw, which he began in ninth grade and continued taking throughout high school (although he later clarified he was bored by most of the required core curriculum, but once allowed to pursue his own interests, he did enjoy things like astronomy, creative writing, and New Orleans mythology). Shaw allowed Callaghan to leave campus to report on stories of his own choosing, telling his students only that they needed a story by the end of the week. The teacher of that journalism class convinced him to pursue his passion for journalism. During high school and a gap year before college, he interviewed people associated with the darknet market Silk Road, Occupy Seattle protesters, and juggalos, and wrote about homelessness and freight-train hopping in Seattle. He later relocated to New Orleans, where he studied journalism on a full scholarship at Loyola University and worked as a doorman at Bourbon House Seafood on Bourbon Street to support himself. He was a contributing writer for The Maroon, Loyola's university newspaper.

== Career ==
=== Quarter Confessions ===
While working as a doorman on Bourbon Street, Callaghan saw what he described as "hellish scenes" and wanted to find a funny or clever way to document them. He quit his job and began interviewing people on the streets of the city about their secrets while they were intoxicated, which he compiled into a YouTube and Instagram series called Quarter Confessions, named after its location in the French Quarter. Other accounts credit the show's creation to Callaghan's college friend, the filmmaker Michael Moises, who invited Callaghan to join the series as a host after starting it in 2018.

=== All Gas No Brakes ===
In 2019, Callaghan published All Gas, No Brakes: A Hitchhiker's Diary, a memoir-zine recounting stories from a 70-day hitchhiking trip across America that he undertook two years prior at the age of 19. The idea for the YouTube series All Gas No Brakes was conceived from this memoir, before beginning his journalism studies at university. Quarter Confessions led to a partnership between Callaghan and Doing Things Media, who agreed to fund All Gas No Brakes. Doing Things Media provided Callaghan with a $45,000 salary, a $10,000 production budget, equipment, and a recreational vehicle. Nic Mosher, a college friend, became the series' cameraman, and Evan Gilbert-Katz, Callaghan's childhood friend from Seattle, later joined as lead producer. The first episode was filmed at the Burning Man festival in Nevada. The series went on to cover subjects including the Storm Area 51 gathering, the Midwest FurFest furry convention, and a "Donald Trump Jr. Book Club" meetup.

In early 2020, Callaghan started an All Gas No Brakes podcast in response to travel restrictions stemming from the COVID-19 pandemic. On the podcast, he interviewed past subjects from his All Gas No Brakes series via video call.

During the George Floyd protests in May 2020, Callaghan travelled to Minneapolis after concluding that mainstream news coverage was too focused on looting and fires without examining the protesters' grievances. Callaghan and his crew filmed the protests, producing an episode that videographer Nate Kahn described as a shift towards serious on-the-ground news coverage. According to people involved with the show, producer Reid Hailey of Doing Things Media subsequently expressed discomfort with its serious content and asked Callaghan to focus on "party content". Callaghan attempted to renegotiate his contract in late 2020, but he and his crew were locked out of the franchise's social media accounts and fired in March 2021. Hailey later said that the company was "really bummed it didn't work out with Andrew".

In March 2021, Callaghan announced that he and his team were no longer involved with production of All Gas No Brakes or its planned television adaptation. He stated that he had signed an employment contract with a production company without reading it and subsequently lost control of the show's accounts and income, including Patreon and YouTube revenue. Callaghan also said that Nic and Evan, who had lived in the show's RV and produced its original material, were no longer involved.

On March 23, 2021, details of Callaghan's contract emerged in The New York Times. Doing Things Media had signed him to a contract granting him a $45,000 salary plus expenses covered in exchange for the intellectual property rights to the All Gas No Brakes brand. Callaghan was required to produce a set amount of content, but was otherwise granted creative freedom. The Patreon page set up for the show also paid out a further 20% to Callaghan, 20% to the crew, and 60% to Doing Things Media.

In 2025, Callaghan reacquired the rights to the All Gas No Brakes brand. He subsequently announced plans to relaunch it as an "affiliate program" of Channel 5, describing it as an outlet for "subcultural deep dives on the American Fringe," distinct from Channel 5's growing focus on political and breaking news.

=== Abso Lutely Productions and This Place Rules ===
In May 2020, Doing Things Media and Abso Lutely Productions entered a deal to develop a television series based on All Gas No Brakes. Callaghan said the partnership began when Eric Wareheim, one half of the comedy duo Tim & Eric alongside Tim Heidecker, privately messaged him on Twitter to ask about creating a television series. As the co-founders of Abso Lutely, Wareheim, Heidecker, and Dave Kneebone would serve as executive producers; Callaghan, Reid Hailey, and Max Benator would serve as executive producers for Doing Things Media. Following Callaghan's departure from Doing Things Media, Heidecker confirmed that Abso Lutely would still be working with Callaghan on "something major".

On the Fear& podcast in July 2021, Callaghan revealed he had created a documentary film with Abso Lutely about the 2020 United States presidential election.

The title was later revealed to be This Place Rules. Directed and executive produced by Callaghan, the film followed him as he interviewed people involved in events leading up to the January 6 United States Capitol attack. It was released by HBO Max and A24 on December 30, 2022, with Jonah Hill being added to the list of executive producers.

On January 5, 2023 the first of several accusations of sexual assault and sexual coercion by Callaghan surfaced. On January 12, Tim Heidecker said on his weekly Office Hours Live podcast that he and his comedy partner Eric Wareheim have “no plans” to work with Callaghan in the future, effectively ending Callaghan's relationship with Abso Lutely Productions.

=== Channel 5 ===
Callaghan released the first content for Channel 5 through Patreon on April 5, 2021, in a style similar to All Gas No Brakes. Its first YouTube episode, covering spring breakers in Miami, was uploaded on April 11, 2021, and briefly removed over accusations of spreading COVID-19 misinformation before being reinstated five days later.

Its subscriber count grew from roughly 1.5 million in June 2022 to 1.93 million by July 2022, when Callaghan earned approximately $100,000 per month through Patreon, to 2.2 million by December 2022 and more than three million by December 2025.

The channel has covered subjects including the Satanic Temple's "SatanCon" gathering in Scottsdale, Arizona, the National Rifle Association's annual convention, dueling pro-choice and anti-abortion demonstrators following the overturning of Roe v. Wade, the aftermath of the mass shooting at Robb Elementary School in Uvalde, Texas, and drill rappers associated with O-Block, a Chicago housing project. Callaghan also reported from Ukraine during the Russian invasion, interviewing the mayor of Lviv and refugees, partnered with Vice Media co-founder Shane Smith on coverage of Greenland, and launched a Spanish-language edition of Channel 5.

Channel 5 has staged live touring events combining screenings of unreleased material with audience-participation segments, beginning with a 2022 show featuring nudist musician Will Blunderfield. A February 2026 stop in Medford, Massachusetts included the premiere of a documentary about a man's search for his lost pet parrot, a preview of an All Gas No Brakes relaunch video on the "adult baby" subculture, and a question-and-answer session with WBZ NewsRadio reporter Matt Shearer. Callaghan launched C5.NOW, a streaming platform for independent creators on July 20 2026, and has partnered Channel 5 with the news-aggregation service Ground News.

In 2025, Callaghan launched 5CAST, a long-form interview offshoot; guests have included Alex Jones (twice), Hunter Biden, Nick Shirley, Shia LaBeouf, and Pete Buttigieg. His interview with Jones drew criticism, particularly for a This Place Rules scene showing Callaghan lifting weights and drinking whiskey with him. Asked by WBUR how the Sandy Hook parents might feel about it, Callaghan said the families' lawyer, Mark Bankston, had told him he "loved the scene". Callaghan has argued that "deplatforming" extremists is often counterproductive and pushes their audiences toward less moderated platforms.

Some Patreon subscribers criticized Callaghan for not pressing former Transportation Secretary Pete Buttigieg hard enough in a Channel 5 interview, and Callaghan considered not releasing it before doing so; he later said Buttigieg had appeared "because he wanted to connect with a different demographic" but Buttigieg "wasn't necessarily very open with his answers".

An August 2025 interview with Hunter Biden drew wider attention after Melania Trump threatened to sue Biden for defamation over claims, attributed to writer Michael Wolff, about how she met her husband, Donald Trump, and demanded Callaghan remove the interview; Callaghan instead invited Biden back on to reject the demand. Callaghan called the situation "unbelievably preposterous" and said he was unsure whether newer outlets like his were "braver or stupider" than legacy publications in resisting such threats. He also said The New York Times had spiked an op-ed he wrote on the space for independent news, telling him the paper needed to "pick its battles". A Times spokesman said the paper does not discuss why submissions do not run.

On September 7, 2026, Hunter Biden, whom Callaghan had befriended through several long-form interviews on Channel 5, (Note: Channel 5 with Andrew Callaghan (September 9, 2026). Addressing Hunter Biden Crypto Coin – via YouTube.) launched $LAPTOP, a Meme coin he promoted as a "symbol of resilience, redemption, and recovery". Callaghan said Biden had asked him for a list of subscriber emails to promote the coin as a way to "give back" with "free money", and that he provided 5,000 emails from Channel 5 merchandise customers. The coin surged to $222 before crashing to $1.79 within three hours of its September 9 launch. Callaghan said backlash from subscribers led him to have the list deleted before any promotional message was sent, and that Channel 5 does not endorse cryptocurrency as a safe investment.

=== Other projects ===
Callaghan and Gilbert-Katz have developed an adult animated series called All City Kings, based on their adolescence in Seattle's graffiti scene, with Callaghan voicing a character named West Side. Callaghan has also said he plans to publish annual zine collections of Channel 5 material on a five-year delay, beginning with material from 2020.

=== Dear Kelly ===
During production of This Place Rules, Callaghan and his team began developing a documentary about Kelly Johnson, whom they had interviewed at a White Lives Matter rally in Huntington Beach, California in 2021. Johnson, who called himself "Kelly J. Patriot", is described as a QAnon adherent and participant in the January 6 United States Capitol attack. The film examines Johnson's claim that financier Bill Joiner used falsified documents in connection with a loan during the Great Recession to seize Johnson's house. This allegedly occurred at the same time that Johnson was going through disbarment, separation from his wife, and subsequent radicalization.

Callaghan's first filmed interview with Johnson took place on April 11, 2021. Over the following years, Johnson's children and ex-wife participated in an intervention urging him to seek treatment, which was filmed for the documentary. Johnson subsequently entered rehabilitation, although Callaghan later said he moved to Arizona and remained involved in far-right politics. Dear Kelly was released through DearKellyFilm.com on January 15, 2025, and became the highest-grossing direct-to-consumer documentary since Kony 2012 during its opening weekend. Callaghan subsequently screened the film at 36 events, modifying elements of the edit in response to audience reactions.

After the film's trailer was released, Joiner sued Callaghan and the documentary's producers in federal court. The lawsuit was dismissed on May 19, 2026, after Callaghan and Channel 5 incurred more than $800,000 in legal costs. Joiner filed a second lawsuit in California state court on July 9, alleging defamation, stalking, false light, and trespassing. The following day, Callaghan published "We're Being Sued", stating that Channel 5 faced financial difficulties from the litigation and linking to a GoFundMe campaign for legal fees. The campaign raised nearly $1 million from more than 28,000 donors within six hours.

== Style ==
Callaghan has cited gonzo journalist Hunter S. Thompson, documentary maker Louis Theroux, and anarchist art-collective and filmmakers Indecline as influences upon his own documentary style and works. Theroux has also described Callaghan as "Gonzo journalist par excellence". Writing in Esquire in 2022, journalist Rowan Moore Gerety compared Callaghan's work to that of Louis Theroux and the early documentaries of Vice. Callaghan has described his own relationship to journalism ambivalently, saying, "I'm a journalist, but I'm not always a journalist," and that "no one hates me more than journalists".

Callaghan has disputed the characterization of his work as Gonzo journalism. In July 2026, in a video discussing a lawsuit against Channel 5, Callaghan stated, "No, I'm not a Gonzo journalist", describing gonzo journalism as combining nonfiction with fictional or fantasy elements.

Writing in the Columbia Journalism Review in December 2025, Kyle Paoletta described Channel 5 as "the best proof of concept for YouTube becoming a place where rigorous journalism demands attention from political figures". Callaghan has said he believes legacy news organizations "still do vital work" but have been too slow to compete with the volume and variety of other content that keeps viewers informed, telling Paoletta: "The media's not dead. It's just morphing".

== Political views ==
Reuters described Callaghan in April 2026 as a "left-wing social media commentator," after an earlier version of its report had misidentified him as conservative. In a 2026 interview, Callaghan said that although he tries to avoid political labels, "it seems that a lot of people think that I'm a leftist, which is true, probably".

As a teenager in Seattle, Callaghan was moved by the killing of John T. Williams, a 55-year-old deaf Native American woodcarver, by a Seattle police officer, into protesting and joining a black bloc group. From there, Callaghan became an anarchist and began reading material from authors such as Emma Goldman, Angela Davis, and Ruth Wilson Gilmore. Later in life, Callaghan moved away from the anarchist viewpoint, stating that he "grew up to realize how incompatible that anarchistic worldview is with reality and with American society. It can only exist in a small, little chamber. You can’t apply that to the industrial heartland of the country". Although Callaghan no longer identifies as an anarchist, he supports radical prison reform and values elements of prison abolitionist theory.

In a 2022 interview, Callaghan stated that he supports Black liberation and critiques what he calls “white liberalism” in cities like Seattle, where he feels progressive rhetoric masks gentrification and rent-gouging that displaces marginalized communities.

Callaghan voted for Jill Stein in the 2024 United States Presidential election; however, he thereafter expressed regret in his decision. Callaghan stated that he found Stein's rhetoric impressive during a pre-election interview, particularly regarding the Gaza war, and felt comfortable giving her a protest vote as he lived in a "safe" blue state. However, following the election, Callaghan was dismayed by the Trump administration and by Stein's post-election irrelevance. Callaghan stated this had been his first time voting for a third-party candidate.

== Personal life ==
Callaghan has said that he experimented with psilocybin around the age of 13, and suffers from hallucinogen persisting perception disorder as a result.

== Allegations of rape and sexual misconduct ==
In January 2023, two women posted TikTok videos accusing Callaghan of trying to pressure them into having sex with him. A reporter at The Stranger then interviewed two other women who alleged that Callaghan tried to pressure them into having sex with him and made them uncomfortable. On January 12, his legal representative responded to the allegations in a statement released to Variety, saying in part: "Conversations about pressure and consent are extremely important and Andrew wants to have these conversations, so he can continue to learn and grow. While every dynamic is open to interpretation and proper communication is critical from all those involved, repeated requests for money should not be part of these conversations". On January 15, Callaghan responded to the allegations in a YouTube video, stating that some of the allegations about him are "not true" or "missing important contextual information"; he apologized for his behavior and revealed plans to attend therapy and Alcoholics Anonymous.

On February 28, The Stranger published an additional story with two more women accusing Callaghan of rape and sexual assault that took place at Loyola University in 2017. One woman alleged Callaghan raped her while she was heavily intoxicated, and later mocked how she repeatedly said "No" during the assault. Another woman alleged that Callaghan followed her to her dorm room and refused to leave, before grabbing her and sexually assaulting her as she cried and told him 'No' "at least three times". The allegations were corroborated by dated text messages and email exchanges, interviews with health professionals and personal associates, and a journal entry. Callaghan's legal representative denied the allegations as "patently false", stating "Andrew has taken accountability for his role in other situations and will be the first to admit his shortcomings; however, these accusations go further and are completely without merit. Andrew will utilize every option he has in order to clear his name and protect his reputation".

In a 2026 interview, Callaghan said he had "taken accountability" for his conduct and discussed the power dynamics created by his fame.

== Filmography ==
Year	Work	Role	Notes
2019–2020	All Gas No Brakes	Himself	Creator and host
2021–present	Channel 5	Himself	Creator and host
2022	This Place Rules	Himself	Director, executive producer Documentary
2025	Dear Kelly	Himself	Director and writer
2025	Surrounded	Himself	Episode "1 Journalist vs 20 Conspiracy Theorists"

== Awards and nominations ==
Year	Title	Award	Category	Result	Ref.
2021	Channel 5 with Andrew Callaghan	11th Streamy Awards	News	Won	
2022	Channel 5 with Andrew Callaghan	12th Streamy Awards	News	Nominated	
