= Four Hours at the Capitol =

HBO documentary regarding the 2021 United States Capitol attack

- Poster
- Directed by: Jamie Roberts
- Composer: David Schweitzer

Production
- Executive producers: Dan Reed; Nancy Abraham; Lisa Heller
- Producer: Jamie Roberts
- Editor: Will Grayburn
- Running time: 88 minutes
- Production company: HBO Documentary Films

Original release
- Release: October 20, 2021

Four Hours at the Capitol is an HBO original documentary film produced in association with the BBC and directed by Jamie Roberts. It was released on October 20, 2021. The film chronicles the 2021 United States Capitol attack and focuses on the hours of 1-5 p.m. through an assortment of footage from that day, some previously unseen, in addition to testimonies from some rioters, law enforcement officers, Members of Congress and staffers who were inside the Capitol Complex.

== Background ==
The film includes interviews with Buddy Carter, Rosa DeLauro, Dick Durbin, Ruben Gallego, Jim McGovern, Lisa Blunt Rochester, Chuck Schumer and Eric Swalwell.

== Reception ==
As of November 2021, 89% of the 18 reviews compiled on Rotten Tomatoes are positive. The website's critics consensus reads: "While Four Hours at the Capitol may not provide the most cogent thesis on the January 6 attack, it provides a thorough and visceral record of that infamous day's events."

== Accolades ==
It was nominated by the Critics Choice Association for "Best Political Documentary", and for Best Current Affairs at the 2022 British Academy Television Awards.

== See also ==
Other documentary films about the Capitol attack:

- Day of Rage: How Trump Supporters Took the U.S. Capitol (2021)
- This Place Rules (2022)
- A Storm Foretold (2023)
- The Insurrectionist Next Door (2023)
- The Sixth (2024)
