= Ray Epps (military veteran) =

American January 6 Capitol rioter

- Born: James Ray Epps; May 28, 1961 (age 65)
- Spouse: Robyn Epps (wife)
- Military career
- Branch: United States Marine Corps
- Known for: Conspiracy theories related to his involvement in the January 6 United States Capitol attack

James Ray Epps (born May 28, 1961) is a U.S. Marine veteran and former Oath Keepers chapter president who was one of the rioters at the United States Capitol on January 6, 2021. Epps served as a United States Marine for four years.

Following January 6, conspiracy theories were shared on Twitter and by then-Fox News host Tucker Carlson, accusing Epps of being an agent provocateur and linking his wife to Dominion Voting Systems. In July 2023, Epps sued Fox News for defamation. On November 27, 2024, the lawsuit was dismissed for failure to prove "actual malice". In September 2023, Epps was charged with and pleaded guilty to a single misdemeanor count of disorderly conduct for his participation in the attack, and was sentenced to a year of probation by Judge James Boasberg.

On January 20, 2025, the first day of the second presidency of Donald Trump, Epps was pardoned along with more than 1,500 others who received pardons or commutations regarding the events of January 6.

== Early life and career ==
Epps was born in 1961 as James Ray Epps. Epps served in the United States Marine Corps from 1979 to 1983 before opening a wedding venue business in Queen Creek, Arizona, with his wife, Robyn Epps. In May 2022, Epps and his wife moved from Arizona, closing their business and relocating to a trailer in the Rocky Mountains.

== January 6 ==
On January 5, 2021, in Washington, DC, Epps was filmed participating in two street gatherings. At one of the gatherings, he told the crowd, "We're here to storm the Capitol", and urged people to "go into the Capitol" the next day. Some voices in the crowd reacted by repeatedly chanting "Fed!" and accusing him of working for the federal government. Epps said in an interview for 60 Minutes that he traveled to the Capitol because he believed the election had been stolen from Trump.

In the early afternoon of January 6, 2021, Epps was filmed in desert camouflage clothing, telling a group of people that when "the President is done speaking, we go to the Capitol". In another video on that day, Epps was filmed moving towards police barricades around the Capitol, and talking to another protester, Ryan Samsel. He was part of the crowd surrounding the Capitol, but he did not enter the building.

== Jan 6 aftermath ==
Epps was included on an FBI list of wanted suspects. Two days later, Epps said he called the FBI to say that he had told Samsel to calm down. Samsel corroborated this in an FBI interview later that month, stating that Epps had told him "Relax, the cops are doing their job”. During his phone call with the FBI, Epps repeated claims that the election was stolen.

On multiple occasions, starting in June 2021, Fox News host Tucker Carlson shared unsubstantiated conjectures about the Capitol attack being set up by agent provocateurs, and that Epps was a government agent. In January 2022, Carlson stated that Epps had "stage-managed the insurrection."

During a House Oversight hearing in October 2021, video footage of Epps was shown prior to Republican Congressman Thomas Massie asking Attorney General Merrick Garland why Epps had not been charged with any crime. Garland refused to comment on charges against any specific individual during the hearing. A month later, right-leaning Revolver magazine published an article with the headline "Meet Ray Epps: The Fed-Protected Provocateur Who Appears To Have Led The Very First 1/6 Attack On The U.S. Capitol."

In January 2022, rumors about FBI involvement and Epps were dismissed by the United States House Select Committee on the January 6 Attack. By then, Epps and his wife were living in hiding, after receiving death threats due to the belief that he was an agent provocateur associated with the attack. In July the same year, the Associated Press debunked claims shared via Twitter that Epps was in communication with Nancy Pelosi's office prior to the January 6 attack. Both USA Today and Reuters published fact checks explaining that Epps' wife worked for Dominion Enterprises not Dominion Voting Systems.

Epps accused Republican U.S. representatives Thomas Massie, Matt Gaetz and Marjorie Taylor Greene of spreading lies about him.

=== Defamation lawsuit ===
Epps' lawyers served a cease and desist letter to Fox News on March 23, 2023, demanding that they stop repeating "malicious lies about his involvement in the events of January 6th." In July 2023, Epps commenced litigation against Fox News, after he accused Tucker Carlson and other hosts of perpetuating false claims that Epps was an agent provocateur, working for the Federal Bureau of Investigation (FBI). According to the FBI, Epps "has never been an FBI source or an FBI employee". Epps hired the same legal counsel that Dominion Voting Systems used in their successful litigation against Fox News. Michael Teter, Epps' lawyer, said, "The fact that people like Joe Rogan continue to propagate the lie that Ray Epps participated in a false flag operation to instigate the Jan. 6 riots demonstrates the widespread and lasting harm that Fox News has done to Ray".

On November 27, 2024, a federal judge dismissed the defamation lawsuit, saying Epps did not provide enough evidence that Fox and Carlson had engaged with malice.

=== Misdemeanor charge ===
Ray Epps was interviewed on the April 23, 2023 episode of CBS's 60 Minutes television program. Several months later, federal prosecutors filed an information, charging Epps with a single misdemeanor count of disorderly conduct on restricted grounds. Epps pleaded guilty to the charge the next day, on September 20, 2023. On January 9, 2024, Epps was sentenced to one year of probation. In 2025, President Donald Trump pardoned all Capitol attack defendants, including Epps.

== Views ==
Epps was a supporter of Donald Trump and voted for him in the 2016 and 2020 presidential elections. In 2011, Epps was the president of the Arizona chapter of the anti-government Oath Keepers militia. He told People that he left the Oath Keepers after reaching the conclusion that the group was "too radical".

Epps stated that he experienced a "life-changing reality shift" when the "Trump cult" turned on him and his wife. He added that he regretted his actions on January 6, knew that Joe Biden won the 2020 election, and hoped to help others "learn the truth" of the election results.

== See also ==
- Kevin James Lyons, another Capitol rioter who became the subject of conspiracy theories
- List of cases of the January 6 United States Capitol attack (A-F)
- Criminal proceedings in the January 6 United States Capitol attack
- List of people granted executive clemency in the second Trump presidency
