= Will Blunderfield =

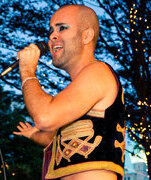
- Blunderfield performing in Vancouver in 2010

Background information
- Born: Mark William Kent Blunderfield; July 18, 1985 (age 41); Vancouver, British Columbia, Canada
- Genres: World, pop, mantras
- Occupations: Singer-songwriter, yoga teacher, performance artist
- Instruments: Vocals, piano, synthesizer, harmonium
- Years active: 2009–present
- Labels: Sony Music; Nettwerk/Nutone Records; Warner Music Group; Spirit Voyage Records
- Website: www.willblunderfield.ca

Mark William Kent Blunderfield (born July 18, 1985) is a Canadian singer-songwriter and yoga teacher. He is signed to Nettwerk Records/Sony Music (WMG) with music released through Spirit Voyage Records. Since 2021, Blunderfield has received media attention for his "male rewilding" practice, which uses methods including semen retention to help men "connect with their bodies and each other".

== Education ==
At 17, Blunderfield moved from Vancouver to New York City to study theatre on scholarship at the American Musical and Dramatic Academy. His original plan was to pursue a career on Broadway, but he soon changed his mind and decided to pursue music and yoga, a discipline which he was introduced to while at the school.

Blunderfield holds certifications in Hatha Yoga, Kundalini Yoga, Sexual Kung Fu under Loren Johnson and Mantak Chia, Jon Kabat-Zinn's Mindfulness-based stress reduction (MBSR), and Compassionate Inquiry under Gabor Maté. He has a degree in psychology, Sexuality and Human Nutrition from the University of British Columbia.

== Career ==
Blunderfield performs and teaches around the world at workshops, retreats and conferences. He became a yoga enthusiast in the Bikram school, but now teaches a blend of Bikram Yoga and his own invented style. In late 2010, Nettwerk Music Group CEO and yoga enthusiast Terry McBride signed Blunderfield to the label's yoga-inspired Nutone Records.

In May 2011, he recorded a duet with Bif Naked for the international version of his album Hallelujah. He has charted primarily in the world music, new age and occasionally mainstream charts. Blunderfield's album was released in July 2011 worldwide and debuted at number one on the iTunes world music chart. From 2012, Blunderfield achieved success in Japan, where he has toured and received extensive radio play.

In 2015, Blunderfield starred in the primetime Japanese reality show Why Did You Come to Japan? (YOUは何しに日本へ?). He released a theme song in conjunction with the show titled "Story," written by Japanese singer Ai.

He performs original compositions inspired by devotional chant, world music, musical theater, and mantra music during savasana.

In February 2018, Blunderfield released the title track of his second full-length album, a cover of Wild Horses by The Rolling Stones. The song and album were produced by Brian West, Mike Southworth, and Adam Stanton.

Blunderfield has attracted attention for his "Men's Work" practice, which emphasizes a method he calls "naked rewilding". He frequently posts accounts of his workshops and activities, including mutual masturbation and urophagia, to Instagram. Blunderfield has received media coverage for his men's work practice, including The Joe Rogan Experience. Blunderfield's "erotic male bonding" was also the subject of a Channel 5 News YouTube documentary, and interviews and documentaries on mainstream outlets including the BBC and CBC.

== Activism ==
Blunderfield has frequently performed in support of charity organizations in British Columbia. He partnered with YYoga to contribute tracks on Listen to Understand, a Kirtan-inspired collection of inspirational music, which was released in late 2010. Proceeds from album sales went to the BC Children's Hospital.

Blunderfield was a spokesperson for a Vancouver-based tolerance organization, The Diversity Project. He has also performed in support of LGBTQ youth in Canadian high schools. He has supported a number of Yoga-related charities.

== Discography ==
- Hallelujah (2010)
- Hallelujah (2011) (International Nettwerk Records version)
- Amazing Grace EP Nettwerk (2012)
- Story EP (2015)
- Dancing in the Rain EP (2015) (Asia)
- Wild Horses (2018)
- Will Blunderfield / Tej Randhir & Friends: Live at The Cultch (2019)
- Aquarian Sadhana (2019)
- Wild Horses (The Remixes) EP (2019)
- Hallelujah (10th Anniversary Extended Edition) (2020)
- Greatest Hits & Other Delights (2020)
- Live In Japan (2023)
- God Cock (2024)
- I Love Smelling My Farts (2025)
- Peeing With My Bros (2025)
- Urine Therapy (2025)
- Your Hummus Is Mine! (2025)
- Home Is Where Healing Comes From (A Song For Mom and Dad) (2025)
- Èirichidh Sinn Còmhla! (We Rise Together!) (2025)
- We Love Our Cocks & Balls (2025)
