= Kevin James Lyons =

American Capitol rioter (born 1980)

- Born: 1980 (age 45–46)
- Occupation: HVAC technician
- Known for: Participation in the January 6 United States Capitol attack
- Status: Released
- Criminal charges: Obstructing an official proceeding
- Penalty: 51 months in prison

Kevin James Lyons (born 1980) is an American HVAC technician and convicted felon who stole a photograph of Congressman John Lewis from house speaker Nancy Pelosi's office as he participated in the January 6 United States Capitol attack, for which he was found guilty of obstructing an official proceeding and theft. On July 14, 2023, Lyons was sentenced to 51 months in prison. He was released on August 27, 2024, having serving just over one year.

On January 20, 2025, the first day of the second presidency of Donald Trump, Lyons was pardoned along with nearly every other participant in the Capitol riot.

== Family life and career ==
Kevin James Lyons was born in 1982 or 1983. In 2021, he lived in the Gladstone Park neighbourhood of Jefferson Park, Chicago, working in the city as a Heating, ventilation, and air conditioning technician. He is a father to two sons.

== 2021 Capitol attack ==
Lyons participated in the January 6 United States Capitol attack and stole a photograph of Congressman John Lewis and a staff member's wallet containing approximately $150 during the riot. During the attack, Lyons was belligerent towards the Capitol Police, calling them "Nazis" and "SS". Lyons filmed his activities inside the Capitol building; his footage was used in the trial of rioter Riley Williams.

Lyons operated the Instagram account @chi_hvac and the FBI identified him from a post he shared featuring a sign outside Pelosi's office, arrested him in January 2021, and charged him with theft. On July 14, 2023, judge Beryl Howell found Lyons guilty of theft and sentenced him to four years and three months in prison. Howell had previously found Lyons guilty of six charges of obstructing an official proceeding, in April 2023. In court, Lyons described himself as an "idiot".

Lyons was the first person from Illinois to be charged with crimes associated with the Capitol attack and his sentence was the longest given to any Capitol rioter from the state until the sentencing of Shane Jason Woods later that year.

In November 2023, a conspiracy theory claimed Lyons, seen on video holding a vape pen, was an undercover FBI agent holding a badge. The theory was promoted by far-right political figures including Senator Mike Lee of Utah and Representative Marjorie Taylor Greene of Georgia.

On August 27, 2024, Lyons was released after serving just over one year in prison.

On January 20, 2025, the first day of the second presidency of Donald Trump, Lyons was pardoned along with nearly every other participant in the Capitol riot.

== See also ==
- Ray Epps (military veteran), another Capitol rioter who became the subject of conspiracy theories
- List of cases of the January 6 United States Capitol attack (G-L)
- Criminal proceedings in the January 6 United States Capitol attack
- List of people granted executive clemency in the second Trump presidency
