= Day of Rage: How Trump Supporters Took the U.S. Capitol =

2021 documentary short film

- YouTube thumbnail
- Directed by: David Botti; Malachy Browne
- Produced by: David Botti; Malachy Browne; Stella Cooper; Cora Engelbrecht; Evan Hill; Christiaan Triebert; Haley Willis
- Narrated by: Malachy Browne
- Edited by: Dmitriy Khavin; Natalie Reneau
- Release date: June 30, 2021 (online)
- Running time: 41 minutes
- Country: United States
- Language: English

Day of Rage: How Trump Supporters Took the U.S. Capitol is a 2021 American documentary short film about the January 6 Capitol attack by supporters of Donald Trump, reported by The New York Times. Critical reception for the film has been mostly positive.

== Summary ==
The film is the result of a six-month investigation of these events using videos posted on social media by the rioters themselves, police body camera footage, and archived audio from police communications, alongside news coverage.

By combining District of Columbia police radio communications with real-time footage, the film illustrates how law enforcement officers attempted, and ultimately failed, to prevent the January 6 United States Capitol attack.

To maximize viewers' understanding of the events, the filmmakers also utilized a detailed 3D model of the Capitol complex. This 3D model was synchronized with footage and audio to show the precise movements of the rioters as they advanced through the building. By mapping the attackers’ progress onto a virtual representation of the Capitol, the documentary aims to produce a comprehensive, moment-by-moment visualization of the breach, illustrating how different groups converged and overran security barriers.

== Reception ==
Metro Weekly gave the film four stars out of five, praising it as "brilliantly constructed" and stating that it "offers a more compelling and scrupulous account of the Capitol riot than many of the lawmakers who were in the building that day". It was shortlisted for the Academy Award for Best Documentary Short Subject, but ultimately was not nominated. The video had earned 68,000 comments on YouTube. The video also won the Alfred I. duPont–Columbia University Award and Peabody Award. It was nominated for two News & Documentary Emmy Awards the following year.

== See also ==
Other documentary films about the Capitol attack:

- Four Hours at the Capitol (2021)
- This Place Rules (2022)
- A Storm Foretold (2023)
- The Insurrectionist Next Door (2023)
- The Sixth (2024)
