= A Storm Foretold =

2023 documentary film

- Film poster
- Directed by: Christoffer Guldbrandsen
- Written by: Christoffer Guldbrandsen
- Produced by: Peter Engel; Christoffer Guldbrandsen; Henrik Veileborg
- Cinematography: Frederik Marbell
- Edited by: Malene Lykke Dreyer; Andreas Jonsson Hay
- Music by: Kristian Eidnes
- Production company: Wingman Media
- Distributed by: Abramorama
- Release dates: March 2023 (CPH:DOX); January 6, 2024 (United States)
- Running time: 99 minutes
- Language: English

A Storm Foretold is a 2023 documentary film by Danish director Christoffer Guldbrandsen examining Roger Stone, the MAGA movement, and the January 6 United States Capitol attack. Guldbrandsen and cinematographer Frederik Marbell were granted access to film Stone from 2018 through January 2021.

The film premiered at CPH:DOX in 2023, and was released in the United States in January 2024. Wingman Media produced the film and Abramorama serves as distributor.

== Reception ==
On the review aggregator website Rotten Tomatoes, 100% of 12 critics' reviews are positive, with an average rating of 8/10.

Avi Offer of NYC Movie Guru wrote, "A Storm Foretold is a provocative, enraging, timely and illuminating glimpse of Roger Stone, Donald Trump's political advisor."

Jessica Kiang of Variety wrote, "Is it possible Roger Stone — the great manipulator, the master puppeteer, the power behind the power — thinks Guldbrandsen's entertaining, at times jaw-dropping, yet deeply dismaying A Storm Foretold is going to show him in a good light? Actually what it reveals is that Stone and his set play at presidential politics like it's their private game."

== See also ==
Other documentary films about the Capitol attack:

- Day of Rage: How Trump Supporters Took the U.S. Capitol (2021)
- Four Hours at the Capitol (2021)
- This Place Rules (2022)
- The Insurrectionist Next Door (2023)
- The Sixth (2024)
