= Tariq Aziz (disambiguation) =

Tariq Aziz (1936–2015) was the Deputy Prime Minister of Iraq under Saddam Hussein.

Tariq Aziz or Tareq Aziz may also refer to:

- Tariq Aziz (cricketer) (born 1974), Pakistani cricketer
- Tariq Aziz (TV personality) (1936–2020), Pakistani television host
- Tariq Aziz (field hockey, born 1938), Pakistani field hockey player
- Tariq Aziz (field hockey, born 1984), Pakistani field hockey player
- Tareq Aziz (born 1983), Bangladeshi cricketer
