= Mel D. Cole =

American photographer

- Born: Syracuse, New York
- Occupation: Photographer
- Years active: 2002–present
- Website: meldcole.com

Mel D. Cole is an American documentary photographer. He originally became notable for his black and white photographs of hip hop concerts, artists, and other figures, including The Roots, Erykah Badu, Kendrick Lamar, and others. Cole later branched into photojournalism, documenting the George Floyd protests in various cities in 2020 and the January 6 United States Capitol attack in Washington, D.C. in 2021. He was named the "Editorial/Press Photographer of the Year" at the 2021 International Photography Awards.

== Early life and education ==
Mel D. Cole was born and raised in Syracuse, New York. His father owned a record store there, contributing to Cole's interest in music. Cole moved to New York City in 1999 to attend college. He also began teaching himself photography after arriving, taking photographs at hip hop shows in the city.

== Career ==
As an amateur, Cole first took photographs at hip hop concerts using a disposable camera. In 2001, he took shots of Common and Erykah Badu at SOB's in Manhattan using this method. He later acquired a digital camera, which he used to snap photographs of Kanye West at Madison Square Garden. Some of his early work was featured in Urb, and Cole often published his work on his own website, dubbed Village Slum. After meeting Questlove of the hip hop band, The Roots, Cole would eventually become known as the group's "house photographer." In 2009, Cole photographed P. Diddy's White Party in Beverly Hills.

Shooting exclusively in black and white, he would go on to photograph numerous hip hop artists, including Jay-Z, Mos Def, Beyoncé, Kendrick Lamar, Drake, J. Cole, Rihanna, and others. His work also appeared in publications like Vibe and i-D, and he worked for brands like Nike, Puma, and Converse. In 2012, Complex listed him among the "50 Greatest Music Photographers Right Now" and he was also named one of the "Top 10 Nightlife Photographers." In 2014, he held his first exhibition of his work in New York City at the menswear store, Coat of Arms. The following year, he held his first international exhibition in Sydney. That year, he was also named Trey Songz' personal photographer.

In 2019, Cole formed Charcoal Pitch FC, a wing of his photography business that would be focused on black culture in association football. That year, he photographed an A.S. Roma match in Rome and was the subject of a short documentary about the occasion. In early 2020, Cole published a collection of his hip hop photography titled, Great: Photographs of Hip Hop 2002–2019. The book was funded by a Kickstarter campaign and featured a foreword by Questlove.

In 2020, Cole began traveling the northeast United States photographing a variety of protests that developed in response to the Murder of George Floyd and the Black Lives Matter movement. He also documented election rallies for then President Donald Trump. On January 6, 2021, Cole photographed the attack on the United States Capitol. One of Cole's photographs from that event would later be featured in National Geographic's "Year in Pictures" issue. In 2021, Cole published another book of photographs titled, American Protest: Photographs 2020–2021. That year, he was named the "Editorial/Press Photographer of the Year" at the International Photography Awards.

As part of his Charcoal Pitch FC outfit, Cole partnered with Chelsea F.C. in 2021 to produce Five Boroughs, a short docuseries about black Chelsea fans in each of New York City's five boroughs. He also created a photography competition in partnership with Chelsea that year. The competition was part of the club's "No To Hate" campaign and was intended to promote inclusion and tolerance.

== Bibliography ==
Year	Title	Original publisher	ISBN
2020	GREAT: Photographs of Hip Hop 2002–2019	Haymaker	ISBN 978-1939621689
2021	American Protest: Photographs 2020–2021	Damiani	ISBN 978-8862087544
