= Obstructing an official proceeding =

Felony under U.S. federal law

Corruptly obstructing, influencing, or impeding an official proceeding is a felony under U.S. federal law. It was enacted as part of the Sarbanes–Oxley Act of 2002 in reaction to the Enron scandal, and closed a legal loophole on who could be charged with evidence tampering by defining the new crime very broadly.

This part of the Act later became known as a charge against defendants associated with the 2021 U.S. Capitol attack for attempting to obstruct that year's Electoral College vote count, as well as former President Donald Trump for broader alleged activities to obstruct the election. In June 2024, the Supreme Court ruled in Fischer v. United States that the statute could only be applied when the defendant impaired a physical document or object used in an official proceeding or attempted to do so, a higher bar for conviction than had been used in trials to that point.

== Legal basis ==
The crime is codified as 18 U.S.C. § 1512(c)(2). The relevant subsection reads:

(c) Whoever corruptly—

(1) alters, destroys, mutilates, or conceals a record, document, or other object, or attempts to do so, with the intent to impair the object's integrity or availability for use in an official proceeding; or

(2) otherwise obstructs, influences, or impedes any official proceeding, or attempts to do so,

shall be fined under this title or imprisoned not more than 20 years, or both.

The term "official proceeding" is defined in 18 U.S.C. § 1515(a)(1) to include proceedings before federal judges, Congress, federal government agencies, and regulators of insurance businesses.

== Early history ==
=== Enactment ===
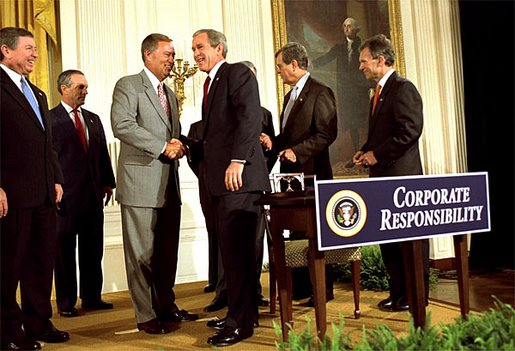
Representative Mike Oxley and President George W. Bush shake hands at the signing of the Sarbanes–Oxley Act of 2002, which created the crime of obstructing an official proceeding.

The provision was enacted by Section 1102 of the Sarbanes–Oxley Act of 2002 as a reaction to the Enron scandal, where Enron's auditor Arthur Andersen had destroyed potentially incriminating documents. It added a new subsection to the Victim and Witness Protection Act of 1982, which had already defined the term "official proceeding" and used it in describing other crimes. In a signing statement, President George W. Bush stated that the term "corruptly" would be construed as requiring proof of a criminal state of mind, in order to avoid infringing on the constitutional right to petition.

Prior to the Sarbanes–Oxley Act, anyone who corruptly persuaded others to destroy, alter, or conceal evidence could be prosecuted, but the individuals actually performing the act, or individuals acting alone, could not be prosecuted. The new provision closed this loophole by defining the new crime very broadly. The case Arthur Andersen LLP v. United States, which was prosecuted under an older subsection of the law, resulted in Arthur Andersen's conviction being overturned by the Supreme Court in 2005 because flawed jury instructions did not account for that subsection's requirement that the action be taken not only "corruptly" but "knowingly".

=== Use prior to 2021 ===
In the 2010s, some examples of convictions for obstructing an official proceeding included an associate of the Colombo crime family who obstructed a grand jury investigation, a teacher who tipped off drug dealers that they were under investigation using information from a relative who was a detective, and a former tour bus company executive who concealed and instructed subordinates to destroy documents sought in a federal antitrust investigation.

In 2019, Roger Stone was convicted of obstructing an official proceeding as part of the Mueller Special Counsel investigation, for lying to the U.S. House Committee on Intelligence and encouraging another witness to lie for him. Stone was later pardoned by President Donald Trump.

Obstructing an official proceeding was one of the charges in United States v. Joseph, a 2019 case where a Massachusetts state court judge and court officer helped a state court defendant evade a U.S. Immigration and Customs Enforcement agent by allowing the defendant to leave a court hearing through a rear door of the courthouse. In September 2022, the charge was dismissed as part of an agreement requiring Joseph to self-refer to the Massachusetts Commission on Judicial Conduct for possible disciplinary action.

== Prosecution of attempts to overturn the 2020 U.S. presidential election ==
=== January 6 U.S. Capitol attack ===
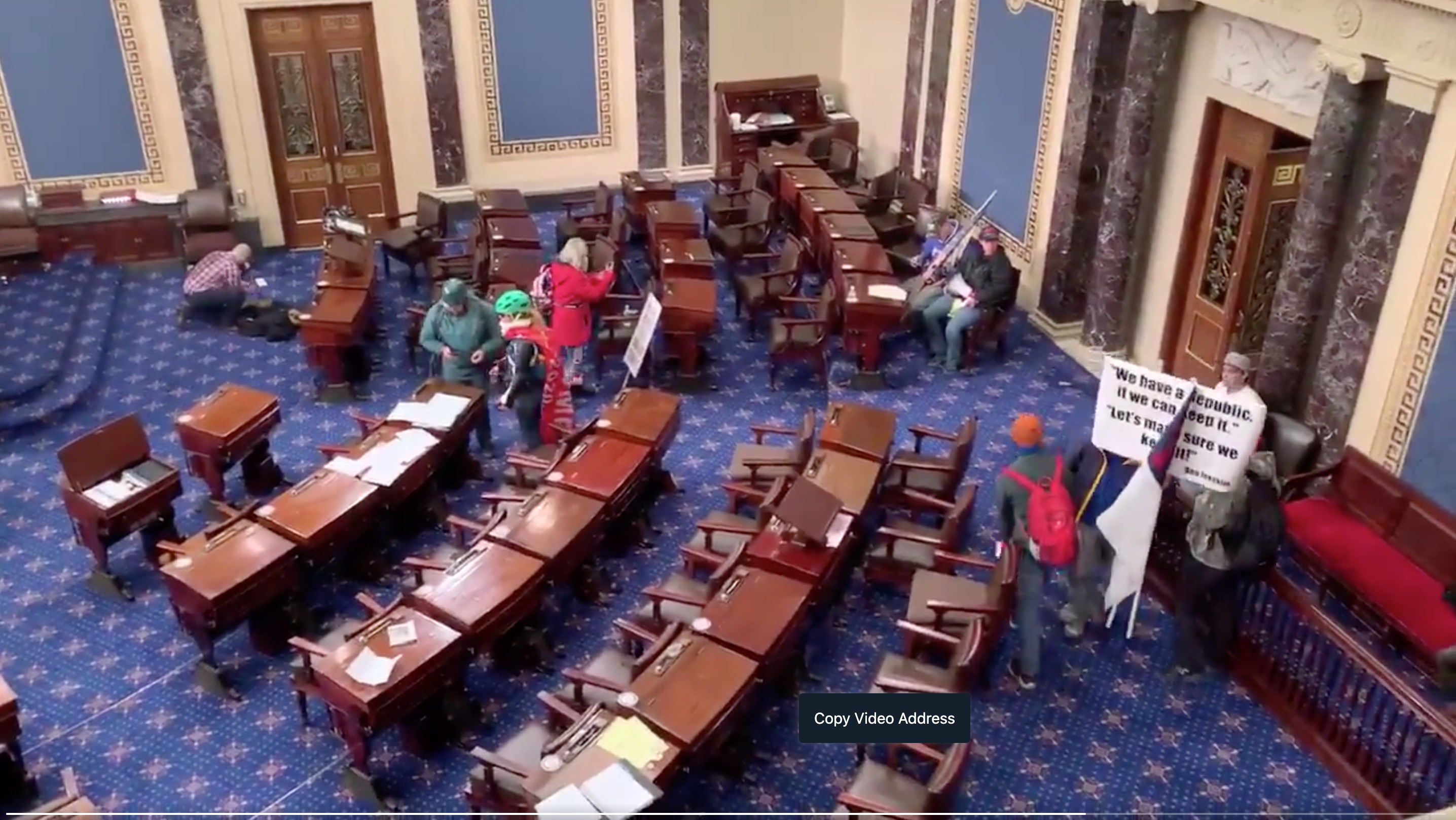
Rioters who entered the Senate chamber were among those more likely to be charged with obstructing an official proceeding, a felony, unlike others who were charged only with misdemeanors.

As of December 2022, about 290 out of over 910 defendants associated with the January 6 United States Capitol attack had been charged with obstructing an official proceeding, with over 70 convicted. It tended to be used with defendants who had entered the Senate chamber or the offices of Congress members, or members of groups such as the Oath Keepers, Proud Boys, and Three Percenters who were alleged to have prepared for violence in advance. Those who entered other areas of the Capitol were typically charged only with misdemeanors such as entering a restricted federal building, or parading, demonstrating, or picketing in the Capitol. For those charged with a felony, prosecutors preferred an obstructing an official proceeding charge in most cases, rather than insurrection or seditious conspiracy charges which are harder to prove and were considered to have more potential to be politically incendiary.

Those who have pleaded guilty to obstructing an official proceeding include "QAnon Shaman" Jacob Chansley, Olympic medalist Klete Keller, musician Jon Schaffer, Proud Boys member Nicholas Ochs, and Ronald Sandlin.

Several members of militant groups have been convicted of the charge. On March 8, 2022, in the first criminal trial of a Capitol attack defendant, Three Percenters member Guy Reffitt became the first to be convicted of obstructing an official proceeding, along with other charges. In November 2022, Stewart Rhodes, Kelly Meggs, and three other members of the Oath Keepers were convicted, and four additional Oath Keepers members including Roberto Minuta were convicted in January 2023. In May 2023, Proud Boys members Enrique Tarrio, Ethan Nordean, Joe Biggs, and Zachary Rehl were convicted.

A number of other defendants have been convicted who are notable for various reasons. Kevin Seefried, who was photographed brandishing a Confederate flag and threatening police officer Eugene Goodman, was convicted in 2022. In 2023, Richard Barnett was convicted, who had been prominently photographed in Speaker Nancy Pelosi's office during the attack, as was Kevin James Lyons, who had stolen a wallet and photograph of John Lewis from Pelosi's office. Ryan Samsel, the first to breach the restricted perimeter outside the Capitol, was convicted in 2024.

West Virginia House of Delegates member Derrick Evans was charged with obstructing an official proceeding, but the charge was dropped in a plea deal in which he instead pleaded guilty to a felony civil disorder charge.

In September 2022, Tristan Chandler and David Mehaffie became the first January 6 defendants to be acquitted of an obstructing an official proceeding charge, although they were convicted on other charges. In January 2024, Joshua Black became the first defendant who had entered the Senate chamber to be acquitted, although he too was convicted on other charges. Both acquittals were because prosecutors had not sufficiently proven their intent.

=== Election obstruction conspiracy ===
In March 2022, in Eastman v. Thompson, a civil case regarding the House Select Committee on the January 6 Attack's subpoena of John Eastman's emails, Judge David O. Carter of the District Court for the Central District of California ruled that there was a preponderance of then evidence that Trump had conspired to obstruct the January 6 joint session of Congress. This is a lower burden of proof than the beyond reasonable doubt burden required for a criminal conviction.

On August 1, 2023, two counts in the four-count indictment Donald Trump was charged with by a grand jury following the Smith special counsel investigation were for obstructing an official proceeding and conspiracy to obstruct an official proceeding for his conduct following the 2020 presidential election through the January 6 Capitol attack.

=== Applicability dispute ===
Some January 6 attack defendants argued that, given the circumstances of its passage, the law should apply only to proceedings involving the administration of justice where evidence is being presented, and not the Electoral College vote count as an administrative and ceremonial event. Although two federal judges of the District Court for the District of Columbia initially expressed concerns in court about the law's use, by March 2022, they and eight other federal judges had rejected challenges to the obstruction charge, finding that the law had been properly invoked and was not unconstitutionally vague.

==== Fischer v. United States ====
However, on March 7, Carl J. Nichols became the first federal judge to rule that the law was not applicable to the Capitol attack, on the basis that the word "otherwise" in the statute required that the conduct must involve "some action with respect to a document, record, or other object". At least two other district court judges subsequently criticized Nichols' reading of the statute in their own rulings.

In August 2022, Nichols' rulings on three such defendants was appealed to the Court of Appeals for the District of Columbia Circuit as United States v. Fischer. The hearing occurred on December 12, 2022. On April 8, 2023, the court issued its ruling. While it held that obstruction did not have to pertain to a document, it noted that the requirement of "corrupt intent" required prosecutors to differentiate defendants' conduct from protected protest or lobbying activities. The ruling permitted the three challenged cases to continue on the basis that, as they were also charged with assaulting police, there was no question that they had acted with corrupt intent.

The majority opinion, written by Judge Florence Pan, stated that a ruling on the meaning of "corrupt intent" should wait for another appropriate case to reach the court, but a concurring opinion by Judge Justin Walker explicitly adopted a narrower definition that "a defendant must intend to obtain a benefit that he knows is unlawful". It was not immediately clear which ruling was binding, due to a dispute between the two justices on whether Marks v. United States applied to the case. While the ruling reversed Nichols' rulings, it was seen as potentially opening an avenue for those not charged with assaulting police to overturn an obstruction charge. Judge Gregory Katsas wrote a dissenting opinion in which he said the pertinent part of the statute is limited to acts that “hinder the flow of truthful evidence to a proceeding.”

In December 2023, the Supreme Court agreed to hear one of the three cases as Fischer v. United States. In June 2024, it ruled in favor of Fischer that the charge only applied when "the defendant impaired the availability or integrity... of records, documents, objects, or other things used in an official proceeding, or attempted to do so." This had the effect of setting a higher bar for conviction than had actually been used in trials to that point, and was expected to lead to dismissal of the charge or overturning of convictions in cases where this requirement had not been met.

==== Other appeals ====
A different appeal to the D.C. circuit court, Robertson v. United States, was heard in May 2023. That October, the court upheld Robertson's conviction.

Another appeal, United States v. Brock, ruled in March 2024 that a sentencing penalty for substantial interference with the administration of justice did not apply to the conduct during the January 6 attack. The ruling raised the possibility that more than 100 people already convicted would have to be resentenced.

== See also ==
- Contempt of Congress
- Obstruction of justice
