= Tarek Elsetouhi =

Egyptian bodybuilder

- professional bodybuilder

Personal info
- Born: February 2, 1977 (age 48); Egypt

Best statistics
- Height: 5 ft 10 in (178 cm)
- Weight: 243 lb (110 kg)

Tarek Elsetouhi (born February 2, 1977, in Egypt) is an IFBB Pro Bodybuilder from Egypt. He now lives in United Arab Emirates, and competes internationally. He is known as a bodybuilding model and has appeared several times on MuscleGallery. As of 2008 he qualified and received his IFBB Pro Card.

== Stats ==
Age : 42

Height : 5'10"

Off Season Weight : 330

Competition Weight : 290 lbs.

== Contest results ==
IFBB Amateur Contests

- 1994 Juniors World Championship in Izmir, 80 kg, 5th place
- 1996 Juniors World Championship in Kattowitz/Polen, 80 kg, 2nd place
- 1997 Arab Bodybuilding Championship, Junior Class, 80 kg, 1st Place
- 1997 Mediterranean Championship, 90 kg, 5th Place
- 1998 Mediterranean Championship, 90 kg+, 6th Place
- 1999 Int. African Bodybuilding Championship, Heavyweight Class, 1st Place
- 2000 Int. German Championship in Koblenz, 90 kg+, 5th Place
- 2002 World Championship in Cairo, 90 kg+, 11th Place
- 2003 Mediterranean Championship in Egypt, Heavyweight over 90 kg, 1st Place
- 2003 Int. German Championship, 90 kg+, 1st Place and Overall Winner
- 2004 Guestposer at the Bavarian Championships
- 2004 Overall winner at the Championships of Hessen and Rheinland-Pfalz – 1st Place
- 2004 Winner at the 2nd International Heavy Weight Cup – 1st Place
- 2004 International Amateur Grand Prix in Butzbach/Germany, Overall Winner – 1st Place
- 2004 EM-Qualifikation for Budapest in Butzbach/Germany, Winner
- 2004 European Championships, Heavyweight – 5th Place
- 2005 BodyXTreme Invitational – 1st Place and Overall Winner
- 2005 IFBB Int. German Championship, 90 kg+, 1st Place + Overall Winner
- 2008 IFBB Arnold Classic-Amateur, Super Heavyweight – 1st Place + Overall Winner

IFBB Professional Contests

- 2008 IFBB New York Men's Pro, Super Heavyweight – 12th Place
- 2008 IFBB Europa Super Show, Super Heavyweight – 5th Place
- 2008 IFBB Tampa Pro, Super Heavyweight – 6th Place
- 2008 IFBB Atlantic City Men's Pro, Super Heavyweight 10th Place
- 2009 IFBB New York Men's Pro, Super Heavyweight – 6th Place
- 2009 IFBB Tampa Pro, Super Heavyweight – 6th Place
- 2009 IFBB Europa Super Show Pro, Super Heavyweight – 8th Place
