= Tariq Khan =

Tariq Khan or Tarik Khan may refer to:

- Tarik Khan, American politician
- Tariq Khan (actor, born 1951), Indian actor
- Tariq Khan (producer) (born 1981), Indian actor and producer
- Tariq Khan (general), Pakistan Army general
- Tariq Khan (Guantanamo detainee), Pakistani held first by an Afghan warlord and then in Guantanamo Bay
- Tariq Azim Khan, Pakistani politician
- Mir Tariq Ali Khan Talpur, Pakistani politician
- Tariq Kamal Khan (born 1930), Pakistani military official
- Tariq Pervez Khan (1948–2020), Chief Justice of the Peshawar High Court, Pakistan
- Tariq Umar Khan (born 1976), Indian production designer, art director, and film director
- Tariq Anam Khan (born 1953), Bangladeshi actor, director, writer and producer
