= Recess Therapy =

Web series and Instagram account

- Genre: Interview; Comedy
- Created by: Julian Shapiro-Barnum
- Presented by: Julian Shapiro-Barnum
- Original language: English

Production
- Camera setup: Julia Ty Goldberg; Charlotte Weinman

Original release
- Release: 2021 – present

Recess Therapy is a web series produced by Doing Things Media in which host and creator Julian Shapiro-Barnum interviews children between the ages of two and nine years old playing outside in New York City. The interviews have been uploaded on YouTube and Instagram since 2021.

== Background ==
The reason it’s called "Recess Therapy" is that the original idea was that I was going to bring things that I was struggling with to children and, like, get advice from them.

— Julian Shapiro-Barnum, in The New York Times

Shapiro-Barnum grew up in three households in Brooklyn, raised by five gay parents: two fathers and three mothers. His parents jokingly called him the "Mayor of Everywhere" in reference to his outgoing nature and desire to talk to people. He began taking an improv class in third grade, beginning a string of formal acting activity that would continue through his graduation from Boston University in 2021 with a BFA in acting.

After a 2020 study abroad program in Madrid was cut short due to the COVID-19 pandemic, Shapiro-Barnum returned to Brooklyn where he became involved in the Black Lives Matter protests in New York City. He filmed a scripted talk show called The Social Distance with his fathers through The Tank, followed by an unscripted show titled How Are You Doing Right Now? in which he interviewed strangers on the sidewalk, and a similar show called I'm Interested in which he played truth or dare with strangers.

In 2021, while editing dog videos for online production company Doing Things Media, Shapiro-Barnum decided to begin a project focused on children's ability to remain positive during the pandemic. He successfully pitched the idea to management, and the media company provided him with a producer, editor and platform for what would become Recess Therapy. The project began as part of his senior project at Boston University.

== Format ==
Recess Therapy is a web series with short video clips published on Instagram and TikTok, linked to the full interviews which are made available on YouTube. Interview topics vary and have included climate change, the economy, and "peeing your pants." He was inspired how “kids in the playground remained joyous despite the pandemic’s perturbations.” In an interview with The New York Times, Shapiro-Barnum said, “The reason it’s called Recess Therapy is that the original idea was that I was going to bring things that I was struggling with to children and, like, get advice from them.”

== Production ==
Production shoots for Recess Therapy usually take about four and a half hours, yielding an average of fifteen interviews. Filming is done by Julia Ty Goldberg and Charlotte Weinman, former college classmates of Shapiro-Barnum.

== Reception ==
At the start of 2022, the series was featured on Today as a "Fave Follow". In February 2022, a segment on ABC News described it as a "popular digital series warming the hearts of millions". However, in an interview with The New York Times two weeks later, Shapiro-Barnum shared that an episode focused on LGBT pride led to the loss of approximately 60,000 followers in the days that followed.

In August 2022, a video featuring a boy describing corn as "a big lump with knobs" was remixed by The Gregory Brothers; "It's Corn" quickly gained attention on TikTok later that month.

Recess Therapy surpassed 2.4 million social media followers in September 2022.

In December 2022, Shapiro-Barnum received the Family Entertainment Safe Streaming Hero Award at Variety's inaugural Family Entertainment Awards Dinner.

== See also ==
- Kids Say the Darndest Things
- Kids React
- It's Corn
