= Sophia Z. Lee =

American legal historian and academic administrator

Sophia Z. Lee is an American legal historian and academic administrator serving as the dean of the University of Pennsylvania Law School since 2023.

== Life ==
Lee earned a B.A. (1994) and M.S.W. (1999) from the University of California, Berkeley. From 2000 to 2001, she was a research associate at the Vera Institute of Justice. She earned a J.D. (2006) and Ph.D. (2010) in history at Yale University. She served as the editor in chief and managing editor of the Yale Journal of Law & the Humanities. Her dissertation was titled, "Almost Revolutionary": The Constitution's Strange Career in the Workplace, 1935-1980. From 2008 to 2009, she was a law clerk for U.S. district court judge Kimba Wood.

Lee joined the faculty at the University of Pennsylvania Law School as an assistant professor of law from 2009 to 2013, and professor of law and history starting in 2014. On July 1, 2023, she became the dean and Bernard G. Segal Professor of Law, succeeding Theodore Ruger. She is the school's first female dean.

== Selected works ==
- Lee, Sophia Z. (2014). The Workplace Constitution from the New Deal to the New Right. Cambridge University Press. ISBN 978-1-316-06119-0.
