= Tarık Akıltopu =

Turkish architect

Tarik Akıltopu (born 18 March 1918 in Antalya; died 2004) was Antalya's first architect of the 20th century. He was also a poet and a writer and known as an "Antalya lover". He wrote many books and poems about the city and its history. He died in February 2004 from a heart attack.
