= It's Corn =

Song and internet phenomenon

Single by the Gregory Brothers, Tariq, and Recess Therapy
- Released: August 28, 2022
- Genre: Pop
- Length: 2:47
- Label: Gregory Residence
- Songwriters: Tariq and Ediz Yilmaz
- Producer: Michael Gregory

Music video
- "It's Corn" - Songify This ft. Tariq and Recess Therapy on YouTube

"It's Corn" is a song by The Gregory Brothers. The song remixes portions of an August 2022 interview of a seven-year-old named Tariq with Julian Shapiro-Barnum on Recess Therapy. The song was released in August 28, 2022, on YouTube and went viral on social media platforms. After the interview, Tariq was nicknamed the "Corn Kid".

On September 4, 2022, Kevin Bacon covered the song and posted it on Instagram. His cover was called "a soulful acoustic rendition" on Billboard. Later that month, Tariq attended the premiere of the 2022 film Pinocchio and appeared on The Drew Barrymore Show as well as in an advertisement for Chipotle Mexican Grill. Kristi Noem, the governor of South Dakota, declared September 3 "Official Corn-bassador Tariq Day".
