= Vox populi =

Latin phrase meaning "voice of the people"

Vox populi (/ˌvɒks ˈpɒpjʊli, -laɪ/ VOKS POP-yuu-lee, -lye) is a Latin phrase (originally Vox populi, vox Dei – "The voice of the people is the voice of God"; Latin: [ˈwɔks ˈpɔ.pʊ.lɪ ˈwɔks ˈdɛj]) that literally means "voice of the people." It is used in English in the meaning "the opinion of the majority of the people." In journalism, vox pop or man on the street refers to short interviews with members of the public.

== Man on the street ==
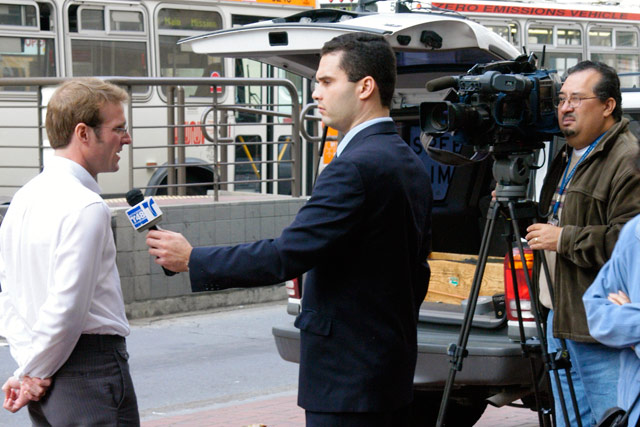
A vox pop interview

American television personality Steve Allen as the host of The Tonight Show further developed the "man on the street" interviews and audience-participation comedy breaks that have become commonplace on late-night TV. Usually the interviewees are shown in public places, and supposed to be giving spontaneous opinions in a chance encounter – unrehearsed persons, not selected in any way. As such, journalists almost always refer to them as the abbreviated vox pop. In U.S. broadcast journalism, it is often referred to as a man on the street interview or MOTS.

The results of such an interview are unpredictable at best, and therefore vox pop material is usually edited down very tightly. This presents difficulties of balance, in that the selection used ought to be, from the point of view of journalistic standards, a fair cross-section of opinions.

Although the two can be quite often confused, a vox pop is not a form of a survey. Each person is asked the same question; the aim is to get a variety of answers and opinions on any given subject. Journalists are usually instructed to approach a wide range of people to get varied answers from different points of view. The interviewees should be of various ages, sexes, classes and communities so that the diverse views and reactions of the general people will be known.

Generally, the vox pop question will be asked of different persons in different parts of streets or public places. But as an exception, in any specific topic or situation which is not concerned to general people, the question can be asked only in a specific group to know what the perception/reaction is of that group to the specific topic or issue; e.g., a question can be asked to a group of students about the quality of their education.

With increasing public familiarity with the term, several radio and television programs have been named "vox pop" in allusion to this practice.

== Vox populi, vox Dei ==
The Latin phrase Vox populi, vox dei (/ˌvɒks ˈpɒpjuːli ˌvɒks ˈdeɪi/; Latin: [ˈwoːks ˈpɔ.pʊ.liː ˈwoːks ˈde.iː] or [ˈvɔks ˈpɔː.pu.li ˈvɔks ˈdɛː.i]), 'The voice of the people [is] the voice of God', is an old proverb.

An early reference to the expression is in a letter from Alcuin of York to Charlemagne in AD 798. The full quotation from Alcuin reads:

Nec audiendi qui solent dicere, Vox populi, vox Dei, quum tumultuositas vulgi semper insaniae proxima sit.

Translation:

And those people should not be listened to who keep saying the voice of the people is the voice of God, since the riotousness of the crowd is always very close to madness.

Writing in the early 12th century, William of Malmesbury refers to the saying as a "proverb".

Of those who promoted the phrase and the idea, Archbishop of Canterbury Walter Reynolds brought charges against King Edward II in 1327 in a sermon "Vox populi, vox Dei". John Locke in his Of the Conduct of the Understanding (1706) criticises the phrase, writing "I don’t remember God delivering his oracles by the multitude, or nature delivering truths by the herd!".

== Cultural references ==
- "Vox Populi Sphere" is an online magazine of poetry, politics and nature published by the poet and activist Michael Simms.
- "Vox Populi" is a paper by Sir Francis Galton, first published in the 7 March 1907 issue of Nature, that demonstrates the "wisdom of the crowd" by a statistical analysis of the guesses from a weight-judging contest.
- A variant was used in the 1920 United States presidential election, in which the main candidates were Warren G. Harding and James M. Cox: "Cox or Harding, Harding or Cox? / You tell us, populi, you got the vox."
- In Dropout's actual play Dungeons & Dragons show Dimension 20: The Unsleeping City, Kingston Brown holds the title of "Vox Populi of New York City", the individual selected to be the voice of the people of New York, regarding matters involving magical forces from the Dream Realm.
- After his acquisition of Twitter, Elon Musk conducted a poll asking whether or not he should reinstate the account of the former President Donald Trump. Upon the results of the poll, Musk tweeted "The people have spoken. Trump will be reinstated. Vox Populi, Vox Dei." This poll stated "Reinstate former President Trump" and after 15,085,458 votes, resulted in 51.8% voting "Yes." Musk used the phrase, once again, in response to a poll he posted on Twitter on November 23, 2022. That poll asked, "Should Twitter offer a general amnesty to suspended accounts, provided that they have not broken the law or engaged in egregious spam?" After being active for one day, the results were 72.4% in favor of account amnesty. 3,162,112 accounts voted. To this, Musk tweeted "The people have spoken. Amnesty begins next week. Vox Populi, Vox Dei."
- In reference to the decline of legacy media, American journalist and YouTube personality, Andrew Callaghan has criticized the overuse of Vox populi interviews by fellow online content creators, stating in a February 11, 2025 interview, "Most journalists today, it's just 'Vox Pop', and what that refers to--I read it on Wikipedia one time--it's you just get peoples' reactions to what's already happening". Callaghan points to this as a strategy used to drive online viewership through collective outrage on an issue without the burden of providing any new substantive journalistic reporting.

== See also ==
Quotations related to Vox populi at Wikiquote

- General will
- List of Latin phrases
- People
- Power to the people (slogan)
- Public opinion
- Doxa
