= Adam Christian Johnson =

American Capitol rioter

Adam Johnson
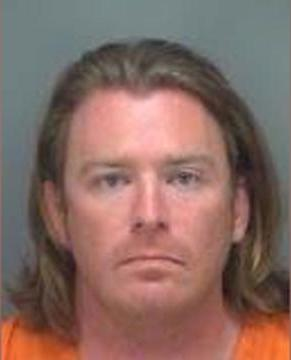
- Mug shot of Johnson, c. January 2021
- Born: Adam Christian Johnson; 1984 or 1985 (age 41–42); Millington, Tennessee, United States
- Occupations: Cook; furniture maker
- Known for: Participation in the January 6 United States Capitol attack
- Political party: Republican
- Conviction: Entering and remaining in a restricted building (18 U.S.C. § 1752)
- Penalty: 75 days imprisonment plus a $5,000 fine

Adam Christian Johnson, also known as "Podium Guy", "Lectern Guy", and "Via Getty", (born 1984 or 1985) is an American man who took part in the United States Capitol attack on January 6, 2021. A photograph of Johnson carrying then-House Speaker Nancy Pelosi's lectern became a prominent image of the attack.

On February 25, 2022, he was convicted of entering and remaining in a restricted building or grounds, and was sentenced to 75 days of incarceration with a $5,000 fine.

On January 20, 2025, the first day of the second presidency of Donald Trump, Johnson was pardoned along with nearly every other participant in the Capitol riot.

== Early life, career and politics ==
Johnson was born in Millington, Tennessee, lived most of his life in Southwest Florida and attended the University of South Florida. In his late teens and early 20s, he was arrested on two separate misdemeanor marijuana charges by Manatee County police. He violated probation in 2005 by failing to submit needed supervision reports. Johnson had listed his occupation as a cook in 2005, and had worked as a furniture maker. He was unemployed at the time of the insurrection.

At the time of the Capitol attack, he had been registered with no party affiliation since 2019, having initially registered as a Republican in Florida's voter registration database in 2002. He voted in the 2004 and 2020 general elections, but did not vote in the 2016 election. Posts on his Facebook page before the attack showed him wearing a red "Make America Great Again" hat. He had also derided the Black Lives Matter movement on social media.

== January 6 United States Capitol attack ==
Before the attack, Johnson shared on social media that he would be in Washington, D.C. On the way to the Capitol, he posted selfies on Facebook in an airport with other MAGA supporters. In a rally on the night of January 5, a Washington Post videographer captured him shouting expletives and implying that he did not believe Joe Biden was legitimately elected. Following the rally, he posted a photo of himself on Facebook with the caption, "Riot!!!"

On January 6, 2021, during the United States Capitol attack, Johnson was at the front of the riot, having sprinted from the "Stop the Steal" rally at the White House after learning of the attack. He spent 35 minutes inside the Capitol, entering three highly sensitive areas of the Capitol according to prosecutors, and was photographed jiggling the handle of Speaker of the House Nancy Pelosi's office suite. He found Pelosi's lectern near a spiral staircase and carried it to the Capitol rotunda. In the rotunda, he was photographed by a Getty Images photographer Win McNamee, wearing a Trump themed ski cap and holding the lectern in his right arm. He asked a woman to take pictures of him standing in front of the podium, then left the lectern in the middle of the room. He was then recorded telling the other rioters to use a bust of George Washington to break down the doors to the House Chamber, as well as other encouragement.

In the hours following the riot and the publishing of the photograph, Johnson was nicknamed "Podium Guy" on the internet. He wrote on social media that he "broke the internet" and that he was "finally famous".

The location of the lectern was not immediately known following the attack. The federal warrant for Johnson's arrest stated that "on or about January 7, 2021, the lectern was found by a member of the Senate staff in the Red corridor of the Senate wing off the Rotunda in the Capitol building," and that "according to the House of Representatives' curator, the Speaker's lectern has a market value of more than $1,000." The lectern would later be placed in the Capitol's Rayburn Room on January 13 for an engrossment ceremony of the House impeachment resolution.

The Federal Bureau of Investigation (FBI) searched for Johnson following the attack. He was later identified by residents of Bradenton, Florida, through the photos taken of him during the attack, and this was published in The Bradenton Herald on January 8, 2021. He was arrested on January 8 after being reported to the FBI by his acquaintance Allan Mestel, and held in Pinellas County Jail pending charges and on a warrant from the United States Marshals Service. He cooperated fully with federal agents, but had destroyed his photographs and social media accounts before his arrest.

== Trial and incarceration ==
Johnson was charged with "one count of knowingly entering or remaining in any restricted building or grounds without lawful authority; one count of theft of government property; and one count of violent entry and disorderly conduct on Capitol grounds." He was released on $25,000 bond on January 11, 2021.

Federal prosecutors initially asked for a 90-day sentence. On November 22, 2021, Johnson reached a plea agreement and pleaded guilty in federal court to entering and remaining in a restricted building or grounds, and prosecutors dismissed his charges of theft of government property and of violent entry and disorderly conduct on Capitol grounds. The plea deal also included an agreement on a potential book or "something of that nature" that would be published by Johnson, which gave the government rights to any profit that Johnson acquired as a result of that product for five years. During Johnson's trial, U.S. District Judge Reggie Walton recommended he read the books How Civil Wars Start and The Next Civil War. Johnson did not read the two books. On February 25, 2022, Johnson was sentenced to 75 days in prison with a year of supervised release and 200 hours of community service, and he was ordered to pay a $5,525 fine.

On January 20, 2025, the first day of the second presidency of Donald Trump, Johnson was pardoned along with nearly every other participant in the Capitol attack.

== Run for office ==
On January 6, 2026—the fifth anniversary of the Capitol attack—Johnson filed to run for a seat on the Manatee County Commission. His campaign logo was an outline of the photograph of him carrying Nancy Pelosi's podium. In August 2026, Johnson lost, finishing fourth among six candidates in the Republican primary.

== In popular culture ==
Actor and political artist Jim Carrey created a portrait of Johnson following the attack, entitled #fuckedforlife. John Krasinski mimicked Johnson carrying the lectern in an episode of Saturday Night Live.

== Personal life ==
Johnson was a stay-at-home father of five boys, and is married to a medical doctor, his second wife. At the time of the Capitol attack, he was 36 and lived in Manatee County, Florida. He went to a Baptist church.

== See also ==
- List of cases of the January 6 United States Capitol attack (G-L)
- Criminal proceedings in the January 6 United States Capitol attack
- List of people granted executive clemency in the second Trump presidency
- Richard Barnett (Capitol rioter)
- Kevin James Lyons
- Rachel Powell, Capitol rioter known as "Pink Hat Lady" and "Bullhorn Lady"
