= Death of an Author =

Death of an Author may refer to:

- Death of an Author (Lorac novel), a 1935 detective novel
- Death of an Author (Rhode novel), a 1947 detective novel
- "The Death of the Author", a 1967 critical essay by Roland Barthes
- Death of an Author (novella), a 2023 crime novella by Stephen Marche
- Death of the Author (novel), a 2025 Africanfuturist novel by Nnedi Okorafor
