= Wilkenfeld =

Wilkenfeld is a surname. Notable people with the surname include:

- Jonathan Wilkenfeld (born 1942), American political scientist
- Tal Wilkenfeld (born 1986), Australian singer, songwriter, bassist, and guitarist
