= Suicidal ambivalence =

Aspect of a suicidal crisis

Suicidal ambivalence is the coexistence of the will to live and the desire to die in people with suicidal tendencies.

As Craig Bryan et al. point out, one could suppose that people at high suicide risk would generally want to die. However, apart from the desire of death, they actually present the desire to continue living, which implies that they are ambivalent to the matter of life and death. Kovacs & Beck in 1977 described this idea as the internal struggle hypothesis. They corroborated it by research in which half of patients hospitalized after a suicide attempt admitted to having an internal struggle between life and death: 40% of them were inclined to death and 9% expressed a will to live. Moreover, subsequent research showed that ambivalence does not disappear even in the moment of a suicide attempt.

Suicidal ambivalence is a predictor of suicidal behaviors. Suicidal risk depends on the relative balance of the will of live and wanting to die. In one study of subjects ambivalent about suicide, persons inclined towards death were 6.5 times more likely to die than those that inclined towards living. O'Connor et al. even tried to categorize people at risk due to suicidal ambivalence. Patients with a prevailing desire to die were significantly more likely to attempt suicide than were ambivalent persons or those with a prevailing will to live. The group differed also in the level of helplessness and subjectively perceived suicide risk.

In the case of someone in crisis, a full psychiatric examination is recommended with possible psychiatric hospitalization depending on suicide risk evaluation.
