= Paul Ingrassia =

Paul Ingrassia may refer to:

- Paul Ingrassia (journalist) (1950–2019), an American journalist
- Paul Ingrassia (lawyer) (born 1995), an American lawyer
