= M. P. Gupta =

Indian academic

Professor M. P. Gupta is an Indian academic. He is serving as the Chair Person of the Modi Foundation at the IIT Delhi. Gupta has provided mentorship for 30 Doctoral theses and collaborated on 22 sponsored and consultancy projects with a cumulative value exceeding 5 crores. Additionally, he has co-authored the book Government Online, as well as edited two other books titled Towards E-government and Promise of E-governance. His research contributions also include over 200 published research papers in both national and international journals and conference proceedings. Gupta has played a pivotal role in overseeing the creation of 14 edited volumes, representing a substantial body of literature on e-governance, through his involvement in the International Conference on E-governance (ICEG) since 2003. He is currently serving as Director, Indian Institute of Management, Lucknow campus.

== Awards and honours ==
- Served as Member on the Expert Committee on Prasar Bharati
- Humanities & Social Sciences (HSS) Fellowship of the Shastri Indo Canadian Institute, Calgary (Canada) in 1996.
- Best Professor Award at the Singapore World Education Congress.

== Books Authored ==
1. Government Online: Opportunities and Challenges, 2003 Tata Macgraw-Hill
2. Digital India: Reflections and Practice (Advances in Theory and Practice of Emerging Markets), Springer, 2018
3. Towards E-Government: Management Challenges, Tata Mcgraw-Hill, 2004
