= Susan Strange Award =

The Susan Strange Award, named after the political theorist Susan Strange, was established in 1998 to reward innovative thinkers in the field of international studies.

== Recipients ==
- Rudolph Rummel (1999) - the first recipient of the Susan Strange Award
- Steve Smith (2000)
- Robert W. Cox (2001)
- Steve Brams (2002)
- J. David Singer (2003)
- Ken Booth (2004)
- Frank C. Zagare (2005)
- George Modelski (2006)
- Cynthia Enloe (2007)
- Hayward Alker (2008)
- John Mueller (2009)
- Richard Falk (2010)
- Peter J. Katzenstein (2011)
- Robert O. Keohane (2012)
- Kathryn Sikkink (2013)
- Dina Zinnes (2014)
- Andrew Hurrell (2015)
- Bruce Bueno de Mesquita (2016)
- Scott Sagan (2017)
- J. Ann Tickner (2018)
- Jonathan Wilkenfeld (2019)
- Laura Sjoberg (2020)
- Barbara Walter (2021)
- R. Harrison Wagner (2022)

== See also ==
- International Studies Association
