= Shastri Indo-Canadian Institute =

Canadian-Indian organization and charity

- Abbreviation: SICI
- Formation: 1968; 58 years ago
- Headquarters: 2500 University Drive N.W. & 5 Bhai Vir Singh Marg
- Location(s): Calgary, Alberta and New Delhi, India
- President: Dr. B. Hariharan
- Website: www.shastriinstitute.org

The Shastri Indo-Canadian Institute is a binational non-profit organization with registered charity status in Canada. The institute supports the creation of binational links between academia, government, the business community and civil society organizations by funding research and hosting seminars. It provides grants as well as internships and fellowships to provide opportunities for individuals to gain first-hand experience in India or Canada in their field of expertise. Furthermore, the Institute serves as a liaison between educational institutions and the Indian diaspora in Canada. Dr. B. Hariharan, Professor and Head, Institute of English, for the University of Kerala, is the president of the organization.

== History ==
Named after former Prime Minister of India, Lal Bahadur Shastri, the Shastri Indo-Canadian Institute was created in 1968 through a joint announcement of the governments of Canada and India. The idea of forming an institute to promote scholarly activity between Canada and India was first conceived by Dr. Michael Brecher, a political science professor at McGill University, when he met Prime Minister Shastri who gave the convocation address at McGill University in June 1965. In his address, the Prime Minister suggested that there needed to be institutional understanding to promote scholarly exchange in the field of humanities and social sciences.

The initial purpose of the institute was to encourage Canadian educational institutions to focus university level teaching and research on India. With an emphasis on the humanities and social sciences, the Shastri Institute's programmes funded fellowships and distributed Indian books and journals to the libraries of the four founding Canadian member institutions.

== Operations ==
=== Funding ===
The institute's main sources of funding come from the Canadian and India governments, chiefly through the Canadian International Development Agency (CIDA) and the Department of Foreign Affairs and International Trade (DFAIT) on the Canadian side and from the Ministry of Human Resource Development (India) from the Government of India. It also receives contributions from Canadian member institutions as well as private donations.

=== Governance ===
An eight-member bi-national Executive Council, which is elected by representatives of the member institutions, governs the Shastri Institute. The presidency of the Executive Council alternates annually between Canada and India. The institute also operates with the guidance of the Indian Administrative Committee, as well as with advice from the Canadian Advisory Council and the Indian Advisory Council. In addition to the Executive Council, there are various committees within the Shastri Institute, which are filled by representatives of the member institutions. Staff members at the India and Canada offices, located in New Delhi and Calgary respectively, carry out all administrative responsibilities of the institution.

== Grants and awards ==
The institute makes a number of grants and awards.

== Member Institutions ==
The four founding members of the Shastri Institution were McGill University, the University of British Columbia, the University of Toronto and the National Library of Canada. In 1980, the University of Ottawa became the first bilingual organization to join the Shastri Institute while HEC Montreal and Université Laval became the first francophone members in 2006.

=== List of Canadian members ===
- University of Alberta
- University of Calgary
- University of British Columbia
- Carleton University
- Concordia University
- Dalhousie University
- École de technologie supérieurel
- University of Guelph
- HEC Montréal
- Université Laval
- University of Lethbridge
- University of Manitoba
- McGill University
- McMaster University
- Université de Montréal
- Mount Allison University
- University of Ottawa
- Queen's University
- University of Regina
- Saint Mary's University
- Toronto Metropolitan University
- University of Saskatchewan
- University of Toronto
- University of Victoria
- University of Waterloo
- University of Western Ontario
- Wilfrid Laurier University
- York University

=== List of Indian members ===
- University of Agricultural Science, Dharwad
- Assam University
- Banaras Hindu University
- Berhampur University
- University of Calcutta
- Central Institute of English and Foreign Languages
- University of Delhi
- Dr. Harisingh Gour University
- Goa University
- Hidayatullah National Law University
- Himachal Pradesh University
- University of Hyderabad
- Indian Council of Philosophical Research
- Indian Institute for Social and Economic Change
- Indian Institute of Advanced Study, Shimla
- Indian Institute of Management Ahmedabad
- Indian Institute of Management Bangalore
- Indian Institute of Management Calcutta
- Indian Institute of Management Indore
- Indian Institute of Management Kozhikode
- Indian Institute of Management Lucknow
- Indian Institute of Technology Bombay
- Indian Institute of Technology Kanpur
- Indian Institute of Technology Kharagpur
- Indian Institute of Technology Madras
- Indian Institute of Technology Roorkee
- Indian Institute of Technology Guwahati
- Indira Gandhi National Open University
- Jadavpur University
- University of Jammu
- Jawaharlal Nehru University
- University of Kerala
- University of Madras
- Madurai Kamaraj University
- Maharaja Sayajirao University of Baroda
- Mangalore University
- University of Mumbai
- University of Mysore
- National Academy of Legal Studies and Research University
- National Institute of Science, Technology and Development Studies
- National Institute of Technology, Tiruchirappalli
- National Institute of Technology, Jaipur
- National Law University, Jodhpur
- National Law School of Delhi
- National Museum Institute
- Osmania University
- Panjab University
- Pondicherry University
- Dr. Ram Manohar Lohia National Law University (RMLNLU)
- SNDT Women's University
- Sri Venkataswara University
- Indian Institute of Technology Jammu
