= International Crisis Behavior Project =

The International Crisis Behavior (ICB) Project is a project that collates interstate crisis data from 1918 (the end of World War I) onward to 2019. The project was created in 1975 by Michael Brecher and Jonathan Wilkenfeld.

== Data ==
The International Crisis Behavior project contains data on international crises from 1918 onward (i.e., after the end of World War I). As of March 2023, the newest available data is ICB Version 15. The data for this version extends through 2019 and includes 496 international crises and 1,100 crisis actors. All data is available freely for download.

== Reception ==
=== Academic reception ===
Data from the ICB has been referenced in a number of academic papers studying the patterns of conflicts and international crises. It was also used in Chapter 3 of the book What Do We Know About War? edited by John A. Vasquez. The Forecasting Principles website lists the ICB Project as an important data resource in the analysis of conflict and terror.
