= Barbara F. Walter =

American political scientist

- Born: Bronxville, New York, U.S.
- Education: Bucknell University (BA); University of Chicago (MA, PhD)
- Employer(s): University of California, San Diego; Columbia University; Harvard University

Barbara F. Walter is a political scientist who has researched and written about civil wars, including why they start, how they escalate, and how they can be prevented. She is the Rohr Professor of International Affairs at the University of California, San Diego and the author of How Civil Wars Start and How to Stop Them (2022).

Walter's research centers on the structural conditions that make societies vulnerable to internal conflict, with a particular focus on anocracy—the fragile, transitional space between autocracy and democracy where political instability is most acute. Her work has influenced discussions about political risk, early warning systems, and democratic resilience. She has briefed U.S. government agencies, spoken at TED2023, and advised international organizations on conflict prevention.

She is an elected member of the National Academy of Sciences and the American Academy of Arts and Sciences, and serves on the Council on Foreign Relations. She is the recipient of the Susan Strange Award from the International Studies Association and the Peacemaker of the Year Award from the National Conflict Resolution Center. In 2012, she co-founded Political Violence @ a Glance, a blog about political science research aimed at a broad public audience.

== Early life and education ==
Walter was born in Bronxville, New York, and raised in Yonkers. Her parents—immigrants from Switzerland and Germany—encouraged an early interest in politics and history. She earned a B.A. in political science and German from Bucknell University, followed by an M.A. and Ph.D. in political science from the University of Chicago. She later held postdoctoral fellowships at Harvard University's Olin Institute for Strategic Studies and Columbia University's War and Peace Institute.

== Academic career ==
Walter joined the faculty at UC San Diego in 1996. Her early work explored how civil wars end and the challenges of sustaining peace. Her book Committing to Peace: The Successful Settlement of Civil Wars (2002) studied the durability of peace agreements.

A subsequent book, Reputation and Civil War: Why Separatist Conflicts Are So Violent (2009), examined why secessionist movements are especially prone to protracted violence. Her most recent work, How Civil Wars Start (2022), explores the early warning signs of political breakdown and internal conflict.

== Public scholarship and influence ==
Walter has briefed the U.S. intelligence community and senior officials in the Departments of Defense and State and has served as an advisor to multilateral organizations focused on peace-building and governance.

Her writing has appeared in The New York Times, The Washington Post, The Wall Street Journal, The New Yorker, Foreign Affairs, Time, and The New Republic. She is a frequent commentator on CNN, MSNBC, NPR, and PBS NewsHour.

== Honors and awards ==
- Member, National Academy of Sciences
- Member, American Academy of Arts and Sciences
- Member, Council on Foreign Relations
- Susan Strange Award, International Studies Association (2021)
- Peacemaker of the Year Award, National Conflict Resolution Center (2022)
- TED Speaker, TED2023 (Vancouver)
- Speaker, Aspen Ideas Festival (2022)

== Selected publications ==
- How Civil Wars Start: And How to Stop Them (2022)
- Reputation and Civil War: Why Separatist Conflicts Are So Violent (2009)
- Committing to Peace: The Successful Settlement of Civil Wars (2002)
