= Crisis =

Any event causing instability and danger

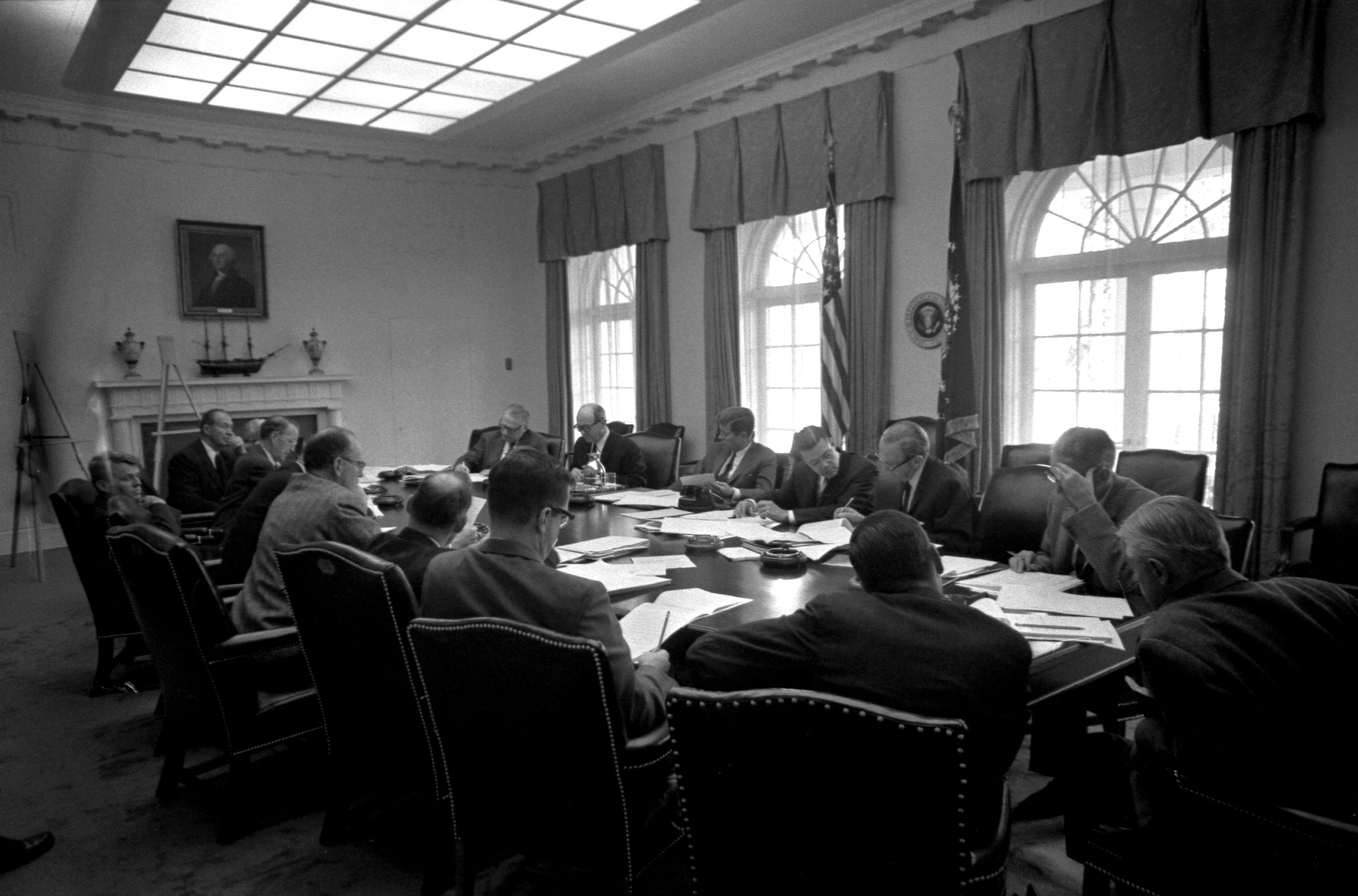
An EXCOMM meeting during the Cuban Missile Crisis, a crisis between the United States and Soviet Union over ballistic missiles in Cuba

A crisis (pl.: crises; adj: critical) is any event or period that will lead to an unstable and dangerous situation affecting an individual, group, or all of society. Crises are negative changes in the human or environmental affairs, especially when they occur abruptly, with little or no warning. More loosely, a crisis is a testing time for an emergency.

== Etymology ==
The English word crisis was borrowed from the Latin, which in turn was borrowed from the Greek κρίσις krisis 'discrimination, decision, crisis'. The noun is derived from the verb κρίνω krinō, which means 'distinguish, choose, decide'.

In English, crisis was first used in a medical context, for the time in the development of a disease when a change indicates either recovery or death, that is, a turning-point. It was also used for a major change in the development of a disease. By the mid-seventeenth century, it took on the figurative meaning of a "vitally important or decisive stage in the progress of anything", especially a period of uncertainty or difficulty, without necessarily having the implication of a decision-point.

== Definition ==
The definition of a crisis is scientifically contested. A crisis is often linked to the concept of psychological stress and used to suggest a frightening or fraught experience. In the crisis-as-event model, "crisis" is the situation of a "complex system" when the system functions poorly (the system still functions, but does not break down), an immediate decision is necessary to stop the further disintegration of the system, but the causes of the dysfunction are not immediately identified (the causes are so numerous or unknown that it seems impossible to take a rational, informed decision to reverse the situation). By "complex system" we mean something like a family, economy, or society; simple systems do not enter crises. We can speak about a crisis of moral values, an economical or political crisis, but not a motor crisis.

The crisis has several defining characteristics. Seeger, Sellnow, and Ulmer say that crises have four defining characteristics that are "specific, unexpected, and non-routine events or series of events that [create] high levels of uncertainty and threat or perceived threat to an organization's high priority goals." Thus the first three characteristics are that the event is

1. unexpected (i.e., a surprise)
2. creates uncertainty
3. is seen as a threat to important goals

Venette argues that "crisis is a process of transformation where the old system can no longer be maintained." Therefore the fourth defining quality is the need for change. If change is not needed, the event could more accurately be described as a failure.

Apart from natural crises that are inherently unpredictable (volcanic eruptions, tsunamis, etc.) most of the crises that we face are created by man. Hence the requirements of their being 'unexpected' depend upon man failing to note the onset of crisis conditions. Some of our inability to recognize crises before they become dangerous is due to denial and other psychological responses that provide succor and protection for our emotions.

A different set of reasons for failing to notice the onset of crises is that we allow ourselves to be 'tricked' into believing that we are doing something for reasons that are false. In other words, we are doing the wrong things for the right reasons. For example, we might believe that we are solving the threats of climate change by engaging in economic trading activity that has no real impact on the climate. Mitroff and Silvers posit two reasons for these mistakes, which they classify as Type 3 (inadvertent) and Type 4 (deliberate) errors.

The effect of our inability to attend to the likely results of our actions can result in a crisis.

From this perspective, we might usefully learn that failing to understand the real causes of our difficulties is likely to lead to repeated downstream 'blowback'. Where states are concerned, Michael Brecher, based on case studies of the International Crisis Behavior (ICB) project, suggested a different way of defining crisis as conditions are perceptions held by the highest level decision-makers of the actor concerned: 1. threat to basic values, with a simultaneous or subsequent 2. high probability of involvement in military hostilities, and the awareness of 3. finite time for response to the external value threat.

Spector argues on the other hand, that there is disagreement on which events do an do not constitute a crisis. In the crisis-as-claim model leaders are not reacting to a crisis, but it positions them as the makers of a claim, which must be critically evaluated. Best argues that the claim of a crisis and the associated implication of urgency is made by leaders which are politically motivated to further a goal. Wagner‐Pacifici argues that a crisis is not a naturally occurring thing, but instead a human imposition with boundaries chosen by people.

=== Chinese word for "crisis" ===
It is frequently said in Western motivational speaking that the Chinese word for "crisis" is composed of two Chinese characters signifying "danger" and "opportunity" respectively. This is, however, considered by linguists to be a misperception.

== Economic ==
An economic crisis is a sharp transition to a recession. See for example 1994 economic crisis in Mexico, Argentine economic crisis (1999–2002), South American economic crisis of 2002, Economic crisis of Cameroon. Crisis theory is a central achievement in the conclusions of Karl Marx's critique of Capital.

A financial crisis may be a banking crisis or currency crisis.

== Environmental ==
Crises pertaining to the environment include:

=== Environmental disaster ===
An environmental disaster is a disaster that is due to human activity and should not be confused with natural disasters (see below). In this case, the impact of humans' alteration of the ecosystem has led to widespread and/or long-lasting consequences. It can include the deaths of animals (including humans) and plant systems, or severe disruption of human life, possibly requiring migration.

=== Natural disaster ===
A natural disaster is the consequence of a natural hazard (e.g. volcanic eruption, earthquake, landslide) which moves from potential in to an active phase, and as a result affects human activities. Human vulnerability, exacerbated by the lack of planning or lack of appropriate emergency management, leads to financial, structural, and human losses. The resulting loss depends on the capacity of the population to support or resist the disaster, their resilience. This understanding is concentrated in the formulation: "disasters occur when hazards meet vulnerability". Thus a natural hazard will never result in a natural disaster in an invulnerable area: a strong earthquake in an uninhabited area is not a disaster.

For lists of natural disasters, see the list of disasters or the list of deadliest natural disasters.

=== Endangered species ===
An endangered species is a population of an organism which is at risk of becoming extinct because it is either few in number, or threatened by changing environmental or predation parameters. An endangered species is usually a taxonomic species, but may be another evolutionary significant unit. The World Conservation Union (IUCN) has classified 38 percent of the 44,837 species assessed by 2008 as threatened.

== International ==
For information about crises in the field of study in international relations, see crisis management and international crisis. In this context, a crisis can be loosely defined as a situation where there is a perception of threat, heightened anxiety, expectation of possible violence and the belief that any actions will have far-reaching consequences (Lebow, 7–10).

== Personal ==
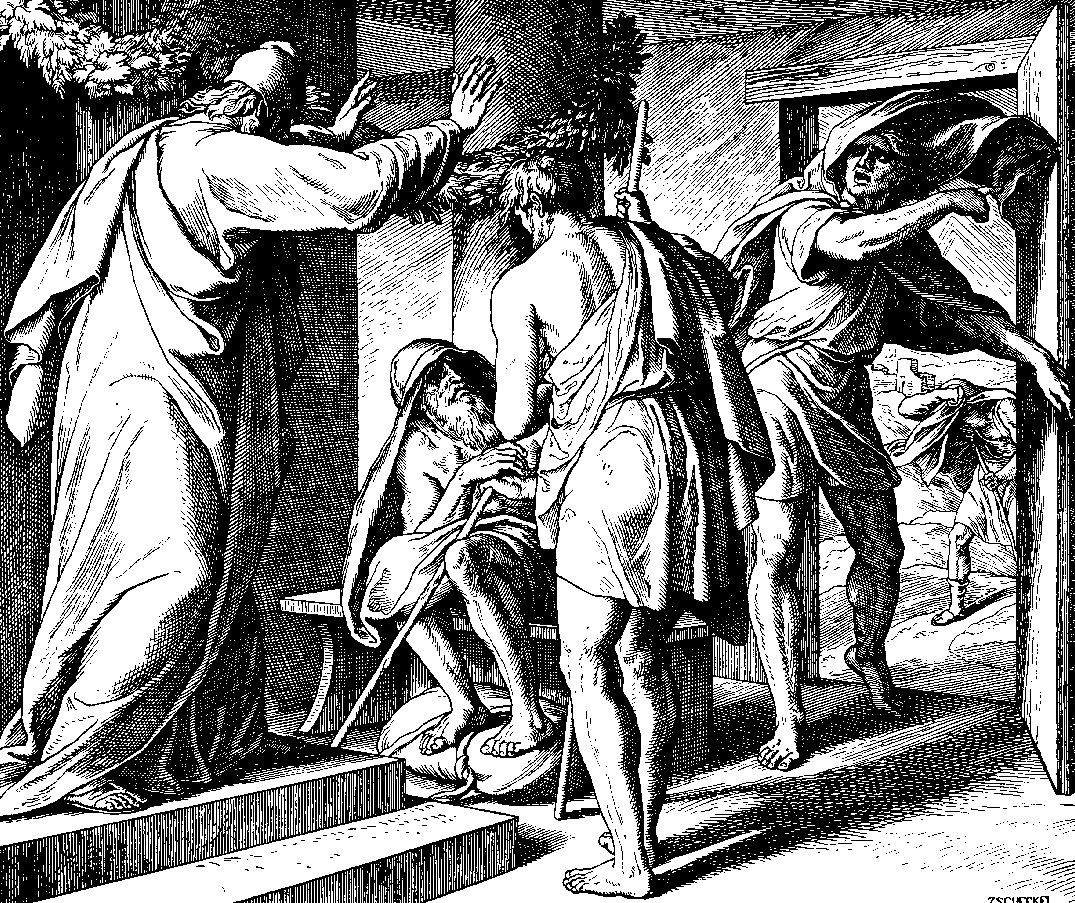
Messengers going to Job, each with bad news, 1860 woodcut by Julius Schnorr von Karolsfeld

A personal crisis occurs when an individual can no longer cope with a situation. This is preceded by events of an extraordinary nature triggering extreme tension and stress within an individual, i.e., the crisis, which then requires major decisions or actions to resolve. Crises can be triggered by a wide range of situations including, but not limited to, extreme weather conditions, sudden change in employment/financial state, medical emergencies, long-term illness, and social or familial turmoil. Crises are simply a change in the events that comprise the day-to-day life of a person and those in their close circle, such as the loss of a job, extreme financial hardship, substance addiction/abuse, and other situations that are life-altering and require action that is outside the "normal" daily routine. A person going through a crisis experiences a state of mental disequilibrium, in which the ego struggles to balance both internal and external demands. In this case, said person resorts to coping mechanisms to deal with the stress. Various coping mechanisms include:

- High emotions (crying, physical withdrawal)
- Defense mechanisms (denial, repression)
- Making rash decisions
- Acting out
- Putting things on hold

In some cases, it is difficult for an individual undergoing a crisis to adapt to the situation. As it is outside of their normal range of functioning, it is common that one endures a struggle to control emotions. This lack of control can lead to suicidal tendencies, substance abuse, trouble with the law and general avoidance of resources available for help. One such resource used to aid an individual in crisis is their social support system, which can come in the form of family, friends, coworkers, or health professionals. It is important that a support system consists of people that the individual trusts. Although these support systems play a crucial role in aiding an individual through a crisis, they are also the underlying cause of two thirds of mental health crises. The aforementioned mental health crises can include marital issues, abandonment, parental conflict and family struggles.

In order to aid someone in a crisis, it is crucial to be able to identify the signs that indicate they are undergoing an internal conflict. These signs, as well as the aforementioned coping mechanisms, include:

- Irrational and/or narrow thinking
- Lowered attention span
- Unclear motives
- Disorganized approach to problem-solving
- Resistance to communication
- Inability to differentiate between large and small issues
- Change/alteration to social networks

=== Ways to manage a crisis ===
As aforementioned, a crisis to this day can be overcome by implementing mechanisms such as: sleep, rejection, physical exercise, meditation and thinking. To assist individuals in regaining emotional equilibrium, intervention can be used. The overall goal of crisis intervention is to get the individual back to a pre-crisis level of functioning or higher with the help of a social support group. As said by Judith Swan, there's a strong correlation between the client's emotional balance and the trust in their support system in helping them throughout their crisis. The steps of crisis intervention are: to assess the situation based on behavior patterns of the individual, decide what type of help is needed (make a plan of action), and finally to take action/intervention, based on the individual's skills to regain equilibrium. In the context of natural disasters and other climate change-related crises, emotional activation is common. Collective processing of emotional experiences is an important part of enabling individuals to increase in their resilience, leading to greater community engagement and a sense of belongingness. When appropriate support for emotional experiences is provided, climate change-induced emotions are adaptive.

The Registered Nurses’ Association of Ontario proposed the ABC model for dealing with client's interventions in crises:

1. Basic attending skills (making the person comfortable, remaining calm, etc.)
2. Identifying the problem and therapeutic interaction (explore their perceptions, identify sources of emotional distress, identify impairments in behavioral functioning, use therapeutic interactions)
3. Coping and negotiating (identify coping attempts, present alternative coping strategies, follow up post-crisis)

=== Benefits of listening in a crisis ===
Moreover, another method for helping individuals who are suffering in a crisis is active listening; it is defined as seeing circumstances from another perspective and letting the other person know that the negotiator (the helper) understands their perspective. Through this, they establish trust and rapport by demonstrating empathy, understanding, and objectivity in a non-judgmental way. It is important for the negotiator to listen to verbal and non-verbal reactions of the person in need, in order to be able to label the emotion that the individual is showing. Thus, this demonstrates that the helper is tuned in emotionally. Furthermore, there are other techniques that can be used to demonstrate active listening such as paraphrasing, silence, and reflecting or mirroring. The goal in active listening is to keep the person talking about their situation.

== In chaos theory ==
When the control parameter of a chaotic system is modified, the chaotic attractor touches an unstable periodic orbit inside the basin of attraction inducing a sudden expansion in the attractor. This phenomenon is termed as interior crisis in a chaotic system.

== See also ==
- Chinese word for "crisis" – Linguistic misconception
- Constitutional crisis – Conflict a governing law is unable to resolve
- Coup d'état – Deposition of a government
- Crisis cafe – Form of mental health support
- Crisis management – Process by which an organization deals with a harmful emergency
- Crisis state – Unstable state on the verge of failure
- Crysis – Video game series
- Debt crisis – Situation in which a government cannot pay back its debt
- Distress signal – Internationally recognized means for obtaining help
  - Mayday – Emergency procedure word used internationally as a distress signal
  - SOS – International Morse code distress signal for help
- Ecological crisis – Change to the environment that destabilizes the continued survival of a population
- Energy crisis – Low availability of energy resources
- Existential crisis – Inner conflict due to perceived meaninglessness
- Hostage crisis – Person seized by abductor to compel action by another party
- Housing crisis – Acute failures in the housing market
- Humanitarian crisis – Large threat to the health and safety of many people
- Journal of Contingencies and Crisis Management
- Mid-life crisis – Transition of identity and self-confidence
- Migrant crisis – Situation resulting from flows of immigrants to a country
- Pensions crisis – Predicted difficulty in funding pensions
- Revolution – Rapid and fundamental political change
- Suicide crisis – Feelings of or ideation with suicide
- The Crisis of Man (Albert Camus)
- War – Intense armed conflict
- Water crisis – Situation where there is a shortage of water
