= Stephen Marche =

Canadian novelist (born 1976)

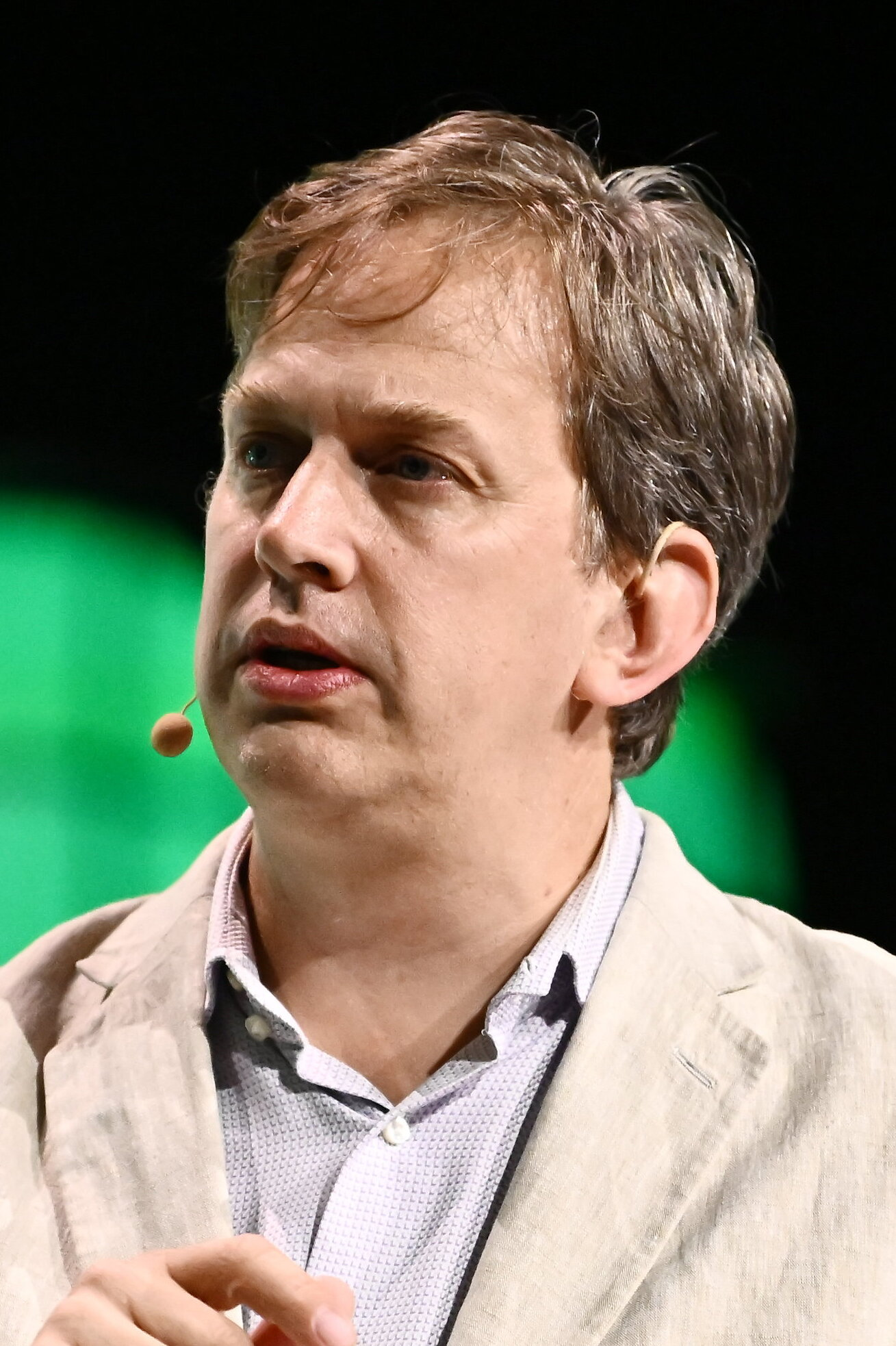
- Marche in 2024
- Born: 1976 (age 49–50); Edmonton, Alberta, Canada
- Occupation: Journalist
- Website: stephenmarche.com

Stephen Marche (/mɑːrʃ/ MARSH; born 1976) is a Canadian novelist, essayist, and cultural commentator.

== Education and early career ==
He is an alumnus of the University of King's College and City College of New York (CUNY). In 2005, he received a doctorate in early modern English drama from the University of Toronto. He taught Renaissance drama at CUNY until 2007, when he resigned in order to write full-time.

== Career ==
Marche is a contributing editor at Esquire, for which he writes a monthly column entitled "A Thousand Words about Our Culture". In 2011, this column was a finalist for the American Society of Magazine Editors award for columns and commentary. Marche's articles also appear in The New York Times, The New Yorker, The Atlantic, The Walrus, The Guardian, and other publications. Marche is also a weekly contributor to CBC Radio.

Marche's novel Raymond and Hannah was published in 2005. An anthology of short stories linked by a common plot element, Shining at the Bottom of the Sea, followed in 2007. How Shakespeare Changed Everything was published in 2011. Another novel, The Hunger Of The Wolf, was published in February 2015. Marche's take on the state of male–female relations in the 21st century, The Unmade Bed: The Messy Truth About Men and Women in the Twenty-First Century, was published in March 2017 with contributions from his wife.

Marche wrote an opinion piece published by The New York Times on August 14, 2015, titled "The Closing of the Canadian Mind." In this article he was critical of Stephen Harper, the Prime Minister of Canada, linking him with Rob Ford, former Mayor of Toronto who was involved in a crack cocaine scandal. Marche also published an opinion piece in The New York Times on November 25, 2017, titled "The Unexamined Brutality of the Male Libido," about the challenges and necessity of male engagement with feminism.

Marche wrote an essay published by The New York Times Book Review on February 26, 2023, titled "A Writer's Lament: The Better You Write, the More You Will Fail". The essay discussed writing and failure and noted that "failure" is normal for writers much of the time, and that near-obsessive persevering in the face of failure to be published is the mark of a true writer. In particular, he noted that a writer may have commercial success at times, but still, their best work may be the biggest failure (perhaps only recognized after a writer has died—using Melville's Billy Budd as an example). In the last paragraph of the essay, Marche wrote: "Good writers offer advice. Great writers offer condolences."

Marche wrote an opinion piece published by The New York Times on August 24, 2026, titled "America Came for Canada. We Said No." The article comments on the breakdown of trade talks between Canada and the United States, and places responsibility for the breakdown and the escalating trade war in the hands of Donald Trump.

== Personal life ==
Marche is married to Sarah Fulford, the former editor-in-chief of Toronto Life magazine. Fulford is a daughter of Canadian journalist Robert Fulford. Marche and Fulford have a daughter and a son, and live in Toronto.

== Bibliography ==
=== Novels ===
- Raymond and Hannah (2005)
- Love and the Mess We're in (2012)
- The Hunger of the Wolf (2015)
- The Last Election (co-authored with Andrew Yang, 2023)
- Death of an Author (co-authored with ChatGPT and Cohere, 2023)

=== Short fiction ===
- Shining at the Bottom of the Sea (2007)

=== Non-fiction ===
- How Shakespeare Changed Everything (2011)
- The Unmade Bed: The Messy Truth About Men and Women in the Twenty-First Century (2017)
- The Next Civil War: Dispatches from the American Future (2022)
- On Writing and Failure: Or, On the Peculiar Perseverance Required to Endure the Life of a Writer (Field Notes, 2023)

=== Essays and reporting ===
- "In praise of the new narcissism", Esquire, January 2013.
- "The Closing of the Canadian Mind", The New York Times, 14 August 2015.
- "The Unexamined Brutality of the Male Libido", The New York Times, 25 November 2017.
- "Al Qaeda Won", Foreign Policy, 10 September 2018.
- "The 'debate of the century': what happened when Jordan Peterson debated Slavoj Žižek", The Guardian, 20 April 2019.
- "The America I loved is gone", The Guardian, 20 April 2025.
- "Canadians Are Seriously Worried About War With the U.S.", The Atlantic, 4 May 2025.
- "America Came for Canada. We Said No.", The New York Times, 24 August 2026.
