= Richard Barnett (Capitol rioter) =

American rioter (born 1960)

- Born: Richard Morris Barnett; May 1960 (age 66); Memphis, Tennessee, U.S.
- Occupations: Salesperson; firefighter
- Known for: Participation in the January 6 United States Capitol attack
- Convictions: Eight charges including: civil disorder, disorderly conduct in a capitol building, and theft of government property
- Penalty: 54 months confinement, 36 months probation, $2,000 fine

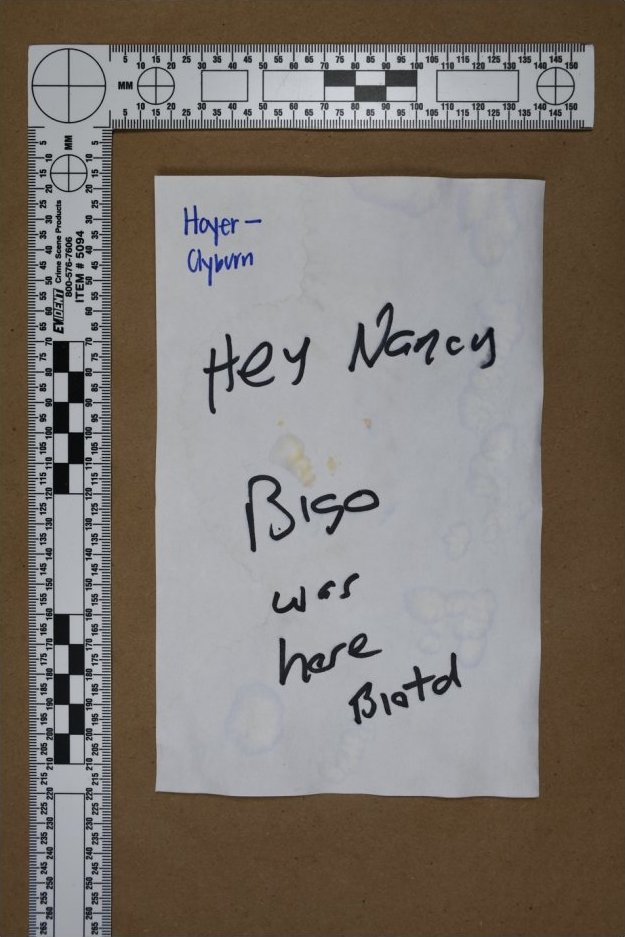
Evidence photograph of the note left by Barnett

Richard Morris "Bigo" Barnett (born May 1960) is an American man who took part in the United States Capitol attack on January 6, 2021. A photograph of Barnett with his feet on a desk in then-House Speaker Nancy Pelosi's office in the Capitol building became one of the most prominent images of the January 6 attack.

In 2023, he was convicted of eight crimes, including four felonies. He was sentenced to 54 months of incarceration on May 24, 2023.

Barnett was pardoned by President Donald Trump on January 20, 2025, and was released from custody the following day.

== Career and activism ==
Barnett described himself as a retired Memphis firefighter, although Memphis Fire Services were unable to verify the statement. His lawyer described him as a window salesman.

Barnett has described himself as the co-founder of the 2A NWA STAND, a pro-Second Amendment rights group.

== Photographed during January 6 United States Capitol attack ==
On January 6, 2021, photojournalist Saul Loeb was working for the newswire service Agence France-Presse, assigned to document the joint session of Congress. Upon arriving at the Capitol that morning, Loeb noted "security postures were the same as any typical day on Capitol Hill — which was a little surprising, given how many people were in town for the Trump rally, and knowing that they were going to come to the Hill". Hours later, the Capitol was breached by a violent mob led by members of the Proud Boys militia who planned to use violence to stop the transfer of power.

After following a crowd, Loeb arrived in the Speaker's Office where he photographed Barnett. Barnett put his feet on a desk in House Speaker Nancy Pelosi’s office, after trespassing into the U.S. Capitol armed with a stun gun. Barnett also wrote a note for Pelosi and left it on her desk. The note read:

"Hey Nancy, Bigo was here bi-otch."

After the attack, Barnett boasted about his actions online, including stealing an envelope. He spent six minutes in the building.

Loeb recalled the image, saying: "This is the office of the Speaker of the House! She’s third in line for the presidency, and this is normally a pretty tough place to get into. So I kept going through the office, and eventually came across this guy sitting at one of the staffers’ desks with his feet up. He’s pretty jovial, and looking through some of the papers on the desk. The staffers that had been in there earlier had left in such a hurry that there were still emails open on their computers. People had left their cell phones on their desks. It was clear that whoever had left was in a big hurry and probably scared, and wanted to get out as fast as they could. But now these guys are in there, treating it as if it were their home. It was a pretty jarring sight to see."

Barnett welcomed having his photograph taken and provided Loeb with his name.

=== Publication and reception ===
The photo quickly went viral, being shared widely on social media. By the evening of January 6, the mayor of Barnett's hometown issued a statement saying "This picture has gone viral and has brought the city of Gravette into the spotlight, which is unfortunate... We have had citizens receive threats, calls to our police, social media posts, and emails wanting to know what Gravette is going to do about this situation."

Jeffrey A. Rosen, acting attorney general of the United States, described the photograph as "shocking" and "repulsive". The Washington Post ran a headline about the photograph: "Many of the images from the Capitol riot showed the terror. One highlighted the smugness"

The photograph was described in The Washington Post as "one of the more shocking images in a day filled with them", while ABC News characterized it as "infamous". By June 2021, Barnett had begun selling autographed copies of the photo for $100 in a fundraiser that bragged the photo had turned him into "the face of the new anti-Federalist movement". Barnett participation in the photo led Canada's CBC to describe him as "one of the most recognizable figures of Jan. 6".

Loeb, a 2004 alumnus of the University of Arizona School of Journalism, was profiled by his alma mater and he was widely interviewed about his experience in the Speaker's office.

=== Arrest, trial and incarceration ===
On January 8, 2021, Barnett was arrested. He was indicted on January 29 of four misdemeanor and four felony charges: disorderly conduct; "obstruction of an official proceeding; aiding and abetting; entering and remaining in a restricted building or grounds with a deadly or dangerous weapon; parading, demonstrating or picketing in a capitol building; and theft of government property." On February 4, 2021, Barnett pleaded not guilty to all charges.

Judge Christopher "Casey" Cooper allowed Barnett to be released from jail on April 27, 2021, warning him that it was a test, and noting Barnett's "outlandish behavior and attempts to avoid detection after the riot, brandishing of guns in public, taking a stun gun into the Capitol and his possible adherence to some QAnon conspiracy theories".

His Washington, D.C. criminal trial was one of the highest profile prosecutions of a January 6 rioter. Barnett was represented in court by Joseph D. McBride, an attorney known for his defense of the January 6 Capitol rioters.

After approximately two hours of jury deliberation, Barnett was found guilty of all charges in January 2023, including civil disorder and obstruction of an official proceeding. On May 24, 2023, he was sentenced to 54 months in prison. At the sentencing prosecution brought up Barnett's attempt to profit from his crimes by selling autographed photos of himself in Pelosi's office, and the fact that several Capitol staffers left public service due to trauma caused by the riot. After release, he was to be subject to 36 months supervised release and a $2,000 fine.

Following sentencing Barnett requested that he be placed at Federal Prison Camp, Yankton, in Yankton, South Dakota, and that he be allowed to wait until August 22 to self-report to prison. He was allowed to self-report, but all his other requests were denied. He stated he plans to appeal the conviction.

On January 20, 2025, after beginning his second term in office, President Trump issued pardons to Barnett and roughly 1,500 other individuals charged with crimes connected to January 6. He was released from prison the next day.

== Personal life ==
Barnett was born at St. Joseph's Hospital in Memphis, Tennessee. At the time of the Capitol attack, he was aged 60 and lived in Gravette, Arkansas.

== See also ==
- Adam Christian Johnson, Capitol rioter known as "Lectern Guy" or "Podium Guy", known for a photograph in which he carried House speaker Nancy Pelosi's lectern
- Kevin Seefried, Capitol rioter known for photographs in which he carried a Confederate battle flag
- List of cases of the January 6 United States Capitol attack (A-F)
- Criminal proceedings in the January 6 United States Capitol attack
- List of people granted executive clemency in the second Trump presidency
