= Scott Sagan =

American political scientist (born 1955)

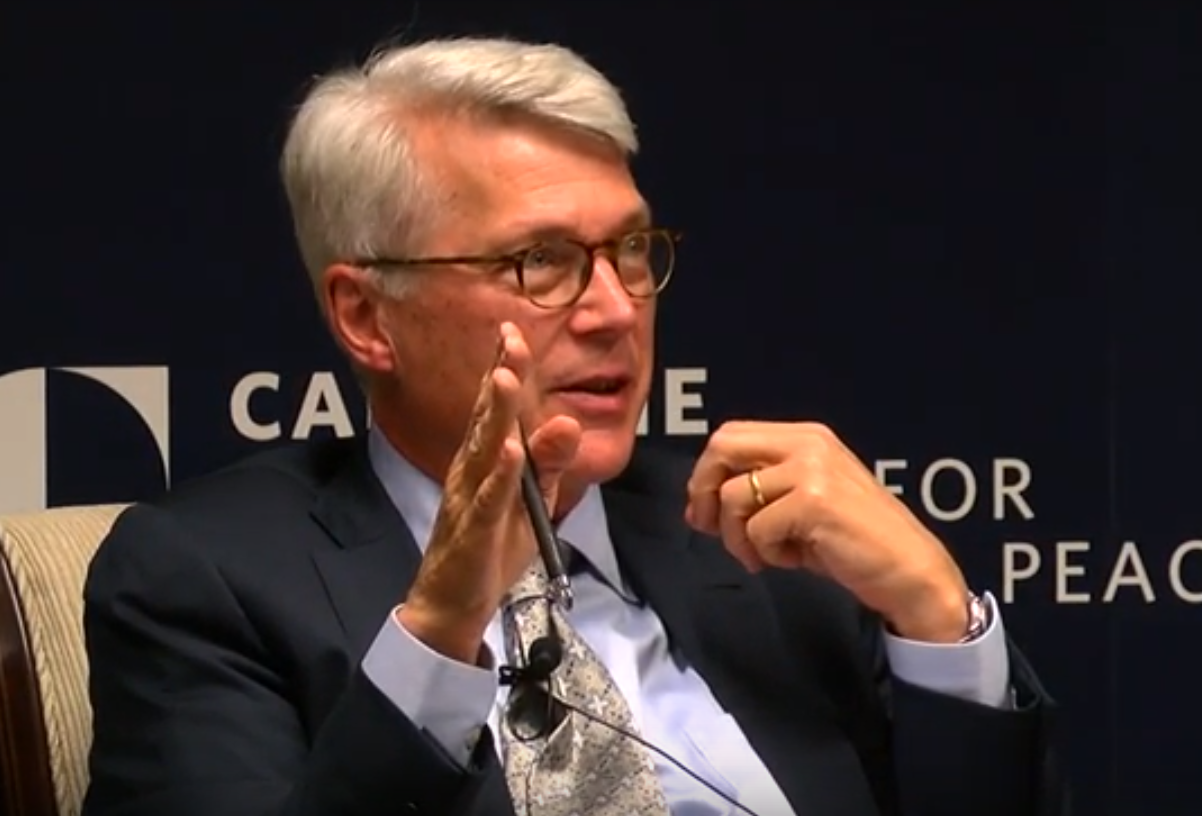
- Scott Sagan in 2018
- Born: Scott Douglas Sagan; 1955 (age 70–71)

Education
- Education: Oberlin College (BA); Harvard University (PhD)

Philosophical work
- Institutions: Stanford University; Harvard University
- Main interests: Nuclear proliferation

Scott Douglas Sagan (born 1955) is the Caroline S.G. Munro Professor of Political Science at Stanford University and co-director of Stanford's Center for International Security and Cooperation (CISAC). He is known for his research on nuclear weapons policy and nuclear disarmament, including discussions of system accidents, and has published widely on these subjects.

In 2017 Sagan received the International Studies Association's Susan Strange Award. Sagan was the recipient of the National Academy of Sciences William and Katherine Estes Award in 2015 and the International Studies Association's Distinguished Scholar Award in 2013.

He currently serves as the American Academy of Arts and Sciences' Chair of the Committee on International Security Studies and on the academy's Council.

== Biography ==
Sagan holds a B.A. in government from Oberlin College (1977) and a Ph.D. from Harvard University (1983). He spent the junior year of his undergraduate degree at the University of Aberdeen in Scotland. Before joining the Stanford faculty in 1987, Sagan was a lecturer in the Department of Government at Harvard University and served as special assistant to the director of the Organization of the Joint Chiefs of Staff at the Pentagon. He has served as a consultant to the office of the Secretary of Defense and at the Sandia National Laboratories and the Los Alamos National Laboratory.

== Work ==
Sagan is known for his research on the organizations managing nuclear weapons and published on the subject in The Limits of Safety: Organizations, Accidents, and Nuclear Weapons (Princeton University Press, 1993). Bruce G. Blair writes, "Scott Sagan's book [The Limits of Safety] is nothing less than a tour de force.... It is by far the most carefully researched and painstaking study of nuclear weapons safety ever written."

Sagan also is one of the leading pessimist scholars about nuclear proliferation, and his co-authored book with Kenneth Waltz, The Spread of Nuclear Weapons: A Debate Renewed, is widely read and cited in the literature on nuclear weapons. Sagan writes in the book, "the United States and the Soviet Union survived the Cold War and did not use their massive nuclear-weapons arsenals during the period's repeated crises. This should be a cause of celebration and wonder; it should not be an excuse for inaction with either arms control or non-proliferation policies."

Sagan's most recent publications include The Fragile Balance of Terror: Deterrence in the New Nuclear Age, co-edited with Vipin Narang (Cornell University Press, 2022); Insider Threats, co-edited with Matthew Bunn (Cornell University Press, 2017); Learning from a Disaster: Improving Nuclear Safety and Security after Fukushima, co-edited with Edward D. Blandford (Stanford University Press, 2016); and guest editor of a two-volume special issue of Daedalus, New Dilemmas in Ethics, Technology, and War (Fall 2016 and Winter 2017).

Sagan is also the author of Moving Targets: Nuclear Strategy and National Security (Princeton University Press, 1989); and The Limits of Safety: Organizations, Accidents, and Nuclear Weapons (Princeton University Press, 1993). He is the co-editor of Planning the Unthinkable (Cornell University Press, 2000) with Peter R. Lavoy and James L. Wirtz; the editor of Inside Nuclear South Asia (Stanford University Press, 2009); co-editor of a two-volume special issue of Daedalus, On the Global Nuclear Future (Fall 2009 and Winter 2010), with Steven E. Miller. Other publications include "The Case for No First Use" in Survival (June 2009); "A Call for Global Nuclear Disarmament" in Nature (July 2012); "Atomic Aversion: Experimental Evidence on Taboos, Traditions, and the Non-Use of Nuclear Weapons" with Daryl G. Press and Benjamin A. Valentino in The American Political Science Review (February 2013); and the American Academy of Arts and Sciences occasional paper, "A Worst Practices Guide to Insider Threats: Learning from Past Mistakes," (2014), with Matthew Bunn.

== Awards ==
Scott Sagan was selected in 2018 by the Carnegie Corporation as an Andrew Carnegie Fellow. In 2017, Scott Sagan received the International Studies Association's Susan Strange Award. The award recognizes a person whose "singular intellect, assertiveness, and insight most challenge conventional wisdom and intellectual and organizational complacency" in the international studies community. Sagan was the recipient of the National Academy of Sciences William and Katherine Estes Award in 2015, for his pioneering work addressing the risks of nuclear weapons and the causes of nuclear proliferation. The award, which is granted triennially, recognizes "research in any field of cognitive or behavioral science that advances understanding of issues relating to the risk of nuclear war." In 2013, Sagan received the International Studies Association's International Security Studies Section Distinguished Scholar Award.

Sagan has also won four teaching awards: the 2020 Phi Beta Kappa of Northern California Teaching Excellence Award; the Monterey Institute for International Studies' 2009 Outstanding Contribution to Nonproliferation Education Award; the International Studies Association's 2008 Deborah Misty Gerner Innovative Teaching Award; Stanford University's 1998-99 Dean's Award for Distinguished Teaching; and Stanford University's 1996 Laurance and Naomi Hoagland Prize for Undergraduate Teaching. He teaches a popular course with Allen Weiner called "The Face of Battle," in which students walk key battlefields from American history, performing individual historical roles in staff rides and meeting with national security professionals.

== See also ==
- Nuclear Tipping Point
- Nuclear weapons debate
- Sam Nunn
- William Perry
- Henry Kissinger
- George P. Shultz
