= Paul Ingrassia (lawyer) =

American attorney (born 1995)

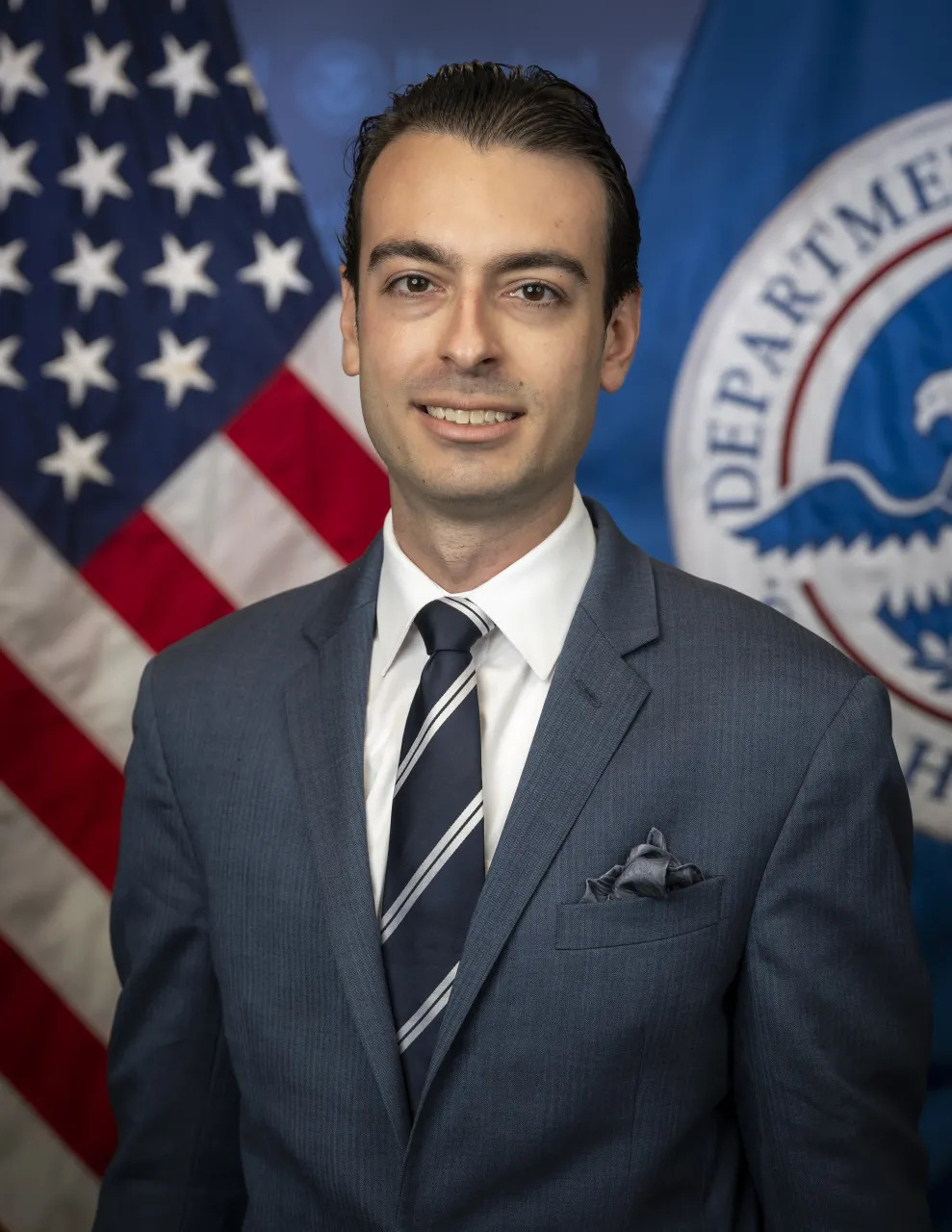
- Official portrait, 2025

General Counsel of the General Services Administration
- Acting
- Assumed office December 1, 2025
- President: Donald Trump
- Preceded by: Russell McGranahan

Deputy General Counsel of the General Services Administration
- Incumbent
- Assumed office November 13, 2025
- President: Donald Trump
- Preceded by: Fernando Laguarda

Personal details
- Born: May 13, 1995 (age 31)
- Party: Republican
- Education: Fordham University (BA); Cornell University (JD)

Paolo Joseph "Paul" Ingrassia (born May 13, 1995) is an American attorney who has served as the acting general counsel of the General Services Administration (GSA) since December 2025. Ingrassia has additionally served as the deputy general counsel of the GSA since November 2025. He served as the White House liaison to the Department of Homeland Security from February to November 2025 and to the United States Department of Justice from January to February 2025.

Ingrassia studied mathematics and economics at Fordham University. After graduating from Cornell Law School in 2022, he worked for the National Constitutional Law Union and for attorney Joseph D. McBride. Ingrassia's Substack page has been cited by President Donald Trump on several occasions; in January 2024, Trump repeated Ingrassia's false claim that Nikki Haley was ineligible to serve as president. Ingrassia also provided legal representation for the Tate brothers amid their investigation for sex trafficking.

In January 2025, Emil Bove, the acting deputy attorney general, named Ingrassia as the White House liaison to the Department of Justice. Amid a dispute with Chad Mizelle, Attorney General Pam Bondi's chief of staff, Ingrassia was reassigned to the Department of Homeland Security the following month. In May, Trump nominated Ingrassia to be special counsel of the United States. His nomination was withdrawn in October after Politico published offensive remarks on race and Nazism that Ingrassia had allegedly texted, along with racial posts on his public social media account. He was appointed the deputy general counsel of the GSA the following month and the agency's acting general counsel in December.

== Early life and education ==
Paul J. Ingrassia was born on May 13, 1995. Ingrassia's mother is a real-estate broker on Long Island. He graduated from Fordham University with a degree in mathematics and economics. He graduated from Cornell Law School in May 2022. Ingrassia served as the senior online editor of the Cornell Journal of Law and Public Policy. According to Politico, three of Ingrassia's former classmates described him as "quiet and closely guarded".

== Career ==
=== Legal and communications work (2018–2025) ===
While attending law school, Ingrassia wrote for The Daily Caller and The Gateway Pundit. He was twice named as a fellow at the Claremont Institute. Ingrassia interned at the White House during Donald Trump's first presidency. He is a New York Young Republican. Ingrassia co-hosted a podcast, Right on Point (2018–2020), with his sister, Olivia. The podcast's Spotify page expressed support for the "timeless ideas" of William F. Buckley Jr. and Russell Kirk, among other conservative writers.

Ingrassia has maintained a Substack that was read by Trump as early as April 2024, according to Politico Magazine; he has described his blog as "President Trump's favorite Substack". In January 2024, he falsely claimed that Nikki Haley was ineligible to serve as president as neither of her parents were born in the United States—an alleged violation of the natural-born-citizen clause—citing a post from the far-right political activist Laura Loomer. The claim was repeated by Trump. According to CNN, Trump had shared Ingrassia's comments nearly one hundred times on social media.

By 2024, Ingrassia had led communications at the National Constitutional Law Union, a self-described counterfirm to the American Civil Liberties Union. He was admitted to the New York bar as an attorney in July 2024. Ingrassia worked at Joseph D. McBride's law firm, the McBride Law Firm, representing clients accused of having participated in the January 6 Capitol attack. At McBride, Ingrassia assisted in the legal affairs of the Tate brothers, who were accused of rape and human trafficking in Romania.

=== White House liaison (January–November 2025) ===
Ingrassia served as a liaison between the second presidential transition of Donald Trump and the Department of Justice. In a lawsuit filed in September, Brian Driscoll, the former acting director of the Federal Bureau of Investigation, alleged that Ingrassia had asked questions regarding Driscoll's loyalty to Trump and his view of diversity, equity, and inclusion initiatives. In January 2025, Ingrassia was appointed as the Trump administration's liaison to the Department of Justice by Emil Bove, the acting deputy attorney general. He was present for the release of pardoned January 6 Capitol attack defendants jailed in the D.C. Jail. During his tenure, he pursued candidates loyal to Trump and called employees who had worked for attorneys general Merrick Garland or William Barr to be fired. Amid a dispute with Chad Mizelle, Attorney General Pam Bondi's chief of staff, Ingrassia was reassigned to the Department of Homeland Security the following month, according to ABC News.

In October, Politico reported that Ingrassia had been investigated for allegedly sexually harassing a lower-ranking female colleague during a July business trip to Orlando, Florida. According to several officials, Ingrassia had arranged for the woman's hotel reservation to be canceled so that she would have to share his room; the woman initially filed a human resources complaint before retracting it days later, fearing retaliation. Two officials stated they were interviewed in September by the inspector general of the Department of Homeland Security regarding allegations of sexual harassment involving Ingrassia. Ingrassia's attorney denied wrongdoing, stating that a human-resources investigation found no misconduct. The woman later issued a statement saying she had "never felt uncomfortable" and that the claims of harassment were "not true." Following the incident, Ingrassia's federal employee badge and access to the Department of Homeland Security's headquarters were temporarily revoked for several days. Ingrassia sued Politico for defamation that month.

In November, ProPublica reported that Ingrassia had intervened to return seized electronic devices from Andrew Tate and his brother Tristan, who received representation from Ingrassia while working at the McBride Law Firm, from Customs and Border Protection. The request reportedly concerned several officials in the Department of Homeland Security, who believed that they would be interfering in a federal investigation by executing the request. Ingrassia's lawyer, Edward Paltzik, denied the allegations. Following the report, Connecticut senator Richard Blumenthal and Michigan senator Gary Peters requested information from the White House and the Department of Homeland Security, referring to Ingrassia's apparent intervention as "brazen interference with a federal investigation".

=== Special Counsel of the United States nomination ===
On May 29, 2025, Trump named Ingrassia as his nominee for the position of special counsel of the United States after the previous special counsel, Hampton Dellinger, had been dismissed in February 2025. In July, after CNN reported on controversial statements Ingrassia had made, the Trump administration claimed that Ingrassia had been supported by "many Jewish groups"; several of those organizations told CNN that they had not heard of Ingrassia. Prior to Ingrassia's hearing before the Senate Committee on Homeland Security and Governmental Affairs, North Carolina senator Thom Tillis told NBC News that he already opposed Ingrassia's nomination for many of his views, including those on the January 6 Capitol attack.

Ingrassia's lack of experience and background elicited concerns from senators. His nomination was opposed by more than twenty federal employee unions, professional associations, and good government groups for his prior comments on federal workers and for prior writings supporting at-will firings of civil servants by the president. In June, Ingrassia's mother went to the Capitol to defend her son before Maryland representative Jamie Raskin and California representative Robert Garcia, according to NOTUS. The following month, he appeared before staffers for the Senate Committee on Homeland Security and Governmental Affairs and was questioned about some of his past social media posts. Hours before he was set to appear before the committee, Ingrassia's hearing was postponed, amid concerns from three of its Republican members—including its chair, Kentucky senator Rand Paul—over allegedly antisemitic comments Ingrassia had made.

Ingrassia's nomination faced complications after Trump nominated Sergio Gor, the director of the White House Presidential Personnel Office, as ambassador to India and he was succeeded by Dan Scavino; according to Politico, Ingrassia was not as close with Scavino as he was with Gor, though he was still supported by other Trump aides, including Natalie Harp. Following Politico's publication of offensive remarks Ingrassia had allegedly made in several text messages on October 20, Senate Majority Leader John Thune stated that Ingrassia's nomination was "not gonna pass" and urged the White House to withdraw it. Thune was joined by three Republican members of the Senate Committee on Homeland Security and Governmental Affairs who expressed opposition to Ingrassia's confirmation. The following day, Ingrassia announced that he was withdrawing his confirmation hearing, citing his belief that the committee would not confirm him. A Trump administration official told Politico that his nomination had been withdrawn.

=== General Services Administration positions (November 2025–present) ===
On November 13, 2025, Ingrassia sent out an email stating that he would become the deputy general counsel of the General Services Administration (GSA). According to Ingrassia, Trump personally offered him the job in the Oval Office the evening before. By December 3, Ingrassia had become the agency's acting general counsel. That day, six Democrats on the Senate Committee on Homeland Security and Governmental Affairs sent a letter to Dan Scavino and acting administrator of the GSA Michael Rigas calling for Ingrassia to be removed immediately and questioning his continued presence despite the publication of offensive remarks he allegedly made. Politico reported that some officials within the GSA privately questioned Ingrassia's role and influence following his appointment, despite public statements of confidence from agency leadership.

== Views ==
=== Domestic and political affairs ===
Following the 2020 presidential election, Ingrassia called for Trump to declare martial law and called for secession if efforts to overturn the election failed. He denounced Sebastian Gorka for rebuking a post that called for Vice President Mike Pence—whom Ingrassia previously compared to well-known traitors Marcus Junius Brutus and Judas Iscariot—to be arrested and hanged. Ingrassia has referred to federal workers as "parasites" and "bugmen".

On the anniversary of the September 11 attacks, Ingrassia shared a video from Alex Jones espousing a conspiracy theory that the United States government had advance knowledge of the attacks. In response to a 2024 questionnaire from Project 2025, he wrote that he supported stopping immigration, imposing voting tests, and cutting down the workforce at federal agencies because of "toxic ideologies".

=== Racial views ===
Ingrassia has described "straight White men" as an intellectually superior group that should be prioritized in education. In 2023, he called for reparations from the descendants of slaves to the descendants of slave owners.

In October 2025, Politico published text messages from a group chat with Republican "operatives and influencers" in which Ingrassia made numerous racist statements. In the messages, which were verified by Politico, Ingrassia wrote that Martin Luther King Jr. "was the 1960s George Floyd" and that his holiday should be "tossed into the seventh circle of Hell". He used an Italian slur for Black people while calling for the discontinuation of all African-American holidays, adding that "Blacks behave that way because that's their natural state" and that "all of Africa is a shithole". In reference to Vivek Ramaswamy, Ingrassia wrote, "Never trust a Chinaman or Indian"; he also stated that, "We need competent white men in positions of leadership", while rejecting the notion that "all men are created equal". When another participant in the chat compared him to the Hitler Youth, Ingrassia responded, "I do have a Nazi streak in me from time to time, I will admit it." His attorney initially suggested the texts could be satirical or manipulated, later stating that authentication of the messages was "extremely difficult" and declining to confirm their authenticity.

=== Foreign affairs ===
Ingrassia has referred to the Hamas's October 7 attacks on Israel as a psychological operation meant to distract from the celebration of Columbus Day. Ingrassia later described the attack as "an atrocity, a tragedy" and denied allegations of antisemitism.

== Works cited ==
=== Articles ===
- Asher-Schapiro, Avi; Faturechi, Robert (November 21, 2025). "Senators Launch Inquiry After a White House Official Intervened on Behalf of Andrew Tate During a Federal Investigation". ProPublica.
- Cai, Sophia (September 1, 2023). "How Trump's loyal pen pals spread his message". Axios.
- Dreisbach, Tom (May 30, 2025). "Trump nominates official with ties to antisemitic extremists to lead ethics agency". NPR.
- Faturechi, Robert; Asher-Schapiro, Avi (November 18, 2025). "The White House Intervened on Behalf of Accused Sex Trafficker Andrew Tate During a Federal Investigation". ProPublica.
- Faulders, Katherine; Levine, Mike; Mallin, Alexander (February 24, 2025). "After clashes with AG's top aide, a White House liaison pushing 'loyalty' to Trump at DOJ is reassigned: Sources". ABC News.
- Feuer, Alan; Thrush, Glenn (September 10, 2025). "White House Exerts Enormous Influence Over F.B.I., Lawsuit Says". The New York Times.
- Fuchs, Hailey (July 24, 2025). "Senate GOP-led panel delays testimony for Trump special counsel nominee". Politico.
- Fuchs, Hailey (October 20, 2025). "Thune hopes White House withdraws Ingrassia nomination". Politico.
- Fuchs, Hailey; Lippman, Daniel; Carney, Jordain (October 23, 2025). "Inside the Capitol Hill implosion of Paul Ingrassia". Politico.
- Hillyard, Vaughn; Kosnar, Michael; Pipia, Lindsey; Gregorian, Dareh (May 30, 2025). "Trump nominates former podcast host with history of inflammatory comments for top ethics job". NBC News.
- Kavi, Aishvarya (January 20, 2025). "Joy, Anger and Little Remorse Outside D.C. Jail After Trump's Jan. 6 Pardons". The New York Times.
- Kaczynski, Andrew; Steck, Em (February 26, 2025). "White House point man at Homeland Security shared 'martial law option' post to keep Trump in office". CNN.
- Kaczynski, Andrew; Steck, Em; Abdelwahab, Dalia (July 2, 2025). "White House point man at Homeland Security shared 'martial law option' post to keep Trump in office". CNN.
- Kaczynski, Andrew; Steck, Em (July 9, 2025). "The Trump administration said 'many Jewish groups' support a controversial nominee — some have never heard of him". CNN.
- Lippman, Daniel (October 9, 2025). "Key Trump nominee accused of sexual harassment". Politico.
- Lippman, Daniel (October 20, 2025). "Trump nominee says MLK Jr. holiday belongs in 'hell' and that he has 'Nazi streak,' according to texts". Politico.
- Lippman, Daniel (October 21, 2025). "Ingrassia withdraws nomination after racist texts". Politico.
- Lippman, Daniel (November 13, 2025). "Trump taps Ingrassia for new role after texting scandal". Politico.
- Lippman, Daniel; Barnes, Daniel; Cai, Sophia (December 30, 2025). "The turbulent trajectory of Trump's 'Nazi streak' acolyte". Politico.
- Mancini, Ryan (November 3, 2025). "Senate Democrats call for 'immediate removal' of Trump GSA appointee". The Hill.
- McGraw, Meridith (April 24, 2024). "How Donald Trump Gets His News". Politico Magazine.
- Moore, Amanda (July 23, 2025). "Project 2025 Data Leak Shows a Paul Ingrassia Calling for Test for Voting and Halting Immigration". The Intercept.
- Newman, Andy (May 29, 2025). "Trump Nominates a Former Far-Right Podcast Host to Head an Ethics Watchdog". The New York Times.
- Okun, Eli; Umansky-Castro, Rachel (December 3, 2025). "Trump's crackdown comes to New Orleans". Politico.
- Pengelly, Martin (January 10, 2024). "'Totally baseless': Trump denounced for Nikki Haley 'birther' lie". The Guardian.
- Gorman, Reese; Rogerson, Riley (October 21, 2025). "Embattled Trump Nominee Paul Ingrassia's Mom Tried to Meet With Lawmakers Who Criticized Her Son". NOTUS.
- Rosen, Daniel Edward (May 31, 2025). "Trump Appoints Young Loyalist To Head Key Office That Was Accused of Failing To Protect Whistleblowers in the Hunter Biden Case". The New York Sun.
- Sentner, Irie; Johansen, Ben; Cai, Sophia (October 10, 2025). "And on Day 10, there were RIFs". Politico.
- Thrush, Glenn; Goldman, Adam; Bromwich, Jonah; Haberman, Maggie (February 7, 2025). "At Justice Dept., Trump's Former Criminal Defender Emerges as His Enforcer". The New York Times.
- "Trump nominates far-right blogger to lead government agency that protects whistle-blowers". The Guardian. May 29, 2025.
- Tucker, Brianna; Vinall, Frances (May 29, 2025). "Trump taps right-wing lawyer to head U.S. Office of Special Counsel". The Washington Post.
- Ulloa, Jazmine (September 11, 2024). "Online Legions for Trump and Harris Clash, Wielding Images of Cats and Aliens". The New York Times.
- Wagner, Erich (July 22, 2025). "Unions, good government groups urge rejection of Trump's OSC nominee". Government Executive.
- Wren, Adam; Burns, Dasha (July 23, 2025). "The Epstein crisis hits escape velocity". Politico.

=== Posts ===
- Ingrassia, Paul [@PaulIngrassia] (May 13, 2024). "Thank you everyone for the birthday wishes!" (Tweet) – via X (formerly Twitter).
