= Jonathan Wilkenfeld =

American political scientist and professor

- Born: March 24, 1942 (age 84)
- Occupation: Political scientist

Academic background
- Education: University of Maryland (B.S.); George Washington University (M.A.); Indiana University (Ph.D.)

Academic work
- Discipline: Political science
- Sub-discipline: International relations, Foreign policy, Comparative politics

Jonathan Wilkenfeld (born March 24, 1942) is an American political scientist and professor emeritus at University of Maryland, specialized in foreign policy, terrorism and simulation methodology in political science. He is the Founding Director of the International Communication and Negotiation Simulations Project.

== Career ==
Wilkenfeld attended University of Maryland, where he received a B.S. in Political Science. He later obtained an M.A. from George Washington University and a Ph.D. from Indiana University.

Wilkenfeld has been a professor at University of Maryland since 1969, where he has worked with the university’s Department of Government and Politics and the Institute for Advanced Computer Studies. He is also a research professor of the National Consortium for the Study of Terrorism and Responses to Terrorism.

Wilkenfeld and Michael Brecher are the creators of the International Crisis Behavior Project which maintains an online database of 1,078 countries in international conflict, also called “crisis actors”, and their behavior in over 487 crises international crises since 1918. An example of an international conflict in the database is the Cuban Missile Crisis where the “crisis actors” were the U.S., the Soviet Union and Cuba. The ICB Project has been referenced in a number of academic papers in the analysis of conflict, terror and international crisis.

In 1982, Wilkenfeld founded the International Communication and Negotiation Simulations Project. The project allows students to learn about international relations, crisis management, and negotiation through simulations and scenario-driven exercises. The project has been referenced in multiple academic articles as an example of simulation programs in international relations for educational purposes.

== Research interests ==
Wilkenfeld research focuses on crisis theory, war, protracted social conflict, foreign policy, and international relations in the Middle East and South Asia.

== Selected publications ==
=== Books ===
- The Irgun Zvai Leumi in the Israeli Independence Movement, Columbian College of the George Washington University, 1964 and 1966.
- The Determinants of Domestic and Foreign Conflict Behavior of Nations, Indiana University, 1969.
- Conflict Behavior and Linkage Politics, McKay, 1973.
- Foreign Policy Behavior: The Interstate Behavior Analysis Model, with Gerald W. Hopple and Steve Andriole, SAGE Publications, 1980.
- Crises in the Twentieth Century: Vol I: Handbook of International Crises with Michael Brecher and Sheila Moser, Butterworth-Heinemann, 1988.
- Crises in the Twentieth Century: Vol II: Handbook of Foreign Policy Crises with Michael Brecher and Sheila Moser, Butterworth-Heinemann, 1988.
- Crisis, conflict, and instability (Crises in the Twentieth Century: Volume III), with Michael Brecher and Sheila Moser, Pergamon Press, 1989.
- A Study of Crisis, with Michael Brecher, University of Michigan Press, 1997 and 2000.
- Negotiating a Complex World, with Brigid Starkey and Mark A. Boyer, Rowman & Littlefield Publishers, 1999, 2005, 2010 and 2015.
- Mediating International Crises, with Victor Asal, David Quinn, and Kathleen Young, Routledge, 2005 and 2007.
- Proceedings of the First International Conference on Computational Cultural Dynamics, with Dana Nau, Association for the Advancement of Artificial Intelligence, 2007.
- Peace and Conflict, with Joseph Hewitt and Ted Gurr, Routledge, 2008, 2010 and 2012.
- Myth and Reality in International Politics: Meeting Global Challenges Through Collective Action, Routledge, 2016.
- Research Handbook on Mediating International Crises, with Kyle Beardsley and David Quinn, Edward Elgar Publishing, 2019.

=== Edited collections ===
- Crisis in the Twentieth Century, co-edited with Michael Brecher, (3 volumes), 1988, 1989.

== Awards ==
- International Landmark Award, University of Maryland, 2003.
- Distinguished Scholar Award, International Studies Association, 2004.
- Distinguished Scholar Teacher Award, University of Maryland, 2009.
- Gerner Innovative Teaching in International Studies Award, International Studies Association, Foreign Policy Analysis Section, 2012.
- Dean’s Medal, College of Behavioral and Social Sciences, University of Maryland, 2013.
- Susan Strange Award, International Studies Association, 2019.
