= Ted Robert Gurr =

Political scientist (1936-2017) working on revolution and conflict

- Born: February 21, 1936; Spokane, Washington, U.S.
- Died: November 25, 2017 (aged 81); Las Vegas, Nevada
- Education: New York University (Ph.D., 1965); Reed College (B.A., 1957)
- Known for: Neorealism
- Scientific career
- Fields: Political science
- Workplaces: University of Maryland; University of Colorado; Northwestern University; Princeton University
- Doctoral advisor: Harry H. Eckstein

Ted Robert Gurr (February 21, 1936 – November 25, 2017) was an American author and professor of political science who most notably wrote about political conflict and instability. His widely translated book Why Men Rebel (1970) emphasized the importance of social psychological factors (relative deprivation) and ideology as root sources of political violence. He was Distinguished University Professor emeritus at the University of Maryland and consulted on projects he established there. He died in November 2017.

== Career ==
Before joining the University of Maryland faculty in 1989 Gurr held academic positions at Princeton University (1965–69), Northwestern University (1970–83), where he was Payson S. Wild Professor and chair of the political science department (1977–80), and the University of Colorado at Boulder (1984–88).

In 1968 Gurr was asked to join the staff of the National Commission on the Causes and Prevention of Violence, established by President Lyndon B. Johnson after the assassinations of Martin Luther King Jr. and Robert F. Kennedy. He teamed with historian Hugh Davis Graham to prepare the 1969 report Violence in America: Historical and Comparative Perspectives, which was widely publicized and published in many editions, the last of them in 1989, Violence in America, vol. 1, The History of Crime, and vol. 2, Protest, Rebellion, Reform.

The Polity study, begun by Gurr in the late 1960s, profiles the democratic and autocratic traits of all regimes worldwide from 1800 to the present. The project is now directed by Dr. Monty G. Marshall of the Center for Systemic Peace, one of the two dozen Ph.D.'s whose doctoral work he has supervised. The Polity data is widely used by researchers and government agencies to track democratization and to assess the stability of contemporary regimes.

The Minorities at Risk project, which he began in 1985, assesses the political status and activities of more than 300 ethnic and religious minorities world-wide. The MAR project, which is continued by a research team at the University of Maryland's Center for International Development and Conflict Management (CIDCM), provides data for his and others’ analyses of the causes and management of ethnopolitical protest and rebellion, most recently in Peoples versus States: Minorities at Risk in the New Century and Ethnic Conflict in World Politics, coauthored with Barbara Harff.

In 1994-95 Gurr helped establish the State Failure Task Force (now the Political Instability Task Force) at the request of Vice President Gore's office, to provide global risk assessments of impending intrastate conflicts. He continued to serve as senior consultant to the task force under the George W. Bush administration and the Obama administration.

Gurr was a member of a network of scholars concerned with risks and prevention of genocide since 2001, and participated in the 2004 Stockholm International Forum on the Prevention of Genocide, an international conference hosted by the Foreign Ministry of Sweden. In 2002 he was awarded an honorary doctorate by the University of Sofia, Bulgaria. In 2004-05 he organized a workshop on economic roots of terrorism for the Club of Madrid's International Summit on Democracy, Terrorism and Security, which was convened by the Spanish Foreign Ministry to commemorate the first anniversary of the Madrid train bombings in March 2004.

His recent projects included periodic assessments of risks of genocide and politicide, with Barbara Harff, and a comparative study of "unholy alliances" between terrorists and international criminal networks, with Lyubov Mincheva of the University of Sofia.

In 2012 Gurr accepted an offer to be a lecturer and Visiting Scholar at the University of Nevada, Las Vegas.

== Work ==
Gurr has written or edited more than twenty books and monographs. Most recent was Peace and Conflict 2012, with University of Maryland co-authors J. Joseph Hewitt and Jonathan Wilkenfeld. He and Monty G. Marshall established this biennial report series in 2001 to provide scholars, analysts and journalists with current information on global conflict trends and risks of future instability. Earlier editions documented the global decline in internal wars during the 1990s and the ascendancy of negotiated agreements for managing ethnic and other internal conflicts.

His latest academic book, coauthored with Lyubov Mincheva, is Crime-Terror Alliances and the State (2013) He also coauthored two books in genealogy and social history, Coming of Age in the West 1883-1906 and A Gurr Family Odyssey, with Paul Magel.

Gurr held a Guggenheim Fellowship (1972–73), a Fulbright Senior Fellowship (Australia, 1981–82), and a US Institute of Peace Fellowship (1988–89). In 1993-94 he was president of the International Studies Association, an international body of 3000+ scholars and policy makers. In 1996-97 he held the Swedish government's Olof Palme Visiting Professorship at the University of Uppsala.

== Books ==
- Why Men Rebel (Princeton, 1970)
- Violence In America (with historian Hugh Davis Graham, U.S. Government Printing Office, Bantam Books, and Praeger, 1969; Sage Publications, 1979)
- Handbook of political conflict: Theory and research (The free press, New York, 1980)
- The State and the City, coauthored with Desmond King (University of Chicago Press, 1987)
- Ethnic Conflict in World Politics, coauthored with Barbara Harff (Westview Press, 1994, revised edition, 2003).
- Early Warning of Communal Conflict and Genocide: Linking Empirical Research and International Responses (United Nations University Press, 1996)
- Preventive Measures: Building Risk Assessment and Crisis Early Warning Systems, coedited by Gurr and John L. Davies (Rowman & Littlefield, 1998).
- Peoples Versus States: Minorities at Risk in the New Century (U.S. Institute of Peace Press, 2000)
- Peace and Conflict 2010, coauthored with Joseph Hewitt, Jonathan Wilkenfeld (Paradigm Publishers, 2009)

== See also ==
- Charles Tilly
- Theda Skocpol
