= Minorities at Risk =

American university research project

Minorities At Risk (MAR) is a university-based research project that monitors and analyzes the status and conflicts of 283 politically-active communal groups in many countries throughout the world from 1945 to 2006. Those minorities included have been deemed politically significant, meaning that the group collectively suffers or benefits from systematic discriminatory treatment at the hands of other societal groups and the group is the foundation of political mobilization and collective action in defense or promotion of self-defined interests. MAR seeks to identify where the groups are located, what they do, and what happens to them. The project is designed to provide information in a standardized format that aids comparative research and contributes to the understanding of conflicts involving relevant groups. The MAR project was initiated by Ted Robert Gurr in 1986 and has been based at the University of Maryland's Center for International Development and Conflict Management (CIDCM) since 1988.

== Dataset and requirements ==
Scholars have found the dataset useful for studying ethnic protest, mobilization, and rebellion; however, it does not include all minority groups across the world. There are specific requirements that shape inclusion and statistics of groups analyzed, namely:

1. MAR includes groups only in countries with a population (within the year of interest) greater than 500,000;
2. MAR includes groups only if in the year of interest they numbered at least 100,000 or, if fewer, exceeded 1% of the population of at least one country in which they resided;
3. MAR includes groups separately in each country in which they meet the general criteria. For example, it profiles Kurds separately in Turkey, Iraq, and Iran;
4. MAR includes advantaged minorities like the Sunni Arabs of Iraq and the Overseas Chinese of Southeast Asia, but excludes advantaged majorities;
5. MAR excludes refugee and immigrant groups unless and until they are regarded by outside observers as permanent residents;
6. MAR counts and codes groups at the highest level within-country level of aggregation that is politically meaningful. For example, all Hispanics in the U.S. are profiled as a single group because they are usually regarded and treated by Anglo-Americans as one collectivity; and,
7. MAR estimates membership in a group using the widest demographic definition, even though not all people who nominally are members of a group necessarily identify with it.

== Group types ==
MAR groups are categorized into six groups which refer to the populations’ past and current struggles on the basis of racial/historical/ethnical variances from the majority population of their country.

1. Ethnonationalist: regionally concentrated peoples with a history of organized political autonomy with their own state, traditional ruler, or regional government who have supported political movements for autonomy at some time since 1945.

2. Indigenous: conquered descendants of earlier inhabitants of a region who live primarily in conformity with traditional social, economic, and cultural customs that are sharply distinct from those of dominant groups.

3. Ethnoclass: ethnically or culturally distinct, usually descended from slaves or immigrants, most of whom occupy a distinct social and economic stratum or niche.

4. Communal Contender: culturally distinct peoples, tribes, or clans in heterogeneous societies who hold or seek a share in state power.

-Disadvantaged: subject to some degree of political, economic, or cultural discrimination but lack offsetting advantages

-Advantaged: those with political advantage over other groups in their society

-Dominant: those with a preponderance of both political and economic power

5. Religious Sect: communal groups that differ from others principally in their religious beliefs and related cultural practices, and whose political status and activities are centered on the defense of their beliefs.

6. National Minority: segments of a trans-state people with a history of organized political autonomy whose kindred control of an adjacent state, but who constitute a minority in the state in which they reside.

== Phases ==
There are five phases completed thus far for the dataset. Phase I covered 227 communal groups, which met the criteria for classification as a minority at risk for the years 1945–1990; Phase II covered 275 groups from 1990–96; Phase III covered 275 groups from 1996–1999; Phase IV covered 283 groups from 1998–2003; and phase V covered 283 groups from 2003–2006. Also available is the Minorities at Risk Organizational Behavior (MAROB) which began in 2005 with the purpose of answering fundamental questions focusing on the identification of those factors that motivate some members of ethnic minorities to become radicalized, to form activist organizations, and to move from conventional means of politics and protest into violence and terrorism.

== How it is coded ==
The data is coded by-hand by undergraduate and graduate students under the direct supervision of directors. The information is culled from a variety of sources; journalistic accounts, government reports, group orgs, scholarly material. Coders rely upon multiple sources for each code assigned as often as possible. Variables are broken down into four categories: Group Characteristics, Group Status, External Support, and Group Conflict Behavior. For all of the phases, there are a varying number of variables for which have been coded. Phase V includes 71 core variables and 282 groups. There are codebooks for every phase of recorded data. The variables range from descriptive traits referring to their population and location in the world, to their active protests and rebellions, to the discriminatory practices that affect them. The data allows viewers to see trends by years, country, or conflict.

Such an analysis can be done over many years and at both the group and country level. For example, here are the calculated means for three variables, including rebellion, protest, and political discrimination, for African Americans, Hispanics, Native Americans, and Native Hawaiians within the United States. The means for the years 1985–1993 can then be compared to the country's average as well as the overall average for all groups included in the database.

African Americans: 1.0 (political discrimination), 3.33 (protest), 0 (rebellion)
Hispanics: 1.0 (political discrimination), 3.00 (protest), 1.11 (rebellion)
Native Americans: 1.00 (political discrimination), 2.56 (protest), 0 (rebellion)
Native Hawaiians: 0 (political discrimination), 2.33 (protest), 0 (rebellion)
United States aggregate level: 0.75 (political discrimination), 2.81 (protest), 0.28 (rebellion)
Overall average for the database: 1.86 (political discrimination), 1.37 (protest), 0.92 (rebellion)

The codebooks allow for an understanding of what each number means (e.g., a 1 for political discrimination represents neglect/remedial policies and a 3 for protest represents small demonstrations numbering less than 10,000 actors).
