= Death of an Author (novella) =

2023 novella by Stephen Marche

- Author: Stephen Marche (under the pen-name Aidan Marchine)
- Language: English
- Publisher: Pushkin Industries
- Publication date: 2023
- Publication place: United States
- Media type: Digital
- Pages: 104

Death of an Author is a 2023 novella by Stephen Marche, under the pen name of Aidan Marchine. It has been noted as one of the first books to feature extensive use of artificial intelligence-generated text, including by ChatGPT and Cohere.

== Development ==
Marche used ChatGPT, Cohere, and Sudowrite to create the book. He claims that 95% of the book was AI-generated. The cover art and blurbs were also AI-generated. He produced the novella within months.

Following production of the book, Marche has argued that artificial intelligence will play an important role in the creative industries in the future.

== Themes ==
Gus Dupin is an academic who receives news of the death of Peggy Firmin, a writer who Dupin extensively researched about.

The novella is a crime-mystery. It features the theme of artificial intelligence.

== Reception ==
The New York Times described the book as "arguably the first halfway readable A.I. novel, an early glimpse at what is vectoring toward readers." New Scientist described the work as "not awful". Slate described it as "pretty good". The book has been discussed within academic papers.
