= Steve Andriole =

American writer, professor

Stephen Andriole
- Born: Philadelphia, Pennsylvania, United States
- Occupations: Author, professor, consultant

Stephen J. Andriole is an American information technology professional and professor at Villanova University who has designed and developed a variety of interactive computer-based systems for industry and government, from positions in academia (Professor, chairman, R&D Center Director), government (Director of Cybernetics Technology at DARPA) and industry (CIO, CTO, SVP, Director and CEO).

He is well known for the design and development of a global crisis warning system—the Early Warning & Monitoring System—whose output appeared in President Ronald Reagan's Daily Briefing Book. His research portfolio while at DARPA included early funding of the MIT Architecture Machine Group now known as the MIT Media Lab, research in artificial intelligence at Yale University and Carnegie-Mellon University, computer simulation, computer-aided decision analysis and computer-based crisis management. At DARPA, he funded one of the first research programs in counter-terrorism crisis management.

Andriole is also well known for the design and development of the United States' first totally online Masters program in information systems (MSIS), with the support of Alfred P. Sloan Foundation while at Drexel University. He was also the principal architect of the investment strategy of Safeguard Scientifics, Inc. (NYSE: SFE) that led to multiple Initial Public Offerings (IPOs) of Internet companies with a total market capitalization of over $100B.

He is also known through the publication of over 35 books and 500 articles in artificial intelligence and machine learning, information systems engineering, defense command and control, interactive systems design and development, human-computer interaction, venture investing, technology due to diligence, social media, emerging technology and information technology.

He is a Fellow of the Cutter Consortium, was a charter member of the U.S. government's Senior Executive Service (SES), received the Defense Meritorious Civilian Service Award for his work at DARPA, and was awarded an Honorary Doctorate from La Salle University in 2000. He currently holds the Thomas G. Labrecque Chair of Business Technology at Villanova University's School of Business where he teaches AI & machine learning, strategic technology, innovation, business consulting, entrepreneurialism and technology management.

== Government ==
Andriole was the Director of the Cybernetics Technology Office (CTO) at DARPA where he managed a program of research and development that led to a number of scientific and technological advances in the broad-based information, decision and computing sciences. While at DARPA, he funded the development of spatial data management and multimedia systems, decision support systems, computer-aided simulation and training systems, and intelligent technology-based command & control systems. He funded MIT's Architecture Machine Group, which evolved into the MIT Media Lab. The CTO program also contributed to applications of the ARPANET, interactive training simulations, such as SIMNET, and a host of artificial intelligence-based applications.

== Industry ==
While at Decisions & Designs, Inc., Andriole designed and developed interactive computer-based resource allocation, forecasting and decision-making systems for the federal government and implemented an interactive system for monitoring the interactions among nations, a system that was originally funded by DARPA as part of his PhD dissertation research, and whose output was published in President Reagan's Daily Briefing Book. He pioneered the development and application of storyboard prototyping for requirements validation and management. Andriole was the Chief Technology Officer and Senior Vice President for Technology Strategy at CIGNA Corporation, a global insurance and financial services company, where he was responsible for the enterprise information architecture, computing standards, the technology research & development program, data security, as well as the overall alignment of enterprise information technology investments with CIGNA's multiple lines of business. He was the Chief Technology Officer and Senior Vice President of Safeguard Scientifics, Inc. (NYSE: SFE) where he was responsible for identifying technology trends, translating that insight into the Safeguard investment strategy, and leveraging trends analyses with the Safeguard partner companies. Andriole directly participated in raising nearly $1B for Safeguard and its companies. He also served as the Interim Chief Information Officer at Shire Pharmaceuticals.

== Entrepreneur, investor, and director ==
Andriole founded International Information Systems (IIS), Inc., which designed interactive systems for a variety of corporate and government clients. IIS specialized in requirements analysis and prototyping, the design of user-computer interfaces, and software systems evaluation. He also founded TechVestCo, Inc., a company that provides consulting around technology optimization. Andriole also helped fund multiple companies as an Angel Investor, and served on the board of directors of the Ben Franklin Technology Center of Southeastern Pennsylvania for nearly a decade, among other public and private companies.

== Academia ==
Andriole was a (tenured, full) Professor of Information Systems and Electrical & Computer Engineering at Drexel University in Philadelphia, Pennsylvania. He conducted applied research in information and software systems engineering, principally through the Center for Multidisciplinary Information Systems Engineering, which he founded and directed. While at Drexel University, with support from the Alfred P. Sloan Foundation, he designed and implemented the nation's first totally online Masters program in information systems (MSIS). The program was featured in the nationally broadcast PBS Special "net.learning." He was a Professor and Chairman of the Department of Information Systems & Systems Engineering at George Mason University where he held the George Mason Institute Endowed Chair. The ISSE department was home to 30 professors and had an annual external sponsored research budget of over $5 million. Several research centers were established in the department during this time including the Center for Computer Security, the Center for Software Engineering and the Center for Command, Control, Communications & Intelligence (C4I).

Andriole is currently the (tenured, full) Thomas G. Labrecque Professor of Business Technology at the Villanova School of Business, where he teaches in the undergraduate and MBA programs. He teaches Emerging Business Technologies, Technology as a Strategic Lever, Strategic Information Technology, Artificial Intelligence/Machine Learning/Generative AI for Business and Innovation & Entrepreneurialism.^{[2]}His research focuses on digital technology optimization, technology management, technology adoption, and how emerging technology can modify or replace business processes and whole business models.

== Author ==
Andriole was a monthly columnist for Datamation Magazine on business technology convergence for nearly a decade. Andriole was featured in Business Insider and Region's Business IT's All About the People was named the No. 4 Best Book in IT-Business for 2011 by CIO Insight Magazine. He is a contributor to Forbes Magazine where publishes on all things digital. In addition to his books, he has recently published in the MIT Sloan Management Review, the Communications of the ACM, the Communications of the AIS, the California Management Review, IEEE IT Professional, and other academic and applied journals and magazines.

== Education ==
Andriole received his BA from La Salle University and Masters and Doctorate degrees from the University of Maryland which were supported by a National Defense Education Act Fellowship. His PhD dissertation was funded by DARPA. He received an Honorary Doctorate from LaSalle University in 2000.

== Published books ==
- (2025) Start-Ups Declassified: An Insider's Playbook for Success (Business Expert Press)
- (2023) The Digital Playbook: How to Leverage Strategic Technology for Competitive Advantage (Pearson/Financial Times) ISBN 9781292443065
- (2017) The Innovator’s Imperative: Rapid Technology Adoption for Digital Transformation (co-author, Taylor & Francis/CRC Press, 2017) – ISBN 978-1-1387-1355-0
- (2014) Ready Technology: Fast-Tracking New Business Technologies (Auerbach Publishing/Taylor & Francis, 2014) – ISBN 978-1482255768
- (2013) Avoiding #Fail: Mitigating Risk, Managing Threats & Protecting the Corporation in the Age of Social Media (co-author, Ascendigm Press, 2013)
- (2013) Social Business Intelligence: Why Every Company Needs Social Media (co-author, Ascendigm Press, 2013) – ISBN 098873110X
- (2011) IT's All About the People (Auerbach Publishing, 2011; Winner of CIO Insight's Best Business – IT Books for 2011: #4) – ISBN 978-1439876589
- (2009) Best Practices in Business Technology Management, Publisher - Auerbach Publishing, 2009 - ISBN 9781420063332
- (2006) Business Technology Decision Making Publisher: Auerbach Publishing - ISBN 9781605660189
- (2005) How We Know What to Do: The Art, Science & Magic of Technology Due Diligence Publisher: Wharton School Publishing - ISBN 9781605660189
- (2005) The 2nd Digital Revolution: Conversations About Business Technology Convergence Publisher: IGI Publishing Group – ISBN 0330234226
- (1996) Managing Systems Requirements: Methods, Tools & Cases Publisher: McGraw Hill – ISBN 0330234226
- (1995) Cognitive Systems Engineering (Co-author) Publisher: CRC Press – ISBN 9780805812442
- (1993) Sourcebook of Applied Artificial Intelligence (Co-editor and Co-author) Publisher: McGraw Hill – ISBN 0830682635
- (1993) Rapid Application Prototyping Storyboard Requirements: The Storyboard Approach to User Requirements Analysis Publisher: John Wiley & Sons Canada Ltd. – ISBN 9780471556305
- (1991) Information Technology for Command and Control (Co-editor and Co- author) Publisher: IEEE Press – ISBN 9780879422707
- (1990) Advanced Technology for Command and Control (C2) Systems Engineering (Editor and Co-Author) Publisher: AFCEA International Press – ISBN 9780916159221
- (1990) Information System Design Principles for the 90s Publisher: AFCEA International Press – ISBN 9780916159207
- (1989) Storyboard Prototyping: A New Approach to User Requirements Analysis Publisher: QED Information Sciences Inc. – ISBN 9780894352461
- (1989) Handbook for Decision Support Systems Publisher: TAB Books Inc. - ISBN 0830632409
- (1988) Defense Applications Artificial Intelligence (Co-editor and Co-author) Publisher: Lexington Books / D.C. Health and Company – ISBN 0330234226
- (1987) Artificial Intelligence and National Defense: Applications to C^{3}I and Beyond (Editor and Co-author), AFCEA International Press, 1987
- (1987) Principles of Command and Control, Miami University Ohio - Publisher: AFCEA International Press – ISBN 0330234226
- (1986) Software Development Tools: A Resource Guide (Editor) – Publisher: Petrocelli Books Inc – ISBN 978-0-89433-272-2
- (1986) High Technology Initiatives in Command, Control, Communications, and intelligence (C3I): Communications, Artificial Intelligence, and Strategic Defense (Editor and Co-Author)- Publisher: AFCEA International Press – Harvard Course; ISP 483, Fall 2009
- (1986) Software Validation, Verification, Testing, and Documentation (Editor), Petrocelli Books
- (1986) Microcomputer Decision Support Systems: Design, Implementation, and Evaluation – Publisher: John & Sons Inc. – ISBN 9780894351730
- (1985)The Future of Information Processing Technology (Editor), Petrocelli Books
- (1985) Applications in Artificial Intelligence (Editor and Co-Author) - Publisher: Petrocelli Books Inc - ISBN 9780894332197
- (1985) Corporate Crisis Management (Editor and Co-Author) - Publisher: Petrocelli Books Inc - ISBN 0894332163
- (1984) Methods for Intelligence Analysis, Production, and Presentation – Publisher: Defense Intelligence College Press OCLC: 28996386
- (1984) Revolution and Political Instability: Applied Research Methods (Co-Author) - Publisher: Frances Pinter / St. Martin's Press – ISBN 9780861874712
- (1984) National Security Crisis Forecasting and Management – Publisher: Westview Press – ISBN 9780865319134
- (1984) Computer-Based National Information Systems (Editor), Petrocelli Books, Inc., 1984 – ISBN 9780894332470
- (1983) Interactive Computer Based System Design and Development - Publisher: Petrocelli Books Inc - ISBN 9780894331916
- (1983) The Handbook of Problem-Solving: Analytical Methodology - Publisher: Petrocelli Books Inc - ISBN 0894331868
- (1980) Foreign Policy Behavior: The interstate Behavior Analysis Model (Co-Author) Publisher: SAGE Publications – ISBN 9780803914766
