= How Civil Wars Start =

2022 book by Barbara F. Walter

How Civil Wars Start: And How to Stop Them
- Author: Barbara F. Walter
- Language: English
- Publisher: Crown
- Publication date: 2022
- Publication place: United States
- Pages: 320 pages
- ISBN: 978-0-593-13778-9

How Civil Wars Start: And How to Stop Them is a book by Barbara F. Walter, published in 2022. It posits that domestic conflicts are likely to arise in both anocratic countries (countries she defines as neither democratic nor autocratic) and countries with identitarian politics.

== Background ==
Barbara F. Walter is a professor of international relations at the University of California, San Diego. She wrote in the book that she initially began pondering the concept of an impending civil war in 2018, during Donald Trump's tenure as president of the United States, but her viewpoint was not entertained by her colleagues at the time.

== Synopsis ==
Walter argues that the United States is in danger of becoming an autocracy, although she does not expect a conflict in the United States like the American Civil War in terms of scale. In comparison, she analyzes the circumstances that led to the conflicts in Yugoslavia, the Philippines, and Iraq. Walter also analyzes the democracy of the United States through a "polity index"; this is a scale from -10 to +10, where -10 is an autocracy and +10 is a democracy. According to Walter, the U.S. has gone from +10 a few years before the book was written to +5 when it was published, making the current United States an anocracy—a partial democracy. She pictures a scene that would occur in 2028, in which wildfires burn in California and bombs are set off nationwide.

Walter writes about the impact of social media on tensions in the United States, arguing that it unites extremists and creates division. She also talks about "ethnic entrepreneurs", who gain following by exploiting cultural and ethnic tensions.

== Reaction ==
Writing for The New York Times, Jennifer Szalai called the book's advice "well-meaning but insufficient", although she also commented that given the scenarios Walter describes, this might be understandable; she thought that several pieces of guidance the book gave, such as "The U.S. government shouldn't indulge extremists", were rather obvious. She also referred to the future civil war scene as "fear-mongering", but said that if Walter is analyzing and interpreting present circumstances correctly, the scene might be a responsible warning. Szalai commented that the rating scale gave Walter a rational way to justify "blunt conclusions", such as the idea that "the Republican Party is behaving like a predatory faction".

== See also ==
- The Next Civil War: Dispatches from the American Future
- Robert Evans (journalist)
