= The Next Civil War =

2022 non-fiction book by Stephen Marche

The Next Civil War: Dispatches from the American Future
- Author: Stephen Marche
- Language: English
- Publisher: Avid Reader Press / Simon & Schuster
- Publication date: January 2022
- Publication place: Canada
- Pages: 238
- ISBN: 978-1982123215
- OCLC: 1259047240

The Next Civil War: Dispatches from the American Future is a 2022 non-fiction book by Canadian novelist and journalist Stephen Marche. Released one year after the January 6th attack on the US Capitol, the book offers five possible scenarios in which a civil war could get triggered, resulting in a right-wing dictatorship in the US within the next decade.

== Premise ==
The book is based on "sophisticated predictive models and nearly two hundred interviews with experts – civil war scholars, military leaders, law enforcement officials, secret service agents, agricultural specialists, environmentalists, war historians, and political scientists". Marche drew up his five scenarios after consulting with counterinsurgency specialists who had studied what it would take to control a US population embroiled in civil conflict.

== Background ==
In November 2018, Stephen Marche published an article entitled "America's Next Civil War" in the Canadian magazine, The Walrus. In it he explained, as a Canadian who had lived and worked in the US, how such a war would affect his native country. He wrote, "Figuring out what will happen there means figuring out what we will eventually face here." Three years later, he expanded the article into book form in The Next Civil War: Dispatches from the American Future.

== Synopsis ==
The book begins by summarizing the deep political polarization in the United States which the author argues has gripped the US, and his predictions where this polarization might lead. Referring to the presence of armed militias at state capitols during the COVID lockdowns, as well as the January 6th insurrection—with its deputization of troops in Washington, D.C., right-wing attacks on law enforcement and elected officials, and the disruption of the peaceful transition of power—Marche writes that if you had read about those occurrences in another country, "you would think a civil war had already begun." He asserts that conditions exist for a political crisis to commence in the US, in fact, he believes "the crisis has already arrived. Only the inciting incidents are pending."

To that end, he imagines five possible civil conflict scenarios, each initiated by a triggering event:

a violent confrontation between the federal government and a posse of far-right militias, the assassination of a Democratic president, the destruction of New York City in a super hurricane, the detonation of a dirty bomb in Washington DC, and the relatively peaceful secession of states that have realized their cultural and political differences outweigh their shared history.

He then uses his skills as a novelist to narrate how each subsequent story might unfold.

Marche traces the potential for civil strife in the US all the way back to the country's founding. He claims that America's toleration of partisan differences contains an inherent vulnerability which has always been lurking:

Difference is the core of the American experience. Difference is its genius. There has never been a country—in history, in the world—so comfortable with difference, so full of difference. The great insight of its founders was that they based government not on the drive toward consensus but on the permission for disagreement.

He warns, however, that "Once partisan drive takes precedence over the national interest, it shreds the tension underlying the system. Unless both sides believe that they're on the same side, they aren't. And once shared purpose disappears, it's gone. A flaw lurked right at the core of the experiment, as flaws so often do in works of ambitious genius." He anticipates a dangerous juncture in the future when millions of citizens will become disillusioned with the experiment: "they don't want America's differences. They can no longer tolerate America's contradictions."

Marche criticizes Democrats for not recognizing the peril the country faces: "After the Trump years, the Democrats have attempted to salve the wounds inflicted on American institutions, but they remain overwhelmingly committed to the old ways, to the United States they grew up in." He adds:

Joe Biden's victory speech in the 2020 election announced "a time to heal." It was wishful thinking. Even as the president-elect tried to gesture toward reconciliation, the sitting president wouldn't concede. American liberals in the major cities retain a kind of desperate faith in their country's institutions that amounts nearly to delusion.

== Reception ==
In the Chicago Review of Books, Ed Simon agreed with Marche's criticism of American liberals for not exhibiting a sufficient level of alarm. Kirkus Reviews wrote that "Lincoln wouldn't have liked Marche's proposed remedies, but in a time of torment, this is a book well worth reading."

In the Toronto Star, Steven W. Beattie noted how Marche confronted a dilemma "that anyone trying to write a book-length study of our current moment must confront: the plain fact that history is galloping too quickly to even attempt a long view. By the time a book is printed, the situation on the ground will have changed beyond all recognition." Nonetheless, Beattie praised Marche's effort to forecast where America might be headed.

In The New York Times Book Review, Ian Bassin said the narratives in The Next Civil War deliver "Cormac McCarthy-worthy drama; while the nonfictional asides imbue that drama with the authority of documentary." But Bassin faulted Marche for being "negative to the last and therefore fails to capture the full complexity of our moment."

Fintan O'Toole, writing for The Atlantic, strongly criticized the book. According to him, the author was promoting a doomsday mentality which would only contribute to further partisanship and possible violence, as was the case in Northern Ireland during The Troubles.

In The Washington Post, Carlos Lozada wrote:

Marche oscillates between certitude about a coming civil war (we are already on its "threshold," he warns, and any catalyzing event will appear "a logical outcome to the trends of the country") and the belief that we can avoid it ("none of the crises described in this book are beyond the capacity of Americans to solve," he writes, as long as we recapture the spirit of a country "devoted to reinvention"). Marche's final two chapters are titled "The End of the Republic" and "A Note on American Hope." When you're betting on the end of the American experiment, a little hedge doesn't hurt.

== See also ==
- How Civil Wars Start
