= National Law School of Delhi =

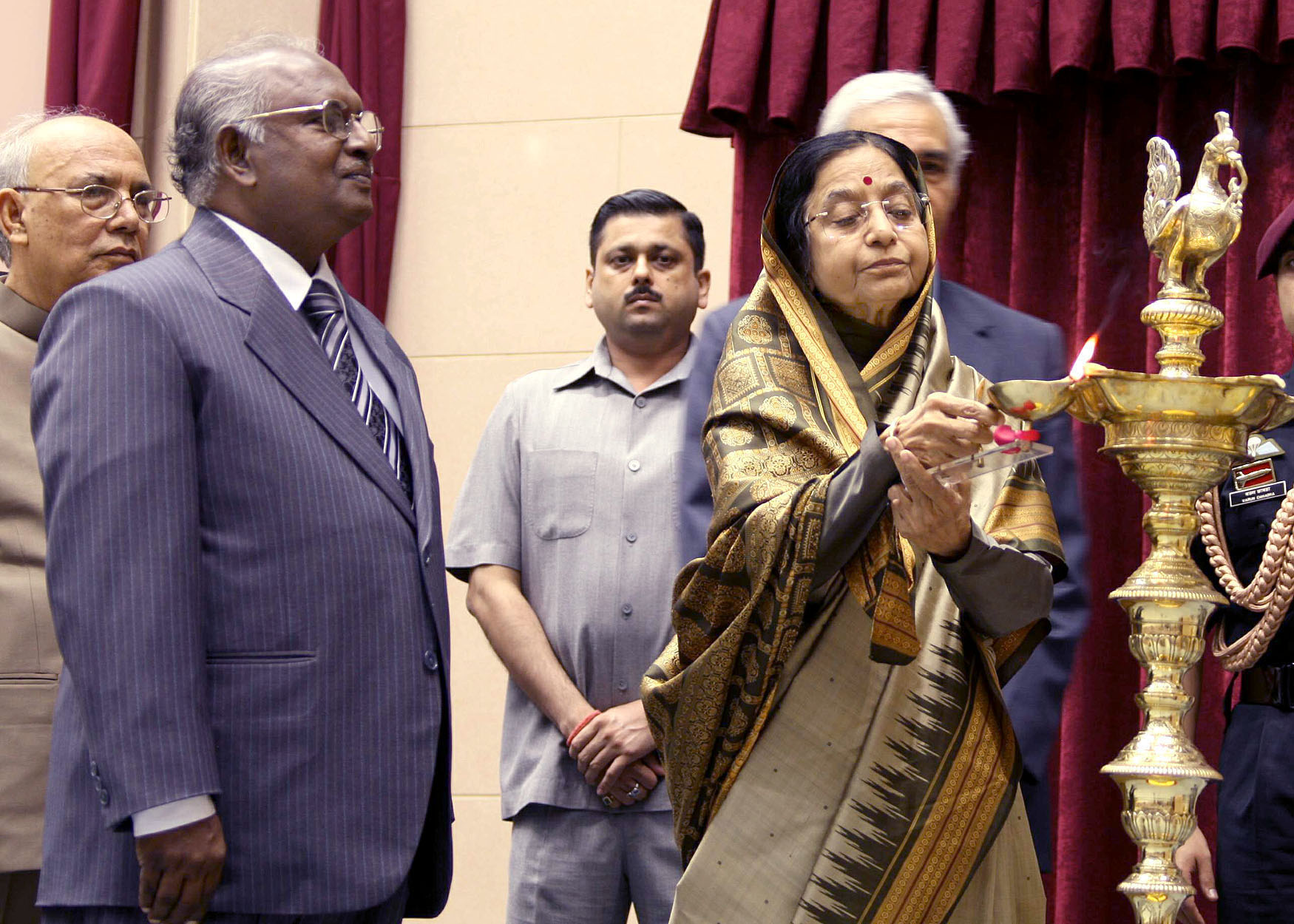
The President, Smt. Pratibha Devisingh Patil lighting the lamp to inaugurate the National Law School of Delhi University, in New Delhi on September 03, 2008

National Law School of Delhi, established in 2008 by Act 1 of 2008 of National Capital Territory of Delhi, is a law university in India. The university is at Sector 14, Dwarka, New Delhi.
