= Michael Brecher =

Canadian political scientist (1925–2022)

Michael Brecher (14 March 1925 – 16 January 2022) was a Canadian political scientist and teacher in Quebec.

== Life and career ==
Brecher was born on 14 March 1925 to a Jewish family. He obtained his PhD in International Relations from Yale University in 1953, and joined the faculty of McGill University in 1954. He was R.B. Angus Professor of Political Science at McGill University until his retirement. His areas of research included; theory of crisis, conflict and war, protracted conflicts/enduring rivalries, foreign policy theory, international systems, the Middle East and South Asia international relations. He founded the Shastri Indo-Canadian Institute to promote cultural and research exchanges between Canada and India.

He retired after 69 years, thereafter becoming R.B. Angus Professor of Political Science Emeritus, and a member of the Royal Society of Canada. Brecher died on 16 January 2022, at the age of 96.

== Selected publications ==
=== Books ===
- The Struggle for Kashmir, Oxford University Press, 1953.
- Nehru: A Political Biography, Oxford University Press, 1959 & 2005.
- Israel, the Korean War and China, 1974.
- Crises in World Politics: Theory and Reality, Pergamon Press, 1993.
- A Study of Crisis, with Jonathan Wilkenfeld, University of Michigan Press, 1997.
- International Political Earthquakes, University of Michigan Press, 2008.
- The World of Protracted Conflicts, Rowman and Littlefield Lexington Books, 2016.
- Political Leadership and Charisma: Nehru, Ben-Gurion, and Other 20th Century Political Leaders, Palgrave-Macmillan, 2016.
- Dynamics of the Arab-Israel Conflict: Past and Present, Palgrave-Macmillan, 2017
- A Century of Crisis and Conflict in the International System: Theory and Evidence, Palgrave-Macmillan, 2017.

=== Edited collections ===
- Crisis in the Twentieth Century, co-edited with Jonathan Wilkenfeld, (3 volumes), 1988, 1989.
- Millennial Reflections on International Studies, editor, with Frank P. Harvey, Ann Arbor, MI: University of Michigan Press, 2002 (5 volumes)

== Reception ==
A review of Brecher's biography of Nehru called this book 'substantial, scholarly... the best single work available at present on this subject.'

M. A. C. observes in Pakistan Horizon that Brecher's book, The Struggle for Kashmir, is a "painstaking but not a balanced study". The reviewer points out that there are examples of facts being misrepresented to Pakistan's disadvantage. Holden Furber calls it a careful study based on relevant published materials. But despite that Furber comments that Brecher's approach lacks ground research and he is more a scholar who has lived among United Nations reports in libraries. Percival Spears sees that Brecher tends to too readily accept Indian arguments for Kashmir and Junagadh and relies on Alan Campbell Johnson who is seen as prejudiced in Pakistan. Spear also observes that Brecher has a tendency to readily accept Indian reasons for rejecting each proposal in the discussions on conditions for plebiscite and also a tendency to underrate the importance of the Pakistani acceptances of proposals made through January 1951 to the Graham negotiations.

== Honours and awards ==
- 1959 - Watumull prize of the American Historical Association for his biography of Jawaharlal Nehru
- 1964 - Rockefeller Foundation scholarship
- 1965 - John Simon Guggenheim Fellowship
- 1970 and 1976- Killam scholarship
- 1986 - Fieldhouse Prize from McGill University for excellence in research
- 1999–2000, President, International Studies Association
- 2000, Leon-Gerin Quebec Prize for the Human Sciences
- 2000, Award for High Distinction in Research, McGill University
- 2009, Lifetime Achievement Award, American Political Science Association (Conflict Processes)
