= Joseph D. McBride =

American lawyer

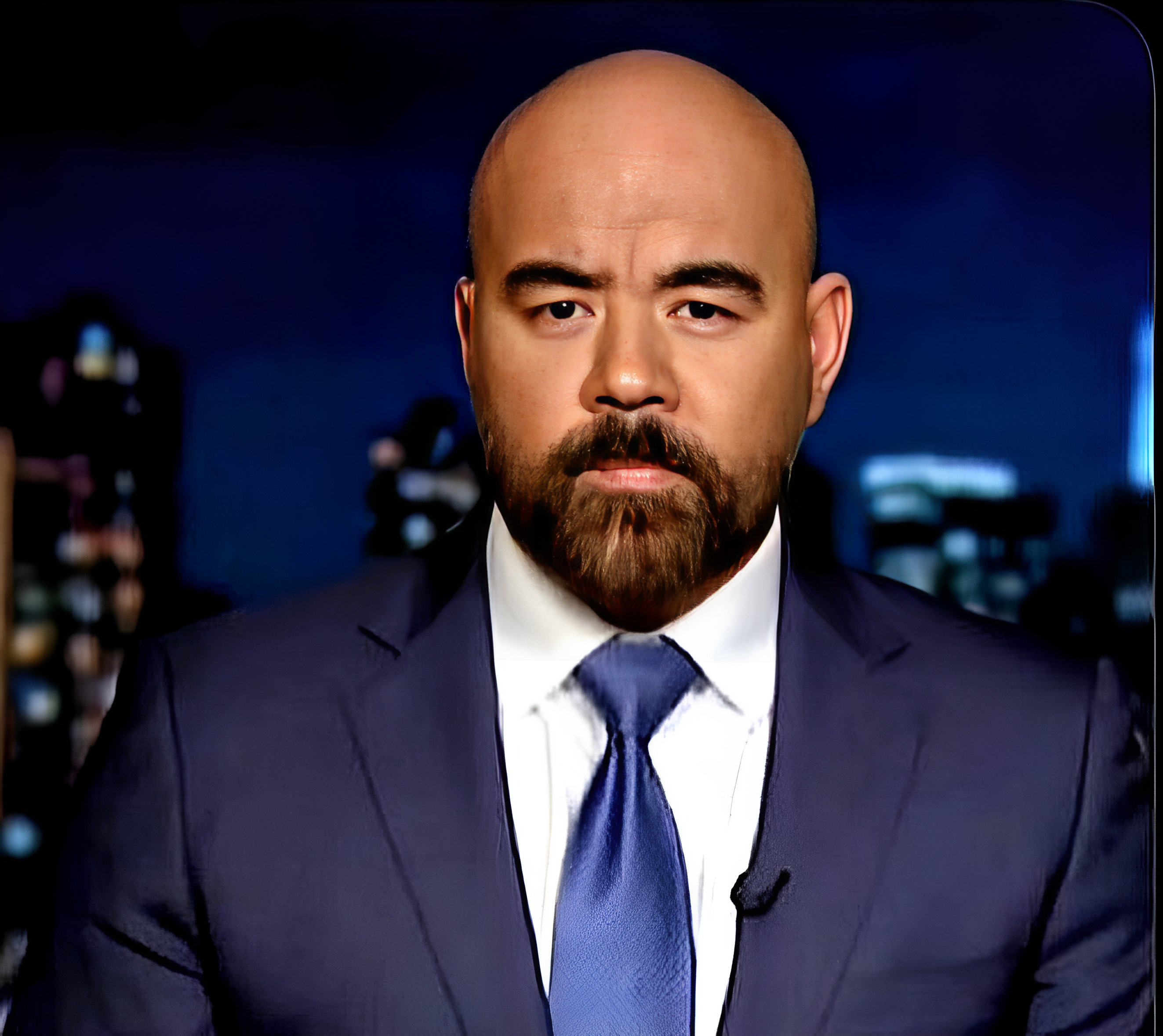
- Born: June 30, 1978 (age 48)
- Education: John Jay College of Criminal Justice (BA); Yeshiva University (JD)
- Employer(s): The McBride Law Firm, PLLC
- Known for: Operating the January 6th Legal Fund, representing Richard Barnett, representing the Tate brothers
- Website: The McBride Law Firm

Joseph Daniel McBride (born June 30, 1978) is an American criminal defense and civil litigator, media personality, and international consultant. He founded The McBride Law Firm in 2019 and is widely known for his representation of Andrew Tate and those charged during the January 6 United States Capitol attack, including Richard Barnett.

Raised in Mastic, New York, McBride graduated from William Floyd High School in 1997, then law school in 2014 and spent several years in Manhattan representing defendants as a legal aid attorney. Following the January 6 Capitol attack, he represented a number of those involved in the event, and appeared on behalf of U.S. House Select Committee witnesses.

He has worked as an attorney and counselor at his New York City law firm since 2019.

== Early life and education ==
McBride was educated at the John Jay College of Criminal Justice where he graduated with a political science and history degree in 2011. He graduated from the Benjamin N. Cardozo School of Law at Yeshiva University with a J.D. in 2014.

According to McBride, he was inspired to become a lawyer after his adopted brother, Anthony, was pressured into pleading guilty or facing 10 years imprisonment for a crime he claims his brother did not commit.

== Career ==
McBride founded The McBride Law Firm, PLLC, and has served as an attorney and counselor at the firm since 2019. He also received the Avvo Client's Choice Award in 2019. In addition, he is a partner at Power Dynamic Strategies (PDS), a US-based consulting firm with a significant presence in the United Arab Emirates.

=== January 6 clients: DOJ prosecutions ===
==== Richard Barnett ====
McBride became an advocate for those charged during the January 6 Capitol attack. He also operates the January 6th Legal Fund for the legal needs of his clients involved in the events of January 6. McBride took Richard "Bigo" Barnett as his client, an Arkansas window installer who put his feet on a desk in the office of Speaker of the House Nancy Pelosi on January 6, 2021. In April 2021, a judge released Barnett from pretrial detention, deeming him not dangerous enough to remain in jail; this followed a federal appeals court ruling in March that made it harder for the Department of Justice to keep those not accused of assault or planning an attack to stay imprisoned.

In March 2021, after an incident at a virtual hearing with U.S. District Court Judge Christopher R. Cooper in which Barnett became frustrated because of his pretrial detention, McBride defended his client in a statement to NBC News: "Mr. Barnett's frustration stems from the fact that he is incarcerated pre-trial, despite lacking any criminal history...Normally, facts like these are more than enough for an individual to fight their case from the outside."

Barnett was eventually found guilty of all charges and was sentenced to serve 54 months in prison.

==== Ryan Nichols ====
McBride also represented January 6 defendant Ryan Nichols, who was released from pretrial detention by U.S. District Court Judge Thomas Hogan in November 2022 after 20 months of imprisonment. McBride had spent months filing motions for Nichols' release from pretrial detention, and complained that officials at a correctional facility in Washington, D.C. had stolen a thumb drive containing attorney-client privileged information, a claim contested by Judge Hogan. However, Hogan concluded that Nichols had issues with access to discovery, and that the facility holding him in Rappahannock, Virginia was not suited for the large amount of digital video evidence he had to review for his trial, and agreed to release him.

Nichols was eventually found guilty of all charges and sentenced to serve 63 months in prison.

==== Christopher Quaglin ====
In March 2023, U.S. District Court Judge Trevor McFadden claimed that McBride had misled the court during the trial of January 6 defendant Christopher Quaglin about the qualifications of another lawyer to whom he was transferring the case. However, McFadden declined to discipline McBride, and only admonished him with a statement. In April 2022, Quaglin had filed a petition for a writ of habeas corpus, claiming that U.S. Attorney General Merrick Garland and jail superintendent Ted Hull treated him with "malicious indifference." As reported in Law & Crime that month, McBride noted that since Quaglin's arrest a year prior he had been transferred to half a dozen different facilities, and said: "The intensity and duration of his mistreatment grows worse with each transfer."

Quaglin was eventually found guilty and sentenced to 144 months in prison.

=== January 6 clients: Select Committee ===
McBride also appeared on behalf of January 6 select committee witnesses Alexander Bruesewitz and Ali Alexander, as reported by Politico in January 2023.

=== Keith Raniere ===
"There is a system of laws and procedures set in place and if somebody's going to lose their trial, it's got to be a fair trial. They've got to lose on the facts, by the rules."

— Joseph D. McBride, 2021

McBride worked as a defense attorney on the legal team of NXIVM sex cult leader Keith Raniere.

On October 27, 2020, Judge Nicholas Garaufis sentenced Raniere to 120 years incarceration and a $1.75 million fine.

In 2021, before Raniere's appeal to the U.S. Second Circuit Court of Appeals, McBride expressed concern with how the FBI was handling the case. In a February 18, 2021 appearance on the Law & Crime Network, he said: "We have a lot of questions about the FBI's work in this case. People here were hurt on some level but the question...is about proving each element of each crime beyond a reasonable doubt. We don't think that the government did that in this case."

McBride also spoke to Channel 13 news in Tucson, Arizona about the case in February 2021, stating: "There is a system of laws and procedures set in place and if somebody's going to lose their trial, it's got to be a fair trial. They've got to lose on the facts, by the rules."

== Views ==
McBride was described by the Washington Examiner as a supporter of Donald Trump. He has accused the FBI of discriminating against Catholics and compared defendants accused of crimes during the January 6 attack to Jesus. From January 3 to 5, 2023, McBride undertook a three-day fast on behalf of the January 6 detainees. excommunicated Catholic ex-Archbishop Carlo Maria Viganò sent McBride a letter voicing support for the fast and stating: "I can only encourage and bless this commendable gesture of penance."

McBride is anti-abortion and voiced strong support for the U.S. Supreme Court Dobbs v. Jackson decision in June 2022.

In May 2022, he spoke against prolonged solitary confinement on his Twitter account, stating that it "violates a prisoner's human rights every time it is used," and thanked U.S. Congressman Louie Gohmert for opposing the punishment of January 6 detainees during pretrial confinement.

== Media ==
McBride has appeared on Fox News, Newsmax, and One America News, among other outlets. He was featured on Part 3 of Tucker Carlson's Patriot Purge, a three-part series that concluded in November 2021. On March 9, 2023, McBride appeared with Donald Trump Jr. on an episode of Trump's online video series Triggered. While appearing on Tucker Carlson's program, McBride said that a man whose face was obscured by red paint at the January 6 attack was "clearly a law enforcement officer"; a HuffPost reporter later produced evidence showing the man to be fan of the St. Louis Cardinals.

McBride hosts a YouTube channel titled "Judgment Day With Joe McBride." He claims that someone attempted to assassinate him for his role representing January 6 defendants by remotely taking control of his 2020 BMW X5 M-Sport and attempting to cause him to crash at high speed. He additionally claims that in the aftermath of this assassination attempt, his 2020 BMW X5 M-Sport would only drive in reverse, and that he drove from the Fort McHenry Tunnel to Washington D.C. (approximately 39 miles) in reverse.

He additionally claims that he simultaneously experienced Lyme Disease, Rocky Mountain Spotted Fever, the Epstein-Barr virus, and long COVID after being vaccinated for COVID-19.
