= Timeline of activities involving the Proud Boys =

Far-right and neo-fascist male-only organization

Since its foundation in 2016, members of the Proud Boys, a far-right, neo-fascist, and exclusively male organization, have been involved in a number of controversial and violent events. This list contains a number of those events, some of which have resulted in criminal charges being filed against participants.

== 2017–2018 ==
=== New York University ===
In February 2017, Proud Boys founder Gavin McInnes arrived at New York University to give a speech, accompanied by a group of about ten Proud Boys. Minor scuffles broke out between the Proud Boys and antifa protesters, and the NYPD said that eleven people faced criminal charges. One member of the Proud Boys who encouraged others to fight the "faggots wearing black that won't let us in" was later arrested for punching a reporter from DNAinfo.

=== Berkeley protests ===
At the 2017 March 4 Trump rally in Berkeley, California, Kyle Chapman was recorded hitting a counter-protester over the head with a wooden dowel. Images of Chapman went viral, and the Proud Boys organized a crowdfunding campaign for Chapman's bail after his arrest. After this, McInnes invited Chapman to become involved with the Proud Boys, through which he formed the Fraternal Order of the Alt-Knights.

On April 15, 2017, an alt-right rally was organized in Berkeley by the Liberty Revival Alliance, which did not seek or receive a permit, and was attended by members of the Proud Boys, Identity Evropa (an American neo-Nazi group) and Oath Keepers (an anti-government far-right group). Many of these people traveled to Berkeley from other parts of the country and the rally was counter-protested and violence broke out, resulting in 21 people being arrested.

=== Halifax Indigenous Peoples' protest disruption ===
External video 2:29
- Who are the Proud Boys? on YouTube (CBC News) July 5, 2017

On July 1, 2017, five Canadian Armed Forces (CAF) members who self-identified as Proud Boys disrupted a protest organized by indigenous activists in Halifax, Nova Scotia, at a statue of Edward Cornwallis, the first Lieutenant-Governor of Nova Scotia. Indigenous activists had previously protested at the site and called for the removal of the statue because of Cornwallis's actions against Natives, including ordering a bounty for scalps of Mi'kmaq people. The Proud Boys carried the Canadian Red Ensign flag from the time of Cornwallis and one of them said to the indigenous protesters: "You are recognising your heritage and so are we."

General Jonathan Vance, the head of the CAF, announced an investigation, Rear Admiral John Newton, Commander of the Maritime Fleet of the Royal Canadian Navy, was "personally horrified" by the incident and said the Proud Boys were "clearly a white supremacist group and we fundamentally stand opposed to any of their values." The CAF's investigation concluded by August 2017. Later that month, Newton announced the CAF had taken "appropriate measures to address individual shortcomings" and that four of the members had returned to duty, warning: "Any further inappropriate behavior could result in their termination from the Canadian Armed Forces." In 2018, the statue was removed from the site by the City of Halifax.

=== Unite the Right rally ===
In June 2017, McInnes disavowed the planned Unite the Right rally in Charlottesville, Virginia. However, Proud Boys were at the August 2017 alt-right event, which was organized by white supremacist Jason Kessler. Kessler had joined the Proud Boys some time before organizing the event. McInnes said he had kicked Kessler out after his views on race had become clear. After the rally, Kessler accused McInnes of using him as a "patsy" and said: "You're trying to cuck and save your own ass." Alex Michael Ramos, one of the men convicted for the assault of DeAndre Harris which took place at the rally, was associated with the Proud Boys and Fraternal Order of Alt-Knights.

=== Islamberg caravan ===
In July 2017, the Proud Boys joined a caravan to ride through Islamberg, New York, a community of around twenty black Muslim families who moved upstate to escape the crime and racism of New York City, and which has been a target of conspiracy theories from various Islamophobic hate groups and right-wing terrorist plots.

=== Pacific Northwest protests ===
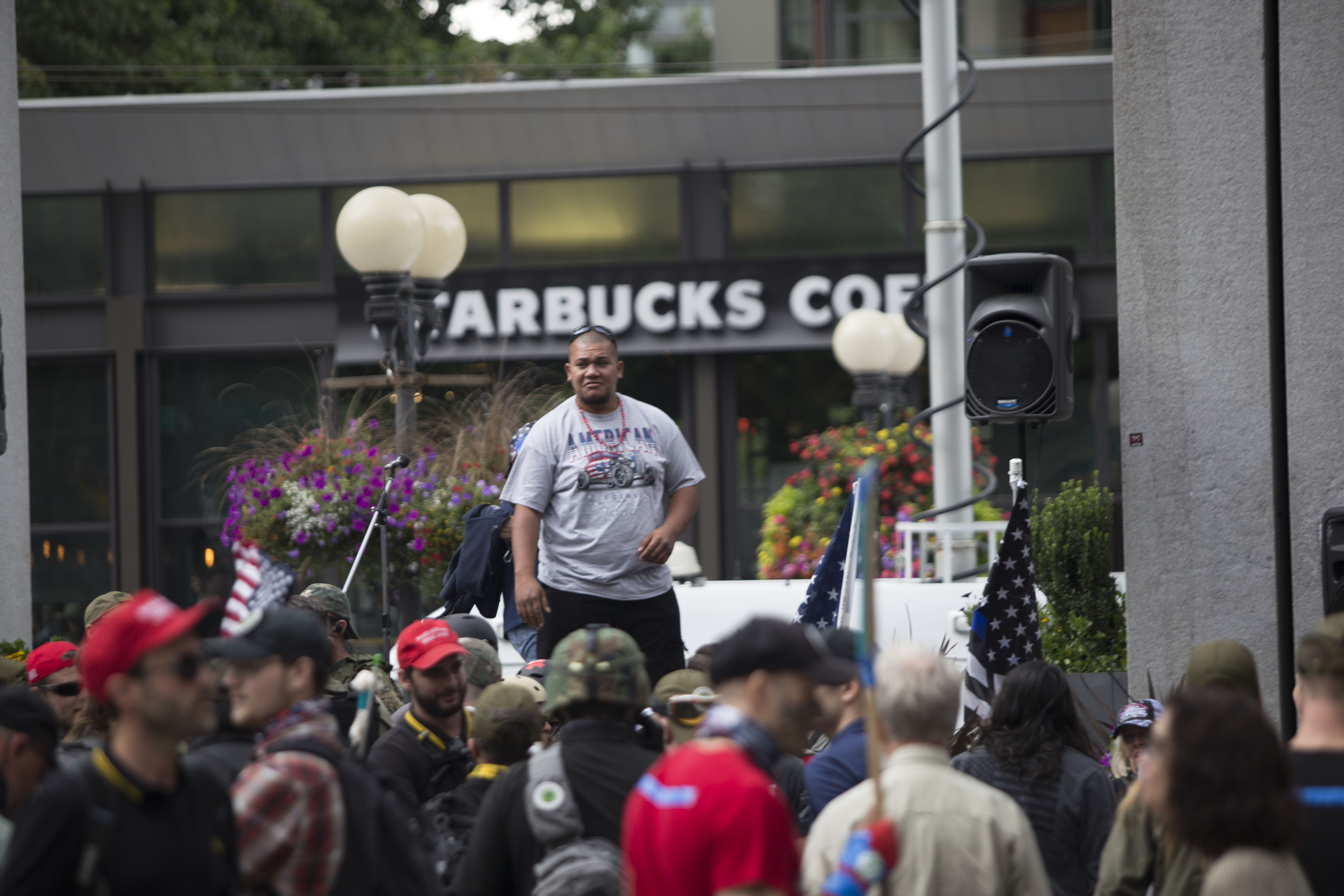
Tusitala "Tiny" Toese and Proud Boys in Seattle in 2017

The Proud Boys have been active for several years in the Pacific Northwest of the United States. Starting in September 2017 and continuing into 2018, the Proud Boys participated in several rallies organized by Patriot Prayer in Portland, Oregon, and nearby Vancouver, Washington. Scenes of violence from one of these rallies was turned into a sizzle reel for the Proud Boys and was circulated on social media. Violence erupted at two events in June 2018, leaving five people hospitalized after the far-right march on June 30 devolved into a riot in downtown Portland.

== 2018–2019 ==
=== Say No to Marxism rally ===
In August 2018, the Northern California Regional Intelligence Center (NCRIC) summarized a report about right-wing groups gathering weapons before a rally. The basis for the warning is a July call from a man to the Berkeley police department, expressing concern about someone he knew who allegedly was a member of the Proud Boys that was "gathering masks, helmets, and guns and would have absolute war with the liberals at an event scheduled to take place in Berkeley on August 5, 2018". On August 5, 2018, a Say No to Marxism rally in San Francisco organized by the Proud Boys and their allies resulted in their outnumbering by counter-protests.

=== Metropolitan Republican Club ===
In October 2018, McInnes gave a talk at the Metropolitan Republican Club on the Upper East Side of Manhattan. He stepped out of his car wearing glasses with Asian eyes drawn on the front and pulled a samurai sword out of its sheath. Police forced him inside. Later, inside the event, McInnes and an Asian member of the Proud Boys re-enacted the 1960 murder of Inejiro Asanuma, the leader of the Japanese Socialist Party; a captioned photograph of the actual murder had become a meme in alt-right social media. The audience for the event was described by The New York Times as "a cross-section of New York’s far-right subculture: libertarians, conspiracy theorists and nationalists who have coalesced around their opposition to Islam, feminism and liberal politics."

Anti-fascist activists had started protesting outside the club before the event and had reportedly engaged in vandalism. Following cross-provocations between the opposing sides, the Proud Boys charged towards the protesters, who threw a bottle in response, resulting in a fight. NYC police present at the protest reportedly did not respond.

On November 21, 2018, McInnes said that his lawyers had advised him that quitting might help the nine members being prosecuted for the incidents in October and he said "this is 100% a legal gesture, and it is 100% about alleviating sentencing", and said it was a "stepping down gesture, in quotation marks".

The fallout from the incident left the group in internal disarray. After McInnes nominally left the group, the "Elder Chapter" of the group reportedly assumed control. Jason Lee Van Dyke, the group's lawyer, was appointed as the chapter's chairman. Van Dyke was previously known for suing news media and anti-fascist activists for reporting on the group, and for making violent online threats with racist language. The group then publicly released its new bylaw online, with the names of its "Elder Chapter" members listed and redacted. The redaction was later discovered to be botched, as the list of names can be accessed by selecting over the black bar of the released document. A day later, the chapter announced that Van Dyke was no longer leader of the group, and Enrique Tarrio is the group's new chairman.

Video evidence from three separate videos showed conclusively that the Proud Boys had instigated the fight after the Metropolitan Republican Club event. John Miller, New York City's deputy police commissioner for intelligence and counterterrorism, said that "incidents like [the post-MRC fight] make it more likely" that the Proud Boys would be "higher on the radar" of authorities.

Ten men connected to the Proud Boys were arrested in connection with the October 2018 incident. Seven Proud Boys pleaded guilty to various charges including riot, disorderly conduct and attempted assault. Two of the men who accepted plea deals were sentenced to five days of community service and did not receive jail time. In August 2019, two of the Proud Boys, Maxwell Hare and John Kinsman, were convicted following a jury trial of attempted gang assault, attempted assault and riot; the jury deliberated a day and a half of deliberations before rejecting their claims of self-defense. Hare and Kinsman were each sentenced to four years in prison. The final defendant is awaiting trial.

The four anti-fascist victims of the beating are not cooperating with prosecutors, even to the extent of revealing their identities, and are known only as "Shaved Head", "Ponytail", "Khaki" and "Spiky Belt". Because of their non-cooperation, the Proud Boys could not be charged with assault—which requires evidence of injury—and were instead charged with riot and attempted assault, which merely require an attempt to cause injury. Without the victims to testify, the bulk of the evidence in the trial came from videos of the incident, including footage shot by a video documentarian, and video from security cameras.

=== Connection with Roger Stone ===
In early 2018, ahead of an appearance at the annual Republican Dorchester Conference in Salem, Oregon, Roger Stone sought out the Proud Boys to act as his "security" for the event; photos posted online showed Stone drinking with several Proud Boys.

In February 2018, the Proud Boys posted a video on Facebook which they described as Stone undergoing a "low-level initiation" into the group. As part of the initiation, Stone says "Hi, I'm Roger Stone. I'm a Western chauvinist. I refuse to apologize for creating the modern world", making him a "first-degree" member, which Kutner characterizes as being a "sympathizer". Stone denies being a member of the group. In July 2020, Facebook announced it had shut down the accounts and pages linked to Stone and Proud Boys. This network of over 100 Facebook and Instagram accounts spent more than $300,000 on ads to promote their posts and included false personas.

In late January 2019, when Stone was arrested by the FBI on seven criminal counts in connection with the Mueller investigation, Enrique Tarrio, the chairman of the Proud Boys, met Stone as he left the courthouse in Florida. Tarrio, who wore a "Roger Stone Did Nothing Wrong" T-shirt, sold by a company owned by Tarrio, told a local TV reporter that the indictment was nothing but "trumped-up charges", and was later seen visiting Stone's house. The next day, in Washington, D.C., a small number of Proud Boys demonstrated outside the courthouse where Stone pleaded not guilty to the charges, carrying "Roger Stone did nothing wrong" signs and others that promoted the InfoWars conspiracy website. The Proud Boys got into an argument with anti-Stone hecklers. Tarrio was later filmed behind President Donald Trump in February 2019, during a televised speech in Miami, where he was seen wearing the same message on a T-shirt.

Proud Boys founder Gavin McInnes said Stone was "one of the three approved media figures allowed to speak" about the group. When Stone was asked by a local reporter about the Proud Boys' claim that he had been initiated as a member of the group, he responded by calling the reporter a member of the Communist party. He is particularly close to the group's current leader Enrique Tarrio, who has commercially monetized his position.

The Washington Post reported in February 2021 that the FBI was investigating any role Stone might have had in influencing the Proud Boys and Oath Keepers in their participation in the 2021 storming of the United States Capitol.

=== Portland mayor threat ===
In January 2019, Reggie Axtell, a member of the Proud Boys, threatened Ted Wheeler, Portland, Oregon's Democratic mayor, in a Facebook video post. According to the Southern Poverty Law Center, Axtell said in the video that Wheeler's "days are fucking numbered ... I promise you this, Ted Wheeler: I'm coming for you, you little punk." Axtell also said that he would "unmask every [anti-fascist] son of a bitch that I come across", referring to a campaign initiated by Patriot Prayer leader Joey Gibson, Proud Boy Tusitala "Tiny" Toese and former Proud Boy Russell Schultz to tear off the bandanas of anti-fascist demonstrators and taking pictures of their faces, thereby "demasking" them. The announcement of the campaign came shortly after an altercation that took place when Proud Boys and Patriot Prayer members attempted and failed to invade a chapter meeting of the left-wing organization Democratic Socialists of America. The groups clashed with anti-fascist activists nearby after being denied entry to the meeting, and said that they had been attacked.

=== 1776.shop ===
In February 2019, Slate magazine reported that Square, Chase Paymentech, and PayPal had pulled their payment processing services from 1776.shop, an online far-right merchandise site associated with the Proud Boys. 1776.shop lists itself as a project of Fund the West LLC, a Miami business registered to Henry Tarrio. In the past, Enrique Tarrio, the chairman of Proud Boys, has said that he is the "business owner" of 1776.shop, raising the probability that "Henry Tarrio" and "Enrique Tarrio" are the same person. Henry Tarrio is also the registered owner of "Proudboys LLC", which uses the same address as Fund the West.

=== Menacing critics ===
In July 2019, it was reported that on several occasions Proud Boys had gone to the homes of their critics and menaced them. In June 2018, Vic Berger, who posts videos online mocking far-right figures, including Proud Boy founder Gavin McInnes, reported that he was visited at his home by a Proud Boy who told him: "You're really hurting the Proud Boys. You need to stop making these videos." Berger later said he had come into possession of an internal Proud Boy document which called for Proud Boys to find the addresses of their opponents and those of their relatives and "SHOW THEM THERE ARE CONSEQUENCES!!!"

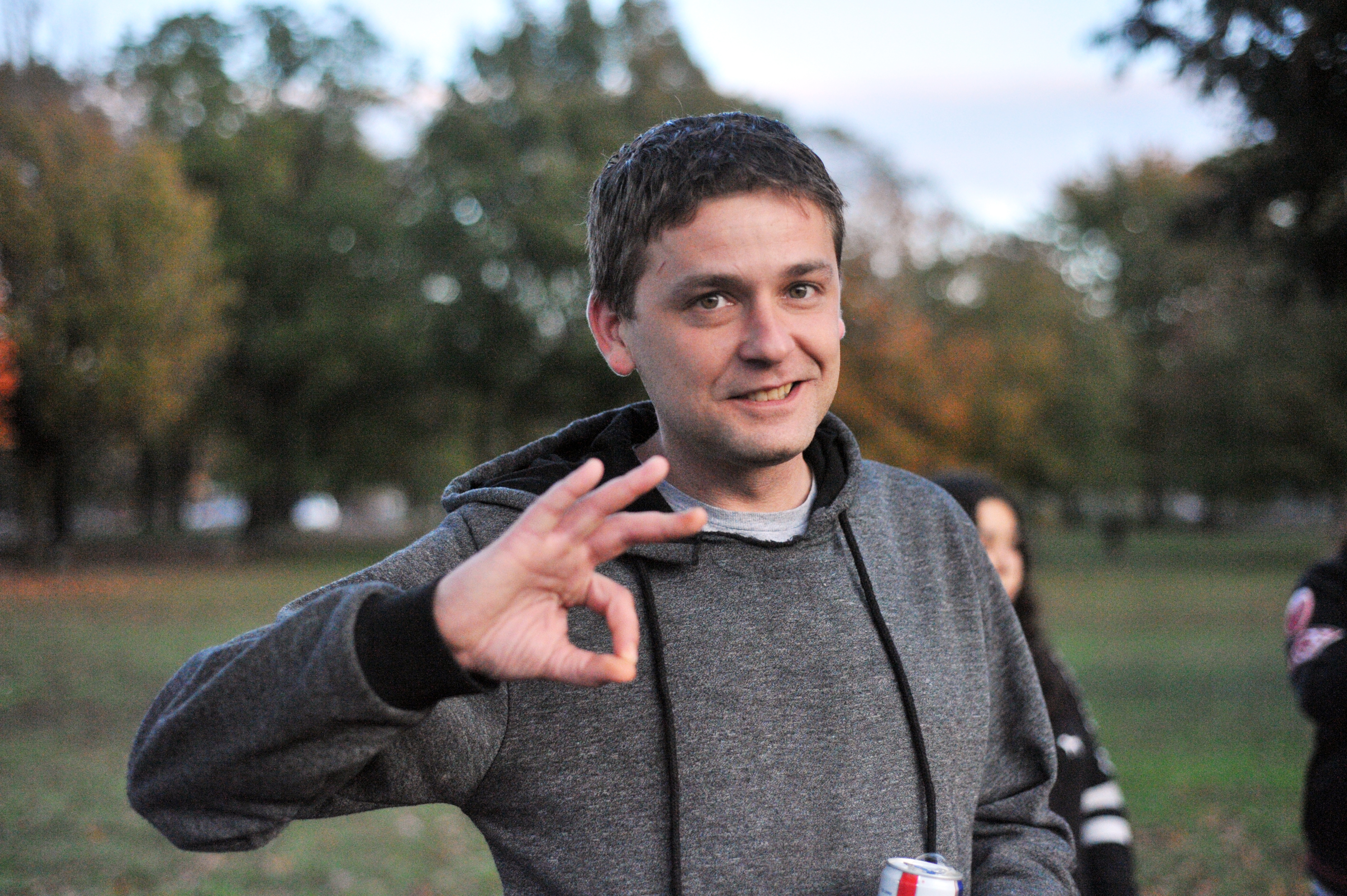
Zach Rehl, lead organizer of the Philadelphia Proud Boys, flashing a white-supremacist hand sign in November 2020

On June 29, 2019, a group of Proud Boys showed up at 11 p.m. at the Philadelphia home of Gwen Snyder, who tracks the movements of the Proud Boys. Snyder was not home at the time, so the group spoke to a neighbor, telling them that Snyder needed to stop posting on Twitter the names of Proud Boys and other information about them. One of the group allegedly said: "You tell that fat bitch she better stop." Snyder reported the threat to the Philadelphia police, giving them security camera footage of the incident. Prior to the menacing of Snyder, an anonymous Proud Boy posted on Telegram, a messaging app, a comment which called for action against "Philly's biggest shit stains."

=== Demand Free Speech rally ===
A Proud Boys rally called Demand Free Speech took place on July 6, 2019, in Washington, D.C.'s Freedom Plaza and Pershing Park, drawing about 250 people. McInnes, Laura Loomer and Milo Yiannopoulos appeared while former Trump advisor Roger Stone and Jacob Wohl did not. A counter-protest and dance party across the street drew more people than the main rally. Police said there were only minor skirmishes between the far-right and antifa, and no arrests were made. Republican candidate Omar Navarro, a perennial challenger for Democratic Congresswoman Maxine Waters' congressional seat, withdrew from speaking at the event, tweeting that his ex-girlfriend DeAnna Lorraine, a self-described "MAGA relationship expert", had threatened him, using cocaine and having sex with members of the Proud Boys. In response to Navarro's tweets, the Proud Boys issued a video featuring former InfoWars staff member Joe Biggs and Ethan Nordean—the star of a viral video showing him beating up an antifa protester—in which they "banished" Navarro from the Proud Boys. The Proud Boys' chairman Enrique Tarrio described the group as "pro-drugs". Other speakers who had been scheduled for the rally, including Pizzagate promoters Mike Cernovich and Jack Posobiec, had already cancelled their appearances for reasons not apparently related to Navarro's charges.

== 2019–2020 ==
=== Counter-terrorism and extremism intelligence reports ===
In 2019, the 22-page Violent Extremism in Colorado: a Reference Guide for Law Enforcement from the Colorado Information Analysis Center (the state's version of the DHS) and the Colorado Department of Public Safety was released, with the organizations discussing the Proud Boys under the "White Supremacist Extremism" heading. In coverage from The Guardian, it was reported that member organizations of the national network of counter-terrorist centers had issued warnings about the Proud Boys. Calling Proud Boys a "threat to Colorado", the guide related them to neo-Nazi terrorist group Atomwaffen Division and how violent clashes in 2018 with the Rocky Mountain Antifa ended in the arrest of two members of the Proud Boys. Guidance about the Proud Boys in the report involved describing them as "a dangerous white supremacist group", as a white supremacist extremist threat, and with a "concern that white supremacist extremists will continue attacking members of the community who threaten their belief of Caucasian superiority".

Also in 2019, the Austin Regional Intelligence Center (ARIC) compiled a Special Event Threat Assessment of potential dangers to the Austin Pride Parade. The ARIC identified the Proud Boys as being associated with a "growing backlash against Pride Month" which has emerged in the form of the straight pride movement, noting that a June 2019 transgender pride event in Seattle, Washington, was disrupted by the "alt-right Proud Boys organization".

=== Taunting soccer fans ===
After Major League Soccer (MLS) ruled that the Emerald City Supporters (ECS), the anti-fascist fans of the Seattle Sounders Football Club, could not fly the flag of the 1930s anti-Nazi Iron Front paramilitary group at Sounders' matches, eleven members of the Proud Boys met the group of about 100 people as they marched into the stadium on August 4, 2019, to taunt and yell expletives at them. There was additional police coverage, with the only incident occurring when the Proud Boys attempted to enter a bar which is a known place for ECS members to gather. The MLS had categorized the Iron Front flag as "political imagery", which was at that time forbidden under league rules. However, groups in Seattle and elsewhere challenged the ruling, which was reversed in September 2019 when the MLS reaffirmed "its long-time commitment to the values of inclusion and diversity, including opposition to racism, fascism and homophobia and to ensuring that there is no place for repugnant hate speech in MLS stadiums".

=== End Domestic Terrorism rally ===
The Proud Boys and Joe Biggs, a Florida-based radio talk show host and former InfoWars staff member, organized an August 17, 2019 demonstration in Portland attended by members of several far-right groups. The End Domestic Terrorism rally, which was sometimes subtitled "Better Dead than Red", was intended to promote the idea that antifa should be classified as "domestic terrorism". It received national attention, including a tweet from President Trump. One day prior to the rally, Patriot Prayer's Joey Gibson, who had organized similar events in 2017 and 2018, was taken into custody on charges of felony rioting during a May 1, 2019 incident. The Proud Boys organized the August event in response to a video that went viral of masked demonstrators assaulting conservative blogger Andy Ngo at a Portland rally on June 29, 2019. The End Domestic Terrorism event drew more counter-demonstrators than participants—with at least one group urging its members in advance not to attend—and ended with the Proud Boys requesting a police escort to leave.

=== Bon Air Fire Company ===
In September 2019, Haverford Township, Pennsylvania, announced that one of its volunteer fire companies, the Bon Air Fire Company, had been permanently relieved of duty at the end of business the previous day because of its unwillingness to dismiss a leader in the fire company, Bruce McClay Jr., who was in the "initiation" process of joining the Proud Boys; McClay had offered his resignation, but the fire company had declined to accept it. Four days after the township cut ties with the Bon Air Fire Company, the fire company reversed its decision and accepted McClay's resignation, saying its initial decision to refuse it was a "mistake"; this cleared the way for the township to re-open the company.

=== Anti-BLM protests and COVID-19 misinformation ===
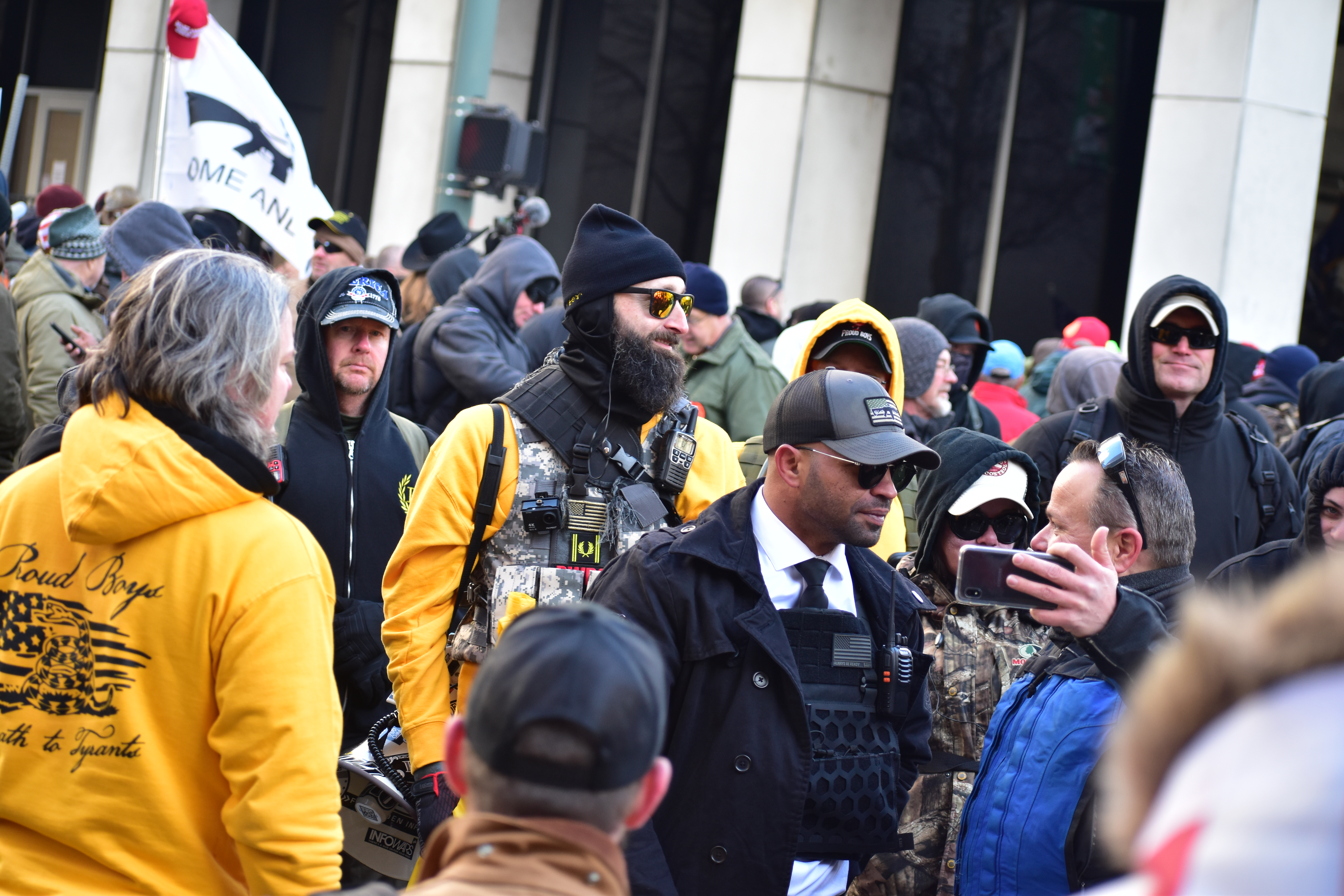
The Proud Boys at a Second Amendment rally in Richmond

In January 2020, the Proud Boys attended a large Second Amendment rally in Richmond, Virginia. They are opposed to Black Lives Matter protests and see attempts to remove statues of Confederate leaders and other historical figures as a "left-wing plot to destroy American history".

On May 10, 2020, a bulletin on COVID-19 protest disinformation campaigns by the Colorado Information Analysis Center (CIAC) described how "the Proud Boys, a far-right extremist group, has been active in spreading conspiracy theories regarding Covid-19 on Twitter, Facebook, and Telegram", suggesting that "a faction of elites are weaponizing the virus, and a vaccine would likely be a tool for population control and mind control". The CIAC bulletin also warned that "spread of disinformation has the potential to cause civil unrest and mass panic".

On May 30, 2020, Facebook officials reported that internal systems flagged activity from Proud Boys-related accounts encouraging "armed agitators" to attend protests following the murder of George Floyd.

The group remained active in the Pacific Northwest and had a dozen chapters in Idaho, Oregon and Washington by 2020. In June 2020, members of the Proud Boys rallied at the Capitol Hill Autonomous Zone in Seattle, Washington, in an effort to confront protesters.

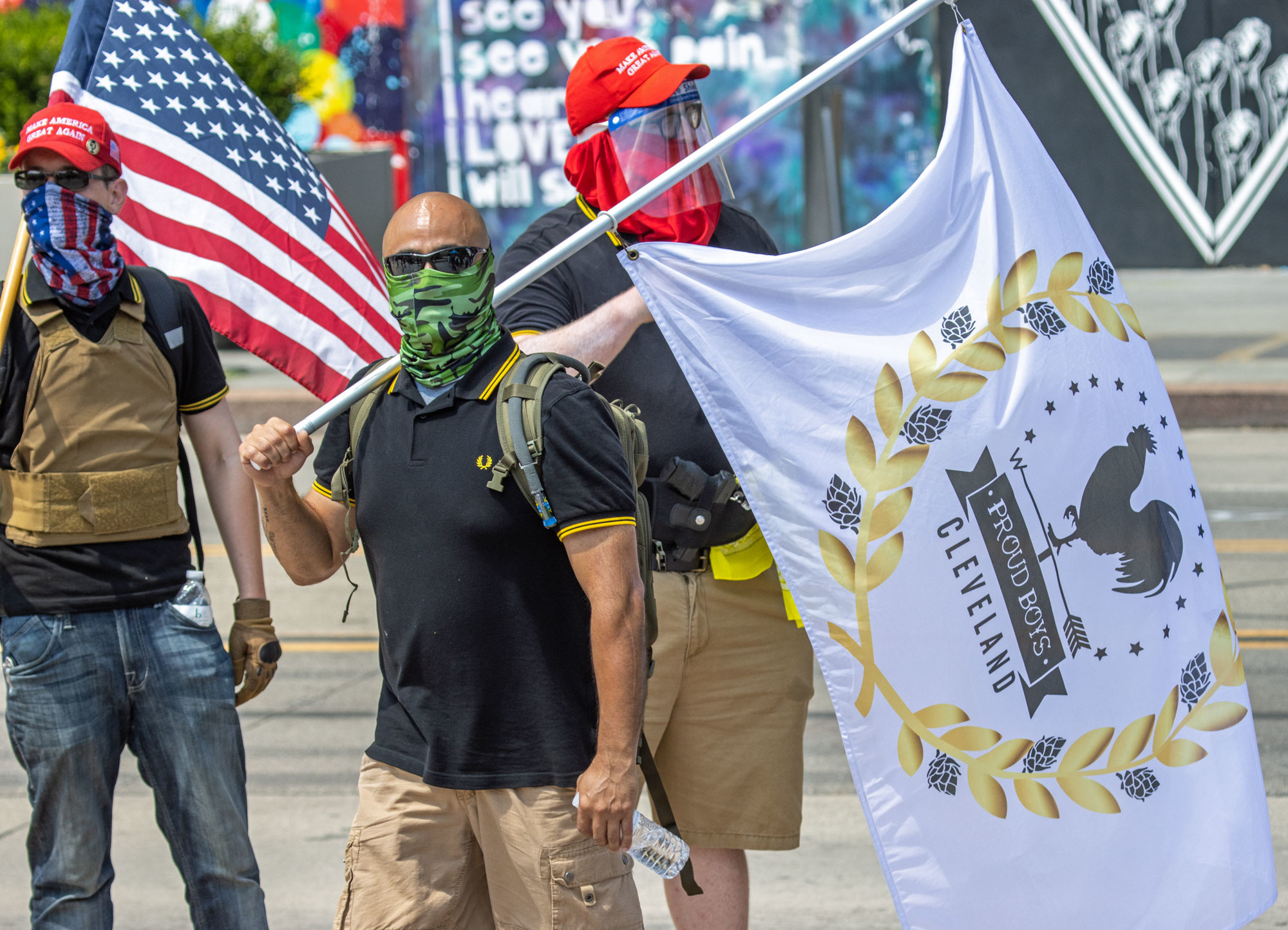
The Proud Boys at an Ohio event in 2020

Washington resident and Proud Boys member Tusitala "Tiny" Toese, known for brawling in the streets of Portland and Seattle during political protests, was arrested in Washington on August 28, 2020. He was wanted for multiple probation violations related to his 2018 misdemeanor assault conviction that left a protester with stitches and a concussion in June 2018. Toese, previously affiliated with Patriot Prayer, had been observed participating in other assaults with members of the Proud Boys, including an assault at a Clark County, Washington mall in May 2018 and an assault in Seattle in June 2020.

Texas-based Proud Boys member Alan Swinney was arrested on September 30, 2020, and held in Oregon on "multiple assault charges, pointing a firearm at another, unlawful use of a weapon and unlawful use of tear gas, stun gun or mace." Swinney had been recorded firing airsoft pellets at protesters and journalists, and at one point brandished a revolver at his opponents during a Portland, Oregon protest in August 2020. Swinney was later convicted of 11 offenses, including assault, and sentenced to 10 years in prison.

On October 1, 2020, The Guardian reported several United States agencies variously described the Proud Boys as "a dangerous 'white supremacist' group", "white supremacists", "extremists" and as "a gang", with law enforcement showing concern "about the group's menace to minority groups and police officers, and its conspiracy theories", including COVID-19 misinformation and conspiracy theories.

=== 2020 presidential debates ===
In the first 2020 presidential debate on September 29, 2020, President Donald Trump was asked by moderator Chris Wallace: "Are you willing, tonight, to condemn white supremacists and militia groups, and to say that they need to stand down and not add to the violence in a number of these cities as we saw in Kenosha, and as we have seen in Portland?" Trump replied: "Sure. Sure, I am willing to do that." He then asked for clarification, saying: "Who would you like me to condemn?" Wallace mentioned "white supremacists and right wing militia". During the exchange, Democratic presidential candidate Joe Biden replied "Proud Boys" and Trump replied: "Proud Boys, stand back and stand by, but I'll tell you what, I'll tell you what, somebody's got to do something about antifa and the left, because this is not a right-wing problem." Shortly after, Joe Biggs, one of the Proud Boys organizers, shared through his Parler social media account a logo with the president's words "Stand back" and "Stand by".

External videos
- The Proud Boys: How the right-wing extremist group gained prominence. The Washington Post, September 30, 2020.

One researcher said that Proud Boys memberships on Telegram channels grew nearly 10 percent after the debate. The Washington Post reported that Trump's comments were quickly "enshrined in memes, including one depicting Trump in one of the Proud Boys' signature polo shirts. Another meme showed Trump's quote alongside an image of bearded men carrying American flags and appearing to prepare for a fight."

On September 30, President Trump clarified his statement, stating that he "doesn't know what the Proud Boys are" and that "they should stand down. Let law enforcement do their work." On October 1, Trump said on Sean Hannity's show: "I've said it many times, and let me be clear again: I condemn the KKK. I condemn all white supremacists. I condemn the Proud Boys. I don't know much about the Proud Boys, almost nothing. But I condemn that."

During the second and final presidential debate on October 22, Democratic candidate Joe Biden mistakenly referred to the Proud Boys as "poor boys"—a slip that went viral on social media.

=== Reclamation of #ProudBoys on social media ===
In early October 2020, a campaign from the LGBT community on Twitter, seemingly started by actor George Takei, was launched to 'reclaim' the hashtag #proudboys. The hashtag was previously used by the group to identify bigoted content, but it began to be taken over by positive messages celebrating LGBT families and communities, with memes and photos of gay friends and families.

Reception to the reclamation has largely been positive, with the hashtag trending on October 4. Tweets from prominent figures such as journalist Jane Lytvynenko and Florida Representative Carlos Guillermo Smith have acknowledged the campaign, with Takei tweeting that "our community and allies answered hate with love." The Canadian Armed Forces in the United States also tweeted out support, with a picture of Corporal Brent Kenny kissing another man, with the Royal Canadian Navy and the account for HMCS Winnipeg (that Kenny sailed on) retweeting. In a later tweet, the Canadian Armed Forces in the United States posted: "If you wear our uniform, know what it means. If you're thinking about wearing our uniform, know what it means. Love is love."

In response to the tweets, Proud Boys leader Tarrio officially commented that it was hysterical and that "this isn't something that's offensive to us. It's not an insult. We aren't homophobic. We don't care who people sleep with. People think it's going to bother us. It doesn't." On largely-conservative social media app Parler, messages posted by members contained chiefly hateful comments such as "fags, can't stand gay people...should be illegal." Forbes has also reported Tarrio had posted opposing comments on Parler, describing how he believes "the left was attempting to turn the group's name into 'a slur' and that the gay pride campaign with #proudboys was an attempt 'to drown out the voices of our supporters.'"

=== Foreign disinformation during the 2020 presidential campaign ===
During the 2020 presidential campaign in October, threatening emails claiming to be from the Proud Boys were sent to Democratic voters in Alaska, Arizona, Florida and Pennsylvania, the last three of which were swing states in the upcoming election. The emails warned: "You will vote for Trump on Election Day or we will come after you." Proud Boys chairman Enrique Tarrio denied the group's involvement and said he had spoken to the FBI about it. Tarrio told The Washington Post that "[t]wo weeks ago I believe we had Google Cloud services drop us from their platform, so then we initiated a url transfer, which is still in process. We kind of just never used it." Miami New Times reported that the emails came from info@proudboysofficial.com, one of two websites belonging to the Proud Boys, and which Tarrio said had not been updated in a year and a half. Tarrio added that an authentic email from the Proud Boys would come from proudboysusa.com. The FBI announced that Iranian intelligence was responsible for the spoofed emails sent to intimidate Florida voters, and added that Russia was also working to influence the election. Officials from each country denied the accusations.

=== Gang assault ===
In 2019, two Proud Boys were sentenced to four years in prison for attempted gang assault, attempted assault and other charges for a 2018 New York incident where they attacked individuals who prosecutors said were members of antifa.

== 2020–2023 ==
=== D.C. Asbury United Methodist Church incident and criminal charges against Tarrio ===
On December 12, 2020, members of the Proud Boys targeted Ashbury United Methodist Church, the oldest historically black church in Washington, D.C., after pro-Trump protests earlier that day. They flashed white supremacist hand signs and tore down and burned a Black Lives Matter sign that had been raised by the church. Reverend Ianther M. Mills, the church's pastor, described the acts as "reminiscent of cross burnings" and expressed sadness that local police had failed to intervene. Proud Boys leader Enrique Tarrio attempted to claim responsibility for the incident, which police have designated a hate crime. He was arrested on January 4, 2021, and charged with one count of destruction of property (a misdemeanor) and two counts of possession of high-capacity ammunition feeding devices (a felony); local authorities indicated the U.S. Attorney's Office would be the authority to decide whether or not to file hate-crime charges. The Metropolitan African Methodist Episcopal Church, which also targeted by vandalism during the December 12, 2020 protest, sued the Proud Boys and Tarrio. The judge in the case also issued an injunction banning Tarrio from entering the District of Columbia, save for limited exceptions related to court matters.

=== U.S. Capitol attack ===
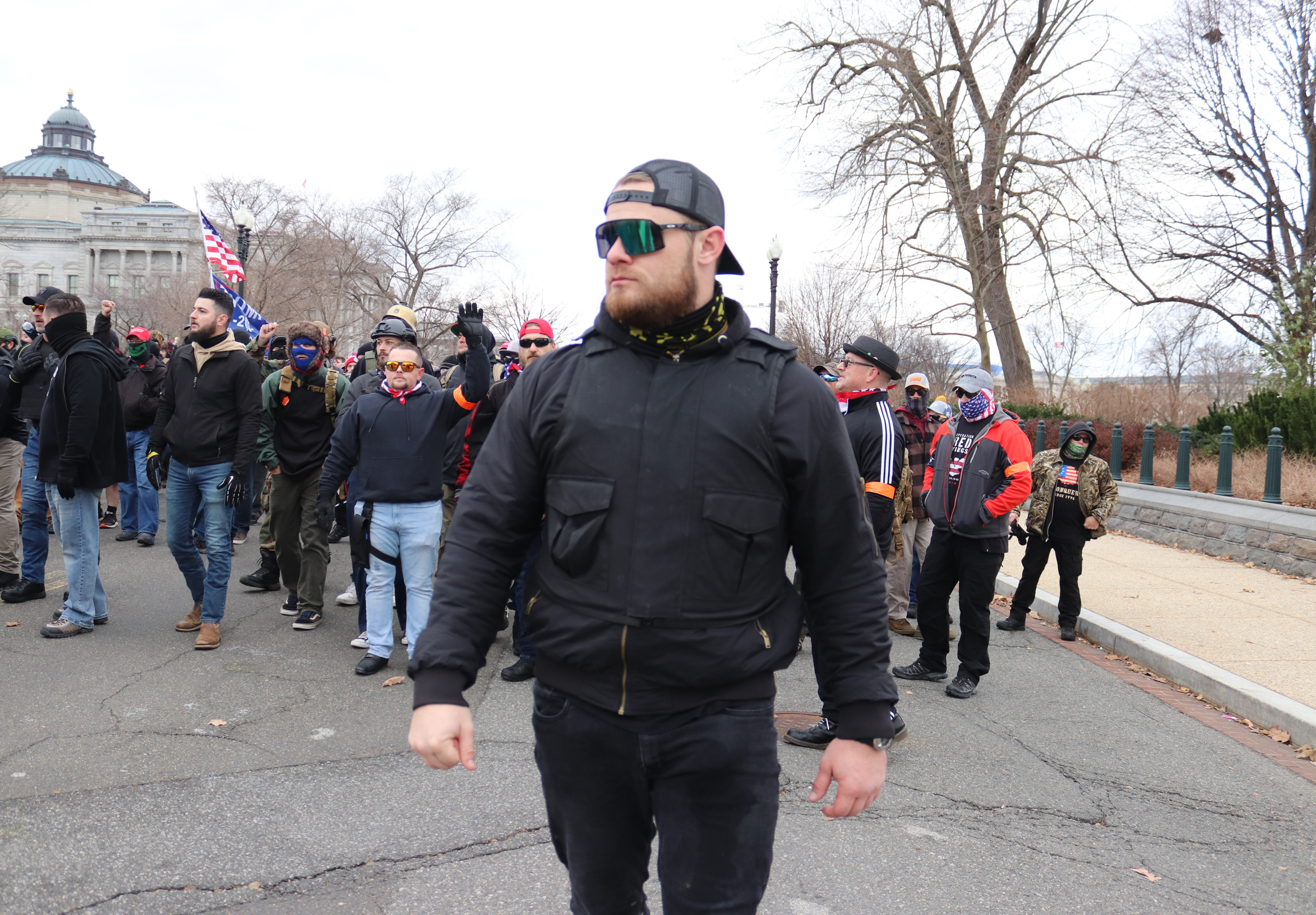
Ethan Nordean leads a Proud Boys contingent as they march toward the Capitol Building on January 6.

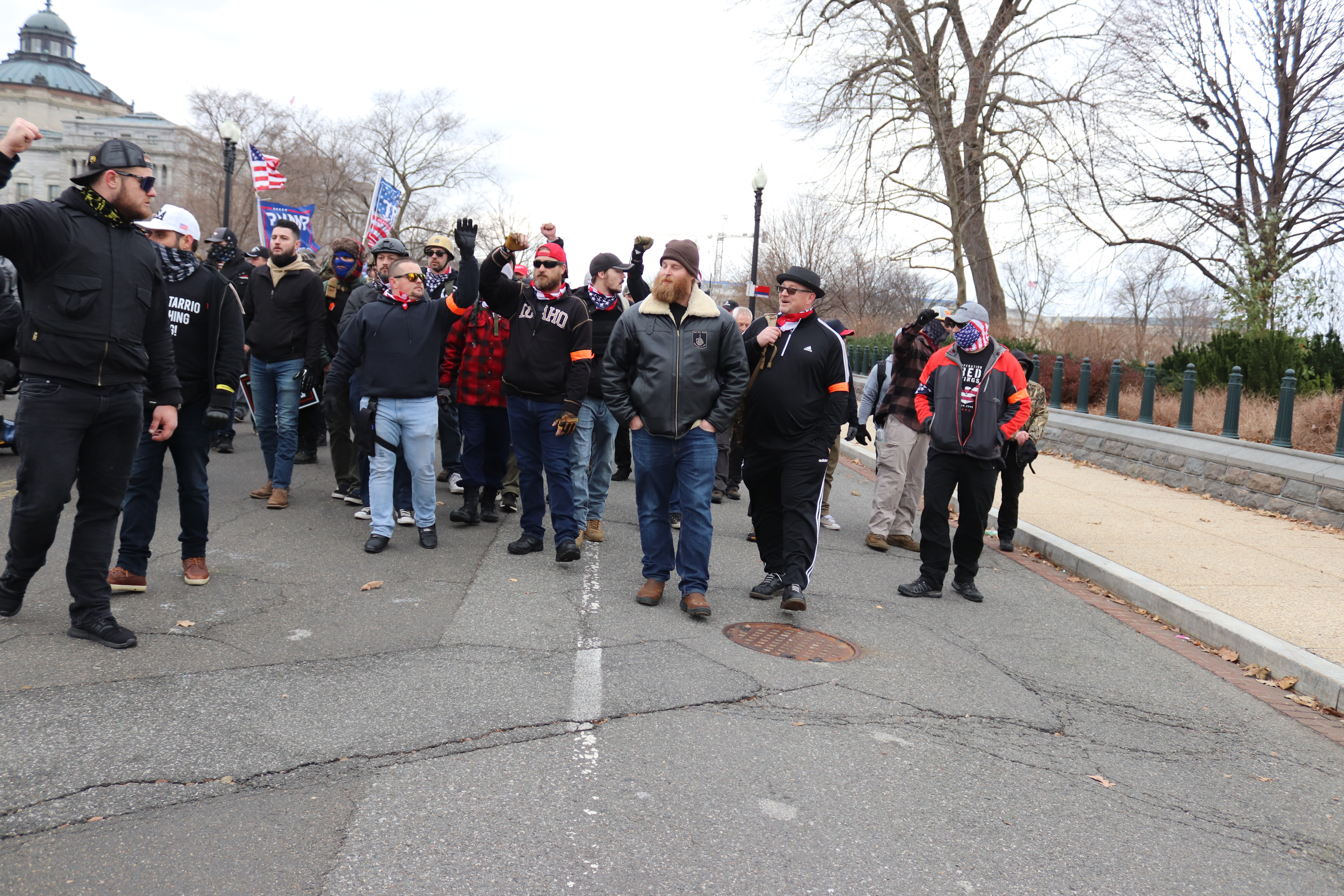
Members of the Proud Boys passing the U.S. Supreme Court on their way to the Capitol building on January 6, 2021

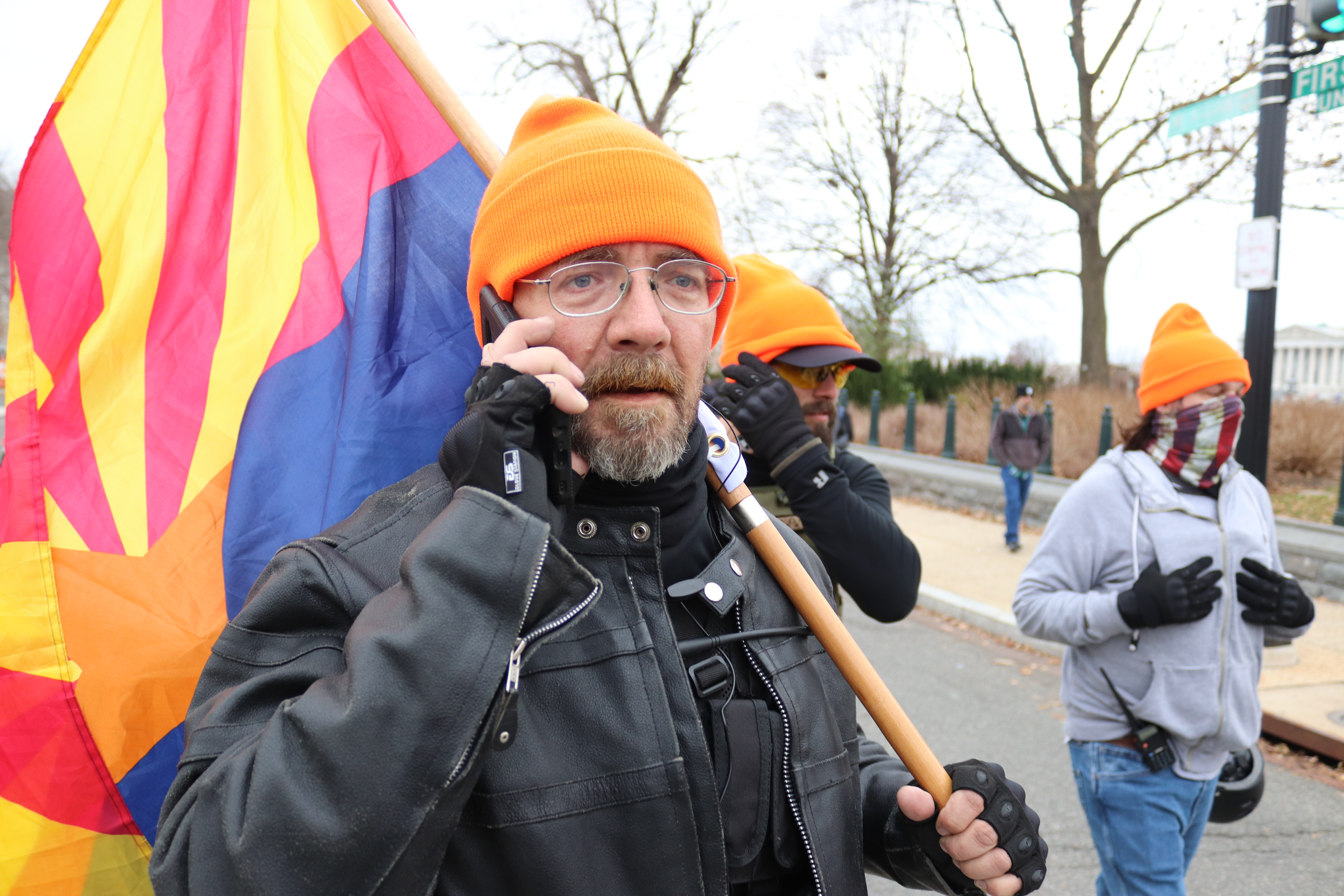
Proud Boys from Arizona marching to the Capitol building wearing orange hats

On January 6, 2021, many members of the Proud Boys participated in an attack on the United States Capitol, where some members of the group appeared wearing orange hats. Some members wore all black clothing, rather than their usual black and yellow attire, as Tarrio had suggested in a Parler post days earlier, which prosecutors said was an apparent reference to mimicking the appearance of antifa members. Analysis by CNN found at least eleven individuals with ties to Proud Boys had been charged by February 3. The Justice Department announced on February 3, 2021, that two members had been indicted for conspiracy. Five individuals affiliated with Proud Boys were charged with conspiracy on February 11, followed by six more on February 26. Federal grand jury conspiracy indictments of others followed. Federal prosecutors were considering whether to pursue charges under the Racketeer Influenced and Corrupt Organizations Act, which is typically used to prosecute organized crime syndicates.

A review by the Wall Street Journal of social media posts from Proud Boys members showed that the group repeatedly invoked Trump's messages as a call to action, and were disheartened by the arrests and what they perceived to be Trump's lack of action in the days leading up to Joe Biden's inauguration.

On February 16, 2021, Representative Bennie G. Thompson (D-Miss.), the chairman of the United States House Homeland Security Committee, filed a federal lawsuit against Donald Trump, Rudy Giuliani, Oath Keepers founder Stewart Rhodes, and Proud Boys International LLC. The lawsuit alleges that the events at the Capitol on January 6 violated the Third Enforcement Act of 1871. The chairman of the Proud Boys, Enrique Tarrio, called the lawsuit "frivolous".

The New York Times reported in March 2021 that the incident had caused Proud Boys and other far-right groups to splinter amid disagreements on whether the storming had gone too far or was a success, and doubts about the leadership of their organizations, raising concerns of increasing numbers of lone wolf actors who would be more difficult to monitor and might pursue more extreme actions.

The New York Times reported in March 2021 that the FBI was investigating communications between an unnamed associate of the White House and an unnamed member of Proud Boys during the days prior to the incursion. The communications had been detected by examining cellphone metadata and were separate from previously known contacts between Roger Stone and Proud Boys.

=== Portland, Oregon march ===
On August 23, 2021, the Proud Boys held a rally in Portland, Oregon, where they clashed with antifa counter-demonstrators. Alan Swinney, a Proud Boy from Texas, attended the George Floyd march in Portland, Oregon where he “calmly and dispassionately used or threatened force” by spraying marchers with mace, shooting random people with a paint ball gun, (causing one marcher to lose an eye) and threatening others with a loaded gun. He was found guilty of attempted assault, second-degree unlawful use of mace, and pointing a firearm and was sentenced to 10 years in prison.

=== San Lorenzo Library storming ===
On June 12, 2022, a group identified as Proud Boys by the Alameda County Sheriff's Office stormed a children's Drag Queen Story Time event at the San Lorenzo Library. Members of the Drag Queen Story Hour described the group as reportedly "extremely aggressive" who "totally freaked out the kids," by shouting homophobic and transphobic slurs during the event. Sheriff's office is investigating the attack as a possible hate crime.

=== Split with neo-Nazis ===
In June 2023, the Global Project Against Hate and Extremism reported that 10 Proud Boy chapters, mainly sympathetic to neo-Nazi ideas, split with the national organization after a fight broke out on June 25th between a dozen members of the Proud Boys and the neo-Nazi Rose City Nationalists.
