= Trump Free Speech Rally =

2017 protest in Portland, Oregon, U.S.

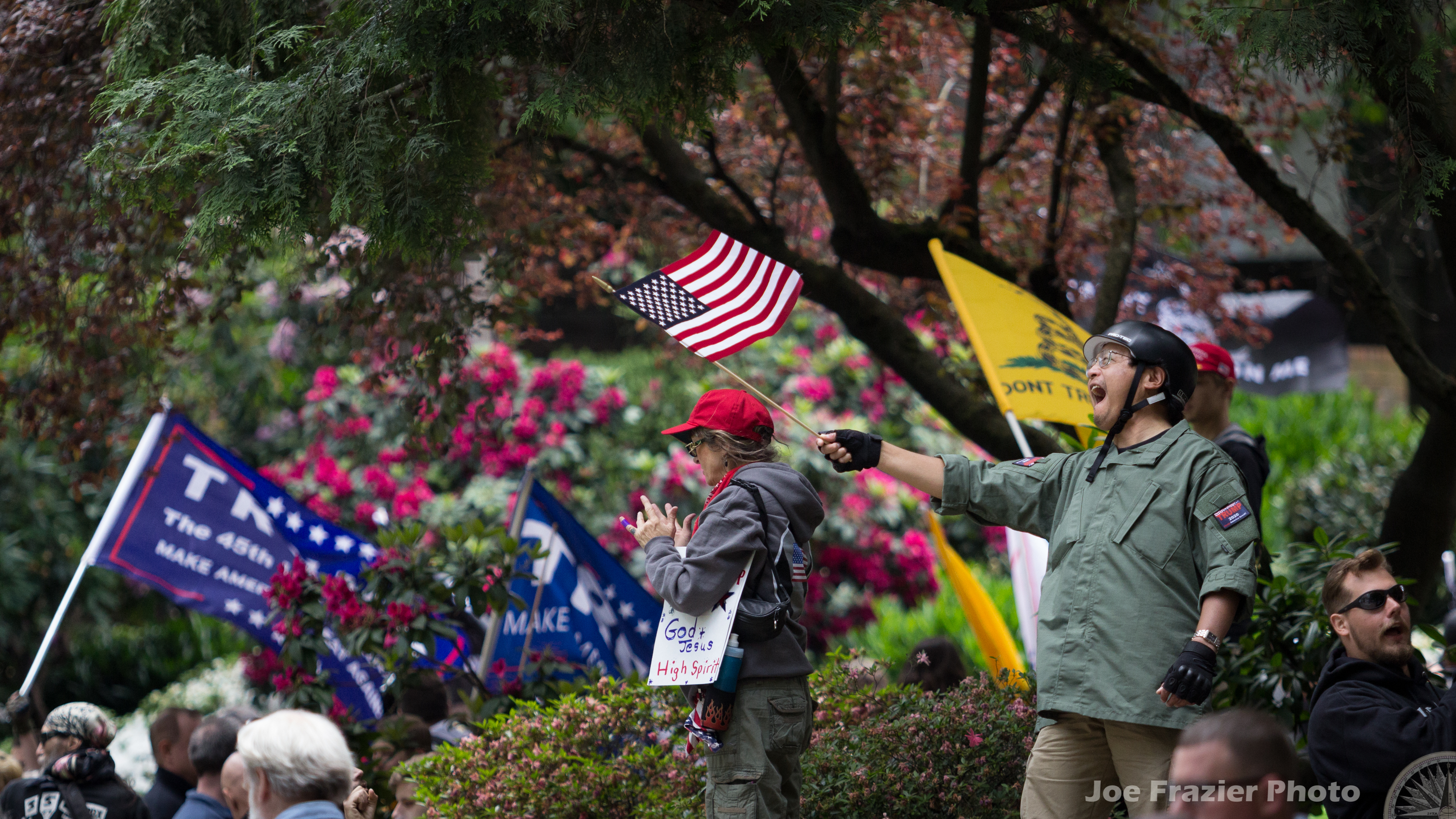
- Rally participants
- Date: June 4, 2017
- Venue: Terry Schrunk Plaza
- Location: Portland, Oregon, United States; 45.5146°N 122.678°W
- Organized by: Patriot Prayer
- Participants: Thousands, including several hundred Trump supporters and a larger group of counter-protesters
- Arrests: 14

The Trump Free Speech Rally was a demonstration organized by Patriot Prayer on June 4, 2017, in Portland, Oregon, in support of President Donald Trump. Several hundred participants gathered, along with a larger group of counter-protesters who organized the Portland Stands United Against Hate Rally outside City Hall. Police worked to keep the groups separate and closed neighboring Chapman Square where anti-fascist demonstrators had gathered. Officers clashed with this particular group of demonstrators, and fourteen people were arrested. Many weapons were confiscated, but there were no reported injuries.

== Background ==
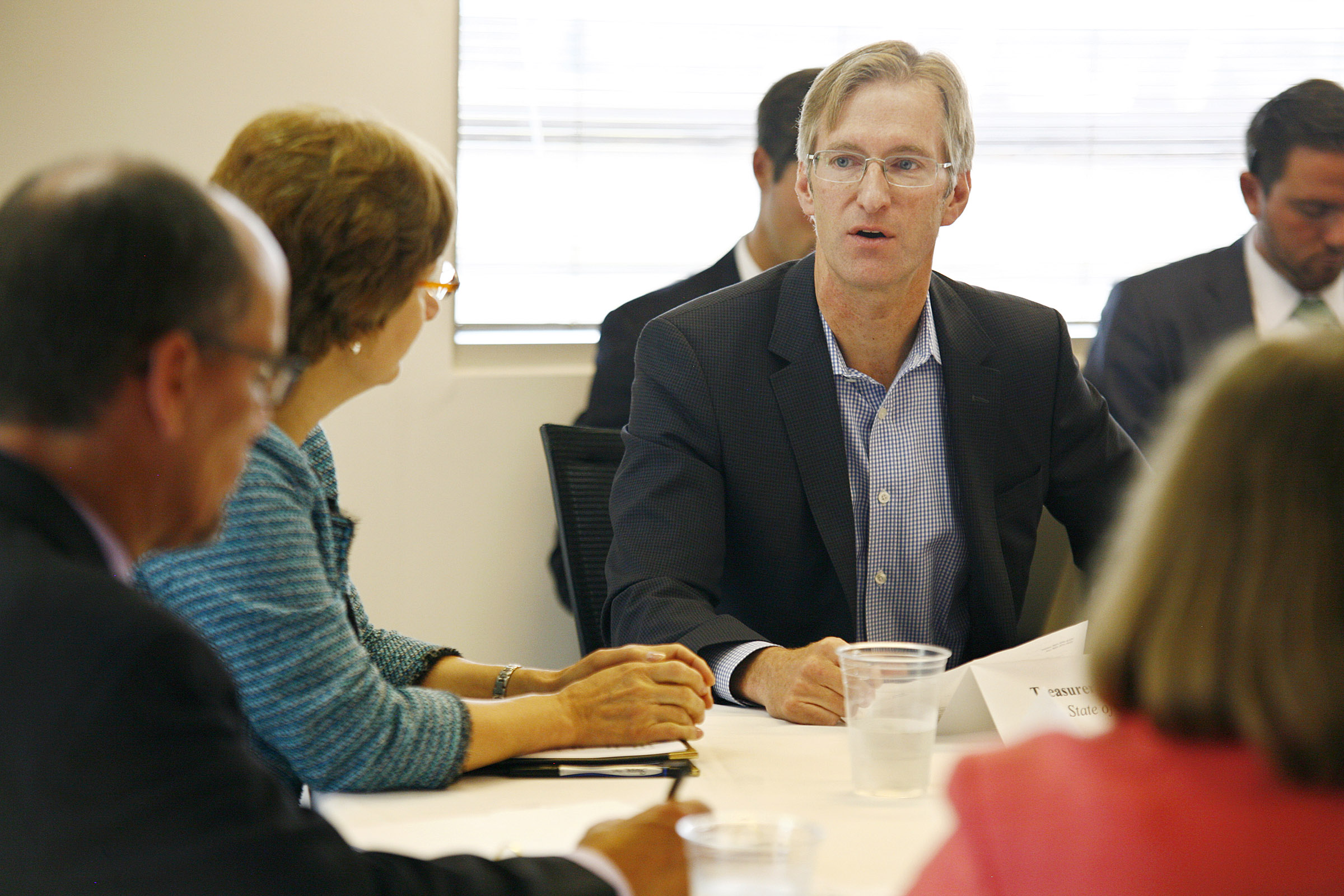
Mayor Ted Wheeler asked organizers to cancel the rally, and his attempt to revoke the permit was unsuccessful.

The Trump Free Speech Rally was held one week after the May 26 train attack, when a man fatally stabbed two people and injured a third after he was confronted for shouting what were described as racist and anti-Muslim slurs at two teenage girls on a MAX Light Rail. According to KGW, the suspect in the stabbings was at a demonstration similar to the Trump Free Speech Rally in April, when his bat was confiscated and he fought with counter-protesters.

Mayor Ted Wheeler and families of the victims asked organizers to cancel the Trump Free Speech Rally, which was scheduled prior to the attack and they said might have potential to "exacerbate an already difficult situation". Organizer Joey Gibson of the conservative group Patriot Prayer sympathized and said he hoped the event would be "a positive experience". The American Civil Liberties Union of Oregon's legal director said not allowing the rally to continue would have been unconstitutional. Wheeler's attempt to revoke the permit was unsuccessful.

Banners with "ominous messages regarding the rally" were displayed across Interstate 5 overpasses during the night before the scheduled event. The Portland Police Bureau, Federal Bureau of Investigation, and U.S. Department of Homeland Security all planned to have officers patrolling in Portland, and TriMet warned about possible disturbances to public transport. The reverend of Portland's United Church of Christ released a statement before the rally, in which she said, "We build our hope and our stamina for justice by showing up."

== Description ==
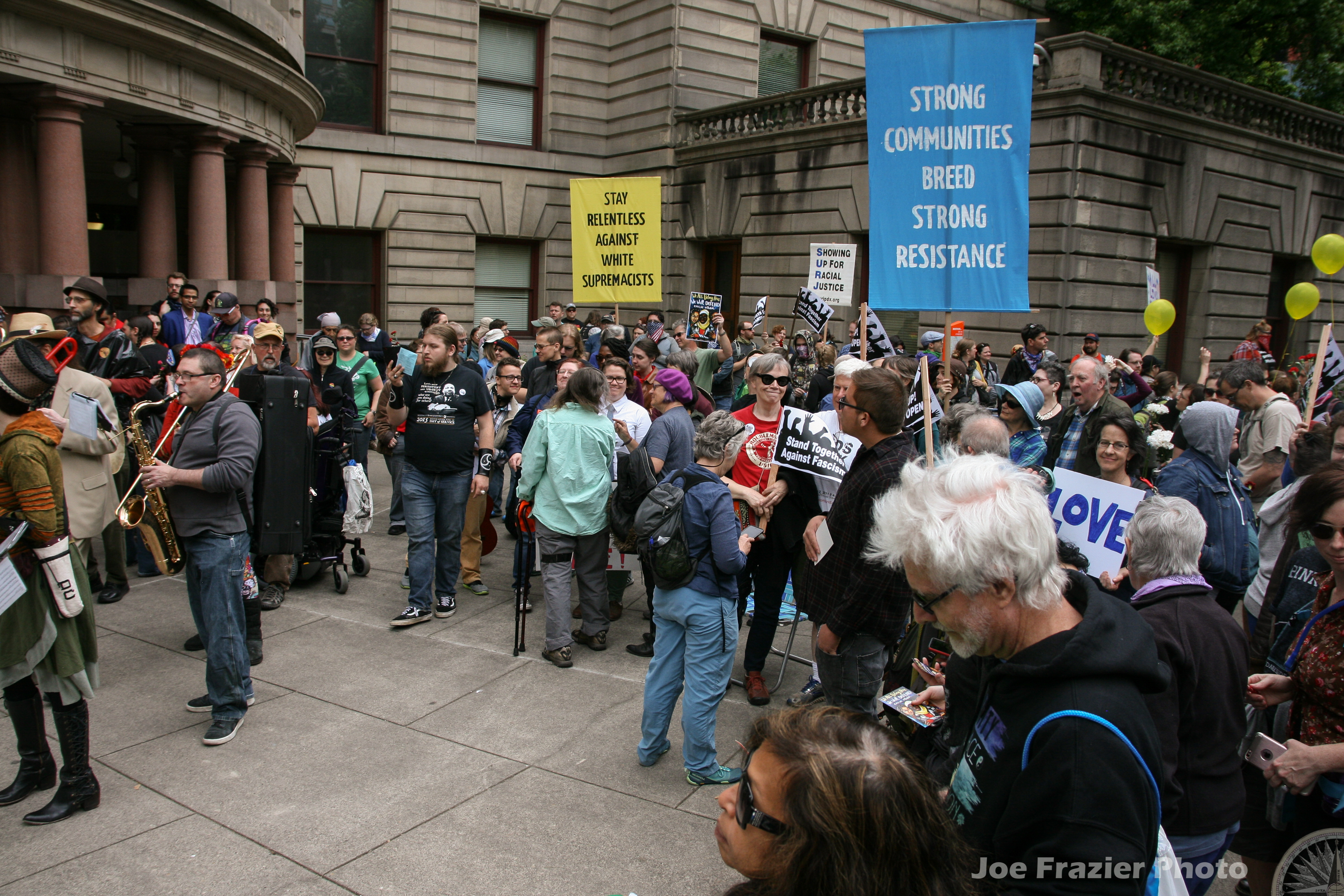
Counter-protesters at the Portland Stands United Against Hate Rally outside Portland City Hall

The Trump Free Speech Rally was organized by Patriot Prayer and held on June 4 in downtown Portland's Terry Schrunk Plaza, a federally-controlled property across from Portland City Hall. The event was scheduled to begin at 2pm, and counter-protesters were expected to start arriving a couple hours earlier. Several hundred Trump supporters gathered, as did a larger group of counter-protesters organized by immigrant, labor rights, and religious groups, and other local activists, who convened at the Portland Stands United Against Hate Rally (PSUAHR) outside City Hall.

Gibson held a moment of silence to commemorate the two men who died from the train attack and asked attendees to avoid violence. He also said the rally's purpose was to "wake up the liberty movement", and assured attendees they could be conservative in Portland. Participants displayed banners supporting Trump and chanted "U.S.A." The Trump Free Speech Rally reportedly "grew tense at times but remained mostly peaceful". Police officers, some outfitted for riot control, worked to keep the opposing groups separated. PSUAHR participants reportedly held signs that read "Black Lives Matter" and "our city is greater than hate", and chanted "go home, fascists" and "love, not hate".

By late afternoon, police closed neighboring Chapman Square, in the Plaza Blocks, where a separate group of anti-fascist protesters had gathered. These demonstrators reportedly threw balloons filled with an "unknown, foul-smelling liquid", bricks, and rocks at officers, who responded by firing "impact weapons and chemical munitions" (pepper-spray projectiles and stun grenades) to disperse the crowd. Police also moved agitators through a checkpoint to be identified and photographed before being released. Several people, including journalists, were detained. Fourteen of the activists at Chapman Square were arrested, and officers confiscated a variety of weapons, including brass knuckles, bricks, clubs, a hunting knife, homemade shields, a slingshot, sticks, and roadside flares. Police confirmed no crimes were committed by Trump Free Speech and Portland Stands United Against Hate rallies.

There were no reported injuries.

== Reactions ==
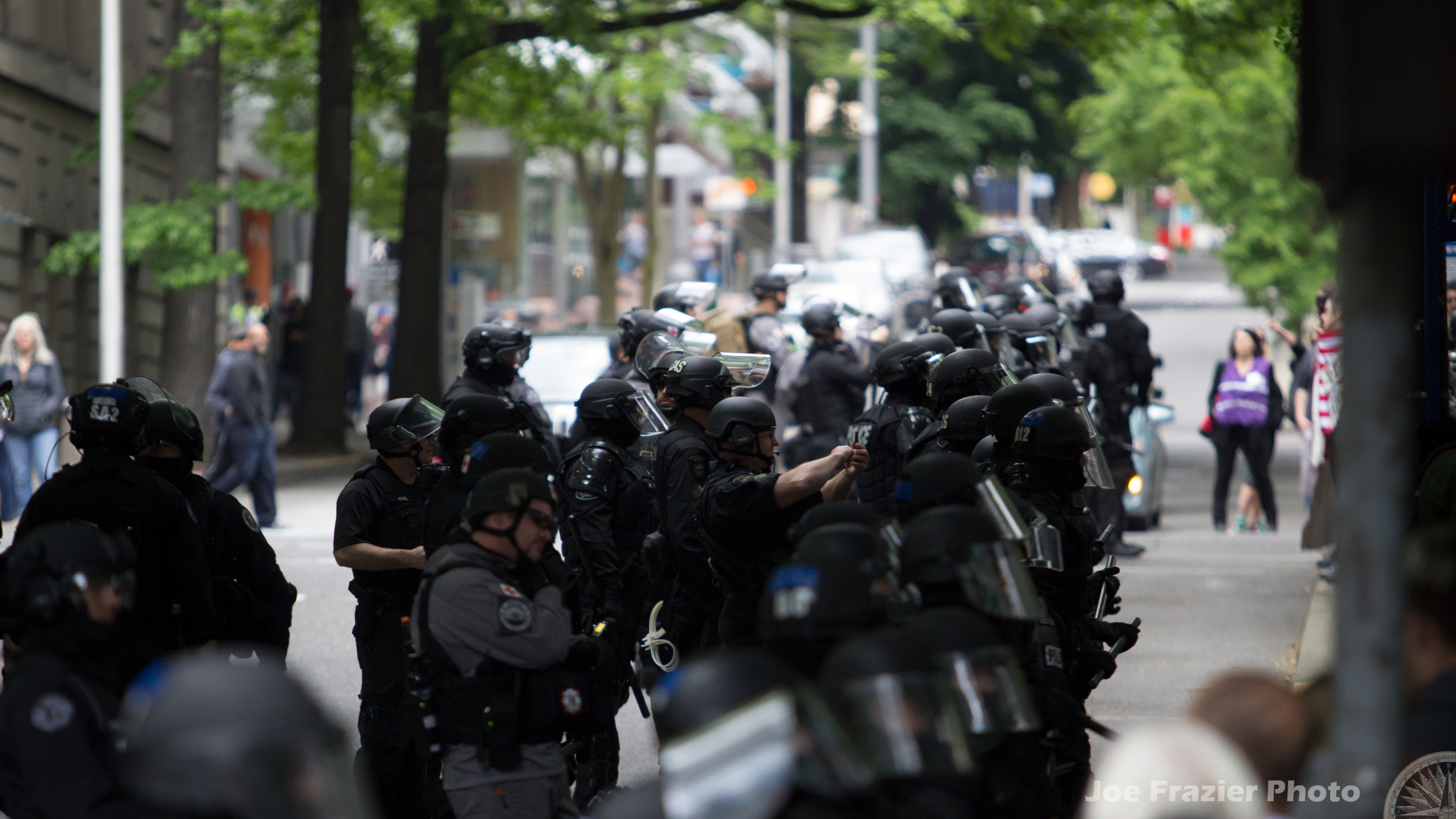
Riot police keeping opposing groups separated

The mayor's official request for the federal government to revoke the permit, and a statement from his official Twitter account that hate speech was not protected by the First Amendment, came under fire from many directions in the Portland area and beyond. The ACLU immediately tweeted back that "The government cannot revoke or deny a permit based on the viewpoint of the demonstrators. Period.", and said on the Oregon chapter's website that the government may not "pick and choose how to apply constitutional rights" and had engaged in "viewpoint discrimination". Conservative commentators and bloggers lambasted the mayor with words like "blatant hypocrisy", "obviously pretextual", "[Portland's] reputation as one of America's most enlightened cities is undeserved", and "because...Trump". The International Socialist Organization wrote that "Calls from politicians to put limitations on speech, like the attempt made by Portland mayor Ted Wheeler to get the federal government to revoke the alt-right's permit for the June 4 rally, only serve to further embolden the right and plant the seeds for future crackdowns on the left". A Daily Emerald commentator wrote "Mayor Wheeler doesn't seem to understand the First Amendment very well".
