= Cider Riot =

Defunct cidery in Portland, Oregon, U.S.

Cider Riot!

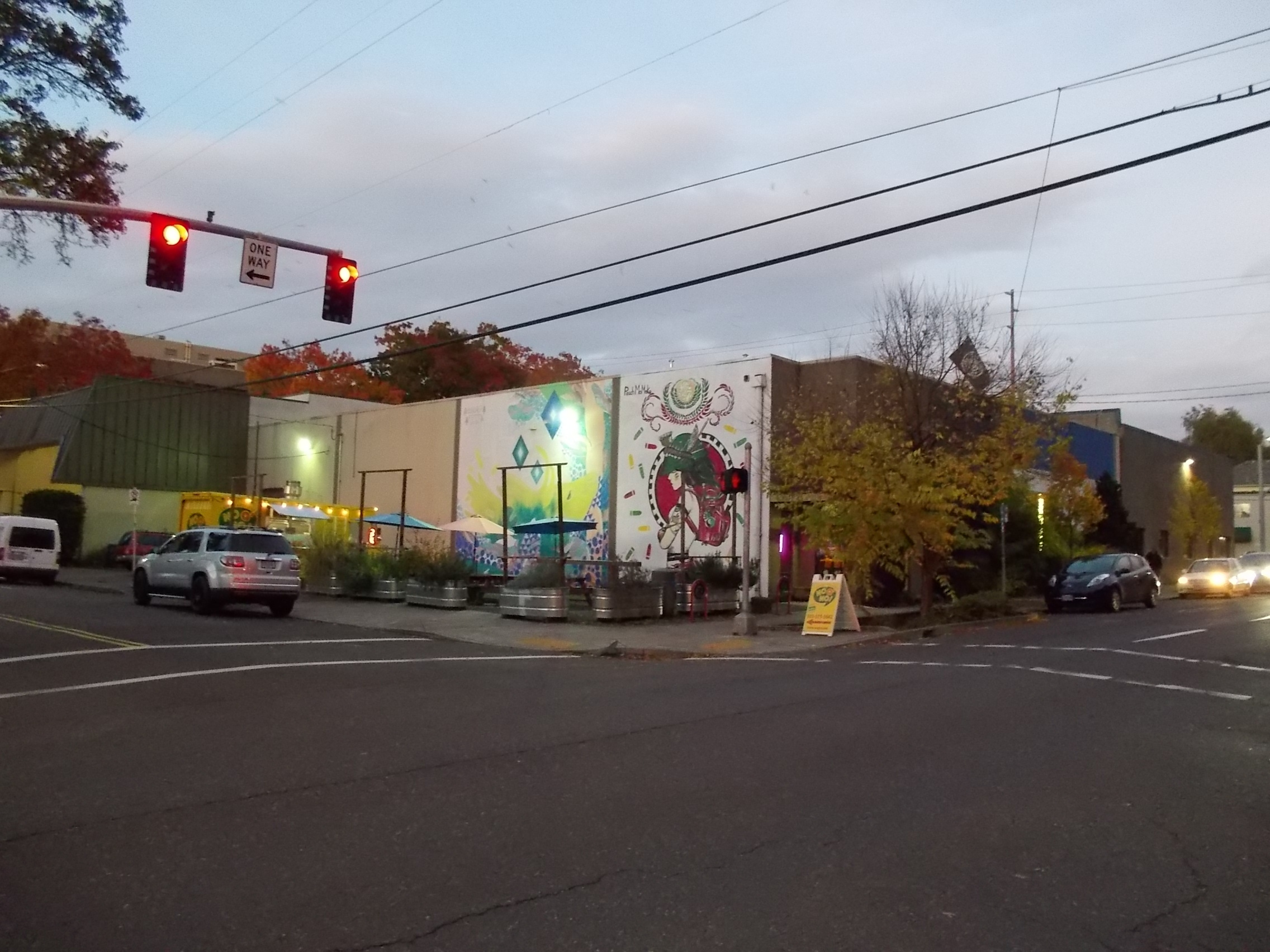
- The cider house's exterior in 2019
- Interactive map of Cider Riot!

Restaurant information
- Established: August 2016 (taproom)
- Closed: November 10, 2019
- Food type: Hard apple cider
- Location: 807 NE Couch Street, Portland, Multnomah, Oregon, 97232, United States
- Coordinates: 45°31′25.7″N 122°39′26.4″W

Cider Riot (stylized as Cider Riot!) was an American cider producer with a cider house in the Kerns neighborhood in Northeast Portland, Oregon, from 2016 until November 2019.

Production of cider began in 2013 and grew to a peak of one thousand barrels annually. Cider Riot earned four International Cider Championship medals from the Royal Bath and West Show between 2017 and 2019. The cider house, described as a "gathering place for antifascists, anarchists and other leftists", was the site of a brawl between members of the far-right group Patriot Prayer and the bar's patrons on May Day in 2019.

== History ==
The company was founded by Abram Goldman-Armstrong, who started the business from his North Tabor home in 2013. Goldman-Armstrong began experimentally fermenting cider as a college student. After setting up his cider business in Portland in 2013, he expanded distribution the following year, delivering cider around town to various pubs. Cider Riot continued to grow production and opened a taproom in August 2016.

Goldman-Armstrong expressed that Cider Riot set out to be "a welcoming place for everybody in our community" for "people of all races, genders, and identities." When the taproom launched in 2016, the cidery's policy was that children were welcome until seven, followed by time for adults until the pub closed at nine in the evening. In 2016 the company's cider was awarded "best cider in Oregon" at the Portland International Cider Cup.

Goldman-Armstrong stated that right-wing groups such as Patriot Prayer began to regularly harass the business in the summer of 2017. The business owner specified that he did not set out to form a dedicated anti-fascist bar, rather his vision for the cidery was to create a sense of old Portland and an English pub. By 2019, he became known as a vocal anti-fascist business owner.

The pub carried a line of experimental ciders known as their Black Bloc series. Following a May 2019 decision by Major League Soccer (MLS) to prohibit the display of the Iron Front symbol during soccer games, Goldman-Armstrong, a long-time supporter of the Timbers Army soccer group, produced a limited-edition cider variety for the pub named Tres Flechas (Three Arrows) in reference to an anti-fascist symbol. The cider house owner was among those issued a three-game ban for displaying flags with the symbol at soccer games in September 2019. On September 24, MLS revoked their ban on the public display of the antifascist symbol and agreed to form a working group made up from staff, supporters, and diversity and inclusion experts to update the Fan Code of Conduct for 2020.

Cider Riot earned two bronze medals at Bath and West International Cider Championships in 2017, and two additional awards in 2019. Plaid Pantry convenience stores carried Cider Riot's product in a six pack, but after sales trends shifted away from the cider market, moving towards hard seltzer by early 2020, their stores stopped carrying it. Once the cidery was fully established, the company produced one thousand barrels of cider annually.

=== May Day brawl ===
On May Day 2019, a brawl between far-right protesters Patriot Prayer and anti-fascist cider house patrons took place outside Cider Riot in the early evening. The Oregonian reported that the situation erupted after some 20 right-wing protesters arrived at Cider Riot and confronted antifa members sitting on the patio. A police detective described video of the group's leader, Joey Gibson, "taunting" and threatening members of antifa and later “physically pushing” a woman before she was hit with a baton and knocked unconscious by someone else.

The company filed a US$1 million lawsuit against Patriot Prayer and Gibson. Six participants of the brawl were accused of inciting a riot and were indicted by the Multnomah County District Attorney on charges of felony riot in August 2019. Five of the men were connected to Patriot Prayer, including Gibson. Two of the men, both of whom were members of Patriot Prayer, pleaded guilty in January 2020. A third man with ties to Patriot Prayer pleaded guilty in May 2021 to one count each of riot, second-degree assault, and unlawful use of a weapon. Gibson was acquitted of felony riot charges in July 2022, and the judge rebuked the district attorney's office for pursuing a trial on the evidence presented.

In response to a lawsuit-related interview question by New School Beer (a beer and cider news source), Goldman-Armstrong said that if Cider Riot was awarded the asking damages, they planned to use the money to "stay open, invest in a bigger glycol chiller, more sales and marketing folks, etc."

A 2019 investigation by Oregon regulators alleged that Goldman-Armstrong was aware patrons were using illegal weapons against right-wing agitators and that he refused to remove problem customers from his property. Goldman-Armstrong and a licensed security guard working the day of the brawl were "accused of providing misleading statements to state authorities during the investigation". The allegations are in a report made by a safety inspector for the Oregon Liquor Control Commission (OLCC). The OLCC report recommended charging Cider Riot's owner and staff with three state alcohol license violations: providing false statements, failure to evict, and permitting unlawful and disorderly activity. OLCC investigators reported that the complaints were not from cider house patrons but were instead from “concerned citizens throughout the state" who viewed video of the brawl on the news and YouTube." Lawyers for Goldman-Armstrong relayed that Gibson and Patriot Prayer had used social media to encourage supporters to report Cider Riot to state regulators.

=== Auto collision fatality ===
In October 2019, the driver of an SUV struck and killed an anti-fascist activist near Cider Riot, shortly after the man left the cider house. The owner of Cider Riot told KPTV that the deceased, Sean Kealiher, an outspoken activist involved in Portland protests, had been at the cidery on the night of the incident. The SUV involved, which had been shot at by Hyatt Eshelman, a friend of the deceased, was found abandoned with bullet holes at the Democratic Party of Oregon two blocks away from Cider Riot. According to police, Kealiher’s death was under investigation as a homicide, and by late October 2019, neither a motive nor a suspect had been identified. In December 2019, The Oregonian's Andrew Theen commented that the incident was "perhaps the city’s most prominent traffic-related death". A suspect, Christopher Knipe, was arrested and charged with second-degree murder on August 4, 2022. In September 2023, he agreed to plead guilty to manslaughter as part of a plea deal which includes a 17-year prison sentence.

=== Sale ===
Cider Riot was put up for sale for $875,000 in September 2019. Goldman-Armstrong said he hoped the buyer would "share [his] view on human rights". In an interview with The Oregonian in September 2019, Goldman-Armstrong said his decision to sell the business was not related to the "clash outside Cider Riot, and the months of headlines it's generated". Cider Riot closed on November 10, 2019. After closing, the Cider Riot taproom was recognized as a runner-up in the "Best Cider House" category in the Willamette Week's "Best of Portland Readers' Poll 2020".
