= Tusitala Toese =

American convicted felon (born 1996)

Tusitala John Toese
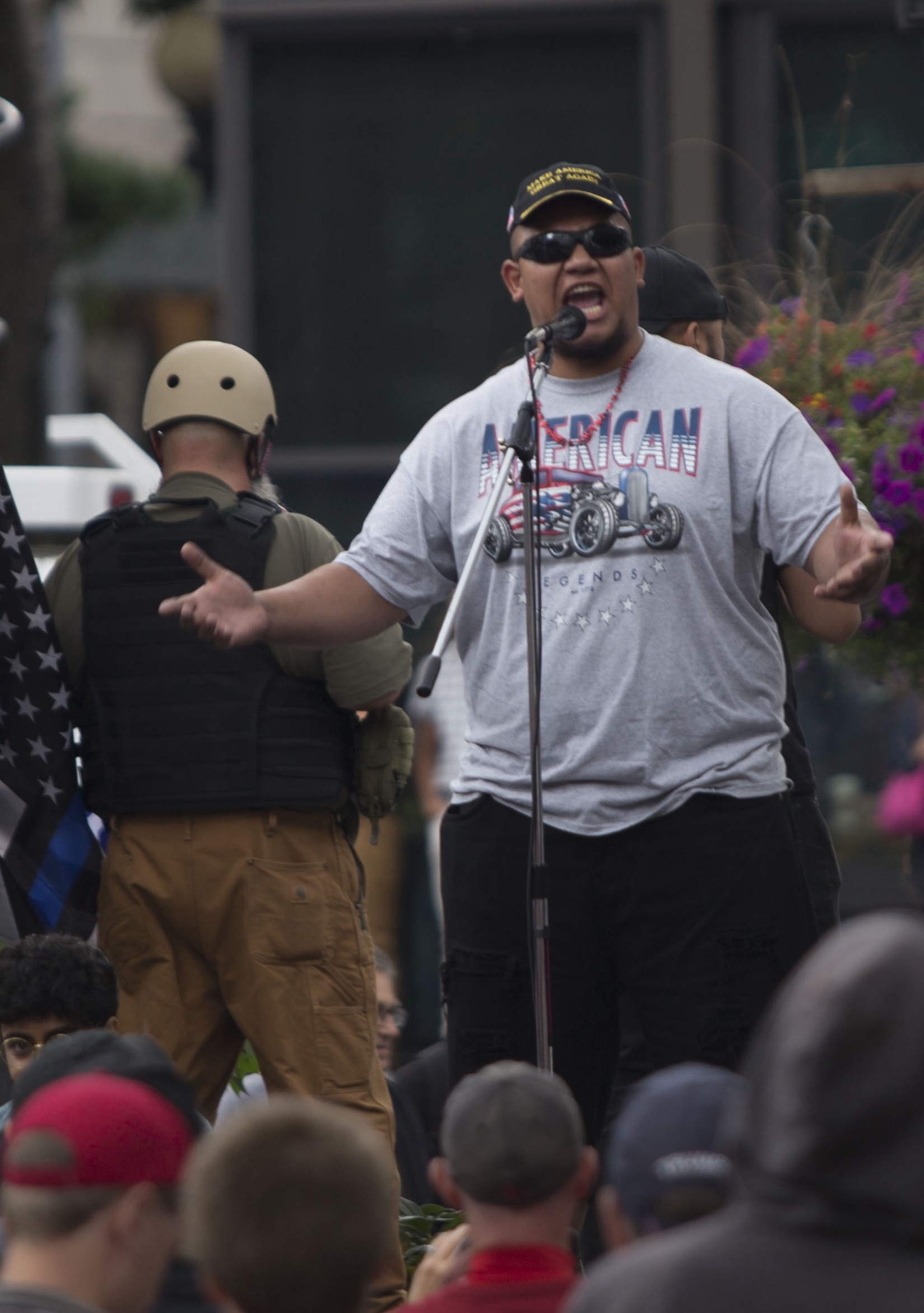
- Toese in 2017
- Born: June 4, 1996 (age 29)
- Other names: Tiny
- Known for: member of Proud Boys and Patriot Prayer
- Criminal charges: Second-degree assault with a weapon (x2); Third degree assault (x2); Unlawful use of a weapon (x2); Riot (x2); First-degree criminal mischief (x2)
- Criminal penalty: 95 months in prison
- Criminal status: Incarcerated at Snake River Correctional Institution

Tusitala John Toese (born June 4, 1996), also known as Tiny, is an American member of the Proud Boys, a far-right group that engages in political violence in the United States. He is also a member of the Portland area far-right group Patriot Prayer, prior to joining the Proud Boys, and has been convicted of multiple criminal charges for violence at rallies. On July 21, 2023, he was sentenced to 95 months in prison after being convicted of several assault charges.

== Activities ==
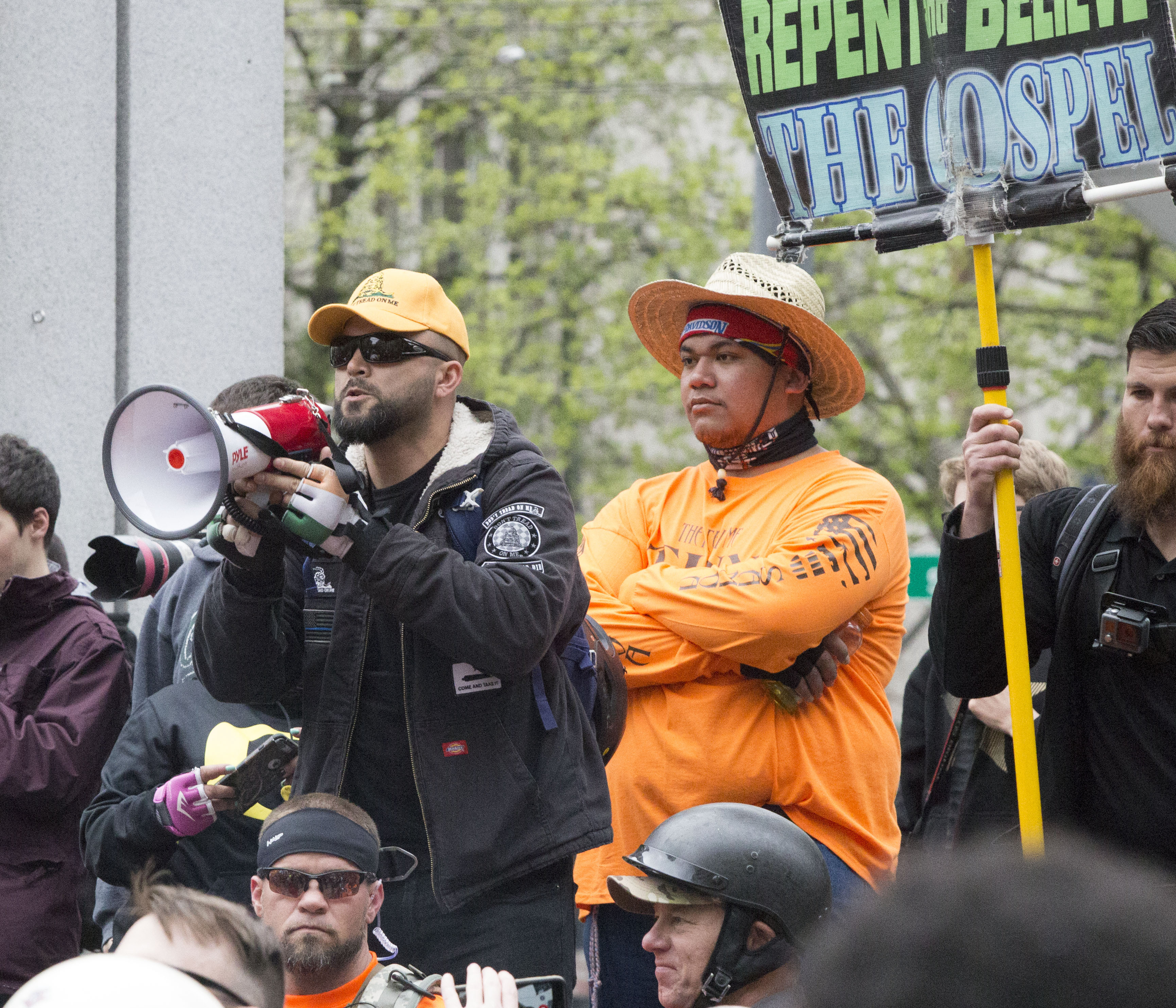
Toese at a Patriot Prayer rally in Seattle, Washington in 2017

Toese, a resident of Vancouver, Washington, became involved with the far-right group Patriot Prayer in 2017. He is originally from American Samoa. Toese, a friend of Patriot Prayer founder Joey Gibson, punched a man in the face during a Portland, Oregon rally in Chapman Square on May 13, 2017. Described as "a regular presence at alt-right events in Portland throughout the year", Toese was detained and first cited for a crime at a rally for Patriot Prayer in August 2017. He was then arrested at another Patriot Prayer rally on December 9, 2017, after he struck a counter-protester in the face. He was convicted of harassment stemming from the fight at the December 2017 rally in downtown Portland.

Toese is affiliated with both Patriot Prayer and the Proud Boys. In January 2018, he led a group of Proud Boys in a counter protest at the 2018 Women's March in Seattle alongside members of Patriot Prayer. The Proud Boys, some wearing shirts that targeted feminists as "parasites of the patriarchy", shouted misogynistic slurs at the women attending the event.

The Southern Poverty Law Center described Toese as Gibson's right-hand man in 2018.

In May 2018, when in the company of several Proud Boys members, Toese was filmed getting into a physical altercation with a teenager at the Vancouver Mall in Clark County, Washington before security officers intervened and separated them.

Toese appeared at a Patriot Prayer rally in August 2018 wearing a shirt printed with "Pinochet was right" and RWDS, shorthand used by the Proud Boys for "right wing death squad". The following month, he traveled to Austin, Texas with Gibson for a "Free Alex Jones" demonstration (an event protesting the removal of Jones, a conspiracy theorist and radio host, from several social media platforms) where police removed Toese after he threatened bystanders.

The BBC reported that, by March 2019, Toese had been arrested 18 times, on charges including assault, harassment and disorderly conduct.

Toese was indicted by a grand jury and charged with assault following a June 8, 2018, incident in Portland, Oregon that left a man with "stitches and a concussion". He was arrested on October 4, 2019, at Portland International Airport when returning from American Samoa. He was charged with felony assault.

He pleaded guilty to misdemeanor assault in January 2020 and was barred from attending protests for two years. In June 2020, Toese was filmed engaging in a fight outside Seattle's Capitol Hill Occupied Protest (CHOP) zone.

In October 2020, Toese was sentenced to six months in jail for a probation violation related to the 2018 conviction for misdemeanor assault.

Toese was among the speakers at a Proud Boys event in Portland dubbed "The Summer of Love" on August 22, 2021, that ended in a brawl in the Parkrose neighborhood with shots fired in downtown Portland. Proud Boys and anti-fascist counter protesters deployed bear mace and shot paintballs at each other. After they flipped over a white van and smashed the windows out, the Proud Boys including Toese were observed shooting paintballs at people while driving around the suburban, residential Parkrose neighborhood.

Toese was reportedly shot in the ankle during an anti-COVID lockdown protest in Olympia, Washington on September 4, 2021.

On September 10, 2021, he appeared at an anti-mask demonstration at Skyview High School in Vancouver, Washington alongside Gibson.

== December 2021 arrest and conviction ==
Toese was arrested in December 2021 in connection with the August rally in East Portland which occurred earlier that same year. He was extradited from Washington to Oregon and charged with three counts of second-degree assault with a weapon, two counts of third-degree assault, two counts of unlawful use of a weapon, two counts of riot and two counts of first-degree criminal mischief in Multnomah County Circuit Court.

Toese was released from county jail on bail around June 8, 2022, and court records from November 15, 2022, allege that he was not returning calls to his pre-trial release officer and had let his GPS ankle monitor go dead.

On March 2, 2023, Toese was found guilty on two counts each of second-degree assault with a weapon, third-degree assault, unlawful use of a weapon, riot and first-degree criminal mischief. One count of second-degree assault was dropped. Under Oregon's Measure 11 guidelines, second-degree assault is a felony carrying a mandatory minimum sentence of five years and 10 months in state prison. On July 21, 2023, a judge sentenced Toese to 95 months in prison. As of August 29, 2023, he was being held at the Snake River Correctional Institution, with his earliest possible release date set for April 30, 2030.
