= Patriot Prayer =

American far-right political group

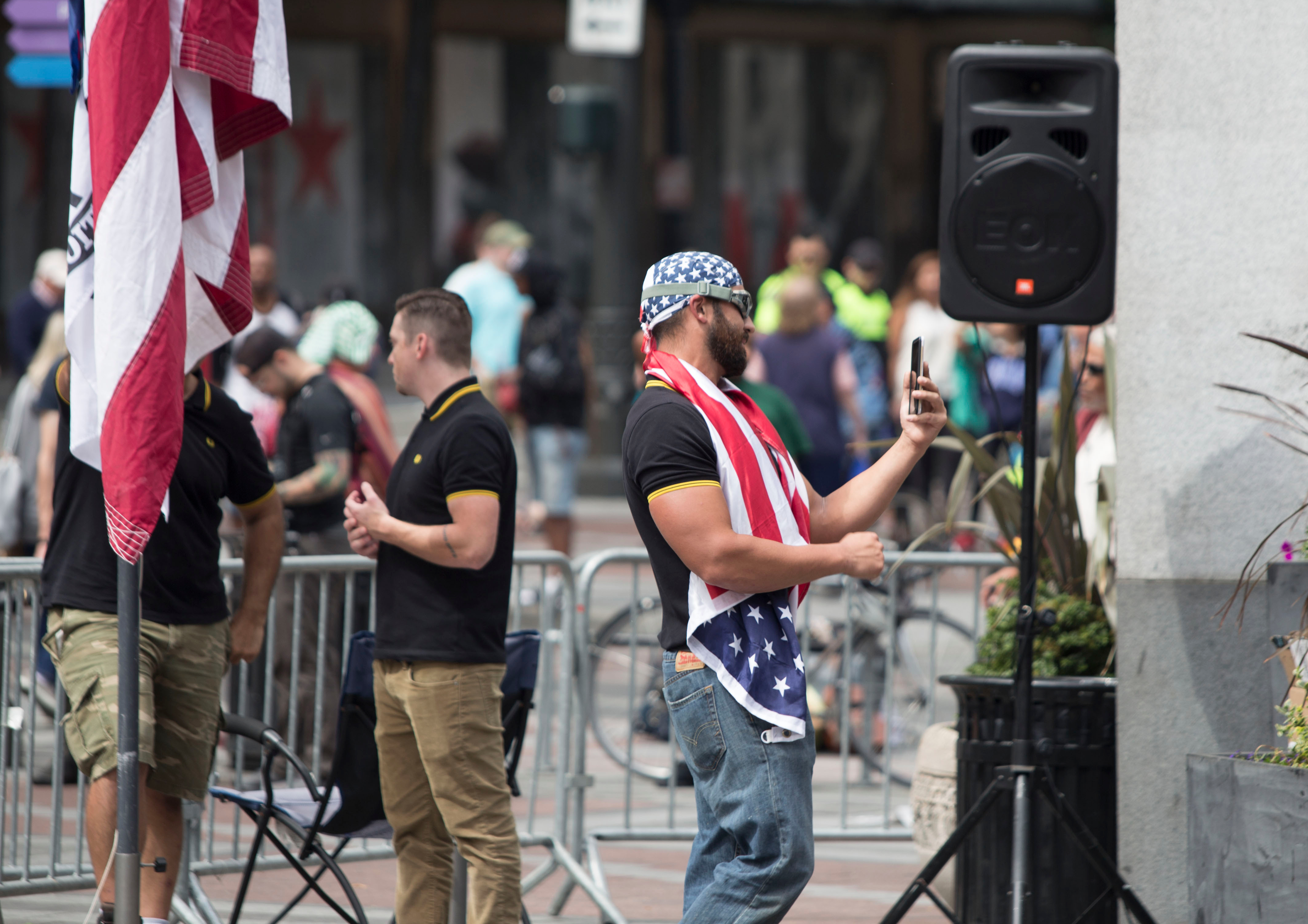
- Joey Gibson, founder of Patriot Prayer, at a 2017 Seattle rally with Proud Boys members
- Formation: June 2016; 10 years ago
- Founder: Joey Gibson
- Type: Far-right group
- Location: Vancouver, Washington
- Region served: Pacific Northwest; United States

Patriot Prayer is an American far-right group founded by Joey Gibson in 2016 and based in Vancouver, Washington, a suburban city in the Portland metropolitan area. Since 2016, the group has organized several dozen pro-gun, pro-Trump rallies held in cities in the Pacific Northwest and Northern California. Often met with large numbers of counter-protesters, attendees have repeatedly clashed with left-wing groups in the Portland area. Far-right groups, such as the Proud Boys, have attended the rallies organized by Patriot Prayer, as well as white nationalists, sparking controversy and violence.

Patriot Prayer has focused on fighting anti-fascist and leftist groups; street fights between the groups, which have taken place since 2017, have frequently been filmed and posted online by observers and members. A brawl between Patriot Prayer and anti-fascist activists at Cider Riot in May 2019 led to criminal proceedings against members of the group. Three people pleaded guilty, while Gibson and another member were acquitted of their charges.

Patriot Prayer has described itself as in favor of free speech and opposed to big government. An infiltrator into Patriot Prayer said that the group had around 15 core members in 2019.

== Overview ==
Patriot Prayer was founded in 2016 by Joey Gibson. Gibson was motivated to become an activist after he viewed TV coverage of a June 2, 2016, Trump rally in San Jose, California, where protests turned to brawling. Since early 2017, Patriot Prayer supporters have traveled to downtown Portland to hold rallies in support of Donald Trump. Patriot Prayer is a far-right group, part of the right-wing of American politics. The group has held rallies in areas known for their liberal politics. It has also been described as anti-government. The San Jose Mercury News described Patriot Prayer as a right-wing group whose events "attracted white supremacists and ended up in violent confrontations among demonstrators on both sides." In 2017, Gibson considered himself a conservative libertarian.

Patriot Prayer has been connected to the alt-right and other far-right groups. Gibson denied that the group was white nationalist and claimed that they supported "freedom, love and peace". The group's stated aim is the support of the First Amendment, free speech and to "liberate the conservatives on the West Coast".

Patriot Prayer is known for being a "pro-Trump group". The Weekly Standard described early Patriot Prayer rallies as having "overtly pro-Trump themes."

Opposition to Gibson's rallies grew in May 2017 following the 2017 Portland train attack, a racially motivated double murder by Jeremy Christian, a man known to have attended Patriot Prayer rallies.

In August 2017, David Neiwert, writing for the Southern Poverty Law Center (SPLC), described Patriot Prayer as "trolling" the Pacific Northwest with the intention of provoking a response from antifa. Neiwert noted that Gibson denounced white supremacists and neo-Nazis after the Unite the Right Rally and stated that he aimed to "actively exclude" white supremacist groups. Members of Identity Evropa have attended the groups rallies. The SPLC referred to Patriot Prayer as "violent extremists".

In 2018, authorities were prompted to investigate after Patriot Prayer called the Council on American–Islamic Relations a "Muslim extremist organization" and made online threats against the group. Patriot Prayer has harassed and assaulted Abolish ICE and other leftist activists.

The group has also attracted anti-government paramilitary groups like the Oath Keepers and Three Percenters.

=== Organizational structure, membership and recruitment ===
For a period beginning in February 2019, Patriot Prayer was a corporation, but on September 18, 2019, it was voluntarily dissolved. In October 2019, Gibson advised followers to send him donations through the Church of Faith and Freedom, an organization that officials who oversee charities and non-profits found no record of in the states it claimed to be active: California, Oregon, and Washington.

Crosscut described Gibson as "the man who seems to run everything." An infiltrator into Patriot Prayer said that the group had around 15 core members in 2019. Members of the group have included Tusitala "Tiny" Toese, a one-time close confidant of Gibson who has faced multiple criminal charges for violence and Chandler Pappas who was indicted by a grand jury on eight felony charges in 2021 for his role in the breach of the Oregon state capitol. Toese is also a leader of the Proud Boys. Ethan Nordean, a Proud Boy indicted on federal charges for his involvement in the 2021 United States Capitol attack, began attending Patriot Prayer rallies in 2017. Six individuals affiliated with Patriot Prayer, including Gibson, were indicted on felony rioting charges following a brawl between Patriot Prayer and patrons of Cider Riot, a Portland cider house, on May 1, 2019; several members pleaded guilty to the charges. In July 2022, Gibson was acquitted of the charges.

Several crowdfunding websites removed Gibson and Patriot Prayer from their platforms, including GivingFuel in November 2018, Go Get Funding in September 2019, and GoFundMe by October 2019.

Patriot Prayer had often used Facebook to recruit attendees. In September 2020, Facebook took down the pages for Patriot Prayer and Gibson as part of their efforts to remove "violent social militias" from its social networks.

== Activities and events ==
Starting in 2016, Patriot Prayer has hosted dozens of pro-gun and pro-Trump rallies in the Pacific Northwest. The attendees of Patriot Prayer's rallies, known to draw supporters from Proud Boys and other anti-government extremist groups, have repeatedly clashed with left-wing groups in the Portland, Oregon, area.

Prior to the violence at the Unite the Right rally in Charlottesville, Virginia, Patriot Prayer's rallies featured "right-wing nationalists". Since Charlottesville, the group has tried to distance themselves from the alt-right. Rose City Antifa organized opposition to Patriot Prayer rallies in Portland.

=== 2017–2018 ===
==== April "Rally for Trump and Freedom" Portland ====
On April 2, 2017, Patriot Prayer held a "Rally for Trump and Freedom", attended by approximately 300 people. Supporters of President Donald Trump were confronted by anarchists during a pro-Trump rally at Vancouver's Esther Short Park, north of Portland. Security for the rally was provided by the Three Percenters militia group.

==== April "March for Free Speech" Portland ====
Following the cancellation of a Rose Festival event due to threats of violence, allegedly from anti-fascists, against expected rally participants the Multnomah County Republican Party, Gibson organized a "March for Free Speech" to occur on April 29, 2017. Gibson told The Guardian: "We are going to continue with our rally. There is no way that we will stop. It is even more important that we come out with a strong message of love." There were an estimated 60 counter-protesters, and police made three arrests. At the march yelling racial slurs was Jeremy Christian who was later arrested for the 2017 Portland train attack where two men were fatally stabbed. Gibson denounced Christian's actions and said he ejected Christian from the April 29 rally due to his "bizarre behavior".

==== May "Stand Against Communism" rally Seattle ====
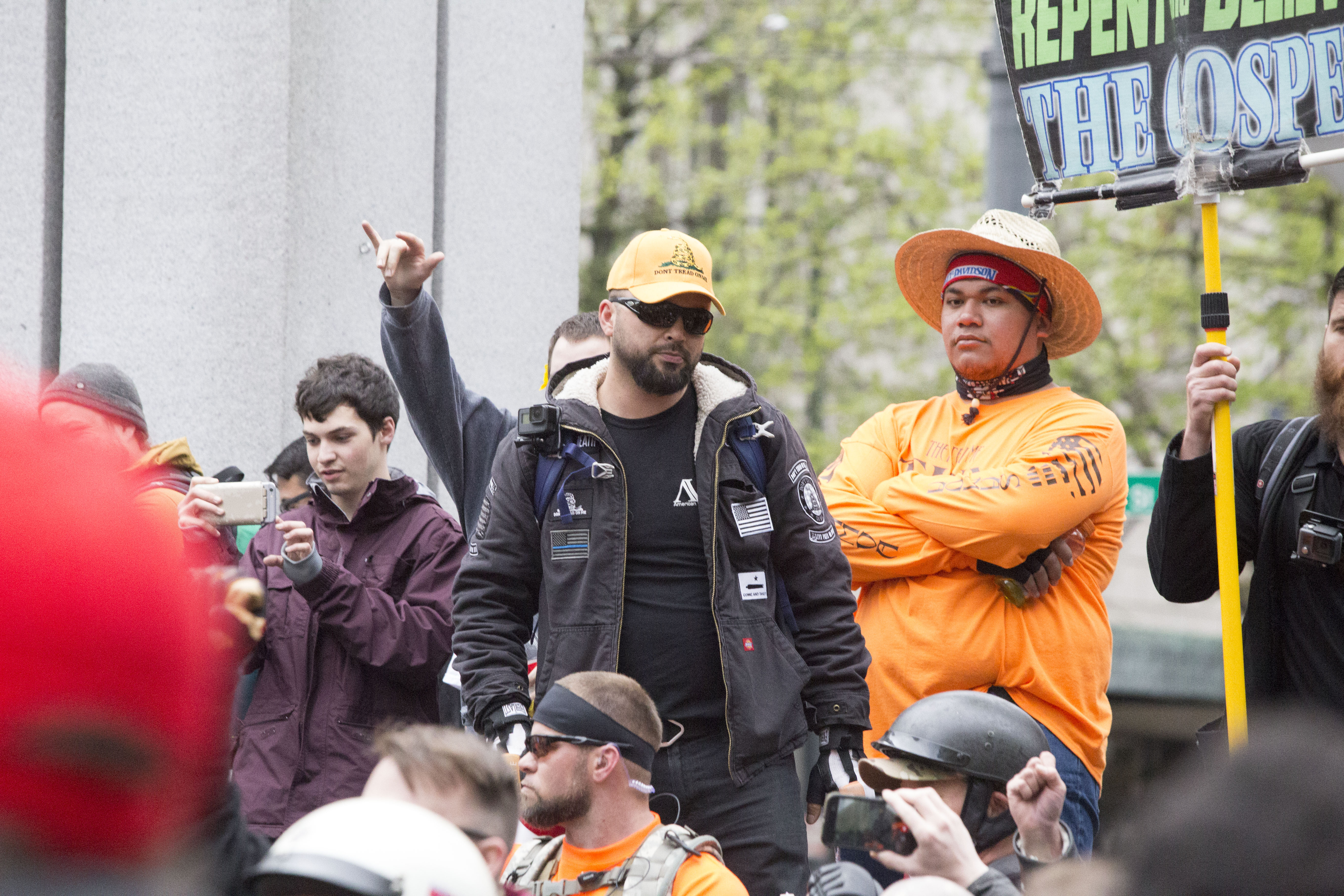
Gibson (center) and Toese (right) at a Patriot Prayer rally in Seattle on May 1, 2017

On May 1, 2017, Patriot Prayer counter-protested at Seattle's May Day parade with their "Stand Against Communism" rally. The events were mostly peaceful, with arrests of counter-protesters.

On May 11 and 13, 2017, Patriot Prayer organized the attendance of a dozen "antifa watchers" at a protest at a south-east Portland grocery liquidator. Interviewed by The Oregonian, Gibson said the group were there to watch the protest and report any property damage, and that he intended "to start conversations".

==== June "Trump Free Speech Rally" Portland ====
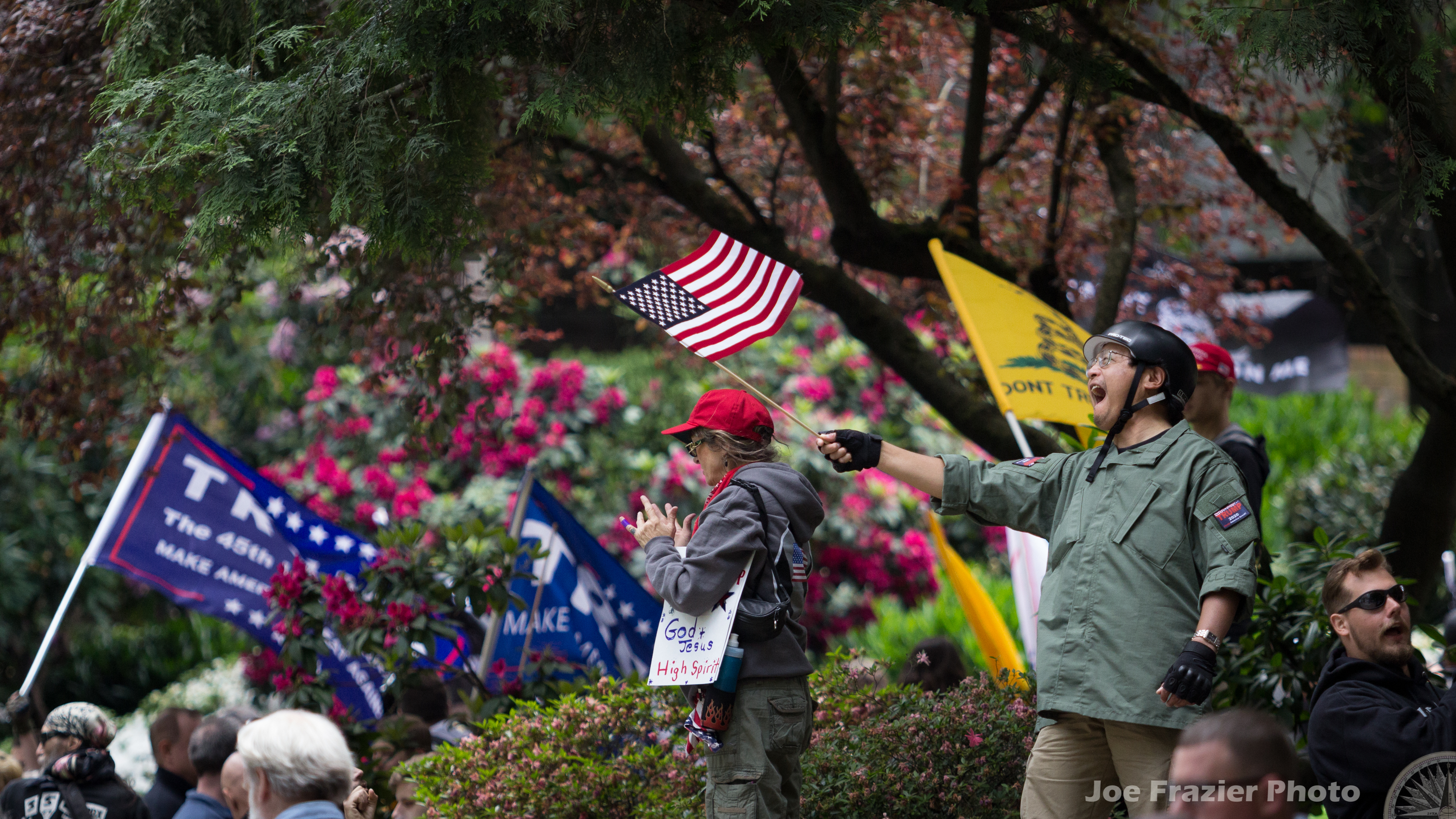
Protesters at Patriot Prayer's "Trump Free Speech Rally" June 4, 2017

A June 4, 2017 "Trump Free Speech Rally" in downtown Portland attracted a large counter-protest and 14 people were arrested after Portland's mayor Ted Wheeler unsuccessfully sought to have the event's permit revoked. The Washington Post, stated that the event provided "a vivid illustration of the city's divisions". The rally caused controversy as it was scheduled one week after the stabbings by Jeremy Christian. The mayor of Portland, Ted Wheeler, had requested that federal authorities revoke the permit, saying he was concerned over increasing tensions in the city due to the stabbings. The General Services Administration denied the request, stating that the permit had been lawfully obtained weeks beforehand. The Oregon chapter of the American Civil Liberties Union's legal director, Mat Dos Santos, said it was unconstitutional of Wheeler to attempt to prevent the demonstration based on the political and personal viewpoints of those who organized the event. Gibson canceled the event citing safety concerns.

==== June "Free speech Evergreen State College" rally in Olympia, Washington ====
External videos
- Evergreen State 'Patriot' Protest Organizer Meets the Opposition, and Pepper Spray. June 16, 2017. Southern Poverty Law Center run time 9:39

On June 15, 2017, Patriot Prayer members held a rally at Evergreen State College shortly after the university became the focus of a national controversy over how academic institutions handled issues of race. Patriot Prayer promoted solidarity with Bret Weinstein, whose critical comments about an event for racial awareness had ignited the 2017 campus protests. The campus had been closed twice in early June over safety concerns after a man called in threatening a mass shooting on school grounds aimed at leftists; officials closed the campus early once they learned of the rally planned for June 15.

Patriot Prayer promoted their event as a "March Against Evergreen State College" which was changed to "Free Speech Evergreen State College". State troopers in riot gear worked to keep the peace as several dozen Patriot Prayer members and supporters were met by over 100 counter-protesters made up of Evergreen students, faculty, and anti-fascists, including some from the Evergreen Anti-Fascist Community Defense Network. Patriot Prayer members were sprayed with silly string and after repeatedly advancing into the opposition, Gibson was also pepper-sprayed.

==== June/August "Freedom Marches" Portland ====
On June 30, 2017, Patriot Prayer's self-titled "Freedom March", held at the Portland Waterfront near the annual Blues Festival, was met by counter-protesters. The often heated exchanges of the dueling rallies ended with minimal violence and no reports of arrests. The rally occurred during national debate on the First Amendment, where violent clashes between right-wing and left-wing groups occurred over appearances by contentious public figures, often in liberal cities such as Portland. The atmosphere in Portland was also tense due to the recent arrest of Christian for the train attack.

On August 6, 2017, smaller crowds appeared for a Patriot Prayer's Salmon Street Springs "Freedom March" in Portland. The event, in which counter-protesters met, followed the previous pattern of shouting and chants from both sides, with few arrests.

==== August "Freedom Rally Seattle" ====
On August 13, 2017, the group held the "Freedom Rally Seattle" at Westlake Park with a large police presence to keep thousands of counter-protesters away. The concurrent events came one day after the death and injuries in the Unite the Right rally in Charlottesville, and tensions were high with arrests of counter-protesters made by police.

==== August San Francisco events ====
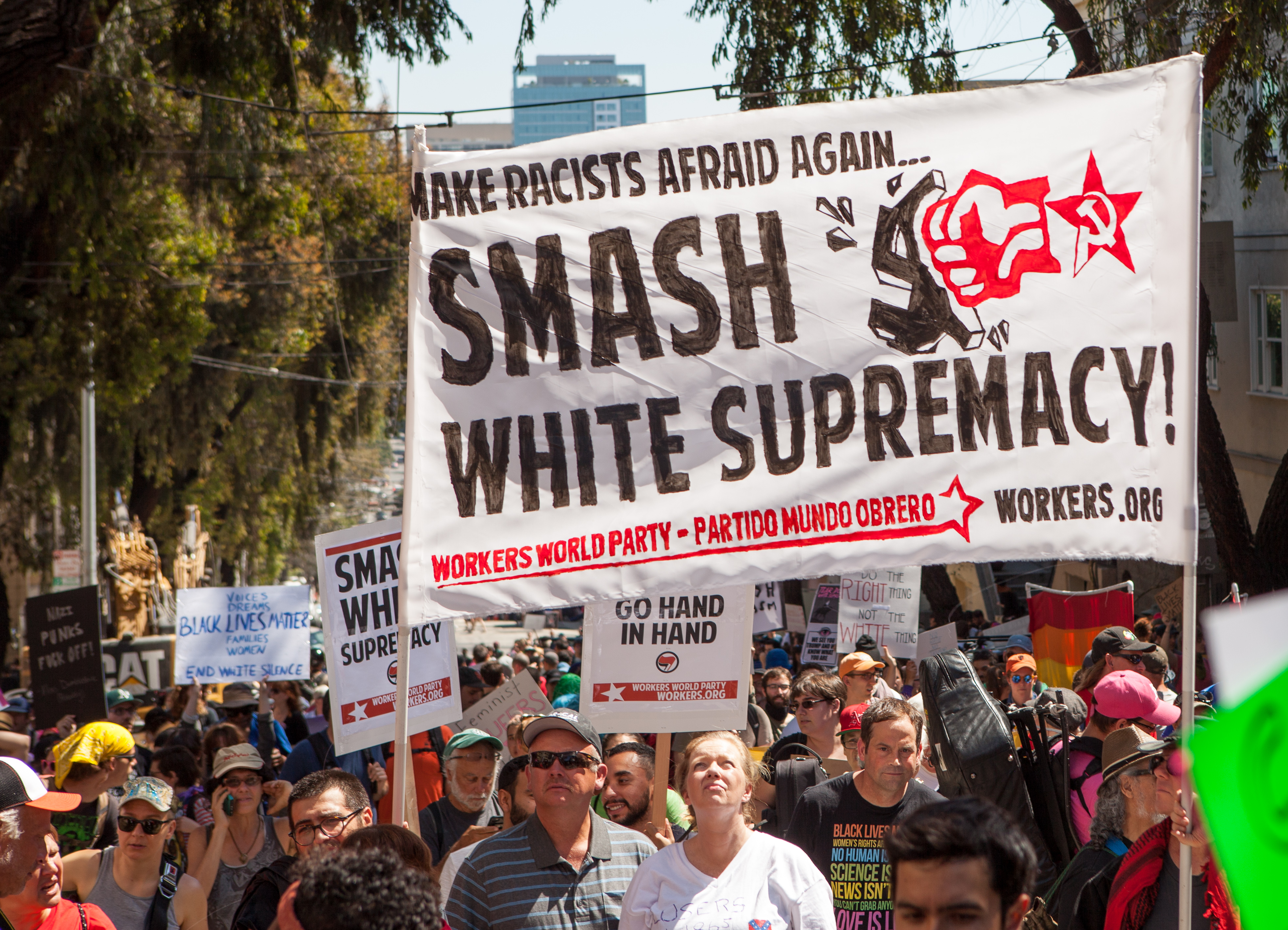
San Francisco Counterprotest to Patriot Prayer in August 2017

Patriot Prayer planned an August 26, 2017 event to be held at Crissy Field in San Francisco. Crissy Field, administered by the National Park Service, granted Patriot Prayer a permit to march. The city called in its entire police force in anticipation of unrest similar to previous Patriot Prayer rallies in Seattle and Portland. Nancy Pelosi said the event was intended to be a "white supremacist rally". Police Chief Bill Scott and Board of Supervisors President London Breed wrote a letter to express their outrage over the National Park Service's decision to allow the rally. Patriot Prayer security for the event was to be handled by armed Oath Keepers. Mayor Ed Lee condemned the event, referring to is as part of a "shameful, anti-American trend of hate-filled extremist rallies." Lee added that "San Francisco does not welcome outside agitators whose messages of hate have the sole purpose of inciting violence." After it attracted over 1,000 counter-protesters, Patriot Prayer canceled their event and opted to hold a press conference at Alamo Square Park. In rapid response, the city of San Francisco built fences around the park and closed it to the public to prevent violence, which prompted Gibson to also cancel that event. Gibson stated that Patriot Prayer members would attend a "No to Marxism" rally near the University of California, Berkeley; that event was also called off by its organizer. Time reported that many feared a repeat of the deadly clash between white nationalists and counter-protesters that had occurred at the Unite the Right rally in Charlottesville earlier that month. The counter-demonstrations across the San Francisco Bay Area went ahead peacefully with most participants opting to hold a large dance party instead of a violent confrontation.

The news of a planned Patriot Prayer press conference in San Francisco's Alamo Square Park drew counter-protesters to the area. The group, which had already canceled a planned rally at Crissy Field due to alleged safety concerns, held the press conference in Pacifica instead. Before the event, Gibson denounced white supremacists saying: "Don't show up, you're not welcome." Group organizers arrived at Crissy Field later that afternoon to talk with counter-protesters.

==== September "Peaceful Portland Freedom March" ====
For the September 10, 2017, "Peaceful Portland Freedom March" in Portland, Gibson asked followers take a new non-violent approach, although not all appeared willing to go along. Counter-protests appeared to arrive at a number of different stances that were dependent on the organization. Patriot Prayer announced changes, including the collection of charitable relief for the victims of the Eagle Creek fire and a name change for a rally to "Peaceful Vancouver Freedom March". The small rallies drew large counter-protest crowds in both Portland and Vancouver with several arrests and the detention of a pickup truck driver who sped through a crowd of counter-protesters. Among those drawn to the rallies were the militia-style Three Percenters and the Proud Boys, a white nationalist group.

==== September event Berkley, California ====
A September 26, 2017, Patriot Prayer demonstration near Sproul Plaza resulted in violence between the group and left-wing activists, including BAMN. The demonstration continued in a march to People's Park, where the speakers included Kyle "Stickman" Chapman, a self-described American nationalist, who claimed there was "a war on whites" and a "battle for Berkeley". Police made three arrests, including Yvette Felarca.

=== 2018–2019 ===
==== January counter-demonstration at the Women's March Seattle ====
Patriot Prayer and the Proud Boys appeared at the 2018 Women's March in Seattle. Led by Tusitala Toese, the Proud Boys were seen wearing shirts that targeted feminists as "parasites of the patriarchy" while both groups shouted misogynistic slurs at the women attending the event.

==== February "Freedom Rally" Seattle ====
On February 10, 2018, Patriot Prayer was invited by the University of Washington College Republicans to speak at their "Freedom Rally" in Red Square. Several groups organized counter-protests, leading to skirmishes. Five people were arrested.

==== May Day rally Seattle ====
Gibson held a Patriot Prayer rally in downtown Seattle on May 1, 2018, during the annual left-wing events for May Day. At the rally, Gibson openly endorsed the Proud Boys (several of whom shared the stage with him) and spoke about his campaign as a Republican for the U.S. Senate. The 2018 event was accompanied by a heavy police presence and remained largely peaceful.

==== June rallies in Portland ====
On June 3, 2018, Patriot Prayer and anti-fascists fought in downtown Portland parks, where police made four arrests for disorderly conduct. Participants threw rocks, bottles, ball bearings, and fireworks at each other. Patriot Prayer organized the event to counter a rally led by Empower Portland Alliance and Direct Action Alliance, an event held to protest police violence and commemorate the anniversary of an incident where Portland police detained 200 people for several hours. In response to Patriot Prayer, local antifa groups organized another counter-protest, calling this third rally "Call to Resist Patriot Prayer Bringing Nazis to Portland." Multnomah County sheriff's deputy and demonstrators deployed pepper spray.

On June 30, 2018, a Patriot Prayer rally with 150 supporters clashed with anti-fascist activists waiting at a street barricade. Police observed "assaults, criminal behavior, and projectiles being thrown". Reports suggested that the counter-protesters initiated the violence with thrown projectiles. Police, who declared the Patriot Prayer rally a riot, fired non-lethal ammunition towards counter-protestors and arrested nine people. Prior to the June 30, 2018 rally, Gibson issued a national call for participation that over 60 Proud Boys answered. Video showed Proud Boys member Ethan Nordean shoving one counter protester to the ground before another approached with a metal baton. Due to shin guards on his forearms, Nordean deflected the baton, then punched the man in the face, knocking him to the ground unconscious. According to a police report, the counter-protester was hospitalized with a concussion. Video of Nordean assaulting the counter-protester was utilized as a recruitment tool by the Proud Boys. When Nordean appeared on the July 17 edition of InfoWars' The Alex Jones Show, the video played continuously in the background while he promoted the next Portland march scheduled for August 4 stating "if you want to get involved, there is no better time than now."

==== August "Gibson for Senate Freedom March" Portland ====
External videos
- Patriot Prayer is dragging Antifa into an unwinnable PR war. August 7, 2018. Vice News on HBO

On August 4, 2018, the "Gibson for Senate Freedom March", which included members of the Proud Boys, was held in Portland along Tom McCall Waterfront Park. It attracted counter-protestors from labor groups, a local Democratic Socialists of America chapter, clergy, antifa activists, and community groups. Hundreds of police in riot gear, from the Portland Police Bureau (PPB) and the Oregon State Police, used rubber bullets and flashbangs in an attempt to keep the opposing groups apart. Rocks and bottles reportedly hit police. They confiscated weapons including fireworks, long sticks, baseball bats, pepper spray and home-made shields. Patriot Prayer attracted some 400 supporters for the rally from across the nation, with many wearing Proud Boys colors, Trump-branded merchandise, InfoWars merchandise, or the slogan "RWDS" (Right-Wing Death Squad). Patriot Prayer member and known brawler Tusitala "Tiny" Toese was seen at the event wearing a "Pinochet Did Nothing Wrong" shirt.

Portland police later reported they had encountered Patriot Prayer members with loaded firearms on the roof of a parking garage overlooking the August 4 protest site. Although the individuals had concealed carry permits, police confiscated the weapons and cleared the roof before the protest scheduled for the afternoon.

==== August "Liberty or Death" rally Seattle ====
On August 18, 2018, Patriot Prayer and the Washington Three Percenters held a "Liberty or Death" rally in Seattle. The right-wing supporters, some armed and in tactical gear, were met with a counter-protest from Organized Workers for Labor Solidarity, Radical Women and the Freedom Socialist Party. Three people were arrested.

On November 17, 2018, an offshoot of Patriot Prayer scheduled a HimToo rally at Terry Schrunk Plaza in downtown Portland and was met with counter-protestors.

=== 2019–2020 ===
==== January doxing campaign Portland ====
In January 2019, Patriot Prayer leader Joey Gibson, Proud Boy Tusitala "Tiny" Toese, and former Proud Boy Russell Schultz initiated a campaign to tear off the bandanas of antifa demonstrators to take pictures of their faces to doxx them. The "demasking" announcement followed an altercation when Patriot Prayer and Proud Boys members attempted to invade a chapter meeting of the Democratic Socialists of America. After being denied entry to the meeting, the group clashed with nearby anti-fascist activists and claimed to be attacked.

==== May Day brawl at Cider Riot Portland ====
On May 1, 2019, following a full day of public demonstrations and counter-protests in Portland for International Workers Day or May Day, a brawl between Patriot Prayer and anti-fascist cider house patrons took place outside Cider Riot in the early evening. A police detective described video of Gibson, "taunting" and threatening members of antifa and later "physically pushing" a woman before she was hit with a baton and knocked unconscious by someone else.

Gibson and five other Patriot Prayer affiliates were arrested for their actions in connection with the May Day riot. Three Patriot Prayer members pleaded guilty to misdemeanor assault charges in January 2020. Another man with ties to Patriot Prayer, Ian Kramer, pleaded guilty in May 2021 to one count each of riot, second-degree assault, and unlawful use of a weapon for beating a woman with a baton and breaking her vertebra. Gibson and another member were acquitted of felony riot charges in July 2022, and the judge rebuked the district attorney's office for pursuing a trial on the evidence presented.

In 2026, a jury awarded the man who owned Cider Riot at the time, Abram Goldman-Armstrong, $760,000 in a lawsuit against Patriot Prayer members.

=== 2020– ===
In January 2020, Gibson appeared at a gun rights rally held on Martin Luther King Jr. day in Richmond, VA.

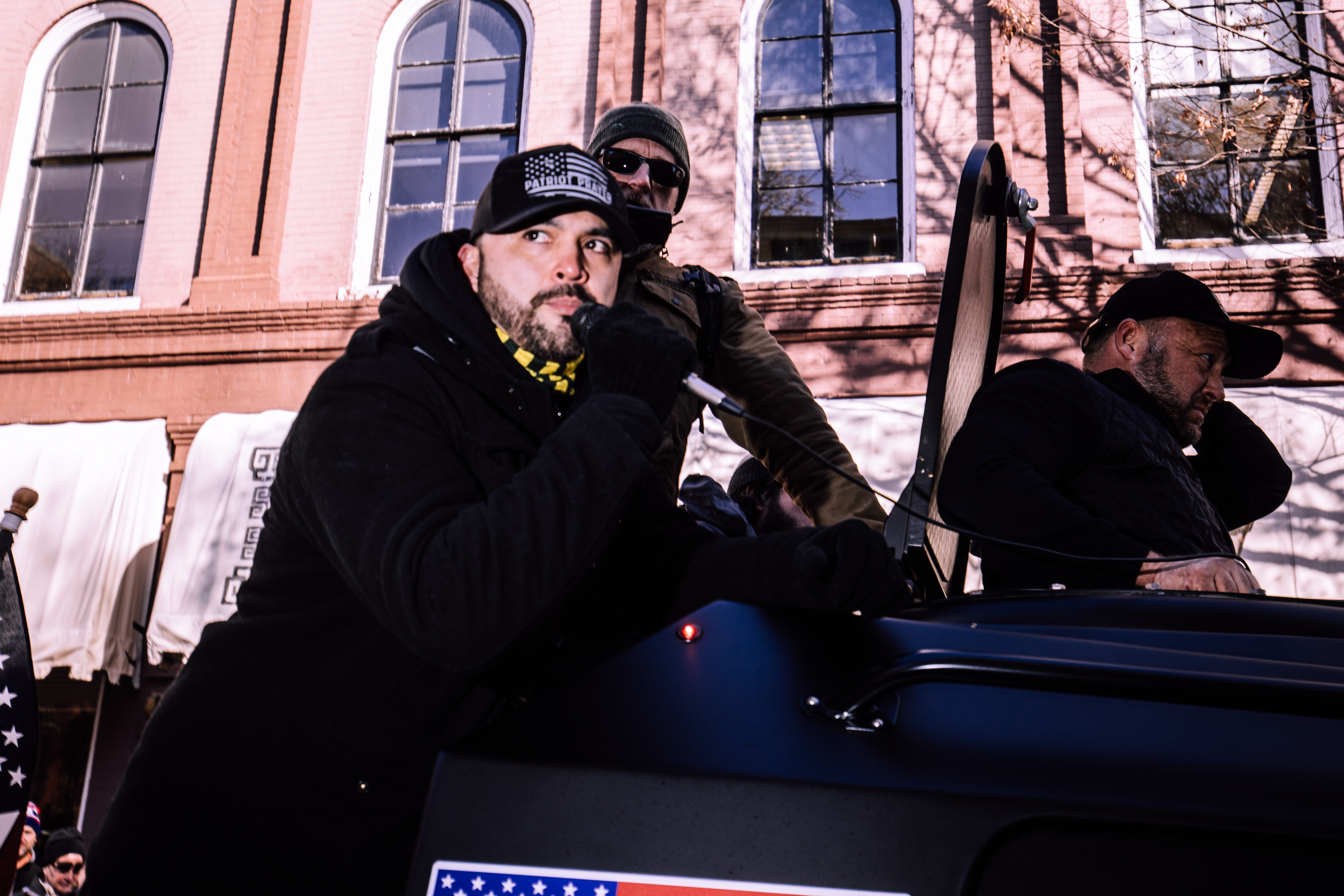
Gibson in 2020 at a gun rights rally in Richmond, Virginia

==== Events related to George Floyd Protests in Portland ====
On August 29, 2020, Aaron Danielson, a Patriot Prayer supporter, was shot and killed after participating in a pro-Trump "caravan" during the ongoing George Floyd Protests in Portland. The alleged shooter, Michael Reinoehl, charged by police with second-degree murder, and a self-described antifa supporter, was shot and killed by police.

==== COVID-19 restriction protests ====
In late 2020, Patriot Prayer organized a rally to protest COVID-19 public health restrictions in Washington state. Gibson participated in and promoted several events that took place at state Capitol buildings and governor's mansions in Washington and Oregon. In November, he led a rally at the private residence of a Washington State Liquor and Cannabis Board officer, in opposition to business restrictions imposed in Washington state for the coronavirus pandemic.

At a December 2020 rally at the Oregon State Capitol in Salem organized by Patriot Prayer, protesters used chemical agents against troopers, and some entered the building unlawfully, resulting in several arrests.

== Relationship with the Portland police ==
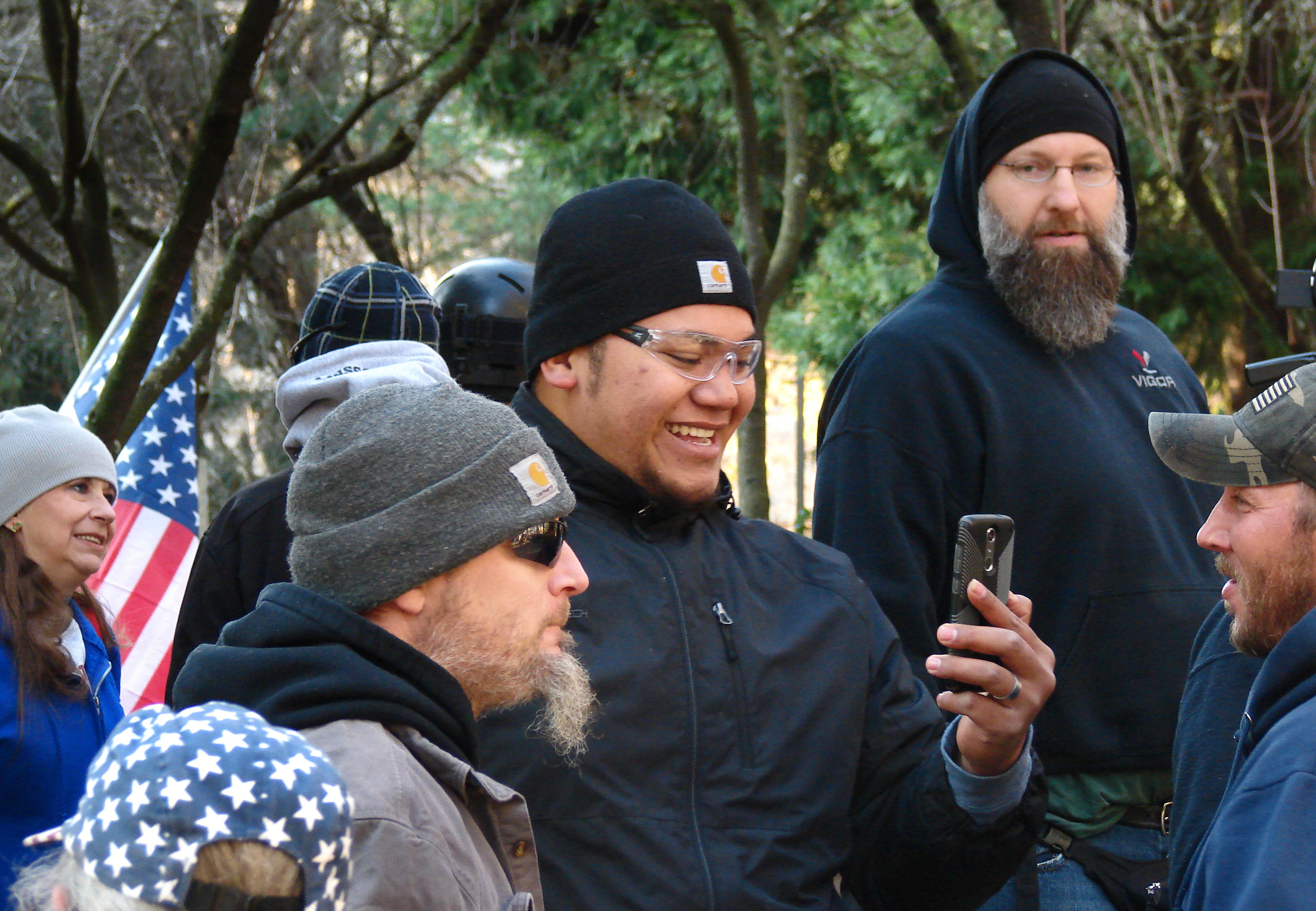
Patriot Prayer gather in 2017, Tusitala Toese at center

The Guardian reported that Lt. Niiya told Gibson in December 2017 that the police would not execute a warrant for the arrest of Toese. In a text, Niiya wrote: "Just make sure he doesn't do anything which may draw our attention. [...] If he still has the warrant in the system (I don't run you guys so I don't personally know) the officers could arrest him. I don't see a need to arrest on the warrant unless there is a reason." He also indicated that police officers had ignored previous arrest warrants for Toese.

In February 2019, Willamette Week reported that Portland police lieutenant Jeff Niiya kept in close touch with Gibson and provided him with intelligence about the anti-fascist movement in the city. He also advised Gibson on how a Patriot Prayer member could avoid arrest. On February 21, a public "listening session" convened by the Portland Police Bureau consisted in large part of strong criticism of the bureau.

On March 1, 2019, The Guardian obtained video that showed Portland police officers approaching Gibson at a June 3, 2018 rally, telling him that although Niiya had probable cause to arrest several group members, they could avoid arrest by leaving. Officers informed Gibson that Tusitala "Tiny" Toese and another man would be arrested, and told him that they had already arrested members of "the other side". Five days after the rally, Toese and Proud Boys member Donovan Flippo, allegedly attacked a man in Portland, an incident for which a grand jury indicted for them.

Portland's Independent Police Review investigated Niiya and cleared him in September 2019, determining that he was gathering information on the groups and trying to defuse potential clashes with his advice.

== See also ==
- Andy Ngo
