= Joey Gibson (political activist) =

American right-wing activist (born 1983)

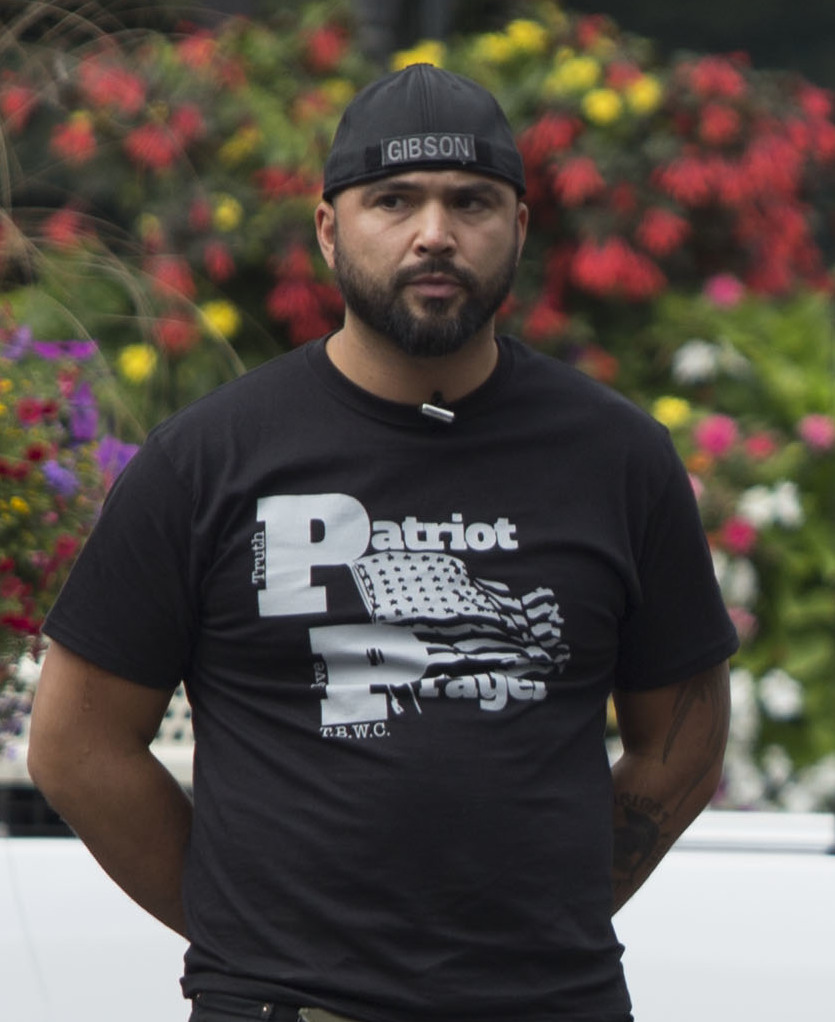
- Gibson in 2017

Personal details
- Born: November 8, 1983 (age 42) Camas, Washington, U.S.
- Party: Republican
- Education: Central Washington University
- Known for: Founder of Patriot Prayer

Joseph Owan Gibson (born November 8, 1983) is an American right-wing activist and the founder of the far-right group Patriot Prayer, which is active in Portland, Oregon and other cities within the Pacific Northwest.

== Early life and education ==
Gibson was born in Clark County, Washington to an Irish father and Japanese mother. He grew up in Camas, Washington with two siblings in a Catholic household. He played high school football at Camas High School and was a quarterback before he "got in trouble with the law." After pleading guilty to a felony theft charge in 2002, Gibson was barred from owning a gun until 2015, when he petitioned Clark County to restore access. He spent some time in jail and then was homeless living in Portland, Seattle, Mexico, and Hawaii. He worked as a football coach at Skyridge Middle School and earned his GED. Gibson went on to earn a degree in psychology from Central Washington University.

== Activism ==
In 2016, Gibson founded the far-right group Patriot Prayer. Gibson was motivated to become an activist after he viewed TV coverage of a June 2, 2016, Trump rally in San Jose, California, where protests turned to brawling. At his early rallies, Gibson was known to wear a "Hillary for Prison" T-shirt.

In January 2018, Gibson along with members of Patriot Prayer and the Proud Boys, including Tusitala Toese, antagonized participants at the 2018 Women's March in Seattle.

On February 25, 2018, Gibson announced that he would be running as a Republican in the 2018 U.S. Senate election in Washington, seeking to unseat incumbent Democrat Maria Cantwell. Gibson was defeated in the primary election, receiving 2.3% of the votes cast.

During a March 2018, campaign rally in Spokane Valley, Washington, Gibson expressed opposition to Antifa, which frequently protest at his events, and stated regarding white nationalists that "I would say the same thing to them that I would say to any black nationalist or Mexican nationalists [sic] group, we have to drop the identity of politics and focus on what is on the inside." He has said freedom of speech is a central element to his platform. Gibson's views have been described as "a complicated muddle" by the Inlander and "basically Alex Jones meets Bernie Sanders" by The Stranger. The Proud Boys, another far-right group, have also been present at several of Gibson's events.

In February 2019, Willamette Week reported that a Portland police lieutenant kept in close touch with Gibson, passing on to him intelligence about the anti-fascist movement in the city, and also advised him on how a Patriot Prayer member could avoid being arrested. Portland's Independent Police Review investigated and cleared the officer because he was gathering information on the groups and trying to defuse potential clashes with his advice.

On September 4, 2020 Facebook removed Gibson's page, along with the page for Patriot Prayer, as part of its "ongoing efforts to remove violent social militias from our platforms". The company's action followed escalating tensions related to protests in Portland, Oregon, as the city continued to experience demonstrations related to the May 2020 murder of George Floyd.

Gibson appeared at a protest against COVID-19 lockdowns on December 21, 2020, in which he tried to force his way into the Oregon State Capitol during a special session of the Oregon legislature. In September 2021, Gibson demonstrated with Tusitala "Tiny" Toese at an anti-mask protest at Skyview High School in Vancouver, Washington.

=== May Day riot ===
Gibson was one of six men accused of inciting a riot between Patriot Prayer and Antifa on May Day 2019 in Northeast Portland outside of the bar Cider Riot. He was indicted for felony riot by the Multnomah County District Attorney on August 15, 2019. Gibson pleaded not guilty to the charge. In an appearance on the Lars Larson show, Gibson said he was being unfairly targeted and stated "I was on a sidewalk recording, no different than Andy Ngo."

A Portland police detective said Gibson could be seen in a video taunting and threatening members of Antifa and later pushing a woman before she was hit with a baton and knocked unconscious by someone else. During the brawl, the woman had her vertebrae broken. Cider Riot's owner sued Gibson and associates for $1 million for their actions. Gibson settled with the owners out of court in December 2025.

On September 11, 2020, Gibson filed a federal lawsuit against Multnomah County's district attorney, alleging selective prosecution based on political beliefs. A federal judge threw out his lawsuit in February 2021, partly because the court did not have jurisdiction due to the ongoing state court proceedings.

In July 2022, the trial judge acquitted Gibson of felony riot charges and rebuked the district attorney's office for pursuing a trial on the evidence presented. Based on the prosecution video of Gibson taunting Antifa protestors, the judge ruled that Gibson's activity amounted to speech, and Oregon law prohibited considering speech in deciding riot cases. Gibson sued Portland and Multnomah County officials for malicious prosecution in June 2023, seeking $100 million. The lawsuit was dismissed by a U.S. district judge in February 2024. In January 2026, the Court of Appeals for the Ninth Circuit partly reinstated the lawsuit against a prosecutor who had included the detective's testimony that Gibson taunted and threatened the members of Antifa in a probable cause affidavit for the riot charge despite conflicting video evidence.

=== Political positions ===
In 2017 and 2018, Gibson considered himself to be a moderate libertarian. His organization has been described in the media as "alt-right". Gibson has denied that his group is alt-right, and has disavowed white supremacists who frequently appear at his events. In 2017, the Anti-Defamation League described his views as appearing to be alt-lite.

Gibson expressed support for a pathway to citizenship for non-criminal undocumented immigrants, decriminalization of marijuana, and same-sex marriage. Gibson has advocated for the establishment of term limits for the U.S. Congress, for implementation of a national sales tax, and for abolition of the Internal Revenue Service. He expressed opposition for what he describes as the undue influence of the pharmaceutical industry on healthcare in the United States.
