= List of After Words interviews first aired in 2017 =

After Words is an American television series on the C-SPAN2 network’s weekend programming schedule known as Book TV. The program is an hour-long talk show, each week featuring an interview with the author of a new nonfiction book. The program has no regular host. Instead, each author is paired with a guest host who is familiar with the author or the subject matter of their book.

First air date (Links to video)	Interviewee(s)	Interviewer(s)	Book	Topic of interview / Comments
January 7, 2017	Sophie Pinkham	Alexander Cooley	Black Square: Adventures in Post-Soviet Ukraine	
January 14, 2017	Jonathan Chait	Jim Acosta	Audacity: How Barack Obama Defied His Critics and Created a Legacy That Will Prevail	
January 21, 2017	Bret Baier	Susan Eisenhower	Three Days in January: Dwight Eisenhower’s Final Mission	
January 28, 2017	Emrys Westacott	Michelle Singletary	Frugality: Why Less Is More - More or Less	
February 4, 2017	Hugh Hewitt	S.E. Cupp	The Fourth Way: The Conservative Playbook for a Lasting GOP Majority	
February 11, 2017	Melissa Fleming	Michel Gabaudan	A Hope More Powerful Than the Sea: One Refugee’s Incredible Story of Love, Loss, and Survival	
February 18, 2017	Roger Stone	Susan Ferrechio	The Making of the President 2016: How Donald Trump Orchestrated a Revolution	2016 United States presidential election, Donald Trump presidential campaign, 2016
February 25, 2017	Sybrina Fulton and Tracy Martin	Wesley Lowery	Rest in Power: The Enduring Life of Trayvon Martin	Trayvon Martin
March 4, 2017	Sophia Nelson	Michael Steele	E Pluribus ONE: Reclaiming Our Founders' Vision for a United America	
March 11, 2017	Richard Haass	Paula Dobriansky	A World in Disarray: American Foreign Policy and the Crisis of the Old Order	
March 18, 2017	Sylvia Tara	Gina Kolata	The Secret Life of Fat: The Science Behind the Body’s Least Understood Organ and What It Means for You	Body fat
March 25, 2017	Lisa Servon	Rohit Chopra	The Unbanking of America: How the New Middle Class Survives	
April 1, 2017	Sheldon Whitehouse	Eric Lipton	Captured: The Corporate Infiltration of American Democracy	
April 8, 2017	Charles Campisi	Corey Pegues	Blue on Blue: An Insider’s Story of Good Cops Catching Bad Cops	
April 15, 2017	Bill Gertz	Elise Stefanik	iWar: War and Peace in the Information Age	
April 22, 2017	Ken Buck	Fredreka Schouten	Drain the Swamp: How Washington Corruption is Worse than You Think	
April 29, 2017	John Kasich	Christine Todd Whitman	Two Paths: America Divided or United	
May 6, 2017	Helene Cooper	Karen Bass	Madame President: The Extraordinary Journey of Ellen Johnson Sirleaf	Ellen Johnson Sirleaf
May 13, 2017	Elisabeth Rosenthal	David Blumenthal	An American Sickness: How Healthcare Became Big Business and How You Can Take It Back	
May 20, 2017	Stuart Taylor	Beth Frerking	The Campus Rape Frenzy: The Attack on Due Process at America's Universities	
May 27, 2017	Chris Hayes	Elizabeth Hinton	A Colony in a Nation	
June 3, 2017	Ben Sasse	Steven Olikara	The Vanishing American Adult: Our Coming-of-Age Crisis--and How to Rebuild a Culture of Self-Reliance	
June 10, 2017	Anne-Marie Slaughter	Denis McDonough	The Chessboard and the Web: Strategies of Connection in a Networked World	
June 17, 2017	Mike Lee	Neal Katyal	Written Out of History: The Forgotten Founders Who Fought Big Government	
June 24, 2017	Rachel Schneider and Jonathan Morduch	Kathryn Edin	The Financial Diaries: How American Families Cope in a World of Uncertainty	
July 1, 2017	Heath Davis	Sarah Ellis	Beyond Trans: Does Gender Matter?	Gender identity
July 8, 2017	Brian Merchant	Steve Lohr	The One Device	History of iPhone
July 15, 2017	Naomi Klein	Medea Benjamin	No Is Not Enough: Resisting Trump’s Shock Politics and Winning the World We Need	
July 22, 2017	Sharyl Attkisson	Erik Wemple	The Smear: How Shady Political Operatives and Fake News Control What You See, What You Think, and How You Vote	
July 29, 2017	Rosa DeLauro	Aparna Mathur	The Least Among Us: Waging the Battle for the Vulnerable	
August 5, 2017	Jesse Eisinger	Jennifer Taub	The Chickenshit Club: Why the Justice Department Fails to Prosecute Executives	
August 12, 2017	Jeff Flake	S.E. Cupp	Conscience of a Conservative: A Rejection of Destructive Politics and a Return to Principle	
August 19, 2017	Milo Yiannopoulos	Marji Ross	Dangerous	
August 26, 2017	George Melloan	Rana Foroohar	Free People, Free Markets: How the Wall Street Journal Opinion Pages Shaped America	The Wall Street Journal
September 2, 2017	Mark Levin	Jim DeMint	Rediscovering Americanism: And the Tyranny of Progressivism	
September 9, 2017	Danielle Allen	Wes Moore	Cuz	
September 16, 2017	David Osborne	Chester Finn	Reinventing America’s Schools: Creating a 21st Century Education System	
September 23, 2017	Suzy Hansen	Elmira Bayrasli	Notes on a Foreign Country: An American Abroad in a Post-American World	
September 30, 2017	Art Levine	Jeffrey Lieberman	Mental Health, Inc.: How Corruption, Lax Oversight, and Failed Reforms Endanger Our Most Vulnerable Citizens	
October 7, 2017	Charles Sykes	Tammy Bruce	How the Right Lost Its Mind	
October 14, 2017	Craig Shirley	Tom Davis	Citizen Newt: the Making of a Reagan Conservative	Newt Gingrich
October 21, 2017	Gretchen Carlson	Sally Quinn	Be Fierce: Stop Harassment and Take Your Power Back	
October 29, 2017	Bob Schieffer	Susan Glasser	Overload	
November 4, 2017				
November 11, 2017	Tamer Elnoury	Michael German	American Radical: Inside the World of an Undercover Muslim FBI Agent	
November 18, 2017	Christopher Scalia	David Savage	Scalia Speaks	Antonin Scalia
November 25, 2017	Christopher Bedford	Robert Traynham	The Art of the Donald	Donald Trump
December 2, 2017	Jennet Conant	Bruce Darling	Man of the Hour	James Bryant Conant
December 9, 2017	Khizr Khan	Rep. Jimmy Panetta	An American Family	
December 16, 2017	Keith Koffler	Louie Gohmert	Bannon: Always the Rebel	Steve Bannon
December 23, 2017	Scott Kelly	Charles Bolden	Endurance: A Year in Space, a Lifetime of Discovery	
