= Responses to the alt-right =

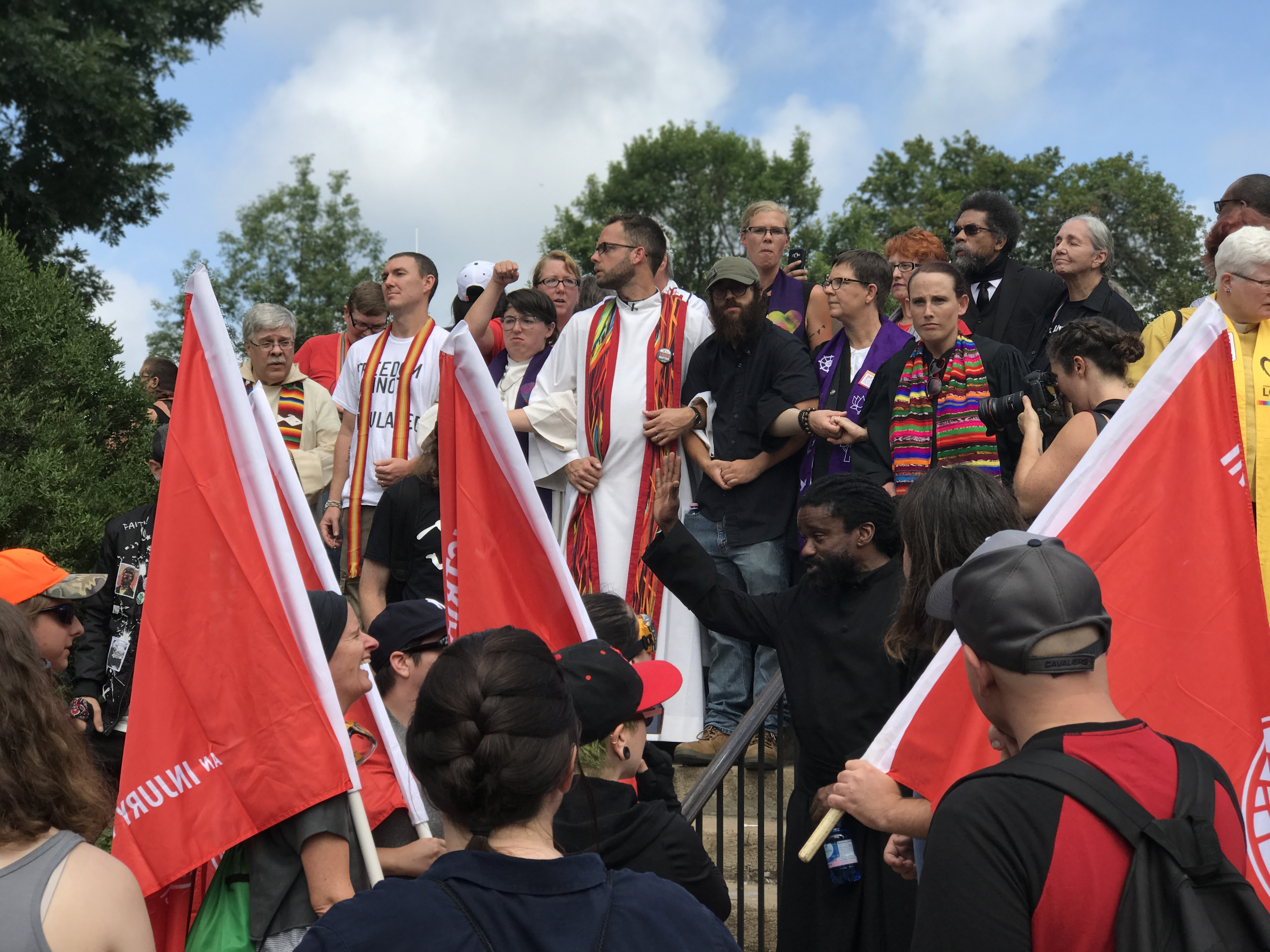
Anti-racist counter-protests at the 2017 Unite the Right rally

Opponents of the alt-right have not reached a consensus on how to deal with it. Some opponents emphasized "calling out" tactics, labelling the alt-right with terms like "racist", "sexist", "homophobic", and "white supremacist" in the belief that doing so would scare people away from it. Many commentators urged journalists not to refer to the alt-right by its chosen name, but rather with terms like "neo-Nazi". There was much discussion within U.S. public discourse as to how to avoid the "normalization" of the alt-right. The activist group Stop Normalizing, which opposes the normalization of terms like alt-right, developed the "Stop Normalizing Alt Right" Chrome extension. The extension went viral shortly after the release of Stop Normalizing's website. The extension changes the term "alt-right" on webpages to "white supremacy". The extension and group were founded by a New York-based advertising and media professional under the pseudonym George Zola.

Some on the political right, including Milo Yiannopoulos, suggest that the alt-right's appeal would be diffused if society gave in to many of its less extreme demands, including curbing political correctness and ending mass immigration. Yiannopoulos added that, as part of such an approach, the left should cease holding different social groups to different standards of behavior. He noted that if the left wanted to continue using identity politics as the basis of much of its mobilization, it would have to accept white identity politics as a permanent fixture of the political landscape. Similarly, in highlighting the commonalities between alt-right and "left-identitarian" forms of identity politics, Gray suggested the alt-right's presence might encourage "the intersectional Left and its allies" to increasingly critique the theoretical basis on which their own identity politics is built. Other commentators, like the conservative David Frum, have suggested that if issues like immigration policy were discussed more openly in public discourse, then the alt-right would no longer be able to monopolize them.

Some opponents sought to undermine the alt-right's stereotype of leftists as being devoid of humor and joy by using its own tactics of humor and irony against it. For instance, when alt-rightists became angry or upset, some of their opponents described them as "snowflakes" who were being "triggered". Anti-fascist activists also adopted the alt-right's use of pranks; on several occasions they publicized events in which they were purportedly meeting to destroy Confederate monuments or gravestones. Alt-rightists mobilized to publicly defend these sites, only to find that no such anti-fascist event was happening at all. Within feminist circles, the alt-right's desired future was repeatedly compared to the Republic of Gilead, the fictional dystopia in Margaret Atwood's The Handmaid's Tale (1985) and its 2017 television adaptation.

Various opponents have also employed doxing, publicly revealing the identities and addresses of alt-rightists, many of whom had previously acted anonymously. This tactic discourages individuals from involving themselves in alt-right activities to begin with, as they fear that should they be outed as alt-rightists they might face repercussions such as job loss, social ostracization, or violence. From 2016 onward, some anti-fascist opponents of the alt-right also resorted to physical confrontation and violence against the movement. On Trump's inauguration day for example, a masked anti-fascist punched Spencer in the face when he was talking to reporters; the footage was widely shared online. Hawley noted that this tactic could be counter-productive to the anti-alt-right case, as it reinforces the narrative that alt-rightists peacefully engaging in their constitutionally-protected right to free speech were being victimized.

Other commentators have called for more vigorous policing of the web by governments and companies to deal with the alt-right. If denied access to mainstream social media outlets, the alt-right would be restricted to far-right online venues like Stormfront, where it would be isolated from and ignored by those not already committed to its cause. Many in the alt-right concur that denying it access to social media would have a devastating effect on its ability to proselytize. It has however been suggested that such censorship could backfire, as it would play into the alt-right narrative that those campaigning for white interests were being marginalized by the establishment, thus aiding the movement's recruitment. Suppressing the alt-right in this manner would also set a precedent which could be repeated for other groups in future, including leftist ones. Phillips and Yi argued that such leftist attempts to prevent alt-right speech reflected an "authoritarian shift" which was becoming "increasingly hegemonic" within the American Left and that endorsed the view that "limiting or preventing the public speech of historically privileged groups (typically, whites, males) is acceptable until power relations are equalized."

In June 2017, the Southern Baptist Convention voted to "'decry every form of racism, including alt-right white supremacy as antithetical to the Gospel of Jesus Christ'".

== Conservatives ==
U.S. conservatives were generally quick to condemn the alt-right as a racist movement. However, condemning it in this way placed conservatives in an awkward rhetorical position; for several years, conservatives had widely presented themselves as the challengers of liberal political correctness, but in condemning others for racism they opened themselves to the accusation that they too were upholders of political correctness.

Writing for National Review, French called alt-rightists "wanna-be fascists" and bemoaned their entry into the national political conversation; in the same publication, Ian Tuttle rejected the alt-right claim that "American conservatism was willfully complicit in the rise of the identity-politics Left" as "simply nonsense".

Writing for The Weekly Standard, Benjamin Welton instead described the alt-right as a "highly heterogeneous force" that "turns the left's moralism on its head and makes it a badge of honor to be called 'racist,' 'homophobic,' and 'sexist'".

Conservative political commentator Ben Shapiro called the alt-right "a garbage movement composed of garbage ideas" that "has nothing to do with constitutional conservatism." Shapiro has argued that the American Left has attempted "to lump in the Right with the alt-right by accepting a broader, false definition of the alt-right that could include traditional conservatism".

== Liberals ==
Writing for The New Yorker, Benjamin Wallace-Wells described it as a "loosely assembled far-right movement", but he said that its differences from the conventional right-wing in American politics are more a matter of style than of substance: "One way to understand the alt-right is not as a movement but as a collective experiment in identity, in the same way that many people use anonymity on the Internet to test more extreme versions of themselves".

Chris Hayes on All In with Chris Hayes described alt-right as a euphemistic term for "essentially modern-day white supremacy". BuzzFeed reporter Rosie Gray described the alt-right as "white supremacy perfectly tailored for our times", saying that it uses "aggressive rhetoric and outright racial and anti-Semitic slurs" and that it has "more in common with European far-right movements than American ones".

Writing for Haaretz, Yishai Schwartz described the alt-right as "vitriolically anti-Semitic", saying that "[t]he 'alternative' that the alt-right presents is, in large part, an alternative to acceptance of Jews" and warned that it must be taken seriously as a threat. Also writing for Haaretz, Chemi Shalev has observed that alt-right supporters of Trump "despise Jewish liberals with same venom that Israeli right detests Jewish leftists".

== Libertarians ==
Writing for Reason.com, Zach Weissmueller said that "Anyone who claims to care about individual liberty should reject the overt racism in Charlottesville, the broadly defined alt-right and the watered down 'alt-lite'" and described the alt-right as being "about recapturing a nonexistent past through vague but misleading appeals to Western values."

== See also ==
- The Alt-Right Playbook
