= Kyle Chapman (American activist) =

American white nationalist and alt-wing activist

- Born: 1975 or 1976 (age 50–51)
- Other names: Based Stickman; Alt-Knight
- Organizations: Fraternal Order of the Alt-Knights; Resist Marxism; Proud Boys
- Movement: Alt-right

Kyle Chapman (born 1975 or 1976), also known by the nickname Based Stickman, is an American white nationalist and alt-right activist. He earned his nickname and prominence in the alt-right movement after he was recorded beating an anti-fascist counter-protester with a stick at the March 2017 March 4 Trump rally in Berkeley, California. Shortly after, he founded the Fraternal Order of the Alt-Knights (FOAK), a paramilitary group that is considered a partner or subgroup of the far-right, neo-fascist Proud Boys organization. He led the FOAK until later that year, when he faded from his leadership position following an assault conviction related to the March 4 Trump rally. In November 2020, Chapman announced an attempted takeover of the Proud Boys organization, as well as a plan to reform the group as an explicitly white supremacist organization. The attempted coup was not successful.

== Personal life ==
Chapman was born in 1975 or 1976 and is from Daly City, California. He has worked as a commercial diver. He has described himself as a "Proud American Nationalist" and an "ardent" supporter of Donald Trump.

== Activism ==
Chapman became active in counter-protests after he saw a video of a Trump supporter who was pepper-sprayed when attending a Milo Yiannopoulos speaking engagement at the University of California, Berkeley.

=== March 4 Trump rally ===
Chapman came to prominence among the alt-right following the March 4, 2017 March 4 Trump rally in Berkeley, California, where he was recorded wearing homemade armor, hitting an anti-fascist counter-protester over the head with a stick. Video and stills of the incident went viral, earning Chapman the nicknames "Based Stickman" and the "Alt-Knight". He was arrested at the rally on multiple assault charges. A campaign on the alt-tech crowdfunding platform WeSearchr raised more than $86,000 to pay his bail and legal fees. Following the incident, Proud Boys founder Gavin McInnes invited Chapman to become involved with his organization. Later in 2017, McInnes said he had considered making Chapman the president of the entire Proud Boys organization, but that "it makes more sense that he runs the Alt-Knights".

=== Fraternal Order of the Alt-Knights ===
In 2017, Chapman founded a paramilitary group called the Fraternal Order of the Alt-Knights. Considered a close partner or subgroup of the Proud Boys, and sometimes described as the Proud Boys' "tactical defense arm", the FOAK has been described by The New York Times as a right-wing vigilante group. The group was initially organized to provide protection to attendees of conservative speakers including Ann Coulter and Milo Yiannopoulos. The group also began recruiting online to organize violent clashes against leftist opponents. Following Chapman's criminal convictions, he faded from the spotlight as a leader among the Proud Boys, but for a while remained an active supporter in online postings.

=== Resist Marxism and Super Happy Fun America ===
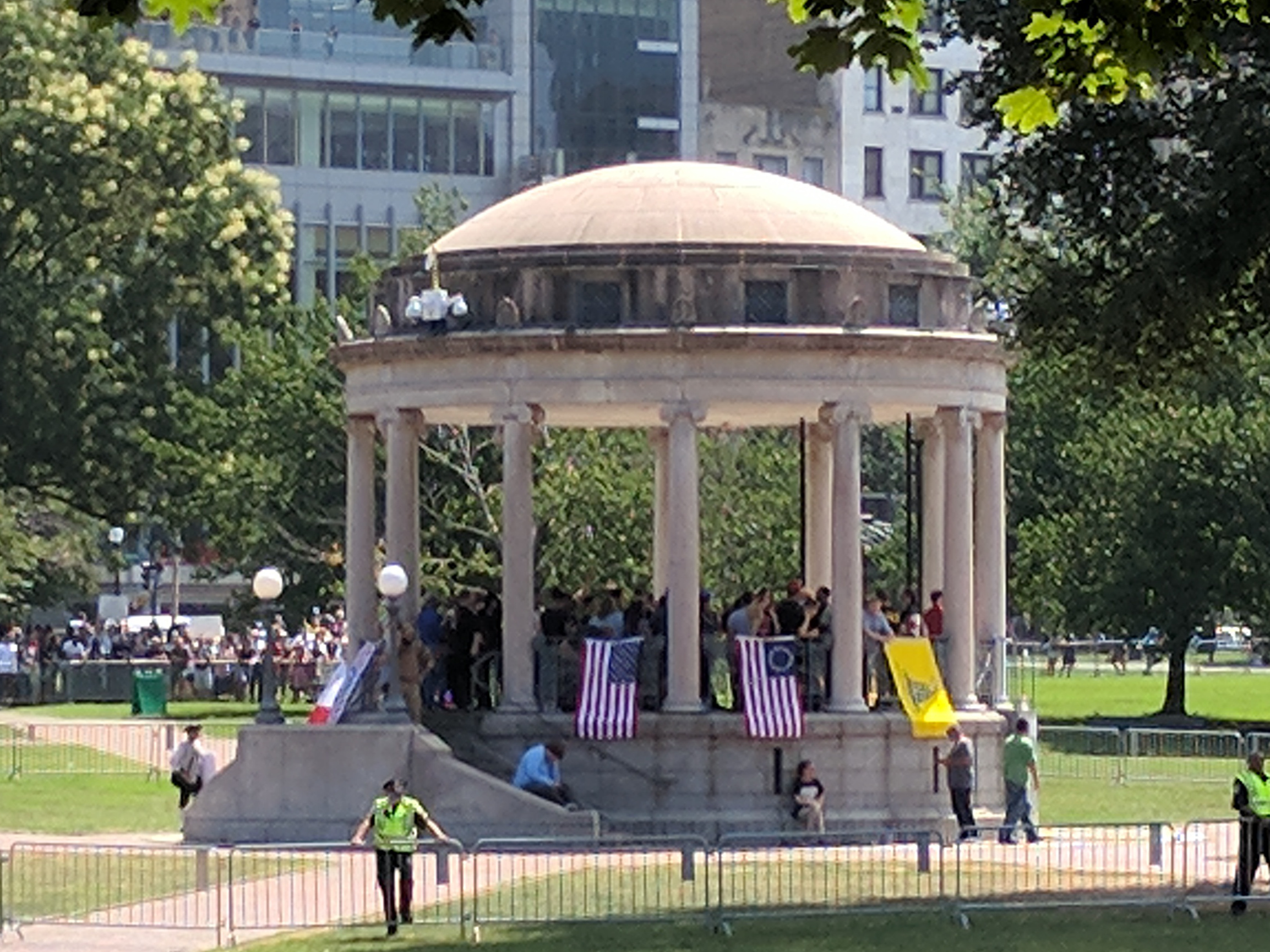
Participants in the 2017 Boston Free Speech Rally gather at the Parkman Bandstand in the Boston Common.

In 2017, Chapman also founded an organization called Resist Marxism in Boston, Massachusetts. The group, whose stated mission was to "defend the Constitution against violent extremists and the left" and which claimed to be non-violent and not racist, was generally described as an alt-lite group. A 2018 exposé by ThinkProgress found internal chats showing the group was "steeped in [the] same sort of racist, anti-Semitic rhetoric as groups on the far-right fringes".

Chapman was scheduled to speak at the Boston Free Speech Coalition's Boston Free Speech Rally on August 19, 2017, but the event was ended early due to a 40,000-person counter-protest. Resist Marxism organized an event they called "Rally for the Republic" on November 18, 2017. Chapman spoke at the event, which was held despite being denied a permit by Boston officials.

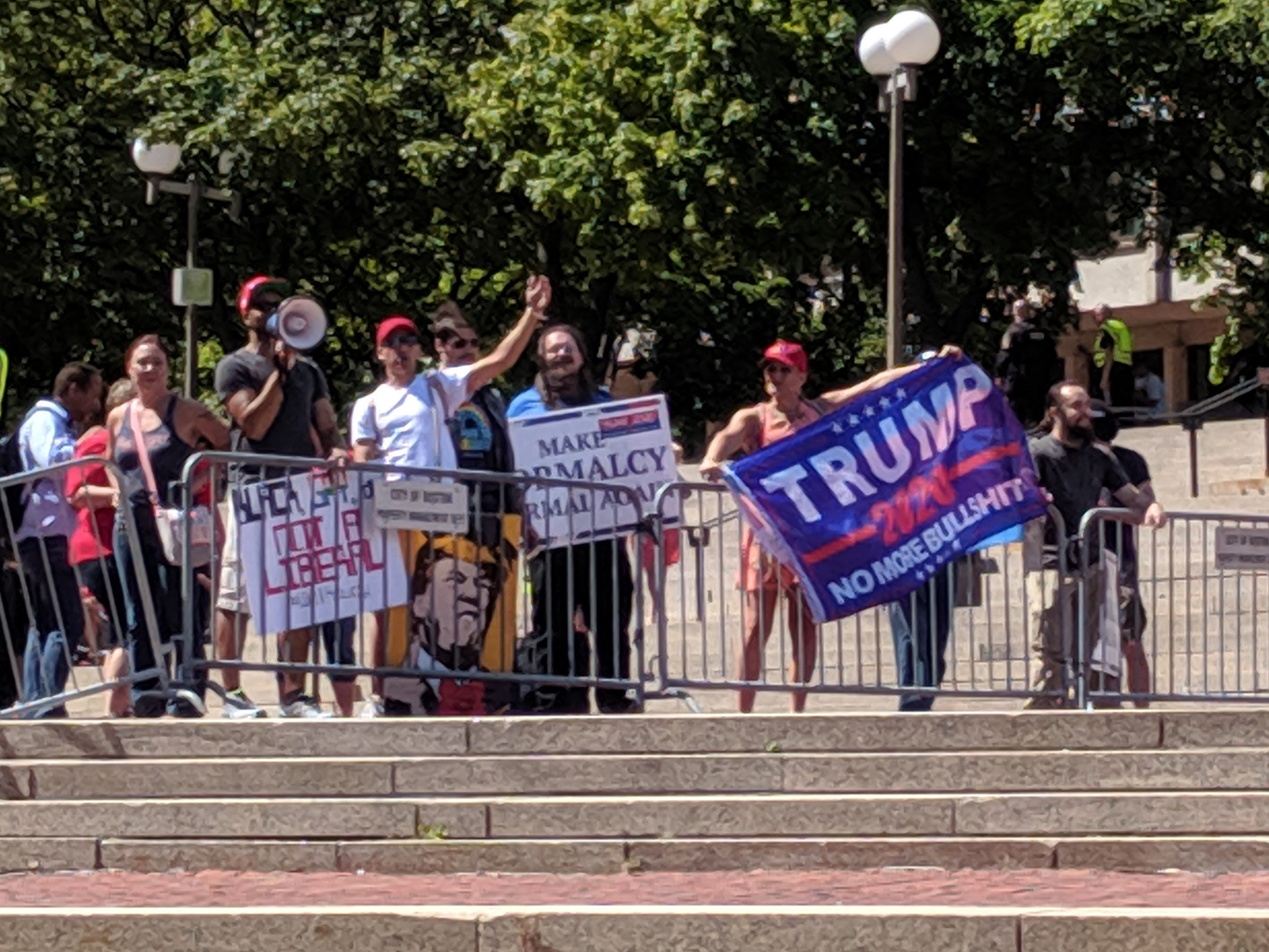
Attendees of the 2019 Boston Straight Pride Parade

In 2019, an organization called Super Happy Fun America was established in Boston, Massachusetts. The group was later described as a front for Resist Marxism. The group organized the Boston Straight Pride Parade on August 31, 2019, which attracted several hundred participants and thousands of protesters.

=== Attempted takeover of the Proud Boys ===
According to Proud Boys chairman Enrique Tarrio, Chapman left the Proud Boys in 2017 to "start his own thing". He reapplied to join the Proud Boys in October 2020, but was denied membership. Despite not having been involved with the Proud Boys for several years, Chapman announced an attempted takeover of the organization on November 9, 2020.

While gathering near the White House to watch Donald Trump's post-election night speech in the early hours of November 4, 2020, multiple Proud Boys including Tarrio were stabbed during an altercation. In a video of the incident, Tarrio is shown retreating from the fight after being slashed in the abdomen. On November 8, Chapman criticized Tarrio's display of "inaction and fear" in the video.

On November 9, following Trump's defeat, Chapman said he would "reassume [his] post as President of the Proud Boys", though it is not evident that he has ever been president of the organization. Chapman cited Tarrio's "failure... to conduct himself with honor and courage on the battlefield" as one of the reasons for the coup. Chapman announced that the group, which had previously denied being a racist or white supremacist organization, would take on an explicitly white supremacist direction, and that he intended to refocus the organization on the issues of "white genocide" and the "failures of multiculturalism". Chapman also directed racial slurs at Tarrio, who is black and Latino, and suggested he had been appointed the chairman of the group because of tokenism. Chapman made what The Daily Dot has described as a "thinly-veiled vow to violently overthrow the government and replace it with a white supremacist fascist regime", referencing the neo-fascist Third Position ideologies. He also announced that he would change the logo and rename the group to the "Proud Goys", a term used among the far-right to signal antisemitism.

The attempted coup was not successful. Tarrio remained the chairman of the Proud Boys, and the Proud Goys name has not been adopted outside of Chapman's social media. Tarrio has said he does not think Chapman's attempted takeover would succeed, and that he thought Chapman was drunk and joking when he made the posts. Chapman made a comment saying he had been joking, though he later deleted it and said that he was serious about taking over the group.

The attempted takeover and its subsequent denial by Tarrio has been described by The Daily Dot as "infighting" and a "disintegration" of the group following Trump's defeat; The Daily Beast has called the events a "meltdown".

== Arrests and convictions ==
Chapman had several felony convictions prior to his emergence as a figure in the alt-right, including a 2001 grand theft charge in San Diego County and a 1993 robbery conviction in Texas.

Chapman was arrested at the March 4 Trump rally on suspicion of felony assault with a deadly weapon, carrying a concealed dirk or dagger, assault with a taser, and assault with pepper spray. In August 2017, Chapman pleaded no contest to the charge of felony possession of a leaded cane or billy club, and was sentenced to five years of probation. He was also ordered to stay 100 yards away from the Civic Center Plaza and to pay $300 in restitution.

Chapman was arrested again in April 2017 for allegedly fighting a person in Berkeley while filming a promotional video for a rally.

In December 2017, Chapman was pulled over for operating a vehicle off-road and disorderly conduct. He pled guilty to the two misdemeanors and was sentenced to a year of probation and a $500 fine or community service.

In July 2018, Chapman was charged with being a fugitive and was extradited to Texas for charges related to a bar fight that occurred in July 2017 in Austin, Texas, where he hit a man in the face with a wooden bar stool. A witness to the attack recognized Chapman on television when he was advertising a "Texans for American Freedom March" outside the Texas capitol. Chapman pled guilty to aggravated assault, and was sentenced to three years of deferred adjudication, a $10,000 fine, and anger management classes.

On January 12, 2022, Chapman was arrested for assaulting a health care worker in Boise, which is a felony in Idaho. The incident occurred while he was being treated for pneumonia at Saint Alphonsus Regional Medical Center in Boise. While she was changing Chapman's mask, he called her a derogatory name and forcefully grabbed her arm in front of another healthcare worker and two security officers. (Chapman's lawyer would later dispute the number of times the arm was grabbed). In court filings, his lawyer stated that Chapman was in "great medical distress" that had caused him to have a priest administer the last rites. Chapman stated he was having increased difficulty breathing and told police he felt he "was being harassed by medical staff members and was not receiving adequate care." In December 2022, Chapman pleaded guilty to the battery charges and was sentenced to 90 days in jail and ordered to pay $5,615 in restitution.
