= Boston Free Speech Rally =

Rally in Boston in 2017

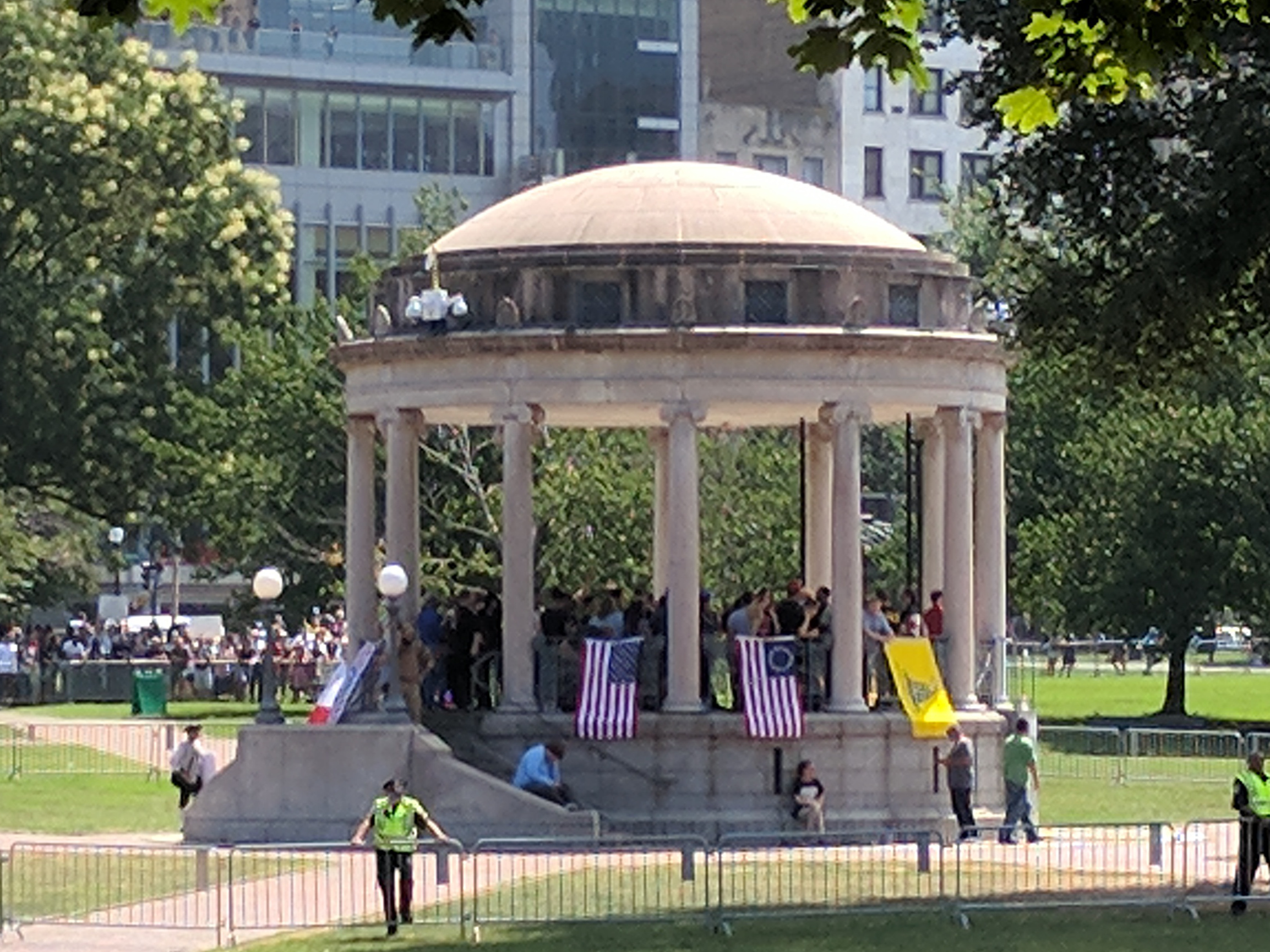
- Boston Free Speech rally attendees in the Parkman Bandstand on the Boston Common
- Date: August 19, 2017
- Venue: Boston Common
- Location: Boston, Massachusetts, U.S.A.; 42°21′18″N 71°03′56″W
- Arrests: 33

The Boston Free Speech Rally took place at the Boston Common on August 19, 2017. The organizers and participants were characterized as adherents of the alt-lite, a loosely organized right-wing political movement. Around 50 people attended the rally, and they were met by tens of thousands of counterprotesters.

== Background ==
The rally was organized by John Medlar and others in the Boston Free Speech Coalition. It was intended to feature Kyle Chapman, Joe Biggs, Shiva Ayyadurai, and Samson Racioppi as speakers, as well as Gavin McInnes, conservative activist Cassandra Fairbanks and Holocaust denier Augustus Sol Invictus.

Though the rally itself had been planned weeks in advance, it was ultimately eclipsed by the violent Unite the Right rally in Charlottesville, Virginia on August 12. More than 30 people were injured at the Charlottesville rally following violent clashes between protesters and counterprotesters, and a woman was killed and 35 others were injured after a white supremacist rammed his car into a group of counterprotesters. The events in Charlottesville drew concern among Boston officials that the Free Speech Rally might see similar violence; as such, Invictus, who had attended the Charlottesville Unite the Right rally, was asked by rally organizers not to appear "from a PR standpoint", and McInnes and Fairbanks withdrew as speakers.

== Event ==
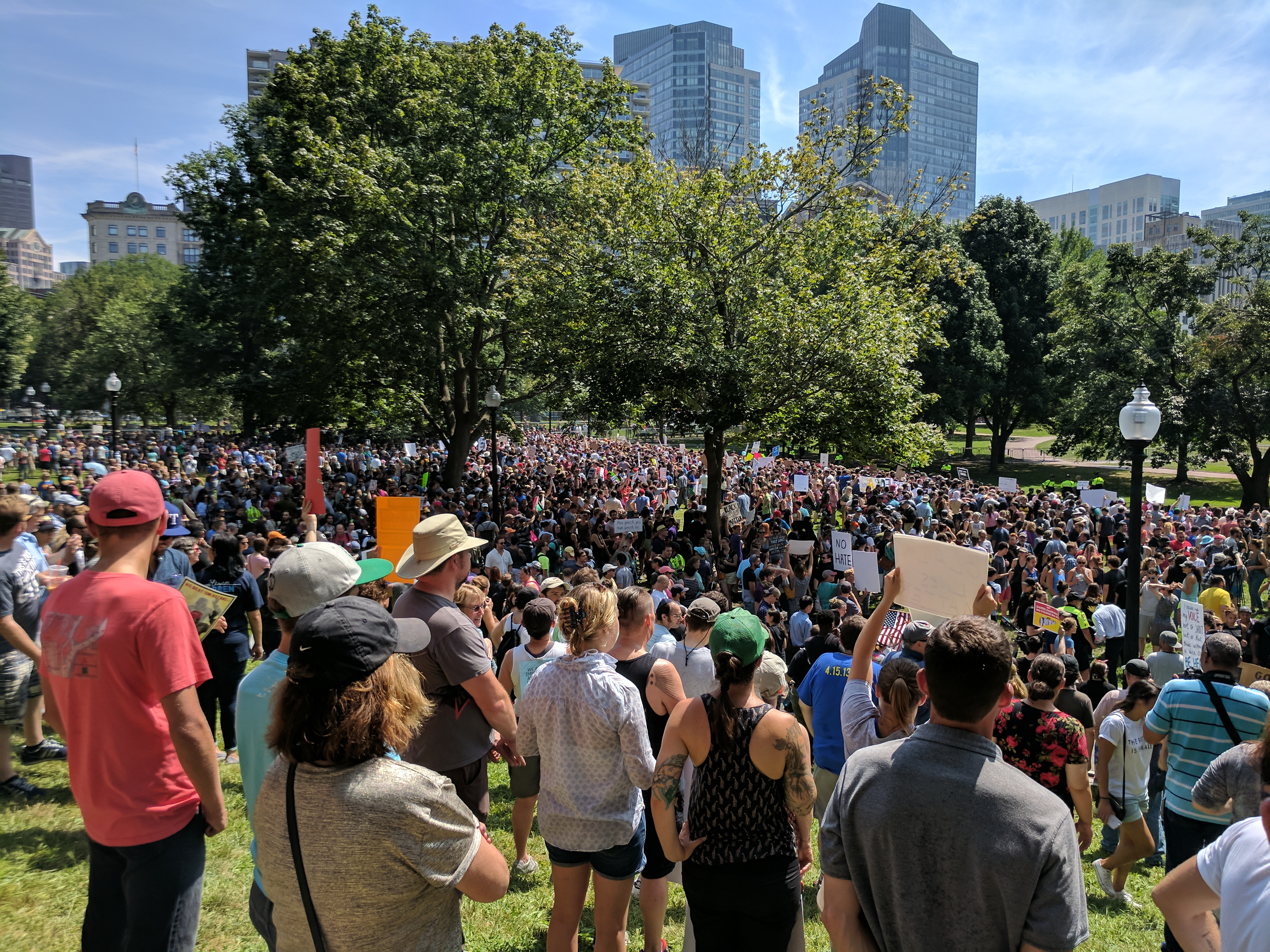
Counterprotesters gather in the Boston Common to oppose the rally

The city deployed more than 500 police officers to the event, which was held at the Parkman Bandstand. Police erected barricades and blocked streets near the rally, and weapons of any kind were banned.

The rally ended early, and all rally attendees left by 1:00 pm. Most of the planned speeches did not take place. Police maintained a gap of 35–40 yards between the rally and counterprotesters; due to this and lack of any amplification, only those within the bandstand could hear the speeches. Samson Racioppi, who was scheduled to speak, said "I really think it was supposed to be a good event by the organizers, but it kind of fell apart". No members of the press were allowed to report from the bandstand.

Meanwhile, whereas the rally drew only a handful of attendees, between 30,000 and 40,000 people participated in the counterprotest march from Roxbury to the Boston Common. The event was largely peaceful, with no injuries reported as of the afternoon of August 19. 33 people were arrested, largely for disorderly conduct. There were a few arrests for assaults on police officers. During a news conference in the afternoon of August 19, Boston Police Commissioner William B. Evans said that some rocks and bottles filled with urine had been thrown at police officers but that overall there was "very little injury and property damage".

== Legacy ==
According to The Boston Globe in February 2021, "Even though few came to support the Free Speech Rally, it fueled the alt-right movement in Boston". The organizers of the rally ultimately joined Resist Marxism, a far-right organization founded by Kyle Chapman. Following bad publicity stemming from the revelation of internal conversations showing the group using racist and antisemitic slurs and rhetoric, and fantasizing about attacking leftist activists, Resist Marxism disbanded. Many of its members ultimately joined Super Happy Fun America, which has been described as a "front" for Resist Marxism.

== See also ==
- Radical right (United States)
