= Straight flag =

Any flag intended to represent heterosexuality

A straight flag or heterosexual flag is a pride flag intended to represent heterosexuality. Some straight flags represent straight pride, a conservative countermovement to gay pride. There is also the straight ally flag, which is intended to represent allyship by straight people with the LGBTQ community. Although there are many proposed straight flags, none of them have broad consensus.

== Straight pride ==
Straight pride flags

A straight pride flag

Black-grey-white variation of the latter flag

Flag used by supporters of the "super straight" trend

A flag composed of alternating black and white strips, with a design similar to the rainbow LGBTQ pride flag, was created to represent straight pride. Several variations of this flag exist. One uses white, grey and black colors, mimicking the rainbow flag and originating in the early 2000s. Another variation with the male and female gender symbols imposed over its field also exists.

=== Russia ===
In 2015, the ruling Russian political party United Russia introduced a straight pride flag to be displayed on the Peter and Fevronia Day (also known as the Day of Family, Love and Faithfulness). It consists of a woman, a man and their three children with a hashtag saying #НастоящаяCемья ("#RealFamily") below. It was created as a response to the legalization of same-sex marriage in the United States earlier the same year. It has three variants, each representing one of the three colors of the flag of Russia. One portrays the family and text in red on a white background while the other two display the symbols in white on a red or blue field.

The French organization against same-sex marriage La Manif pour tous accused the party of plagiarism, as the flag it used was highly similar to the one used by United Russia, with the only differences being that the French organization's flag has two children and not three. However, Alexey Lisovenko, the then deputy head of United Russia in Moscow, stated that the design of the flag had been done with the approval of creators of La Manif pour tous' flag.

=== United States ===
In 2019, the American organization Super Happy Fun America led a straight pride parade in Boston, in the United States, in August of the same year. Described as "a response to the 'identity politics' of the left", the event attracted several hundred participants and thousands of counter-protesters, who vastly outnumbered participants of the parade. The organization featured a straight pride flag on its official website. This flag was rectangular and divided from its upper hoist to its lower fly, with pink at the fly and blue at the hoist, and superimposed with interlocked male and female gender symbols in yellow bordered with black.

=== Online ===
In 2021, a social media trend called "super straight" emerged on TikTok on 21 February and later spread to other websites like 4chan, Reddit and Twitter. Supporters stated that "super straight" was a new sexuality describing heterosexuals who would never have a sexual relationship with transgender people. Its originator said he created the term because he was tired of being called transphobic. The trend was described by Insider as transphobic, and listed by GLAAD as online hate speech. Supporters of the trend created an orange and black flag, which has been said to be meant to imitate PornHub's logo. Variants of the flag included the hashtag "#SuperStraight" or intertwined male and female symbols. Some 4chan users used the acronym SS for "super straight", which led some people, including some supporters of the trend on the website, to associate it with the logo of Adolf Hitler's Schutzstaffel, which also used SS as its acronym. As a result, some flags with Nazi symbolism were also used by these supporters.

== Allyship ==
Straight ally flag

A variation of the alternating black-and-white striped flag is known as the straight ally flag, and represents heterosexual people who support the LGBTQ community. It combines the black and white straight flag with the rainbow LGBTQ flag. The rainbow portion of the flag sometimes takes the form of an "A", representing the word "allies", or an inverted "V". It originated in the late 2000s, but its exact origin is unknown.

== See also ==
- LGBTQ symbols
