= March 4 Trump =

2017 series of demonstrations in support of U.S President Donald Trump

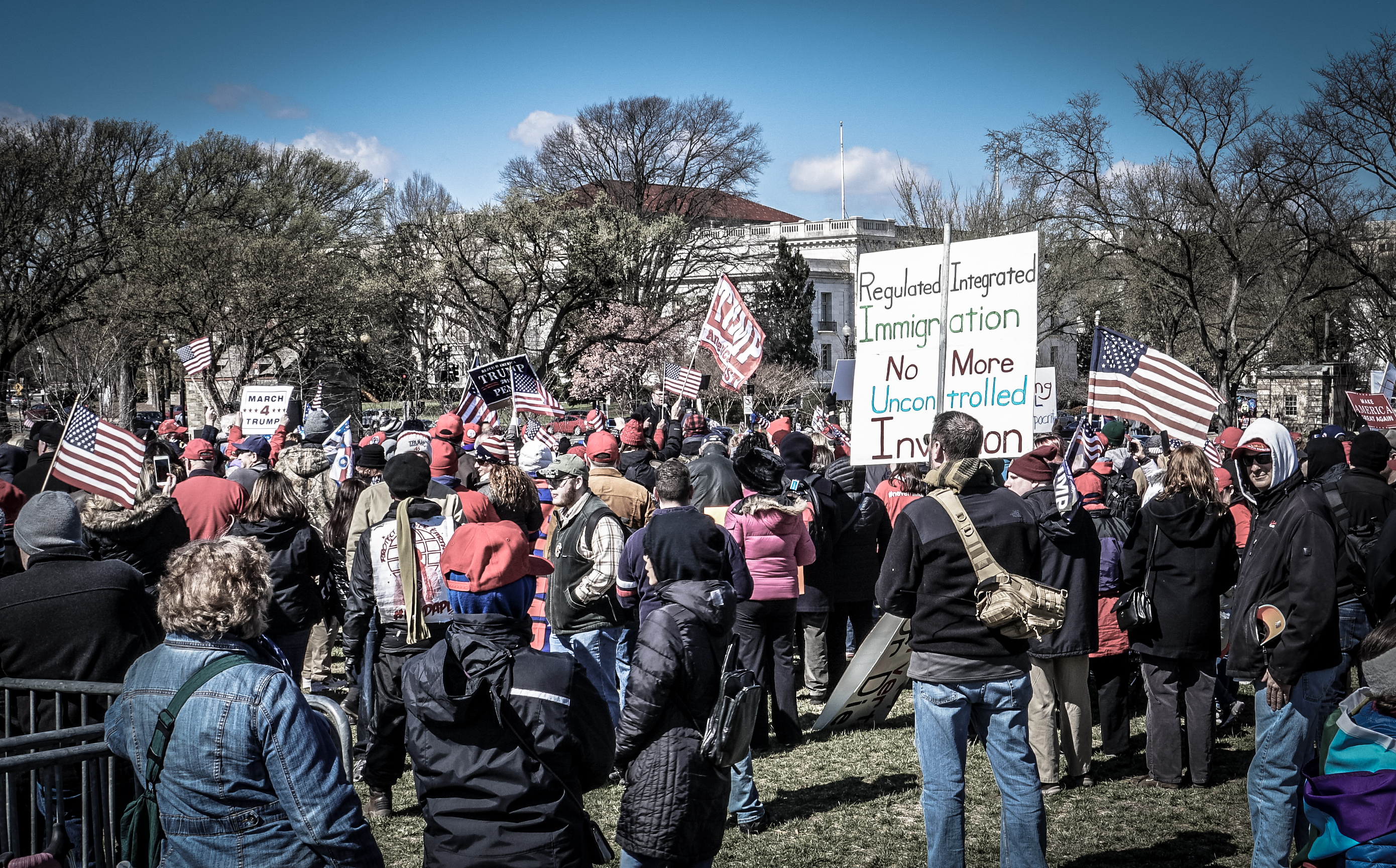
- Demonstration in Washington, D.C.
- Date: March 4, 2017; 9 years ago
- Location: United States
- Type: Demonstrations
- Cause: Support of president Donald Trump
- Organized by: Vincent Haney, Corinne Braun, Peter Boykin
- Injuries: 7 (Berkeley, California)
- Arrests: 10 (Berkeley, California)

March 4 Trump was a series of more than two dozen demonstrations organized throughout the United States on March 4, 2017, in support of President Donald Trump. The official message of the demonstration was "Stop the fight. Let's all unite." The founder of the March 4 Trump movement is Vincent Haney, who says he was inspired to create a peaceful pro-Trump movement after listening to commentary by famous individuals speaking out against Trump and watching the anti-Trump marches. Some of the March organizers were part of the Tea Party movement.

== Locations ==
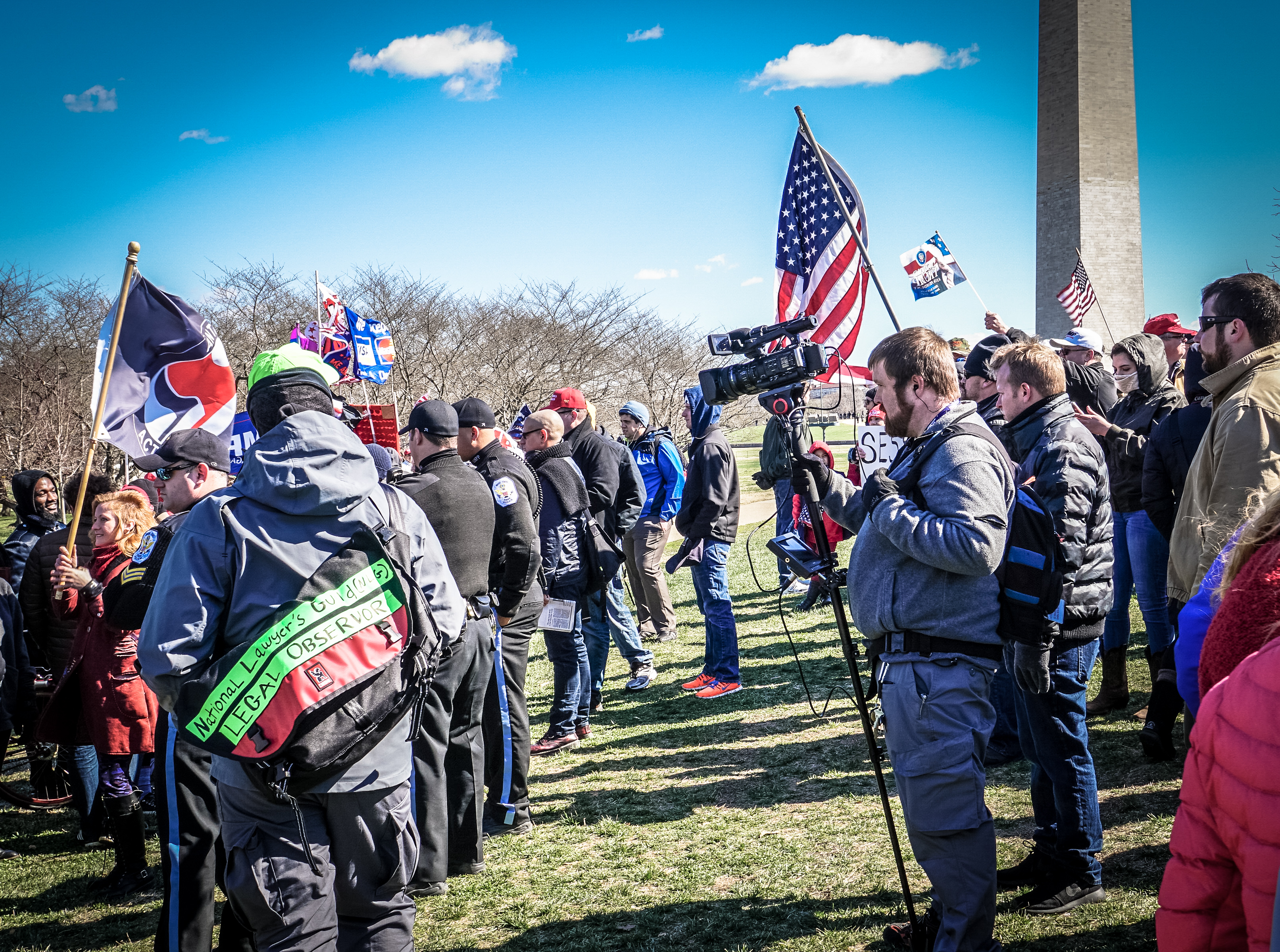
Washington, D.C. rally

As of February 23, 2017, the Facebook page for the Washington, D.C., event, which was held at the National Mall, showed 166 people planning to attend, with an additional 349 expressing interest and another 1,800 who had been invited. On the day, an estimated 150 Trump supporters marched from the Washington Monument to Lafayette Square near the White House.

Events were also held outside the Colorado State Capitol in Denver and the Trump Tower in Midtown Manhattan, New York City, as well as in Columbus, Ohio, Florida (including Miami, Orlando, and Palm Beach), Indiana, Maine, Middletown, New Jersey, Missouri, Nashville, Tennessee, and Pennsylvania. Approximately 200 Trump supporters gathered in New York City.

The March 4 Trump event at Berkeley became violent as pro-Trump and anti-Trump groups clashed. The rally took place at Martin Luther King Jr. Civic Center Park at 2 pm, but fighting broke out before the rally started. Anarchists dressed in black dominated the crowd by 3 pm. Both sides alleged that violence was started by the other faction. Smoke bombs were set off, with 7 people injured and 10 arrested. The rally in support of Trump did not have the proper permits for a demonstration. One man, Kyle Chapman, was arrested for allegedly hitting a protester in the head with a stick. Images of Chapman in his makeshift armor went viral as "Based StickMan" or "Alt-Knight." A campaign started by the Proud Boys to raise money for his bail and other expenses took in more than $85,000.

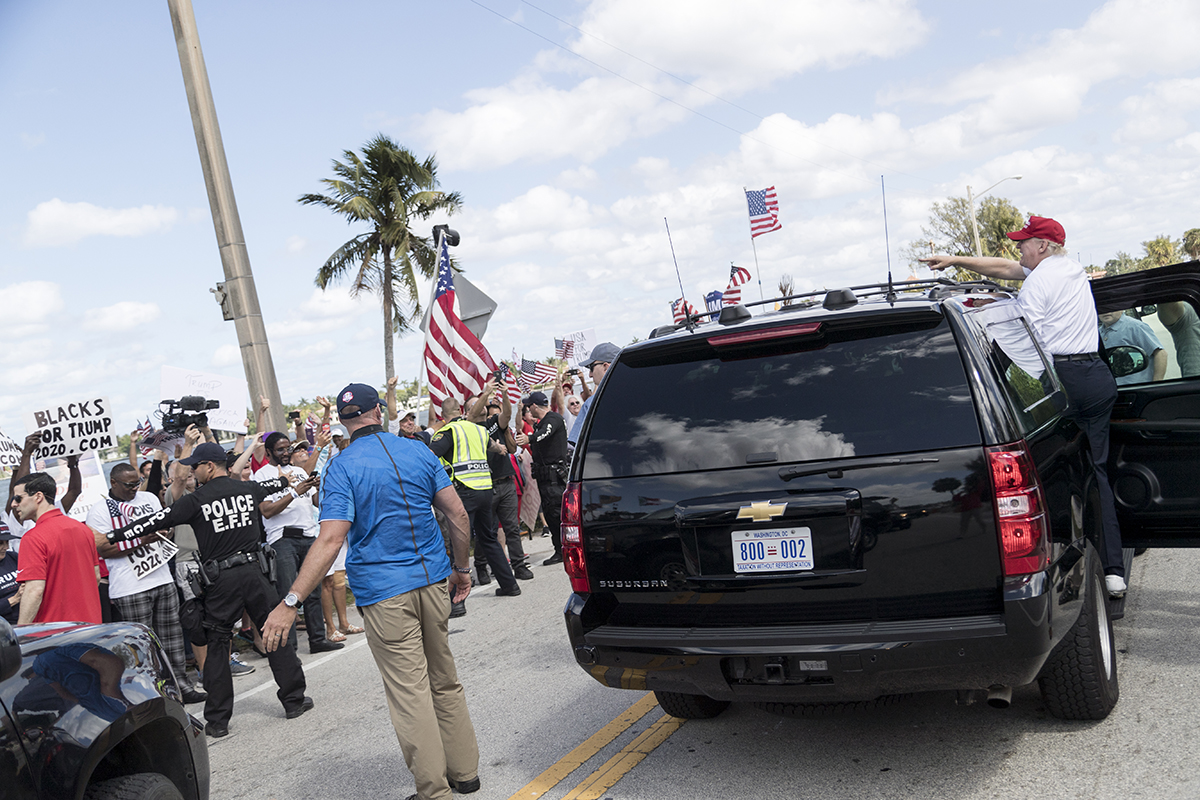
Trump waves to supporters at a rally in West Palm Beach, Florida

The march in Lake Oswego, Oregon, which took place at George Rogers Park, was also meant to protest against Governor Kate Brown's decision to continue offering sanctuary throughout Oregon, according to the event's primary organizer. By February 23, 51 people were confirmed to attend the Lake Oswego march. A counter-protest was reportedly being organized by Oregon Students Empowered. On the day, approximately 200 Trump supporters assembled, and were met on the march by up to 700 anti-Trump demonstrators; ensuing disturbances led to three arrests.

Four people were arrested for assaulting police in Olympia, Washington. 300 Trump supporters attended an event in Saint Paul, Minnesota. According to a Minnesota State Patrol officer, 50 counterprotesters started fighting, resulting in six arrests and charges of rioting and disorderly conduct. A march was planned in Springfield, Illinois, by two women who discovered that no marches had been organized yet in the state. The Springfield rally attracted around 200 pro-Trump demonstrators.

== See also ==
- Gays for Trump
