= Threshold Editions =

US publishing imprint

- Parent company: Gallery Publishing Group (Simon & Schuster)
- Founded: 2006
- Country of origin: United States
- Headquarters location: Simon & Schuster Building; New York City
- Publication types: Books
- Nonfiction topics: Conservative non-fiction
- Official website: www.simonandschuster.com

Threshold Editions is an imprint of book publisher Simon & Schuster, a division of Kohlberg Kravis Roberts, specializing in conservative non-fiction. The imprint was co-founded by Mary Matalin, serving as its first editor-in-chief, and Louise Burke, who served as publisher until 2017.

== History ==
Threshold Editions was founded to "provide a forum for the creative people, bedrock principles, and innovative ideas of contemporary conservatism". The imprint was launched after Penguin Books launched Sentinel and Random House launched Crown Forum. Within four years of launching and due to Matalin's network, the imprint had already counted Glenn Beck, Vice President Dick Cheney, and Karl Rove among its authors and was producing bestselling books.

The publisher of Threshold Editions, Louise Burke, stated in an interview that Threshold "best understands the conservative book-buying audience--a key factor needed to keep the hits coming." Matalin and Burke were introduced in 2005 and Burke said, "We were kindred spirits and we took it from there." Of the launch Burke said, "This is an area where it really helps to be a believer. I don't feel you can be successful in this particular genre if you are opposed to the message."

Glenn Beck's book, An Inconvenient Book, reached No.1 on the New York Times Bestseller in 2007.

Karl Rove sold his memoirs, Courage and Consequence: My Life as a Conservative in the Fight, to Threshold in 2007 after an auction with nine bidders, including another one of Simon & Schuster's imprints, Free Press. Rove, who received a seven-figure deal, stated that he chose the imprint as he was a longtime friend of Mary Matalin.

While sales of hardcovers were down for Simon & Schuster in 2009 and early 2010, Threshold Editions had the biggest hits for the company.

By 2014, Threshold was not only publishing memoirs and political commentary, but also young adult and fiction novels such as Rush Limbaugh's Rush Revere and the Brave Pilgrims.

In 2015, Threshold signed a book deal with Donald Trump, for a book originally titled Crippled America: How to Make America Great Again. The title was later changed to Great Again: How to Fix Crippled America. The book debuted at #5 on Publishers Weekly Frontlist Hardcover Nonfiction list.

In late 2016, Threshold signed a deal with Milo Yiannopoulos with a purported advance of US$250,000 for his book Dangerous. The Hollywood Reporter broke the news and social media quickly responded. Within 24 hours of the book being announced it had reached number one on the Amazon best-seller list.

Publication of the book by Simon & Schuster was eventually canceled in February 2017 after a video clip of Yiannopoulos appearing to defend pedophilia resurfaced. He defended himself asserting that he had used regrettably "imprecise language" and was not an advocate for pedophilia. Yiannopoulos attempted to sue the publishers for breach of contract, but later dropped his lawsuit.

== Authors ==
The imprint's authors include:

Broadcasters

- Glenn Beck
- Lou Dobbs
- Mike Gallagher
- Laura Ingraham
- Mark R. Levin
- Rush Limbaugh
- John Stossel

Political leaders

- Jeb Bush
- John Bolton
- Herman Cain
- Dick Cheney
- Bobby Jindal
- Karl Rove
- Donald Trump

Political commentators

- Dinesh D'Souza
- Tom Fitton
- Pete Hegseth
- David Limbaugh
- Michelle Malkin
- Jason Mattera
- Oliver North
- James O'Keefe
- Katie Pavlich
- Ben Shapiro
- Michael Knowles

== See also ==
- Regnery, the publisher that influenced the creation of conservative non-fiction imprints at the Big Five
- Broadside Books, the competing imprint of HarperCollins
- Center Street, the competing imprint of Hachette Book Group
- Crown Forum, the competing imprint of Crown Publishing Group, a subsidiary of Random House
- Sentinel, the competing imprint of Penguin Group
