= Dangerous (book) =

Book by Milo Yiannopoulos

- Cover
- Author: Milo Yiannopoulos
- Language: English
- Subject: Autobiography
- Publisher: Dangerous Books (self-published)
- Publication date: July 4, 2017
- Publication place: United States
- Media type: Print
- Pages: 288
- ISBN: 978-0-692-89344-9

Dangerous is a self-published book by British media personality Milo Yiannopoulos, released on July 4, 2017.

The book was originally due for release on June 13, 2017, by Threshold Editions, a division of Simon & Schuster, but its release was canceled on February 20 due to an audio release in which Yiannopoulos praised aspects of pedophilia as having a positive impact on children. A day after its announcement, pre-sales for the book briefly elevated it to first place on Amazon.com's list of best-sellers. It returned to number one on February 1, 2017, a day after a violent disturbance occurred at UC Berkeley which deterred Yiannopoulos from speaking there.

== History ==
Dangerous was the first book to be published under Yiannopoulos's name; he previously wrote two poetry books under the pseudonym Milo Andreas Wagner. Two previous book projects, which he had announced, never came to fruition. Yiannopoulos received a $250,000 advance payment from Simon & Schuster for the book according to The Hollywood Reporter.

An early draft manuscript of the book was obtained by BuzzFeed News, which asserted the work contained numerous instances of self-plagiarism. Yiannopoulos responded, telling BuzzFeed "I will publish a book of Breitbart columns. Dangerous is a completely original, almost 70,000-word book." According to leaked emails from Yiannopoulos obtained by BuzzFeed, Yiannopoulos paid his Breitbart collaborator Allum Bokhari $100,000 to ghostwrite the book. Yiannopoulos denies this allegation.

Announcement of the book drew outcry from more than 100 Simon & Schuster authors, including Tim Federle, Rainbow Rowell, and Danielle Henderson. Roxane Gay pulled her book from Simon & Schuster, stating that she was not interested in doing business with a publisher willing to give Yiannopoulos a platform. The Chicago Review of Books announced that they would not be reviewing Simon & Schuster's books in 2017 and others called for a boycott.

Simon & Schuster posted a statement on social media on December 30, on its decision to publish Yiannopoulos stating: "We do not and never have condoned discrimination or hate speech in any form. At Simon & Schuster we have always published books by a wide range of authors with greatly varying, and frequently controversial opinions, and appealing to many different audiences of readers. While we are cognizant that many may disagree vehemently with the books we publish we note that the opinions expressed therein belong to our authors, and we do not reflect either a corporate viewpoint or the views of our employees."

On January 12, 2017, 160 Simon & Schuster children's book authors and illustrators published a letter to publisher Carolyn Reidy and the leadership at Simon & Schuster about Threshold's decision. The letter first praised Simon & Schuster for which they described as publishing "the strongest, most diverse list it can acquire, for the betterment of literature and children everywhere." It then went on to criticize the Threshold Editions imprint and its decision to publish Yiannopoulos's book which would associated Simon & Schuster as a whole with Threshold's decision to "legitimize this reprehensible belief system."

== Release ==
In a press release on May 26, 2017, Yiannopoulos announced that the book would be published by his publishing company, Dangerous Books, on July 4, 2017. Soon after the announcement, the book was once again the best-selling book on Amazon. The book's launch was originally intended as an event at the Jue Lan Club. However, on June 23, 2017, the owner of Jue Lan Club cancelled the event after realizing that the event was about Yiannopoulos's book-launch and not a "Gay Pride" event.

== Reception ==
Jocelyn McClurg of USA Today gave Dangerous a score of two out of four stars, saying that the book is simultaneously "very funny" and "boring". McClurg suggested that a more entertaining book by Yiannopoulos could be dedicated to his "hilarious" musings on President Donald Trump, whom Yiannopoulos refers to as "Daddy", and that such a book could be named "My Big 'Daddy' Issues". Writing for the "Digested Read" column of The Guardian, John Crace wrote that Yiannopoulos came off as "desperate" in his writings.

The book was a New York Times, Wall Street Journal and USA Today best seller. The book peaked at No. 1 on Publishers Weekly's nonfiction bestseller list and at No. 2 on The New York Times nonfiction bestseller list, staying on The New York Times list for five weeks. In its debut release on July 4, 2017, the book sold just over 18,000 copies, and not 100,000 as suggested by Yiannopoulos, and temporarily went out of stock on Amazon.com and Barnes & Noble, where it peaked at No. 1 and No. 68 of their bestseller list respectively.

== Controversy ==
=== Pre-release ===
The book elicited controversy, including a statement on Twitter by the Chicago Review of Books that they would not review any Simon & Schuster books because of the book deal.

On February 20, 2017, coinciding with Yiannopoulos receiving criticism for a resurfaced audio recording in which he defended certain forms of pedophilia, Simon & Schuster announced it would not be publishing the book.

=== Release ===
The book was released on July 4, 2017 by Dangerous Books, an independent publishing company started by Yiannopoulos in 2017. Yiannopoulos released a series of videos targeting the bookstore chain Barnes & Noble for declining to stock his book in stores; the book is available for purchase through their website.

Around the time of the book's release, advertisements of the book appeared in public metros. After complaints about the advertisements, Washington Metro subsequently removed them. Meanwhile, in response to complaints, the Chicago Transit Authority responded "CTA cannot prohibit commercial advertising, in this case advertising for the sale of a book by a political person, based simply on that person’s political viewpoint."

=== Case against Simon & Schuster ===
In July 2017, Yiannopoulos filed a $10 million lawsuit against Simon and Schuster, alleging breach of contract.

In January 2018, Yiannopoulos's lawyer, Jeffrey Weingart, submitted Court documents announcing that there had been "a breakdown" in his relationship with Yiannopoulos due to "irreconcilable differences." Several days later, Yiannopoulos released a statement saying that although Weingart's law firm had served as "excellent litigators," he would represent himself against Simon & Schuster. Yiannopoulos explained that because Simon & Schuster had "demanded that virtually all of the documents in this lawsuit remain confidential, and had them classified attorney’s eyes only", it had not been possible for him to "see what has been said about me and my book in my own lawsuit." Yiannopoulos believed that by serving as his own attorney he would be allowed to see that material.

While attending a court hearing in January 2018, Yiannopoulos argued that confidential documents which had not been disclosed to him by Simon & Schuster were "absolutely essential for me to properly assess my own case". The presiding judge, Justice Barry Ostrager, disagreed and ruled that they contained "proprietary financial information" and said the documents had "nothing whatsoever to do with the substantive merits of your case". Justice Ostrager explained the process that Yiannopoulos needed to follow in order to raise a dispute with a view to obtaining access to the documents.

In papers filed on 20 February 2018 with the New York Supreme Court, Yiannopoulos and Simon & Schuster requested that the case be dismissed "without costs or fees to either party". Simon & Schuster later issued a statement stating: "We are pleased that Mr Yiannopoulos' lawsuit has been withdrawn. We stand by our decision to terminate the publication of Mr Yiannopoulos’ book." Yiannopoulos described ending the lawsuit as a "tough decision" but the "right one". Yiannopoulos justified his decision, by arguing that "it was always going to be hard to prove damages, as anyone who has ever hired a 'damages expert' will know. I don’t want to spend all the money I made from my book, and the next two years of my life, on a lawsuit."

=== Simon & Schuster's editorial comments ===
In December 2017, Court documents filed in the US revealed the editorial concerns of the publisher Simon & Schuster about the manuscript of the book. As part of the court submission, Simon & Schuster's editor Mitchell Ivers described Yiannopoulos's first draft as "at best, a superficial work full of incendiary jokes with no coherent or sophisticated analysis of political issues".

As part of their feedback, the publishers recommended that Yiannopoulos needed a "stronger argument against feminism than saying that they are ugly and sexless and have cats" and that another chapter needs "a better central thesis than the notion that gay people should go back in the closet".

At one point, the publishers criticized Yiannopoulos's assertion that "When America landed on the moon, the Cold War essentially ended". In response to the remark, Ivers stated: "The moon landing was 1969. Berlin Wall didn’t fall till 1990. Russia quitting the space race was NOT the end of the Cold War". A section on the false claims of Hillary Clinton's connection to a satanic sex ring was completely removed. "This entire paragraph is just repeating Fake News", Ivers' annotation read.

At multiple points, the publishers called on Yiannopoulos to substantiate assertions made in the book. Yiannopoulos was criticized for suggesting that the Hollywood left was more racist than Nazis, with the editor noting "I don’t like using Nazi analogies. Ever".

Ivers suggested that Yiannopoulos's criticism that contemporary feminism was "merely a capitalist con-job – a money-grab designed to sell T-shirts to Taylor Swift and Beyoncé fans with asinine slogans", was hypocritical, and prompted the note "Um … like your MILO SWAG?"

Consequent on the comments being published online, Yiannopoulos accused Ivers of flirting with him and being biased against his work. Yiannopoulos claimed that Ivers "hates Republicans and thinks they are all virulent homophobes". Ivers, however, had a substantial role in commissioning the work. In court documents he stated: "It was not the serious and substantial commentary on free speech and political correctness that we expected and discussed," but was little more than a "reworking of Mr. Yiannopoulos various speeches." Yiannopoulos later claimed that the comments were leaked to the press in an effort to "ridicule and demean" him.
