= Straight pride =

Countermovement to LGBTQ+ pride movements and events

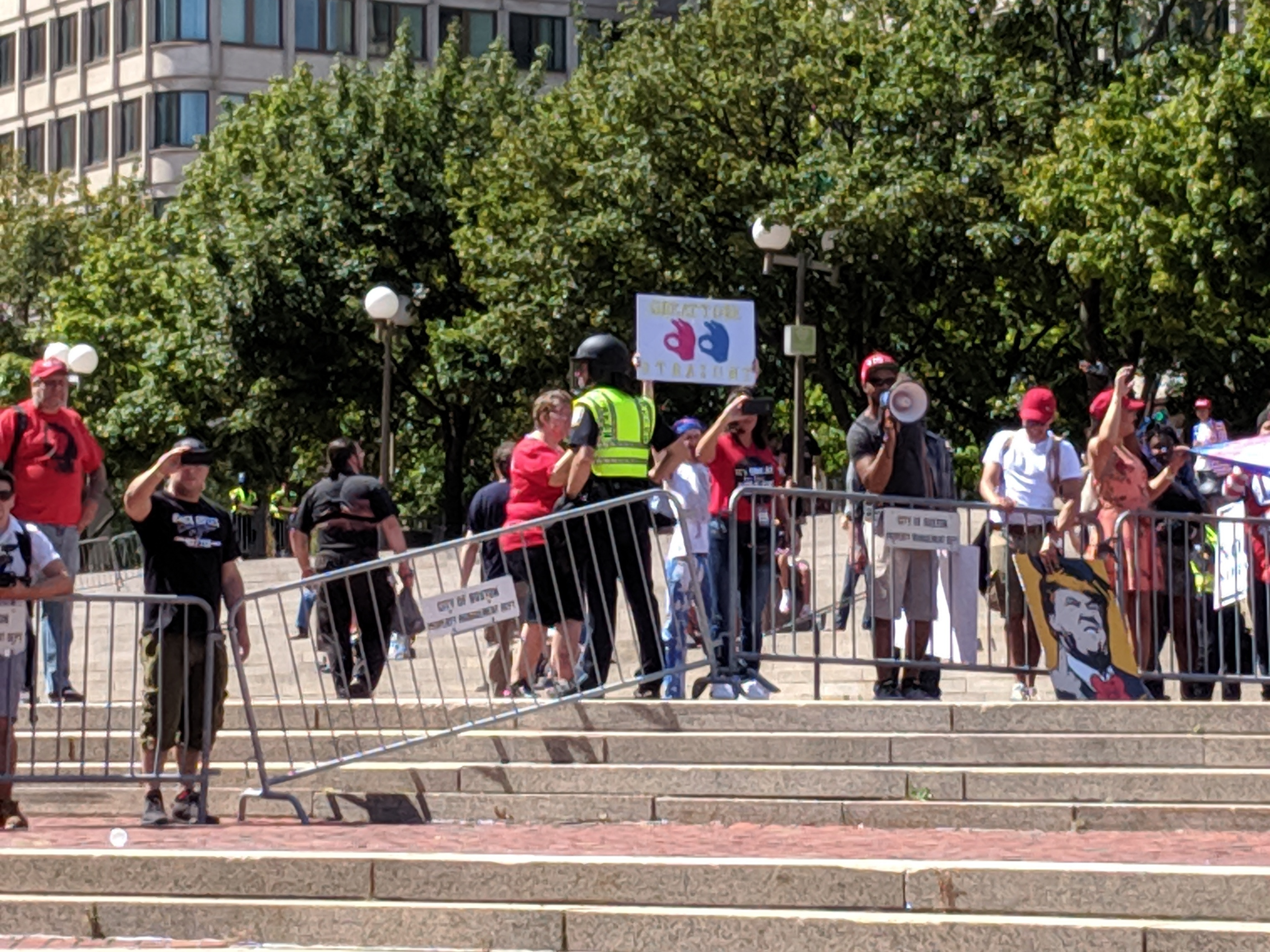
Attendees at the Boston Straight Pride Parade on August 31, 2019. An attendee holds a sign depicting two hands making the 'OK' gesture.

Straight pride is a reactionary slogan and movement that emerged in the late 1980s and early 1990s. It has been used by some socially conservative groups as a political response to gay pride, a slogan adopted by the LGBTQ community in the early 1970s, as well as a rebuttal to gay liberation movements.

Straight pride events have attracted controversy and media attention due to their opposition to LGBTQ pride movements. Protests against policies intended to reduce harassment of LGBTQ adolescents in schools have been another factor in bringing attention to the movement.

== Background ==
=== LGBTQ rights movement ===
Although LGBTQ history extends to ancient civilizations, the contemporary LGBTQ rights movement in North America is widely traced back to the 1969 Stonewall riots in New York City. Initial newspaper coverage of the riots was limited compared to other civil disturbances of the era. A commemorative march held one year later, which drew approximately five thousand participants along Sixth Avenue, received broader media attention, and established the precedent for annual LGBTQ pride marches.

The late 1960s and 1970s saw shifting social attitudes toward homosexuality in parts of North American society. The period also coincided with the rise of disco culture, which is often noted as providing spaces where LGBTQ individuals had greater visibility.

=== Reaction ===
In 1979, a religious revival among conservative Catholics and evangelical Protestants contributed to the rise of the Christian right as a political force in the United States during the 1980s. This political shift coincided with increased opposition to LGBTQ advocacy efforts.

The HIV/AIDS epidemic of the 1980s had a significant impact on LGBTQ communities; the crisis was accompanied by increased stigmatization, social isolation, and violence directed at affected individuals and groups.

== Straight Pride events ==
Icon often used on Straight Pride T-shirts & stickers.

Heterosexual pride parades emerged in response to increasing social acceptance and visibility of LGBTQ people. They began on university campuses in the United States during the 1990s and are widely described as a backlash tactic rather than a grassroots movement.

The term "Straight Pride" has also been used on clothing and stickers, often accompanied by imagery depicting a man and a woman holding hands.

=== Early controversies and campus events ===
In 1988, Vermont Republican John Burger asked state governor Madeleine Kunin to establish a "Straight Pride Day".

In 1990, rallies supporting straight pride were held at the University of Massachusetts Amherst (UMass Amherst) and Mount Holyoke College, organized by Young Americans for Freedom. One such event, held at UMass Amherst in April, was promoted under the name "Burn a Fag in Effigy" rally, according to contemporaneous reports. A similar event held in March of the following year was reportedly attended by about fifty people, while around 500 counter-protesters participated in demonstrations against it.

=== Straight pride parades and public events ===
Events described as "straight pride parades" or "straight pride days" have been organized in response to pride events held by LGBTQ groups. These events have attracted attention primarily due to their controversy, rather than due to large-scale participation. Other events, typically occurring in United States high schools where First Amendment issues have arisen, have involved people wearing "straight pride" T-shirts.

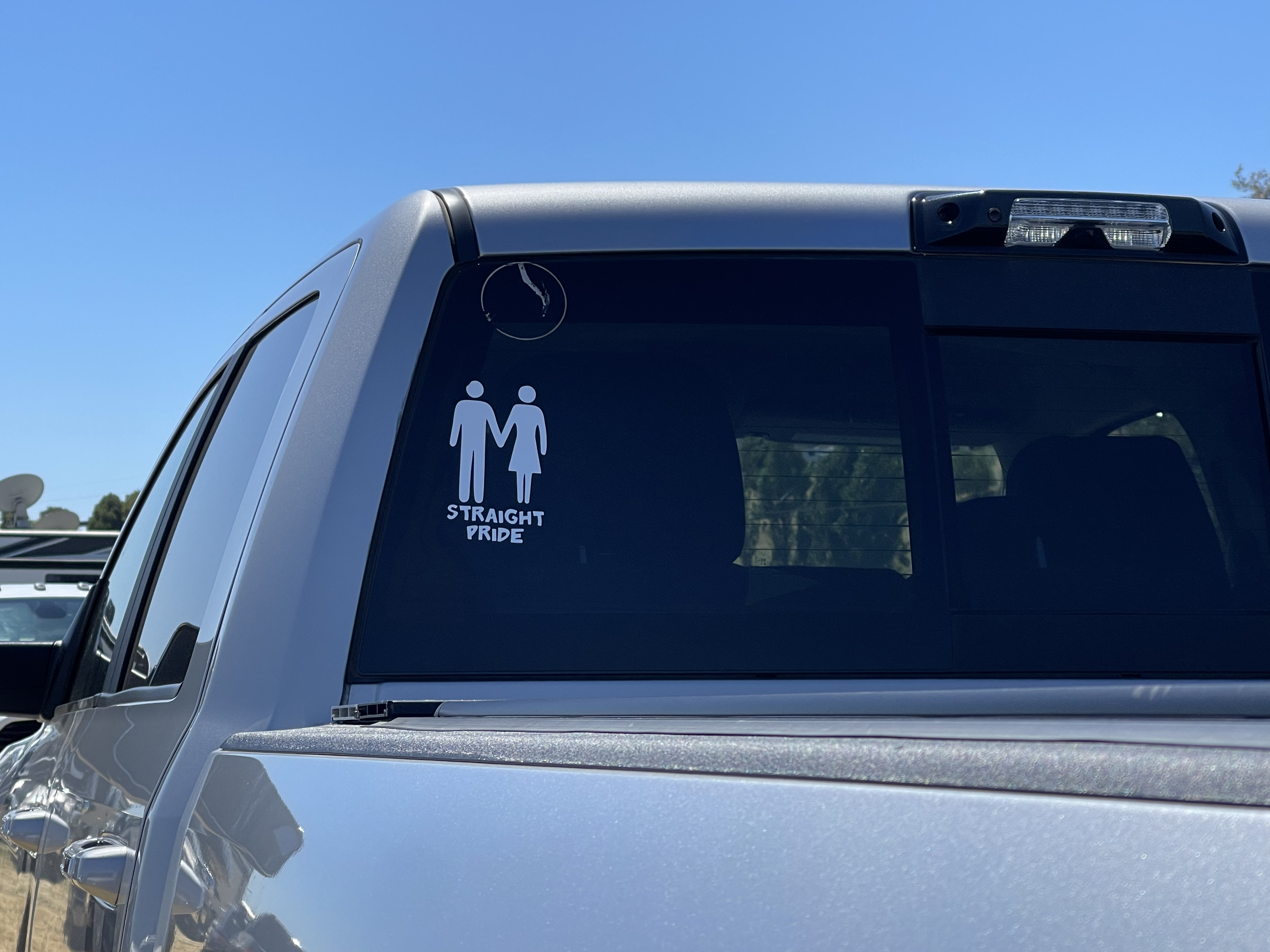
A straight pride sticker on the window of a pickup truck in Sonoma, California, in 2023.

=== Political rallies and public reaction ===
At a 2010 Tea Party Express rally in Lansing, Michigan, a vendor sold T-shirts printed with the slogan "straight pride".

Several state and national LGBTQ advocacy organizations criticized the shirts, arguing that the slogan echoed the use of "white pride" by racist groups. Additional criticism arose from reports that the vendor was financially connected to the event, though these reports were disputed.

=== Ideological motivations and extremist involvement ===
Support for straight pride events has often been linked to religious objections to homosexuality. Some extremist groups, including the White Aryan Resistance and the Ku Klux Klan, have also promoted straight pride rhetoric as part of their opposition to gay pride events.

The proponents of straight pride are often associated with far-right Christian ideologies that follow patriarchal structures, linking heterosexuality to traditional gender roles, including views of women as child bearers, as in the Quiverfull movement.

== Individual events ==
=== Yellowknife, Northwest Territories, Canada (2005) ===
In May 2005, the northern Canadian city of Yellowknife announced that it would officially recognize both a gay and a straight pride day. The mayor declared June 10, 2005, as Gay Pride Day. Councillor Alan Woytuik proposed that there be a Heterosexual Day, and the mayor agreed, setting it for June 9. Woytuik defended the proposal for Heterosexual Day by stating that "recognizing the contributions of heterosexuals is just as legitimate as recognizing the contributions of gay and lesbian communities". The group seeking the Gay Pride Day designation objected, asking if Black History Month would be partnered with White Heritage Month and whether days marking heart disease and strokes should be paired with days celebrating good health. Woytuik's request for Heterosexual Day drew wide media attention, after which he withdrew his request and apologized. He described his action as seeking to treat everyone the same, which was blown out of proportion. The city subsequently rescinded its proclamation of Heterosexual Day.

=== Budapest, Hungary (2010) ===
In 2010, a heterosexual pride march was held in the Hungarian capital of Budapest. Following the route of an earlier gay pride parade, a hundred people participated, including two members of parliament: Dóra Dúró and Előd Novák. Organizers stated that the goal of the march was to prevent future use of public spaces by homosexuals for gatherings.

=== São Paulo, Brazil (2011) ===
In August 2011, the city council of São Paulo, Brazil, designated the third Sunday in December as Heterosexual Pride Day (Portuguese: Dia do Orgulho Hétero). The debate in Brazil over this decision was intense. Evangelical supporter Carlos Apolinário, who previously tried to ban São Paulo's LGBTQ Pride Parade, told reporters that his idea was "not anti-gay, but a protest against the privileges the gay community enjoys". The Brazilian Lesbian, Gay, Bisexual, and Transgender Association criticized this claim and said that it could lead to anti-gay violence.

=== Chipman, New Brunswick, Canada (2018) ===
A straight pride flag similar to this was used in New Brunswick

In October 2018, Glenn Bishop, a resident of Chipman, New Brunswick, raised a straight pride flag in the center of the town with approval from the village council. It was taken down by LGBTQ activists after the better part of a day. Hoisting the straight flag was likened to "putting up a swastika" by local Margaret Clark. The flag drew further protests and calls for an apology from the council members who allowed it to be flown.

=== San Francisco Bay Area, California, United States (2019) ===
Don Grundmann, a Bay Area chiropractor, founded the National Straight Pride Coalition (NSPC) in the spring of 2019 for "protecting traditional gender roles, Christianity, heterosexuality, Western Civilization, babies, and the contributions of whites to Western Civilization from the malevolence of the homosexual movement". Grundmann had previously founded Citizens Against Perversion and American Warrior Ministry. The NSPC's first event was planned to be at Modesto, California's Mancini Bowl, the Graceada Park amphitheater, but the permit was denied for safety and compatibility issues, and because their insurance was voided. After failing again to get the required insurance for a public venue because of the nature of their event, they moved the rally to a private space. This was shut down by the owners when they were alerted that the event was being live-streamed and counter-protesters would likely arrive. The owners, who were unaware of the nature of the event and the group hosting it, later disavowed their involvement. After the rally was kicked out of the private venue, they moved to the parking lot of the area's Planned Parenthood, which was closed. Reports claim that around twenty supporters attended, short of the five hundred that Grundmann had predicted. Counter-protesters outnumbered participants ten-to-one.

=== Boston, Massachusetts, United States (2019) ===
Amateur video showing police arresting a counter-protester at the August 2019 Boston Straight Pride Parade

The group Super Happy Fun America (SHFA) organized an August 2019 "Straight Pride Parade" that attracted several hundred participants and thousands of protesters. Counter-protesters vastly outnumbered attendees of the parade. SHFA called the event "a response to the identity politics of the left". Emerson College's president M. Lee Pelton warned about the event, as the parade route bordered the college campus, starting at Copley Square and ending at Boston City Hall. He said the event represented "fear and ignorance, humanity's most potent cocktail, masquerading as freedom of speech". SHFA organizer Samson Racioppi responded by asking for a retraction and apology.

The SHFA group was created in 2017 by Kyle Chapman, who founded the group Fraternal Order of the Alt-Knights a week after the Charlottesville Unite the Right riot. Staff includes president John Hugo, a former Republican Congressional candidate, and vice president Mark Sahady, "a member of the right-wing group Resist Marxism, who has organized several right-wing demonstrations in the past". SHFA announced the event in June 2019. Racioppi, Sahady, and Hugo contacted the police in early July 2019 when envelopes filled with glitter were mailed to them. One of the event's attendees, Marky Hutt, had previously founded a group for gay Trump supporters; he said the organizers of the Straight Pride event had invited him to attend, and he was present at the event with his fiancé.

Thirty-six counter-protesters were arrested at the event. Boston City Councillor Michelle Wu suggested that police tactics and choice of equipment raised tensions between police and counter-protesters.

=== Boise, Idaho, United States (2025) ===
The Heterosexual Awesomeness Festival, or Hetero Awesome Fest, was a two-day straight pride event held in Boise, Idaho, in June 2025. The festival was held at Cecil D. Andrus Park. It had a budget of $85,000. Dozens of people attended the festival.

The festival was organized by Mark Fitzpatrick, who has also organized Heterosexual Awesomeness Month and started the 501(c)(3) organization Heterosexual Awesomeness Inc. According to The Hill, Fitzpatrick was "inspired to create the June events when he and his family were discussing how to spend his daughter's birthday last year. He said they could not go to downtown Boise, where Pride events were held." During the event, singer-songwriter Daniel Hamrick (also known as Archer Flynn) tricked organizers by performing the song "Boy", which has been described as "a haunting piece about a trans child enduring forced conformity and societal cruelty". He wore a T-shirt with the text "Keep Canyon County Queer" and a jacket with rainbow patches. Fitzpatrick removed the singer from the stage.

=== Kraków, Poland (2026) ===
Since early 2026, an informal group called "Polska Hetero" ("Hetero Poland") has been throwing a public party near the Kraków Cloth Hall.

== Legal issues ==
"All students benefit from the respectful and thoughtful exchange of ideas and sharing of beliefs and practices. Schools, in particular, are environments that can provide education of both the substance of diversity and the responsible manner with which such diversity is approached and expressed"

— Judge Donovan Frank closing Chambers v. Babbitt (2001)

In 2001, Woodbury High School in Woodbury, Minnesota, created homophobia-free areas called "safe zones" for gay students. These were advertised by posters marked with an inverted pink triangle. Student Elliot Chambers reacted by wearing a makeshift sweatshirt with the slogan "Straight Pride" and the image of male and female stick figures holding hands. In light of previous anti-gay incidents, the school's principal ordered Chambers to remove the shirt, and a court case ensued. A court upheld Chambers's complaint that his First Amendment rights had been violated and that the principal's decision was unjustified. Although praising the principal's intentions, the judge explained that views of both sides of the debate should be allowed and that such issues should be resolved within the school's community, not within the court system.

Based on the precedent of Tinker v. Des Moines Independent Community School District, the court stated that the substantial disruptions claimed by the school must be shown to have some connection to Chambers's sweatshirt message of "Straight Pride".

In 2010, in response to suicides among LGBTQ people, an Ally Week was held at St. Charles North High School in St. Charles, Illinois. On the first day of this Ally Week, three students arrived wearing "Straight Pride" T-shirts. The back of these T-shirts displayed "Leviticus 20:13," a Bible verse stating that men who perform homosexual acts should be put to death. While the school did not force the students to remove their T-shirts, it did persuade them to remove the Bible quotation. The following day, two different students arrived wearing "Straight Pride" T-shirts without the Bible quotations and were consequently asked to remove their shirts.

=== Balancing freedom of expression vs. protection of students ===
In school environments, straight pride expressions and events have been reviewed within a framework of balancing freedom of expression with the protection of other students. In some situations, disputes have arisen over how schools balance protections for LGBTQ students with freedom of expression.

Schools have restricted clothing that displays references to sexual orientation, sometimes prompting lawsuits. In the Minnesota Chambers v. Babbitt case, "The court noted that maintaining a school community of tolerance includes tolerance of such viewpoints as expressed by 'Straight Pride' as well as tolerance of homosexuality." Students (including openly gay students) who are valued and respected are "more likely to learn and achieve than students who are not".

== See also ==
- Attraction to transgender people
- Heteronormativity
- Heterosexism
- Homophobia
- Gay agenda, disparaging term used by opponents of gay rights activism
- Gay Shame, a reaction against the mercantilism and depoliticization of gay pride
- Sexual diversity
- Opposition to LGBTQ rights
- LGBTQ youth vulnerability
- Religion and LGBT people
  - Homosexuality and religion
  - LGBTQ-affirming religious groups
  - Transgender people and religion
- Same-sex union legislation
  - Legal status of same-sex marriage
- Sexuality and gender identity-based cultures
