= Milo Yiannopoulos =

British political commentator (born 1984)

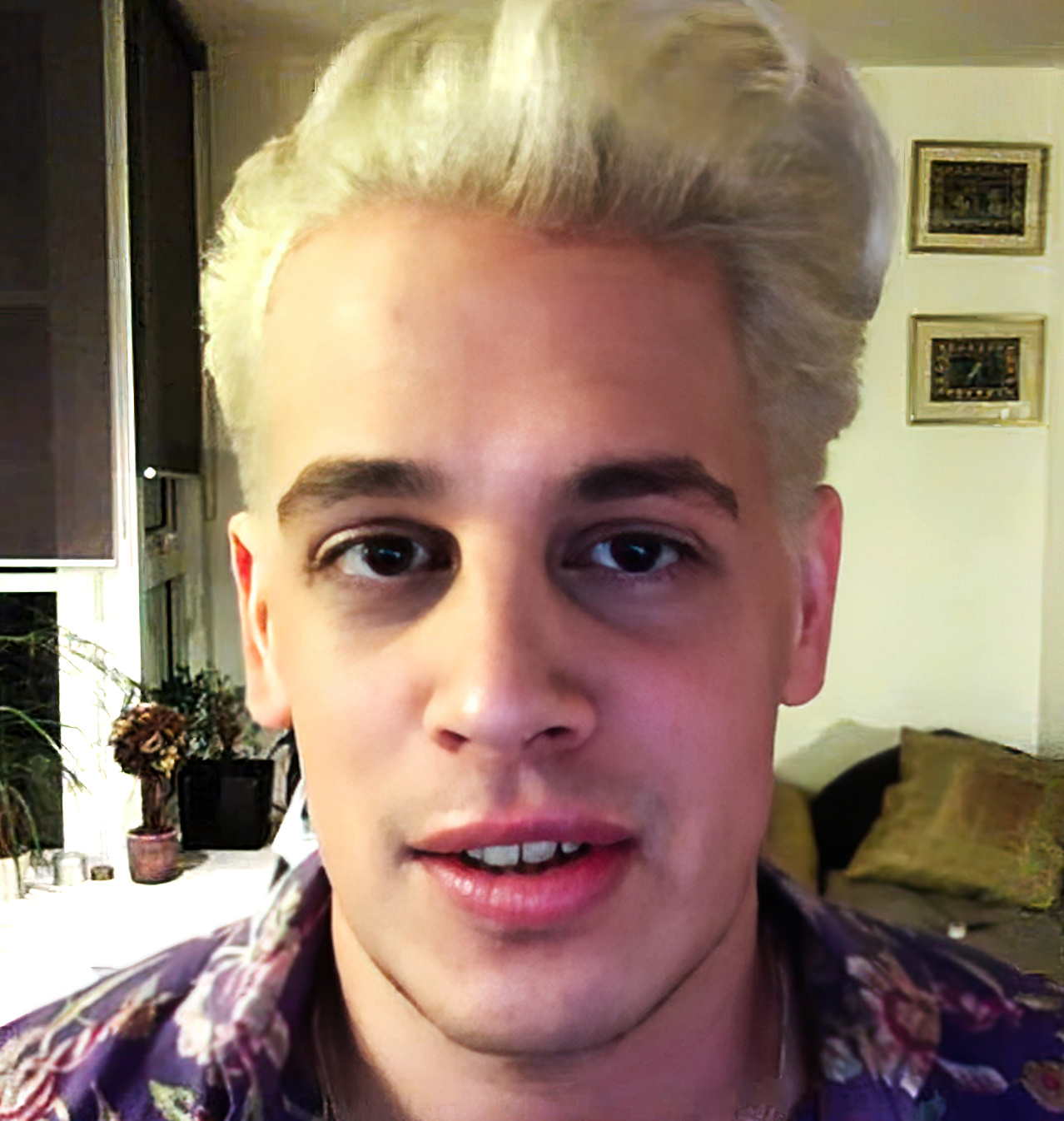
- Yiannopoulos in 2016
- Born: Milo Hanrahan; 18 October 1984 (age 42); Chatham, Kent, England
- Other name: Milo Andreas Wagner (occasional pen name)
- Occupations: Writer; activist
- Years active: 2007–present
- Movement: Far-right; alt-right; alt-lite

Milo Yiannopoulos (/jəˈnɒpələs/ yə-NOP-əl-əs; né Hanrahan, Greek: Μίλο Γιαννόπουλος; born 18 October 1984) is a British far-right conspiratorial political commentator, known for his opposition to Islam, feminism, and social justice. He is a former editor of Breitbart News, an American far-right news and opinion website.

Yiannopoulos worked for Breitbart from 2014 to 2017, during which time he became a significant voice in the Gamergate controversy. In July 2016, he was banned from Twitter for online harassment of actress Leslie Jones. He was permanently banned from Facebook in 2019. Yiannopoulos solicited white nationalists, such as American Renaissance editor Devin Saucier, for story ideas and editing suggestions during his tenure at Breitbart.

In 2017, video clips circulated of Yiannopoulos stating that sexual relationships between 13-year-old boys and adults could be "perfectly consensual" and positive experiences for adolescents. Following backlash, Yiannopoulos resigned his position at Breitbart, his invitation to speak before the Conservative Political Action Conference (CPAC) was rescinded, and Simon & Schuster cancelled a contract to publish his autobiography. In response, Yiannopoulos condemned sexual abuse, stated that he was referring to adolescent gay males rather than prepubescent boys, and that his statements reflected a humorous means of handling his own sexual abuse and experience with a priest.

In 2022, Yiannopoulos served as an intern for United States Congresswoman Marjorie Taylor Greene, later working with white nationalist Nick Fuentes, and rapper Kanye West on the latter's short-lived 2024 U.S. presidential election campaign. In April 2024, Yiannopoulos was listed as Chief of Staff at Yeezy Apparel, but resigned the following month due to West's announcement of an adult entertainment division at the company. As of 2026, Yiannopoulos has resumed work with West, serving as his spokesperson and legal liaison.

In August 2026, Yiannopoulos was detained by U.S. Immigration and Customs Enforcement (ICE), due to an immigration judge issuing a final order of removal the prior month after he failed to appear at a hearing. He was deported to the United Kingdom on 28 August 2026.

== Early life and education ==
Born as Milo Hanrahan, Yiannopoulos was born and raised in Chatham, Kent, England. His father has Greek and Irish ancestry and his mother is German born. He is described as a practising Roman Catholic. His parents divorced when he was a child. Yiannopoulos' mother is Jewish. Yiannopoulos has referred to himself as Jewish; according to the BBC, his maternal grandmother was Jewish. Raised by his mother and her second husband, Yiannopoulos has stated that he did not have a good relationship with his stepfather. As a teenager, Yiannopoulos lived with his paternal grandmother whose surname, Yiannopoulos, he later adopted.

Yiannopoulos was educated at Simon Langton Grammar School for Boys in Canterbury from which he has said he was expelled. He attended the University of Manchester but dropped out before graduating; he then read English at Wolfson College, Cambridge, but was expelled in 2010.

== Career ==
After he was kicked out of university, Yiannopoulos initially secured a job at The Catholic Herald. In 2009, Yiannopoulos moved to technology journalism with The Daily Telegraph. His Telegraph columnist biography described him in 2009 as one who "writes sceptically about Web 2.0 and social media but enthusiastically about the internet in general."

=== The Kernel ===
In November 2011, Yiannopoulos co-founded The Kernel. In March 2013, The Kernel was shut down amidst allegations of unpaid wages, at a time when Yiannopoulos was editor in chief and sole director of its parent company, Sentinel Media. It was reopened later that year under Kernel Media, with Yiannopoulos remaining as editor in chief and having privately settled the previous debts.

In 2014, The Kernel was acquired by Daily Dot Media, the parent company of The Daily Dot. After the acquisition by Daily Dot Media, Yiannopoulos stepped down as editor in chief, although he remained an advisor to the company.

=== Breitbart News ===
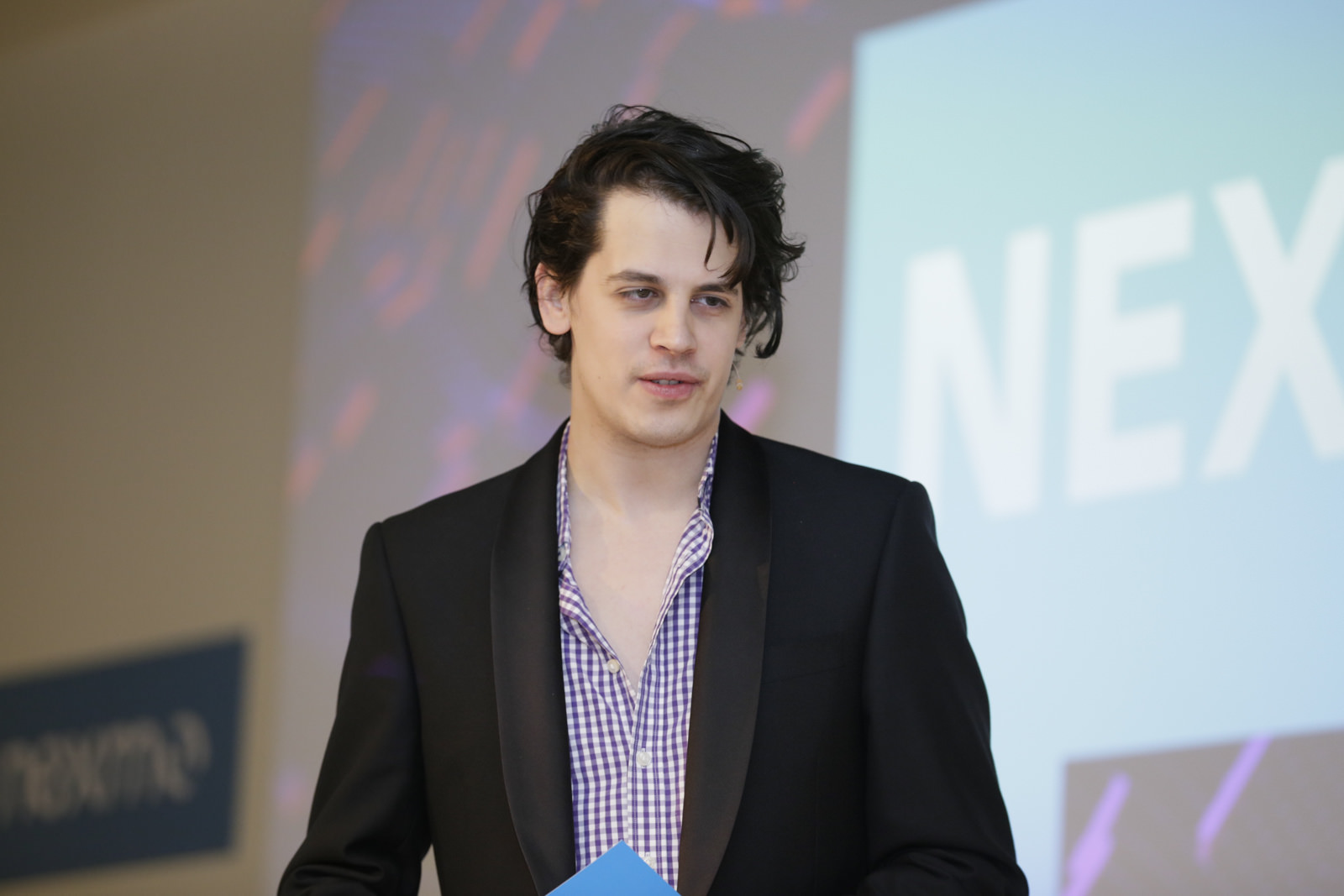
Yiannopoulos speaking in Berlin in 2014

In 2014, Yiannopoulos started writing for Breitbart News, and in October 2015, Breitbart placed Yiannopoulos in charge of its new "Breitbart Tech" section. The site had six full-time staff, including esports specialist Richard Lewis, and was edited by Yiannopoulos until his resignation on 21 February 2017.

==== Gamergate ====
In 2014, Yiannopoulos emerged as a "lead actor" in the Gamergate harassment campaign through his work at Breitbart, becoming one of the most vocal of Gamergate's supporters. Yiannopoulos employed Gamergate as a basis for online attacks on women, and his role in Gamergate allowed him to become one of the central figures in the mainstream growth of the alt-right. Before Gamergate, Yiannopoulos referred to gamers as "pungent beta male bollock scratchers" and also said that "few things are more embarrassing than grown men getting over excited about video games".

==== Association with neo-Nazism and the alt-right ====
In early October 2017, BuzzFeed News published leaked email chains from Yiannopoulos' tenure at Breitbart. According to the report, Yiannopoulos and his ghostwriter Allum Bokhari regularly solicited ideas for stories and comments from people associated with the alt-right and neo-Nazi movements. Among the figures Yiannopoulos contacted were Curtis Yarvin, a central figure of the neoreactionary movement; Devin Saucier, the editor of the white supremacist magazine American Renaissance; Andrew Auernheimer, the administrator of neo-Nazi website The Daily Stormer; and Baked Alaska, a commentator known for his antisemitic and pro-Nazi tweets.

The story also reported that Yiannopoulos had a penchant for using personal passwords with antisemitic overtones, such as "Kristall", a reference to Kristallnacht, and "longknives1290", a compound reference to the Night of the Long Knives and the Edict of Expulsion.

In a Breitbart article, Yiannopoulos and a co-author described the alt-right movement as "dangerously bright". The Tablet stated that many of these intellectual backers write for publications it describes as racist and antisemitic, such as VDARE and American Renaissance. The Breitbart article was criticised by opponents of the alt-right for excusing the extremist elements of the movement, and also by the neo-Nazi website The Daily Stormer which holds that racism and antisemitism are pillars of the alt-right.

The Anti-Defamation League classifies Yiannopoulos as part of the alt-lite, a term used to distinguish individuals sometimes associated with the alt-right from those who are openly white nationalist and antisemitic. These accusations, as well as Yiannopoulos's support for Donald Trump, have contributed to a feud between Yiannopoulos and Ben Shapiro, a Jewish conservative political commentator who refused to support Trump in the 2016 presidential election. Shapiro accused Yiannopoulos, his followers, and other Trump supporters of racist and antisemitic behaviour. He criticised Yiannopoulos's attempts to distinguish between real racist or bigoted behaviour and trolling, stating that "words have meaning" and that the distinction that Yiannopoulos was attempting to make "simply doesn't exist in objective reality".

In 2017, Yiannopoulos was depicted singing "America the Beautiful" at a karaoke bar, where a crowd of neo-Nazis and white supremacists, including Richard B. Spencer, cheered him with the Nazi Sieg Heil salute. In response, Yiannopoulos denied observing the Nazi salutes while he was singing, citing what he claimed to be "extreme myopia". According to the bartender who was working on the night of the incident, Yiannopoulos, Spencer and their entourage came into the bar and asked to sing karaoke even though it had ended. When the bartender saw the Nazi salutes she rushed the stage and told Yiannopoulos and his friends to leave, at which point they began harassing her, chanting "Trump! Trump! Trump!" and "Make America Great Again!". According to her, Yiannopoulos was getting the others "roused".

Following these revelations, billionaire Robert Mercer ceased his support for Yiannopoulos and condemned him, as did Yiannopoulos's former employer Steve Bannon.

In November 2019, Yiannopoulos released an audio recording which appeared to feature Spencer using the racial slurs "octaroons" and "kikes", referring respectively to African Americans and Jewish people. The recording appeared to date from the immediate aftermath of the Unite the Right rally in Charlottesville in 2017 and the murder of Heather Heyer.

=== Social media controversies and bans ===
In December 2015, Twitter briefly suspended Yiannopoulos' account after he changed his profile to describe himself as BuzzFeed's "social justice editor." His Twitter account's blue "verification" checkmark was removed by the site the following month. Twitter declined to explain its removal, saying they do not comment on individual cases. Some news outlets speculated that Yiannopoulos had violated its speech and harassment codes, as with an instance where he told another user that they "deserved to be harassed." Others worried that Twitter was targeting conservatives.

In July 2016, Yiannopoulos panned the Ghostbusters reboot as "a movie to help lonely middle-aged women feel better about being left on the shelf." After the film's release, Twitter trolls attacked African-American actress Leslie Jones with racial slurs. Yiannopoulos wrote three public tweets about Jones, saying "Ghostbusters is doing so badly they've deployed Leslie Jones to play the victim on Twitter," before describing her reply to him as "barely literate" and then calling her a "black dude". Multiple media outlets have described Yiannopoulos' tweets as encouraging the abuse directed at Jones. Yiannopoulos was then banned by Twitter for what the company cited as "inciting or engaging in the targeted abuse or harassment of others". He later stated that he was banned because of his conservative beliefs. In November 2022, a month after Musk purchased the platform, he reinstated a number of suspended accounts, including Yiannpoulos'.

In May 2019, Yiannopoulos and several others active in politics and culture, including Nation of Islam leader Louis Farrakhan and conspiracy theorists and fellow right-wing pundits Alex Jones and Paul Joseph Watson, were permanently banned from Facebook, which called them "dangerous". "We've always banned individuals or organizations that promote or engage in violence and hate, regardless of ideology", a Facebook spokesperson said. "The process for evaluating potential violators is extensive and it is what led us to our decision to remove these accounts today."

=== Tours ===
Yiannopoulos has appeared on a number of controversial tours, beginning in 2015 with The Dangerous Faggot Tour, encompassing universities in the United States and the United Kingdom. Although few of his American speeches were cancelled, many were met with protests ranging from vocal disruptions to violent demonstrations. Yiannopoulos has had visas denied or cancelled on multiple occasions.

In January 2017, Yiannopoulos spoke at the University of Washington. The event led to large protests. A 34-year-old man was shot while protesting and suffered life-threatening injuries. A witness recalled seeing someone release pepper spray in the crowd, which triggered the shooting confrontation.

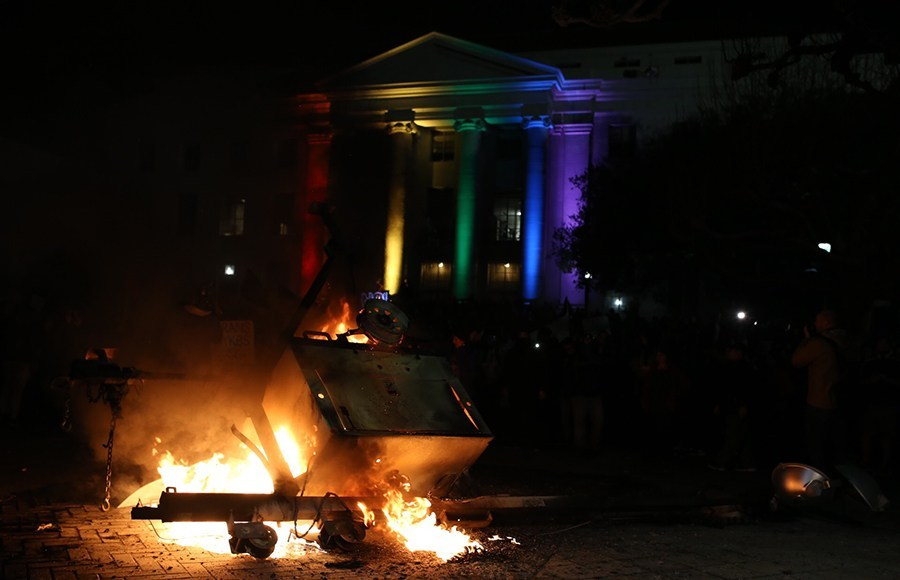
Property damage in Sproul Plaza resulting from the 2017 protest

On 1 February 2017, Yiannopoulos was scheduled to make a speech at UC Berkeley. More than 100 UC Berkeley faculty had signed a petition demanding the university cancel the event. Over 1,500 people gathered to protest against the event on the steps of Sproul Hall, with some violence breaking out. According to the university, around 150 masked agitators came onto campus and interrupted the protest, setting fires, damaging property, throwing fireworks, attacking members of the crowd, and throwing rocks at the police. These violent protesters included members of BAMN, who threw rocks at police, shattered windows, threw Molotov cocktails, and later vandalised downtown Berkeley. Among those assaulted were a Syrian Muslim in a suit who was pepper sprayed and hit with a rod by a protester who said "You look like a Nazi", and a woman who was pepper sprayed while being interviewed by a TV reporter. Citing security concerns, the UC Police Department cancelled the event. One person was arrested for failure to disperse, and there was about $100,000 in damage. The police were criticised for their "hands off" policy whereby they did not arrest any of the demonstrators who committed assault, vandalism, or arson. Berkeley police reported at least 11 arrests, but no injuries or damage to buildings. UC Berkeley spokesman Dan Mogulof said afterwards that the media event amounted to "the most expensive photo op in the university's history."

In November 2017, Yiannopoulos began a tour of Australia, visiting Sydney, Melbourne, Gold Coast, Adelaide and Perth. During the Adelaide show, Yiannopoulos stirred controversy by projecting an unflattering photo of the feminist writer Clementine Ford, taken when she was a teenager, with the word 'UNFUCKABLE' superimposed over the top. During events in Melbourne, he again stirred controversy when he described Australian Aboriginal art as "crap" and "really shit". Seven people were arrested after clashing with police and outside the venue for Yiannopoulos's Sydney event. Yiannopoulos claimed the violence was caused by "the left, showing up, being violent to stop freedom of speech". There was also violence outside his Melbourne events as protesters from the left-aligned Campaign Against Racism and Fascism and right-wing True Blue Crew clashed, eventually triggering a response by riot police, who used pepper spray to control the crowd. Victoria Police subsequently issued tour organisers a bill for $50,000 for the extra police resources deployed at the event, a move promoter Damien Costas labelled as "political grandstanding".

=== Books ===
Yiannopoulos published two poetry books under the name Milo Andreas Wagner. His 2007 release Eskimo Papoose was later scrutinised for re-using lines from pop music and television without attribution, to which he replied that it was done deliberately and that the work was satirical.

An autobiography titled Dangerous was announced in December 2016. Yiannopoulos received an $80,000 advance payment from the book's planned publisher, Simon & Schuster. It was intended to be published under their Threshold Editions. A day after its announcement, pre-sales for the book elevated it to first place on Amazon.com's list of best-sellers.

In February 2017, Simon & Schuster cancelled its plans to publish the book in the wake of the video and sexual-consent comments controversy that also led to CPAC withdrawing its speaking invitation and Yiannopoulos resigning from Breitbart. Yiannopoulos began litigation against Simon & Schuster for "breach of contract" and "breach of the covenant of good faith and fair dealing", seeking $10 million in damages. He dropped the suit in February 2018.

In May 2017, Yiannopoulos announced that he would self-publish the book on 4 July 2017. Soon after the announcement, the book became the best-selling political humour book on Amazon. The book was a New York Times, Wall Street Journal and USA Today bestseller. The book further peaked at No. 1 on Publishers Weekly's nonfiction bestseller list and at No. 2 on the New York Times nonfiction bestseller list.

Yiannopoulos published the book Diabolical: How Pope Francis Has Betrayed Clerical Abuse Victims Like Me – and Why He Has to Go in 2018. He stated: "The main purpose of writing this new book was to talk about the homosexual cancer that has infected the Vatican". The book repeated the discredited claim that paedophilia and homosexuality are linked. Yiannopoulos promoted the book through Michael Voris, a traditionalist Catholic, celibate bisexual and anti-LGBT activist.

Yiannopoulos's self-published books How to Be Poor and How to Be Straight were also released in 2019. The former was released after the revelation of his alleged insolvency. He also wrote The Trial of Roger Stone and Middle Rages: Why the Battle for Medieval Studies Matters to America, which discussed controversies surrounding Rachel Fulton Brown, a professor of medieval studies at the University of Chicago.

=== Yiannopoulos Privilege Grant ===
In January 2016, Yiannopoulos set up his Privilege Grant for white men to balance scholarships for women and minorities. He participated in an online telethon to raise money for the grant and in August 2016, reported that approximately $100,000 had been received in donations and a further $250,000 had been pledged.

In August 2016, it was revealed that over a quarter of a million dollars had gone missing from the Yiannopoulos Privilege Grant. Yiannopoulos apologised for mismanaging the grant and denied that he had spent the money. In March 2018, Yiannopoulos confirmed that the fund had been closed down.

=== Kanye West ===
In 2022, Yiannopoulos briefly worked with rapper Kanye West on his 2024 presidential election campaign. Yiannopoulos claimed that he arranged the well-publicised November 2022 dinner between Trump, West and far-right commentator Nick Fuentes to "make Trump's life miserable". "I also wanted to send a message to Trump that he has systematically repeatedly neglected, ignored, abused the people who love him the most, the people who put him in office, and that kind of behavior comes back to bite you in the end," he said. In March 2023, Yiannopoulos published material on his Telegram channel about Stop the Steal founder Ali Alexander, who had also worked on the Kanye West campaign. Yiannopoulos alleged that Alexander had been propositioning teenage boys for sex and soliciting sexually-explicit photographs and videos from them. In May 2023, Yiannopoulos was rehired by West to run his campaign.

In April 2024, Yiannopoulos was listed as Chief of Staff at Yeezy Apparel, but resigned the following month due to West's announcement of an adult entertainment division at the company. As of 2026, Yiannopoulos has resumed work with West, serving as his spokesperson and legal liaison.

== Views ==
=== Political beliefs ===
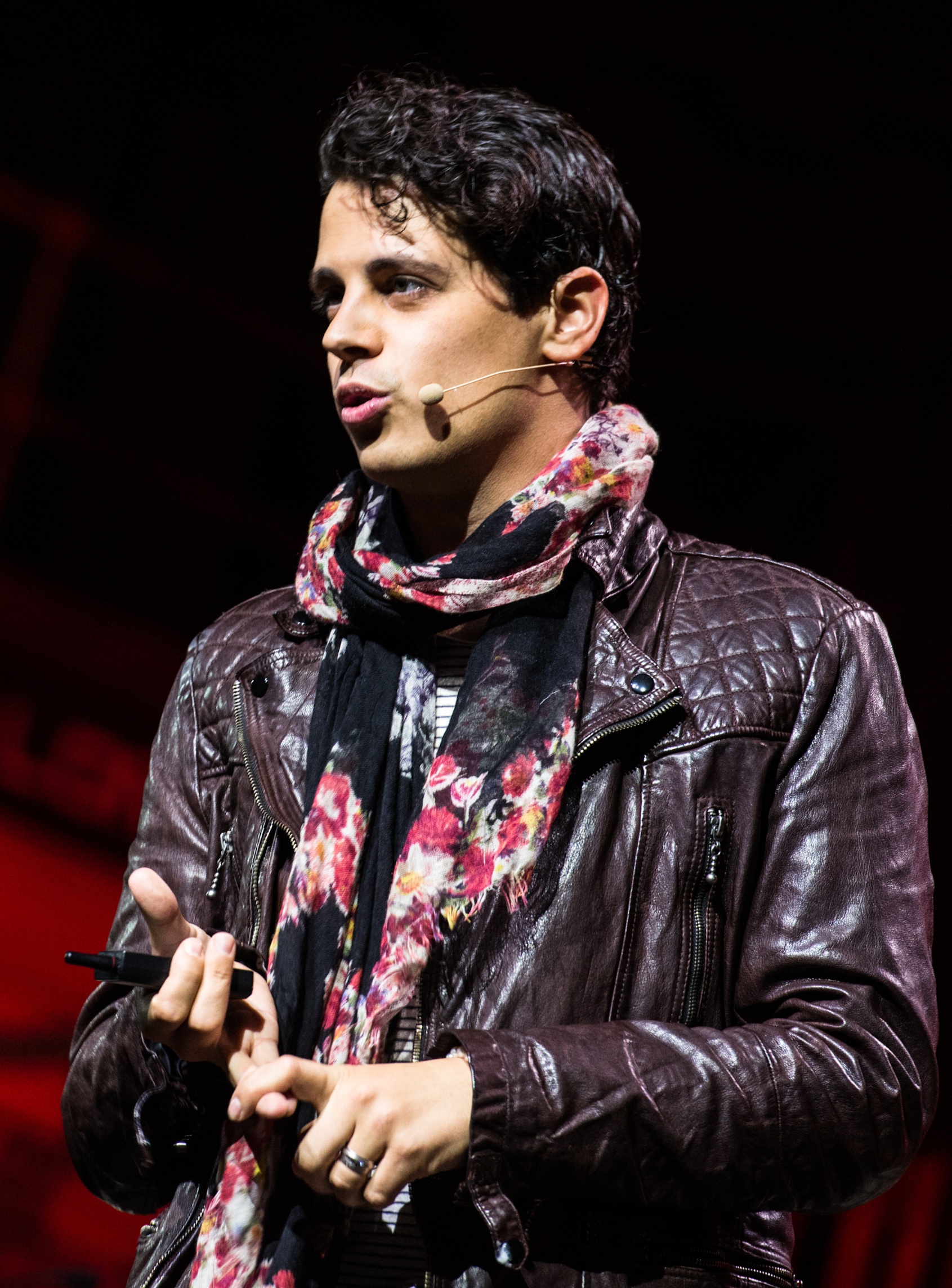
Yiannopoulos during a speech in London, 2013

In the United Kingdom, Yiannopoulos supported the Conservative Party before applying to join the UK Independence Party in June 2018. A former supporter of Donald Trump, and a person who was compared to Ann Coulter, he has been referred to as the "face of a political movement", but he says his real concerns are "pop culture and free speech". In December 2020, Yiannopoulos denounced Trump, saying that "Trump's SCOTUS appointments were pointless. We defended a selfish clown for nothing", and that he would dedicate "the rest of my life to the destruction of the Republican Party".

=== Islam ===
Yiannopoulos is a frequent critic of Islam and has said the "fear of Islam is entirely rational". He has blamed Islam, not just extremist groups and terrorists, for violence against women and homosexuals. Yiannopoulos said "I'm not talking about Islamists. I'm not talking about terrorists. I'm not talking about radical Islam. I'm talking about mainstream Muslim culture".

Following the June 2016 Orlando nightclub shooting, Yiannopoulos claimed that all of Islam, not simply a small group of radicals, was responsible for mistreating women and homosexuals. After Yiannopoulos was nominated to become to be the rector of the University of Glasgow, Milo said he would protect LGBT students by shutting down the Muslim Students Association. Shortly after the Manchester Arena bombing, Yiannopoulos strongly criticised singer Ariana Grande, characterising her as pro-Islam and saying, "Sadly, Ariana Grande is too stupid to wise up and warn her European fans about the real threats to their freedom and their lives. She will remain ferociously pro-immigrant, pro-Islam and anti-America. Makes you wonder whether they bombed to attack her or in solidarity".

Yiannopoulos has been described as a counter-jihadist, and spoke alongside notable members of the movement such as Pamela Geller and Geert Wilders at the Gays for Trump "Wake Up!" party in the aftermath of the Orlando attack.

Yiannopoulos described social attitudes of Western Muslims as "horribly regressive". He has attempted to distinguish his opposition to Muslim immigration into the West from racism. After the 2019 Christchurch mosque shootings, Yiannopoulos said that he condemned the violence but wrote on Facebook that attacks like that happen "because the establishment panders to and mollycoddles extremist leftism and barbaric, alien religious cultures". He was criticised for this description and banned from making a forthcoming speaking tour in Australia in 2019.

=== Women and feminism ===
Yiannopoulos is a frequent critic of feminism and "dumpy lesbians". He has frequently written articles that have been criticised as misogynistic. In a Breitbart article titled "Birth Control Makes Women Unattractive and Crazy", he asserts that the combined oral contraceptive pill causes women to become hysterical, sexually promiscuous and obese. He declared his birthday "World Patriarchy Day". In 2016, Yiannopoulos published a Breitbart article entitled "Would You Rather Your Child Had Feminism Or Cancer?"

Yiannopoulos describes feminists as "easy to wind up", is critical of the idea of a gender pay gap and claims that feminism has become "a mean, vindictive, sociopathic, man-hating movement". Yiannopoulos favours banning women from military combat units.

In January 2018, Yiannopoulos reported a fictitious news story, written by a spoof news site, as being true. The article claimed that an English High Court had ruled that the National Health Service was legally obliged to offer cervical smear tests to men. Unaware the story was satirical in nature, Yiannopoulos argued that the story exemplified the thinking of those living in "feminist clown world". Before reading out the article verbatim, Yiannopoulos insisted that he had researched the story and promised that "this is real, I haven't just made this up".

=== Paedophilia and child sexual abuse ===
In February 2017, it was announced that Yiannopoulos would address the Conservative Political Action Conference (CPAC). A conservative website, Reagan Battalion, then posted video of 2015 and 2016 clips of YouTube interviews at the request of a 16-year-old Canadian student who was opposed to Yiannopoulos' CPAC address.

In the interview from a January 2016 episode of the podcast Drunken Peasants, Yiannopoulos stated that sexual relationships between 13-year-old boys and adults can "happen perfectly consensually", because some 13-year-olds are, in his view, sexually and emotionally mature enough to consent to sex with adults; he spoke favourably both of gay 13-year-old boys having sex with adult men and straight 13-year-old boys having sex with adult women. He used his own experience as an example, saying he was mature enough to be capable of giving consent at a young age. He also stated that "paedophilia is not a sexual attraction to somebody 13 years old, who is sexually mature" but rather that "paedophilia is attraction to children who have not reached puberty". Later in the interview, after his previous comments received some pushback from the hosts, he stated: "I think the age of consent law is probably about right, that is probably roughly the right age ... but there are certainly people who are capable of giving consent at a younger age, I certainly consider myself to be one of them."

Yiannopoulos subsequently held a press conference, at which he said he had been molested as a child, and that his comments were a way to cope with it. He declined to identify his abusers or discuss the incidents in any detail. He characterised his comments as the "usual blend of British sarcasm, provocation and gallows humour", and denied condoning child sexual abuse. He alleged that the video had been edited to give a misleading impression, and stated, "I will not apologise for dealing with my life experiences in the best way that I can, which is humour. No one can tell me or anyone else who has lived through sexual abuse how to deal with those emotions. But I am sorry to other abuse victims if my own personal way of dealing with what happened to me has hurt you." In response to the controversy, Simon & Schuster cancelled its plans to publish his autobiography in June 2017. Media outlets reported on 20 February that Breitbart was considering terminating Yiannopoulos' contract as a result of the controversy. Yiannopoulos resigned from Breitbart on 21 February, reportedly under pressure to do so.

Yiannopoulos was later criticised for attending Hollywood "boat parties" and "house parties" in which boys he described as "very young—very young" were sexually abused, but failing to report the abusers to the authorities or to identify them during an appearance on The Joe Rogan Experience. When asked about this by Ryan Lizza of New York magazine, Yiannopoulos said he "didn't check anyone's I.D.s." and that he "had no idea what the ages of any of those people at the parties were." He stated that when he said "very young" he was assuming that they were sixteen or seventeen. He reiterated that he does not "advocate for any illegal behavior" or excuse it. On 10 March, an additional video emerged in which he said on a 2015 episode of Gavin McInnes's show that child sexual abuse is "really not that big a deal. You can't let it ruin your life". He described victims as "whinging selfish brats" for "suddenly" remembering they were abused and deciding it was a problem 20 years after the abuse occurred.

On 5 August 2024, Yiannopoulos tweeted "At 13, I was raped by a priest. His name was Fr Michael. He died years ago. I said some stupid shit trying to make sense of it which was used against me in 2017. The idea that this translates to 'Milo is a pedo' is so warped & dark that anyone who says it is dead to me. Forever."

=== Political violence ===
In 2018, Yiannopoulos told at least two news organizations that he wanted vigilantes to shoot journalists. He wrote in a text message "I can't wait for vigilante squads to start gunning journalists down on sight". Two days later, following a shooting at the Capital Gazette in Annapolis, Maryland, in which five people were killed, Yiannopoulos denied that his comments were responsible, adding that his remarks were a joke. He later posted on Instagram that he sent the messages to troll journalists. On Facebook he wrote: "You're about to see a raft of news stories claiming that I am responsible for inspiring the deaths of journalists" and "The truth, as always, is the opposite of what the media tells you."

In October 2018, following several instances in which pipe bombs had been sent to Trump critics, Yiannopoulos posted the following comment on Instagram: "Just catching up with news of all these pipe bombs. Disgusting and sad (that they didn't go off, and The Daily Beast didn't get one)". After initially refusing to remove the comment when it was reported as hate speech, Instagram later deleted the post.

=== Gender and sexuality ===
In July 2017, Yiannopoulos supported Trump's ban on transgender personnel in the United States military, going further to suggest Trump should also ban women from frontline combat units.

In October 2017, less than a month after marrying his boyfriend of ten years in a civil ceremony, Yiannopoulos opposed same-sex marriage in Australia, arguing that a yes-vote would violate religious freedoms. He also reiterated his belief that homosexuality is a sin and denounced those (including clergy) who sought to change Church dogma on the issue. "You don't see me disputing the Church's teachings on homosexuality ... I wouldn't dream of demanding that the Church throw away her hard truths just to lie to me in hopes I'll feel better about myself", he said.

In August 2019, Yiannopoulos was grand marshal for a straight pride parade in Boston, organised by a group called Super Happy Fun America. The parade was ostensibly to celebrate heterosexuality.

In March 2021, Yiannopoulos declared to the LifeSiteNews website that he was an ex-gay and would begin advocating on behalf of improving the public image of gay conversion therapy. In June 2021, Yiannopoulos announced that he was fundraising for a gay conversion therapy centre in Florida.

== Personal life ==
In 2017, Yiannopoulos was a U.S. resident alien on O-1 visa status. Milo married his long-term boyfriend in Hawaii in September 2017. In March 2021, during an interview with right-wing publication LifeSiteNews, Yiannopoulos stated he was no longer homosexual and that his husband had been "demoted to housemate". Also in 2021, Yiannopoulos announced that he had returned to Roman Catholicism.

As of April 2026, he is in a divorce case with his estranged husband.

In September 2026, Yiannopoulos acknowledged in an interview with Piers Morgan that he was still gay, while stating that he was no longer sexually active.

=== Debt ===
In December 2018, his former Australian tour promoters, Australian Events Management, reported that Yiannopoulos had accrued more than $2 million in unpaid debt: $1.6 million to his own company, $400,000 to the Mercer Family Foundation, $153,215 to his former lawyers, $76,574 to former collaborator and Breitbart writer Allum Bokhari, and $20,000 to the luxury brand Cartier.

=== 2026 deportation from the United States ===
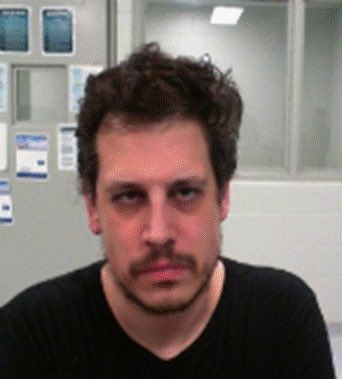
Yiannopoulos's immigration detention photograph, released by the Department of Homeland Security in August 2026

On 27 August 2026, Yiannopoulos was detained by U.S. Immigration and Customs Enforcement (ICE) at Louis Armstrong New Orleans International Airport in Kenner, Louisiana. According to a Department of Homeland Security spokesperson, Yiannopoulos had legally entered the United States on 14 May 2019 through New York City but overstayed, and was issued a final order of removal by an immigration judge on 22 July 2026 after failing to appear at his immigration hearing. He was held at an ICE detention facility in Alexandria, Louisiana. Yiannopoulos was in Louisiana ahead of a concert by Kanye West. Far-right activist Laura Loomer, with whom he had publicly fallen out, took credit for first drawing attention to his immigration status, having previously alleged that he had overstayed his visa. On 28 August 2026, the day after his detention, Yiannopoulos was deported to the United Kingdom. The Department of Homeland Security released his immigration detention photograph online alongside a warning that other immigrants should "take control of their departure" by self-deporting. The New York Times reported that Yiannopoulos had lived in the United States for more than a decade, having joined the staff of Breitbart News on a nonimmigrant visa reserved for people with "extraordinary ability", and that he did not respond to requests for comment.

In an interview with Piers Morgan following his deportation, Yiannopoulos said he was "really, really terrified" while in ICE custody, and was "ashamed" to have supported Trump previously.

== Books ==
- Dangerous. Threshold Editions. 2017. ISBN 978-0-692-89344-9.
- Diabolical: How Pope Francis Has Betrayed Clerical Abuse Victims Like Me—And Why He Has to Go. Bombardier Books. 2018. ISBN 9781642931631.
- How to Be Poor. 2019. ISBN 978-9527303535
- How to Be Straight. 2019. ISBN 978-9527303566
- Middle Rages: Why the Battle for Medieval Studies Matters to America. 2019. ISBN 978-9527303559
- The Trial of Roger Stone. 2020. ISBN 978-9527303597

Forewords

- SJWs Always Lie—Taking Down the Thought Police. 2015. Castalia Press. ISBN 9789527065686
- Forbidden Thoughts. 2017. Subversive Press. ISBN 0994516347
- No Campus for White Men: The Transformation of Higher Education into Hateful Indoctrination. 2017. WND Books. ISBN 1944229620
- Jordanetics: A Journey into the Mind of Humanity's Greatest Thinker. 2018. Castalia Press. ISBN 9527065690
