= Super Happy Fun America =

Political organization based in Massachusetts

- Formation: 2019; 7 years ago
- Founders: John Hugo, Mark Sahady, Samson Racioppi
- Type: Non-profit organization
- Legal status: 501(c)(4)
- Location: Massachusetts, United States
- Website: superhappyfunamerica.com

Super Happy Fun America (SHFA) is a US right-wing political organization. SHFA and its leaders are known for their ties to white nationalism and the far-right, and the organization has been described by The Daily Beast as a front for the far-right organization Resist Marxism. The group first became known for organizing the 2019 Boston Straight Pride Parade, a parade which attracted several hundred participants and thousands of counterprotesters. In addition to rallying in support of "straight pride", the group has opposed COVID-19 prevention measures, vaccine mandates, and Black Lives Matter.

== History ==
Super Happy Fun America is a non-profit organization that was founded in 2019 by John Hugo, Mark Sahady, and Samson Racioppi. The president of the organization is John Hugo, a former congressional candidate who in 2018 unsuccessfully ran for election to represent Massachusetts' 5th Congressional District. According to Hugo, the organization's name was chosen to force journalists to repeat the absurd phrase in their reporting.

== Views ==
SHFA was created around the idea that straight people are an "oppressed majority". The group also holds broadly right-wing or far-right stances on various topics. They have opposed COVID-19 prevention measures like stay-at-home advisories and business closures, as well as COVID-19 vaccine mandates and requiring proof of vaccination. The group has rallied in support of law enforcement and in opposition to the Black Lives Matter movement. SHFA members have opposed the teaching about racism in schools, with Hugo saying that he believes racism is no longer a problem in America. SHFA opposes abortion. Members of the group also believe that Democrats and leftists are plotting to implement communism in the United States, with a goal of oppressing conservatives.

== Far-right and white nationalist ties ==
Super Happy Fun America has links to white nationalist individuals and organizations. The organization has been said to dog whistle white nationalists and alt-rightists, utilizing terms such as "western culture" and relating them not only to heterosexuality but to Caucasians and traditional values. The group has occasionally allied with the far-right Proud Boys organization. Extremism researchers described SHFA in February 2021 as a gateway to the far-right that "offer[s] people a socially acceptable entry point into extremism". The organization has publicly stated it opposes white nationalists and neo-Nazis, though researchers and journalists have cast doubt on the sincerity of these denouncements.

Many members of SHFA came from the now-defunct Resist Marxism, a far-right organization founded by Kyle Chapman. Some members of Resist Marxism were previously known for organizing the controversial 2017 Boston Free Speech Rally. Two of SHFA's founders, Mark Sahady and Samson Racioppi, were organizers for Resist Marxism; the third founder, John Hugo, was endorsed by Resist Marxism during his 2018 Congressional campaign. Following bad publicity stemming from the revelation of internal conversations showing the group using racist and antisemitic slurs and rhetoric, and fantasizing about attacking leftist activists, Resist Marxism disbanded. SHFA has been described by The Daily Beast as a "front" for Resist Marxism.

== Activities ==
=== 2019 Boston Straight Pride Parade ===
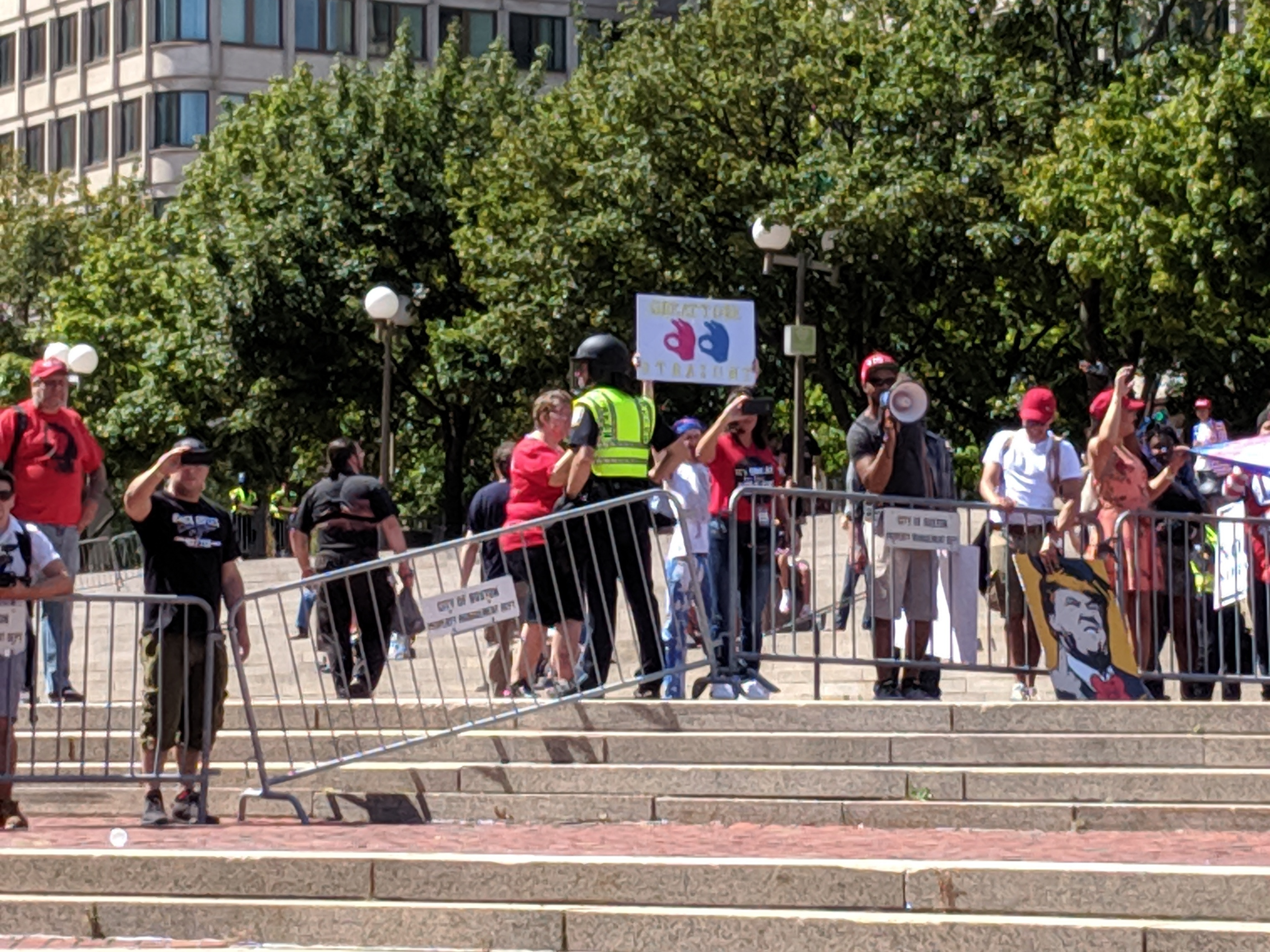
Boston Straight Pride Parade attendees on August 31, 2019. An attendee holds a sign depicting two hands making the 'OK' gesture.

Super Happy Fun America organized the August 31, 2019 Straight Pride Parade in Boston, Massachusetts, an event they described as "a response to the 'identity politics' of the left." The event attracted several hundred participants and thousands of counterprotesters, who vastly outnumbered participants of the parade. Thirty-four counterprotesters were arrested at the event. Boston city councilor Michelle Wu suggested that police tactics and choice of equipment raised tensions between police and counterprotesters.

On February 22, 2020, SHFA held a rally outside of the Boston Police headquarters. Organizers said the rally was intended to thank police for arresting counterprotesters at the August 2019 parade, and to show support for a recent deployment of U.S. Customs and Border Protection immigration officers to Boston. The rally was again outnumbered by counterprotesters, who said they wished to expose SHFA's ties with white nationalism. The rally ended two hours before schedule, and no arrests were made.

=== Protests in Washington, D.C. and the 2021 United States Capitol attack ===
In late 2020, following the 2020 United States presidential election, SHFA twice chartered buses to Washington, D.C. to protest what they believed to be a stolen election.

SHFA once again chartered six buses to bring around 300 people to the United States Capitol for the January 6 Donald Trump rally, which precipitated the Capitol attack later that day. One person who had ridden on the SHFA bus was arrested on January 6, though SHFA leaders said they did not know him. Two members of SHFA were subsequently arrested and charged with federal trespassing and disorderly conduct in relation to the attack, including SHFA cofounder and vice president Mark Sahady. Sahady later said he lost his software engineering job in backlash following the attack.

=== Other activities ===
SHFA were one of the hosts of the "Liberty Rally", an anti-lockdown protest held at the Massachusetts State House on May 4, 2020. The several hundred protesters who participated gathered to call for an end to the stay-at-home advisory and business closures that had been implemented to try to slow the spread of COVID-19 in Massachusetts. Protesters largely ignored physical distancing guidelines to stand six feet apart and to cover their noses and mouths. SHFA organized another rally at the State House in June, which was intended to show support to law enforcement and opposition to Black Lives Matter.

On November 7, 2021, SHFA organized a rally at the Boston Common to show their opposition to "vaccine passports, unconstitutional mandates, and massive layoffs". They were met with a larger counterprotest, and the events were met with heavy presence of police in riot gear. A person driving a van rented by SHFA drove through police barricades during the event. No one was hit, and police subsequently apprehended the driver. Due to safety concerns, police ended the event early.

== See also ==
- Unite the Right rally
