= Alt-lite =

American right-wing political movement

The alt-lite, also known as the alt-light and the new right, is a loosely defined right-wing political movement whose members regard themselves as separate from both mainstream conservatism, the far-right, and the white nationalist alt-right. The concept is primarily associated with the United States, where it emerged in 2017. The term remained in vogue during the first Trump administration.

According to extremism scholar George Hawley, alt-lite was coined by white nationalists as a pejorative term in an attempt to exclude more moderate figures from the alt-right. The term alt-right had previously included "anyone that fell on the right of the political spectrum but had major problems with the conservative movement", including populists and libertarians. After the term alt-right was successfully reclaimed by white nationalists, previous adherents abandoned the term and started calling themselves populists or civic nationalists.

== History ==
The term alternative right was coined by Paul Gottfried but was later adopted by Richard B. Spencer who sought to use it to promote white nationalist ideas across the political right in the United States; however, there remained differing views on the term; some understood it as an umbrella term for a broad range of rightists outside the neoconservatism then dominant in the U.S. conservative movement, including paleoconservatives, libertarians, localists, and right-wing populists, as well as white nationalists. By 2010, many of the non-white-nationalist rightists who used the term distanced themselves from it after it became increasingly apparent that Spencer intended the term as a banner of white nationalism. In 2016, as the term became popularised in U.S. public discourse, it again came to be used by many people who were not white nationalists but who saw it as a useful term to refer to rightists outside the mainstream conservative movement.

Some have traced the recognition of the alt-lite—as a distinct entity from the alt-right—to what is seen as the consolidation of the alt-right as a white nationalist movement, while the alt-lite is more culturally nationalist. In a speech given to a meeting of white nationalists in November 2016, Spencer (who is often credited with creating or popularizing the term alt-right) quoted Nazi propaganda and declared "Hail Trump, hail our people, hail victory!" while members of the audience responded to this by giving Hitler salutes.

Subsequently, various figures who had been linked to the alt-right distanced themselves from Spencer's remarks, and suggested that two factions had emerged from the alt-right. This was the result of a rift within the wider alt-right movement, between those favoring white nationalism and more moderate forces. Some of the latter group adopted the term Third New Right" (as a follow-on to the earlier Second New Right) to describe themselves, with Mike Cernovich saying of the division that "the lines are drawn and the fracture is more or less complete". The term alt-lite is thought by the Anti-Defamation League (ADL) to have been created by members of the alt-right to distinguish themselves from right-wing groups and ideologies who support white supremacy and white nationalism. According to the ADL, there is crossover and line-toeing between the alt-right and alt-lite groupings, making it difficult or impossible to tell which side of the theoretical line they belong on. This ambiguity contributes to the alt-right pipeline, in which supporters of the alt-lite become acclimated to the alt-right.

Historian Joshua Tait argued that the alt-lite "found the most mainstream success. These figures in the alt-lite entered the mainstream by alternating between courting and rejecting the more explicitly racist elements of the alt-right, massively expanding the movement's reach and ultimately placing it inside the White House."

=== Etymology ===
The division between alt-right and alt-lite received further media attention in June 2017 when the two factions found themselves divided over the issue of Spencer's attendance at a Free Speech rally in Washington, D.C. Certain individuals protested Spencer's involvement by organizing a competing rally on the same day, with Spencer referring to such individuals as "alt-lite" and saying that "the movement needs a good purge". The Unite the Right rally in 2017 exacerbated tensions between the white nationalist alt-right, who supported and attended the rally, and the alt-lite, who did not and expressed disdain for it. Breitbart News distanced itself from the alt-right and criticized other media outlets that described them in such a manner, as did Milo Yiannopoulos, who insisted he had "nothing in common" with Spencer.

Academic Angela Nagle described the alt-lite as "the youthful bridge between the alt-right and mainstream Trumpism". She was of the view that it was the alt-lite, and not the alt-right, which had successfully utilised the Nouvelle Droite's ideas about promoting cultural change as a prerequisite for long-term political change. Nagle characterized Cernovich as a "major figure in the alt-lite milieu". She also characterized Alex Jones as being part of it.

== Beliefs ==
People associated with the alt-lite have distanced themselves from the ethnic nationalism of the alt-right. As with the alt-right, the alt-lite commonly shows broad support for Donald Trump, cultural nationalism, and non-interventionism. Many in the alt-lite criticize or oppose political correctness, Islam, feminism (sometimes restricted to the fourth wave), LGBT rights, welfare, and illegal immigration. It has been described as a "misogynistic" and "xenophobic" movement by the Anti-Defamation League. Alt-right figures have described Breitbart News and Steve Bannon as "alt-lite" for presenting a diluted form of alt-right ideas. Wired has referred to the alt-lite as "the alt-right's relatively mild-mannered sibling".

== Proponents ==
The Anti-Defamation League has published a list of people whom it calls alt-lite, consisting of writer and podcast host Brittany Pettibone, 2018 Senate Republican candidate from Virginia Corey Stewart, Proud Boys and Vice founder Gavin McInnes, English YouTuber Paul Joseph Watson, conspiracy theorist Jack Posobiec, right-wing activist Kyle Chapman, conservative White House correspondent Lucian Wintrich, radio personality Mike Cernovich, and media provocateur Milo Yiannopoulos.
