= List of killings by law enforcement officers in the United States, September 2020 =

This is a list of people reported killed by non-military law enforcement officers in the United States in September 2020, whether in the line of duty or not, and regardless of reason or method. The listing documents the occurrence of a death, making no implications regarding wrongdoing or justification on the part of the person killed or officer involved. Killings are arranged by date of the incident that caused death. Different death dates, if known, are noted in the description. The table below lists 66 people.

== September 2020 ==
Date	Name (age) of deceased	Race	State (city)	Description
2020-09-30	Jarred Kemp (41)	White	Manhattan, KS	
2020-09-30	DeMarco Riley (27)	Black	Decatur, GA	
2020-09-29	Kirby Joseph Michael Hengel (27)	Unknown race	St. Cloud, MN	
2020-09-28	Willie Shropshire Jr. (57)	Black	Waggaman, LA	
2020-09-28	Jakob Osuna (18)	Hispanic	Victorville, CA	
2020-09-27	James Lucachevitz (43)	White	Dearborn, MI	
2020-09-27	Eloy Mares Gonzalez Jr	Hispanic	Modesto, CA	
2020-09-25	Angel Benitez (21)	Latino	Arizona (Tempe)	Officers attempted to pull over Benitez, who was driving a stolen car. Eventually, officers shot and killed Benitez at a parking lot. Two witnesses say Benitez had his arms up when he was shot.
2020-09-24	Randy Fedorchuk	Unknown race	La Quinta, CA	
2020-09-24	Erik "Ace" Mahoney (43)	White	Spokane, WA	
2020-09-24	Kirby Paradise	Native American	Fort McDermitt, Nevada	An agent with the Bureau of Indian Affairs shot and killed Paradise as he held a BB gun to his head. Despite federal requirements, the BIA never officially reported Paradise's death.
2020-09-24	Matthew Nocerino (30)	White	Sebring, FL	
2020-09-24	Christopher Michael Straub (38)	White	Paso Robles, CA	
2020-09-24	Jessie A. Hudnall (29)	Unknown race	Whitehall, LA	
2020-09-23	Kurt Reinhold (42)	African American	California (San Clemente)	Members of San Clemente's homeless outreach team contacted Reinhold outside of Hotel Miramar. Shortly after, a physical altercation occurred, and one of the officers shot Reinhold after he allegedly attempted to grab the officer's weapon. Protests were held in response to the shooting.
2020-09-22	Victor Sanchez (44)	Hispanic	San Antonio, TX	
2020-09-22	Christine Harris (57)	Black	Fayetteville, NC	
2020-09-22	Jeffrey Blunk (30)	Caucasian/White	Illinois (Geneseo)	Prior to his death, Blunk was stopped by officers early in the morning on County Route 5, but he fled shortly after. Officers attempted to stop his vehicle and became wedged underneath his truck and was dragged before both cars stopped and Blunk opened fire on officers and ran from the scene. He was discovered six hours later by officers, which resulted in a ninety-minute standoff and Blunk being shot and killed by police.
2020-09-21	Patches Holmes (26)	Black	Missouri (St. Louis County)	Holmes was a wanted suspect due to parole violations and was spotted in a vehicle by officers. The vehicle did not stop, until officers used spike strips, which caused the vehicle to come to a stop and three individuals ran from the car. Holmes was discovered underneath a back porch and reportedly pointed a gun at officers who opened fire on him. He later died at the hospital.
2020-09-21	Julia Anne Moss (40)	Unknown race	Athens, GA	
2020-09-21	Name Withheld	Hispanic	Nogales, AZ	
2020-09-21	Dearian Bell (28)	African American	Georgia (Atlanta)	Police attempted to detain a man who had been suspect in a domestic violence call. He jumped into his car, and refused to get out, but did not drive off. He then ran out and police attempted to tase him. He got behind some trees and started moving erratically. He then dove into a bush and pointed a gun at officers. An officer fired a single shot at him, which struck him in the chest. He was pronounced dead soon after, while in the hospital.
2020-09-20	Andrea Churna (39)	White	Redmond, WA	
2020-09-19	Joshua Sarrett (32)	White	Auburn, WA	
2020-09-19	Derek Cooper (52)	Black	Talking Rock, GA	
2020-09-19	Charles Eric Moses Jr. (33)	Black	Brunswick, GA	
2020-09-18	Scott Heisler (45)	Caucasian/White	Iowa (Des Moines)	Officers responded to the home of Heisler after he reportedly violated a no-contact order to arrest him. He went back inside his home when officers arrived, grabbed a gun and threatened officers who opened fire. Heisler's family believe his actions were suicide-by-cop, as he had been struggling with alcoholism, mental health and had threatened suicide several times. Family members also state he had sent them all similar text messages prior, stating he loved them and goodbye.
2020-09-18	Matthew C. Knowlden (22)	White	Midvale, UT	
2020-09-18	Thien Nguyen (26)	Asian	Stanton, CA	
2020-09-18	Matthew Lyvon Paul (46)	White	Lakewood, CO	
2020-09-18	Name Withheld (39)	Unknown race	Redlands, CA	
2020-09-18	Rickey Wayne Riney (41)	White	West Odessa, TX	
2020-09-17	Nicholas Morales-Bessannia (37)	Native American	Immokalee, FL	
2020-09-16	Name Withheld	White	Denver, CO	
2020-09-15	Clay Reynolds (27)	Caucasian/White	Utah (Bountiful)	Officers received phone calls about an armed man outside of the Viewmont High School late at night. Upon arrival they saw Reynolds holding a rifle and a bow and arrow at the school, and he was shot and killed during the confrontation with police.
2020-09-15	Darrell Zemault Sr (55)	African American	Texas (San Antonio)	The 55 year old man was shot dead had two family violence warrants, and also stabbed a woman 22 times in 2006, however the woman survived. According to officers, he was shot by a single bullet after pointing a gun at officers. The gun, which he had attempted to take out of the holster while wrestling with an officer was not discharged on the officer. He reportedly had domestic issues with his ex-girlfriend and allegedly stalked and harassed her.
2020-09-13	Ricardo Munoz (27)	Hispanic/Latino	Pennsylvania (Lancaster)	Munoz was shot after running out of a building armed with a knife. He was shot after running towards the Officers. This occurred in Lancaster Pennsylvania. Protests were sparked after footage of the shooting was released from body cameras. According to the Lancaster Police Department, he had previously been arrested for stabbing 4 people, including a juvenile, after a dispute, inside of a store. None of those victims were killed in the 2019 attack.
2020-09-13	Nichole Clayborne (35)	Black	Memphis, TN	
2020-09-12	Christopher Escobedo (33)	Hispanic	Denver, CO	
2020-09-12	Robert Coleman (88)	Black	West Sacramento, CA	
2020-09-11	Joshua Clayton Brant (31)	Unknown race	Spokane Valley, WA	
2020-09-10	Antonio Black Bear (41)	Native American	Colorado (Denver)	Black Bear was shot and killed by responding officers near West High School, where he was brandishing a modified Airsoft gun at individuals in a parked car and making threats. Responding officers drew his attention where he pointed the Airsoft gun made to look like a functioning Glock 17 handgun, at officers and disregarded their commands and began to walk towards them. Officers opened fire at Black Bear who died at a local hospital.
2020-09-10	Jonathan Darsaw (49)	African American	Tennessee (Fayette County)	Officers attempted to arrest Darsaw at his home after reports of a hostage situation where he was holding a woman hostage and had shot her multiple times. The victim was released and Darsaw barricaded himself in the home, before stepping out onto his back porch. Officers used tasers initially, during which an officer was wounded and SWAT was called for assistance. During the SWAT team entrance into the home, there was a confrontation with Darsaw who was killed by the police team.
2020-09-10	Samuel Herrera Jr. (41)	Hispanic	Compton, CA	
2020-09-10	Robert Samuel Craig Lusk	Unknown race	Norcross, GA	
2020-09-10	Robert Ray Doss Jr.	White	Mountain Home, NC	
2020-09-10	Glenn "G" Alvin Eldridge (48)	White	Fayetteville, NC	
2020-09-09	Chad Busby (47)	White	Paducah, KY	
2020-09-09	Matthew Patton	Unknown race	Las Vegas, NV	
2020-09-08	Steve Gilbert (33)	Black	Delray Beach, FL	
2020-09-07	Jeffrey Meyer (51)	White	Altoona, IA	
2020-09-06	Verlon Billy Stiles (54)	Unknown race	Spruce Pine, NC	
2020-09-06	Refugio Reynaldo Olivo	Hispanic	Virginia Beach, VA	
2020-09-06	Seth Holliday (40)	White	Summerlin, NV	
2020-09-05	Major Carvel Baldwin (61)	Black	San Antonio, TX	
2020-09-05	Andrew Blowers (22)	White	Battle Creek, MI	
2020-09-05	Jose "Guero" Pulido (51)	Hispanic	Fresno, CA	
2020-09-05	Shaon Jermy Ochea Warner (34)	African American	Illinois (Chicago)	Police were called for a disturbance at Vittum park. They found Shaon Warner hiding in the bushes. They asked him to come out, to which he walked out after multiple orders by police for him to do so. He then walked a past officers while carrying a bag. He was then tased. Then, while on is knees, he wielded a knife, and then proceeded to charge an Officer. He chased on officer, and stabbed her in her vest, while he still had the taser hooks in his body. He grabbed hold of her, and he was shot around 15 times.
2020-09-04	Joshua Beedie (38)	White	Lucerne Valley, CA	
2020-09-04	Steven D. Smith (33)	Black	Syracuse, NY	
2020-09-03	Timothy Clevenger (53)	White	Bettendorf, IA	
2020-09-03	Fernando Napoles (37)	Hispanic	Bakersfield, CA	
2020-09-03	Douglas Diamond (58)	White	Welches, OR	
2020-09-03	Michael Forest Reinoehl (48)	Caucasian/White	Washington (Lacey)	Reinoehl was a murder suspect in the death of pro-Trump protester Aaron "Jay" Danielson in Portland. When authorities attempted to arrest him he initiated a gunfire and was shot. Reinoehl was a self-proclaimed supporter of ANTIFA, and had made public statements confirming his role in Danielson's killing, though he claimed he was defending a friend.
2020-09-02	Deon Kay (18)	African American	Washington, D.C.	According to police, Kay and another man fled when approached by officers who were responding to reports of a man with a gun in the area. Police say Kay brandished a gun, at which point he was shot. Protests were held in response to the shooting.
2020-09-01	Albert Wheeler (50)	White	Sacramento, CA	

== See also ==
- Death in custody § United States
- Henry A. Wallace Police Crime Public Database
- List of cases of police brutality
- List of countries with annual rates and counts for killings by law enforcement officers
- List of law enforcement officers killed in the line of duty in the United States
- List of law enforcement officers convicted for an on-duty killing in the United States
- List of shootings by US immigration agents
- List of police reforms related to the George Floyd protests
- List of unarmed African Americans killed by law enforcement officers in the United States
- Lists of killings by law enforcement officers
- Police brutality in the United States
- Police misconduct § United States
- Police riot § United States
- Police use of deadly force in the United States
