= List of people killed during the 2020–23 United States racial unrest =

At least 42 people have been killed in relation to the 2020–2023 United States racial unrest following the murder of George Floyd on May 25, 2020, among other racially based controversies in the following years. Notable fatal events include the California Boogaloo murders, shootings in the Capitol Hill Autonomous Zone, the shooting of Garrett Foster, the Kyle Rittenhouse shootings, the shootings of Aaron Jay Danielson and Michael Reinoehl, and Tortuguita shooting.

== List ==
Indicates the person was killed by law enforcement officers

Name	Date	Location	Perpetrator(s)	Circumstance	Source
Calvin Horton Jr.	May 27, 2020	Minneapolis, Minnesota	John Rieple	A looter was shot and killed by the owner of the store he was looting.	
Oscar Lee Stewart Jr.	May 28, 2020	Minneapolis, Minnesota	Montez Terrill Lee (started the fire that killed Stewart)	Stewart died in a fire started by Montez Terrill Lee during a looting at a Minneapolis pawnshop.	
Javar Harrell	May 29, 2020	Detroit, Michigan	Tyjon Hites, Omono Bryant	Harrell was killed after a man opened fire on a protest in Detroit.	
David Patrick Underwood	May 29, 2020	Oakland, California	Steven Carrillo	Boogaloo movement members ambush security personnel outside a federal building in Oakland, CA	
Barry Perkins	May 30, 2020	St. Louis, Missouri	Unnamed FedEx truck driver	A man attempting to loot a FedEx truck was pulled underneath the vehicle and dragged, resulting in his death.	
James Scurlock	May 30, 2020	Omaha, Nebraska	Jacob Gardner	After protesters began vandalizing nearby buildings, Jacob Gardner and his father approached them, in which a physical brawl erupted. During the scuffle, Jacob withdrew his pistol and fired two shots, killing James Scurlock. Jacob committed suicide after he was required to turn himself into police.	
Marvin Francois	May 31, 2020	Kansas City, Missouri	Unknown	Francois was shot and killed by apparent robbers in his car while attempting to pick up his sons from the protest.	
John Tiggs	May 31, 2020	Chicago, Illinois	Unknown	Tiggs, walking into a store, was shot and killed by nearby gunfire	
Chris Beaty	May 31, 2020	Indianapolis, Indiana	Unclear	Beaty was killed by armed robbers during the civil unrest in Indianapolis.	
Dorian Murrell	May 31, 2020	Indianapolis, Indiana	Tyler Newby	Tyler Newby was shoved to the ground by Murrell, which led him to withdraw his firearm and shoot Tyler in the heart, killing him. Newby later turned himself into authorities.	
David McAtee	June 1, 2020	Louisville, Kentucky	Katie Crews, Austin Allen, Andrew Kroszkewicz, Matthew Roark	After raising his firearm during a scuffle at a protest, David McAtee was shot by law enforcement and National Guard.	
Italia Marie Kelly	June 1, 2020	Davenport, Iowa	Parker Marlin Belz	Attempting to depart from the protest, Kelly was shot and killed while approaching her car in a Walmart parking lot.	
Marquis M. Tousant	June 1, 2020	Davenport, Iowa	Davenport Police Department	Tousant was killed by Davenport Police Officers while attempting to ambush them.	
Jose Gutierrez	June 1, 2020	Cicero, Illinois	Zion Haygood	Jose Gutierrez was shot and killed by a nearby looter from Chicago.	
Victor Cazares Jr.	June 1, 2020	Cicero, Illinois	Unknown	Cazares was struck by a stray bullet during the unrest in Cicero.	
Jorge Gomez	June 1, 2020	Las Vegas, Nevada	Ryan Fryman, Andrew Locher, Vernon Ferguson, Daniel Emerton	Unprovoked, four officers opened fire on protester Jorge Gomez as he was walking towards his car.	
Unnamed	June 2, 2020	Philadelphia, Pennsylvania	Owner of gun shop	A gun shop owner opened fire on looters, killing one.	
Unnamed	June 2, 2020	Philadelphia, Pennsylvania	None (killed by own explosive)	A looter was killed attempting to use an explosive to gain entry into an ATM.	
David Dorn	June 2, 2020	St. Louis, Missouri	Stephen Cannon	A 77 year old retired law enforcement officer was shot by looters during the unrest.	
Sean Monterrosa	June 2, 2020	Vallejo, California	Jarrett Tonn	A protester, who was kneeling with his hands in the air, was shot by a police officer who mistook a hammer in his pocket for a firearm.	
Robert Forbes	June 3, 2020	Bakersfield, California	Timothy Kieth Moore	A protester was struck and killed by a motorist, who also later died in Mexico.	
Scott Hutton	June 3, 2020	Alexander, Arkansas	Calvin Salyers	Hutton, who was at Salyers's residence to retrieve a police vehicle, was holding his firearm due to recent anti-police sentiment. Salyers, seeing through the peephole that Hutton had his weapon drawn also withdrew his firearm. When Salyers moved his gun from one hand to the other in order to reach for the door handle, he accidentally discharged the weapon, in which the round penetrated the door and struck Hutton. Both Hutton and Salyers knew each other and the death was an accident.	
Damon Gutzwiller	June 6, 2020	Ben Lomond, California	Steven Carrillo	Following Carrillo's earlier attack in May, Santa Cruz Sheriff deputies arrived at Carrillo's home, and were met by gunfire, in which Gutzwiller was killed	
Horace Lorenzo Anderson Jr.	June 20, 2020	Seattle, Washington	Marcel Long	A shooting in the CHOP resulted in the death of one person. First responders were unable to immediately tend to the victims due to a lack of available security.	
Unnamed	June 27, 2020	Louisville, Kentucky	Unnamed	A person was arrested after shooting at Breonna Taylor protesters	
Antonio Mays	June 29, 2020	Seattle, Washington	Unknown	Mays was one of the two people in a white van (allegedly stolen) that drove into the occupied protest, and was hit by gunfire from protest security who were responding to a possible active shooter. He was treated by protest medics, but died en route to paramedics while further treatment was delayed in the confusion. As of 2025, the exact circumstances were still unknown.	
Summer Taylor	July 4, 2020	Seattle, Washington	Dawit Kelete	Taylor was struck by a vehicle driving through a protest on a highway, resulting in their death.	
Secoriea Turner	July 4, 2020	Atlanta, Georgia	Julian Conley and Jerrion McKinney	After attempting to drive through a protest to enter a parking lot, Secoriea Turner, an eight-year-old passenger, was struck by gunfire from the crowd.	
Jessica Doty Whitaker	July 5, 2020	Indianapolis, Indiana	Unknown	A woman was shot and killed after telling protesters "All Lives Matter".	
Garrett Foster	July 25, 2020	Austin, Texas	Daniel Perry	Garrett Foster, a protester armed with an AK47, approached a vehicle that erratically drove through the protest and was fatally met by gunfire by driver Daniel Perry.	
Joseph Rosenbaum	August 25, 2020	Kenosha, Wisconsin	Kyle Rittenhouse	During a chase, Rosenbaum lunged towards Rittenhouse and attempted to grab his barrel, which resulted in Rosenbaum being shot in the head and killed.	
Anthony Huber	August 25, 2020	Kenosha, Wisconsin	Kyle Rittenhouse	During a second chase, Rittenhouse fell and was struck in the neck by Anthony Huber with a skateboard, causing him to open fire and kill Huber.	
Aaron Danielson	August 29, 2020	Portland, Oregon	Michael Reinoehl	A Patriot Prayer member was shot and killed in an ambush by Antifa activist Michael Reinoehl in Portland. Earlier that day, Patriot Prayer and Antifa engaged in a street battle.	
Michael Reinoehl	September 3, 2020	Lacey, Washington	4 Federal Bureau of Investigation and United States Marshals Service agents	In the days following Reinoehl's attack in Portland, Oregon, President Trump ordered a task force to locate and neutralize Reinoehl, which would culminate in his death during a standoff on September 3.	
Eric Allport	October 2, 2020	Madison Heights, Michigan	Multiple FBI agents	During the execution of an arrest warrant for Eric Allport, a member of the Boogaloo movement in which anarchists engaged in political violence earlier in the year, engaged in a shootout with FBI in which one agent was injured and Allport himself was killed.	
Lee Kelter	October 10, 2020	Denver, Colorado	Matthew Dolloff	A security guard for a news team opened fire on a right-wing militant after being assaulted with mace.	
Travis Nagdy	November 23, 2020	Louisville, Kentucky	Unnamed	A Black Lives Matter activist died in a carjacking during the protests.	
Deona Marie Knajdek	June 13, 2021	Minneapolis, Minnesota	Nicholas Kraus	Protester Deona Marie Knajdek died after being struck by an erratic driver plowing into the protest.	
Brandy Knightly	February 19, 2022	Portland, Oregon	Benjamin Jeffrey Smith	A man approached a demonstration at Normandale Park and opened fire, killing two, including one which died from injuries in 2024, and injuring multiple more.	
Deg	July 2, 2024	Portland, Oregon	Benjamin Jeffrey Smith	A man approached a demonstration at Normandale Park and opened fire, killing two, including one which died from injuries in 2024, and injuring multiple more.	
Manuel Esteban Paez Terán (Tortuguita)	January 18, 2023	Cop City, South River Forest, Georgia	Bryland Myers, Jerry Parrish, Jonathan Salcedo, Mark Jonathan Lamb, Ronaldo Kegel, Royce Zah	When police attempted to clear a tent encampment at the Stop Cop City demonstrations, a shootout erupted between activist Tortuguita and Georgia State Troopers, resulting in the death of Tortuguita.	
