= United States racial unrest (2020–2023) =

Civil unrest following the murder of George Floyd

- Part of racism in the United States, protests against Donald Trump and political violence in the United States
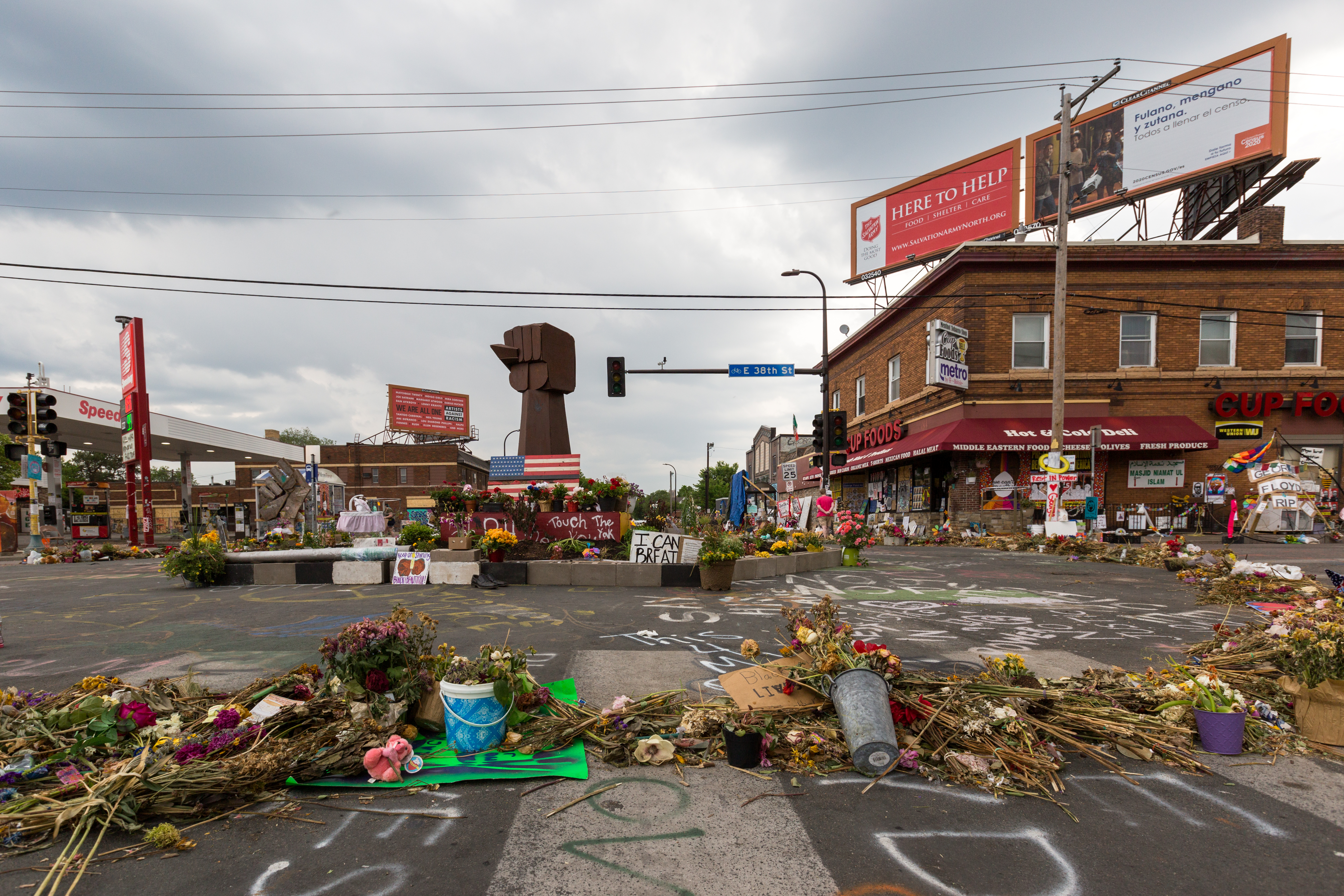
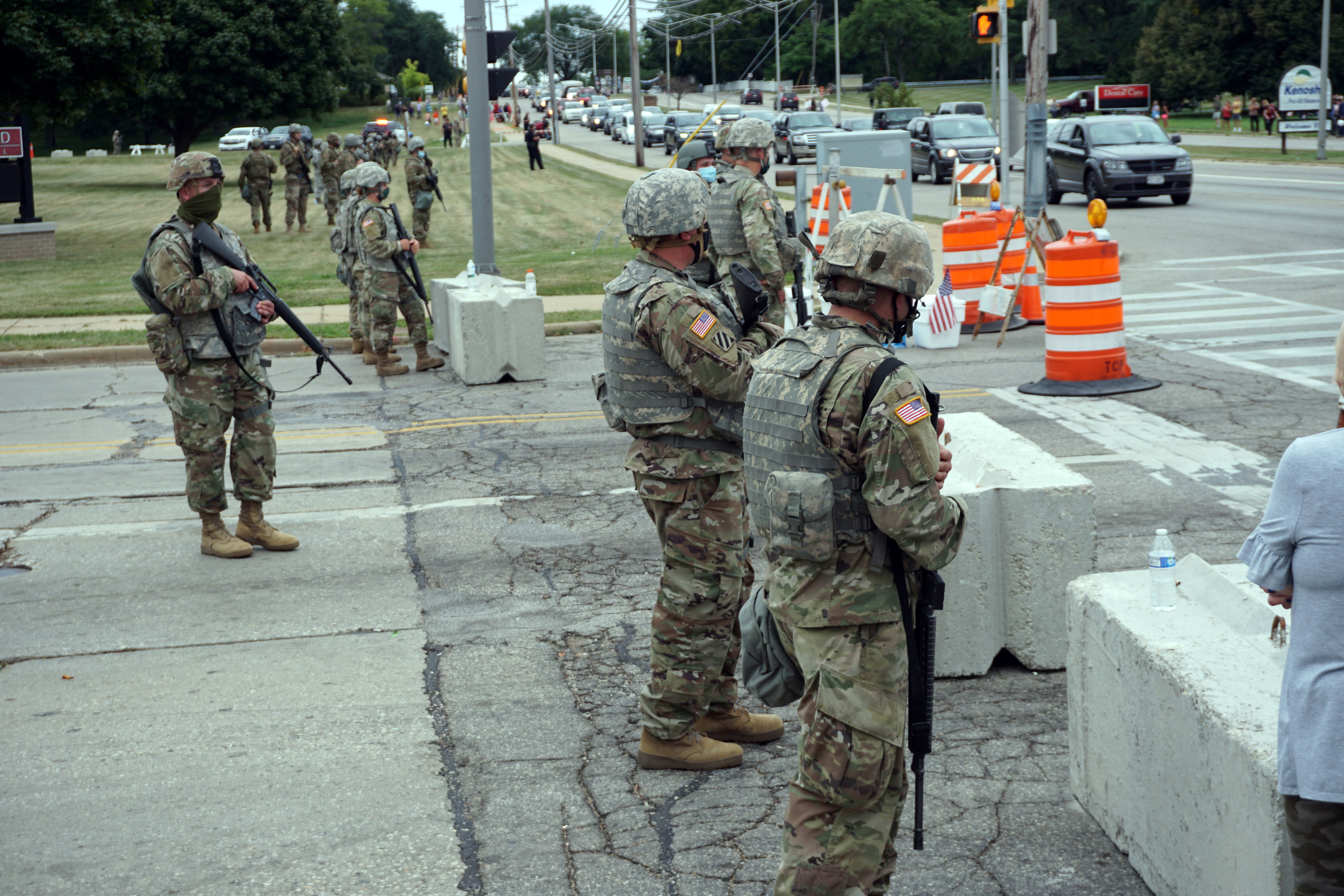
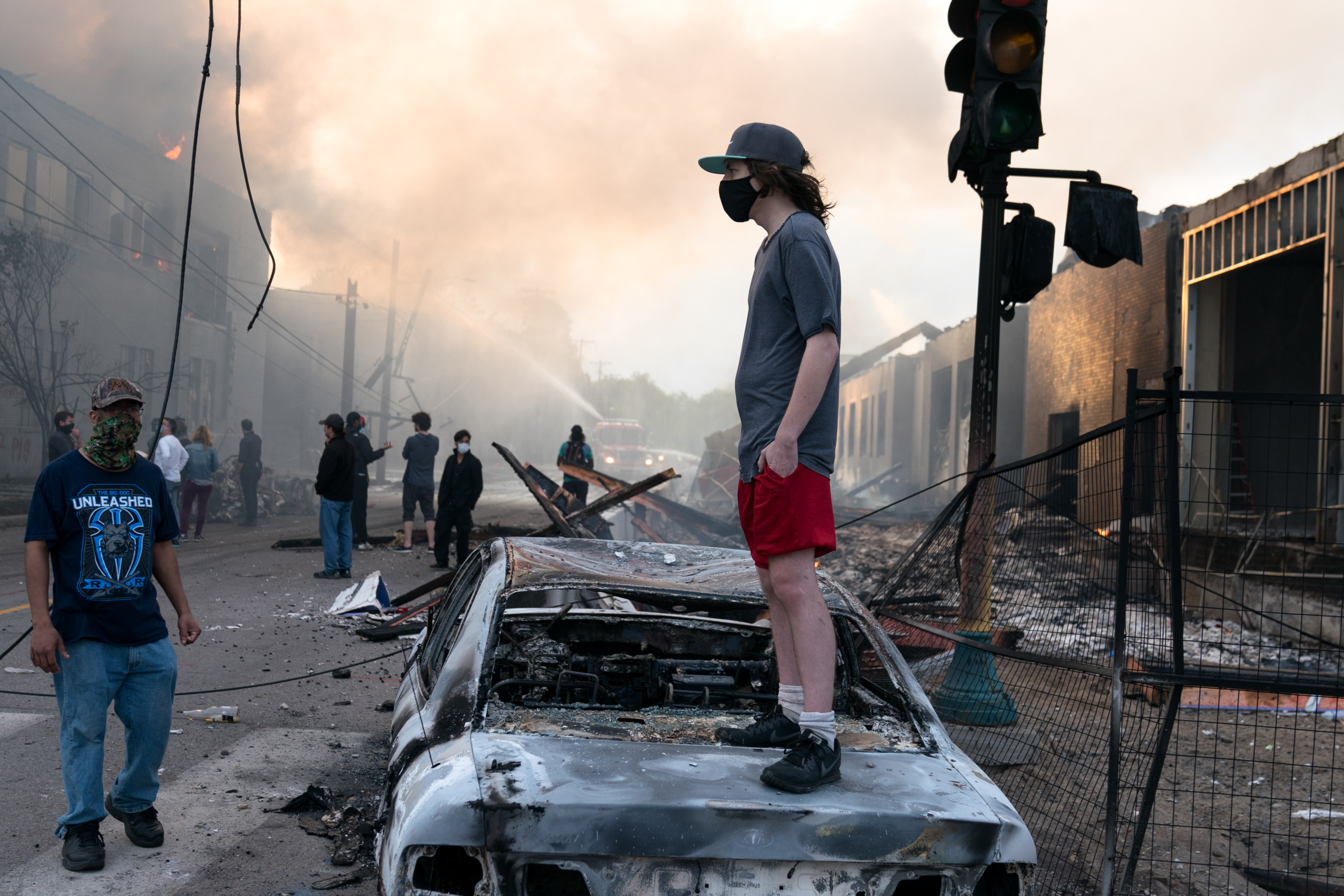
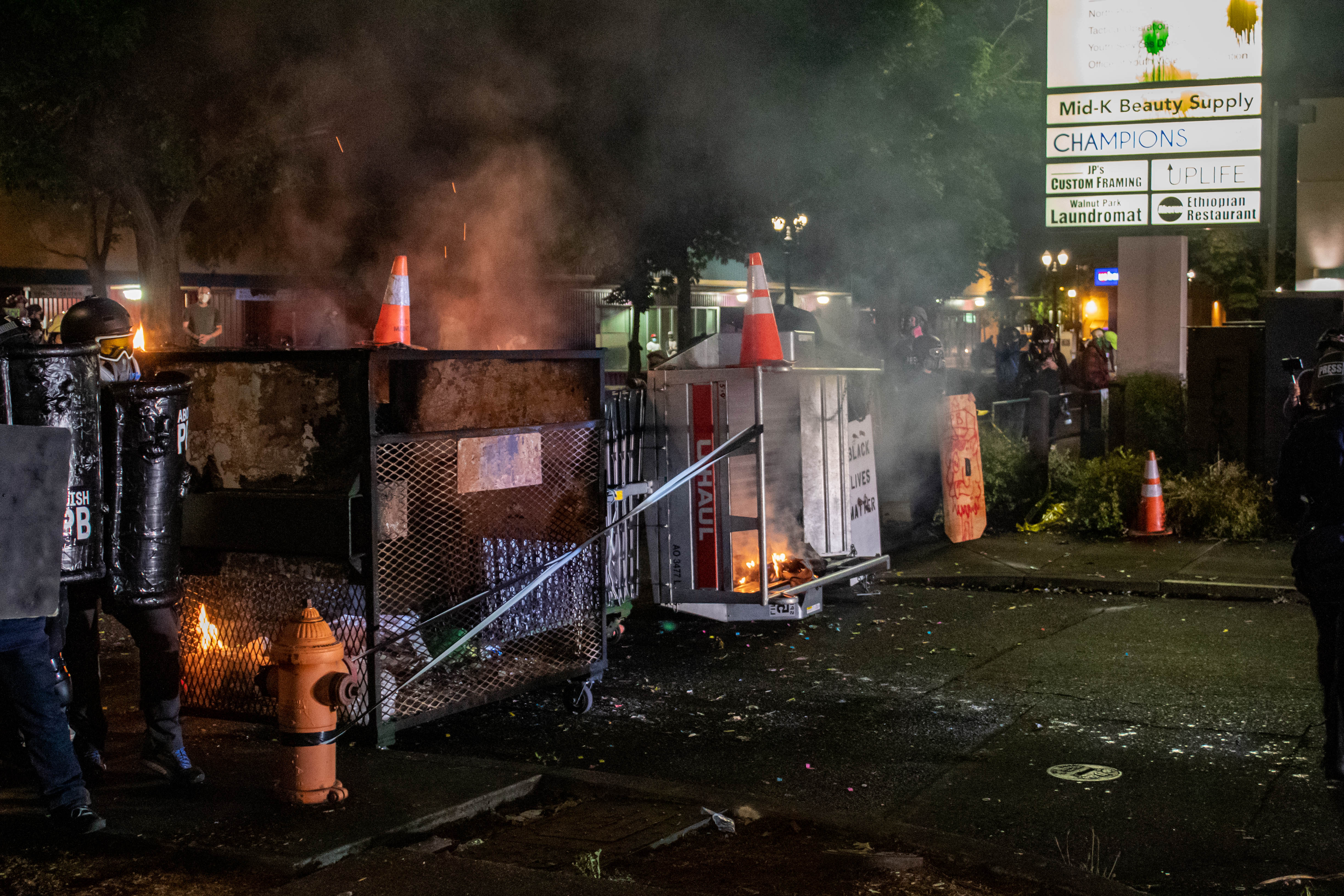
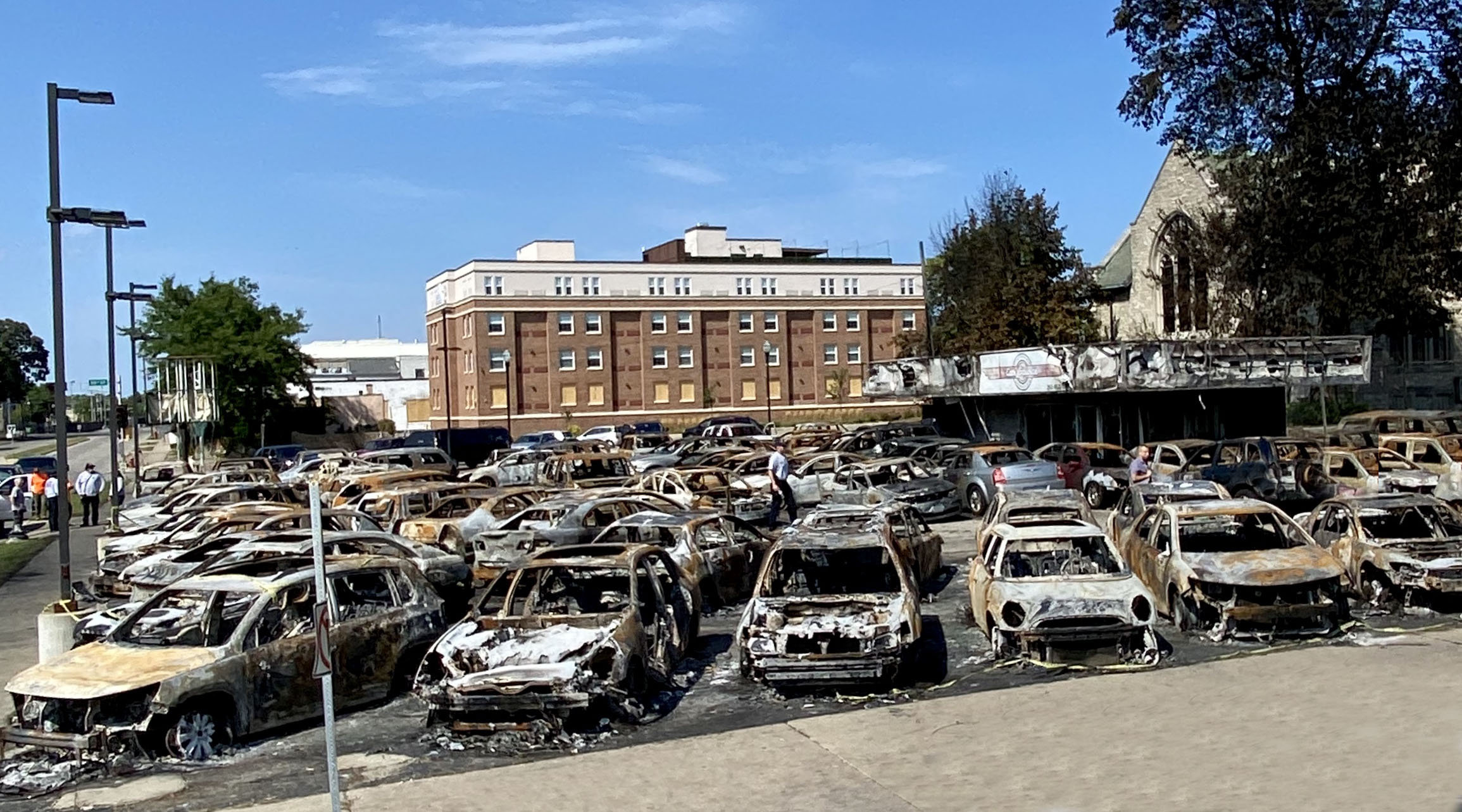
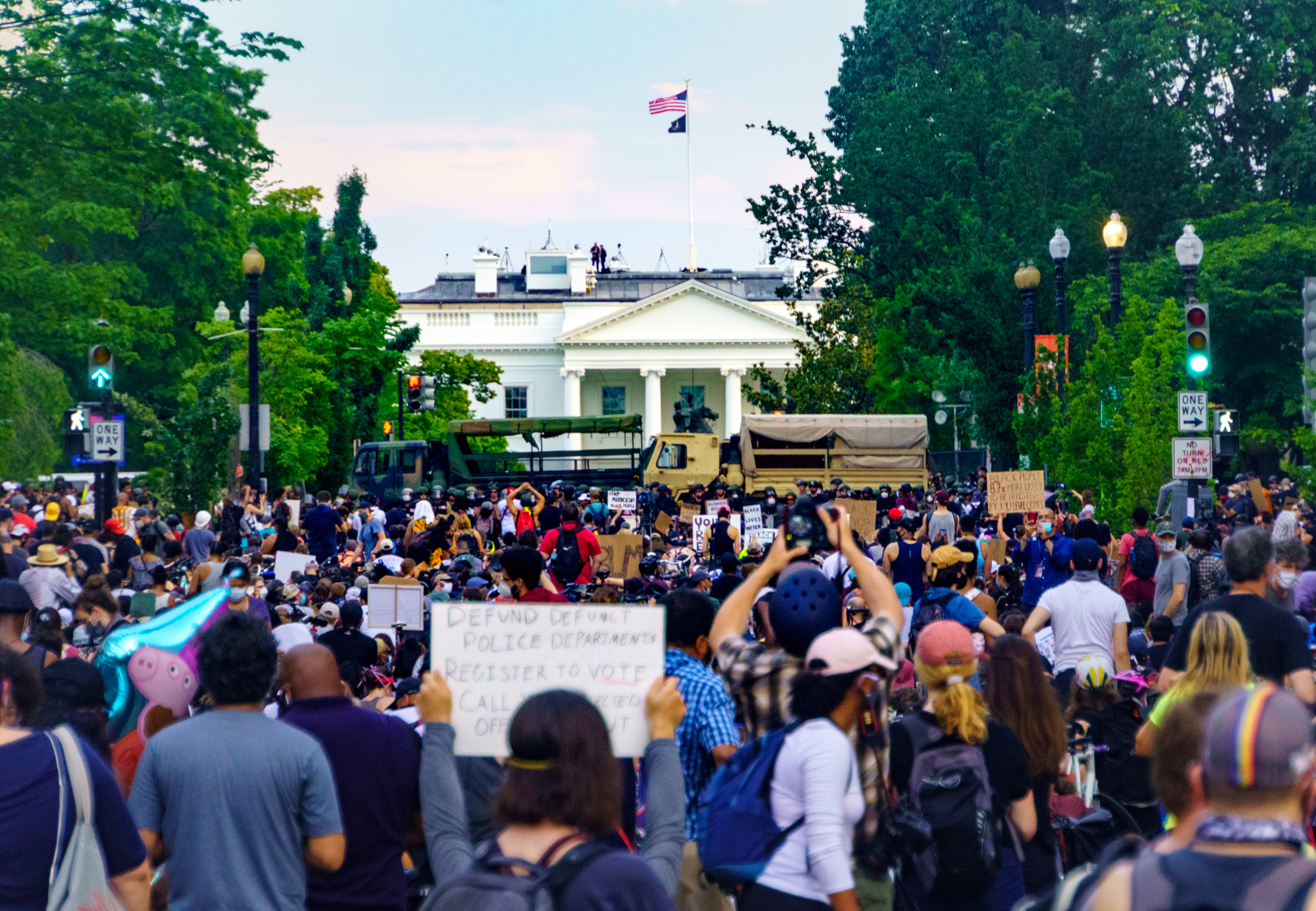
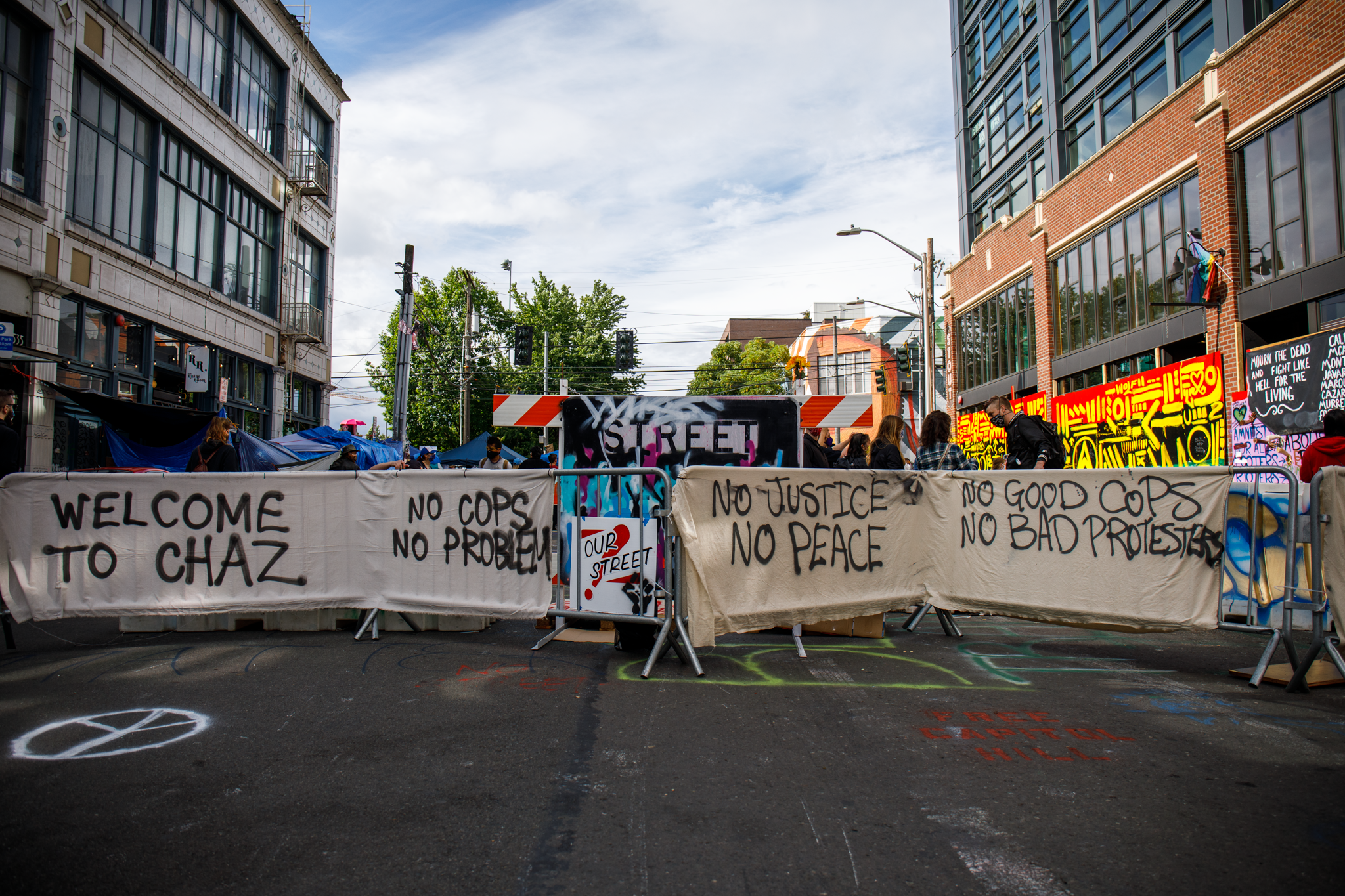
- Clockwise from top: George Floyd Square in Minneapolis, Minnesota; bystanders observe property damage in Minneapolis, where the unrest began; a torched car dealership in Kenosha, Wisconsin; the self-declared Capitol Hill Autonomous Zone; protesters and FMTV military trucks in front of the White House; protesters with shields and hastily-made barricades advance on the Portland police; US National Guard troops behind concrete barricades in Kenosha
- Date: May 26, 2020 – September 26, 2023 (3 years and 4 months)
- Location: United States
- Caused by: Killings of African-American people by police (including the murder of George Floyd); police brutality; lack of police accountability; racial inequality and racism
- Methods: Protests; demonstrations; civil disobedience; civil resistance; strike action; riots
- Result: Police chiefs in 16 major cities vacated their positions in 2020; Federal forces began to be deployed in June 2020; Operation Legend from July 2020 to January 2021; Derek Chauvin found guilty on all charges in April 2021
- Concessions: Budget cuts and reforms for several police departments

Parties
Black Lives Matter movement: Civil rights groups; Various left-wing groups; Unaffiliated protesters; Capital Hill Organized Protest	Blue Lives Matter movement: Boogaloo movement; Proud Boys; Right-wing militias; Unaffiliated counterprotesters	United States federal government: Various state and local governments; Law enforcement agencies; United States Armed Forces

Casualties
- Deaths: 42 confirmed (May 26 – January 18, 2023), see list
- Injuries: 2,000+ law enforcement officials and an unknown number of civilians (as of July 31, 2020)
- Arrested: Over 14,000 (as of June 27, 2020)
- Property damage: $1–2 billion (May 26 – June 8, 2020)

The murder of George Floyd during his arrest by Minneapolis police officers on May 25, 2020, triggered protests and riots against systemic racism in the United States, including police brutality and other forms of violence. Since the initial national wave and peak towards the end of 2020, other incidents of police violence have drawn continued attention and lower intensity unrest in various parts of the country.

It was facilitated by the nationwide Black Lives Matter movement. Following the murder of Floyd, unrest broke out in the Minneapolis–Saint Paul area on May 26, and quickly spread across the country and the world. Polls conducted in June 2020 estimated that between 15 million and 26 million people participated in the demonstrations in the United States, making them the largest protests in American history. It was also estimated that between May 26 and August 22, around 93 percent of protests were peaceful and nondestructive. According to several studies and analyses, the majority of protests were peaceful.

The unrest precipitated a national American cultural reckoning on topics of racial injustice. Public opinion of racism and discrimination quickly shifted in the wake of the protests, with significantly increased support of the Black Lives Matter movement and acknowledgement of institutional racism. The effects of American activism extended internationally, and multiple columnists began to refer to it as an international reckoning on racial issues in early June 2020.

Within Minneapolis, widespread property destruction and looting occurred, including a police station being overrun by demonstrators and set on fire, causing the Minnesota National Guard to be activated and deployed on May 28. After a week of unrest, over $500 million in property damage was reported in the Minneapolis–Saint Paul area, with two deaths linked to the riots. Further unrest quickly spread throughout the United States, sometimes including rioting, looting, and arson. By early June, at least 200 American cities had imposed curfews, while more than 30 states and Washington, D.C., had activated over 62,000 National Guard personnel in response to unrest. By the end of June, at least 14,000 people had been arrested at protests. By June 2020, more than 19 people had died in relation to the unrest. According to a September 2020 estimate, arson, vandalism and looting caused about $1–2 billion in insured damage between May 26 and June 8, making this initial phase of the George Floyd protests the civil disorder event with the highest recorded damage in American history.

There was also a large concentration of unrest around Portland, Oregon, which led to the Department of Homeland Security deploying federal agents in the city in June 2020. The move was code named Operation Legend, after four-year-old LeGend Taliferro, who was shot and killed in Kansas City. Federal forces were later deployed in other cities which faced unrest, including Kansas City and Seattle. More localized unrest reemerged in several cities following incidents involving police officers, notably following the shooting of Jacob Blake in Kenosha, Wisconsin, which led to protests and riots in the city. The protests led to requests at the federal, state and municipal levels intended to combat police misconduct, systemic racism, qualified immunity and police brutality in the United States.

== Background ==
=== Police brutality in the United States ===
Cases of fatal use of force by law enforcement officers in the United States, particularly against African Americans, have long led the civil rights movement and other activists to protest against the lack of police accountability in incidents involving excessive force. Many protests during the civil rights movement were a response to police brutality, including the 1965 Watts riots which resulted in the deaths of 34 people, mostly African Americans. The largest post-civil rights movement protest in the 20th-century was the 1992 Los Angeles riots, which were in response to the acquittal of police officers in using excessive force against Rodney King, an African-American man.

In 2014, the shooting of Michael Brown by police in Ferguson, Missouri, resulted in local protests and unrest and the killing of Eric Garner in New York City resulted in numerous national protests. After Eric Garner and George Floyd repeatedly said "I can't breathe" during their arrests, the phrase became a protest slogan against police brutality. In 2015, the killing of Freddie Gray by Baltimore police resulted in riots in the city and nationwide protests as part of the Black Lives Matter movement. Several nationally publicized incidents occurred in Minnesota, including the 2015 killing of Jamar Clark in Minneapolis; the 2016 killing of Philando Castile in Falcon Heights; and the 2017 killing of Justine Damond. In 2016, Tony Timpa was killed by Dallas police officers in the same way as George Floyd. In March 2020, the killing of Breonna Taylor by police, potentially serving a no-knock warrant, at her Kentucky apartment was also widely publicized.

According to a database of every fatal shooting by an on-duty police officer in the United States compiled by The Washington Post, 18 unarmed black people were shot by police in 2020, as of May 2023. As of that date, the database lists four people of unknown race, 26 white people, 10 Hispanic people, one Asian person, and one Native American person who were shot while unarmed. Black people, who account for less than 13 percent of the American population, are killed by police at a disproportionate rate, being killed at more than twice the rate of white people.

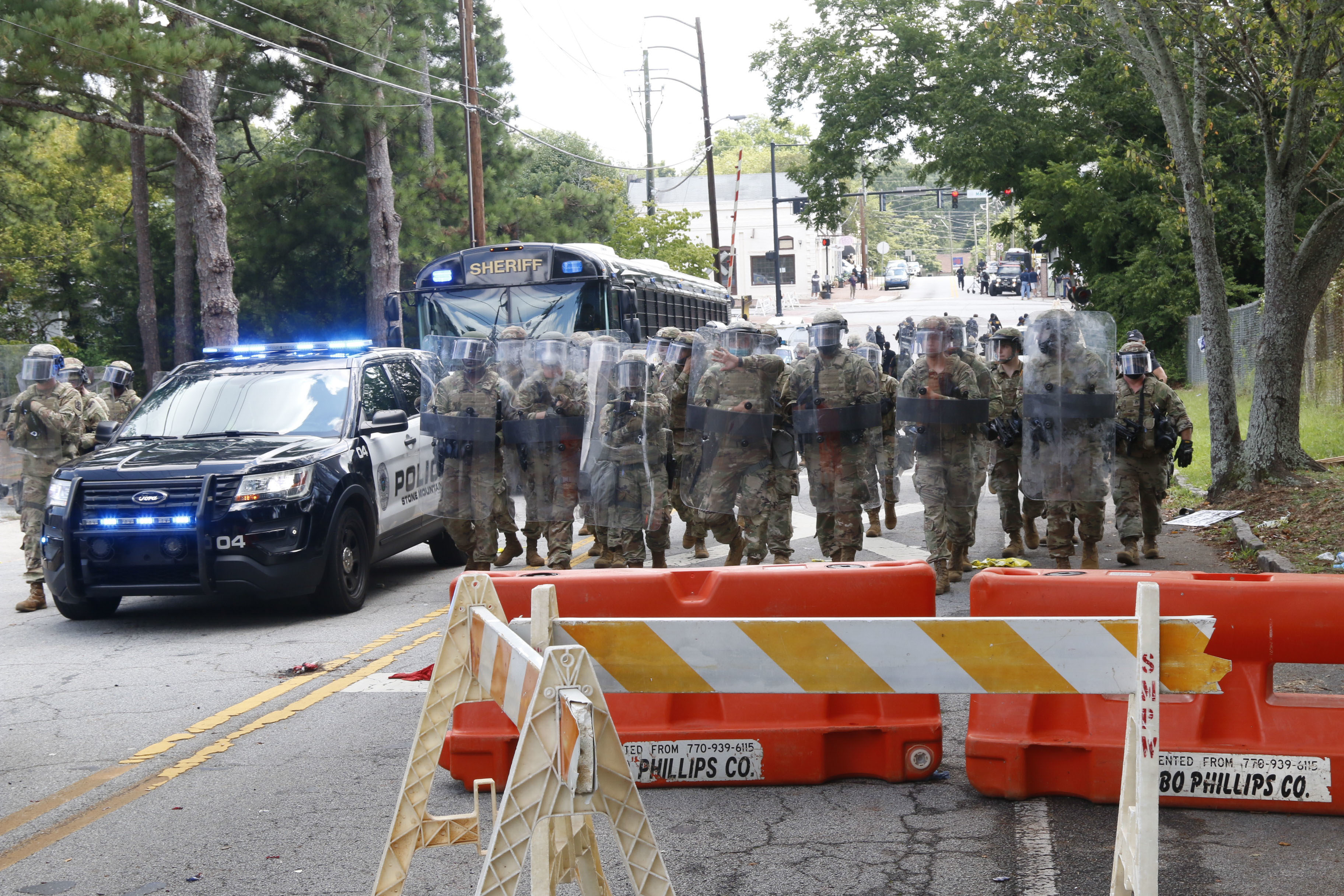
Police and National Guard during violent protests in Stone Mountain, Georgia on August 15, 2020

According to a data set and analysis which was released by the Armed Conflict Location and Event Data Project (ACLED) at the beginning of September, there were more than 10,600 demonstration events across the country between May 24 and August 22 which were associated with all causes: Black Lives Matter, counter-protests, COVID-19-pandemic-related protests, and others. After Floyd's murder, Black Lives Matter related protests sharply peaked in number at the end of May, declining to dozens per week by September. The ACLED characterized Black Lives Matter as "an overwhelmingly peaceful movement", finding that more than 93 percent of protests involved no incidents of violence nor destructive activity. Several other studies and analyses also found that the large majority of protests have been peaceful. In protests that were violent, violence was variously instigated by protesters, counter-protesters, or police, and police sometimes escalated violence. A September 2020 article in Axios reported that the vandalism and looting that did occur would result in at least $1 billion to $2 billion of paid insurance claims. The 2020 unrest cost the insurance industry far more than any prior incidents of social unrest.

At some protests, counter-protesters and right-wing infiltrators instigated or escalated violence. According to a Movement for Black Lives report, the US federal government targeted Black Lives Matter protesters during the summer of 2020 through increased police presence, the deployment of federal agents, the prosecution of protesters, and surveillance. According to Amnesty International's October 2020 report Losing the Peace: U.S. Police Failures to Protect Protesters from Violence, law enforcement agencies across the United States failed to protect protesters from violent armed groups. The incidents documented by Amnesty International show over a dozen protests and counter-protests erupted in violence with police either mostly, or entirely, absent from the scene. Amnesty International USA, jointly with the Center for Civilians in Conflict, Human Rights Watch, Physicians for Human Rights, and Human Rights First, sent a letter to governors of US states condemning abuses by law enforcement agencies and calling on governors to ensure the constitutional right to assemble peacefully.

=== Killing of Breonna Taylor ===
Breonna Taylor, a 26-year-old emergency medical technician, was fatally shot by Louisville Metro Police Department (LMPD) officers Jonathan Mattingly, Brett Hankison, and Myles Cosgrove on March 13, 2020. Three plainclothes LMPD officers entered her apartment in Louisville, Kentucky, executing a search warrant. Gunfire was exchanged between Taylor's boyfriend, Kenneth Walker, and the officers. Walker said that he believed that the officers were intruders. The LMPD officers fired over twenty shots. Taylor was shot eight times and LMPD Sergeant Jonathan Mattingly was injured by gunfire. Another police officer and an LMPD lieutenant were on the scene when the warrant was executed.

The primary targets of the LMPD investigation were Jamarcus Glover and Adrian Walker, who were suspected of selling controlled substances from a drug house more than 10 miles (16 km) away. According to a Taylor family attorney, Glover had dated Taylor two years before and continued to have a "passive friendship". The search warrant included Taylor's residence because it was suspected that Glover received packages containing drugs at Taylor's apartment and because a car registered to Taylor had been seen parked on several occasions in front of Glover's house.

Kenneth Walker, who was licensed to carry a firearm, fired first, injuring a law enforcement officer, whereupon police returned fire into the apartment with more than 20 rounds. A wrongful death lawsuit filed against the police by the Taylor family's attorney alleges that the officers, who entered Taylor's home "without knocking and without announcing themselves as police officers", opened fire "with a total disregard for the value of human life." According to the police account, the officers did knock and announce themselves before forcing entry.

With officials, media and general public distracted by the COVID-19 pandemic, the police killing of Taylor initially largely escaped widespread scrutiny. However, Taylor's death became one of the most discussed and protested events of the broader movement.

=== Murder of George Floyd ===
On May 25, 2020, at 8:08 p.m. CDT, Minneapolis Police Department (MPD) officers responded to a 9-1-1 call alleging a "forgery in progress" on Chicago Avenue South in Powderhorn, Minneapolis. MPD Officers Thomas K. Lane and J. Alexander Kueng arrived with their body cameras turned on. A store employee told officers that the man was in a nearby car. Officers approached the car and ordered George Floyd, a 46-year-old African-American man, who according to police "appeared to be under the influence", to exit the vehicle, at which point he "physically resisted". According to the MPD, officers "were able to get the suspect into handcuffs, and noted he appeared to be suffering medical distress. Officers called for an ambulance." Once Floyd was handcuffed, he and Officer Lane walked to the sidewalk. Floyd sat on the ground in Officer Lane's direction. In a short conversation, the officer asked Floyd for his name and identification, explaining that he was being arrested for passing counterfeit currency, and asked if he was "on anything". According to the report, officers Kueng and Lane attempted to help Floyd to their squad car, but at 8:14 p.m., Floyd stiffened up and fell to the ground. Soon, MPD Officers Derek Chauvin and Tou Thao arrived in a separate squad car. The officers made several more failed attempts to get Floyd into the squad car.

Floyd, who was still handcuffed, went to the ground face down. Officer Kueng held Floyd's back, and Lane held his legs. Chauvin placed his left knee in the area of Floyd's head and neck. A Facebook Live livestream recorded by a bystander showed officer Derek Chauvin kneeling on Floyd's neck. Floyd repeatedly tells Chauvin "Please" and "I can't breathe", while a bystander is heard telling the police officer, "You got him down. Let him breathe." After some time, a bystander points out that Floyd was bleeding from his nose while another bystander tells the police that Floyd is "not even resisting arrest right now", to which the police tell the bystanders that Floyd was "talking, he's fine". A bystander replies saying Floyd "ain't fine". A bystander then protests that the police were preventing Floyd from breathing, urging them to "get him off the ground ... You could have put him in the car by now. He's not resisting arrest or nothing." Floyd then goes silent and motionless. Chauvin does not remove his knee until an ambulance arrives. Emergency medical services put Floyd on a stretcher. Not only had Chauvin knelt on Floyd's neck for about seven minutes (including four minutes after Floyd stopped moving), but another video showed an additional two officers had also knelt on Floyd while another officer watched.

Although the police report stated that medical services were requested prior to the time Floyd was placed in handcuffs, according to the Minneapolis Star Tribune, Emergency Medical Services arrived at the scene six minutes after getting the call. Medics were unable to detect a pulse, and Floyd was pronounced dead at the hospital. An autopsy of Floyd was conducted on May 26, and the next day, the preliminary report by the Hennepin County Medical Examiner's Office was published, which found "no physical findings that support a diagnosis of traumatic asphyxia or strangulation". Floyd's underlying health conditions included coronary artery disease and hypertensive heart disease. The initial report said that "[t]he combined effects of Mr. Floyd being restrained by the police, his underlying health conditions and any potential intoxicants in his system likely contributed to his death." The medical examiner further said that Floyd was "high on fentanyl and had recently used methamphetamine at the time of his death".

On May 26, Chauvin and the other three officers were fired. He was charged with third-degree murder and second-degree manslaughter; the former charge was later changed to second-degree murder. On June 1, a private autopsy which was commissioned by the family of Floyd ruled that Floyd's death was a homicide and it also found that Floyd had died due to asphyxiation which resulted from sustained pressure, which conflicted with the original autopsy report which was completed earlier that week. Shortly after, the official post-mortem declared Floyd's death a homicide. Video footage of Officer Derek Chauvin applying 8 minutes 15 seconds of sustained pressure to Floyd's neck generated global attention and raised questions about the use of force by law enforcement.,

On June 3, Chauvin was charged with unintentional second-degree murder, third-degree murder, and second-degree manslaughter related to the incident, and officers Kueng, Lane, and Thao were charged with aiding and abetting second-degree murder. On April 20, 2021, Chauvin was found guilty of all charges by a 12-person grand jury. Two months later, on June 25, he was sentenced to 22.5 years in prison. Officers Kueng, Thao, and Thomas entered a plea deal averting trial.

== Major protests ==
=== Breonna Taylor protests, May 2020 – August 2022 ===
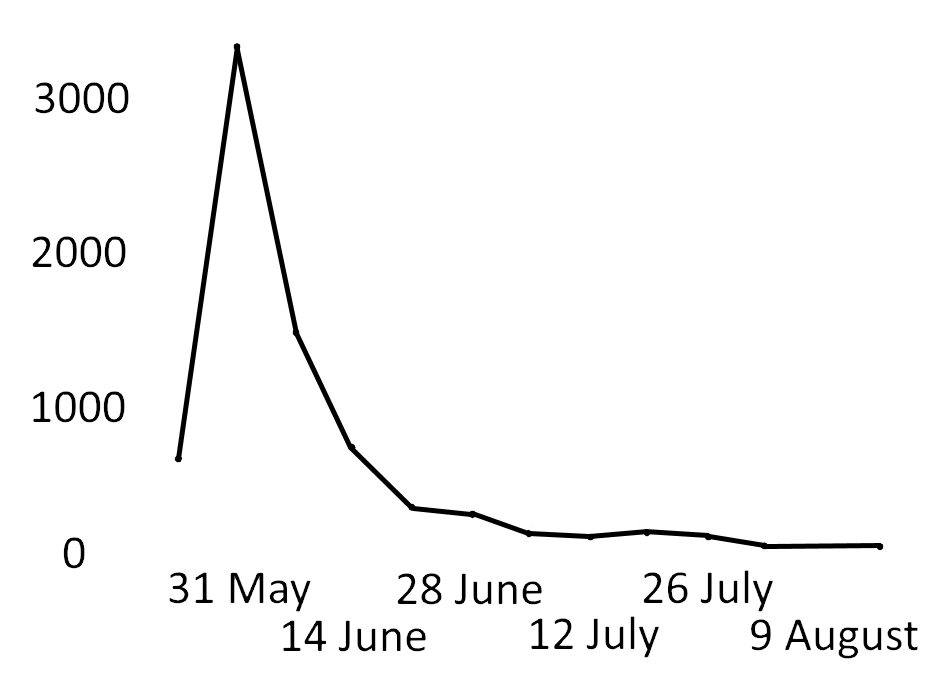
Number of Black Lives Matter-related demonstrations, May 24 – August 22, 2020, data by ACLED

On March 13, Breonna Taylor was shot and killed. Demonstrations over her death began on May 26, 2020, and lasted into August. One person was shot and killed during the protests.

Protest erupted again on September 23, the night after the grand jury verdict was announced, protesters gathered in the Jefferson Square Park area of Louisville, as well as many other cities in the United States, including Los Angeles, Dallas, Minneapolis, New York, Chicago, Seattle. In Louisville, two LMPD officers were shot during the protest and one suspect was kept in custody.

=== George Floyd protests, May 2020 – May 2023 ===
The major catalyst of the unrest was the murder of George Floyd on May 25. Though it was not the first controversial killing of a black person in 2020, it sparked a much wider series of global protests and riots which continued into August 2020. As of June 8, there were at least 19 deaths related to the protests. The George Floyd protests are generally regarded as marking the start of the 2020 United States unrest.

In Minneapolis–Saint Paul alone, the immediate aftermath of the murder of George Floyd was second-most destructive period of local unrest in United States history, after the 1992 Los Angeles riots. Over a three night period, the cities experienced two deaths, 617 arrests, and upwards of $500 million in property damage to 1,500 locations, including 150 properties that were set on fire.

The occupied protest at George Floyd Square was one of the longest in US history. The street intersection where Floyd was murdered was a continuous site of protest for over two years after his death. The protest movement rooted there persisted in 2023.

On May 2, 2023, the conclusion of the last criminal case for the four officers responsible for murdering George Floyd fulfilled a key demand of protesters that Minneapolis police officers Chauvin, Kueng, Lane, and Thao all be held legally accountable.

=== Capitol Hill Autonomous Zone, June–July 2020 ===
Established on June 8 in Seattle, CHAZ/CHOP was a self-declared autonomous zone established protesting the murder of George Floyd after police abandoned the East Precinct building. Groups like the Puget Sound John Brown Gun Club provided security while the protesters themselves provided either resources or assisted the PSJBGC in security. Multiple people were killed in altercations with security and on July 1 the autonomous zone/occupied protest was officially cleared by the Seattle Police Department.

=== Kenosha unrest and American athlete strikes, August 2020 ===
The shooting of Jacob Blake on August 23 sparked protests in a number of American cities, mostly within Kenosha. Two protesters were shot and killed in an incident during the protests. Nationally, athletes from the NHL, NBA, WNBA, MLB, and MLS began going on strike in response to the police shooting of Jacob Blake. On October 14, prosecutors announced that Kyle Rittenhouse, who was charged with killing the two protesters, would not face gun charges in Illinois.

On November 19, 2021, Kyle Rittenhouse was acquitted of all charges related to the incident in Wisconsin.

=== Minneapolis false rumors riot, August 2020 ===
Riot police in downtown Minneapolis, where rioting and looting took place on August 26, 2020

A riot occurred in downtown Minneapolis in reaction to false rumors about the suicide of Eddie Sole Jr., a 38-year-old African-American man; demonstrators believed he had been shot by police officers. Surveillance video showed that Sole Jr. shot himself in the head during a manhunt for a homicide suspect in which he was the person of interest. Controversially, the police released the CCTV camera footage of the suicide in attempts to stop the unrest. Overnight vandalism and looting of stores from August 26 to 27 reached a total of 77 property locations in Minneapolis–Saint Paul, including five businesses that were set on fire. State and local officials arrested a total of 132 people during the unrest. Three Minnesota residents were later convicted of federal charges for an arson attack on the Target Corporation headquarters building the night of August 26. A Minneapolis man pled guilty to a state assault charge for striking an officer with an object during the riot.

=== Red House eviction defense protest, December 2020 ===
On December 8, protesters in Portland gathered to blockade parts of the Humboldt Neighborhood in order to protect a family who had been evicted after living in said house for 65 years. Protesters blockaded the area similar to the Capitol Hill Occupied Protest.

=== Dolal Idd protests, December 2020 – January 2022 ===
Dolal Idd was a 23-year-old Somali-American man who was killed in an exchange of gunfire with Minneapolis police officers at approximately 6:15 p.m. CST on December 30, 2020, after he shot at them from inside the car he was driving. The fatal encounter happened in the US state of Minnesota during a police sting operation. The shooting took place in the parking lot of a busy Holiday gas station at the intersection of Cedar Avenue and East 36th Street in the Powderhorn Park neighborhood of Minneapolis, one mile (1.6 km) from the location where George Floyd was murdered by a Minneapolis police officer on May 25, 2020. Idd's death was the first killing by a Minneapolis police officer since that of Floyd. The shooting affected the local community still in mourning over Floyd's murder seven months prior, and reignited local debate over police brutality and race relations. In several rallies, protesters questioned the police narrative of the December 30 incident and if police officers could have used better de-escalation tactics to prevent an exchange of gunfire.

=== Trial of Derek Chauvin protests, March–June 2021 ===
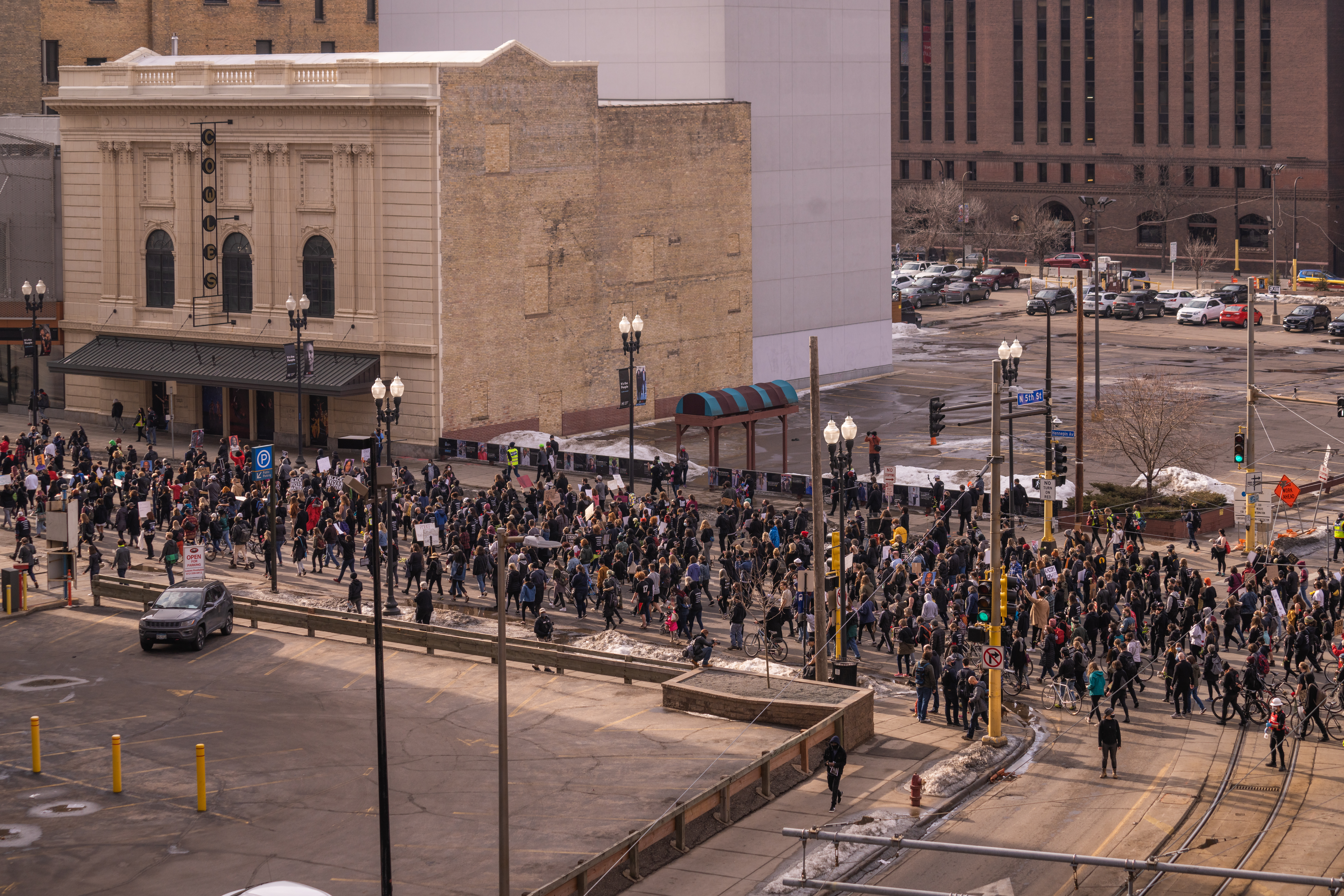
Protestors march in Minneapolis on March 7, 2021

Approximately a thousand protesters outside a downtown Minneapolis courthouse as Chauvin's trial commenced on March 8, 2021, to call for justice for Floyd and raise broader issues of racial injustice. Officials surrounded the facility with a concrete barrier, metal fencing, and barbed wire in anticipation of unrest. Protests and rallies planned for the George Floyd Square were halted for several days after a fatal shooting there on March 6, 2021.

On March 28, 2021, the day before opening statements in the trial of Derek Chauvin, several rallies and protests were held in Minneapolis. Separately, protesters marched in downtown Minneapolis to demand justice for Floyd and rallied at the Hennepin County Government Center and City Hall, and some demonstrators parked cars on the Metro light-rail tracks, which closed train traffic for several hours. At 38th and Chicago Avenue, the street intersection where Floyd was murdered, a group of people held a training workshop at the square on how to avoid arrest and keep calm if detained by police.

=== Atlanta shooting protests, March 2021 – 2022 ===
On March 16, 2021, a series of mass shootings occurred at three spas in metropolitan Atlanta, Georgia, United States. Eight people were killed, six of whom were Asian women. A suspect, 21-year-old Robert Aaron Long, was taken into custody later that day. Several anti-Asian violence rallies have been held across the United States in 2021 in response to the recent rise of racism against Asian Americans. Several of the rallies are named "Stop Asian Hate".

=== Daunte Wright protests, April–December 2021 and February 2022 ===
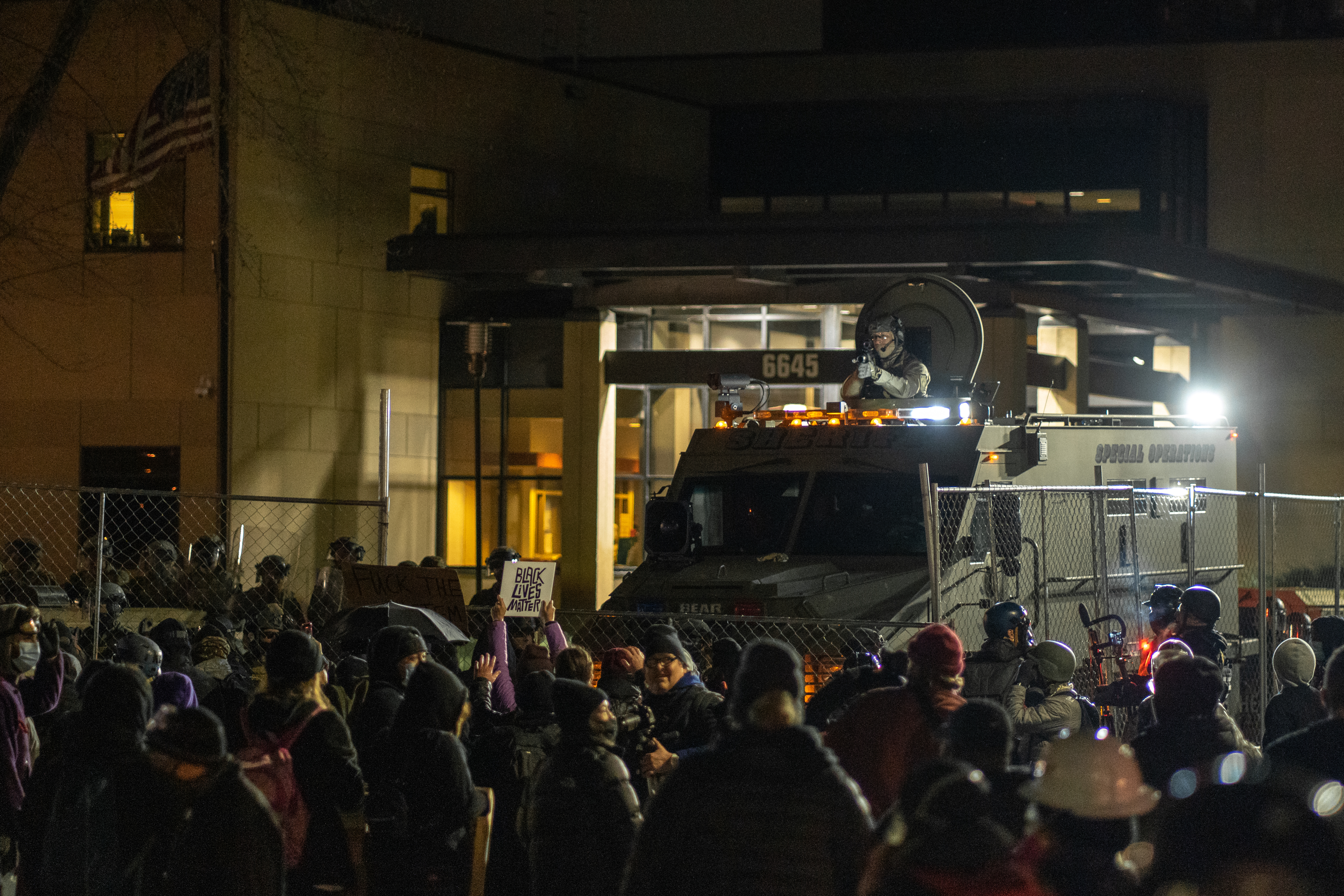
Protesters and police during the Daunte Wright protests in Brooklyn Center, Minnesota on April 14, 2021

On April 11, 2021, at 1:48 p.m., 20-year-old Daunte Wright was shot and killed during a traffic stop by Kim Potter, an officer with the police department of Brooklyn Center, a suburb of Minneapolis. His girlfriend, a passenger in his car, was also injured. An initially peaceful demonstration at the scene of the shooting turned violent following a strengthened police presence, and looting was reported. On April 13, 2021, Potter resigned, as well as Brooklyn Center police chief Tim Gannon, who said that Potter accidentally fired her gun. The next day, Potter was charged with second-degree manslaughter.

=== Winston Boogie Smith protests and Uptown unrest, June–November 2021 ===
Winston Boogie Smith, a 32-year-old black man, was shot and killed by law enforcement authorities on June 3, 2021, as they attempted to apprehend him at a parking ramp in the Uptown neighborhood of Minneapolis. Protests following the killing began on June 3 and continued for several days, primarily in Uptown. Soon after the shooting, Smith's family demanded greater law enforcement transparency and the release of any surveillance footage that might have captured the incident. Civil rights activists and Smith's friends and family disputed the law enforcement accounts of the incident. Local organization Communities United Against Police Brutality held a press conference near the shooting site on June 4 to call for officials to release video footage and other details of the shooting. Family and friends of Smith held a peaceful vigil the evening of June 4 at the parking ramp where he was killed, and participated in a protest march on June 6. Activist Nekima Levy Armstrong led a protest on June 8 outside the home of Minnesota's US Marshal, Ramona Dohman, calling for her resignation. Armstrong alleged that Dohman, a Trump administration appointee, had a conflict of interest due to a past working relationship with the Minnesota Bureau of Criminal Apprehension.

=== Kyle Rittenhouse protests, November 2021 ===
Several protests took place outside the Kenosha County Courthouse in Kenosha, Wisconsin during the trial of Kyle Rittenhouse between November 1, 2021, and November 19, 2021. Following Rittenhouse's acquittal on November 19, rioting broke out in Portland, Oregon. Large protests also occurred in New York City, Chicago, Los Angeles, and Minneapolis during the month.

=== Atlanta forest occupied protest, since late 2021 ===
Beginning in late 2021, protesters occupied a forested area of the Old Atlanta Prison Farm that was slated for redevelopment as a police training facility. Opponents of the facility particularly said it conflicted with their view of environmental justice and attempts to preserve the land as an urban park and conservation area, and that they were construction of a police facility in a Black and Brown neighborhood.

=== Amir Locke protests, February–April 2022 ===
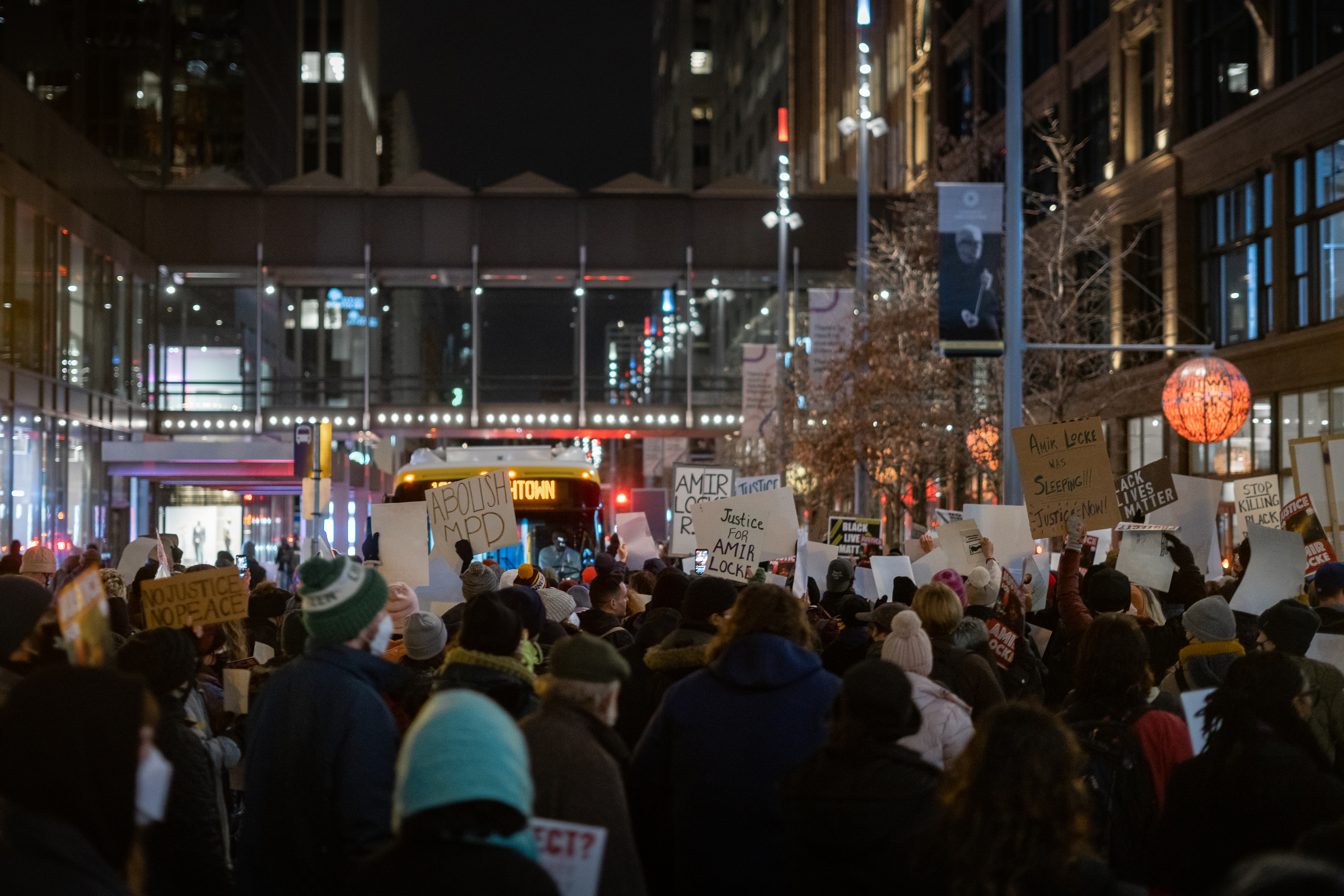
Amir Locke protest march in Minneapolis, February 8, 2022

On February 2, 2022, Minneapolis Police Department officer Mark Hanneman fatally shot Amir Locke, a 22-year old black man, while police officers were executing a search warrant at an apartment in downtown Minneapolis. The shooting occurred 9 seconds after police entered the apartment while Locke was lying on a couch while wrapped in a blanket and holding a gun. Several protests were held in Minneapolis and Saint Paul over the subsequent weeks. A protest over Locke's death was held in Chicago on February 11. In Portland, Oregon one person was killed and five others were wounded in a shooting on Saturday night during a protest in Portland against killings by police officers.

=== Portland protest shooting, February 2022 ===
In Portland, Oregon, protesters planned a demonstration for February 19 over the police killings of Amir Locke and Patrick Kimmons, who was fatally shot by Portland police in 2018. As people were gathering for a demonstration by Normandale Park in the Rose City Park neighborhood, a conflict between an armed Portlander and protesters resulted in a mass shooting with four people being injured by the shooter's gunfire, with one woman succumbing to her injuries. An armed protester returned gunfire and struck the shooter, which ended the shooting. The deceased was identified as Brandy "June" Knightly, a 60-year-old woman, who was an active with the local Black Lives Matter movement. Racial justice advocates expressed concern over the shooting at what began as a peaceful protest gathering. The shooter faced second-degree murder and other charges.

=== Jayland Walker protests, June–July 2022 ===
Following the death of Jayland Walker at the hands of the Akron Police, numerous protests broke out in Akron in following days.

=== Manuel Terán protests, January 2023 ===
Protests were held in several US cities in reaction to the killing of Manuel Terán, a Venezuelan-born person, who was fatally shot by a Georgia State Patrol officer on January 18, 2023, while protesting the construction of a police training facility in Atlanta, Georgia. An independent autopsy in March revealed that Terán was shot fourteen times while sitting cross-legged with their hands raised. The Stop Cop City protests that Terán was participating in were part of longstanding tensions over police killings in the United States since George Floyd's murder. Demonstrators opposed the construction of a police facility in a Black and Brown neighborhood. An anonymous protester identified Terán as one of the only Black or Brown persons who participated in the forest protest, and his killing raised further questions of racism in law enforcement conduct.

Notable protests and vigils were held in Atlanta, Bridgeport, Minneapolis, Nashville, Philadelphia, and Tucson from January 20–22, 2023. Some demonstrators spray painted graffiti on Bank of America buildings to protest the company's involvement in financing the facility's construction. Protests in Atlanta on January 21, 2023, briefly turned violent as some demonstrators threw objects, set police car on fire, and smashed windows of bank buildings with hammers. The Atlanta riot had broad participation from people across the United States. Six people—most of whom were White and from outside of the US state of Georgia—were arrested and charged criminally for actions during the January 21 riot. After arrests at a March music festival connected to the movement, defense attorneys for activists expressed concerns that police were targeting out-of-state individuals for arrest. One attorney stated that police appeared to "split detainees up into local people and out of towners." This concern is in reference to the fact that, out of 44 people detained at the festival, all 11 people released without charge were Atlanta residents.

=== Tyre Nichols protests, January–February 2023 ===
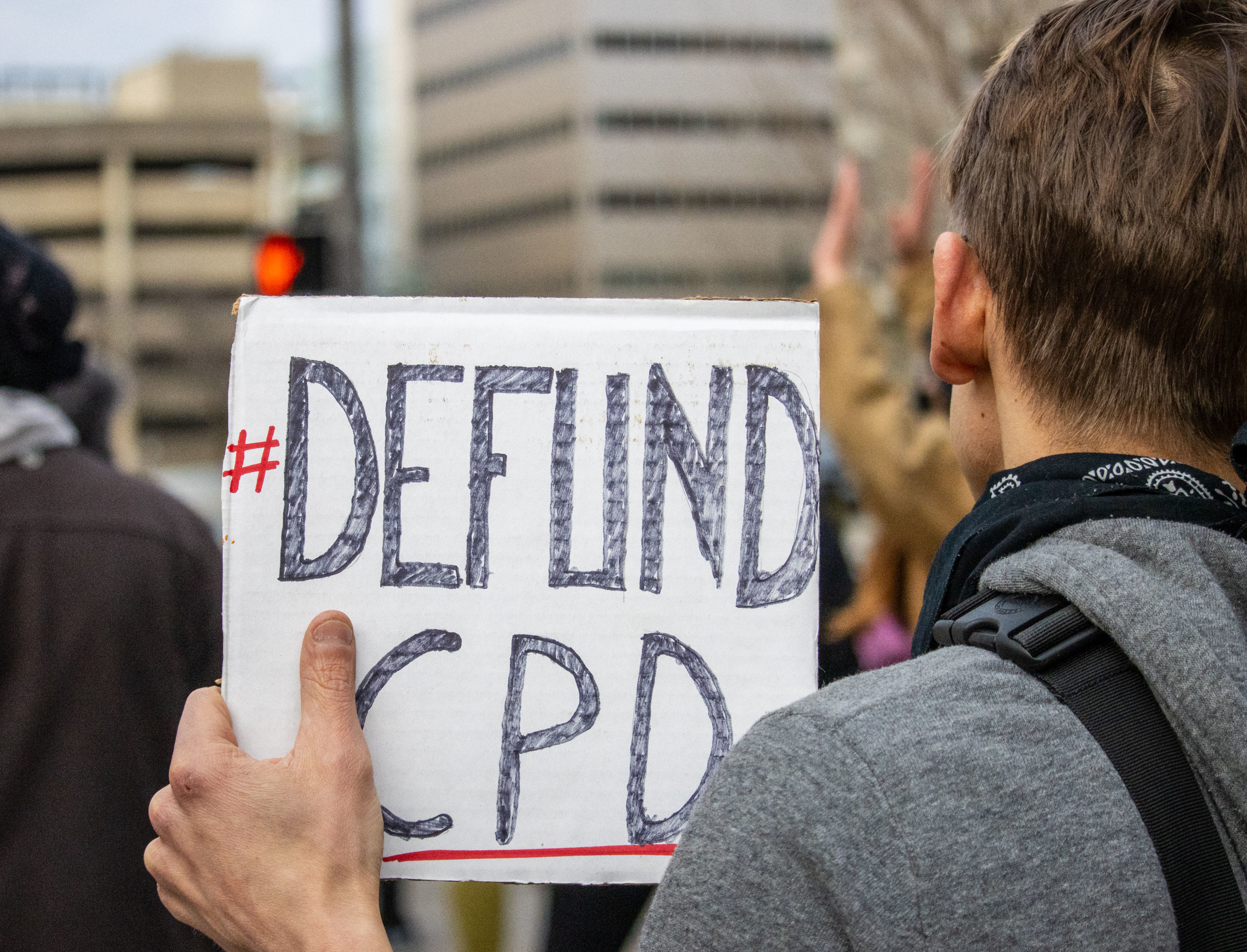
A protestor in Columbus, Ohio calling for the defunding of the Columbus Police Department.

Several major cities in the United States prepared for potential unrest ahead of the scheduled January 27, 2023, official release of video that captured the arrest and police beating of Tyre Nichols in Memphis, Tennessee, on January 7, 2023. Nichols died three days later, and five Memphis Police Department officers have been fired and face murder and other criminal charges. President Joe Biden joined Nichols' family in calling for peaceful protests. Several protests at police department facilities in the United States were planned ahead of the bodycam footage and video release to the public. Several state and local governments prepared security measures, such as the Georgia National Guard that was mobilized proactively.

=== Eddie Irizarry protests, September 2023 ===
On September 26, 2023, peaceful protests were held in Philadelphia, PA after a city judge dismissed murder charges against former Philadelphia Police Department Officer Mark Dial; Dial had shot and killed 27-year-old Eddie Irizarry during a traffic stop in August 2023. Later in the evening, looting broke out across the city, leaving multiple stores in Center City, North Philadelphia, and West Philadelphia ransacked. Interim Philadelphia Police Commissioner John Stanford said the looting was unrelated to the earlier peaceful protests and characterized the looters as "...a bunch of criminal opportunists take advantage of a situation to make an attempt to destroy our city."

== Themes and demands ==
=== "Defund the police" ===
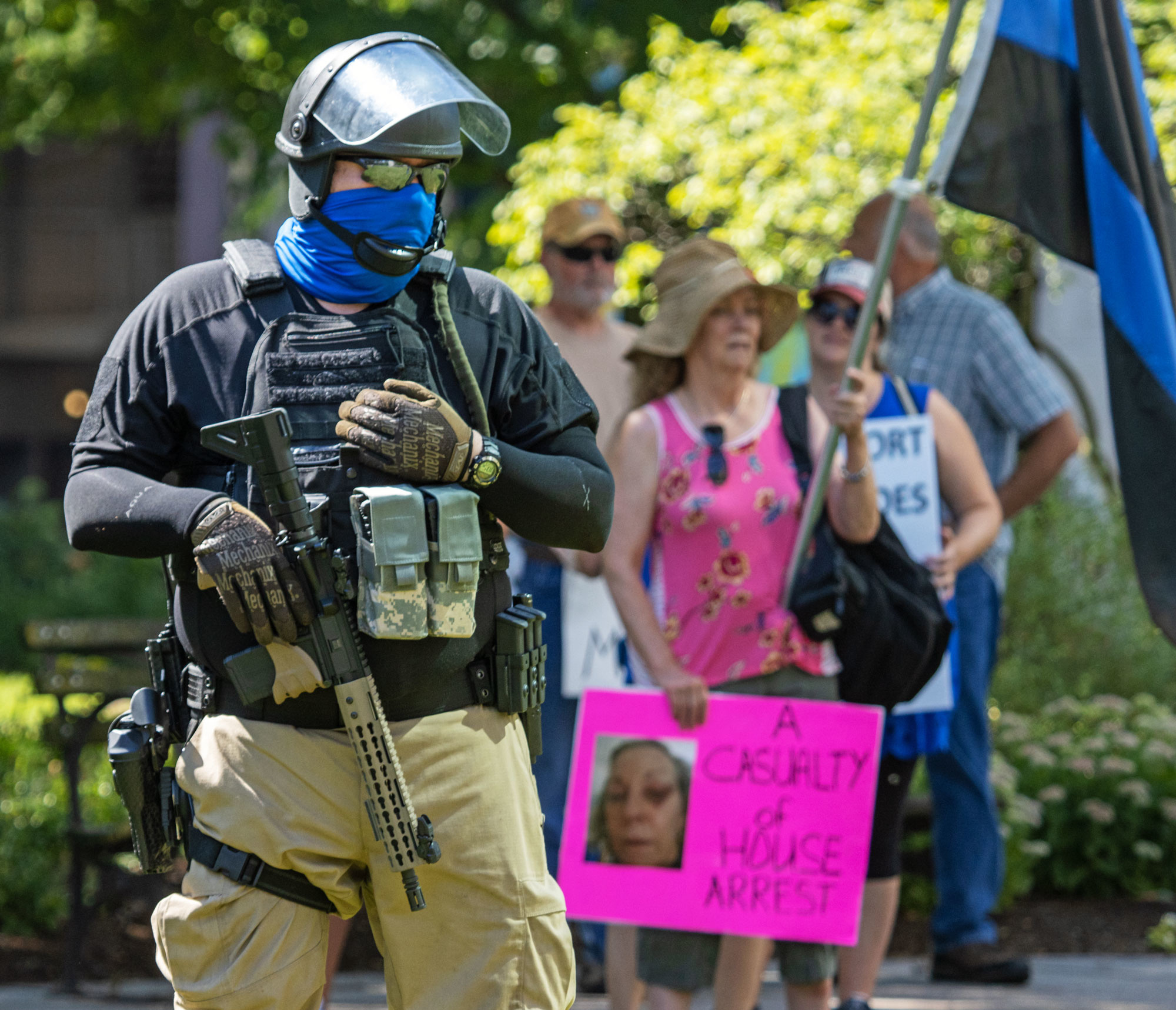
An armed supporter of the Blue Lives Matter countermovement during the George Floyd protests

Unlike recent racial protests in the United States before it, the 2020 protests frequently included the slogan "defund the police", representing a call for divestment in policing. The degree of divestment advocated varied, with some protesters calling for the elimination of police departments and others for reduced budgets. Supporters of partial or complete defunding of the police argued that budgets should be directed instead towards community-driven police alternatives, investment in mental health and substance abuse treatment services, job-training programs, or other forms of investment into black urban communities. In June 2020, New York City mayor Bill De Blasio responded to calls for divestment by cutting $1 billion of the New York City Police Department (NYPD)'s $6 billion budget and directing it instead to city youth groups and social services, a reduction of 17 percent. The cut mostly involved shifting some responsibilities to other city agencies, with the size of the force barely changing.

The city council in Minneapolis voted in June to "end policing as we know it" and replace it with a "holistic" approach to public safety, but by September 2020, the pledge collapsed without implementation. An increasing number of community groups had opposed the pledge, a poll from the Minneapolis Star-Tribune showed that a plurality of residents, including 50 percent of black people, opposed decreasing the size of the police force, and city councilors cited alarm from business owners and residents in more affluent areas of their wards who feared for their safety, as beliefs anticipating an immediate end to the police department proliferated. Incremental reforms of a type that the city's progressive politicians had denounced were pursued in lieu of the pledge. The Black Visions Collective, an activist group seeking police abolition, called past reforms "weak" and stated, "It is the nature of white supremacy, capitalism, patriarchy or any of these other systems of oppression to want to do what is necessary to save themselves."

Nationwide, defunding the police has not received broad support from congressional Democrats. Senator Bernie Sanders, a former Democratic presidential candidate, and Democratic President Joe Biden, both support police reform instead. During the 2020 campaign, President Donald Trump heavily criticized the "defund the police" movement; Trump and his campaign, as well as Trump allies, repeatedly and falsely claimed that Biden supported police defunding.

According to a report released by Movement for Black Lives, the US federal government deliberately targeted Black Lives Matter protesters with heavier penalties in an attempt to disrupt the movement.

=== Monument removals ===
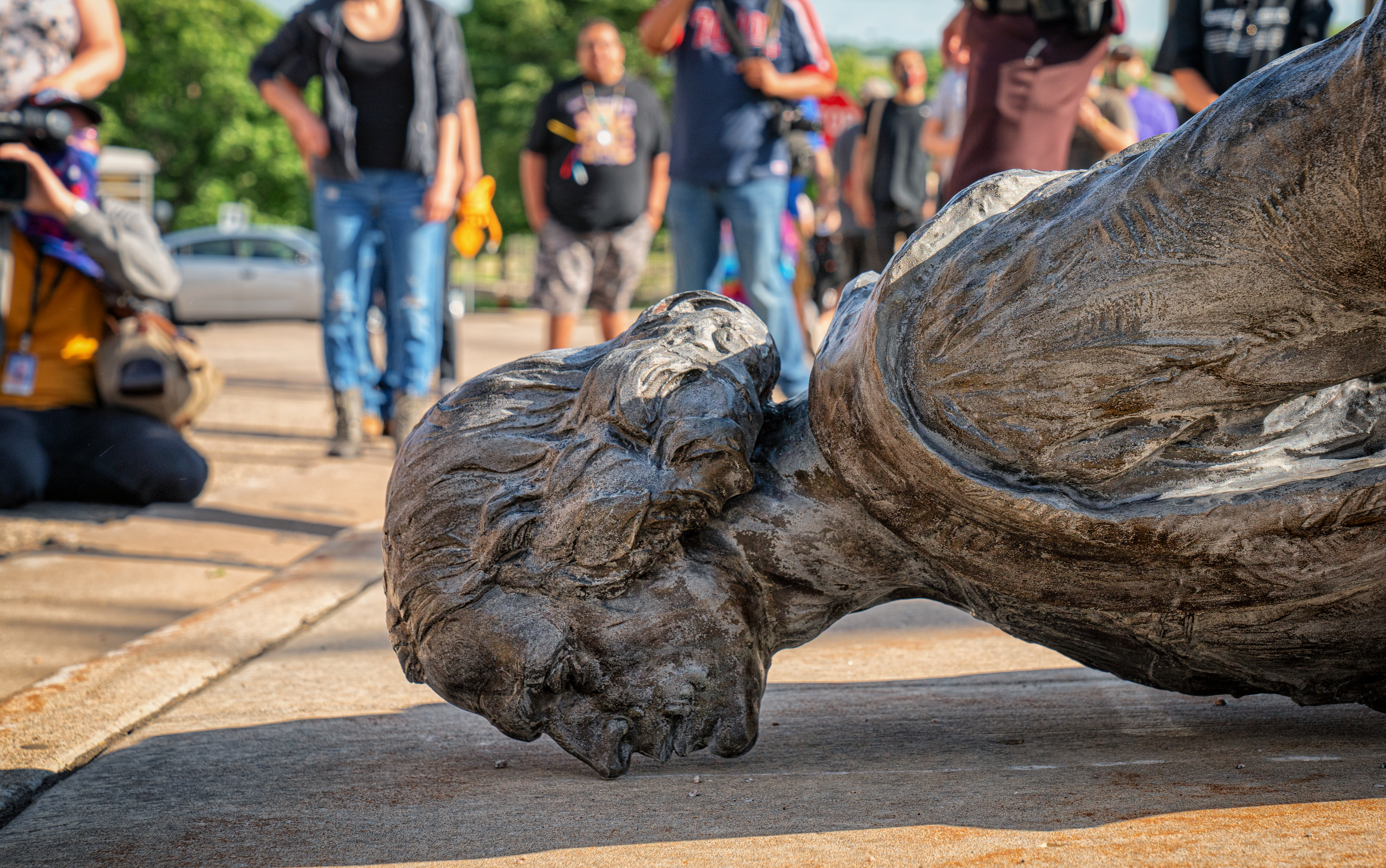
Members of the American Indian Movement toppled a statue of Christopher Columbus in Saint Paul, Minnesota, on June 10, 2020.

Protesters have called for the removal of statues commemorating historical figures, such as Confederate war veterans and politicians as well as Christopher Columbus, who are perceived as racist by modern standards and, according to some historians, by the standards of their time as well. Often those depicted in the statues were responsible for human rights violations. Additionally, many monuments to the Civil War were only put up during times of tension over civil rights long after the war ended: in the early 1900s when Jim Crow laws were being implemented and in the 1950s and 1960s during the movement against this legislation. This led some historians to conclude they were constructed to further a "white supremacist future" rather than simply honor history. A number were either removed by authorities, or vandalized and toppled by protesters. Statues of United States presidents, including the Emancipation Memorial featuring Abraham Lincoln, have also been vandalized and attacked by protesters. Some pro-Union or anti-slavery monuments were also targeted, as they were seen to embody disrespectful attitudes towards Native Americans or the enslaved. In one case, a statue of abolitionist Hans Christian Heg was torn down.

== Related racial unrest outside the United States ==
Writing for Foreign Affairs, professor Brenda Gayle Plummer noted that "The particulars of Floyd's murder, taking place against the backdrop of the pandemic, may well have been the dam-break moment for the global protest movement. But they are only part of the story. International solidarity with the African American civil rights struggle comes not from some kind of projection or spontaneous sentiment; it was seeded by centuries of black activism abroad and foreign concern about human rights violations in the United States."

=== The Netherlands ===
Related racial unrest in the Netherlands included widespread participation in George Floyd protests. The unrest has led to a change in public opinion on Zwarte Piet, a character used in Dutch Sinterklaas celebrations who has been historically portrayed in blackface. Leaving the appearance of Zwarte Piet unaltered has traditionally been supported by the public but opposed by anti-racism campaigners, but a June 2020 survey saw a drop in support for leaving the character's appearance unaltered: 47 per cent of those surveyed supported the traditional appearance, compared to 71 per cent in a similar survey held in November 2019. Prime minister Mark Rutte stated in a parliamentary debate on June 5, 2020, that he had changed his opinion on the issue and now has more understanding for people who consider the character's appearance to be racist.

An emerging trend is to replace Zwarte Piet with Chimney Piet, to avoid the controversial blackface makeup.

=== United Kingdom ===
The 2020–21 United States racial unrest has triggered protests, political gestures and policy changes in the United Kingdom, both in solidarity with the United States and in comparable protest against racism in the United Kingdom. The debate over statues of certain historical figures has been a significant feature of the unrest in Britain, following the unauthorized removal of the statue of Edward Colston in Bristol on June 11 during a protest in the city. The Culture Secretary Oliver Dowden wrote a three-page letter to MPs, peers and councillors arguing against the removal of statues. Prime Minister Boris Johnson condemned protesters who defaced the statue of Winston Churchill in Parliament Square in London, and several statues were subsequently covered up as a precaution.

== Social impact ==
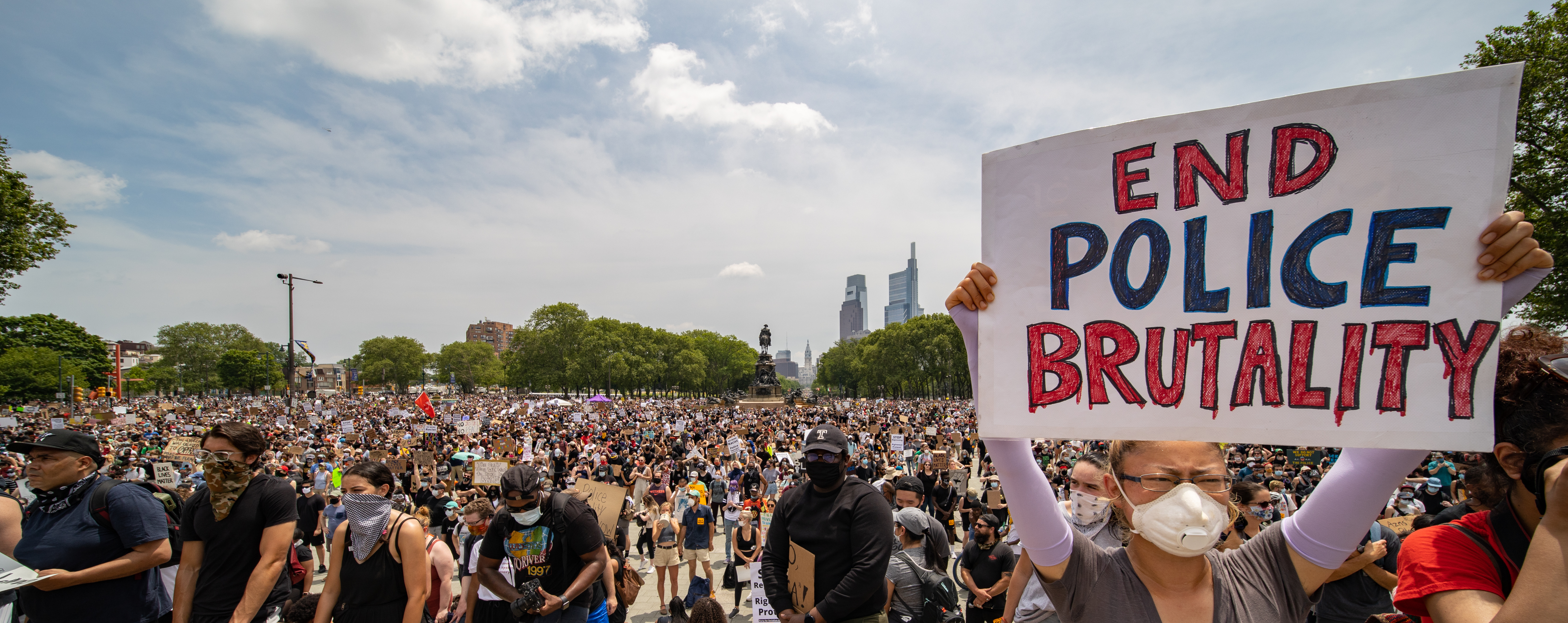
George Floyd protest in Philadelphia on June 6, 2020

In late May to June 2020, the high-profile murders of George Floyd and Ahmaud Arbery, along with the shooting of Breonna Taylor, led to a racial reckoning that greatly increased sentiment regarding systemic racism in the United States, with changes occurring in public opinion, government, industry, education and sports. This racial reckoning aimed at confronting a legacy of systemic inequality and racial injustice stemming from overt discrimination and unconscious bias in the societal treatment of black Americans, who have experienced disproportionately negative outcomes in the form of racial inequality such as in education, health care, housing, imprisonment, voting rights and wages. While most black Americans acutely felt these issues, many white Americans were insulated.

Previously, there had been protests and riots over the killings of black Americans by law enforcement. The 2014 killing of Michael Brown, the 2014 killing of Eric Garner, the 2015 Charleston church shooting, and the 2017 Charlottesville rally received headlines yet did not lead to systemic change or as wide a level of support. However, the videos of Floyd's murder and police violence at protests resonated with many white Americans. White people have attended the George Floyd protests and continuing related protests in greater numbers than they had prior protests of killings of black Americans by law enforcement. Demonstrators revived a public campaign for the removal of Confederate monuments and memorials as well as other historic symbols such as statues of venerated American slaveholders and modern display of the Confederate battle flag. Public backlash widened to other institutional symbols, including place names, namesakes, brands and cultural practices. This itself has sparked conflict, between left-wing and right-wing groups, often violent. Several far-right groups, including civilian militias and white supremacists, have fought with members of "a broad coalition of leftist anti-racist groups" in street clashes.

=== Public opinion ===
By mid-June, American national culture and attitude towards racial injustice began to shift, including the Senate Armed Services Committee's approval of process to rename military facilities named for Confederate generals. American public opinion of racism and discrimination shifted in the wake of these protests. Polling of white Americans showed an increased belief in having received advantages due to their race and increased belief that black Americans received disproportionate force in policing. Public opinion in support of the Black Lives Matter movement greatly increased, with a surge of "am I racist" searches and a greater approval for removing Confederate statues and memorials. However, support for the Black Lives Matter movement declined by August and September 2020.

=== Public debate ===
Mississippi retired its prior state flag (left)–which featured a Confederate battle flag in its canton–and adopted a new flag (right) in 2020.

Faced with civil unrest, politicians fulfilled promises to remove Confederate symbols. Mississippi voted to retire and replace its state flag. The removal of symbols caused national debate over the appropriateness of statues of figures tied to racial injustice.

Public conversations on race and power extended to other cultural practices. One debate addressed racial vocabulary. Various news organizations modified their style guides to capitalize "Black" as a proper noun in recognition of the term's shared political identity and experiences. Merriam-Webster modified its definition of racism. The major sports channel ESPN began to air political commentary, reversing a longstanding mandate to separate sports from politics.

The recent scrutiny on race relations in the United States brought comparisons to the Weinstein effect in which the Me Too movement put pressure on public figures for legacies of sexual assault, harassment, and systemic sexism. Similarly, the American public, under its racial injustice reckoning, pressured American industries to confront legacies of racism. The resulting symbolic divestments targeted white cultural hegemony. NPR wrote that renamed landmarks and similar gestures would not provide economic opportunities or civil rights, but signaled cultural disapproval towards symbols associated with racial injustice, including the history of racism and slavery. The New Yorker compared the dispersed national response to an "American Spring" on par with the Arab Spring and other international revolutionary waves. Global protests also focused on symbols of racial injustice, with The New Yorker also having a part on international solidarity towards police violence.

=== Consumer behavior ===
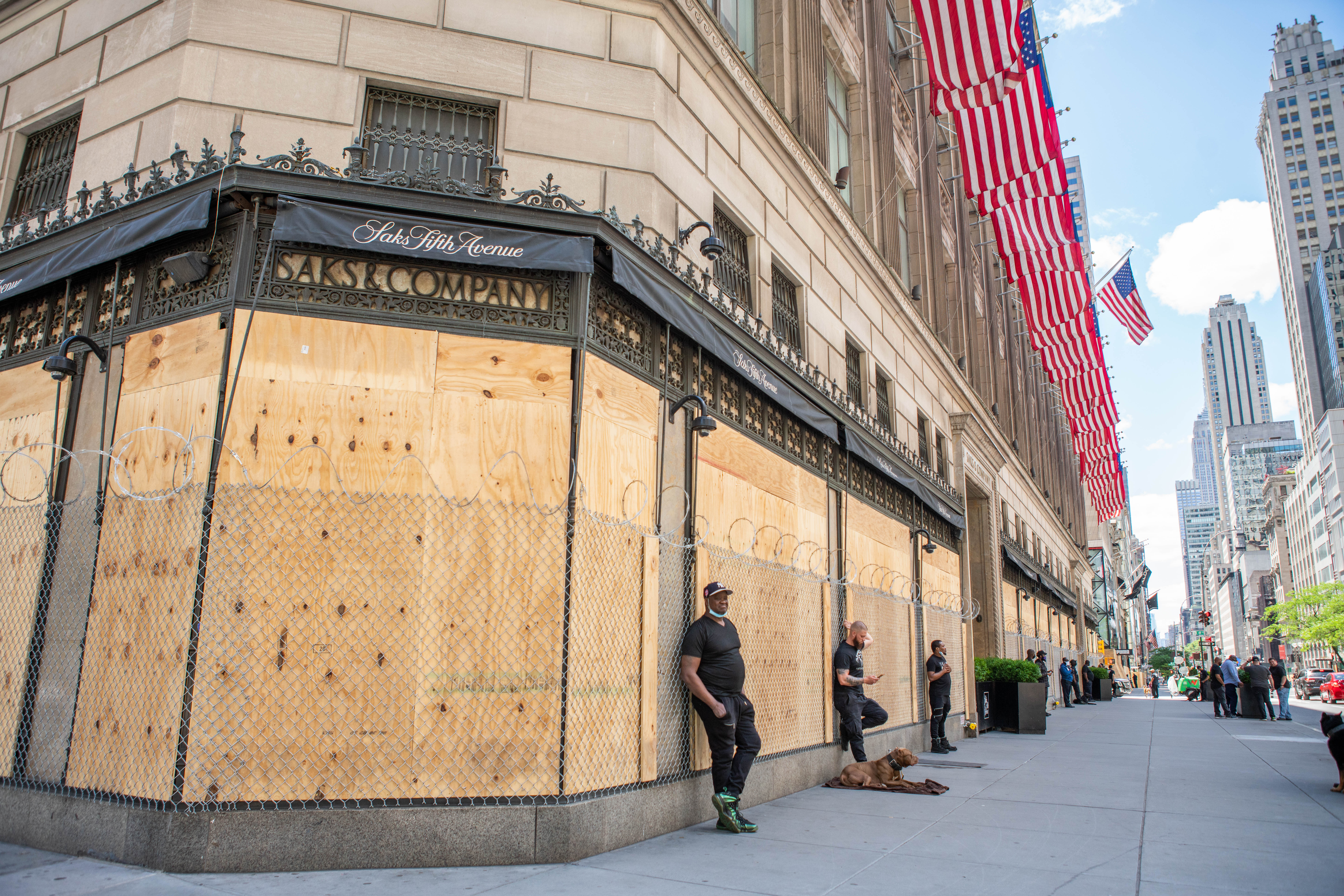
Boarded-up storefronts at New York City's Saks Fifth Avenue during the George Floyd protests.

Anti-racist self-education became a trend throughout June 2020 in the United States, and black anti-racist writers found new audiences. During the Floyd protests, black-owned bookstores saw an influx of interest, especially for books on social justice topics. In the span of two weeks from early to late June, books about race went from composing none to two-thirds of The New York Times Best Seller list. Amazon sales saw a similar pattern. In comparison, no such surge happened after prior prominent Black Lives Matter demonstrations. Online library checkouts of anti-racist literature increased tenfold by mid-June. Some municipal libraries saw waitlists in the thousands per title. Amazon's tracking of daily e-book readers and audiobook listeners reflected the increased readership, when many of the aforementioned books entered its most-read list.

American consumers sought out black-owned businesses to support. June saw record high Google searches for "black-owned businesses near me" and smartphone restaurant discovery apps added features for discovering black-owned restaurants. Businesses on social media lists saw significantly increased sales. Black-owned bookstores in particular had difficulty meeting demand. Consumer concerns over hate speech on social media platforms caused some companies to implement temporary boycotts on advertising on certain platforms. Many major American corporations pursued anti-racism and diversity training workshops, particularly companies seeking to be consistent with their Black Lives Matter message. Demand for these trainings had grown over time, especially since 2016, and interest in diversity training bookings spiked during this period.

=== Firearms ===
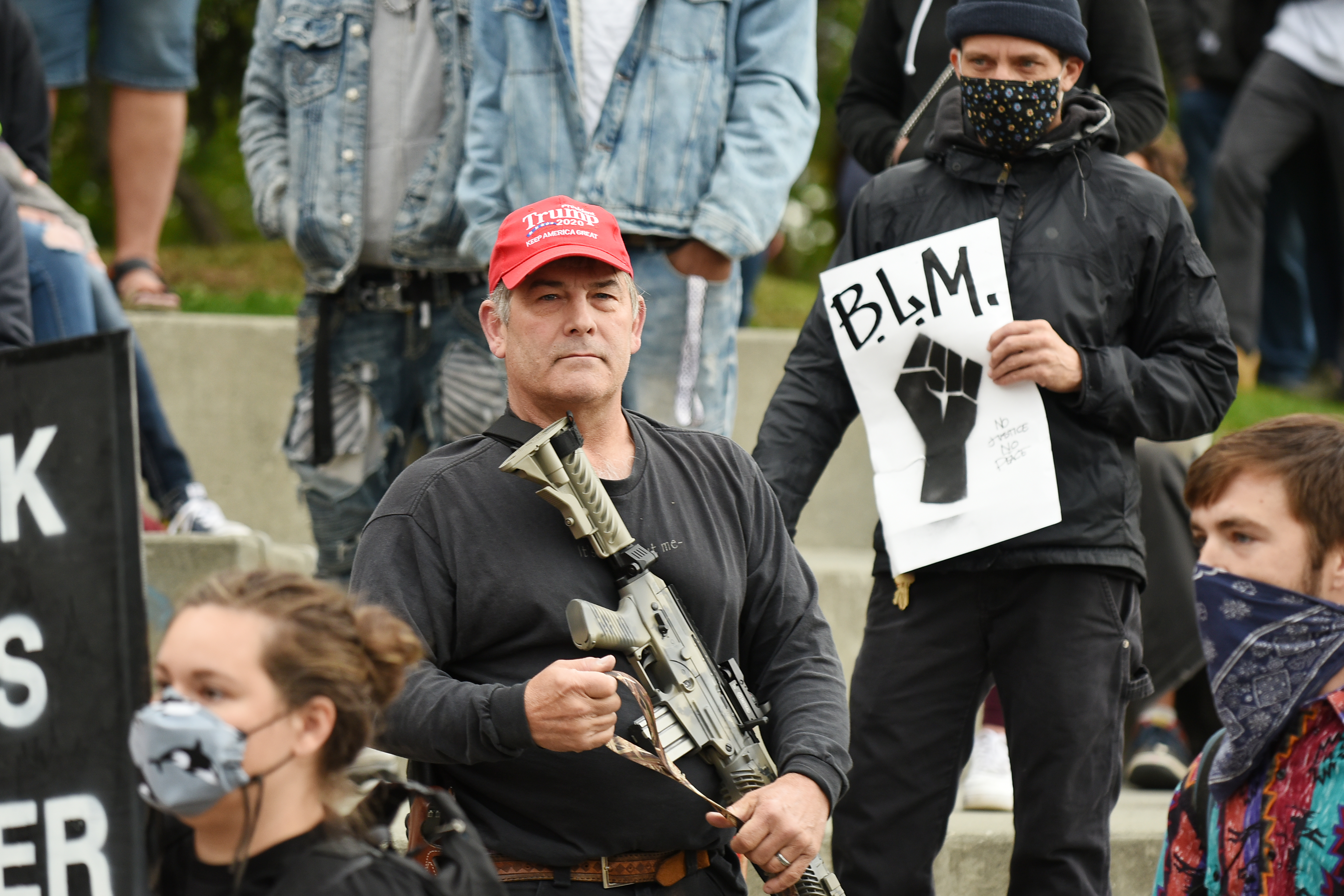
Armed counter-protester at an event in Anchorage, Alaska commemorating the 57th anniversary of the March on Washington, September 7, 2020

The unrest precipitated an unprecedented number of firearm sales in the United States. Background checks for legally purchased firearms reached record highs starting in May, with year-on-year numbers up 80.2 percent and running through the rest of the summer. This represented the highest monthly number of firearms transfers since the FBI began keeping records in 1998.

In May 2020, firearms retailers surveyed by the National Shooting Sports Foundation estimated that 40 percent of their sales came from first-time gun buyers, 40 percent of those first-time gun buyers were women. Gun sales have been up across the country. A rise in first-time gun buyers in liberal-leaning states like California has helped fuel the national uptick in firearms and ammunition purchases. June 2020 represented the largest month of firearms purchases in United States history, with Illinois purchasing more firearms than any other state.

According to the Bureau of Alcohol, Tobacco, Firearms and Explosives (ATF), in the last days of May and the first week of June 2020, there were more than 90 attempted or successful burglaries of gun stores. More than 1,000 guns were stolen in that window of time. On May 31 alone, the BATF reported 29 separate burglaries targeting licensed firearm retailers.

== Maps ==
Minneapolis civil unrest, East Lake Street

Saint Paul civil unrest, University Avenue West

Minneapolis civil unrest, Midtown

Seattle civil unrest, Capitol Hill

Portland civil unrest, downtown

Kenosha civil unrest, downtown

Portland civil unrest, Humboldt

== See also ==
- Killing of Manuel Ellis
- Death of Elijah McClain
- List of expulsions of African Americans
- List of incidents of civil unrest in the United States
- Lynching in the United States
- Mass racial violence in the United States
- Nativism (politics)#United States
  - Nativism in United States politics
- Racism against African Americans
  - Racism in the United States
- Slavery in the United States
- White backlash#United States
- White nationalism#United States
  - White nationalism in the United States
- Xenophobia#United States
  - Xenophobia in the United States
- Stop Asian Hate
- Timeline of notable Black Lives Matter events and demonstrations in the United States
- 2020–21 United States election protests

Similar periods of unrest

- Nadir of American race relations
- Reconstruction era
- Red Summer (1919)
- Ghetto riots in the United States (1964–1969)
  - 1965 Watts riots
  - Long, hot summer of 1967
  - 1968 King assassination riots
- 1980 Miami riots
- 1991 Crown Heights riot
- 1992 Los Angeles riots
- Arab Spring
- 2014 Ferguson unrest
- 2015 Baltimore protests
- Protests against Rodrigo Duterte
- Protests against Donald Trump
- 2017 Charlottesville protests (Unite the Right rally)

Portrayals in media

- Eddington – 2025 film taking place in 2020 largely focused on the cultural impact of the George Floyd protests
