= Killings of Aaron Danielson and Michael Reinoehl =

2020 killings in the United States

On August 29, 2020, Aaron Danielson, an American supporter of the far-right group Patriot Prayer, was shot and killed, allegedly by a far-left activist, after participating in a caravan which drove through Portland, Oregon, displaying banners and signs supporting President Donald Trump, and clashing with participants in the local George Floyd protests.

On September 3, 2020, Danielson's suspected killer, Michael Reinoehl, an American anti-fascist activist was shot and killed by a federally led fugitive task force near Lacey, Washington. Reinoehl had admitted to killing Danielson in an interview shortly before his death, stating it was in self-defense and that he believed Danielson was about to stab another protester. Police said Reinoehl had followed and targeted Danielson, who was armed with a pistol, baton, and bear spray, but no knife; Reinoehl said that police were collaborating with far-right activists who were hunting him. Danielson's killing was the first time in over 26 years that a self-identified anti-fascist activist had been charged with homicide. President Donald Trump commended the U.S. Marshals for shooting Reinoehl, describing it as "retribution", and claiming to have personally "sent in" the U.S. Marshals to "get" Reinoehl during the first presidential debate with Joe Biden.

An investigation by the Thurston County Sheriff's Office stated that Reinoehl had most likely initiated an exchange of gunfire with officers before he was killed. However, some witnesses stated that officers opened fire without warning, and a review by The New York Times also disputed the official statement, concluding that local investigators had discounted key pieces of evidence indicating that Reinoehl never fired or pointed a weapon.

== Background ==
In the weeks and months prior to the two killings, Portland was the site of significant protests against police brutality and racism in the United States, as part of the American and international protests that followed the murder of George Floyd in May 2020. These protests saw confrontations between protesters and right-wing counter-protesters. Right-wing counter-protestors were reported to fire paintball guns and release bear spray at protestors, and protestors were reported as releasing fireworks and other objects.

On August 29, 2020, hundreds of Trump supporters took part in the "Trump 2020 Cruise Rally", a caravan of more than 100 cars and trucks displaying pro-Trump flags and signs which drove through downtown Portland. The rally was set up by Meridian-based real-estate developer Alex Kuzmenko, who used an assumed name to organize the activities on Facebook and other social media. Caravan participants and counterprotesters got into heated and sometimes violent confrontations.

== Aaron Danielson ==
Aaron Danielson
- Born: Aaron Joseph Danielson; September 4, 1980; Spokane, Washington, U.S.
- Died: August 29, 2020 (aged 39); Portland, Oregon, U.S.
- Cause of death: Gunshot wound
- Occupation: Moving company owner
- Known for: Being killed, allegedly by Michael Reinoehl, during 2020 Portland George Floyd protests

Aaron Joseph Danielson (September 4, 1980 – August 29, 2020) was a resident of Portland. Danielson was born and raised in Spokane, Washington. He attended local schools including Shadle Park High School, dropping out during his senior year and then briefly working as a mover in Spokane. Danielson moved to Portland soon after and together with a friend established a moving company which transported heavy items such as safes, hot tubs, stoves and statues. He never married and did not have children.

According to Portland Tribune articles published after his death, Danielson spent much of his free time with a racially mixed group of people in his neighborhood, and black friends spoke up for him. Danielson was characterized by those who knew him as neither a radical, nor a racist or fascist, although he could on occasion be politically provocative and was said to have had a long-standing penchant for conspiracy theories. Like Reinoehl, Danielson was drawn to the protests, heading into downtown Portland on his mountain board and posting videos of them almost every night. According to The Spokesman-Review, there were no reports or publicly released videos of Danielson having been involved in any physical conflicts during the protests, apart from his killing.

Danielson's parents said he blamed antifa for destruction in Portland and was convinced that the group was funded by someone who wanted America destroyed by civil war. Danielson's parents said he had always been a staunch Republican, but that more recently, especially since the start of the protests, they had noticed that his views had shifted, stating: "He started to get more and more concerned about government taking over, the U.N. coming in, China controlling everything. I mean, we started hearing about it. We hadn't heard about it before that." Danielson frequently texted them and sent them videos to watch.

Danielson was a supporter of the right-wing group Patriot Prayer, of which his parents said they were unaware. According to Patriot Prayer founder Joey Gibson, Danielson had been attending the group's rallies for about three years. Chandler Pappas, a fellow Patriot Prayer supporter who was with Danielson on the night he was killed, reportedly told Danielson's parents that their son's involvement had been limited and begun more recently, around nine months prior. Danielson was known within the group by the alias "Jay" and took part in the Trump 2020 Cruise Rally wearing a Patriot Prayer hat. He had volunteered to provide security for the rally.

=== Shooting of Danielson ===
External media

Images
- Surveillance camera image showing a man identified by police as Reinoehl concealing himself to wait until Danielson (left) and Pappas, pointed out by red arrows, had passed
- The man identified as Reinoehl emerging from his place of concealment, reaching toward a pocket or pouch on his waistband

Video
- Video posted by YouTube account "Stumptown Matters"
- Video by Justin Dunlap

Danielson was shot and killed at about 8:45 p.m. on August 29, 2020, near the intersection of Southwest 3rd Avenue and Alder Street in Portland. Reinoehl was identified as the shooter on social media within hours. A police affidavit requesting a warrant for Reinoehl's arrest, released after his death, included surveillance camera evidence showing that Reinoehl had spotted Danielson and Pappas walking behind him and had hidden in a parking garage to let them pass. When Danielson and Pappas crossed the road, Reinoehl, joined by an associate, followed them while "reaching toward the pocket or pouch on his waistband", with the shooting occurring moments later. Immediately prior to the shooting, someone was heard to shout "We've got a couple right here", followed first by a warning that Danielson was preparing to use a can of mace and then two gunshots. The actual shooting was not recorded by the surveillance camera, but it was captured on videos recorded by bystanders that circulated online.

According to the police affidavit, Danielson had a loaded Glock pistol in a holster and was holding a can of bear spray and an expandable metal baton. Danielson's can of bear spray is believed to have been struck by the first bullet due to damage to the can and a gaseous cloud that erupted after the first shot was fired. The second bullet hit Danielson's upper right chest, killing him.

In an interview with a freelance journalist that was aired by Vice, Reinoehl said he acted in self-defense as Danielson was about to stab another protester with a knife. However, no knife was found on Danielson.

At a memorial held in a park in Vancouver, Washington, Patriot Prayer founder Joey Gibson urged mourners not to seek vengeance, saying: "I know that Jay would not want that. Jay wants us to stand up for what we believe in, and he does not want any more violence, guys." Danielson's father, speaking to a reporter at home in Spokane County, expressed a wish for Democrats to "get together with the Republican side and put a stop to this violence. If I can lose the life of my son, they can sit down at a table and be civil to each other and start to work something out. I deserve that as a citizen."

== Michael Reinoehl ==
Michael Reinoehl
- Born: Michael Forest Reinoehl; May 17, 1972
- Died: September 3, 2020 (aged 48); Lacey, Washington, U.S.
- Cause of death: Gunshot wound
- Known for: Killing of Aaron Danielson, and subsequent killing by law enforcement, during 2020 Portland George Floyd protests

Michael Forest Reinoehl (May 17, 1972 – September 3, 2020) lived in Clackamas, Oregon, a suburb of Portland, Oregon, and had two children. Reinoehl had described himself as an anti-fascist activist as well as a professional snowboarder and an Army veteran, although an Army spokesperson said there were no records indicating Reinoehl had served in the Army. When his snowboarding career waned, Reinoehl had worked as a construction contractor.

Reinoehl had been estranged from his family in recent years and was reported to have been supporting himself through odd jobs carried out for friends. A snowboarding friend said that Reinoehl had been known for daredevil snowboard stunts in his youth, but that he had been struggling in recent years and had gone through a difficult divorce. Reinoehl's sister described him as "not very stable" to The New York Times and said that his involvement in the Portland protests "made him feel like his existence meant something again."

Reinoehl's social media accounts showed that he had been heavily involved in the protests for three months, helping to provide security. A protest leader said Reinoehl had been trained in de-escalation and was "excellent at that". Another local organizer described Reinoehl as a "guardian angel" for protesters. A protester who had become friends with Reinoehl said: "Nightly, he would break up fights." Reinoehl's social media posts, which had previously been about scenes of snowboarding, nature, and his children, focused "almost exclusively" on the protests in Portland from May 30 onward.

Reinoehl was wanted for failing to appear in court for a June 2020 speed racing case. According to state police, he had raced his 17-year-old son on Interstate 84 at up to 111 mph, with his 11-year-old daughter as a passenger in his car. The car also contained marijuana, pills, and a loaded Glock pistol, for which Reinoehl did not have a license. Reinoehl was arrested for driving under the influence, reckless endangerment of a person and unlawful possession of a firearm. Reinoehl was arrested again in Portland on July 5 for having a loaded gun in public. According to NPR, citing information given by the district attorney's office spokesman, that case was still an ongoing investigation at the time of his death. According to The Oregonian, "the allegations were dropped on July 30 with a 'no complaint,' according to court records. The documents don't indicate why prosecutors decided not to pursue the accusations. Reinoehl spent no time behind bars." Reinoehl was shot and wounded in Portland on July 26 after he intervened in an altercation where one of the participants was armed. On August 7, according to police investigators, Reinoehl sent a text message to his teenage son saying, "Sell me the gun for a quarter pound of weed and $100 I'm getting tired of this shit I need a piece now." Reinoehl was set to be evicted on August 29 after his landlord "apparently noticed six or seven high schoolers smoking marijuana in Reinoehl's apartment." Reinoehl later texted his landlord saying he didn't "have anywhere to go and that the Proud Boys were trying to shoot him." On August 29 "Reinoehl told Yoder that the potential of having the Sheriff's Office evict him was triggering his PTSD. The next night, Aug. 30, police again responded to the house after the other tenants reported it being shot at sometime before 1 p.m."

In a June 2020 Instagram post that was characterized by The New York Times as "laced with violent messages", Reinoehl wrote that he was "100% ANTIFA all the way!" In the same Instagram post, Reinoehl also wrote: "We truly have an opportunity right now to fix everything. But it will be a fight like no other! It will be a war and like all wars there will be casualties." Reinoehl said he was prepared to fight "to change the course of humanity". Reinoehl was not associated with Rose City Antifa or the Portland-based anti-fascist organization Popular Mobilization. In an interview aired by Vice Media, Reinoehl stated: "I felt that my life and other people around me's lives were in danger, and I felt like I had no choice but to do what I did. [...] They want to paint a picture of antifa having major involvement. A lot of people don't understand what antifa represents. And if you just look at the basic definition of it, it's just anti-fascist. And I am 100% anti-fascist. I'm not a member of antifa. I'm not a member of anything. Honestly, I hate to say it, but I see a civil war right around the corner. That shot felt like the beginning of a war." Reinoehl told Vice that he had not turned himself in after the shooting of Danielson because he feared that police were collaborating with right-wing protesters and that he might be killed in custody. Reinoehl told Vice that his home had been shot at and that he was being hunted.

=== Shooting of Reinoehl ===
Reinoehl was charged with second-degree murder and unlawful use of a weapon on September 3, 2020. Agents from the FBI and the U.S. Marshals Service located him in Lacey, Washington, a suburb of Olympia, Washington, and he was shot and killed later that day, between 6:45 and 7:30 p.m., by members of a federal law enforcement task force.

A seven-month inquiry into his death determined "Reinoehl fired first," "that he failed to comply with orders to surrender and was reaching for a gun in his possession when he was shot." Despite this finding, officer reports released after the initial summary reveal that no officers described Reinoehl pointing or firing a weapon towards the officers. Several officers did report him reaching for his waist when the police opened fire.

Members of the task force approached Reinoehl outside an apartment on a residential street as he attempted to enter his car. Lieutenant Ray Brady of the Sheriff's Department in Thurston County stated that four officers fired at Reinoehl outside an apartment after he drew a gun. Brady said he did not believe the involved officers used bodycams or vehicle dashboard cameras during the incident. A statement by the U.S. Marshals Service said that Reinoehl had been armed and threatened the lives of officers. No officers were hurt during the incident.

==== Initial witness reports ====
There were conflicting witness reports immediately after the event:

- One witness was reported as saying she saw Reinoehl fire first. However, according to another account, the same witness said she was not present when the shooting began.
- Another witness told The New York Times that he saw two SUVs approach the area quickly around 6:45 p.m. and then heard gunshots over a period of one and a half minutes. He said that he saw a man next to a white pickup, walking backwards and appearing to hold a gun while officers fired at him.
- Two witnesses working nearby were reported to have said that Reinoehl was in a car outside an apartment complex when two unmarked SUVs converged on Reinoehl's car. Reinoehl then got out of the car and fired 40 to 50 rounds from what appeared to be a semi-automatic rifle at the SUVs before officers returned fire. One of the witnesses later said he and his coworker were misquoted and he was unsure whether Reinoehl had a weapon.
- Another witness said he heard 30–40 gunshots and yet another witness said he heard 8–10.
- On September 9, a resident of the apartment complex where Reinoehl had been staying who witnessed the shooting issued a statement through his attorney, saying that Reinoehl was walking towards his car, holding only a cellphone and eating candy when officers arrived at the scene, and that officers opened fire without any verbal warning. He said that after officers began firing, Reinoehl tried to duck for cover behind his car, which was blocked in by police vehicles. The witness said Reinoehl never got into the car, nor did he ever see Reinoehl hold a weapon or reach for anything while he was being fired at.

==== Statements by officials ====
Law enforcement officials did not state that Reinoehl fired at them before they opened fire but only that he drew a weapon.

On September 17, authorities said that Reinoehl was found to have been armed with a .380 caliber handgun. They further said that a spent shell case of that caliber was found in Reinoehl's vehicle and that a .22 caliber AR-15-style rifle, with its serial number removed, was located in a bag on the vehicle's front seat. According to the official investigators, Reinoehl was first fired on as he was leaving the apartment building. Reinoehl then ran to his station wagon, but he was unable to drive off as the vehicle was boxed in. Reinoehl then attempted to run off and was fired on by officers again. A spokesperson for the Sheriff's Office investigating the shooting said that notwithstanding witness reports saying that Reinoehl had appeared to be holding a rifle, he did not believe Reinoehl had in fact brandished his rifle. Ballistics reports on the handgun would become available in two or three months' time.

Witness video shows officers attempting to perform CPR on Reinoehl. The aftermath of the shooting was recorded on video and posted on the internet.

==== New York Times witness interviews ====
External videos
- "Visual Investigations" video published by The New York Times on October 13, 2020, reconstructing Reinoehl's shooting

According to a report in The New York Times published on October 13, 2020, of 22 people who were near Reinoehl when he was shot, 21 told the Times they did not hear officers issue any commands or identify themselves prior to shooting. Five eyewitnesses said the officers began shooting immediately after arriving on the scene. None of the eyewitnesses interviewed by the Times stated that Reinoehl was holding a weapon. One eyewitness described protecting his eight-year-old child from the gunfire, which he assumed was the work of criminals until he saw the officers' clothing. Overall, four officers fired 37 times on Reinoehl, from rifles and handguns. One of the officers involved said he thought he saw Reinoehl raise a gun inside his vehicle before the first shots were fired, but two others stated they did not. Officers also gave differing statements on whether Reinoehl had pointed a weapon at them later in the street, with one saying he did, and others saying he had only appeared to be trying to "retrieve" a gun from his trouser pocket. An updated statement by the investigators said that officers found a gun in Reinoehl's pocket when they searched his body, and that his hand had been on it when he fell.

As of October 2020, the Thurston County sheriff's department is conducting a criminal homicide investigation into Reinoehl's death.

A review by The New York Times released on April 10, 2021, concluded that local investigators discounted key pieces of evidence that contradicted the notion that Reinoehl fired his weapon; for example, Reinoehl had a full magazine in the gun found on him.

==== Vice report ====
In May 2022 Vice News reported on an extensive collection of documents it was able to review related to the shooting and subsequent investigation, some of which had been redacted, most of which came from the Thurston County sheriff's office. "[They] offer contradictory and troubling information", the site wrote.

A key Marshals witness declined to speak to investigators. Mysterious evidence was sent anonymously to investigators months after the killing. The accounts of law enforcement personnel involved were baffling and at times inconsistent, not always squaring on questions as basic as whether Reinoehl was carrying a rifle or had shot at them. A former combat medic for the U.S. Army who witnessed the killing—and tried to keep children, including his own son, from being shot as police sprayed dozens of bullets—provided an account that countered official narratives, but the lead investigator in the case didn't speak to him for a month and a half after the shooting.

According to Vice, the information in the documents about the vehicle Reinoehl was in, what weapons he had, and who he was traveling with was detailed and accurate enough to support an inference that law enforcement had an informant close to Reinoehl.

The task force that prepared to arrest Reinoehl was hampered in communicating since their radios were not working properly as they had taken them outside the jurisdiction of the local police department that usually used them. The decision to attempt the arrest seemed from the documents to have been taken by two officers who may have reacted to something they heard on the radio. An investigator found upon reviewing the contents of Reinoehl's car a week later that he had a disassembled assault rifle in a backpack in the car. An empty .380 caliber shell casing found in the car was linked to the handgun Reinoehl had on him when he died; this was cited in the documents to support the allegation that he had fired at the police, although the report concedes that there was no way to confirm when it had been fired.

The shell casing seemed from the documents to have been at the center of an evidence tampering investigation conducted by an unnamed outside agency due to conflict of interest issues. Documents related to this were more intensely redacted than the other ones in the file, and indicate that the shell casing's presence was first reported in February 2021, when someone informed the investigators they had it and mailed it somewhere for a detective to pick up. The person who had learned of the casing said they had urged the person they had learned of it from to turn it over to the sheriff's office in October; that person asked them instead to keep it themselves or turn it over to a private investigator. Ultimately the first person advised the second that if they did not turn it over to law enforcement by a certain date the first person would report them for not doing so, which triggered the casing being sent to law enforcement via FedEx with an apparent homemade chain of custody form. The outcome of the investigation was unknown; the documents report that two people never returned calls concerning it.

== Reactions ==
=== Danielson's killing ===
Joe Biden, the Democratic Party's 2020 presidential candidate, released a statement on August 30, the day after the shooting, saying: "The deadly violence we saw overnight in Portland is unacceptable. Shooting in the streets of a great American city is unacceptable. I condemn this violence unequivocally. I condemn violence of every kind by anyone, whether on the left or the right. And I challenge Donald Trump to do the same."

Brian Levin, director of the Center for the Study of Hate and Extremism at the California State University, San Bernardino, commented to Voice of America in an article published on September 1, when investigations were still ongoing, that if Reinoehl was implicated it would mark the first case in recent history of an antifa supporter being charged with homicide. Commenting in the Orange County Register on September 7, Levin said the incident was the "first known killing by an antifa supporter", describing it as "an outlier but also a bellwether. [...] You have a perfect storm in this country with a polarized population, a presidential election, a global pandemic that is frustrating and devastating people, and disinformation and conspiracy theories spreading on social media. The biggest threat is still, far-right white supremacist groups. But you also see that Facebook has become fertile soil for the mushrooming of small groups and lone actors."

In October 2020, Danielson's killing was added to the CSIS terrorism database as a deadly "far-left" attack, the first such incident in over two decades. The killing is also referenced on the Anti-Defamation League's page on antifa, as the only "suspected antifa-related murder" to date; and the New America Foundation's tally of killings during terrorist attacks in the U.S. since 9/11, as the first recorded fatality in a far-left attack, while far right attacks have been regularly recorded for the past 25 years.

Shortly before Reinoehl's death was announced on September 3, President Donald Trump tweeted asking why Portland police had not arrested Danielson's "cold blooded killer", adding that "[e]verybody knows who this thug is. No wonder Portland is going to hell!" In a Facebook Live video broadcast on September 13, Assistant Secretary of Health and Human Services for Public Affairs Michael Caputo described the killing of Danielson as "a drill" for future political violence. In the same broadcast, Caputo espoused several other baseless conspiracy theories about the left's "armed revolt" and left-wing "hit squads."

=== Reinoehl's killing ===
After Reinoehl's killing, hundreds of people protested outside a police station in Portland. A protest organizer who knew Reinoehl said: "If the cops want this to stop, how is coming out here and killing us helping? That's literally why we are out here. They aren't giving us a day in court and are shooting us before asking questions."

Attorney General William Barr described Reinoehl as a "violent agitator" and said "the tracking down of Reinoehl – a dangerous fugitive, admitted Antifa member, and suspected murderer – is a significant accomplishment in the ongoing effort to restore law and order to Portland and other cities." Trump commended Marshals for "strength" and "bravery". On September 12, President Trump said that Reinoehl was "a violent criminal, and the U.S. Marshals killed him. And I will tell you something, that's the way it has to be. There has to be retribution when you have crime like this." Commentators described the statement as appearing to endorse extrajudicial killing. Trump referred to the matter again at a rally on October 15. He criticized Portland Police for letting days pass by without arresting Reinoehl, even though he had been quickly identified on social media, and then stated: "We sent in the U.S. Marshals. It took 15 minutes it was over. Fifteen minutes, it was over. We got him. They knew who he was. They didn't want to arrest him. Fifteen minutes, that ended."

Reinoehl's estranged sister told NPR she was both angry with her brother and sad at his death: "It's awful. This whole thing is awful. There's a lot of people out there who feel like violence is the only solution to fixing things now, people on both sides."

== See also ==
- Violence and controversies during the George Floyd protests
- Terrorism in the United States
- 2019 Tacoma attack
