= Rose City Antifa =

Antifa group founded in 2007 in Portland, Oregon

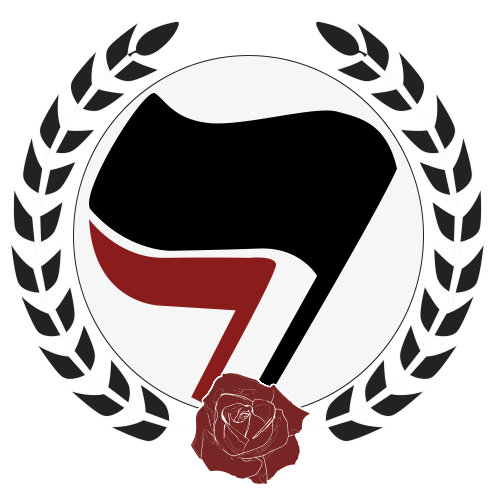
- Logo of Rose City Antifa
- Formation: 2007; 19 years ago
- Founded at: Portland, Oregon, United States
- Affiliations: Anti-Racist Action
- Website: rosecityantifa.org

Rose City Antifa (RCA) is an antifascist group founded in 2007 in Portland, Oregon. A leftist group, it is the oldest known active antifa group in the United States. While anti-fascist activism in the United States dates back to the 1980s, Rose City Antifa is the first to adopt the abbreviated moniker antifa. Since 2016, Rose City Antifa has been one of the nine chapters of the Torch Network coalition.

== History ==
Rose City Antifa was formed in 2007 to coordinate opposition to a music festival that was planned to be held near Portland by neo-Nazis associated with White Aryan Resistance. According to one of its leaders, the group concentrates on "outing" people whom they believe to be neo-Nazis. According to Alexander Reid Ross, the author of the book Against the Fascist Creep, Rose City Antifa grew out of the group Anti-Racist Action (ARA) which first appeared in 1987. Through Rose City Antifa, "the European and American models were sort of synthesized and the current model of Antifa in the US was developed".

Between 2007 and 2013, Rose City Antifa was part of Anti-Racist Action. Since 2016, Rose City Antifa has been part of the Torch Network. In a 2020 interview, RCA activists described the group as having "a strong feminist and queer component", as opposed to a tendency toward toxic masculinity in ARA, and as pursuing tactics going beyond street confrontations with the far right.

Rose City Antifa has campaigned against the white separatist organization Volksfront, the band Death in June, the Ku Klux Klan and the American Renaissance website. The group has organized opposition to Patriot Prayer rallies in Portland. Rose City Antifa clashed with law enforcement officials and supporters of the presidency of Donald Trump following the 2016 United States presidential election. Before a June 2017 rally, the group released a statement saying they would be "unapologetic" over the use of "physical militancy".

In August 2020, RCA and Popular Mobilization organized a counter-protest against the Proud Boys in Portland. In September 2020, RCA published a photograph of Patriot Prayer founder Joey Gibson with Chester Doles, a former Imperial Wizard of the Ku Klux Klan. RCA argues that the Portland Police Bureau tolerates crimes by far-right groups while suppressing protests by left-wing groups.

The group has sought to counter the argument that anti-fascist activism infringes on the freedom of speech of the far right. They have argued that the First Amendment to the United States Constitution "protect[s] citizens from state interference, not from criticism by the public ... we do not have a powerful state apparatus at our disposal ... therefore the concepts of 'censorship' and 'free speech rights' are not in any reasonable way applicable." Rose City Antifa also argues that anti-fascism does not target the speech of the far right, but rather targets its political organizing.

== See also ==
- Antifa (Germany)
- Anti-racism
- Post-World War II anti-fascism
- Iron Front
- Andy Ngo

== Bibliography ==
- Bjelopera, Jerome P. (March 1, 2018). "In Focus Antifa—Background IF10839". Congressional Research Service.
- Bray, Mark (2017). Antifa: The Anti-Fascist Handbook. Brooklyn: Melville House. ISBN 978-1-61219-703-6. OCLC 984595655.
- Coaston, Jane (September 8, 2020). "The pro-Trump, anti-left Patriot Prayer group, explained". Vox.
- Evans, Erica (September 2, 2020). "What is antifa and how does it relate to the season of protests?". Deseret News.
- Flock, Elizabeth (July 25, 2017). "For Trump supporters in Portland, the left is the face of intolerance". PBS.
- Ganim, Sara; Welch, Chris (August 22, 2017). "Unmasking the leftist Antifa movement". CNN.
- Harbager, Molly (5 August 2017). "Antifa, Patriot movement protesters return to Portland waterfront with new tactics". The Oregonian.
- Kavanaugh, Shane (June 5, 2020). "Conservative writer sues Portland antifa group for $900k, claims 'campaign of intimidation and terror'". The Oregonian.
- Mallett, Whitney (May 9, 2017). "California Anti-Fascists Want Racists and the Trump Administration to Be Afraid". Vice.
- Michel, Casey (June 30, 2017). "How Liberal Portland Became America's Most Politically Violent City". Politico.
- Mogelson, Luke (October 25, 2020). "In the Streets with Antifa". The New Yorker.
- Reyes, Lorenzo; Stanglin, Doug (August 23, 2018). "What is antifa and what does the movement want?". USA Today.
- Sacco, Lisa N. (June 9, 2020). "Are Antifa Members Domestic Terrorists? Background on Antifa and Federal Classification of Their Actions InFocus IF10839". Congressional Research Service. Updated June 9, 2020.
- Speri, Alice (March 3, 2021). "Why Did Police Never Solve the Murder of a Prominent Portland Anti-Fascist?". The Intercept.
- Thomas-Peter, Hannah (January 22, 2018). "Fascist fighters or criminals? On the streets with Portland's Antifa group". Sky News.
- Wilson, Jason (May 29, 2017). "Portland knife attack: tension high as 'free speech rally' set for weekend". The Guardian.
