= Andy Ngo =

American right-wing author and influencer (born 1980s)

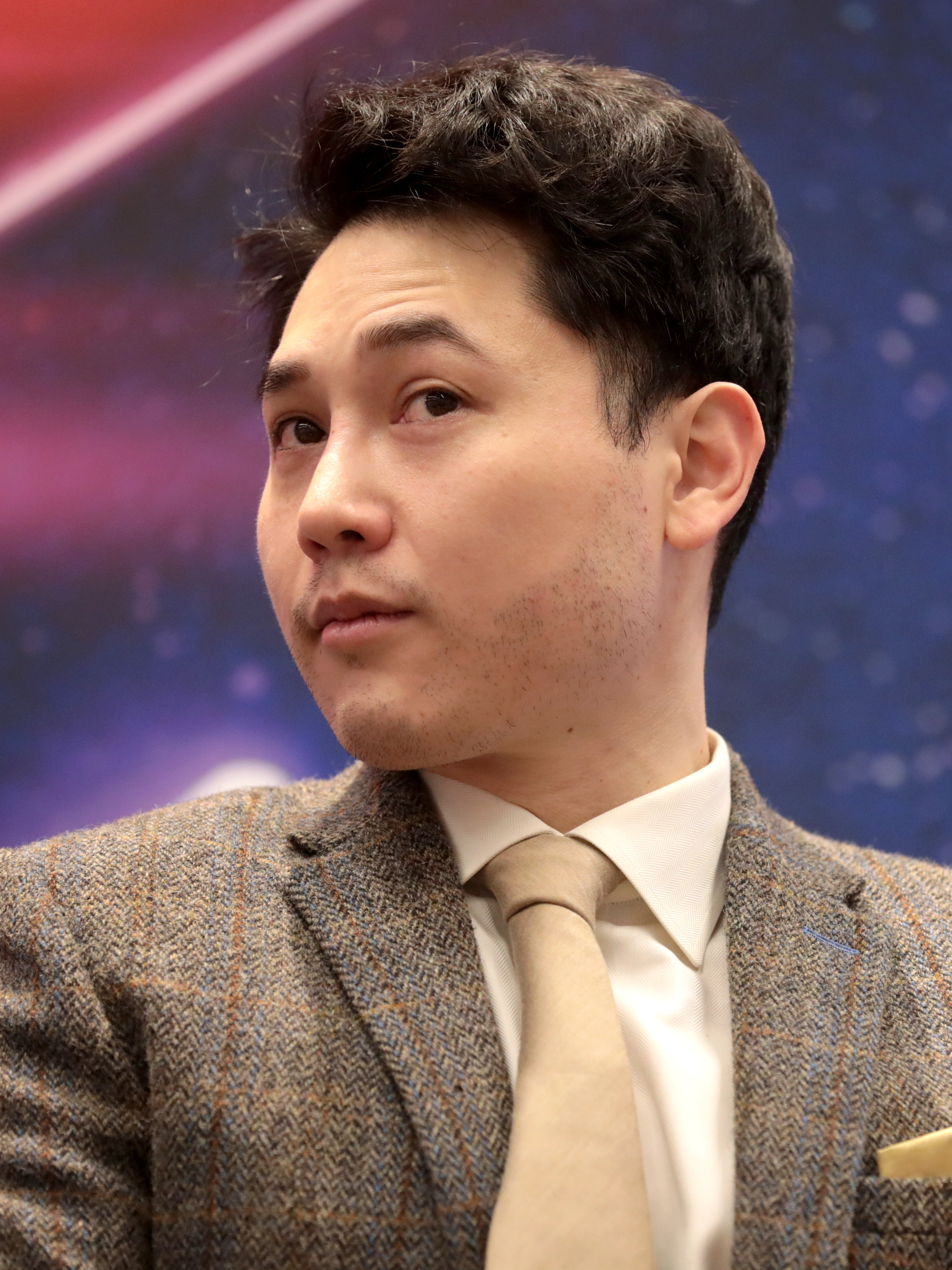
- Ngo in 2022
- Born: Andy Cuong Ngo; 1986 or 1987 (age 39–40); Portland, Oregon, U.S.
- Education: University of California, Los Angeles (BA); Portland State University
- Occupations: Social media influencer; journalist; writer
- Employer: The Post Millennial
- Known for: Coverage of antifa, Muslims, and right-wing politics
- Website: andy-ngo.com

Andy Cuong Ngo (/noʊ/ n-oh; born 1986 or 1987) is an American right-wing social media influencer, who is known for covering and video-recording demonstrators. He is a journalist and editor-at-large for The Post Millennial, a Canadian conservative news website, and a regular guest on Fox News. Ngo has published columns in the New York Post and The Wall Street Journal and authored a best-selling book on antifa.

Ngo's coverage of antifa and Muslims has been controversial, and the accuracy and credibility of his reporting have been disputed by journalists. He has been accused of sharing misleading or selective material, and has been described as a provocateur.

== Early life and education ==
Ngo was born and raised in Portland, Oregon. His parents fled Vietnam in 1978 as Vietnamese boat people. His mother came from an educated middle-class family that ran a jewelry business. His father had been a police officer in a small coastal town in Vietnam. In one interview, he said his parents were forced into labor and re-education camps by the Communist government; in another he said his mother's family were thrown into a labour camp when his mother was 16, while his father's job in the police was "a good job during the war, but one that could easily get you shot afterward." His parents first met amid a six-month stay at a United Nations High Commissioner for Refugees camp near Tanjungpinang, Indonesia, prior to their arrival in the United States in 1979.

Raised in a Buddhist family, Ngo converted to Christianity in high school. After a period of time as an evangelical Christian, he became disillusioned and took an interest in skepticism. He subsequently became an atheist, and was strongly against organized religion, which was reflected in his social media activity in the form of what Ngo later described as "inflammatory language", with Reddit comments such as "Islam needs to be neutered like Christianity". In 2019, Ngo said that his earlier social media activity "represented my simplistic views at the time" and that his comments no longer represented his beliefs.

According to one interviewer, Ngo speaks with trace of an English accent, "developed from living in the UK for several years as a teen". While attending the University of California, Los Angeles (UCLA), Ngo volunteered with AmeriCorps. He graduated from UCLA in 2009 with a graphic design degree. After graduation, he experienced a period of unemployment and worked as a photographer at a used car dealership. In the mid-2010s, Ngo came out as gay while visiting relatives in rural Vietnam. He began volunteering as a photographer at the Center for Inquiry in Portland in 2013.

In 2015, Ngo enrolled in a master's program at Portland State University for political science, with a focus on international relations and comparative politics. While attending the school, he joined the Freethinkers of Portland State University, a student organization that worked closely with professor Peter Boghossian.

== Career ==
=== PSU Vanguard (2016–2017) ===
While enrolled at Portland State University (PSU), Ngo worked as a multimedia editor at the Portland State Vanguard, a student newspaper. In 2016, he reported on a demonstration organized by Don't Shoot Portland in which a man pulled a gun on a crowd of protesters.

In 2017, Ngo drew national attention after he was fired from the Vanguard and accused the newspaper of firing him over his conservative political beliefs. He attended an April 26 interfaith panel at the university, then used his personal account to tweet a video clip of a Muslim student's remarks. In the clip, the student stated: "I can confidently tell you, when the Quran says an innocent life, it means an innocent life, regardless of the faith, the race, like, whatever you can think about as a characteristic. […] This that you're referring to, killing non-Muslims, that is only considered a crime when the country's law, the country is based on Quranic law—that means there is no other law than the Quran. In that case, you're given the liberty to leave the country, I'm not going to sugarcoat it." Alongside the video, Ngo wrote: "At @Portland_State interfaith panel today, the Muslim student speaker said that apostates will be killed or banished in an Islamic state."

Breitbart News picked up and circulated the video within 24 hours of Ngo's posting, which led to a "social media firestorm". Four days later, the Vanguard's editor, Colleen Leary, fired Ngo and stated that he was dismissed because his summary of the Muslim student's remarks reflected a reckless oversimplification and violation of journalistic ethics, and was meant to incite a reaction. She said that the dismissal was "not partisan".

In May 2017, Ngo wrote an op-ed for the National Review on the subject titled "Fired for Reporting the Truth". He also took part in online discussions about the incident on the pro–Donald Trump subreddit r/The Donald, where he called the firing part of a "trend towards self-censorship in the name of political correctness". Leary reported that since the incident did not receive much attention on campus, it left her with questions about the relationship between Breitbart News and Ngo. Ngo has said that he did not contact Breitbart News about his tweet.

=== Campus event coverage (2017–2018) ===
With his student group the Freethinkers of PSU, Ngo helped organize a January 2017 campus event with Dave Rubin, Peter Boghossian, and Christina Hoff Sommers. According to Ngo, Rose City Antifa used social media to launch a phone campaign aimed at administrators in an unsuccessful effort to shut down the event.

Ngo and the Freethinkers of PSU hosted several speakers at a campus event on February 17, 2018, that included the headliner James Damore, a former Google engineer and author of "Google's Ideological Echo Chamber", an internal memo on diversity and gender that the company fired him for after they determined it was discriminatory and had elements that constituted sexual harassment. The day before the event, Ngo wrote an op-ed in The Wall Street Journal in which he stated that there had been threats of violence against the event on Facebook and Twitter, which had led campus police to deny organizers' request for a larger venue to accommodate the expected crowd. During the event, a portion of the audience walked out in protest, and one protester attempted to vandalize the audio system on her way out.

Jason Wilson of The Guardian stated that the Damore event was one of several that appeared to have been "calculated to provoke Portland's progressive activists" and that Ngo's widely circulated videos fit into a pattern of actions where Ngo had "shrewdly inserted" his coverage "into the workings of the rightwing outrage machine" several times within the preceding year. Afterwards, Ngo wrote an article about the incident for Quillette, and the story was covered by YouTuber and political commentator Tim Pool.

As a PSU graduate student, Ngo filmed a talk on March 5, 2018, at Lewis & Clark Law School in Portland by Christina Hoff Sommers, a resident scholar at the American Enterprise Institute known for her criticism of the women's movement. The event was disrupted by student protesters engaging in no platforming tactics, who forced the talk to end early. Ngo posted photos and video clips of students gathering on the stage and drowning out Sommers' talk with chanting and music. Ngo, who had covered protests at several talks given by Sommers, expressed interest in what he called "illiberal reactions" which he said restrict freedom of thought or behavior.

=== Reporting in 2018 ===
On August 29, 2018, Ngo wrote an op-ed titled "A Visit to Islamic England" for The Wall Street Journal. In the article, Ngo described his experiences in two neighborhoods in East London, including visits to a mosque and an Islamic center. From these experiences, he concluded that London was afflicted with "failed multiculturalism". He mistakenly connected alcohol-free zones in parts of London to the Muslim-majority populations, subsequently issuing a correction acknowledging that alcohol-free zones "appear in many English neighborhoods, irrespective of Muslim population."

Ngo's opinion piece was widely said to have been Islamophobic. Alex Lockie from Business Insider criticized Ngo's article for "fear monger[ing] around England's Muslim population" and cherry-picking evidence, and for mischaracterizing the neighborhood near the East London Mosque. Steve Hopkins from HuffPost stated that "some of his [Ngo's] assertions have already been disproved".

In October 2018, Ngo started a podcast entitled Things You Should Ngo. His interviewees included Jordan Peterson, Dave Rubin and Carl Benjamin (who uses the pseudonym "Sargon of Akkad" online).

=== Livestreaming Patriot Prayer rallies (2017–2019) ===
In 2017, Ngo began filming rallies held by Patriot Prayer, a Portland-area far-right group known for holding pro-gun, pro-Trump rallies that have devolved into violence and street fighting. The Patriot Prayer gatherings (whose early rallies were used by white nationalists as recruitment events) were met by Portland's anti-fascists and anarchists known to support direct action, including violence. November 2018, Ngo live-streamed video coverage of the Him Too rally organized by a Patriot Prayer member in downtown Portland, and was sprayed with silly string and harassed by antifa protesters. By 2019, Ngo routinely attended and live-streamed events at Portland protests.

==== May Day 2019 ====
On May 1, 2019, Ngo attended demonstrations and counter-protests in Portland associated with International Workers' Day or May Day. He reported being punched and blasted with bear spray while filming two separate May Day events, including a brawl between left-wing activists and members of Patriot Prayer, outside the Cider Riot pub. Bellingcat stated that Ngo's tweets framed the brawl as an unprovoked assault by anti-fascists.

Prior to the fight, Ngo was filmed standing in the presence of members of Patriot Prayer as they planned an attack on antifascists following the protests. Ngo did not report on the actions of Patriot Prayer. Five members of Patriot Prayer were charged with felony riot incitement for their actions on May Day 2019, including the group's leader Joey Gibson.

==== Assault during coverage of the Proud Boys rally and counter-protest (2019) ====
On June 29, 2019, Ngo covered protests at a rally organized by the far-right group Proud Boys in Portland. A group of counter-protesters also organized, some of whom physically attacked Ngo, who was present filming. Ngo was punched in the head, kicked and hit with at least one milkshake. He blamed his injuries on antifa counter-protesters. No individual attackers were identified. He walked away and reported what happened in a livestream, during which a medic arrived to check on him. The video of the June 29 incident where Ngo was assaulted by masked demonstrators went viral and led the Proud Boys, a group designated as a hate group by the Southern Poverty Law Center, to organize a follow-up event in Portland known as the End Domestic Terrorism rally for August 17, 2019.

As a result of the attack, medical examiners determined that Ngo suffered a subarachnoid hemorrhage. He retained attorney Harmeet Dhillon to investigate the response of the Portland Police Bureau. Following Ngo's attack, Texas Senator Ted Cruz called on federal authorities to investigate Ted Wheeler, Portland's mayor and police commissioner. 2020 Democratic Party presidential candidate Andrew Yang wished Ngo a speedy recovery. Broader analysis of media coverage following Ngo's attack was polarized, with each side expressing criticism of the other, including essays in The Atlantic and Commentary.

On August 21, 2023, Multnomah County Circuit Judge Chanpone Sinlapasai awarded Ngo $300,000 in damages from three defendants who failed to appear in court to contest Ngo's claims.

==== Patriot Prayer video and departure from Quillette (2019) ====
On August 26, 2019, the Portland Mercury reported on a video where Ngo was seen smiling and laughing at certain points while standing in the presence of members of Patriot Prayer on May 1, as they planned an attack on antifascists following the May Day protests. He later followed the group on foot a few blocks to the Cider Riot bar, where Patriot Prayer members attacked the patrons. The video became part of court documents in a lawsuit against Patriot Prayer members for causing the riot. One of the victims of the attack was knocked unconscious with a baton and suffered a broken vertebra; Ngo later posted a video of her being attacked and identified her online. The Portland Mercury's Alex Zilenski stated "there's no way [Ngo] couldn't know the group was planning on instigating violence." The Portland Mercury also quoted an "undercover" antifascist, who went by the pseudonym "Ben" and stated that he was embedded in Patriot Prayer, as saying that Ngo had an "understanding" with the far-right group that the group "protects him and he protects them."

Later during the day on August 26, Ngo's name was deleted from Quillette's masthead, and the site from Ngo's Twitter feed. The editor of Quillette, Claire Lehmann, told The Daily Beast that the two developments were not linked and that Ngo had left the website several weeks earlier. After publication of its story, the Portland Mercury published a letter from Ngo's lawyer seeking retraction of the newspaper's "false and inherently defamatory statements". The Portland Mercury stood by its reporting.

On August 30, The Spectator published an article by Ngo in which he stated he did not know about the far-right group planning the attack, that he "[only] caught snippets of various conversations" and "was preoccupied on [his] phone", describing the accusations as "lies". Writing in the libertarian magazine Reason, Robby Soave expressed agreement that the video did not show evidence that Ngo knew beforehand about a violent plot.

=== Later work (2019–2023) ===
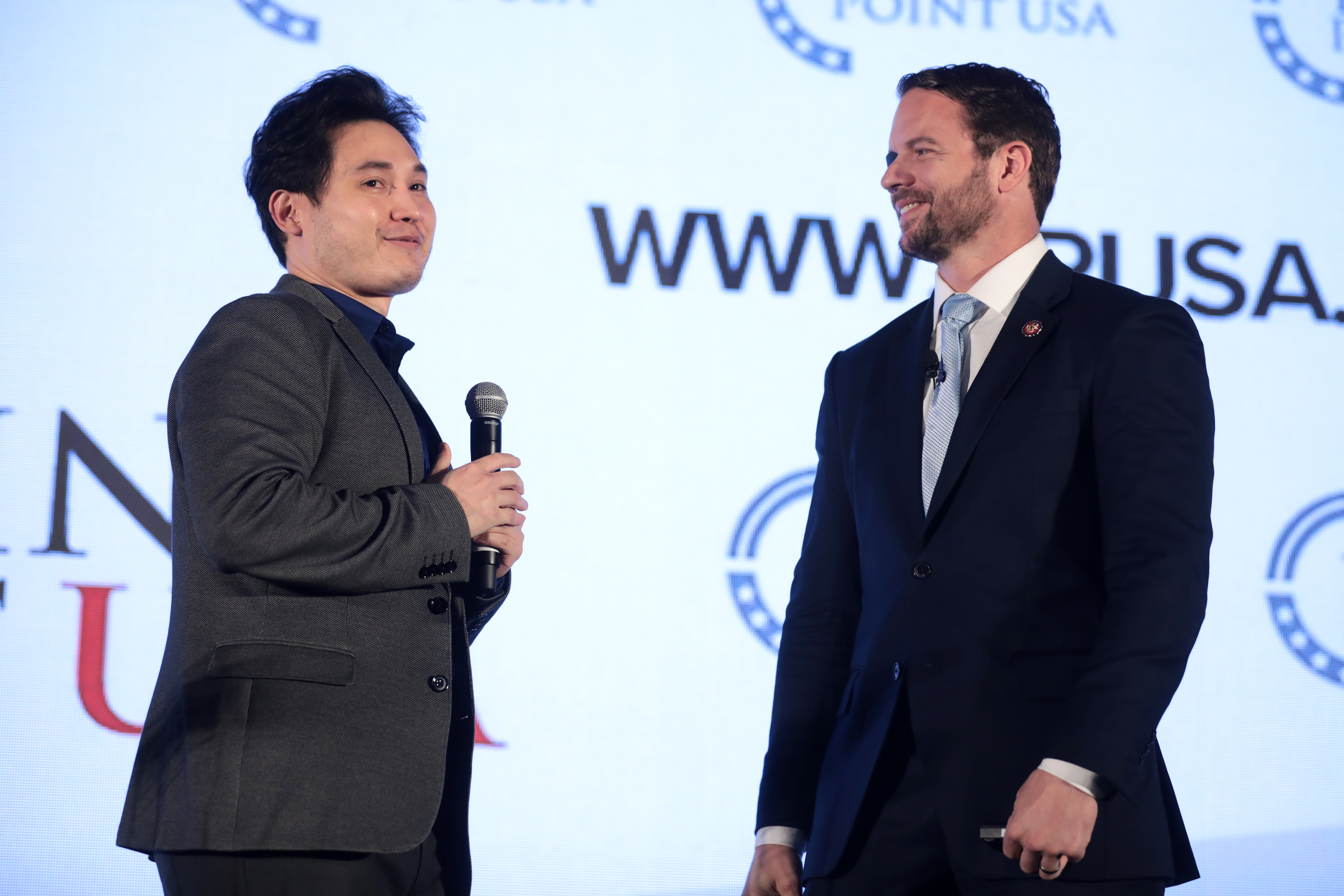
Ngo with U.S. Congressman Dan Crenshaw at a 2019 Turning Point USA event in Washington, D.C.

In 2019, Ngo published a series in the New York Post alleging numerous hate crimes reported to police in Portland, Oregon had been faked. He contributed articles to the online magazine Quillette where he was described as a sub-editor and photojournalist for the publication at the time of his departure in August 2019.

By June 2020, Ngo was with The Post Millennial, a conservative Canadian news website, which continued to retain him as an editor-at-large in June 2024. As of 2020, he was a regular guest on Fox News where he had expressed his concerns about the dangers posed by the left on at least two dozen occasions as of February 2021.

By 2020, Ngo had written several opinion articles for The Wall Street Journal. In July 2020, Ngo's reporting was among the concerns listed in a letter, penned by nearly 300 of The Journal's newsroom staff members to the paper's publisher, that condemned the opinion desk's "lack of fact-checking and transparency". Several media outlets, including The Oregonian have been critical of Ngo and described him as a "right-wing provocateur".

BuzzFeed News said that "Ngo's work is probably best described as media activism" and that he engages in "participant reporting". New York magazine cites Ngo as an example of "busybody journalism". In April 2019, Cathy Young, writing for The Bulwark, criticized Ngo for "outrage mining" after he re-posted various tweets from random Twitter accounts, some of whom were teenagers, that mocked France following the Notre-Dame de Paris fire.

==== Unmasked ====
During the week of January 10, 2021, the online pre-sale of Ngo's first book, Unmasked: Inside Antifa's Radical Plan to Destroy Democracy, was met with a small group of protestors who demonstrated outside the flagship Powell's Books in Portland, Oregon. The bookseller, which offered the book for sale online, chose not to promote Unmasked or physically stock it in their stores. The book became "one of the most popular political titles on Amazon before its release." Upon release, Unmasked became an Amazon bestseller. For the week of February 14, 2021 Unmasked was listed as the top national bestseller in hardcover nonfiction by Publishers Weekly and appeared as number three on The New York Times Best Seller list for nonfiction.

In the Los Angeles Times, journalist Alexander Nazaryan described Unmasked as a "... supremely dishonest new book on the left-wing anti-fascist movement known as antifa". According to Nazaryan, Ngo wrote that his parents' immigration from Vietnam led him to describe his book as "a letter of gratitude to the nation" that made them welcome, as against the leftists who, he claims, wish to destroy it. "As an immigrant from a communist country", Nazaryan wrote, "I understand the sentiment. As a journalist, however, I must point out that he is churning out the very kind [of] propaganda that keeps authoritarians in power." Kirkus Reviews described Unmasked as "a book that belongs in any QAnon subscriber's collection." Writing for The Oregonian, Shane Dixon Kavanaugh stated that Unmasked contained "serious omissions, errors and false equivalencies that have alarmed an array of academics and intelligence officials who track extremist movements."

In March 2021, Winston Marshall, banjoist and founding member of the British folk rock band Mumford & Sons, posted on Twitter to Ngo, "Finally had the time to read your important book. You're a brave man." His post led to online criticism, and several days later Marshall deleted the tweet, apologized for it, and stated that he was temporarily leaving the band "to examine my blindspots." In June, Marshall left Mumford & Sons permanently and recanted his apology, saying that it "participates in the lie that [the extremism documented in the book] does not exist, or worse, is a force for good."

In May 2021, while Ngo was in Portland to cover the one-year anniversary demonstrations for a follow-up chapter to Unmasked, Ngo said he was recognized in disguise and then chased down by a group of five to ten demonstrators who attempted to unmask him before assaulting him. Ngo said that he was tackled and punched by demonstrators in black bloc before he fled into The Nines hotel. Ngo frequently uploads protesters' personal information, including mugshots, to social media: some protesters have said this results in harassment and death threats, leading them to view Ngo as a threat.

== Social media influence ==
Ngo has been variously described as a right-wing activist or influencer, a conservative journalist, writer, and blogger, as well as a far-right content creator, campaigner, and sympathizer. His actions and role in covering issues, particularly civil unrest in Portland, Oregon, following the murder of George Floyd, have received media attention. The Intercept described Ngo as a "far-right Twitter star".

In December 2019, The Oregonian named Ngo one of 2019's Top 15 Newsmakers citing events that included his attack, his surge in prominence within conservative circles, and his circulation of "heavily edited videos of several altercations to his then-270,000 Twitter followers, racking up millions of views online while spreading inaccurate claims and limited context about what transpired." President Trump began to mention Ngo at his rallies in July 2019.

In August 2020, the Southern Poverty Law Center said in an interview with philosopher and How Fascism Works author Jason Stanley that Ngo had been caught misrepresenting facts and that "what he says goes substantially viral after that." Stanley contended that Ngo promotes a "false equivalence [between left and right political violence in the U.S.], when there's no such equivalence at all", noting that hundreds of Americans had been killed in far-right violence since 1990 while antifa had not been responsible for any lives lost as of August 27, 2020, the date the interview was published.

Writing for MIT Technology Review in September 2020, Harvard University faculty member Joan Donovan addressed the use of video in social media to encourage an outrage response, stating that Ngo was one of two right-wing adversarial media-makers promoting "riot porn" consisting of videos of conflict at public protests that are edited, decontextualized, and shared among online followers.

By October 2020, Politico reported Ngo had established approximately 800,000 social media followers and had become a mega influencer that was a "key source for rightwing audiences in search of news about the Black Lives Matter movement". The following month, Ngo's viral video content was recirculated by President Trump following the Million MAGA March.

As of December 2023, Ngo had an X (formerly Twitter) following of over 1.4 million users.

=== Doxxing ===
In 2019, Ngo labelled several journalists, including Shane Burley and Alexander Reid Ross, as "antifa ideologues". Burley and Reid Ross described receiving death threats afterward, with Burley stating to Jacobin that Ngo "appears to target ideological opponents, which can make them fair game for harassment and violent confrontation." According to Vox's Zack Beauchamp, Ngo doxed a political activist in 2019 by publishing her full name. Ngo is known for publishing the mugshots of arrestees in Portland to his Twitter account.

== Credibility ==
Ngo's credibility and objectivity as a journalist have been extensively criticized by other journalists, Since 2019, he has been accused of using selectively edited videos and sharing misleading and inaccurate information to paint antifa activists as violent, and to underplay the violence of the far right, with Columbia Journalism Review describing Ngo as a "discredited provocateur". While under cross-examination during the 2022 trial of a Portland citizen journalist, Ngo acknowledged that his tweets have resulted in threats and violence against those he targets.

Ngo has been accused of having ties to the far-right groups Proud Boys and Patriot Prayer. After Ngo was assaulted by left-wing protestors in Portland in 2019, the Portland-based newspaper Willamette Week quoted the Portland Mercury's Blogtown in saying an unnamed Proud Boys member said that the attack on Ngo "happened because he ignored Proud Boys' offer of protection" and accordingly stated "it is increasingly clear [Ngo] is coordinating his movements and his message with right-wing groups".

BuzzFeed News reported that "[Ngo's] literal brand is that anti-fascists are violent and loathe him", adding that he "has been building to a dramatic confrontation with the Portland far left for months, his star rising along with the severity of the encounters .... [Ngo] is willing to make himself the story and to stream himself doing it. He proceeds from a worldview and seeks to confirm it, without asking to what degree his coverage becomes a self-fulfilling prophecy". Brian Levin, an extremist expert from California State University, San Bernardino, stated that Ngo was "a political pundit who certainly makes the most out of his conflicts, which sometimes turn violent on him. ... But to his credit, I've never seen him be the physical aggressor in the posts that he's made generally."

== Legal actions ==
In June 2020, Ngo sued individuals allegedly associated with antifa, seeking $900,000 in damages for assault and emotional distress, and an injunction to prevent further harassment. The lawsuit cited Rose City Antifa, five other named defendants, and additional unknown assailants. The suit stems from multiple alleged attacks on Ngo in Portland during 2019: at a demonstration on May 1, at his local gym on May 7, and during a protest on June 29. In particular, the suit accuses Rose City Antifa of a "pattern of racketeering activities". On December 15, 2020, a Multnomah County judge denied a special motion to strike down the suit.

In 2021, a Multnomah County grand jury indicted citizen journalist John Hacker on a third-degree robbery charge stemming from a 2019 incident with Ngo. Ngo alleged that Hacker—who was among those named in the June 2020 lawsuit—spilled liquid on him and took his phone at a Portland gym. Hacker was subsequently acquitted of the charge in November 2022.

After five defendants settled, were removed from the case by a judge, or evaded trial entirely, Ngo modified his 2020 civil suit to include an accusation that Hacker and Elizabeth Richter participated in an assault on him at a 2021 rally on the one year anniversary of the murder of George Floyd. Prior to the trial, which took place in early August 2023, attorneys for Hacker and Richter claimed that video evidence would prove that neither touched Ngo that night or participated in beating him. Hacker and Richter were found not liable after their attorney argued they were not among the assailants.

In 2025, Ngo sued Guardian News & Media for defamation over a short music review that referred to him as “alt-right.” He largely prevailed in a preliminary decision, although some issues are set to be resolved at a later trial.

== Congressional testimony ==
Ngo has been invited by Republican lawmakers to testify before Congress on several occasions. On August 4, 2020, he provided testimony at a United States Senate Judiciary subcommittee titled "The Right of the People Peaceably to Assemble: Protecting Speech by Stopping Anarchist Violence." Fox News reported that Ngo disputed media coverage of protests and criticized Democrats for not condemning antifa for violence in Portland; however, prosecutors focused only on criminal conduct and did not provide evidence that any of the people arrested in Portland were linked to antifa. The Southern Poverty Law Center stated that Ngo has been a vocal proponent of listing antifa as a terrorist organization.

On February 24, 2021, Ngo provided testimony at the House Judiciary Subcommittee on Crime, Terrorism and Homeland Security following the U.S. Capitol attack. During the congressional hearing, which focused on the rise of domestic terrorism in the United States, lawmakers denounced the insurrection that left five dead but diverged on how to address the problem. Democratic lawmakers condemned false equivalencies and raised concerns about white supremacist violence and homegrown extremism, whereas Ngo, the sole witness called by Republicans, suggested the media was at fault for failing to criticize the looting and rioting that occurred after the murder of George Floyd.

== Personal life ==
Ngo is gay and considers himself to be politically center-right.

In 2021, The Oregonian reported that Ngo had relocated to London, citing concerns for his personal safety. A Portland Police Bureau spokesman confirmed that Ngo had filed at least 10 police reports about threats made to him or his family since June 2020.

== Works ==
- Ngo, Andy (2021). Unmasked: Inside Antifa's Radical Plan to Destroy Democracy. Nashville, Tennessee: Center Street. ISBN 9781546059585.

== See also ==
- List of LGBT people from Portland, Oregon
