= Portland State Vanguard =

Portland State University student newspaper

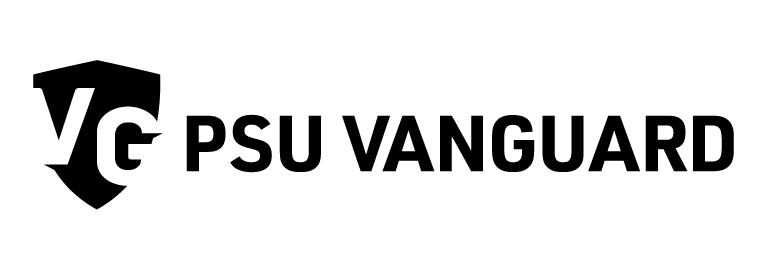
- Type: Student newspaper
- Format: Tabloid
- Publisher: Portland State University Publications Board
- Editor: Noah Carandanis
- Founded: 1946
- Headquarters: Smith Memorial Student Union; 1825 SW Broadway; Portland, Oregon 97201; United States
- Circulation: 5,000
- Website: psuvanguard.com

Portland State Vanguard, formerly known as the Daily Vanguard and Vet's Extended, is an independent student newspaper for Portland State University, in Portland, Oregon, United States.

== Publishing ==
The tabloid format newspaper has a circulation of 5,000, and is distributed for free in and around the Portland State campus area. Until fall 2010 it was published Tuesday through Friday during the academic year, and once a week during the summer. Tuesday, Friday and summer issues were 12 pages, while Wednesday and Thursday issues were eight. As of 2013, the Vanguard publishes once a week on Tuesdays. Exclusively online stories are also released daily. As of 2016–17, the paper is known as the Portland State Vanguard and publishes weekly, every Wednesday.

The Vanguard is composed of four sections: News, Opinion, Arts & Culture and International. The news section provides coverage of significant events relating to the university, administration, student government and the city of Portland. The opinion section offers a variety of views on local and national news and politics and provides a forum of discussion and debate for students and faculty. Arts & Culture covers arts, entertainment and popular culture around campus and Portland. The international section provides coverage of world news and Portland State international and multicultural student organizations and events.

The newspaper's approximately $200,000 annual operating budget is funded in part through student fees and in part through advertising revenue.

The Portland State University Media Board, which consists of four students, four faculty members, and one community member, acts as the Vanguard's publishing body. The board hires the Vanguard's editor-in-chief at the end of each academic year and the remainder of the editorial staff is hired by the editor-in-chief. Editors serve a term of one academic year, beginning and ending in June.

== History ==
Established in 1946, Vanguard was originally the newspaper of the Vanport College Extension in Vanport, Oregon, from which the Vanguard name is derived. The Vanport College Extension relocated to downtown Portland, Oregon after it was destroyed by a flood on May 30, 1948, and eventually became Portland State College before becoming Portland State University.

The newspaper's first issue was published by founding editor Don Carlo, a blind military veteran, on November 16, 1946, under the temporary nameplate Vet's Extended. The first article on the front page was a story covering the student council elections. The first editorial was titled "The Spirit of a Student Body," and declared:

We, as students, are helping to start a new idea for colleges. For it is true that there was no school here before, and it is also true that this organization was only started to alleviate the congestion created by the emergency....and though the only romantic thing around here is the cinder path from Portland to Oregon Halls, we do have the proper shift of....a University. But even without all of the atmospheric attributes, we have within us the insatiable search for knowledge that was born while waiting for the end of the war. Many of us waited years so that we might have an opportunity to attend such a school.

After the alternative names of "Stooge" and "Aspect" were rejected, the name was changed to "Vanguard" beginning January 14, 1947 at the counsel of the paper's first faculty adviser, Vaughn Albertson of the English Department .

The Vanguard originally published weekly on Wednesday afternoons and featured only text. In November 1953, production day was changed to Friday, and the first photograph appeared in the January 28, 1954 edition.

In early 1967, the Vanguard went on strike in objection to salary and budget cuts imposed by faculty members in the dean of students office, which maintained financial control over the paper at that time. In spring term of 1967 the editorial staff announced the paper would not publish until certain conditions were met, including an audit of the paper's finances by an accountant from the college's business office, the positioning of the paper completely under the Publications Board and a demand that the dean of students relinquish all responsibility for all publications. The strike ended after the first week of spring term, with the paper missing only one week of production, and production was then increased to twice-weekly.

A nude Allen Ginsberg on the cover of the Vanguard.

On May 19, 1967 The Vanguard published a nude photograph of beat poet Allen Ginsberg on its front page. The photo prompted college President Branford P. Millar to order that publication of the newspaper be suspended on May 24, 1967, calling the Ginsberg photo "vulgar." The Vanguard published the following Wednesday, May 31, and Friday, June 2, as the Independent Vanguard. The cost of publication was covered by donations from faculty members, whose support was led by Donald R. Moor of the Philosophy Department.

During the 1990–91 academic year, the Vanguard changed its publication schedule from twice-weekly to four days a week.

On October 18, 2005, the Vanguard published an opinion article titled "A city divided: Religious disputes over Jerusalem require diplomacy" by Caelan MacTavish that addressed the religious divide over Jerusalem, the West Bank and the Arab-Israeli conflict. The article immediately attraction the attention of the Committee for Accuracy in Middle East Reporting, and the group contacted the paper to voice its concern and request an apology. By October 27, the article was removed from the Vanguard Web site and replaced it with an editor's note explaining that, after review, the story did not meet the paper's editorial standards.

On October 28, the paper ran an editorial stating that "the column was not given as much editorial attention as it deserved, and realizes in retrospect that the column simply should not have been published....The column neither contributes to educated debate on the subject matter nor provides any insight into the issue that it ostensibly addresses."

By the winter of 2008, the Vanguard was publishing a Twitter feed and maintaining a Facebook site to participate in the expanding trend of social media sites.

== Awards ==
The newspaper and its staff have won several collegiate journalism awards, including the General Excellence Award from the Oregon Newspaper Publishers Association and the Columbia Scholastic Press Association's Gold Circle Award. In 2016, the student staff won five national awards from College Media Business and Advertising Managers. From the Associated Collegiate Press, Vanguard received two national Pacemaker awards in 2019 (1st place in Editorial Cartoon and 5th place in Local Climate Change Reporting and 7th place "Best of Show" for a special edition newspaper in 2018. For 2020 Coronavirus coverage, Vanguard earned a weekly CCC national award as well as a final award from among the weekly winners.

Oregon Newspaper Publishers Association Awards

- General Excellence (2004, 2011, 2014, 2017, 2018, 2019)
- Best Section (2007, 2014, 2017, 2018, 2019, 2020)
- Best Special Section (2009, 2011, 2017, 2018, 2019, 2020)
- Best Headline Writing (2008, 2011, 2018, 2019, 2020)
- Best Writing (2009, 2011, 2014, 2017, 2018, 2019, 2020)
- Best News Story (2004, 2017)
- Best Series (2008, 2017, 2018)
- Best Feature Story (2007, 2009, 2014, 2017, 2018)
- Best Editorial (2004, 2009, 2018, 2020)
- Best Columnist (2007, 2014, 2017, 2018)
- Best Sports Story (2009)
- Best Review (2007, 2008, 2009, 2017, 2018)
- Best Spot News Photo (2009, 2017, 2018, 2019)
- Best Feature Photo (2008, 2017, 2018, 2020)
- Best Photography (2009, 2018, 2019)
- Best Design (2007, 2017, 2018)
- Best Graphic (2007, 2014, 2017, 2018, 2019)
- Best Cartooning (2008, 2018, 2019)
- Best House Ad (2008, 2009, 2017, 2018, 2020)
- Best Web Site (2009, 2014, 2017, 2019)
- College Ad of the Year (2004)

Note: Award listings are missing for years 2005 - 2006, 2010 - 2013, 2015 - 2016.

== Notable alumni ==
- Andy Ngo, Online/Social Media Editor 2015-2016

== See also ==
- List of student newspapers
