= Mark Bray (historian) =

American academic and activist

- Citizenship: American
- Occupation: Associate professor

Academic background
- Education: Rutgers University
- Thesis: The anarchist inquisition: Terrorism and the Ethics of Modernity in Spain, 1893-1909 (2016)
- Doctoral advisor: Temma Kaplan

Academic work
- Discipline: History
- Sub-discipline: Anti-fascism
- Institutions: Rutgers University

Mark Bray is an American activist, historian, and scholar of modern Spain, anarchism, and anti-fascism. He has been a professor of history at Rutgers University since 2019 and previously taught at Dartmouth College.

Bray is the author of Unpunctuated Death Threats: Notes from a Fascist Present, The Anarchist Inquisition, Translating Anarchy, and Antifa: the Anti-Fascist Handbook.

Unpunctuated Death Threats: Notes from a Fascist Present is set to release on January 19, 2027.

== Political activism ==
Bray has organized for the Occupy Wall Street movement. In wake of the 2017 Unite the Right rally, Bray was hosted on a number of news outlets, including NBC and NPR, to comment on the topic of political radicalism. In one instance, he stated that "when pushed, self-defense is a legitimate response to white supremacist and neo-Nazi violence." After he was accused by conservative groups of endorsing violence, Dartmouth College, his employer at the time, disavowed his statement. 100 faculty members came to Bray's defense, writing that Dartmouth officials had allowed his critics to distort his remarks and that Bray had received death threats as a result.

=== Trump's second term ===
After President Donald Trump designated Antifa as a domestic terrorist organization in an Executive Order on September 22, 2025, the Rutgers University chapter of the conservative advocacy organization Turning Point USA (TPUSA) launched a petition on October 2, 2025, calling for the university to fire Rutgers professor Bray, who had published a 2017 book entitled Antifa: The Anti-Fascist Handbook. The petition referred to him as "Dr. Antifa" and called him an "outspoken, well-known antifa member" and "Antifa financier." His home address was published on social media. After receiving death threats, he and his family fled to Spain on October 8, 2025. Their booking for a flight on October 7 was cancelled by unknown persons after they had received their boarding passes and checked their bags.

On October 5, 2025, a petition calling for the dissolution of the Rutgers TPUSA chapter was launched on Change.org which collected thousands of signatures. On October 16, Columbia historians published an op-ed in the Columbia Spectator in support of Bray. Later that October, the Rutgers University Senate passed a resolution in support of Bray by a vote of 110-4 affirming "its strong support for academic freedom and freedom of expression."

== Publications ==
- Opinion published in The Washington Post: "Antifa isn't the problem. Trump's bluster is a distraction from police violence" (June 2020)

== Books ==
=== As author ===
- Translating Anarchy: The Anarchism of Occupy Wall Street (by Mark Bray; Zero Books, 2013)
- Antifa: The Anti-Fascist Handbook (by Mark Bray; Melville House, 2017) ISBN 978-1-61219-703-6
- The Anarchist Inquisition: Assassins, Activists, and Martyrs in Spain and France (by Mark Bray; Cornell University Press, 2022)
- Unpunctuated Death Threats: Notes from a Fascist Present (by Mark Bray; Melville House, 2027)

=== As editor ===
- Anarchist Education and the Modern School: A Francisco Ferrer Reader (edited by Mark Bray and Robert H. Haworth; PM Press, 2018)
