= Ontario Proud =

Canadian conservative political advocacy group

- Founded: February 13, 2016
- Type: Canada Not-for-profit Corporations Act
- Registration no.: 1010260-1
- Location: Toronto, Ontario, Canada
- Product: Soliciting
- Founder: Jeff Ballingall
- Director: Nicolas Spoke
- Director: Ryan O'Connor
- Website: www.ontarioproud.ca

Ontario Proud is a right-wing Facebook viral meme-maker, political advocacy group, and third-party advertiser. It was founded by Jeff Ballingall in 2016 as a Facebook page, and is funded by large real estate developers and construction companies. Ontario Proud offices are located at 36 King Street East in Toronto, Ontario, Canada.

== Leadership ==
Ontario Proud was founded by Jeff Ballingall, a former political staffer who previously worked for Sun News Network. Ballingall worked in the administration of Conservative Prime Minister Stephen Harper, working as a video specialist for the Conservative Caucus and as a communications manager for Jim Prentice. Jeff Ballingall is also the founder of Mobilize Media Group LTD. which promotes media for Ontario Proud. As of August 2018, he has been one-third owner of The Nectarine, a digital news platform. Ballingall also is the Chief Marketing Officer of The Post Millennial, a conservative-leaning Montreal-based online news website. The director is currently Ryan O’Connor. Nicolas Spoke is also a current company officer.

== Activities ==
Ontario Proud was active during the 2018 Ontario provincial elections, attacking liberal Premier Kathleen Wynne, later shifting its focus to NDP candidate Andrea Horwath as the NDP rose in the polls. The group spent approximately $60,000 on television ads and engaged in door-to-door canvassing. The group is reportedly very active in social media marketing, particularly on Facebook, where it used microtargeting. Ontario Proud may have helped defeat Kathleen Wynne’s Liberal government in Ontario. In the lead up to the election, Ballingall boasted that “Ontario Proud's Facebook content was viewed almost 67 million times — more interactions than the Facebook pages of the three main parties, their leaders, the unions and all other political advocacy groups combined.” Ontario Proud has been criticized for blocking users who comment on their Facebook page in support of NDP or Liberal candidates. Ontario Proud has also frequently threatened legal action against critics.

The group has announced its intentions to target Prime Minister Justin Trudeau going forward. Jeff Ballingall established a similar "BC Proud" Facebook page to target elections in British Columbia, and is attempting to start another site to target Quebec. Sister pages have also been established in Alberta and New Brunswick. When iPolitics noticed it was sharing negative posts of Conservative leader Andrew Scheer after the 2019 election, Ballingall reaffirmed the page's opposition to Justin Trudeau. He founded Conservative Victory, a non-profit campaign for advocating Andrew Scheer's removal as Conservative Party leader and having a leadership race, with Kory Teneycke and John Reynolds. They claimed victory after Scheer resigned. Stephen Maher interpreted the group as "astroturf-y in nature".

== Financing ==
According to Ontario Proud, it is financed by donations from approximately 1,300 Canadian donors, however most of the groups funding is reveal to have come from out of province, and mostly from construction companies with little or no labour laws. In June 2017, founder Jeff Ballingall stated that Ontario Proud had cost $5,000 to that point. By April 2018, Ontario Proud was appealing for funding from various business groups including members of the Ontario General Contractors Association (OGCA). A cached copy of the fundraising appeal that was posted on the OGCA website showed that Ontario Proud was looking for up to $700,000 to fully fund its election strategy. While the OGCA encourages its members to be politically active, a spokesperson for the organization stated that OCGA itself has never donated to Ontario Proud.

On December 11, 2018, financial disclosures showed that, of the over half million dollars of funding that Ontario Proud had received, the majority ($460,000) had come from corporate donations. Out of the corporate donations, over 89 percent of them came from companies involved in the land-development and construction industries. The five largest donations were from: Mattamy Homes ($100,000), Merit Ontario ($50,000), Nashville Developments ($50,000), Opportunities Asia Ltd. ($30,000), and Shiplake Properties Limited ($25,000). Seventeen other companies, mostly related to housing development, also donated $10,000 each. As of February 2021, Mattamy Homes, published this statement on their website: “we regret having made a one-time donation to Ontario Proud in the ... 2018 provincial election. At the time, we believed Ontario Proud was a credible advocate for advancing the province’s housing agenda, specifically in relation to housing availability & affordability.”
