= The Post Millennial =

Canadian conservative online news magazine

- Type: Online news magazine
- Owner: JTN Network
- Founders: Matthew Azrieli; Ali Taghva
- Editor: Elizabeth Emmons
- Founded: 2017; 9 years ago
- Language: English
- Headquarters: Montreal, Quebec, Canada
- Website: thepostmillennial.com

The Post Millennial is a Canadian conservative online news magazine. Founded in 2017, it publishes both Canadian and American news. It is owned by JTN Network, the parent company of Just the News.

== History ==
The Post Millennial was founded in August 2017 by Matthew Azrieli and Ali Taghva with Madison Hofmeester. Azrieli is the grandson of the billionaire Canadian-Israeli real estate developer David Azrieli. Taghva is an Iran-born blockchain developer, who used social media to coordinate a student protest against the Ontario Secondary School Teachers' Federation over the Putting Students First Act while at Richmond Green Secondary School in 2012. Hofmeester worked as a SEO consultant. The trio also founded the short-lived conservative news website The Nectarine in 2018 with Jeff Ballingall, who was then a political campaigner for Ontario Premier Doug Ford through his advertising group Ontario Proud. According to Taghva, the two websites shared "back-end resources".

The site's Facebook presence expanded rapidly between June 2018 and May 2019, with page interactions growing from 36,000 to 194,000 per month. By January 2019, the website was receiving up to 200,000 monthly visits per Similarweb data. Meanwhile, a new office was sited in Montreal, and the organization planned for another expansion into Toronto in 2020. In May 2019, Jeff Ballingall was hired as the company's Chief Marketing Officer. He was credited by Taghva with leading the successful Conservative Party of Canada leadership election campaign of Erin O'Toole in August 2020. A media study by Canada's National Observer found that 8 per cent of Conservative respondents read The Post Millennial.

In mid-2020, Taghva left his position as editor-in-chief to build a cybersecurity company.

In early 2022, The Post Millennial was ranked 23rd among Canadian media outlets by audience size, with an average of 1,968,000 unique monthly visits between January and March 2021 per Similarweb, but it did not meet Comscore's minimum reporting standard.

As of 2024, the website was described as far-right by the Southern Poverty Law Center and Media Matters for America.

== Ownership and revenue ==
The website was initially owned by the Montreal-based The Post Millennial Corporation. It was criticised for the lack of transparency about its ties to Conservative Party politicians.

In mid-2019, in announcing its hiring of Ballingall as executive, The Post Millennial said it was funded by "private investors". According to Taghva, the site was receiving revenue from consulting clients and through paid subscriptions or advertisements; it did not reveal the number of subscribers and displayed no ads. After securing a buyer for The Post Millennial in 2022 and announcing his own departure, Azrieli stated he had self-funded the website.

In May 2022, the Human Events Media Group announced that it had acquired The Post Millennial. The Human Events Media Group also owns Human Events, an American conservative publication founded in 1944 that went online-only in 2013.

In November 2025, JTN Network, the parent company of Just the News, announced that it had acquired The Post Millennial and Human Events. The company announced it planned to expand The Post Millennial by shifting its focus to a younger demographic.

== Content ==
The Post Millennial provides both national and regional news. It runs stories on politics and culture. Its opinion section is a significant portion of its content, and conservative figures such as Barbara Kay have written opinions for the outlet. According to a CBC report published in 2019, much of the news content provided by The Post Millennial is reused from other media outlets with no additional reporting. In an interview for Rebel News in 2020, Ali Taghva said the website had been intended as a media outlet delivering unedited stories that would "speak for themselves". Harvard University's project on The Future of Media categorises it as "an alternative news and opinion website".

In July 2020, after Black Lives Matter protester Garrett Foster was fatally shot in Austin, Texas, The Post Millennial falsely claimed that Foster had fired shots at a civilian vehicle. In fact, Foster had not fired any shots before he was killed. The Post Millennial later issued a correction, but continued to blame Foster for the death; The Daily Dot described the episode as an example of how "disinformation circulated by fringe groups to support their preferred narrative—that Black Lives Matter protesters are violent and lawless—works its way into the conservative media ecosystem and up to the White House." An analysis by Politico and the Institute for Strategic Dialogue on media in the lead-up to the 2020 presidential election in the United States found that the most prominent figures claiming violence by Black Lives Matter and claiming fraudulent ballots, James O'Keefe and Turning Point USA, were posted by The Post Millennial.

In July 2020, The Daily Beast exposed an online network pushing United Arab Emirates propaganda against Qatar, Turkey, and Iran using op-eds placed in news outlets using fictitious authors. The Post Millennial published one of these articles under the fake persona "Joseph Labba". In response, The Post Millennial said that: "It appears we were caught up in an operation involving false identities that involved 46 other outlets including The Washington Examiner and The Hill Times... The submission was evaluated by a member of our editorial team and deemed to be a meritorious submission... [and] a well-written, well-reasoned opinion piece about an important issue... We stand by the decision to run it and we will be putting the piece back up shortly under The Post Millennial's byline."

Many articles published by the website use aggregated content from other news sources, social media sites, and press releases with "inflammatory headlines"; the latter has been described as rage bait— for far-right accounts and pages on social media websites.

In 2021, The Post Millennial played a key role in creating a viral narrative falsely claiming that some members of the U.S. women's national soccer team had disrespected a 98-year-old World War II veteran when he played the "Star-Spangled Banner" prior to a game. The claim was false (the players in fact turned towards a U.S. flag while he played), but the story nevertheless went viral in right-wing media). After the story had been corrected by other media outlets, The Post Millennial changed its story to include a quote from player Carli Lloyd: "We turned because we faced the flag."

In August 2021, amid the COVID-19 pandemic, The Post Millennial ran a story implying that unvaccinated high school students in the Eatonville, Washington public school system were forced to wear ankle monitors; in fact, the devices were proximity monitors that do not track location, were worn by both vaccinated and unvaccinated students (as well as staff), and were required only while participating in high and moderate contact indoor sports. The devices were similar to those in use by the NFL, NBA, and Major League Baseball. After being contacted, The Post Millennial updated its headline but added no correction.

=== Staff ===
Andy Ngo has been editor-at-large since late 2019. Ngo was previously with Quillette. Several advertisers such as Logitech pulled ads from the site due to its association with Ngo.

Yaakov Pollak, a former provincial Conservative Party candidate, joined the media group in July 2019. Pollak ran a variety of Conservative Party-affiliated Facebook pages, including "Liberty Now" and "Elect Conservatives" pages. Pollak did not declare his connection to these pages; until he was contacted by interested media groups, the majority of content on those pages was sourced from The Post Millennial.

The Post Millennial employed Cosmin Dzsurdzsa as among its first hires from late 2018; he wrote over 500 articles for the site. In August 2019, after the National Observer asked The Post Millennial about Dzsurdzsa's previous articles published in Russia Insider and his work for Free Bird Media, sites known for pro-Kremlin propaganda and white supremacist commentary, respectively, the publication parted ways with Dzsurdzsa.
