= Rowan Scarborough =

American journalist

Rowan Scarborough is an American journalist. For two decades, Scarborough worked as a Washington Times reporter who wrote a weekly column with fellow reporter Bill Gertz called "Inside the Ring", reporting on national security and defense issues. Starting in February 2007, he worked at the Washington Examiner as its national security correspondent for a few months, before returning to the Times. Scarborough also writes freelance articles on national security issues for Human Events and other publications.

Scarborough's books include the 2004 book Rumsfeld's War: The Untold Story of America's Anti-Terrorist Commander about the tenure of former Defense Secretary Donald Rumsfeld in the Bush administration. On July 16, 2007, Regnery Publishing released his second book, Sabotage: America's Enemies Within the CIA, which claims that anti-Bush elements within the CIA leaked information to the media and hampered the Afghanistan and Iraq war efforts.

He graduated summa cum laude from the School of Journalism at the University of Maryland. He served in the United States Navy as a Hospital Corpsman. In 2003, Scarborough was a Hoover Institution Media Fellow.

He has had to publish an apology for falsely claiming that facial recognition technology had identified antifa activists amongst the pro-Trump 2021 Capitol building insurrection mob. Before the retraction, this false claim was spread widely including by Fox News host Laura Ingraham and was shared by Rep. Matt Gaetz (R-FL) on the floor of Congress.

== Works ==
- Scarborough, Rowan (2004). Rumsfeld's war : the untold story of America's anti-terrorist commander. Washington, D.C.: Regnery Publishing. ISBN 0-89526-069-7.
- Scarborough, Rowan (2007). Sabotage : America's enemies within the CIA. Washington, D.C.: Regnery Publishing. ISBN 978-1-59698-510-0.

== See also ==
- Antifa (United States) § Hoaxes and conspiracy theories
