= Antifa (United States) =

Anti-fascist political activist movement

- Symbol commonly used by antifa depicting an anarchist flag overlaying a red flag, based on the logo of the German antifa movement
- Preceded by: Anti-Racist Action
- Ideology: Anti-fascism; Anti-racism
- Political position: Left-wing
- Methods: Community organizing Digital activism Direct action Doxing; Harassment; Mutual aid Picketing; Political violence Protest marching
- Status: Active (since 2007)

Antifa (/ænˈtiːfə, ˈæntifə/) is a left-wing anti-fascist and anti-racist political movement. It is a highly decentralized array of autonomous groups in the United States. Antifa political activism includes nonviolent methods of direct action such as poster and flyer campaigns, mutual aid, speeches, protest marches, community organizing and digital activism. Some others use tactics like doxing, harassment, violence, and property damage. Supporters of the movement aim to counter far-right extremists, including neo-Nazis and white supremacists.

Individuals involved in the movement subscribe to a range of left-wing ideologies, and tend to hold anti-authoritarian, anti-capitalist, and anti-state views. A majority of individuals involved are anarchists, communists, and socialists, although some social democrats also participate in the antifa movement. The name antifa and the logo with two flags representing anarchism and communism are derived from the German antifa movement. Dartmouth College historian Mark Bray, author of Antifa: The Anti-Fascist Handbook, credits Anti-Racist Action (ARA) as the precursor of modern antifa groups in the United States.

The American antifa movement grew after Donald Trump was elected president of the United States in 2016. Antifa activists' actions have since received support and criticism from various organizations and pundits. Some on the political left and some civil rights organizations criticize antifa's willingness to adopt violent tactics, which they describe as counterproductive and dangerous, arguing that these tactics embolden the political right and their allies. Both Democratic and Republican politicians have condemned violence from antifa. Many right-wing politicians and groups have characterized antifa as a domestic terrorist organization, or use antifa as a catch-all term, which they adopt for any left-leaning or liberal protest actions. According to some scholars, antifa is a legitimate response to the rise of the far right. Scholars tend to reject an equivalence between antifa and right-wing extremism. Some research suggests that most antifa action is nonviolent.

Various right-wing groups and individuals have made numerous efforts to discredit antifa. Some have been social media hoaxes, many false flag operations by alt-right and 4chan users posing as antifa backers on Twitter; some hoaxes have been picked up and portrayed as fact by right-leaning media and politicians. On September 22, 2025, Trump signed an executive order intended to designate antifa as a domestic terrorist organization, after repeated calls by Trump and William Barr to do so. Academics, legal experts, and others have argued such an action exceeds the authority of the presidency and violates the First Amendment. Several analyses, reports, and studies have concluded that antifa is not a major domestic terrorism risk.

== Definition ==
The English word antifa is a loanword from the German Antifa, where it is a shortened form of the word antifaschistisch ("anti-fascist") and a nickname of Antifaschistische Aktion (1932–1933), a short-lived group which inspired the wider antifa movement in Germany. The German word Antifa first appeared in 1930. The long form antifaschistisch was borrowed from the original Italian anti-Fascisti ("anti-fascists"). Oxford Dictionaries placed antifa on its shortlist for word of the year in 2017 and stated the word "emerged from relative obscurity to become an established part of the English lexicon over the course of 2017." The pronunciation of the word in English is not settled as it may be stressed on either the first or the second syllable.

According to the Anti-Defamation League (ADL) the term antifa "is often misapplied to include all counter-protesters", and that "violence perpetrated by anarchists or other unrelated actors is often misattributed to antifa supporters". During the first Trump administration, the term antifa became "a conservative catch-all" term as Donald Trump, officials in his administration, his supporters, and right-wing commentators applied the label to all sorts of left-leaning or liberal protest actions. Conservative writers such as L. Brent Bozell III associated the tactics of Black Lives Matter with those of antifa.

In 2020, Politico reported that "the term [antifa] is a potent one for conservatives" because "[i]t's the violent distillation of everything they fear could come to pass in an all-out culture war. And it's a quick way to brand part of the opposition." Alexander Reid Ross, who teaches at Portland State University, argues that the popularization of the term antifa was a reaction to the popularization of the term alt-right, "to the point where [antifa] simply describes people who are anti-fascist or people who are against racism and are willing to protest against it."

== Movement structure and ideology ==
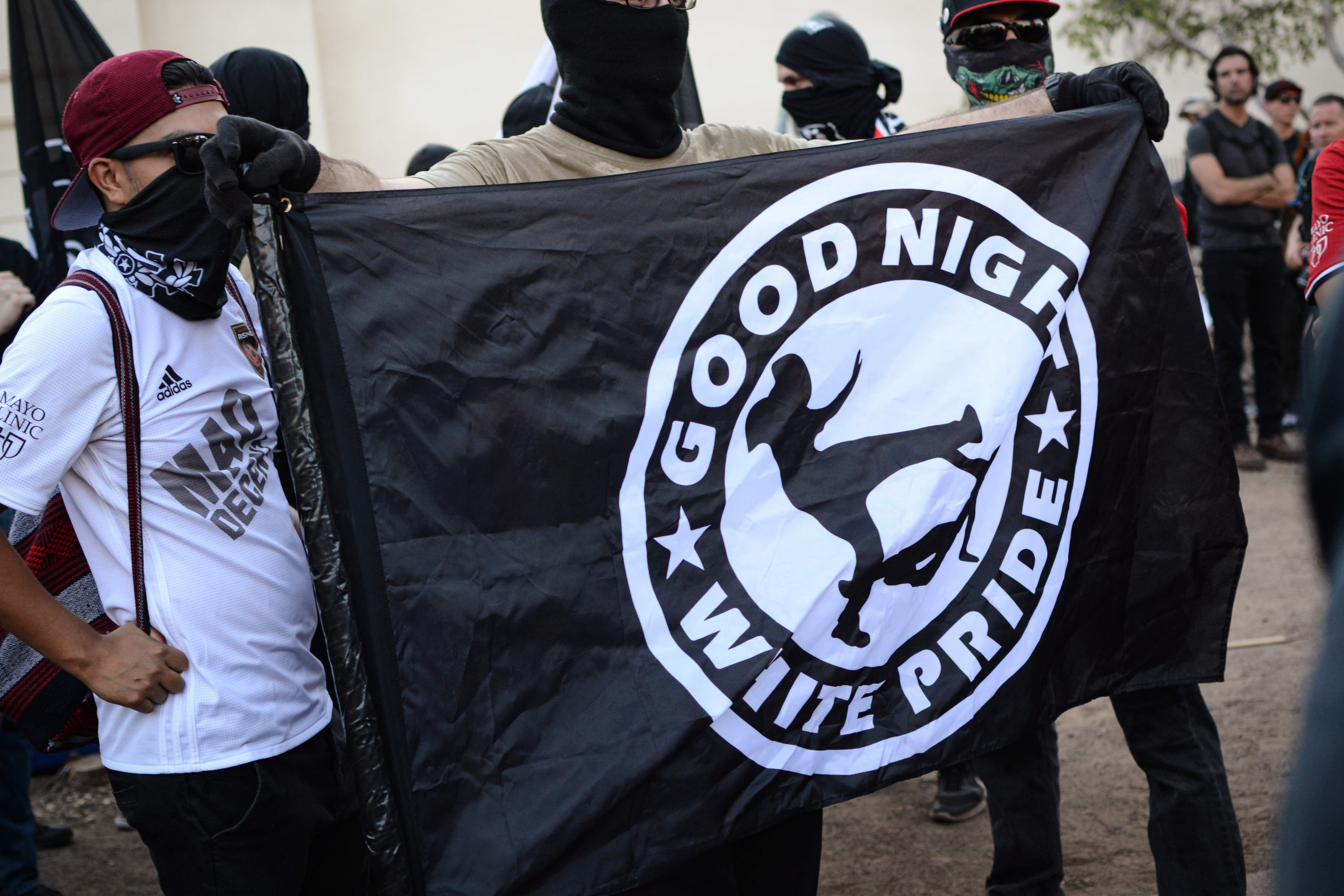
Antifa with a banner reading "good night white pride", 2017

Antifa is not a unified organization but rather a movement without a hierarchical leadership structure, comprising multiple autonomous groups and individuals. The movement is loosely affiliated, and has no chain of command, with antifa groups instead sharing "resources and information about far-right activity across regional and national borders through loosely knit networks and informal relationships of trust and solidarity." According to Mark Bray, "members [of antifa groups] hide their political activities from law enforcement and the far right" and "concerns about infiltration and high expectations of commitment keep the sizes of groups rather small."

Bray adds that "[i]t's important to understand that antifa politics, and antifa's methods, are designed to stop white supremacists, fascists, and neo-Nazis as easily as possible." According to research by both Bray and scholar Stanislav Vysotsky, antifa methods are mostly nonviolent; analysis by the Anti-Defamation League has reached the same conclusion. According to Bray, "they function in some ways like private investigators; they track neo-Nazi organizing across multiple social-media platforms." In regard to doxing, Bray says that it is about "telling people that they have a Nazi living down the street, or telling employers that they're employing white supremacists", adding that "after Charlottesville, a lot of the repercussions that these khaki-wearing, tiki-torch white supremacists faced were their employers firing them and their families repudiating what they do."

Activists typically organize protests via social media and through websites. Some activists have built peer-to-peer networks, or use encrypted-texting services like Signal. In 2017, Chauncey Devega of Salon described antifa as an organizing strategy, not a group of people. According to a member of a New York City antifa group, their group's identification research on whether an individual or group is "fascist, Alt Right, White Nationalist, etc." is "based on which groups they are a part of and endorse". While noting that "Nazis, fascists, white nationalists, anti-Semites and Islamophobes" are specific overlapping categories, the main focus is "on groups and individuals which endorse, or work directly in alliance with, white supremacists and white separatists. We try to be very clear and precise with how we use these terms."

According to terrorism experts Colin Clarke and Michael Kenney in 2020, writing in War on the Rocks, direct actions such as anti-Trump protests, demonstrations against the alt-right provocateur Milo Yiannopoulos and the clash with neo-Nazis and white supremacists at the Unite the Right rally "reflects many Antifa supporters' belief that Trump is a fascist demagogue who threatens the existence of America's pluralistic, multi-racial democracy. This factor helps explain why such Antifa supporters are so quick to label the president's 'Make America Great Again' supporters as fascists — and why Trump is so quick to label Antifa as a terrorist organization."

The antifa movement grew after the 2016 United States presidential election. As of August 2017, approximately 200 groups existed, of varying sizes and levels of activity. It is particularly active in the Pacific Northwest, such as in Portland, Oregon. Individuals involved in the antifa movement tend to hold anti-authoritarian, anti-capitalist, anti-fascist, anti-racist, and anti-state views, subscribing to a varied range of left-wing ideologies. A majority of adherents are anarchists, communists, and other socialists who describe themselves as revolutionaries, although some social democrats and others on the American Left, among them environmentalists, LGBT and indigenous rights advocates, also adhere to the antifa movement.

According to professor of journalism and political science at the Craig Newmark Graduate School of Journalism at the City University of New York, Peter Beinart in 2017, "antifa is heavily composed of anarchists" and "its activists place little faith in the state, which they consider complicit in fascism and racism." Antifa activists' ideologies, as well as their involvement in violent actions against far-right opponents and the police has led some scholars and news media to characterize the movement as far-left, as well as militant.

In his 2017 article "The Rise of the Violent Left" for The Atlantic, Beinart writes that antifa activists "prefer direct action: They pressure venues to deny white supremacists space to meet. They pressure employers to fire them and landlords to evict them. And when people they deem racists and fascists manage to assemble, antifa's partisans try to break up their gatherings, including by force." According to historian Mark Bray, an expert on the movement, the "vast majority of anti-fascist organizing is nonviolent. But their willingness to physically defend themselves and others from white supremacist violence and preemptively shut down fascist organizing efforts before they turn deadly distinguishes them from liberal anti-racists."

Described as a pan-leftist and non-hierarchical movement, antifa is united by opposition to right-wing extremism and white supremacy. Antifa activists reject both conservative and liberal anti-fascism. The antifa movement generally eschews mainstream liberal democracy, having "an illiberal disdain for the confines of mainstream politics", and favoring direct action over electoral politics. Bray states that "[t]he vast majority of antifa militants are radical anti-capitalists who oppose the Democratic Party" and that Democratic Party leaders, including Nancy Pelosi and Joe Biden, have condemned antifa and political violence more broadly.

Despite antifa's opposition to the Democratic Party and liberalism, some right-wing commentators have accused their adherents of being aided by "liberal sympathizers", or of being "affiliated with the Democratic Party", as well as being "a single organization", "funded by liberal financiers like George Soros", "mastermind[ing] violence at Black Lives Matter protests", and that "Antifascists are the 'real fascists'", with Bray citing these as examples of five myths about antifa.

The ADL states that "[m]ost antifa come from the anarchist movement or from the far left, though since the 2016 presidential election, some people with more mainstream political backgrounds have also joined their ranks." Similarly, Bray argues that "[i]t's also important to remember that these are self-described revolutionaries. They're anarchists and communists who are way outside the traditional conservative-liberal spectrum." ABC News notes that "[w]hile antifa's political leanings are often described as 'far-left,' experts say members' radical views vary and can intersect with communism, socialism and anarchism."

According to CNN, "Antifa is short for anti-fascists. The term is used to define a broad group of people whose political beliefs lean toward the left -- often the far left -- but do not conform with the Democratic Party platform." The BBC notes that, "as their name indicates, Antifa focuses more on fighting far-right ideology than encouraging pro-left policy." Beinart argues that the 2016 election of Donald Trump vitalized the antifa movement and some on the mainstream left were more willing to support them as a tactical opposition.

== History ==
=== Background ===
The logo of Antifaschistische Aktion, the militant anti-fascist network in 1930s Germany that inspired the antifa movement

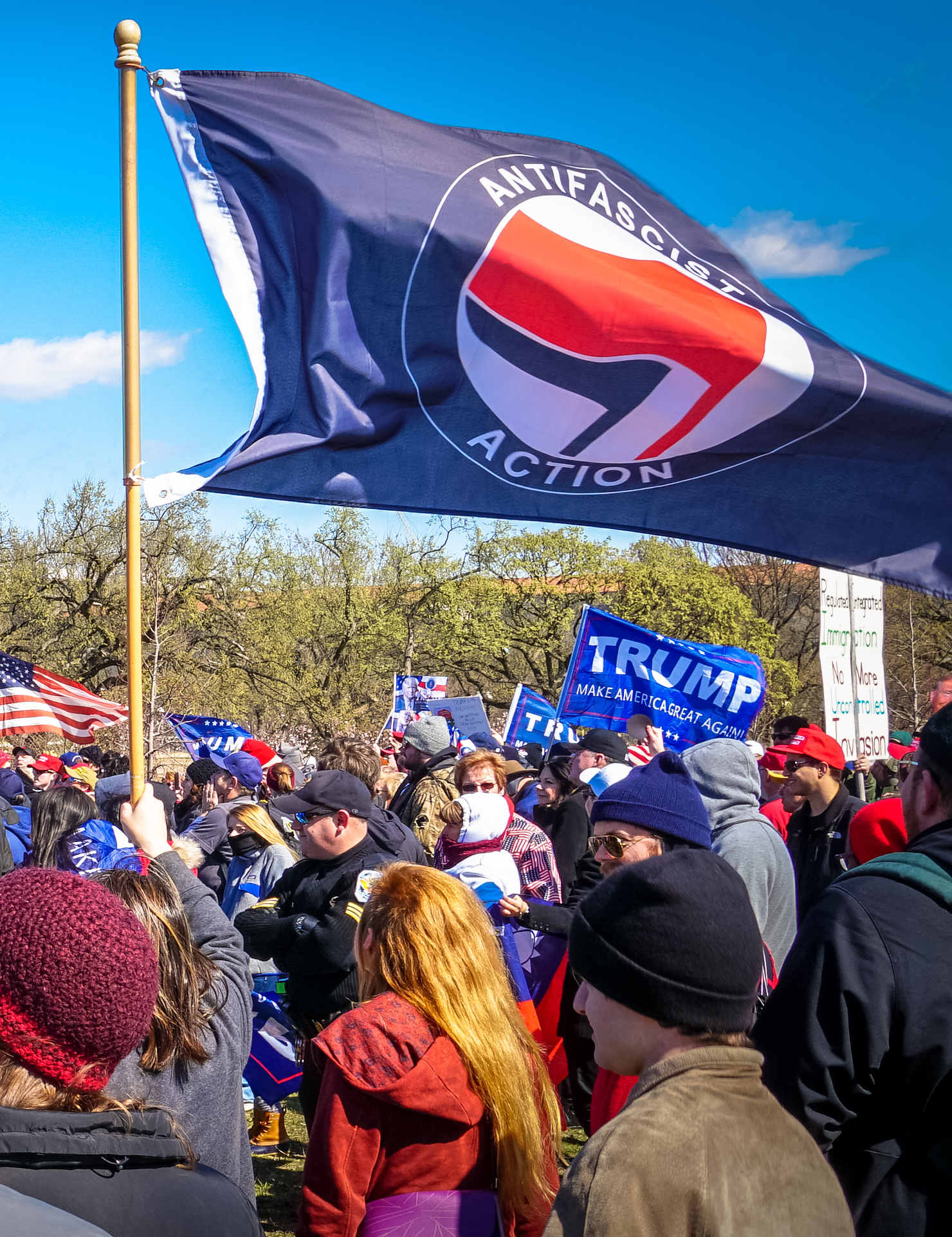
A variant of the logo on a flag held by a counter-protester at one of the several March 4 Trump demonstrations in Washington, D.C. in 2017

When Italian dictator Benito Mussolini consolidated power under his National Fascist Party in the mid-1920s, an oppositional anti-fascist movement surfaced both in Italy and countries such as the United States. Many anti-fascist leaders in the United States were anarchist, socialist, and syndicalist émigrés from Italy with experience in labor organizing and militancy. Ideologically, antifa in the United States sees itself as the successor to anti-Nazi activists of the 1930s. European activist groups that originally organized to oppose World War II-era fascist dictatorships re-emerged in the 1970s and 1980s to oppose white supremacy and skinheads, eventually spreading to the United States.

Modern antifa politics can be traced to opposition to the infiltration of Britain's punk scene by white power skinheads in the 1970s and 1980s, and the emergence of neo-Nazism in Germany following the fall of the Berlin Wall. In Germany, young leftists, including anarchists and punk fans, renewed the practice of street-level anti-fascism. Peter Beinart writes that "[i]n the late '80s, left-wing punk fans in the United States began following suit, though they initially called their groups Anti-Racist Action, on the theory that Americans would be more familiar with fighting racism than they would be with fighting fascism."

Dartmouth College historian Mark Bray, author of Antifa: The Anti-Fascist Handbook, credits Anti-Racist Action (ARA) as the precursor of modern antifa groups in the United States. In the late 1980s and 1990s, ARA activists toured with popular punk rock and skinhead bands in order to prevent Klansmen, neo-Nazis and other assorted white supremacists from recruiting. Their motto was "We go where they go", by which they meant that they would confront far-right activists in concerts and actively remove their materials from public places. In 2002, ARA disrupted a speech in Pennsylvania by Matthew F. Hale, the head of the white supremacist group World Church of the Creator, resulting in a fight and 25 arrests.

In 2007, Rose City Antifa, likely the first group to utilize the name antifa, was formed in Portland, Oregon by former ARA members. Other antifa groups in the United States have other genealogies. In Minneapolis, Minnesota, a group called the Baldies was formed in 1987 with the intent to fight neo-Nazi groups directly. In 2013, the "most radical" chapters of ARA formed the Torch Antifa Network, which has chapters throughout the United States. Other antifa groups are a part of different associations such as NYC Antifa or operate independently.

=== Activities ===
In a 2017 interview, Brian Levin, director of the Center for the Study of Hate and Extremism at the California State University, San Bernardino, said antifa activists feel the need to participate in violent actions because "they believe that elites are controlling the government and the media. So they need to make a statement head-on against the people who they regard as racist." In 2017, historian Mark Bray wrote that the adherents "reject turning to the police or the state to halt the advance of white supremacy. Instead they advocate popular opposition to fascism as we witnessed in Charlottesville." The idea of direct action is central to the antifa movement.

Scott Crow, a self-declared former antifa organizer, told an interviewer: "The idea in Antifa is that we go where they (right-wingers) go. That hate speech is not free speech. That if you are endangering people with what you say and the actions that are behind them, then you do not have the right to do that. And so we go to cause conflict, to shut them down where they are, because we don't believe that Nazis or fascists of any stripe should have a mouthpiece." A manual posted on It's Going Down, an anarchist website, warns against accepting "people who just want to fight". Furthermore, the website notes that "physically confronting and defending against fascists is a necessary part of anti-fascist work, but is not the only or even necessarily the most important part."

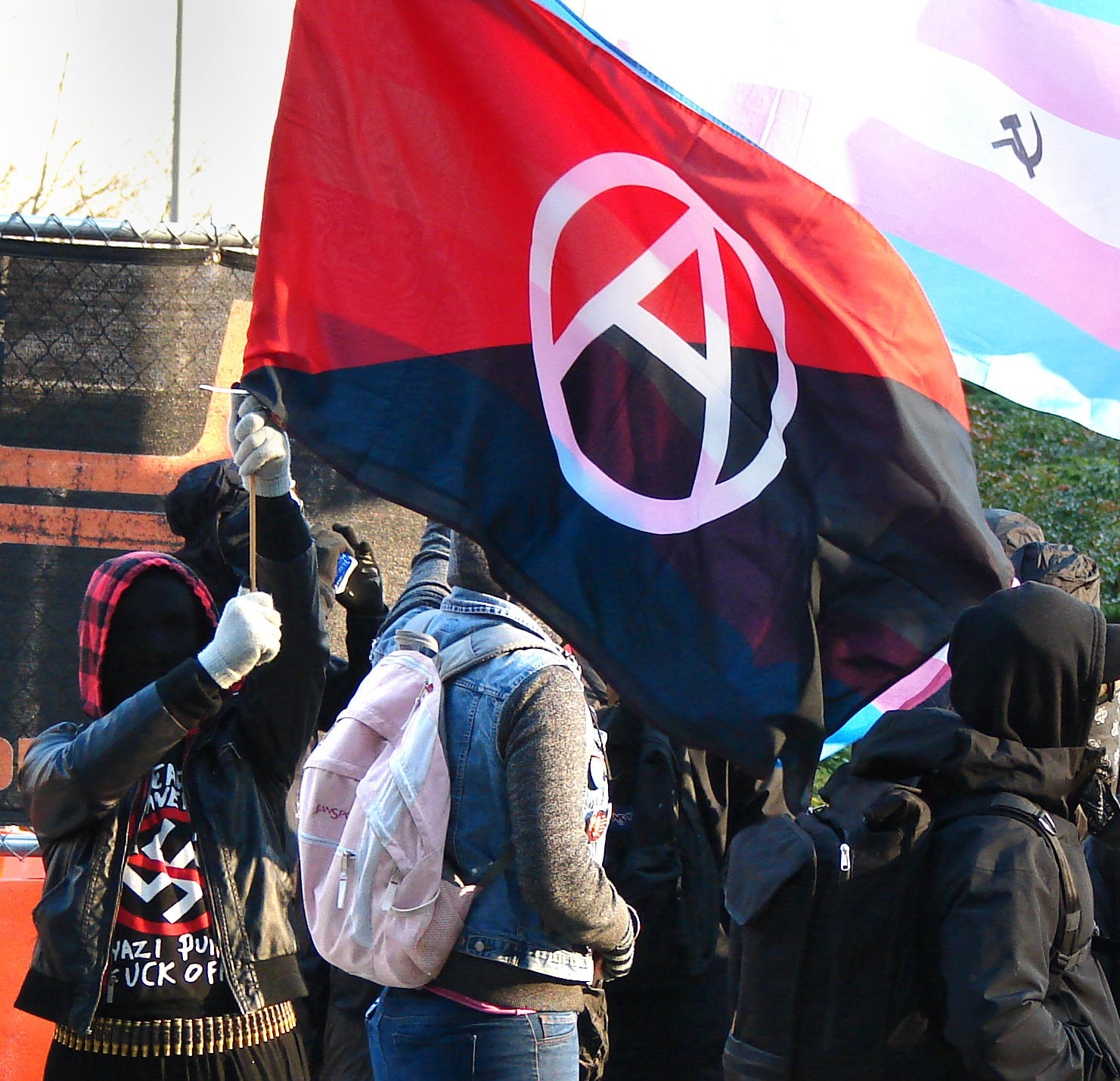
Antifascist activists with a modified anarchist red and black flag and a transgender pride flag containing the hammer and sickle in a 2017 protest

According to Beinart, antifa activists "try to publicly identify white supremacists and get them fired from their jobs and evicted from their apartments" and also "disrupt white-supremacist rallies, including by force." According to a book review in The Washington Post, "Antifa tactics include 'no platforming,' i.e. denying their targets the opportunity to speak out in public; obstructing their events and defacing their propaganda; and, when antifa activists deem it necessary, deploying violence to deter them." According to National Public Radio, antifa's "approach is confrontational" and "people who speak for the Antifa movement acknowledge they sometimes carry clubs and sticks."

CNN describes antifa as "known for causing damage to property during protests." Scott Crow says that antifa adherents believe that property destruction does not "equate to violence". According to the Los Angeles Times, antifa protesters have engaged in "mob violence, attacking a small showing of supporters of President Trump and others they accused, sometimes inaccurately, of being white supremacists or Nazis." Antifa activists also used clubs and dyed liquids against white supremacists in Charlottesville.

Media have reported on specific instances of antifa protesters harassing or attacking journalists or causing damage to their equipment, while they were documenting protests — namely reporters of The Washington Post, a contributor to Vice and Reuters, and others. According to The Kansas City Star, police asked persons carrying firearms (including both antifa members and members of the far-right militia movement group Three Percenters) at a September 2017 rally in Kansas City to remove ammunition from their weapons.

Apart from the other activities, antifa activists engage in mutual aid such as disaster response in the case of Hurricane Harvey. According to Natasha Lennard in The Nation, antifa groups as of January 2017 were working with interfaith groups and churches "to create a New Sanctuary Movement, continuing and expanding a 40-year-old practice of providing spaces for refugees and immigrants."

Antifa activists often use the black bloc tactic in which people dress in black and cover their faces in order to thwart surveillance and create a sense of equality and solidarity among participants. Antifa activists wear masks to hide their "identity from protestors on the other side (who might dox people they disagree with) or from police and cameras" and for philosophical reasons such as the beliefs that "hierarchies are bad and that remaining anonymous helps keep one's ego in check." Joseph Bernstein from BuzzFeed News says that antifa activists also wear masks because "they fear retribution from the far right and the cops, whom they believe are sympathetic if not outright supportive to fascists."

When antifa became prominent in the news during the George Floyd protests and was accused of being responsible for much of the violence, a report in Vox stated that "[m]embers of antifa groups do more conventional activism, flyer campaigns, and community organizing, on behalf of anti-racist and anti-white nationalist causes", quoting Mark Bray as saying that this was the "vast majority" of what they did. In July 2020, The Guardian reported that "a California-based organizer and anti-fascist activist" stated she saw "Trump's claims about antifa violence, particularly during the George Floyd protests, as a message to his 'hardcore' supporters that it was appropriate to attack people who came out to protest." In August 2020, many small business owners interviewed by The New York Times in what was the Capitol Hill Autonomous Zone in Seattle blamed people they identified as antifa for much of the violence and intimidation of their patrons while distinguishing antifa from Black Lives Matter.

=== Notable actions ===
Along with black bloc activists, antifa groups were among those who protested the 2016 election of Donald Trump. The emergence of antifa in modern conservative political discourse in the US dates back to Donald Trump's first inauguration on January 20, 2017, when white supremacist Richard B. Spencer was punched in the face by a masked protester. Antifa activists also participated in the February 2017 Berkeley protests against alt-right provocateur speaker Milo Yiannopoulos, where antifa gained mainstream attention, with media reporting antifa protesters "throwing Molotov cocktails and smashing windows" and causing $100,000 worth of damage.

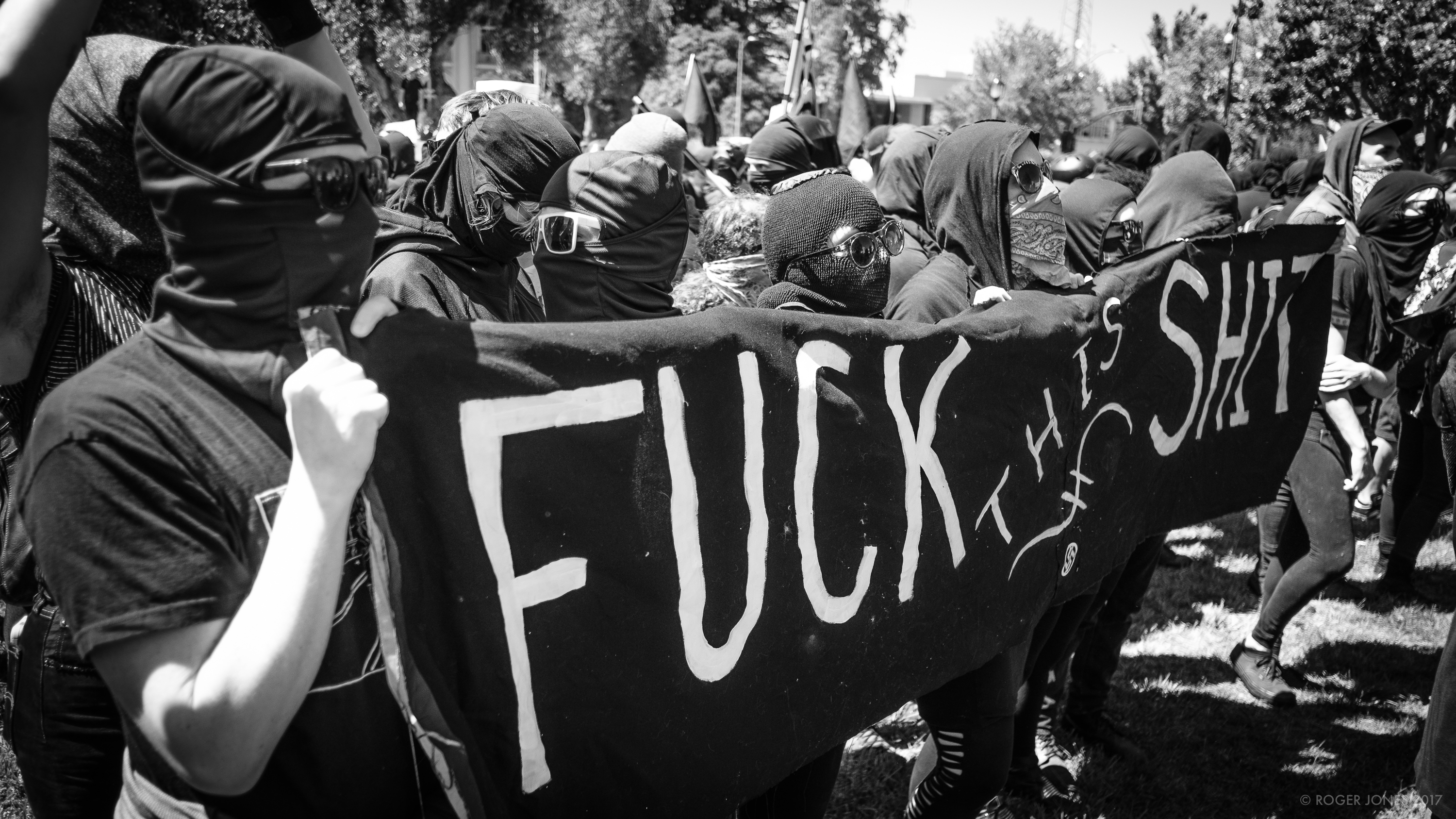
An antifa rally at Berkeley protests, August 2017

In August 2017, antifa counter-protesters at the Unite the Right rally in Charlottesville, Virginia, reported The New York Times, "used clubs and dyed liquids against the white supremacists." Groups preparing to protest the Boston Free Speech Rally saw their plans become viral following the violence in Charlottesville. The event drew a largely peaceful crowd of 40,000 counter-protesters. In The Atlantic, McKay Coppins stated that the 33 people arrested for violent incidents were "mostly egged on by the minority of 'Antifa' agitators in the crowd."

During the Berkeley protests on August 27, 2017, an estimated one hundred antifa and anarchist protesters joined a crowd of 2,000–4,000 other protesters to confront alt-right demonstrators and Trump supporters who showed up for a "Say No to Marxism" rally that had been cancelled by organizers due to security concerns. Following the incident, Jesse Arreguin, the mayor of Berkeley, suggested classifying the city's antifa as a gang.

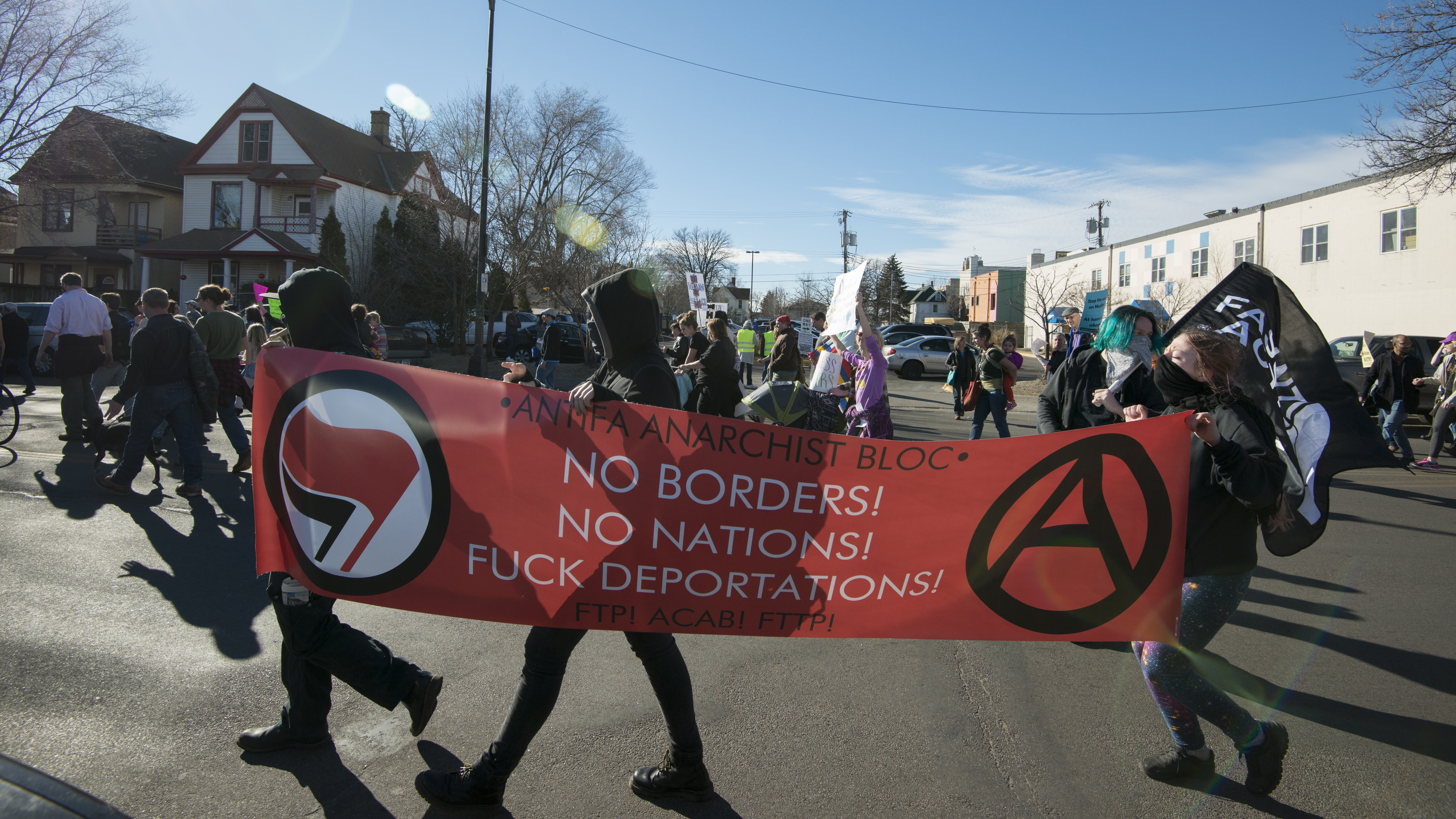
Protesters hold an antifa banner in Minneapolis, February 2017.

In November 2018, police investigated a left-wing group associated with antifa, Smash Racism D.C., following a protest by 12-20 people outside the home of The Daily Caller founder Tucker Carlson, who they accused of being a racist and white supremacist. Activists of the group defaced the driveway of Carlson's property by spray-painting an anarchist symbol on it.

In January 2021, about 100 Proud Boys and Trump supporters clashed with counter-protesters for hours on Mission Boulevard near the Crystal Pier. Violent acts committed by members of both sides were posted to social media. In 2022, 11 people, who were later identified by prosecutor Summer Stephan as Antifa, were charged with felonies related to the incident. In April 2024, nine of those charged had pled guilty to various charges while two chose to go to trial. On May 3, these two were convicted of conspiracy to commit a riot. In June 2024, eight of those who were convicted received sentences ranging from 180 days in jail to eight years in prison. Patrick Cotter, a former federal prosecutor described by USA today as an expert, described the trial as selective prosecution, highlighting video evidence of Proud Boy violence and described the trial as "an insult to public intelligence."

==== 2025 Alvarado, Texas, protest and shooting ====
On July 4, 2025, a small group of Dallas-area left-wing activists staged a protest they characterized as a noise demonstration outside the Immigration and Customs Enforcement (ICE) Prairieland Detention Center in Alvarado, Texas, setting off fireworks outside detention center buildings and committing acts of vandalism. When a responding Alvarado police officer pointed his pistol at two people running away from him, one of the protesters fired eleven rifle shots; one shot struck the officer above his collarbone, causing non-life-threatening injuries. The officer returned fire as the protesters scattered and fled. Within days, eleven were arrested, including most of those who had been present at the center; within a month, the alleged gunman was arrested after a manhunt, along with five other alleged accessories who had not been present.

After the September 2025 assassination of Charlie Kirk, Trump signed NSPM-7, a memo directing the US Department of Justice (DOJ) to "disband and uproot networks" such as antifa, and the DOJ began a deliberate effort to investigate left-wing groups. A short time later, the DOJ filed terrorism-related charges against several Prairieland defendants, alleging that the protest was staged by an "antifa cell", and that the fireworks and vandalism were a ploy designed to draw out police before conducting a rifle attack. Officials said the case is the first time terrorism charges have been used against individuals for antifa activities. Five pleaded guilty in November 2025 to charges of providing material support to terrorists.

Commentators with The Intercept and Truthout criticized the government for arresting and charging an alleged accessory for transporting anarchist literature, arguing that that this could create a precedent for prosecuting people exercising free speech rights who are associated to alleged antifa actions. The protesters and their supporters dispute their alleged ties to antifa and said that they were attending a peaceful protest. At the federal trial, two defendants who cooperated with the prosecution disclaimed earlier statements saying the others were part of antifa; one of the pair testified that she had not understood what "antifa cell" meant when she signed a guilty plea that used the term.

On March 13, 2026, eight protesters including the gunman were convicted by a Texas jury of providing material support to terrorists, the gunman was convicted of the attempted murder of a police officer, and a ninth person was convicted of tampering with evidence. Eight of the convicts were later sentenced to 30 to 100 years of prison. The Intercept described the two Republican-appointed judges as choosing "to make an example of the defendants", while The New York Times noted that the sentences were "significantly longer than the lengthiest sentence handed down... [for] joining in the attack on the Capitol on Jan. 6, 2021."

== Public reactions ==
=== Academics, scholars, and activists ===
Historian Mark Bray, who has studied the antifa movement, stated in 2017 that "[g]iven the historical and current threat that white supremacist and fascist groups pose, it's clear to me that organized, collective self-defense is not only a legitimate response, but lamentably an all-too-necessary response to this threat on too many occasions." In 2017, Alexander Reid Ross, a lecturer in geography and an author on the contemporary right, argued that antifa groups represented "one of the best models for channeling the popular reflexes and spontaneous movements towards confronting fascism in organized and focused ways."

In 2017, historian and Dissent magazine editor Michael Kazin wrote that "[n]on-leftists often see the left as a disruptive, lawless force. Violence tends to confirm that view." In 2019, Historian Ruth Ben-Ghiat was "worried that antifa's methods could feed into what she said were false equivalencies that seek to lump violence on the left with attacks by the right." Ben-Ghiat argued that "[t]hrowing a milkshake is not equivalent to killing someone, but because the people in power are allied with the right, any provocation, any dissent against right-wing violence, backfires", with the effect that "[m]ilitancy on the left" can "become a justification for those in power and allies on the right to crack down" on the left.

In 2017, Peter Beinart, a professor of journalism and political science, wrote that "[a]ntifa believes it is pursuing the opposite of authoritarianism. Many of its activists oppose the very notion of a centralized state. But in the name of protecting the vulnerable, antifascists have granted themselves the authority to decide which Americans may publicly assemble and which may not. That authority rests on no democratic foundation. [...] The people preventing Republicans from safely assembling on the streets of Portland may consider themselves fierce opponents of the authoritarianism growing on the American right. In truth, however, they are its unlikeliest allies." Anti-racist public intellectual Cornel West, who attended a counter-protest to the Unite the Right rally, said in a 2017 interview that "we would have been crushed like cockroaches if it were not for the anarchists and the anti-fascists", describing a situation where a group of 20 counter-protesters were surrounded by marchers whom he described as "neofascists".

In 2017, veteran radical activist Noam Chomsky described antifa as "a major gift to the right", arguing that "the movement was self-destructive and constituted a tiny faction on the periphery of the left." Eleanor Penny, an author on fascism and the far right, argued against Chomsky that "physical resistance has time and again protected local populations from racist violence, and prevented a gathering caucus of fascists from making further inroads into mainstream politics". Natasha Lennard has argued against Chomsky and others, citing Richard B. Spencer's suspension of his college tour in March 2018, as "a sharp rebuttal to the glut of claims that antifa practices serve as a gift to the far right."

=== Civil rights organizations ===
In 2020, the ADL said that while there have been hundreds of murders by far-right groups in the last few decades, there has only been one suspected antifa-related murder. When Trump threatened to designate antifa as a domestic terrorist organization in 2020, the Southern Poverty Law Center (SPLC), called this dangerous and a threat to civil liberties. The SPLC also reported that antifa members "have been involved in skirmishes and property crimes, 'but the threat of lethal violence pales in comparison to that posed by far-right extremists.'"

=== Law enforcement and officials ===
In June 2017, the antifa movement was linked to "anarchist extremism" by the New Jersey Office of Homeland Security and Preparedness. This assessment was replaced with one in 2019 which states that "Antifa is a movement that focuses on issues involving racism, sexism, and anti-Semitism, as well as other perceived injustices. The majority of Antifa members do not promote or endorse violence; however, the movement consists of anarchist extremists and other individuals who seek to carry out acts of violence in order to forward their respective agendas." In September 2017, Politico obtained confidential documents and interviews indicating that the Department of Homeland Security (DHS) and the Federal Bureau of Investigation (FBI) believed that "anarchist extremists" were the primary instigators of violence at public rallies against a range of targets in April 2016.

In July 2020, FBI Director Christopher A. Wray, who had stated in a press release on June 4 that "anarchists like Antifa" are "exploiting this situation to pursue violent, extremist agendas", (Note: For the press release, see Wray, Christopher A. (June 4, 2020). "FBI Director Christopher Wray's Remarks at Press Conference Regarding Civil Unrest in Wake of George Floyd's Death" (Press release). Federal Bureau of Investigation. Archived from the original on June 24, 2020.) testified to the Senate Judiciary Committee that the agency "considers antifa more of an ideology than an organization" which was later reiterated the same year in a September 17 remark to lawmakers. This contradicted President Trump's remarks about antifa and put Wray at odds with the Trump administration. According to the Associated Press, Wray "did not dispute that antifa activists were a serious concern", stating that antifa was a "real thing" and that the FBI had undertaken "any number of properly predicated investigations into what we would describe as violent anarchist extremists", including into individuals who identify with antifa, whom the FBI identified as "a movement or an ideology" rather than as "a group or an organization". Wray stated that "racially motivated violent extremists, such as white supremacists, have been responsible for the most lethal attacks in the U.S. in recent years", although "this year the most lethal violence has come from anti-government activists, such as anarchists and militia-types." In August 2020, three DHS draft reports did not mention antifa as a domestic terrorism risk and ranked white supremacy as the top risk, higher than that of foreign terrorist groups.

=== Members of Congress ===
Republican lawmakers have since made efforts to pass legislation against antifa since 2017, including the unsuccessful Unmasking Antifa Act of 2018 introduced by Dan Donovan and an unsuccessful resolution introduced Bill Cassidy and Ted Cruz in 2019. In 2020, FBI Director Christopher A. Wray told the House Committee on Homeland Security that antifa is "not a group or an organization. It’s a movement or an ideology."

On August 29, 2017, Nancy Pelosi, then House Minority Leader for the Democratic Party, condemned the violence of antifa activists in Berkeley. In July 2019, Republican Senators Bill Cassidy and Ted Cruz introduced a nonbinding resolution that would designate antifa a domestic terrorist organization. In June 2020, Republican Senator Tom Cotton advocated using military force to quell nationwide protests against police brutality and racism, calling for the 101st Airborne Division to be deployed to combat what he called "Antifa terrorists". Cruz accused "Antifa protesters" of "organizing these acts of terror". In September 2020, Democratic Party presidential candidate Joe Biden also condemned antifa violent actions, having already condemned violence across the political spectrum and expressed his support for peaceful protests.

=== Trump administration ===
==== First presidency (2017–2021) ====
In August 2017, a petition was lodged with the White House petitioning system We the People calling upon President Donald Trump to formally classify "AntiFa" as terrorist. The White House responded in 2018 that federal law does not have a mechanism for formally designating domestic terrorist organizations. The writer of the petition later stated he had created it to "bring our broken right side together" and to "prop up antifa as a punching bag". Politico interviewed unidentified law enforcement officials who noted a rise in activity since the beginning of the Trump administration, particularly a rise in recruitment and on the part of the far right as well since the Charlottesville Unite the Right rally. One internal assessment acknowledged an inability to penetrate the groups' "diffuse and decentralized organizational structure". By 2017, the FBI and the DHS reported that they were monitoring suspicious antifa activity in relation to terrorism. President Trump described the protesters outside his August 2017 rally in Phoenix, Arizona, as "antifa".

In May and June 2020, during the nationwide George Floyd protests following Floyd's murder, Attorney General William Barr blamed the violence on "anarchic and far left extremist groups using Antifa-like tactics", and described the actions of "Antifa and other similar groups" as "domestic terrorism", echoing similar statements by National Security Advisor Robert C. O'Brien. In Twitter posts and other statements, Trump blamed "ANTIFA and the Radical Left" for violence, and repeatedly pledged that the federal government would designate antifa as a "Terrorist Organization". However, the president lacks the authority to do so because under existing law the federal government may designate only foreign organizations as terrorist and antifa is a loosely associated movement rather than a specific organization.

Legal experts, among others, believe that designating antifa as a terrorist group would be unconstitutional, raising First Amendment and due process issues. In 2020, historian Mark Bray wrote that antifa cannot be designated as a terrorist organization because "[t]he groups are loosely organized, and they aren't large enough to cause everything Trump blames them for." In addition, Bray argued that the political right has attempted to "blame everything on antifa" during the George Floyd protests and that in assuming antifa to be "predominantly white", it "evince[s] a kind of racism that assumes that black people couldn't organize on this deep and wide of a scale."

On June 2, 2020, The Nation reported on a copy of an FBI Washington Field Office internal situation report it had obtained which stated that the FBI had "no intelligence indicating Antifa involvement/presence" in the violent May 31 D.C.-area protests. Two days later, Barr claimed that "[w]e have evidence that antifa and other similar extremist groups, as well as actors of a variety of different political persuasions have been involved in instigating and participating in the violent activity." However, the Trump administration has provided no evidence for its claims and there is no evidence that antifa-aligned individuals played a role in instigating the protests or violence, or that antifa played a significant role in the protests.

According to Bray, while "confident that some members of antifa groups have participated in a variety of forms of resistance" during the protests, it is "impossible to ascertain the exact number of people who belong to antifa groups." As of June 9, 2020, none of the 51 people facing federal charges were alleged to have links to antifa. As of September 16, 2020, no antifa or left-wing group has been charged in connection with the civil unrest.

In an August 2020 interview, Trump asserted "people that are in the dark shadows" control his Democratic presidential opponent Joe Biden and then claimed that "we had somebody get on a plane from a certain city this weekend, and in the plane it was almost completely loaded with thugs, wearing these dark uniforms, black uniforms, with gear and this and that", adding that "they're people that are on the streets. They're people that are controlling the streets." Antifa activists commonly dress in black.

Trump's remarks were similar to false social media rumors during preceding months that planes and buses full of antifa gangs were preparing to invade communities, allegedly funded by George Soros. Two days after Trump's remarks, Barr asserted he knew antifa activists "are flying around the country" and "we are following them". However, there is no evidence of any such flight. According to Reuters, "[l]aw enforcement, intelligence and Congressional officials familiar with official reporting on weeks of protests and related arrests said on Tuesday they were aware of no incidents or reports that would confirm Trump's anecdote."

In a September 2020 whistleblower complaint, Brian Murphy, who was the Under Secretary of Homeland Security for Intelligence and Analysis until August 2020, asserted that DHS secretary Chad Wolf and his deputy Ken Cuccinelli instructed him "to modify intelligence assessments to ensure they matched up with the public comments by President Trump on the subject of ANTIFA and 'anarchist' groups." On September 18, 2020, Trump publicly criticized FBI Director Christopher A. Wray and hinted that he could fire him over Wray's testimony about antifa and Russian interference in the 2020 United States elections. On September 25, 2020, the Trump campaign released details of a "Platinum Plan for Black America", under which Antifa and the Ku Klux Klan would be prosecuted as terrorist organizations.

==== Second presidency (2025–present) ====
On September 17, 2025, Trump announced plans to designate antifa as a "major terrorist organization". The announcement came a week after the assassination of Charlie Kirk; the Trump advisor Stephen Miller blamed leftist organizations for the killing and encouraged Trump to target them. Much like Trump's attempt to target antifa in 2020, it was unclear how this would happen, as the president lacks the authority to designate antifa as a terrorist organization. Legal experts once again expressed concerns about the First Amendment and political suppression should it happen while others questioned whether such a designation would even have any impact. According to Mary B. McCord, the acting head of the DOJ's national security division during the Obama administration and the first Trump administration, "Trump can declare whatever he wants to declare, but there is no legal authority to actually designate a domestic group as a terrorist organization even assuming that antifa is an organization and not just an ideology. That means [Trump] declaring this has no legal impact. Certainly it does not trigger criminal terrorism charges, like providing material support to a foreign terrorist organization."

On September 22, Trump filed an executive order intended to designate antifa as a domestic terrorist organization, with the lack of a formal legal mechanism to do so. According to the executive order, the administration will "investigate, disrupt, and dismantle" individuals and groups associated with, or providing material support, to antifa. (Note: For the executive order, see Trump, Donald (September 22, 2025). "Designating Antifa as a Domestic Terrorist Organization". The White House.) This resulted in a surge on white supremacist social media channels, urging them to target specific people and perceived antifa members. Legal experts questioned the move, citing the lack of any federal authority to designate domestic terror groups, the fact that antifa is a movement rather than an organization, and the first-amendment concerns raised by using federal power against a domestic movement.

== Hoaxes and conspiracy theories ==
Conspiracy theories about antifa that tend to incorrectly portray antifa as an organization with leaders and secret sources of funding have been spread by right-wing activists, media organizations, and politicians, including Trump administration officials, as well as the 2020 Trump campaign.

=== #PunchWhiteWomen (2017) ===
In August 2017, a #PunchWhiteWomen photo hoax campaign was spread by fake antifa Twitter accounts. Bellingcat researcher Eliot Higgins discovered an image of British actress Anna Friel portraying a battered woman in a 2007 Women's Aid anti-domestic violence campaign that had been re-purposed using fake antifa Twitter accounts organized by way of 4chan. The image is captioned "53% of white women voted for Trump, 53% of white women should look like this" and includes an antifa flag. Another image featuring an injured woman is captioned "She chose to be a Nazi. Choices have consequences" and includes the hashtag #PunchANazi. Higgins remarked to the BBC that "[t]his was a transparent and quite pathetic attempt, but I wouldn't be surprised if white nationalist groups try to mount more sophisticated attacks in the future".

A similar fake image circulated on social media after the Unite the Right rally in 2017. The doctored image, actually from a 2009 riot in Athens, was altered to make it look like someone wearing an antifa symbol attacking a policeman with a flag. After the 2017 Las Vegas shooting, similar hoaxes falsely claimed that the shooter was an antifa "member"; another such hoax involved a fake antifa Twitter account praising the shooting. Another high-profile fake antifa account was banned from Twitter after it posted with a geotag originating in Russia. Such fake antifa accounts have been repeatedly reported on as real by right-leaning media outlets.

=== "Antifa civil war" (2017) ===
In October 2017, a conspiracy theory claiming that antifa groups were planning a violent insurrection or civil war the following month spread on YouTube and was advanced by far-right figures including Alex Jones, Lucian Wintrich, Paul Joseph Watson, and Steven Crowder. The basis for the conspiracy theory was a series of protests against Donald Trump organized by the group Refuse Fascism. The protests passed off as planned without causing significant disruption.

=== "Antifa Manual" (2017) ===
A fake "Antifa Manual" has circulated online, debunked by Snopes in 2017. According to the ADL, the language used in the document appears designed to sow division and features many statements that do not align with the sentiments of anti-fascist organizers, often clumsily mimicking "left wing" rhetoric. The same images continued to be shared on social media in posts about the 2020 Black Lives Matter protests, including a Twitter post by alt-lite conspiracy theorist Jack Posobiec.

=== 8chan list (2018) ===
In September 2018, the Louisiana State Police were scrutinized for using a hoax list of personal information about supposed antifa activists originally posted on 8chan's politics board. The document, dubbed "full list of antifa.docx" by police officers, actually contained the names of several thousand people who signed online petitions against then President Donald Trump. The State Police has refused to disclose the list, claiming it would "compromise" ongoing criminal investigations in which it expects arrests. A lawsuit against Louisiana State Police was filed on behalf of the record requester by Harvard lecturer and former public defender Thomas Frampton, alleging that the Police's refusal to release the list indicates that it actually believed the credibility of the hoax list and used it in investigations and litigations.

=== George Floyd protests (2020) ===
During the nationwide George Floyd protests against police brutality and racism in May and June 2020, false claims of impending antifa activity circulated through social media platforms, causing alarm in at least 41 towns and cities. On May 31, 2020, @ANTIFA_US, a newly created Twitter account, attempted to incite violence relating to the protests. The next day, after determining that it was linked to the white nationalist group Identity Evropa, Twitter suspended the fake account. The FBI's Washington Field Office report stated that members of a far-right group on social media had "called for far-right provocateurs to attack federal agents, use automatic weapons against protesters" during the D.C.-area protests over Floyd's murder on May 31, 2020.

Conservative news organizations, pro-Trump individuals using social media, and impostor social media accounts propagated false rumors that antifa groups were traveling to small cities, suburbs, and rural communities to instigate unrest during the protests. In May and June 2020, Lara Logan repeatedly promoted hoaxes as part of Fox News' coverage of antifa, including publishing a false document she described as an antifa battle plan and claiming that a joke about juggalos was evidence of a clandestine antifa hierarchy.

In June 2020, in an appearance on Fox News's The Ingraham Angle, Trump's personal attorney Rudy Giuliani claimed that "Antifa" as well as "Black Lives Matter" and unspecified communists were working together to "do away with our system of courts" and "take your property away and give it to other people", asserting without evidence that they receive significant funding from an outside source. Giuliani had previously criticized George Soros, who has been a frequent target of conspiracy theories, claiming he funded such groups and demonstrations.

In June 2020, the California Highway Patrol's air unit launched a search for "antifa buses" in response to Instagram and Facebook posts showing a van with the slogan "Black Lives Matter" written on it. Later in June 2020, a multiracial family on a camping trip in Forks, Washington, were accused of being antifa activists, harassed and trapped in their campsite when trees were felled to block the road. In Coeur d'Alene, Idaho, groups of armed right-wing vigilantes occupied streets in response to false rumors that antifa activists were planning to travel to the city while similar rumors led to threats being made against activists planning peaceful protests in Sonora, California. In Klamath Falls, Oregon, hundreds of people, most of whom were armed, assembled in response to false rumors that antifa activists would target the city, spread by a commander in the Oregon Air National Guard.

In an August 2020 interview, Trump spread a similar conspiracy theory, claiming that "thugs, wearing these dark uniforms, black uniforms, with gear and this and that" had boarded a plane to Washington, D.C. to disrupt the 2020 Republican National Convention. Also in August 2020, a fake antifa website began to redirect users to the Joe Biden 2020 presidential campaign website. Although this has been described as "clearly a ploy to associate the Democratic Party with antifa", some on the right seized upon it.

A 2021 Department of Homeland Security (DHS) internal report found that senior DHS officials had sought to portray the 2020 protests in Portland, Oregon, without evidence, as an organized effort by antifa to attack government institutions, and had ordered staff to characterize protests as "Violent Antifa Anarchist Inspired". A 2020 study by Zignal Labs found that unsubstantiated claims of antifa involvement were one of three dominant themes in misinformation and conspiracy theories around the protests, alongside claims that Floyd's murder had been faked and claims of involvement by George Soros. Some of the opposition to antifa activism has also been artificial in nature. Nafeesa Syeed of Bloomberg News reported that "[t]he most-tweeted link in the Russian-linked network followed by the researchers was a petition to declare Antifa a terrorist group".

=== Capitol attack (2021) ===
Immediately after the 2021 storming of the United States Capitol, a false claim that it was a false flag operation staged by antifa to implicate Trump supporters was spread by a number of Trump loyalists including Representative Mo Brooks, Mark Burns, Lou Dobbs, California State Senate minority leader Shannon Grove, Laura Ingraham, Mike Lindell, former Alaska Governor Sarah Palin, Texas Attorney General Ken Paxton, actor Kevin Sorbo, Eric Trump, and L. Lin Wood.

The conspiracy theory began on 4chan and similar websites before spreading to more mainstream conservative news sites. Representative Paul Gosar was the first member of Congress to claim that people associated with antifa were responsible for the attack. During Trump's second impeachment trial, his attorney Michael van der Veen stated that "One of the first people arrested was the leader of antifa."

In posts on Parler, leaders of the Proud Boys had disclosed plans to attend the rally wearing "all black" clothing associated with antifa activists and arrive "incognito" in an apparent effort to shift blame for any violence on antifa. A false claim that a facial recognition software company had identified participants in the incursion as antifa activists originated in a report by Rowan Scarborough published in The Washington Times, and was promoted on the U.S. House floor by Representative Matt Gaetz. The Washington Times retracted the story and issued a correction the next day.

The FBI said there was no evidence of antifa involvement in the mob incursion. The conspiracy was also promoted by Republican Senator Ron Johnson. A poll released in February 2021 by the American Enterprise Institute found that 30% of Americans (including 50% of Republicans and 20% of Democrats) believe antifa was mostly responsible for the violence that happened in the riots at the U.S. Capitol.

== Analyses and studies ==
Questions on how effective antifa is, and whether it is a reasonable response, have been raised and discussed by news media.

In a 2018 article titled "Is Antifa a Terrorist Group?", professor of criminology and terrorism researcher Gary LaFree analysed the actions of counter protesters during the events of the Unite the Right rally in the context of the Global Terrorism Database (GTD) guidelines. He concluded that "at this point in time antifa does not constitute a group and based on my application of the GTD coding rules, the actions of counter protesters in Charlottesville in 2017 does not constitute a terrorist attack." He particularly noted that, despite the incident seeming to meet some of the requirements to classify as an act of terrorism, such as the acts involving only "non-state actors" and being aimed at attaining a political goal, it did not meet the main requirement, namely intentionality; LaFree wrote, "it appears that in the Charlottesville case the antifa supporters were mostly responding to the actions of the marchers", rather than instigating the violence, and that there was no evidence of a coordinated attack or even that the counter protesters had come to the rally with the intention of committing violence. He also noted "the GTD team does not typically include as terrorism events where two opposing sides are locked in confrontation—even if it turns violent."

Although President Trump said in September 2025 that "the radicals on the left are the problem" with political violence, (Note: For the quote, see Sanger, David (September 12, 2025). "Trump Downplays Violence on the Right and Says the Left Is the Problem". The New York Times. Archived from the original on September 14, 2025.) cumulatively over decades most extremist killings in the U.S. have been caused by right-wing perpetrators. (Note: For the analysis of a 2025 study by the Cato Institute, see Schneid, Rebecca (September 16, 2025). "Trump Called for a Crackdown on the 'Radical Left.' But Right-Wing Extremists Are Responsible for More Political Violence". Time. Archived from the original on September 18, 2025. For the study dataset, see Nowrasteh, Alex (September 11, 2025). "Politically Motivated Violence Is Rare in the United States". Cato Institute. Archived from the original on September 17, 2025. Table 2.) From 2022 through 2024, all 61 political killings were committed by right-wing extremists. (Note: For the studies by the Anti-Defamation League for those years, see: "Murder and Extremism in the United States in 2022". Anti-Defamation League. February 20, 2023.; "Murder and Extremism in the United States in 2023". Anti-Defamation League. February 20, 2024.; "Murder and Extremism in the United States in 2024". Anti-Defamation League. February 21, 2025.; Citing the aforementioned studies, see also Riccardi, Nicholas (September 14, 2025). "Blame game after acts of political violence can lead to further attacks, experts warn". Associated Press. Archived from the original on September 15, 2025.)

Over decades, right-wing ideologically motivated homicides have substantially outnumbered those perpetrated by left-wing perpetrators in the U.S. (Note: For further analysis, see Jipson, Art; Becker, Paul J. (September 17, 2025). "Right-wing extremist violence is more frequent and more deadly than left-wing violence − what the data shows". The Conversation. Archived from the original on September 18, 2025.) Far-right motivated homicides have also occurred much more frequently than jihadi violence inspired by Islamic extremism (not shown in chart).

In June 2020, the think tank Center for Strategic and International Studies (CSIS) assembled a database of 893 terrorism incidents in the United States beginning in 1994. According to the database, there were no murders linked to antifa or anti-fascism since 1994. The only death resulting from an anti-fascist attack recorded in the database was that of Willem van Spronsen, who was shot dead by police while allegedly firebombing a U.S. Immigration and Customs Enforcement (ICE) detention center in Tacoma, Washington, in 2019. In contrast, the study highlighted the fact that 329 people were killed by American white supremacists or other right-wing extremists during the same period.

In July 2020, Heidi Beirich, a co-founder of the Global Project Against Hate and Extremism, said: "Antifa is not going around murdering people like rightwing extremists are. It's a false equivalence. I've at times been critical of antifa for getting into fights with Nazis at rallies and that kind of violence, but I can't think of one case in which an antifa person was accused of murder." Seth Jones, a counter-terrorism expert who led the creation of the CSIS's database, stated that "[l]eftwing violence has not been a major terrorism threat" and that "the most significant domestic terrorism threat comes from white supremacists, anti-government militias and a handful of individuals associated with the 'boogaloo' movement that are attempting to create a civil war in the United States."

In September 2020, the U.S. Department of Justice had not charged any left-wing groups in connection with civil unrest and extremism experts reiterated that far-right organized groups posed a greater threat of violence than antifa. Josh Lipowsky, a senior research analyst with the Counter Extremism Project, stated that "the decentralized antifa movement poses a lesser threat than the better organized groups on the far right." In October 2020, the CSIS database was updated to include the suspected killing of Aaron Danielson by Michael Reinoehl on September 3, 2020. When the investigation was still ongoing, Brian Levin said that if Reinoehl was implicated, it would mark the first case in recent history of an antifa supporter being charged with homicide. Reinoehl was charged by Portland police with second-degree murder and was later shot and killed by a federally led fugitive task force near Lacey, Washington. Reinoehl self-identified as antifa but was not associated with Rose City Antifa or the Portland-based anti-fascist organization Popular Mobilization.

== See also ==
- Anonymous (hacker group)
- Anarchism and violence
- Diversity of tactics
- Fascism in the United States
- Palestine Action, a British pro-Palestinian direct action network that, in mid-2025, the UK government designated as a terrorist group
