= Antifa: The Anti-Fascist Handbook =

2017 book by Mark Bray

- Author: Mark Bray
- Audio read by: Keith Szarabajka
- Language: English
- Subject: Social movements
- Publisher: Melville House
- Publication date: August 2017
- Publication place: United States
- Pages: 288
- ISBN: 978-1-61219-703-6

Antifa: The Anti-Fascist Handbook is a 2017 book written by American historian Mark Bray and published by Melville House Publishing, which explores the history of anti-fascist movements since the 1920s and 1930s and their contemporary resurgence.

== Content ==
Antifa: The Anti-Fascist Handbook details the emergence of anti-fascism in the 1920s and 1930s, and offers an analysis of contemporary anti-fascist movements, particularly antifa in the United States and Europe. Bray argues in his book that militant anti-fascism is a reasonable and legitimate political tradition, and describes his book as "an unabashedly partisan call to arms that aims to equip a new generation of anti-fascists with the history and theory necessary to defeat the resurgent far-right". Historical examples referred to in the book include the 43 Group, Rock Against Racism, the Red Warriors, and the Autonomen who popularized black bloc tactics. It also details key events in the history of anti-fascist movements, such as the Battle of Cable Street.

In addition to describing the history of anti-fascist movements, the book dedicates a chapter to "Five Historical Lessons for Anti-Fascists". It discusses the subject of antifa as it relates to deplatforming and freedom of speech. Interviews that Bray conducted with antifa activists are included in the book. Bray conducted 61 such interviews across 17 different countries. Bray uses the definition of fascism provided by Robert Paxton. He defines antifa as "illiberal politics of social revolutionism applied to fighting the Far Right, not only literal fascists" and as a "pan-left radical politics uniting communists, socialists, anarchists and various different radical leftists together for the shared purpose of combating the far right."

== Reception ==
The San Francisco Chronicle praised the book's writing, calling Bray's analysis "methodical and informative" and his arguments "incisive and cohesive".

Carlos Lozada of The Washington Post commented that "the book's most enlightening contribution is on the history of anti-fascist efforts over the past century, but its most relevant for today is its justification for stifling speech and clobbering white supremacists".

In the Los Angeles Review of Books, Luca Provenzano said that the book was "written from a commendable place of engagement and provides a serviceable genealogy for militant anti-fascism in the present", but was also critical of the book, saying that a "closer, more critical look at modern antifa's inception in the 1960s and '70s reveals some of the pitfalls of militant organizing, and a truly credible analysis of anti-fascist protest tactics would need to pay much closer attention to this period."

Fred Shaw, writing in the Pittsburgh Post-Gazette, called the book "pointed with concise analysis provided by an insider’s perspective", but also said it was "not a page-turner".

In Brazil, Bray's book featured in what Bray described as "a little bit of a controversy" on Twitter in 2021, when a member of the self-described "Anti-Fascism Police Movement" tweeted a photo of himself holding the book, to which the author replied that if he was really anti-fascist he should quit his job.
