= List of cases of the January 6 United States Capitol attack (A-F) =

On January 6, 2021, thousands of Trump supporters participated in the U.S. Capitol attack, disrupting the joint session of Congress assembled to count electoral votes to formalize Joe Biden's victory in the 2020 United States presidential election.

By the end of the year, 725 people had been charged with federal crimes. That number rose to 1,000 by the second anniversary of the attack, to 1,200 by the third anniversary (three-quarters of whom had by then been found guilty) and to 1,500 before the fourth anniversary. As of January 20, 2025, 1,575 people had been charged in connection with the January 6 attack, of whom 1,021 had pleaded guilty and 249 had been convicted at trial.

Upon Donald Trump's inauguration on January 20, 2025, he pardoned all but 14 of those people. The remaining 14 people, though their convictions stood, were eligible for immediate release from prison, as he commuted their sentences to "time served." Following Trump's pardons, the United States Department of Justice (DOJ) moved to dismiss some cases awaiting trial or sentencing. In April 2026, DOJ prosecutors filed a request to vacate the felony convictions for four Proud Boys who had received commutations rather than pardons, and indicated an intention to make similar requests for other January 6 defendants who had received commutations.

After the pardon, some January 6 defendants and their survivors moved to sue the Department of Justice and federal law enforcement agencies. Most notably, the Department of Justice agreed to pay the family of Ashli Babbitt, who was fatally shot in the Capitol assault, $5 million in a lawsuit settlement. Other January 6 defendants have gone to court to have their sentencing fines refunded, or to file claims against the U.S. Department of Justice and other federal law enforcement agencies for injuries or property damage. In March 2026, some January 6 defendants and others present at the protest that day filed a class action lawsuit against the U.S. federal government, alleging that the U.S. Capitol Police and the Washington, D.C. Metropolitan Police Department caused the plaintiffs physical and emotional injuries while defending the Capitol.

In May 2026, a new "Anti-Weaponization Fund" was announced, setting aside $1.776 billion of public funds to distribute to Trump allies who claimed to be victims of federal "weaponization and lawfare”. This was described as part of a settlement to end Trump's lawsuit against the Internal Revenue Service. Facing pushback, however, the DOJ said it would not pursue the fund. A judge has demanded proof. Another judge sanctioned the attorneys.

Days after the fund was announced, the Department of Justice acknowledged it was removing news releases from its websites that had documented criminal charges, convictions and sentencings of January 6 rioters. It described these prosecutions as "the DOJ’s weaponization under the Biden administration" and the news releases about them as "partisan propaganda". Lawfare Media published the deleted Department of Justice press releases in a database; as of June 9, 2026, it contained over 5,700 restored documents.

== Previous sources of information ==
A list of "breach" cases, meaning cases in which the defendant was alleged to have entered a restricted area of the Capitol during the riot, was kept updated by the US Attorney's Office, District of Columbia. It was available until the morning of January 24, 2025, four days after President Trump had issued a blanket pardon, but later in the day, it said "Page not found." CNN reported its erasure the next day. Soon afterwards, some of the video evidence that had been part of court cases related to the prosecutions disappeared from a government server. A coalition of press organizations went to court over the missing evidence, and a judge subsequently ordered the government to stop removing the materials.

NPR has a database of all 1,575 cases in the Capitol attack prior to Trump's pardons, searchable by U.S. state, charges, and case status.

For plea deals entered between April–October 2021, BuzzFeed has a searchable table. After Trump's mass pardon in 2025, the Democratic Secretary of States Association launched a website to track the Capitol attackers' ongoing legal issues. Lawfare Media released a study on January 6 clemency recipients who were subsequently arrested or convicted of other crimes since the attack, finding 97 such cases as of June 4, 2026.

== Index ==
- List of cases of the January 6 United States Capitol attack (A-F)
- List of cases of the January 6 United States Capitol attack (G-L)
- List of cases of the January 6 United States Capitol attack (M-S)
- List of cases of the January 6 United States Capitol attack (T-Z)

== Table ==
Arrest date	Name	Charges	Pleas	Judgment	Notes
January 18, 2023	Joshua Abate	Federal: Parading ... in a Capitol Building	Abate pleaded Guilty to the charge.	Sentenced on 9/13/2023 to one year of probation; 279 hours of community service; $10 special assessment; $500 restitution. On 11/27/2023, his request for early termination of probation was granted, effective immediately.	Abate received a full pardon on January 20, 2025
January 16, 2021	Rasha N. Abual-Ragheb	Federal: Entering ... Restricted Building; Disorderly ... Restricted Building; Violent Entry and Disorderly Conduct in a Capitol Building; Parading ... in a Capitol Building	Guilty – Parading ... in a Capitol Building	Sentenced to two months of home detention, 36 months of probation, 60 hours of community service, and $500 in restitution	Abual-Ragheb, 40, was one of seven rioters with ties to the far-right militia group the Three Percenters and was the first person linked to the group to plead guilty. Prior to the attack, Abual-Ragheb encouraged people on social media to "bring your own guns" and stated that she was bringing pepper spray, a knife, and a stun gun. She also stated that she would attack Black Lives Matter protesters if they said anything. Abual-Ragheb remained in the Capitol building for two minutes and reportedly yelled "Fuck you" and "We will hurt you" at law enforcement officers after leaving. The day after the riot, Abual-Ragheb posted a photo of herself in the Capitol building on Facebook with the caption that she "made history". On August 23, 2021, Abual-Ragheb pleaded guilty to parading, demonstrating, or picketing in the Capitol, a misdemeanor. A judge rejected Abual-Ragheb's request for her sentence to be delayed until January 1, 2022.
June 20, 2023	Richard Zachary Ackerman	Federal: Civil Disorder; Theft of Government Property	Ackerman pleaded Guilty to both charges.	Sentenced on 8/1/2024 to Time Served; 24 months of Supervised Release with 10 months of location monitoring; $125 Special Assessment; Restitution of $2,000.	Ackerman received a full pardon on January 20, 2025
January 16, 2021	Daniel Page Adams	Federal: Civil Disorder; Obstruction of an Official Proceeding and Aiding and Abetting; Assaulting ... Certain Officers; Entering ... in a Restricted Building or Grounds; Disorderly ... in a Restricted Building or Grounds; Disorderly Conduct in a Capitol Building; Parading ... in a Capitol Building	Adams pleaded Not Guilty to all charges. Found Guilty in a Stipulated Bench trial on all charges on 7/28/2023. The court dismissed the Obstruction conviction.	Sentenced on 12/10/2024 to 26 months incarceration; 36 months of supervised release; $2,000 fine; Special Assessment of $270.	Adams received a full pardon on January 20, 2025
September 06, 2023	Dennis George Adams, Jr.	Federal: Entering ... in a Restricted Building or Grounds; Disorderly ... in a Restricted Building or Grounds; Disorderly Conduct in a Capitol Building; Parading ... in a Capitol Building	Adams pleaded Guilty to one count: Entering ... in a Restricted Building or Grounds. The other charges are dismissed.	Sentenced on 4/15/2024 to 45 days of incarceration; 12 months of supervised release; Special Assessment of $25; Restitution of $500; 60 hours of community service.	Adams received a full pardon on January 20, 2025
September 18, 2023	Dustin Adams	Federal: Entering ... in a Restricted Building or Grounds; Disorderly ... in a Restricted Building or Grounds; Disorderly Conduct in a Capitol Building; Parading ... in a Capitol Building	Adams pleaded Not Guilty to all charges.	On 12/19/2024, the court dismissed the case without prejudice. The Court made its own findings, consistent with the provider's report of November 8, 2024, that Mr. Adams was not currently competent, was unlikely to regain competency.	
March 10, 2021	Howard Berton Adams	Federal: Civil Disorder; Obstruction of an Official Proceeding; Entering ... in a Restricted Building or Grounds; Disorderly ... in a Restricted Building or Grounds; Disorderly Conduct on Grounds or in a Capitol Building; Parading ... in a Capitol Building	Adams pleaded Guilty to one charge: Civil Disorder. The other charges are dismissed.	Sentenced 4/13/2023 to 8 months incarceration with credit for time served in pretrial detention; 36 months of supervised release; $100 special assessment; a fine of $2,000; restitution of $2,000.	Adams received a full pardon on January 20, 2025
March 09, 2021	Jared Hunter Adams	Federal: Entering ... in a Restricted Building; Disorderly ... in a Restricted Building; Violent Entry and Disorderly Conduct in a Capitol Building; Parading ... in a Capitol Building	Adams pleaded Not Guilty to all charges. Found Guilty on all charges in a Jury trial on 12/13/2024.	Sentencing set for 5/12/2025. On 1/23/2025, the court ordered that the case is dismissed without prejudice	
October 29, 2024	Joseph Michael Adams	Federal: Assaulting ... Certain Officers; Entering ... in a Restricted Building or Grounds; Disorderly ... in a Restricted Building or Grounds; Engaging in Physical Violence in a Restricted Building or Grounds; Disorderly Conduct in a Capitol Grounds or Buildings; Act of Physical Violence in the Capitol Grounds or Buildings; Parading, Picketing, or Demonstrating in a Capitol Building		On 1/22/2025, the court grants the government's motion to dismiss the case with prejudice.	
October 19, 2022	Justin Dee Adams	Federal: Civil Disorder; Assaulting ... Certain Officers; Entering ... in a Restricted Building or Grounds; Disorderly ... in a Restricted Building or Grounds; Engaging in Physical Violence in a Restricted Building or Grounds	Adams pleaded Guilty to one charge: Assaulting ... Certain Officers. The other charges are dismissed.	Sentenced on 12/8/2023 to 17 months incarceration; 1 year Supervised Release; $100 Special Assessment; Restitution of $2,000.	Adams received a full pardon on January 20, 2025
September 18, 2023	Karla Adams	Federal: Entering ... in a Restricted Building or Grounds; Disorderly ... in a Restricted Building or Grounds; Disorderly Conduct in a Capitol Building; Parading ... in a Capitol Building	Adams pleaded Guilty to two charges: Disorderly Conduct in a Capitol Building; Parading ... in a Capitol Building.	Sentencing set for 3/26/2025. On 1/22/2025, the court grants the government's motion to dismiss the case with prejudice	
April 22, 2021	Michael Gareth Adams	Federal: Entering ... in a Restricted Building; Disorderly ... in a Restricted Building; Violent Entry and Disorderly Conduct in a Capitol Building; Parading ... in a Capitol Building	Adams pleaded Guilty to one charge: Parading ... in a Capitol Building. The other charges are dismissed.	Sentenced on 9/22/2023 to 60 days incarceration; $500 restitution; $10 special assessment.	Adams received a full pardon on January 20, 2025
April 13, 2021	Thomas B. Adams Jr.	Federal: Obstruction of an Official Proceeding; Entering ... in a Restricted Building or Grounds; Disorderly ... in a Restricted Building or Grounds; Disorderly Conduct in a Capitol Building; Parading ... in a Capitol Building	Adams pleaded Not Guilty to all charges. Stipulated Bench trial held 1/30/2023.found Adams Guilty on 2 charges: Obstruction of an Official Proceeding; Entering ... in a Restricted Building or Grounds. The other charges are dismissed.	Sentenced on 6/16/2023 to 14 months of incarceration; 36 months of supervised release; $2,000 restitution; $125 special assessment. On 9/9/2024, the USCA vacated the Obstruction conviction. Resentenced on 11/12/2024 to time served; 12 months supervised release; $25 special assessment; $500 restitution.	Adams received a full pardon on January 20, 2025
February 27, 2024	Miles Brandon Adkins	Federal: Disorderly Conduct in a Capitol Building; Parading ... in a Capitol Building	Adkins pleaded Guilty to both charges.	Sentenced on 7/1/2024 to 24 Months of Probation; 12 days of intermittent confinement; Special Assessment of $20; Restitution of $500; Fine of $1,000.	Adkins received a full pardon on January 20, 2025
January 30, 2021	Zachary Jordan Alam	Federal: Assaulting ... Certain Officers; Assaulting ... Certain Officers Using a Dangerous Weapon; Civil Disorder; Destruction of Government Property; Obstruction of an Official Proceeding and Aiding and Abetting; Entering ... in a Restricted Building with a Deadly or Dangerous Weapon; Disorderly ... in a Restricted Building with a Deadly or Dangerous Weapon; Engaging in Physical Violence in a Restricted Building with a Deadly or Dangerous Weapon; Disorderly Conduct in a Capitol Building; Act of Physical Violence in the Capitol Building; Parading ... in a Capitol Building	Alam pleaded Not Guilty to all charges. On 8/8/2023, the court dismissed Count 2, Assaulting ... Certain Officers Using a Dangerous Weapon. Alam was found Guilty on all remaining charges in a Jury trial on 9/12/2023. Obstruction charge was dismissed at sentencing.	Sentenced on 11/7/2024 to 96 months incarceration; 36 months supervised release; $630 special assessment; $4,484 restitution.	Alam smashed the door panels to the House Speaker's lobby that Ashli Babbitt used to try to breach the chamber. Alam received a full pardon on January 20, 2025. On May 9, 2025, Alam was arrested on felony burglary charges. He was subsequently convicted and sentenced to seven years' imprisonment on those charges.
January 7, 2021	Christopher Michael Alberts	Federal: Civil Disorder; Assaulting ... Certain Officers; Entering ... Restricted Building or Grounds with a Deadly or Dangerous Weapon; Disorderly ... Restricted Building or Ground with a Deadly or Dangerous Weapon; Engaging in Physical Violence in a Restricted Building or Grounds; Unlawful Possession of a Firearm on Capitol Grounds or Buildings; Disorderly Conduct in a Capitol Building; Act of Physical Violence in the Capitol Grounds or Buildings; Carrying a Pistol Without a License Outside Home or Place of Business; Possession of a Large Capacity Ammunition Feeding Device	Not Guilty – all charges.	Sentenced to 84 months in prison after being convicted of nine charges—including six felonies—as well as 36 months of supervised release and ordered to pay $2,000	A former Virginia National Guard member, Alberts, 35, of Pylesville, Maryland, wore body armor, gas mask, military gear, and was armed with a 9-millimeter pistol — loaded with hollow point and high-pressure rounds — and brought an extra magazine of ammunition on Jan. 6th. Alberts was the first rioter to reach the northwest steps outside the Capitol and he used a wooden pallet as a makeshift battering ram against police officers who were guarding a stairwell outside the Capitol.
February 22, 2024	Christian Alfonso	Federal: Entering ... in a Restricted Building or Grounds; Disorderly ... in a Restricted Building or Grounds; Disorderly Conduct in a Capitol Building or Grounds; Parading ... in a Capitol Building	Alfonso pleaded Guilty to two charges: Disorderly Conduct in a Capitol Building or Grounds; Parading ... in a Capitol Building. The other charges are dismissed.	Sentenced on 1/10/2025 to 2 Years Probation; Special Assessment of $20; Restitution of $500.	Alfonso received a full pardon on January 20, 2025
March 29, 2021	Russell Dean Alford	Federal: Entering ... in a Restricted Building; Disorderly ... in a Restricted Building; Violent Entry and Disorderly Conduct in a Capitol Building; Parading ... in a Capitol Building	Alford pleaded Not Guilty to all charges. On 10/5/2022, Alford was found guilty on all charges by a jury.	Sentenced on 2/2/2023 to 12 months of incarceration; 12 months of supervised release; Special assessment of $70; Restitution of $500.	Alford received a full pardon on January 20, 2025
January 22, 2021	Tommy Frederick Allan	Federal: Corruptly Alerting, Destroying, Mutilating, or Concealing a Record, Document, or Other Object; Obstruction of an Official Proceeding; Theft of Government Property; Entering ... in a Restricted Building or Grounds; Disorderly ... in a Restricted Building or Grounds; Entering ... on the Floor of Congress; Disorderly Conduct in a Capitol Building; Parading ... in a Capitol Building	Allan pleaded Guilty to one charge: Obstruction of an Official Proceeding. The other charges are dismissed.	Sentenced on 12/8/2022 to 21 months incarceration; 36 months supervised release; $100 special assessment; $2,000 restitution.	Allan received a full pardon on January 20, 2025
June 30, 2021	Chase Kevin Allen	Federal: Act of Physical Violence on U.S. Capitol Grounds	Allen pleaded Guilty to the charge.	Sentenced on 4/20/2023 to 3 years of probation; 14 days of intermittent confinement; 50 hours of community service; $500 restitution; $10 special assessment.	Allen received a full pardon on January 20, 2025
May 15, 2024	Matthew Titus Allen	Federal: Entering ... in a Restricted Building or Grounds; Disorderly ... in a Restricted Building or Grounds; Disorderly Conduct in a Capitol Building or Grounds; Parading ... in a Capitol Building	Allen pleaded Guilty to two charges: Disorderly Conduct in a Capitol Building or Grounds; Parading ... in a Capitol Building.	Sentencing set for 1/31/2025. On 1/22/2025, the court grants the government's motion to dismiss the case with prejudice.	
July 06, 2023	Terry L. Allen	Federal: Civil Disorder; Assaulting ... Certain Officers Using a Dangerous Weapon (2 counts); Entering ... in a Restricted Building or Grounds with a Deadly or Dangerous Weapon; Disorderly ... in a Restricted Building or Grounds; Engaging in Physical Violence in Restricted Building or Grounds; Disorderly Conduct in a Capitol Building; Act of Physical Violence in the Capitol Grounds or Buildings	Allen pleaded Not Guilty to all charges. Found Guilty on all charges but one, Count 2 (Assaulting ... Certain Officers Using a Dangerous Weapon) in a Bench trial on 7/11/2024.	Sentenced on 11/14/2024 to 24 months incarceration; supervised release of 24 months; special assessment of $520; restitution of $1,000; 100 hours of community service.	Allen received a full pardon on January 20, 2025
March 28, 2024	Luke Almond	Federal: Entering ... in a Restricted Building or Grounds; Disorderly ... in a Restricted Building or Grounds; Disorderly Conduct in a Capitol Building; Parading ... in a Capitol Building	Almond pleaded Not Guilty to all charges.	Jury trial set for 2/24/2025. On 1/21/2025, the court grants the government's motion to dismiss the case with prejudice.	
February 06, 2024	Kevin Michael Alstrup	Federal: Entering ... in a Restricted Building or Grounds; Disorderly ... in a Restricted Building or Grounds; Disorderly Conduct in a Capitol Building; Parading ... in a Capitol Building	Alstrup pleaded Guilty to two charges: Disorderly Conduct in a Capitol Building; Parading ... in a Capitol Building.	Sentencing set for 2/12/2025. On 1/21/2025, the court grants the government's motion to dismiss the case with prejudice.	
January 31, 2021	Eduardo Nicolas Alvear Gonzalez	Federal: Entering ... in a Restricted Building or Grounds; Disorderly ... in a Restricted Building or Grounds; Disorderly Conduct in a Capitol Building; Parading ... in a Capitol Building	Alvear Gonzalez pleaded Guilty to one charge: Parading ... in a Capitol Building. The other charges are dismissed.	Sentenced 3/3/2022 to 24 months of probation; $10 special assessment; $500 restitution; $1,000 fine; 200 hours of community service.	Alvear Gonzalez received a full pardon on January 20, 2025
September 13, 2022	Lawrence Louis Ambrose	Federal: Parading ... in a Capitol Building	Ambrose pleaded Guilty to the single charge.	Sentenced on 3/13/2023 to 3 years of probation, 45 days home detention/location monitoring; 60 hours of community service; $500 fine, $500 restitution and $10 special assessment.	Ambrose received a full pardon on January 20, 2025
June 28, 2024	Michael Jerrett Amos	Federal: Civil Disorder; Assaulting ... Certain Officers using a Dangerous Weapon; Entering ... in a Restricted Building or Grounds with a Deadly or Dangerous Weapon; Disorderly ... in a Restricted Building or Grounds with a Deadly or Dangerous Weapon; Engaging in Physical Violence in a Restricted Building or Grounds with a Deadly or Dangerous Weapon; Disorderly Conduct in the Capitol Grounds or Buildings; Acts of Physical Violence in the Capitol Grounds or Buildings	Amos pleaded Not Guilty to all charges.	On 1/23/2025, the court ordered that the case is dismissed without prejudice	
June 22, 2023	Daniel Bibonge Amsini	Federal: Theft of Government Property	Amsini pleaded Guilty to Theft of Government Property.	Sentenced on 5/24/2024 to 45 Days of Incarceration; 12 Months of Supervised Release (with conditions); $749 Restitution and $25 Special Assessment.	Amsini received a full pardon on January 20, 2025
November 02, 2023	Edward Amyot	Federal: Disorderly ... in a Restricted Building or Grounds	Amyot pleaded Guilty to the charge.	Sentenced on 8/29/2024 to 24 months of probation with the first 60 days to be served on home detention; Special Assessment of $25; Restitution of $500; $5,000 fine; 60 hours of community service.	Amyot received a full pardon on January 20, 2025
February 25, 2021	John Steven Anderson	Federal: Civil Disorder; Assaulting ... Certain Officers; Theft of Government Property; Entering ... in a Restricted Building or Grounds; Disorderly ... in a Restricted Building or Grounds; Impeding Ingress and Egress in a Restricted Building or Grounds; Disorderly Conduct in a Capitol Building	Anderson pleaded Not Guilty to all charges.	He died Sept. 21, 2021, at Baptist Hospital South in Jacksonville, Florida, according to an obituary published by the St. John's Family Funeral Home and his lawyer. The court granted the order for abatement of prosecution on 10/1/2021	
April 29, 2024	Michael Anderson	Federal: Knowingly Entering or Remaining in any Restricted Building or Grounds Without Lawful Authority; Disorderly ... in a Restricted Building or Grounds; Disorderly Conduct in a Capitol Building or Grounds; Parading ... in a Capitol Building		On 1/22/2025, the court grants the government's motion to dismiss the case with prejudice	
August 28, 2023	Philip Anderson	Federal: Obstruction of an Official Proceeding; Civil Disorder; Entering ... in a Restricted Building or Grounds; Disorderly ... in a Restricted Building or Grounds; Disorderly Conduct in a Capitol Building; Parading ... in a Capitol Building	Anderson pleaded Not Guilty to all charges. The court dismisses the Obstruction charge on 12/20/2024. Jury Trial set to commence on 2/10/2025.	On 1/22/2025, the court grants the government's motion to dismiss the case with prejudice.	
October 29, 2024	Keith Andrews	Federal: Knowingly Entering or Remaining in any Restricted Building or Grounds Without Lawful Authority; Disorderly ... in a Restricted Building or Grounds; Disorderly Conduct in a Capitol Building; Parade, Demonstrate, or Picket in a Capitol Building		On 1/22/2025, the court grants the government's motion to dismiss the case with prejudice.	
October 29, 2024	Richard Andrews	Federal: Knowingly Entering or Remaining in any Restricted Building or Grounds Without Lawful Authority; Disorderly ... in a Restricted Building or Grounds; Disorderly Conduct in a Capitol Building; Obstruction of Law Enforcement During Civil Disorder; Assaulting ... Certain Officers		On 1/22/2025, the court grants the government's motion to dismiss the case with prejudice.	
February 04, 2021	John Daniel Andries	Federal: Obstruction of an Official Proceeding; Entering ... in a Restricted Building or Grounds; Disorderly ... in a Restricted Building or Grounds; Disorderly Conduct in a Capitol Building; Parading ... in a Capitol Building	Andries pleaded Guilty to one charge: Obstruction of an Official Proceeding. The other charges are dismissed.	Sentenced 1/17/2023 to 12 months and one day incarceration; 3 years supervised release; $2,000 restitution; special assessment of $100.	Andries received a full pardon on January 20, 2025
March 02, 2023	Ronald Andrulonis	Federal: Entering ... in a Restricted Building or Grounds; Disorderly ... in a Restricted Building or Grounds; Disorderly Conduct in a Capitol Building; Parading ... in a Capitol Building	Andrulonis pleaded Guilty to one charge: Entering ... in a Restricted Building or Grounds. The other charges are dismissed.	Sentenced on 12/15/2023 to 36 Months Probation; Restitution Of $500; Special Assessment Of $25; 14 days intermittent confinement; 60 days location monitoring.	Andrulonis received a full pardon on January 20, 2025
April 20, 2021	Anthony Alexander Antonio	Federal: Civil Disorder; Obstruction of an Official Proceeding; Destruction of Government Property; Entering ... in a Restricted Building or Grounds; Disorderly ... in a Restricted Building or Grounds; Engaging in Physical Violence in a Restricted Building or Grounds; Entering ... in Certain Rooms in the Capitol Building; Disorderly Conduct in a Capitol Building; Parading ... in a Capitol Building	Antonio pleaded Guilty to one charge: Obstruction of an Official Proceeding. On 11/5/2024, he withdrew the plea of Guilty to one charge of Obstruction and pleaded Guilty to Civil Disorder.	Sentencing set for 2/18/2025. On 1/23/2025, the court ordered that the case is dismissed without prejudice	
October 02, 2024	Ehsan Arbabi	Federal: Civil Disorder; Entering ... in any Restricted Building or Grounds Without Lawful Authority; Disorderly ... in a Restricted Building or Grounds; Disorderly Conduct in a Capitol Building or Grounds; Parading ... in a Capitol Building		On 1/22/2025, the court grants the government's motion to dismiss the case with prejudice.	
March 18, 2022	Melanie Archer	Federal: Entering ... in a Restricted Building or Grounds; Disorderly ... in a Restricted Building or Grounds; Disorderly Conduct in a Capitol Building; Parading ... in a Capitol Building	Archer pleaded Guilty to one charge: Parading ... in a Capitol Building. The other charges are dismissed.	Sentenced on 2/9/2023 to 18 months probation; 50 hours of community service; $500 restitution' special assessment of $10.	Archer received a full pardon on January 20, 2025
December 01, 2022	Vincent James Ardolino	Federal: Entering ... in a Restricted Building or Grounds; Disorderly ... in a Restricted Building or Grounds; Disorderly Conduct in a Capitol Building; Parading ... in a Capitol Building	Ardolino pleaded Guilty to one charge: Parading ... in a Capitol Building. The other charges are dismissed.	Sentenced on 9/18/2023 to 36 Months of Probation; Special Assessment of $10; Restitution of $500; Fine of $3,600; 400 hours of community service.	Ardolino received a full pardon on January 20, 2025
January 20, 2022	Kenneth Scott Armstrong III	Federal: Entering ... in a Restricted Building or Grounds; Disorderly ... in a Restricted Building or Grounds; Disorderly Conduct in a Capitol Building; Parading ... in a Capitol Building	Armstrong pleaded Guilty to one charge: Parading ... in a Capitol Building. The other charges are dismissed.	Sentenced on 6/13/2023 to 14 days incarceration; 36 months of probation; special assessment of $10; and restitution of $500.	Armstrong received a full pardon on January 20, 2025
October 26, 2022	David Rene Arredondo	Federal: Civil Disorder; Assaulting ... Certain Officers; Entering ... in a Restricted Building or Grounds; Disorderly ... in a Restricted Building or Grounds; Engaging in Physical Violence in a Restricted Building or Grounds; Disorderly Conduct in a Capitol Building; Act of Physical Violence in the Capitol Grounds or Buildings; Parading ... in a Capitol Building	Arredondo pleaded Guilty to all charges.	Sentenced on 8/8/2024 to 33 months incarceration; 36 months of supervised release; restitution of $2,000; special assessment of $305.	Arredondo received a full pardon on January 20, 2025
June 28, 2023	Michael Asbury	Federal: Civil Disorder; Entering or Remaining in a Restricted Building or Grounds; Disorderly or Disruptive Conduct in a Restricted Building or Grounds; Disorderly Conduct in a Capitol Building; Act of Physical Violence in the Capitol Grounds or Buildings	Asbury pleaded Guilty to one charge: Civil Disorder. The other charges are dismissed.	Sentenced on 8/26/2024 to 4 months of incarceration; 24 months of supervised release with 120 days location monitoring; Special Assessment of $100; Restitution of $2,000; 60 hours of community service.	Asbury received a full pardon on January 20, 2025
September 02, 2022	Neil Ashcraft	Federal: Theft of Government Property; Entering ... in a Restricted Building or Grounds	Ashcraft pleaded Guilty to both charges.	Sentenced on 3/8/2023 to 80 days incarceration; 12 months supervised release; $100 special assessment; $2,000 restitution.	Ashcraft received a full pardon on January 20, 2025
April 17, 2024	Joshua Lee Atwood	Federal: Civil Disorder; Assaulting ... Certain Officers Using a Dangerous Weapon (2 counts); Entering ... in a Restricted Building or Grounds with a Deadly or Dangerous Weapon; Disorderly ... in a Restricted Building or Grounds with a Deadly or Dangerous Weapon; Engaging in Physical Violence in a Restricted Building or Grounds with a Deadly or Dangerous Weapon; Disorderly Conduct in a Capitol Building; Act of Physical Violence in the Capitol Grounds or Building; Parading ... in a Capitol Building	Atwood pleaded Guilty to one charge: Assaulting ... Certain Officers Using a Dangerous Weapon. The other charges are dismissed.	Sentenced on 12/20/2024 to 48 months incarceration; 36 months supervised release; $2,000 restitution; $100 special assessment.	Atwood received a full pardon on January 20, 2025. Atwood subsequently pled guilty in an unrelated assault case, and was sentenced to six months in jail for the crime.
February 04, 2021	Mark Roderick Aungst	Federal: Entering ... in a Restricted Building; Disorderly ... in a Restricted Building; Violent Entry and Disorderly Conduct in a Capitol Building; Parading ... in a Capitol Building			Aungst pleaded Guilty to one charge: Parading, Demonstrating, or Picketing in a Capitol Building. He died by suicide prior to his sentencing hearing and the case was dismissed.
February 08, 2024	Daniel Avery	Federal: Entering ... in a Restricted Building or Grounds; Disorderly ... in a Restricted Building or Grounds; Disorderly Conduct in a Capitol Building; Parading ... in a Capitol Building	Avery pleaded Guilty to two charges: Disorderly Conduct in a Capitol Building; Parading ... in a Capitol Building. The other charges are dismissed.	Sentenced on 11/8/2024 to 14 days incarceration; 18 months probation; $500 in restitution; $20 special assessment; $1,000 fine.	Avery received a full pardon on January 20, 2025
February 08, 2024	Jaimee Avery	Federal: Entering ... in a Restricted Building or Grounds; Disorderly ... in a Restricted Building or Grounds; Disorderly Conduct in a Capitol Building; Parading ... in a Capitol Building	Avery pleaded Guilty to two charges: Disorderly Conduct in a Capitol Building; Parading ... in a Capitol Building. The other charges are dismissed.	Sentenced on 11/8/2024 to 18 months probation; $20 special assessment; $500 restitution; $1,000 fine.	Avery received a full pardon on January 20, 2025
February 13, 2023	Richard Avirett	Federal: Entering ... in a Restricted Building or Grounds; Disorderly ... in a Restricted Building or Grounds; Disorderly Conduct in a Capitol Building or Grounds; Parading ... in a Capitol Building	Avirett pleaded Guilty to one charge: Parading ... in a Capitol Building. The other charges are dismissed.	Sentenced on 1/4/2024 to 30 days incarceration; a $10 Special Assessment; Restitution in the amount of $500.	Avirett received a full pardon on January 20, 2025
January 09, 2024	Carlos Alberto Ayala	Federal: Civil Disorder; Entering ... in a Restricted Building or Grounds; Disorderly ... in a Restricted Building or Grounds; Disorderly Conduct in a Capitol Building; Parading ... in a Capitol Building	Ayala pleaded Not Guilty to all charges. Jury Trial set for 6/2/2025.	On 1/21/2025, the court grants the government's motion to dismiss the case with prejudice.	
January 25, 2021	Stephen Michael Ayres	Federal: Obstruction of an Official Proceeding and Aiding and Abetting; Entering ... in a Restricted Building or Grounds; Disorderly ... in a Restricted Building or Grounds; Disorderly Conduct in a Capitol Building	Ayres pleaded Guilty to one charge: Disorderly ... in a Restricted Building or Grounds. The other charges are dismissed.	Sentenced on 9/22/2022 to 24 months of probation, $500 restitution; $25 special assessment; 100 hours community service.	Ayres received a full pardon on January 20, 2025
January 18, 2023	Farbod Azari	Federal: Civil Disorder; Obstruction of an Official Proceeding and Aiding and Abetting; Assaulting ... Certain Officers; Assaulting ... Certain Officers using a Dangerous Weapon (2 counts); Destruction of Government Property; Entering ... in a Restricted Building or Grounds with a Deadly or Dangerous Weapon; Disorderly ... in a Restricted Building or Grounds; Engaging in Physical Violence in a Restricted Building or Grounds; Disorderly Conduct in a Capitol Building; Act of Physical Violence in the Capitol Grounds or Buildings; Parading ... in a Capitol Building	Azari pleaded Guilty to two charges: Civil Disorder; Assaulting ... Certain Officers using a Dangerous Weapon. The other charges are dismissed.	Sentenced on 6/7/2024 to 50 months incarceration; 24 months of supervised release; restitution of $2,000; special assessment of $200.	Azari received a full pardon on January 20, 2025
January 18, 2023	Farhad Azari	Federal: Civil Disorder; Obstruction of an Official Proceeding and Aiding and Abetting; Assaulting ... Certain Officers using a Dangerous Weapon (2 counts); Entering ... in a Restricted Building or Grounds; Disorderly ... in a Restricted Building or Grounds; Engaging in Physical Violence in a Restricted Building or Grounds; Disorderly Conduct in a Capitol Building; Act of Physical Violence in the Capitol Grounds or Buildings; Parading ... in the Capitol Building	Azari pleaded Guilty to two charges: Civil Disorder; Assaulting ... Certain Officers using a Dangerous Weapon. The other charges are dismissed.	Sentenced on 6/7/2024 to 30 months incarceration; 24 months of supervised release; restitution of $2,000; special assessment of $200.	Azari received a full pardon on January 20, 2025
June 30, 2021	Noah S. Bacon	Federal: Entering ... in a Restricted Building or Grounds; Disorderly ... in a Restricted Building or Grounds; Entering ... in the Gallery of Congress; Disorderly Conduct at the Grounds and in a Capitol Building; Parading ... in a Capitol Building; Obstruction of an Official Proceeding and Aiding and Abetting	Bacon pleaded Not Guilty to all charges. Found Guilty on all charges in a Jury trial on 3/2/2023.	Sentenced on 7/27/2023 to 12 months of incarceration; 24 months supervised release; $180 special assessment; $2,000 restitution.	Bacon received a full pardon on January 20, 2025
November 17, 2021	Edward Badalian	Federal: Conspiracy; Obstruction of an Official Proceeding and Aiding and Abetting; Tampering with Documents or Proceedings; Entering or Remaining in a Restricted Building or Grounds	Badalian pleaded Not Guilty to all charges. Bench trial began 2/28/2023 and concluded 3/6/2023. He was found Guilty of three charges: Conspiracy; Obstruction of an Official Proceeding and Aiding and Abetting; Entering or Remaining in a Restricted Building or Grounds. Found Not Guilty of Tampering with Documents.	Sentenced on 9/26/2023 to 51 Months Incarceration; Supervised Release of 36 Months; Special Assessment of $225; $2,000 In Restitution; 100 hours of community service. On 9/16/2024, the Court vacated two convictions: Conspiracy; Obstruction of an Official Proceeding and Aiding and Abetting. The fourth count stays and his sentence changed to 12 months incarceration; 12 months supervised release.	Badalian received a full pardon on January 20, 2025
June 26, 2023	Nathan Baer	Federal: Civil Disorder; Entering or Remaining in a Restricted Building or Grounds; Disorderly or Disruptive Conduct in a Restricted Building or Grounds; Disorderly Conduct in a Capitol Building; Act of Physical Violence in the Capitol Grounds or Buildings	Baer pleaded Guilty to one charge: Civil Disorder. The other charges are dismissed.	Sentenced on 9/6/2024 to 4 months of imprisonment; 24 months of supervised release; 120 days location monitoring; 60 hours of community service; Special Assessment: $100; Restitution: $2,000.	Baer received a full pardon on January 20, 2025
June 04, 2021	Stephanie M. Baez	Federal: Obstruction of an Official Proceeding; Entering ... in a Restricted Building or Grounds; Disorderly ... in a Restricted Building or Grounds; Disorderly Conduct in a Capitol Building or Grounds; Parading ... in a Capitol Building	On 5/15/2024, Baez pleaded Guilty to the four misdemeanor charges.	Bench trial was held December 3 and 4, 2024 on the Obstruction charge. On 1/17/2025, the court granted Baez's motion for acquittal on the Obstruction charge. On 1/22/2025, the court ordered that the case is dismissed without prejudice.	
May 30, 2021	Matthew Baggott	Federal: Entering ... in a Restricted Building or Grounds; Disorderly ... in a Restricted Building or Grounds; Disorderly Conduct in a Capitol Building; Parading ... in a Capitol Building	Baggott pleaded Guilty to one charge: Disorderly ... in a Restricted Building or Grounds. The other charges are dismissed.	Sentenced 8/5/2022 to 3 months incarceration, one year of supervised release, 60 hours of community service, $500 restitution; $25 special assessment.	Baggott received a full pardon on January 20, 2025
February 01, 2021	Stephen Maury Baker	Federal: Unlawful Entry in a Restricted Building or Grounds; Violent Entry and Disorderly Conduct in a Capitol Building; Parading ... in a Capitol Building	Baker pleaded Guilty to one charge: Parading ... in a Capitol Building. The other charges are dismissed.	Sentenced 5/13/2022 to 24 months probation; 9 days intermittent incarceration; $500 restitution; $10 special assessment.	Baker received a full pardon on January 20, 2025
March 01, 2024	Stephen Michael Baker	Federal: Entering ... in a Restricted Building or Grounds; Disorderly ... in a Restricted Building or Grounds; Disorderly Conduct in a Capitol Building; Parading, Picketing, and Demonstrating in a Capitol Building	Baker pleaded Guilty to all charges.	Sentencing set for 3/6/2025. On 1/22/2025, the court grants the government's motion to dismiss the case with prejudice	
February 01, 2023	Ronald Balhorn	Federal: Civil Disorder; Entering ... in a Restricted Building or Grounds; Disorderly ... in a Restricted Building or Grounds; Disorderly Conduct in a Capitol Building; Parading ... in a Capitol Building	Balhorn pleaded Not Guilty to all charges. In a Bench trial on 10/18/2023, he was found Not Guilty on two charges: Civil Disorder and Disorderly Conduct in a Capitol Building. Found Guilty on three charges: Entering ... in a Restricted Building or Grounds; Disorderly ... in a Restricted Building or Grounds; and Parading ... in a Capitol Building.	Sentenced on 2/21/2024 to 100 days incarceration; 12 months supervised release; special assessment of $60; fine of $2,000; restitution of $500; 200 hours of community service.	Balhorn received a full pardon on January 20, 2025
March 23, 2023	David A. Ball, Jr.	Federal: Entering ... in a Restricted Building or Grounds; Disorderly ... in a Restricted Building; Disorderly Conduct on Capitol Grounds; Parading ... in Capitol Building.	Ball pleaded Guilty to one charge: Parading ... in Capitol Building. The other charges are dismissed.	Sentenced on 1/11/2024 to 24 months of probation; Special assessment of $10; Fine of $500; and Restitution of $500.	Ball received a full pardon on January 20, 2025
May 02, 2023	Daniel Charles Ball	Federal: Civil Disorder; Assaulting ... Certain Officers Using a Dangerous Weapon (2 counts); Use of Explosive to Commit a Felony; Theft of Government Property; Entering ... in a Restricted Building or Grounds with a Deadly or Dangerous Weapon; Disorderly ... in a Restricted Building or Grounds with a Deadly or Dangerous Weapon; Engaging in Physical Violence in a Restricted Building or Grounds with a Deadly or Dangerous Weapon; Unlawful Possession of an Explosive in Capitol Grounds or Buildings; Act of Physical Violence in the Capitol Grounds or Buildings; Parading ... in a Capitol Building	Ball pleaded Not Guilty to all charges.	Not yet convicted or sentenced at time of clemency	After being granted Clemency by President Trump, on January 22, 2025, Ball was arrested in Washington, D.C., for the Middle District of Florida. In August 2024, Ball was charged in Florida with possession of a firearm or ammunition by a convicted felon. The materials were seized during a search of his home in early May 2023 while he was being investigated in the Jan. 6 case. Ball has previously been convicted of domestic battery by strangulation in 2017, as well as resisting law enforcement with violence and battery on a law enforcement officer, both in October 2022.
August 10, 2021	Thomas John Ballard	Federal: Civil Disorder (2 counts); Obstruction of an Official Proceeding and Aiding and Abetting; Assaulting ... Certain Officers; Assaulting ... Certain Officers Using a Dangerous Weapon; Entering ... in a Restricted Building or Grounds with a Deadly or Dangerous Weapon; Disorderly ... in a Restricted Building or Grounds with a Deadly or Dangerous Weapon; Engaging in Physical Violence in a Restricted Building or Grounds with a Deadly or Dangerous Weapon; Disorderly Conduct in Capitol Building; Act of Physical Violence in the Capitol Grounds or Buildings	Ballard pleaded Guilty to one charge: Assaulting ... Certain Officers Using a Dangerous Weapon. The other charges are dismissed.	Sentenced on 12/13/2023 to 54 months of incarceration with credit for time served; 3 years of supervised release; special assessment of $100; Restitution in the amount of $2,000; 240 hours of community service.	Ballard received a full pardon on January 20, 2025
August 09, 2021	Cynthia Catherine Ballenger	Federal: Entering ... in a Restricted Building or Grounds; Disorderly ... in a Restricted Building or Grounds; Disorderly Conduct in a Capitol Building; Parading ... in a Capitol Building	Ballenger pleaded Not Guilty to all charges. Found Guilty on all charges in a Bench trial held 3/21/2023.	Sentenced on 9/29/2023 to 4 months incarceration; 9 months Supervised Release; special Assessments totaling $70; Restitution of $500.	Ballenger received a full pardon on January 20, 2025
March 15, 2021	Robert Ballesteros	Federal: Parading ... in a Capitol Building	Guilty – the single charge.	Sentenced to 36 months' probation, 40 hours of community service, and $500 restitution.	
December 14, 2023	Barbara Balmaseda	Federal: Obstruction of an Official Proceeding; Entering ... in a Restricted Building or Grounds; Disorderly ... in a Restricted Building or Grounds; Disorderly Conduct in a Capitol building; Parading ... in a Capitol Building	Balmaseda pleaded Not Guilty to all charges.	Jury trial set for 3/25/2025. On 1/21/2025, the court grants the government's motion to dismiss the case with prejudice.	
January 29, 2021	Dawn Bancroft	Federal: Entering ... Restricted Building or Grounds; Disorderly ... Restricted Building or Grounds; Disorderly Conduct in a Capitol Building; Parading ... in a Capitol Building	Guilty – one charge: Parading, Demonstrating, and Picketing in a Capitol Building. The other charges are dismissed.	In July 2022, she was sentenced to 60 days in jail, 3 years' probation, and 100 hours of community service.	The 59-year-old woman from Doylestown, Pennsylvania, and Bucks County gym owner, who recorded a video during the attack on Jan 6 mentioning doing her part in breaking into the Capitol. In the video, not posted to social media or "meant for mass distribution", she remarked about the goal of shooting House Speaker Pelosi "in the friggin' brain" while exiting the building, after being inside for about a minute. The video was forwarded to the FBI by an acquaintance of Bancroft's. There was no evidence that privately she, or friend Santos-Smith, possessed a gun on their person on the day of the attack. Assistant U.S. Attorney Sean Murphy did not pursue charges of threatening a member of Congress. U.S. District Judge Emmet G. Sullivan accepted the pleas from both Bancroft and Santos-Smith, despite initial reservations.
March 08, 2024	John Banuelos	Federal: Civil Disorder; Entering ... in a Restricted Building or Grounds with a Deadly or Dangerous Weapon or Firearm; Disorderly ... in a Restricted Building or Grounds with a Deadly or Dangerous Weapon or Firearm; Unlawful Possession of a Firearm on Capitol Grounds or Buildings; Unlawful Discharge of a Firearm on Capitol Grounds or Buildings; Disorderly Conduct in a Capitol Building; DC charges: Unlawful Discharge of a Firearm; Carrying a Pistol Without a License (Outside Home or Place of Business); Possession of Unregistered Firearm	Banuelos pleaded Not Guilty to all charges.	On 1/22/2025, the court ordered that the case is dismissed without prejudice.	Prosecutors alleged that Banuelos fired his rifle into the air during the Capitol assault. Banuelos was charged in an unrelated aggravated kidnapping and sexual assault case on November 10, 2025.
November 10, 2022	Jeremy K. Baouche	Federal: Entering ... in a Restricted Building or Grounds; Disorderly ... in a Restricted Building or Grounds; Disorderly Conduct in a Capitol Building; Parading ... in a Capitol Building	Baouche pleaded Guilty to one charge: Parading ... in a Capitol Building. The other charges are dismissed.	Sentenced to 30 days incarceration; 2 years of probation; $10 special assessment; $500 restitution; $2,000 fine.	Baouche received a full pardon on January 20, 2025
November 10, 2021	Julio Baquero	Federal: Civil Disorder; Assaulting ... Certain Officers; Entering ... in a Restricted Building or Grounds; Disorderly ... in a Restricted Building or Grounds; Disorderly Conduct in a Capitol Building; Parading ... in a Capitol Building	Baquero pleaded Guilty to one charge: Civil Disorder. The other charges are dismissed.	Sentenced on 5/22/2023 to 18 months incarceration; 12 months Supervised Release; a $100 Special Assessment; Restitution of $2,000.	Baquero received a full pardon on January 20, 2025
January 12, 2021	Thomas Baranyi	Federal: Entering ... in a Restricted Building; Disorderly ... in a Restricted Building or Grounds; Disorderly Conduct in a Capitol Building; Parading, Demonstrating, and Picketing in a Capitol Building	Baranyi pleaded Guilty to one charge: Entering ... in a Restricted Building. The other charges are dismissed.	Sentenced on 6/17/2022 to 90 days incarceration; 1 year of supervised release; $25 special assessment; $500 in restitution; 60 hours of community service.	Baranyi received a full pardon on January 20, 2025
March 03, 2021	Eric Gene Barber	Federal: Entering ... in a Restricted Building or Grounds; Disorderly ... in a Restricted Building or Grounds; Disorderly Conduct in a Capitol Building or Grounds; Parading ... in a Capitol Building; (DC): Theft II	Barber pleaded Guilty to two charges: Parading ... in a Capitol Building; and Theft II (DC charge). The other charges are dismissed.	Sentenced on 6/14/2022 to 45 days incarceration; 24 months of probation; $552.95 restitution ($52.95 to C-SPAN); $60 special assessment. On 5/9/2024, Barber's term of Probation is revoked and he is remanded to the custody of the Bureau of Prisons to serve a term of 4 days with no term of Probation to follow.	Barber received a full pardon on January 20, 2025
July 31, 2023	Steven Boyd Barber	Federal: Disorderly ... in a Capitol Building or Grounds; Parading ... in a Capitol Building	Barber pleaded Guilty to both charges.	Sentenced on 5/15/2024 to 2 years of probation; $20 special assessment; $500 restitution; 60 hours of community service.	Barber received a full pardon on January 20, 2025
January 17, 2023	Kyler Joseph Bard	Federal: Assaulting ... Certain Officers; Civil Disorder; Entering ... in a Restricted Building or Grounds; Disorderly ... in a Restricted Building or Grounds; Engaging in Physical Violence in a Restricted Building or Grounds; Act of Physical Violence in the Capitol Grounds or Buildings	Bard pleaded Guilty to all charges.	Sentenced on 11/15/2024 to 12 months and 1 day; supervised release of 24 months; special assessment of $285; restitution of $2,000.	Bard received a full pardon on January 20, 2025
August 03, 2022	Jerod Thomas Bargar	Federal: Entering ... in a Restricted Building or Grounds with a Deadly or Dangerous Weapon	Bargar pleaded Guilty to the charge.	Sentenced on 1/9/2024 to 5 years of Probation; 6 months location monitoring; Special Assessment of $100; Restitution of $2,000; Fine of $4,000.	Bargar received a full pardon on January 20, 2025
February 25, 2021	Richard Franklin Barnard III	Federal: Entering ... Restricted Building or Grounds; Disorderly ... Restricted Building or Grounds; Disorderly Conduct in a Capitol Building; Parading, Demonstrating or Picketing in a Capitol	Guilty – one count of: Parading ... in a Capitol Building. The remaining charges were dismissed.	Sentenced to 12 months' probation, 30 days of home confinement, 60 hours of community service, and $500 restitution.	
November 13, 2024	Dennis Wayne Barnes	Federal: Entering ... in a Restricted Building or Grounds; Disorderly ... in a Restricted Building or Grounds; Disorderly Conduct in a Capitol Building or Grounds; Parading ... in a Capitol Building		On 1/22/2025, the court grants the government's motion to dismiss the case with prejudice.	
February 10, 2021	Joseph Cable Barnes	Federal: Obstruction of Justice/Congress; Knowingly Entering or Remaining in any Restricted Building or Grounds Without Lawful Authority; Violent Entry and Disorderly Conduct on Capitol Grounds		Barnes died on June 12, 2021 in a motorcycle crash in Austin, Texas. Accordingly, the government's motion for abatement is granted and the indictment against Mr. Barnes is hereby dismissed.	
January 8, 2021	Richard Barnett	Federal: Obstruction of an Official Proceeding and Aiding and Abetting; Entering ... Restricted Building or Grounds with a Deadly or Dangerous Weapon; Disorderly ... Restricted Building or Grounds with a Deadly or Dangerous Weapon; Entering and Remaining in Certain Rooms in the Capitol Building; Disorderly Conduct in a Capitol Building; Parading ... in a Capitol Building; Theft of Government Property (an envelope which has a value of less than $1,000)	Guilty – all charges.	4.5 years in prison. 3 years supervised release. $2,000 fine.	A 60-year-old man from Gravette, Arkansas. He was photographed with his feet on House Speaker Nancy Pelosi's desk during the attack. He was extradited to DC to face trial and jailed by federal judge Beryl Howell on January 28, 2021. His trial began on January 10, 2023. He was found guilty, and sentenced on May 24, 2023.
August 17, 2021	Logan James Barnhart	Federal: Assaulting ... Certain Officers Using a Dangerous Weapon and Aiding and Abetting; Civil Disorder; Entering ... in a Restricted Building or Grounds; Disorderly ... in a Restricted Building or Grounds; Engaging in Physical Violence in a Restricted Building or Grounds; Act of Physical Violence in the Capitol Grounds or Buildings	Barnhart pleaded Guilty to one charge: Assaulting ... Certain Officers Using a Dangerous Weapon. The other charges are dismissed.	Sentenced on 4/13/2023 to 36 Months of Imprisonment; Supervised release of 36 months; Restitution of $2,000; Fine $3,688; Special Assessment: $100.	Barnhart received a full pardon on January 20, 2025
July 24, 2024	Brandon Barnhill	Federal: Disorderly Conduct in a Capitol Building or Grounds; Parading ... in a Capitol Building	Barnhill pleaded Guilty to both charges.	Sentenced on 12/5/2024 to 24 Months of Probation; 60 hours of community service; Special Assessment of $20; Restitution of $500; Fine of $1,000.	Barnhill received a full pardon on January 20, 2025
May 09, 2024	Christine Barrello	Federal: Entering ... in a Restricted Building or Grounds; Disorderly Conduct in a Restricted Building or Grounds; Disorderly Conduct in a Capitol Building; Parading ... in a Capitol Building	Barrello pleaded Guilty to two charges: Disorderly Conduct in a Capitol Building; Parading ... in a Capitol Building.	Sentencing set for 3/26/2025. On 1/21/2025, the court grants the government's motion to dismiss the case with prejudice	
August 28, 2024	Jason Brian Barrett	Federal: Assaulting ... Certain Officers; Obstruction of Law Enforcement during Civil Disorder; Entering ... in a Restricted Building or Grounds; Disorderly ... in a Restricted Building or Grounds; Engaging in Physical Violence in a Restricted Building or Grounds; Disorderly Conduct in a Capitol Building		On 1/22/2025, the court grants the government's motion to dismiss the case with prejudice.	
March 15, 2022	Nancy Barron	Federal: Entering ... in a Restricted Building or Grounds; Disorderly ... in a Restricted Building or Grounds; Disorderly Conduct in a Capitol Building; Parading ... in a Capitol Building	Barron pleaded Not Guilty to all charges. Found Guilty on all charges in a Jury trial on 8/28/2023.	Sentenced on 5/2/2024 to 36 Months of Probation; 180 days of location monitoring; Special Assessment of $70; $500 restitution.	Barron received a full pardon on January 20, 2025
October 27, 2022	Katelyn Bartow	Federal: Entering ... in a Restricted Building or Grounds; Disorderly ... in a Restricted Building or Grounds; Disorderly Conduct in a Capitol Building; Parading ... in a Capitol Building	Bartow pleaded Guilty to one charge: Parading ... in a Capitol Building. The other charges are dismissed.	Sentenced on 2/1/2024 to 12 Months of Probation; 90 days location monitoring; Special Assessment: $10; Restitution: $500; Fine: $1,113; 60 hours of community service.	Bartow received a full pardon on January 20, 2025
October 28, 2022	Travis Bartow	Federal: Entering ... in a Restricted Building or Grounds; Disorderly ... in a Restricted Building or Grounds; Disorderly Conduct in a Capitol Building; Parading ... in a Capitol Building	Bartow pleaded Guilty to one charge: Parading ... in a Capitol Building. The other charges are dismissed.	Sentenced on 12/1/2023 to 12 Months of Probation; 30 days of location monitoring; Special Assessment of $10; Restitution of $500; Fine of $742; 60 hours of community service.	Bartow received a full pardon on January 20, 2025
December 13, 2023	David Mitchell Bates	Federal: Entering ... in a Restricted Building or Grounds; Disorderly ... in a Restricted Building or Grounds; Disorderly Conduct on Capitol Grounds; Parading ... in a Capitol Building	Bates pleaded Guilty to two charges: Disorderly Conduct on Capitol Grounds; Parading ... in a Capitol Building. The other charges are dismissed.	Sentenced on 10/31/2024 to 36 Months of Probation with the first 4 months on location monitoring; Special Assessment: $20; Restitution: $500; 30 hours of community service.	Bates received a full pardon on January 20, 2025
May 19, 2021	Pauline Bauer	Federal: Obstruction of an Official Proceeding; Entering ... in a Restricted Building or Grounds; Disorderly ... in a Restricted Building or Grounds; Disorderly Conduct in a Capitol Building; Parading ... in a Capitol Building	Bauer pleaded Not Guilty to all charges. Found Guilty on all charges in a Bench trial on 1/24/2023.	Sentenced on 5/30/2023 to 27 Months of Incarceration with credit for time served; 24 Months of Supervised Release; Special Assessment of $170; Restitution of $2,000.	Bauer received a full pardon on January 20, 2025
January 15, 2021	Robert L. Bauer	Federal: Entering ... in a Restricted Building; Disorderly ... in a Restricted Building; Violent Entry and Disorderly Conduct at the Grounds and in a Capitol Building; Parading, Demonstrating, and Picketing in a Capitol Building	Bauer pleaded Guilty to one charge: Parading, Demonstrating, and Picketing in a Capitol Building. The other charges were dismissed.	Sentenced 10/14/2021 to 45 days of incarceration; 60 hours of community service; special assessment of $10; and restitution in the amount of $500.	Bauer received a full pardon on January 20, 2025
September 20, 2022	Roger Kent Baugh	Federal: Civil Disorder	Baugh pleaded Guilty to the single charge.	Sentenced on 1/24/2023 to 12 months and 1 day incarceration; 2 years Supervised Release; a $100 Special Assessment; and Restitution of $2,000.	Baugh received a full pardon on January 20, 2025
October 01, 2024	Jimmy Dale Baugham	Federal: Entering ... in a Restricted Building or Grounds; Disorderly ... in a Restricted Building or Grounds; Disorderly ... in the Capitol Grounds or Buildings; Parading ... in a Capitol Building	Baugham pleaded Not Guilty to all charges.	On 1/22/2025, the court grants the government's motion to dismiss the case with prejudice.	
August 24, 2023	William Frederick Beals, II	Federal: Entering ... in a Restricted Building or Grounds; Disorderly ... in a Restricted Building or Grounds; Disorderly Conduct in a Capitol Building or Grounds; Parading ... in a Capitol Building; Theft of Government Property	Beals pleaded Guilty to two charges: Entering ... in a Restricted Building or Grounds; Disorderly ... in a Restricted Building or Grounds. The other charges are dismissed.	Sentenced on 9/10/2024 to 36 months of probation; 90 days location monitoring; Special Assessment of $50; Restitution of $500; 75 hours of community service.	Beals received a full pardon on January 20, 2025
January 16, 2021	Damon Michael Beckley	Federal: Obstruction of an Official Proceeding; Civil Disorder; Entering ... in a Restricted Building or Grounds; Disorderly ... in a Restricted Building or Grounds; Disorderly Conduct in a Capitol Building; Parading ... in the Capitol Buildings	Beckley pleaded Not Guilty to all charges. Stipulated Bench Trial held on 2/23/2023: The Court finds the defendant Guilty on 2 counts: Obstruction of an Official Proceeding and Civil Disorder. The other charges are dismissed.	Sentenced on 2/9/2024 to 18 months incarceration; 12 months supervised release; $200 special assessment; $2,000 restitution. On 11/20/2024, the USCA vacated the Obstruction conviction. Resentencing set for 1/24/2025. On 1/21/2025, the court grants the government's motion to dismiss the case with prejudice.	
February 08, 2022	Matthew Jason Beddingfield	Federal: Civil Disorder; Assaulting ... Certain Officers Using a Dangerous Weapon; Assaulting ... Certain Officers; Entering ... in a Restricted Building or Grounds with a Deadly or Dangerous Weapon; Disorderly ... in a Restricted Building or Grounds; Engaging in Physical Violence in a Restricted Building or Grounds; Disorderly Conduct in a Capitol Building; Act of Physical Violence in the Capitol Grounds or Buildings; Parading ... in a Capitol Building	Beddingfield pleaded Guilty to one charge: Assaulting ... Certain Officers. The other charges are dismissed.	Sentenced on 7/11/2023 to 38 Months Incarceration; supervised Release of 24 Months; Special Assessment Of $100; Restitution of $2000.	Beddingfield received a full pardon on January 20, 2025
October 02, 2024	Perry James Beebe	Federal: Disorderly Conduct in a Capitol Building; Parading ... in a Capitol Building	Beebe pleaded Guilty to both charges.	On 1/21/2025, the court grants the government's motion to dismiss the case with prejudice.	
November 24, 2021	James Beeks	Federal: Conspiracy to Obstruct an Official Proceeding; Obstruction of an Official Proceeding and Aiding and Abetting; Conspiracy to Prevent an Officer from Discharging Any Duties; Destruction of Government Property and Aiding and Abetting; Entering ... in a Restricted Building or Grounds; Civil Disorder and Aiding and Abetting	Beeks pleaded Not Guilty to all charges.	Acquitted in a Stipulated Bench Trial on 7/12/2023 of two charges: Conspiracy to Obstruct an Official Proceeding and Civil Disorder and Aiding and Abetting. The other charges are dismissed.	
March 06, 2024	James Link Behymer	Federal: Civil Disorder; Assaulting ... Certain Officers; Entering ... in a Restricted Building or Grounds; Disorderly ... in a Restricted Building or Grounds; Disorderly Conduct in a Capitol Building; Parading ... in a Capitol Building	Behymer pleaded Guilty to one charge: Assaulting ... Certain Officers.	Sentencing set for 2/13/2025. On 1/22/2025, the court ordered that the case is dismissed without prejudice	
September 23, 2022	Melanie Christine Belger	Federal: Entering ... in a Restricted Building or Grounds; Disorderly ... in a Restricted Building or Grounds; Disorderly Conduct in a Capitol Building; Parading ... in a Capitol Building	Belger pleaded Guilty to one charge: Parading ... in a Capitol Building. The other charges are dismissed.	Sentenced on 2/26/2024 to 36 months Probation; Special assessment of $10; restitution of $500; Fine of $4,000; 250 hours of community service.	Belger received a full pardon on January 20, 2025
December 07, 2023	Dana Jean Bell	Federal: Assaulting ... Certain Officers	Bell pleaded Guilty to the charge.	Sentenced on 10/17/2024 to 17 months of Incarceration; 36 months of Supervised Release (with conditions); $100 Special Assessment; Restitution of $2,000.	Bell received a full pardon on January 20, 2025
June 11, 2024	Christopher Belliveau	Federal: Civil Disorder; Assaulting ... Certain Officers Using a Dangerous Weapon and Inflicting Bodily Injury; Entering ... in a Restricted Building or Grounds with a Deadly or Dangerous Weapon; Disorderly ... in a Restricted Building or Grounds with a Deadly or Dangerous Weapon; Engaging in Physical Violence in a Restricted Building or Grounds with a Deadly or Dangerous Weapon; Disorderly Conduct in a Capitol Building; Act of Physical Violence in the Capitol Grounds or Buildings; Parading ... in the Capitol Buildings	Belliveau pleaded Not Guilty to all charges.	On 1/22/2025, the court grants the government's motion to dismiss the case with prejudice.	
November 10, 2021	Paul Belosic	Federal: Conspiracy to Commit an Offense Against the United States; Obstruction of an Official Proceeding; Tampering with Documents or Proceedings; Obstruction of Law Enforcement During Civil Disorder; Theft of Government Property; Destruction of Government Property; Entering ... in a Restricted Building or Grounds		On 1/23/2025, the court ordered that the case is dismissed without prejudice.	
September 19, 2024	Celena Gabrielle Belton	Federal: Entering ... in any Restricted Building or Grounds Without Lawful Authority; Disorderly ... in a Restricted Building or Grounds; Disorderly Conduct in a Capitol Building or Grounds; Parading ... in a Capitol Building		On 1/22/2025, the court grants the government's motion to dismiss the case with prejudice.	
July 29, 2021	Luke Wessley Bender	Federal: Obstruction of an Official Proceeding; Entering ... in a Restricted Building or Grounds; Disorderly ... in a Restricted Building or Grounds; Entering ... on the Floor of Congress; Disorderly Conduct in a Capitol Building; Parading ... in a Capitol Building	Bender pleaded Not Guilty to all charges. Found Guilty on all charges in a stipulated Bench trial on 12/7/2022.	Sentenced on 4/20/2023 to 21 months incarceration; supervised release of 36 months; special assessment of $180; $2,000 restitution. On 9/9/2024, the USCA vacated the Obstruction conviction. Resentenced on 12/19/2024 to Time Served; Supervised Release of 12 Months (With Conditions); $80 Special Assessment; Restitution of $2,000.	Bender received a full pardon on January 20, 2025
January 26, 2021	Andrew Ryan Bennett	Federal: Entering ... in a Restricted Building; Disorderly ... in a Restricted Building; Violent Entry and Disorderly Conduct in a Capitol Building; Parading ... in a Capitol Building	Bennett pleaded Guilty to one charge: Parading ... in a Capitol Building. The other charges were dismissed.	Sentenced 10/1/2021 to 24 months Probation; 80 hours of community service; Special Assessment in the amount of $10; and $500 restitution.	Bennett received a full pardon on January 20, 2025
April 12, 2021	Bradley Stuart Bennett	Federal: Obstruction of an Official Proceeding; Entering ... in a Restricted Building or Grounds; Disorderly ... in a Restricted Building or Grounds; Entering ... in the Gallery of Congress; Disorderly Conduct in a Capitol Building; Parading ... in a Capitol Building	Bennett pleaded Guilty to all charges except Obstruction of an Official Proceeding. On 9/12/2024, the government's Motion to Dismiss Count One, Obstruction, is granted.	Sentencing reset for 2/12/2025. On 1/21/2025, the court grants the government's motion to dismiss the case with prejudice.	
August 24, 2022	Tyler Bensch	Federal: Entering ... in a Restricted Building or Grounds; Disorderly ... in a Restricted Building or Grounds	Bensch pleaded Guilty to the two charges.	Sentenced on 7/7/2023 to 24 Months of Probation; home detention for 60 days; 60 hours of community service; Special Assessment of $50; Restitution of $500.	Bensch received a full pardon on January 20, 2025
March 08, 2024	Jordan Berk	Federal: Entering ... in a Restricted Building or Grounds; Disorderly Conduct in a Restricted Building or Grounds; Disorderly Conduct in a Capitol Building; Parading ... in a Capitol Building	Berk pleaded Guilty to one charge: Entering ... in a Restricted Building or Grounds.	Sentenced on 12/20/2024 to 24 Months of Probation (with conditions); Special Assessment $25; Restitution: $500; Fine: $1,098.	Berk received a full pardon on January 20, 2025
July 09, 2021	Caleb Berry	Federal: Conspiracy; Obstruction of an Official Proceeding and Aiding and Abetting	Berry pleaded guilty to one charge of Conspiracy and one charge of Obstruction of an Official Proceeding.	Sentenced on 10/25/2024 to 36 months of probation; special assessment of $200; restitution of $500.	Berry received a full pardon on January 20, 2025
October 06, 2022	Jeremy Bertino	Seditious conspiracy and illegal possession of firearms as a former felon	Guilty		Member of the Proud Boys
January 17, 2021	Bryan Betancur	Federal: Entering ... in a Restricted Building or Grounds; Disorderly ... in a Restricted Building or Grounds; Entering ... in Certain Rooms in the Capitol Building; Disorderly Conduct in a Capitol Building or Grounds; Parading ... in a Capitol Building	Betancur pleaded Guilty to one charge, Entering ... in a Restricted Building or Grounds.	Sentenced on 8/10/2022 to 4 months of incarceration, 12 months of supervised release, $500 restitution and $25 special assessment.	Betancur received a full pardon on January 20, 2025. Betancur was arrested and charged with assault and battery by Metro Transit Police in March 2026. He was arrested for stalking in April 2026.
February 26, 2024	Natalie Beyeler	Federal: Disorderly Conduct in a Capitol Building or Grounds; Parading ... in a Capitol Building	Beyeler pleaded Guilty to both charges.	Sentenced on 11/20/2024 to 1 Year probation; Special assessment of $20; Restitution of $500; 100 hours of community service.	Beyeler received a full pardon on January 20, 2025
June 06, 2024	Sohail Bhatti	Federal: Entering ... in a Restricted Building or Grounds; Disorderly ... in a Restricted Building or Grounds; Disorderly Conduct in a Capitol Building; Parading ... in a Capitol Building	Bhatti pleaded Guilty to one charge: Entering ... in a Restricted Building or Grounds.	Sentencing set for 2/26/2025. On 1/22/2025, the court grants the government's motion to dismiss the case with prejudice.	
July 26, 2023	Joseph Eric Bierbrodt	Federal: Civil Disorder; Assaulting ... Certain Officers; Entering ... in a Restricted Building or Grounds; Disorderly ... in a Restricted Building or Grounds; Engaging in Physical Violence in a Restricted Building or Grounds; Disorderly Conduct in a Capitol Building; Act of Physical Violence in the Capitol Building or Grounds; Parading ... in a Capitol Building	Bierbrodt pleaded Guilty to two charges: Civil Disorder; Assaulting ... Certain Officers.	Sentencing set for 2/3/2025. On 1/22/2025, the court grants the government's motion to dismiss the case with prejudice.	
July 26, 2023	William Bierbrodt	Federal: Civil Disorder; Destruction of Government Property; Entering ... in a Restricted Building or Grounds; Disorderly ... in a Restricted Building or Grounds; Disorderly Conduct in a Capitol Building; Parading ... in a Capitol Building	Bierbrodt pleaded Not Guilty to all charges.	This matter is abated because of the death of William Bierbrodt. The Clerk's Office is directed to terminate the case as to this Defendant only.	
January 20, 2021	Joseph Randall Biggs	Federal: Seditious Conspiracy; Conspiracy to Obstruct Official Proceeding; Obstruction of an Official Proceeding and Aiding and Abetting; Conspiracy to Prevent an Officer from Discharging Any Duties; Civil Disorder and Aiding and Abetting; Destruction of Government Property and Aiding and Abetting (2 counts); Assaulting ... Certain Officers (2 counts)	Biggs pleaded Not Guilty to all charges. Jury selection began on 12/19/2022. The jury found Biggs Guilty on six charges: Seditious Conspiracy; Conspiracy to Obstruct an Official Proceeding; Obstruction of an Official Proceeding and Aiding and Abetting; Conspiracy to Prevent an Officer from Discharging any Duties; Civil Disorder; Destruction of Government Property (fence). Not Guilty on one charge: Assaulting ... Certain Officers. No verdict on two charges: Destruction of Gov't Property (window); Assaulting ... Certain Officers.	Sentenced on 8/31/2023 to 17 years incarceration; 36 months supervised release; $600 special assessment. A proclamation commutes the sentence to time served as of January 20, 2025	
August 13, 2021	Steven Billingsley	Federal: Entering ... in a Restricted Building and Grounds; Disorderly ... in a Restricted Building and Grounds	Billingsley pleaded Guilty to one charge: Disorderly ... in a Restricted Building or Grounds. The other charge is dismissed.	Sentenced on 12/6/2022 to 24 Months of Probation; Special Assessment of $25; Restitution of $500; 60 hours of community service.	Billingsley received a full pardon on January 20, 2025
November 13, 2023	Lawrence Silas Billiter	Federal: Civil Disorder; Obstruction of an Official Proceeding; Assaulting ... Certain Officers Using a Dangerous Weapon; Assaulting ... Certain Officers; Entering ... in a Restricted Building or Grounds with a Deadly or Dangerous Weapon; Disorderly ... in a Restricted Building or Grounds with a Deadly or Dangerous Weapon; Engaging in Physical Violence in a Restricted Building or Grounds with a Deadly or Dangerous Weapon; Disorderly Conduct in a Capitol Building; Act of Physical Violence in the Capitol Grounds or Buildings; Parading, Picketing, and Demonstrating in a Capitol Building	Billiter pleaded Not Guilty to all charges. The court dismissed the Obstruction charge with prejudice on 12/2/2024. In a Bench trial verdict on 12/16/2024, found Guilty on five charges: Civil Disorder; Assaulting ... Certain Officers; Disorderly Conduct in a Capitol Building; Act of Physical Violence in the Capitol Grounds or Buildings; Parading, Picketing, and Demonstrating in a Capitol Building. Also Guilty on lesser charges of the remaining four.	Sentencing is set for 4/2/2025. On 1/21/2025, the court grants the government's motion to dismiss the case with prejudice.	
September 16, 2024	Todd Michael Bills	Federal: Entering or Remaining in a Restricted Building or Grounds; Disorderly or Disruptive Conduct in a Restricted Building or Grounds; Disorderly Conduct in a Capitol Building; Parading ... in a Capitol Building		On 1/23/2025, the court grants the government's motion to dismiss the case with prejudice.	
November 22, 2021	Aiden Henry Bilyard	Federal: Civil Disorder; Assaulting ... Certain Officers Using a Dangerous Weapon; Entering ... in a Restricted Building or Grounds with a Deadly or Dangerous Weapon; Disorderly ... in a Restricted Building or Grounds with a Deadly or Dangerous Weapon; Engaging in Physical Violence in a Restricted Building or Grounds with a Deadly or Dangerous Weapon; Disorderly Conduct in a Capitol Building; Act of Physical Violence in the Capitol Grounds or Buildings; Destruction of Government Property and Aiding and Abetting; Parading ... in a Capitol Building	Bilyard pleaded Guilty to one charge: Assaulting ... Certain Officers Using a Dangerous Weapon. The other charges are dismissed.	Sentenced on 3/17/2023 to 40 months incarceration; 3 years supervised release; Special Assessment of $100; Restitution of $3,500.	Bilyard received a full pardon on January 20, 2025
January 18, 2021	Craig Michael Bingert	Federal: Obstruction of an Official Proceeding and Aiding and Abetting; Assaulting ... Certain Officers; Civil Disorder; Entering ... in a Restricted Building or Grounds; Disorderly ... in a Restricted Building or Grounds; Engaging in Physical Violence in a Restricted Building or Grounds; Engaging in an Act of Physical Violence in the Grounds or Any of the Capitol Buildings	Bingert pleaded Not Guilty to all charges. Found Guilty on all charges in a Bench trial on 5/23/2023.	Sentenced on 9/26/2023 to 96 months incarceration; 36 months of supervised release; $2,000 in restitution; $2,000 fine; $385 special assessment.	Bingert received a full pardon on January 20, 2025
June 22, 2021	Brian Glenn Bingham	Federal: Civil Disorder; Assaulting ... Certain Officers; Entering ... in a Restricted Building or Grounds; Disorderly ... in a Restricted Building or Grounds; Disorderly Conduct in a Capitol Building; Parading ... in a Capitol Building	Bingham pleaded Not Guilty to all charges. Found Guilty on all charges in a Jury trial on 11/4/2024.	Sentencing set for 2/7/2025. On 1/21/2025, the court grants the government's motion to dismiss the case with prejudice.	
October 18, 2023	Francis Gregory Biondo	Federal: Entering ... in a Restricted Building or Grounds; Disorderly ... in a Restricted Building or Grounds; Disorderly Conduct on Capitol Grounds; Parading ... in any of the Capitol Buildings	Biondo pleaded Guilty to one charge: Entering ... in a Restricted Building or Grounds. The other charges are dismissed.	Sentenced on 8/27/2024 to 12 months of Probation; Restitution of $500; $25 Special Assessment; 120 hours of community service.	Biondo received a full pardon on January 20, 2025
March 16, 2021	Elliot Bishai	Federal: Entering ... in a Restricted Building or Grounds; Disorderly ... in a Restricted Building or Grounds; Disorderly Conduct in a Capitol Building; Parading ... in a Capitol Building	Bishai pleaded Guilty to one charge: Entering ... in a Restricted Building or Grounds. The other charges are dismissed.	Sentenced 7/29/2022 to 14 days of incarceration; 12 months of Supervised Release; $500 restitution; Special Assessment of $25.	Bishai received a full pardon on January 20, 2025
August 07, 2023	Bryan Roger Bishop	Federal: Civil Disorder; Assaulting ... Certain Officers using a Dangerous Weapon and Inflicting Bodily Injury (2 counts); Entering ... in a Restricted Building or Grounds with a Deadly or Dangerous Weapon; Disorderly ... in a Restricted Building or Grounds with a Deadly or Dangerous Weapon; Engaging in Physical Violence in a Restricted Building or Grounds with a Deadly or Dangerous Weapon; Disorderly Conduct in a Capitol Building; Act of Physical Violence on Capitol Grounds or Buildings; Parading ... in a Capitol Building	Bishop pleaded Guilty to one lesser charge: Assaulting ... Certain Officers. The other charges are dismissed.	Sentenced on 9/3/2024 to 45 months of Incarceration; 36 months of Supervised Release; $100 Special Assessment; Restitution of $2,000.	Bishop received a full pardon on January 20, 2025
December 08, 2023	Tanya Bishop	Federal: Assaulting ... Certain Officers	Bishop pleaded Guilty to the charge.	Sentencing reset for 2/5/2025. On 1/22/2025, the court grants the government's motion to dismiss the case with prejudice	
August 07, 2023	Tonya Bishop	Federal: Entering ... in a Restricted Building or Grounds; Disorderly ... in a Restricted Building or Grounds; Disorderly Conduct in a Capitol Building or Grounds; Parading ... in a Capitol Building	Bishop pleaded Guilty to two charges: Disorderly Conduct in a Capitol Building or Grounds; Parading ... in a Capitol Building. The other charges are dismissed.	Sentenced on 7/11/2024 to 24 months of probation; $500 of restitution; $20 special assessment; 80 hours of community service.	Bishop received a full pardon on January 20, 2025
January 19, 2021	Gina Michelle Bisignano	Federal: Obstruction of an Official Proceeding and Aiding and Abetting; Civil Disorder; Destruction of Government Property and Aiding and Abetting; Entering ... in a Restricted Building or Grounds; Disorderly ... in a Restricted Building or Grounds; Engaging in Physical Violence in a Restricted Building or Grounds; Disorderly Conduct in a Capitol Building	Bisignano pleaded Guilty to six charges: Obstruction of an Official Proceeding and Aiding and Abetting; Civil Disorder; Entering ... in a Restricted Building or Grounds; Disorderly ... in a Restricted Building or Grounds; Engaging in Physical Violence in a Restricted Building or Grounds; Disorderly Conduct in a Capitol Building. On 5/4/2023, her wish to withdraw her Guilty plea to Count 1 was granted. On 7/16/2024, the court dismisses Count 1, Obstruction.	Sentencing reset for 1/16/2025. On 1/21/2025, the court grants the government's motion to dismiss the case with prejudice.	
February 26, 2021	Dona Sue Bissey	Federal: Entering ... in a Restricted Building; Disorderly ... in a Restricted Building; Violent Entry and Disorderly Conduct in a Capitol Building; Parading ... in a Capitol Building	Bissey pleaded Guilty to Parading ... in a Capitol Building. The other charges were dismissed.	Sentenced 10/12/2021 to 14 days of incarceration; 60 hours of community service; $10 special assessment; restitution of $500.	Bissey received a full pardon on January 20, 2025
January 30, 2024	Shannon J. Bitzer	Federal: Civil Disorder; Assaulting ... Certain Officers; Assaulting ... Certain Officers Using a Dangerous Weapon (2 counts); Entering ... in a Restricted Building or Grounds with a Deadly or Dangerous Weapon; Disorderly ... in a Restricted Building or Grounds; Engaging in Physical Violence in a Restricted Building or Grounds; Disorderly Conduct in a Capitol Building; Act of Physical Violence in the Capitol Building or Grounds; Parading ... in a Capitol Building	Bitzer pleaded Not Guilty to all charges.	Jury Trial set for 3/3/2025. On 2/17/2025, the court grants the government's motion to dismiss the case with prejudice.	
October 24, 2024	Robert Bixby	Federal: Knowingly Entering or Remaining in any Restricted Building or Grounds Without Lawful Authority; Knowingly, and with intent to impede or disrupt the orderly conduct of Government business or official functions; Disorderly Conduct in a Capitol Building or Grounds; Parading ... in a Capitol Building		On 1/22/2025, the court grants the government's motion to dismiss the case with prejudice	
January 14, 2022	Joshua Matthew Black	Federal: Obstruction of an Official Proceeding and Aiding and Abetting; Entering ... in a Restricted Building or Grounds with a Deadly or Dangerous Weapon; Disorderly ... in a Restricted Building or Grounds with a Deadly or Dangerous Weapon; Unlawful Possession of a Dangerous Weapon on Capitol Grounds or Buildings; Entering ... on the Floor of Congress; Disorderly Conduct in a Capitol Building	Black pleaded Not Guilty to all charges. In a Bench trial completed 1/13/2023, he was found Not Guilty of one charge: Obstruction. He was found Guilty of the remaining five charges.	Sentenced on 5/16/2023 to 20 months of incarceration; 24 months of supervised release; Special Assessment of $320; Restitution of $2,000.	Black received a full pardon on January 20, 2025
February 08, 2024	Thomas Edward Blackwood, Sr.	Federal: Disorderly Conduct in a Capitol Building; Parading ... in a Capitol Building	Blackwood pleaded Guilty to both charges.	Sentenced on 11/20/2024 to 4 Years probation; Special assessment of $20; Restitution of $500; 100 hours of community service.	Blackwood received a full pardon on January 20, 2025
September 19, 2024	Bennett Andrew Blair	Federal: Entering ... in any Restricted Building or Grounds Without Lawful Authority; Disorderly ... in a Restricted Building or Grounds; Disorderly Conduct in a Capitol Building or Grounds; Parading ... in a Capitol Building		On 1/22/2025, the court grants the government's motion to dismiss the case with prejudice.	
February 17, 2021	David Alan Blair	Federal and DC: Assaulting ... Certain Officers Using a Dangerous Weapon; Civil Disorder; Obstruction of an Official Proceeding; Entering ... in a Restricted Building or Grounds with a Deadly or Dangerous Weapon; Disorderly ... in a Restricted Building or Grounds with a Deadly or Dangerous Weapon; Engaging in Physical Violence in a Restricted Building or Grounds with a Deadly or Dangerous Weapon; Unlawful Possession of a Dangerous Weapon on Capitol Grounds or Buildings; Disorderly Conduct on Grounds or in a Capitol Building; Act of Physical Violence in the Capitol Grounds or Buildings (Federal); Assaulting a Law Enforcement Officer (DC)	Blair pleaded Guilty to one federal charge: Civil Disorder. The other charges are dismissed. His DC charge was disposed of by nolle prosequi on March 11, 2021.	Sentenced 7/13/2022 to 5 months incarceration; 18 months of supervised release; $100 special assessment; $2,000 restitution.	Blair received a full pardon on January 20, 2025
March 23, 2021	Kevin Sam Blakely	Federal: Entering ... Restricted Building; Disorderly ... Restricted Building; Violent Entry and Disorderly Conduct in a Capitol Building; Parading ... in a Capitol Building	Guilty – one charge: Parading ... in a Capitol Building. The other charges are dismissed.	Sentenced to 120 days in jail, 18 months' probation, and $500 in restitution	
May 19, 2021	William Blauser Jr.	Federal: Obstruction of an Official Proceeding; Entering ... in a Restricted Building or Grounds; Disorderly ... in a Restricted Building or Grounds; Disorderly Conduct in a Capitol Building; Parading ... in a Capitol Building	Blauser pleaded Guilty to one charge: Parading ... in a Capitol Building. The other charges are dismissed.	Sentenced 2/3/2022 to pay $10 Special Assessment; a $500 Fine; restitution in the amount of $500.	Blauser received a full pardon on January 20, 2025
January 15, 2021	Matthew Bledsoe	Federal: Obstruction of an Official Proceeding and Aiding and Abetting; Entering ... in a Restricted Building or Grounds; Disorderly ... in a Restricted Building or Grounds; Disorderly Conduct in a Capitol Building; Parading ... in a Capitol Building	Bledsoe pleaded Not Guilty to all charges. At trial on 7/21/2022, a jury found him guilty on all charges.	Sentenced on 10/21/2022 to 4 years incarceration; 3 years supervised release; $2,000 fine; $2,000 restitution; $170 special assessment. On 9/9/2024, the USCA vacated the Obstruction conviction.	Bledsoe received a full pardon on January 20, 2025
January 24, 2022	Jason Benjamin Blythe	Federal: Civil Disorder; Assaulting ... Certain Officers Using a Dangerous Weapon, Inflicting Bodily Injury and Aiding and Abetting (2 counts); Entering ... in a Restricted Building or Grounds with a Deadly or Dangerous Weapon; Disorderly ... in a Restricted Building or Grounds with a Deadly or Dangerous Weapon; Engaging in Physical Violence in a Restricted Building or Grounds with a Deadly or Dangerous Weapon, Resulting in Significant Bodily Injury, and Aiding and Abetting; Disorderly Conduct in a Capitol Building or Grounds; Act of Physical Violence in the Capitol Grounds or Buildings and Aiding and Abetting; Obstruction of an Official Proceeding and Aiding and Abetting	Blythe pleaded Not Guilty to all charges. Bench trial verdict on 2/2/2024 finds him Guilty on three charges: Civil Disorder; Assaulting ... Certain Officers Using a Dangerous Weapon, Inflicting Bodily Injury and Aiding and Abetting; Act of Physical Violence in the Capitol Grounds or Buildings and Aiding and Abetting. Not Guilty on six charges. On 9/3/2024, the Court orders dismissal of the Obstruction charge.	Sentenced on 9/19/2024 to 30 months incarceration; 36 months of supervised release; $2,000 in restitution; $210 special assessment.	Blythe received a full pardon on January 20, 2025
May 13, 2021	Eric Bochene	Federal: Entering ... in a Restricted Building; Disorderly ... in a Restricted Building; Violent Entry and Disorderly Conduct and Parading ... in a Capitol Building; Parading ... in a Capitol Building	Bochene pleaded Guilty to one charge: Entering ... in a Restricted Building. The other charges are dismissed.	Sentenced on 11/2/2023 to 90 days incarceration with credit for time served; 12 months supervised release; $25 special assessment; $500 restitution; 60 hours of community service. On 5/16/2024 Bochene concedes to 3 violations of conditions - his Supervised Release is Revoked and he is sentenced to 5 months incarceration with credit for federal time served; 7 months supervised release.	Bochene received a full pardon on January 20, 2025
June 03, 2022	Brian Boele	Federal: Civil Disorder; Entering ... in a Restricted Building or Grounds; Disorderly ... in a Restricted Building or Grounds; Disorderly Conduct in the Capitol Grounds or Buildings	Boele pleaded Not Guilty to all charges.	Jury trial set for 3/3/2025. On 1/21/2025, the court grants the government's motion to dismiss the case with prejudice.	
May 17, 2024	Leslie Bogue	Federal: Entering ... in a Restricted Building or Grounds; Disorderly ... in a Restricted Building or Grounds; Disorderly Conduct in a Capitol Building or Grounds; Parading ... in a Capitol Building	Bogue pleaded Not Guilty to all charges.	On 1/27/2025, the court grants the government's motion to dismiss the case with prejudice.	
May 25, 2022	Bradley Bokoski	Federal: Entering ... in a Restricted Building or Grounds; Disorderly ... in a Restricted Building or Grounds; Disorderly Conduct on Capitol Grounds; Parading ... in a Capitol Building	Bokoski pleaded Guilty to one charge: Parading ... in a Capitol Building. The other charges are dismissed.	Sentenced on 5/25/2023 to 36 months Probation; $10 Special Assessment; Restitution of $500; 150 hours of community service.	Bokoski received a full pardon on January 20, 2025
May 25, 2022	Matthew Bokoski	Federal: Entering ... in a Restricted Building or Grounds; Disorderly ... in a Restricted Building or Grounds; Disorderly Conduct on Capitol Grounds; Parading ... in a Capitol Building	Bokoski pleaded Guilty to one charge: Parading ... in a Capitol Building. The other charges are dismissed.	Sentenced on 5/25/2023 to 36 months Probation; $10 Special Assessment; Restitution of $500; 150 hours of community service.	Bokoski received a full pardon on January 20, 2025
January 26, 2023	Kenneth Bonawitz	Federal: Civil Disorder; Assaulting ... Certain Officers (6 counts); Entering ... in a Restricted Building or Grounds with a Deadly or Dangerous Weapon; Disorderly ... in a Restricted Building or Grounds with a Deadly or Dangerous Weapon; Engaging in Physical Violence in a Restricted Building or Grounds with a Deadly or Dangerous Weapon; Act of Physical Violence in the Capitol Grounds or Buildings	Bonawitz pleaded Guilty to three charges: Civil Disorder and two counts of Assaulting ... Certain Officers. The other charges are dismissed.	Sentenced on 1/17/2024 to 60 months of incarceration with credit for time served; 36 months of supervised release; Special assessment of $300; Restitution in the amount of $2,000.	Bonawitz received a full pardon on January 20, 2025
May 26, 2022	Stacy Lee Bond	Federal: Entering ... in a Restricted Building or Grounds; Disorderly ... in a Restricted Building or Grounds; Disorderly Conduct in a Capitol Building or Grounds; Parading ... in a Capitol Building	Bond pleaded Guilty to one charge: Parading ... in a Capitol Building. The other charges are dismissed.	Sentenced on 1/5/2023 to 18 Months of Probation; 20 days home detention; Special Assessment of $10 and Restitution of $500; 50 hours of community service.	Bond received a full pardon on January 20, 2025
March 18, 2022	Jordan Bonenberger	Federal: Entering ... in a Restricted Building or Grounds; Disorderly ... in a Restricted Building or Grounds; Disorderly Conduct in a Capitol Building; Parading ... in a Capitol Building	Bonenberger pleaded Guilty to one charge: Parading ... in a Capitol Building. The other charges are dismissed.	Sentenced on 9/5/2023 to 18 Months of Probation; Special Assessment $10; Restitution $500; Fine $2000; 50 hours of community service.	Bonenberger received a full pardon on January 20, 2025
January 27, 2021	James Bonet	Federal: Obstruction of an Official Proceeding; Entering ... in a Restricted Building or Grounds; Disorderly ... in a Restricted Building or Grounds; Entering ... in Certain Rooms in the Capitol Building; Disorderly Conduct in a Capitol Building; Parading ... in a Capitol Building	Bonet pleaded Guilty to one charge: Entering ... in a Restricted Building or Grounds. The other charges are dismissed.	Sentenced 3/9/2022 to 90 Days Incarceration Followed By 1 Year Of Supervised Release; Special Assessment Of $25.00; Restitution Of $500; 200 hours of community service.	Bonet received a full pardon on January 20, 2025
December 04, 2024	Robert James Bonham	Federal: Obstruction of Law Enforcement During Civil Disorder; Assaulting ... Certain Officers; Entering ... in a Restricted Building or Grounds; Disorderly ... in a Restricted Building or Grounds; Engaging in Physical Violence in a Restricted Building or Grounds; Disorderly Conduct in a Capitol Building; Act of Physical Violence in the Capitol Grounds or Buildings		On 1/22/2025, the court grants the government's motion to dismiss the case with prejudice.	
October 03, 2024	Andre Maurice Bonneau	Federal: Civil Disorder; Assaulting ... Certain Officers; Entering ... in a Restricted Building or Grounds; Disorderly ... in a Restricted Building or Grounds; Engaging in Physical Violence in a Restricted Building or Grounds; Disorderly Conduct in a Capitol Building; Act of Physical Violence in the Capitol Grounds or Buildings		On 1/22/2025, the court ordered that the case is dismissed without prejudice.	
April 27, 2023	Jonathan Bonney	Federal: Entering ... in a Restricted Building or Grounds; Disorderly ... in a Restricted Building or Grounds; Disorderly Conduct in a Capitol Building; Parading ... in a Capitol Building	Bonney pleaded Guilty to all charges.	Sentenced on 7/12/2024 to 12 months of probation; Special assessment of $70; $500 restitution; 60 hours of community service.	Bonney received a full pardon on January 20, 2025
October 16, 2024	Thomas Bordeau, Sr.	Federal: Entering ... in a Restricted Building or Grounds; Disorderly ... in a Restricted Building or Grounds; Disorderly Conduct in a Capitol Building; Parading ... in the Capitol Buildings	Bordeau pleaded Not Guilty to all charges.	On 1/21/2025, the court grants the government's motion to dismiss the case with prejudice.	
October 08, 2024	John Paul Bordeaux	Federal: Civil Disorder; Assaulting ... Certain Officers; Entering ... in a Restricted Building or Grounds; Disorderly ... in a Restricted Building or Grounds; Engaging in Physical Violence in a Restricted Building or Grounds; Disorderly Conduct in a Capitol Building; Act of Physical Violence in the Capitol Grounds or Buildings	Bordeaux pleaded Not Guilty to all charges.	On 1/21/2025, the court grants the government's motion to dismiss the case with prejudice.	
January 14, 2025	Nathan Bordeaux	Federal: Assaulting ... Certain Officers; Civil Disorder; Entering ... in a Restricted Building or Grounds; Disorderly ... in a Restricted Building or Grounds; Disorderly Conduct in a Capitol Building; Act of Physical Violence in the Capitol Grounds or Buildings; Parading, Picketing, and Demonstrating in a Capitol Building		On 1/22/2025, the court grants the government's motion to dismiss the case with prejudice.	
August 06, 2021	Therese Borgerding	Federal: Civil Disorder; Entering ... in a Restricted Building or Grounds; Disorderly ... in a Restricted Building or Grounds; Disorderly Conduct in a Capitol Building; Parading ... in a Capitol Building	Borgerding pleaded Not Guilty to all charges. Found Guilty on all charges in a Jury trial on 4/26/2024.	Sentenced on 9/4/2024 to 50 days of Incarceration; 130 days location monitoring; 36 months of Supervised Release; $170 Special Assessment; $2,000 Restitution.	Borgerding received a full pardon on January 20, 2025
March 19, 2024	Joshua Scott Borum	Federal: Entering ... in a Restricted Building or Grounds; Disorderly ... in a Restricted Building or Grounds; Disorderly Conduct in a Capitol Building; Parading ... in a Capitol Building	Borum pleaded Guilty to two charges: Disorderly Conduct in a Capitol Building; Parading ... in a Capitol Building. The other charges are dismissed.	Sentenced on 9/6/2024 to 24 Months of Probation; Special Assessment of $20; Fine of $2,000; Restitution of $500; 100 hours of community service.	Borum received a full pardon on January 20, 2025
February 14, 2024	Mitchell Bosch	Federal: Civil Disorder; Assaulting ... Certain Officers; Entering ... in a Restricted Building or Grounds; Disorderly ... in a Restricted Building or Grounds; Engaging in Physical Violence in a Restricted Building or Grounds; Disorderly Conduct in a Capitol Building; Act of Physical Violence in the Capitol Grounds or Buildings	Bosch pleaded Not Guilty to all charges. In a Jury trial on 11/18/2024, he was found Guilty on six charges; Not Guilty on one charge: Engaging in Physical Violence in a Restricted Building or Grounds.	Sentencing set for 4/14/2025. On 1/21/2025, the court grants the government's motion to dismiss the case with prejudice.	
May 25, 2022	Karegan Bostic	Federal: Entering ... in a Restricted Building; Disorderly ... in a Restricted Building; Violent Entry and Disorderly Conduct in a Capitol Building; Parading ... in a Capitol Building	Bostic pleaded Guilty to one charge: Parading ... in a Capitol Building. The other charges are dismissed.	Sentenced 3/9/2023 to 36 months probation; 30 days location monitoring; Special Assessment of $10; $500 restitution.	Bostic received a full pardon on January 20, 2025
October 13, 2021	Willard Thomas Bostic, Jr.	Federal: Entering ... in a Restricted Building or Grounds; Disorderly ... in a Restricted Building or Grounds; Disorderly Conduct in a Capitol Building; Parading ... in a Capitol Building	Bostic pleaded Guilty to one charge: Parading ... in a Capitol Building. The other charges are dismissed.	Sentenced on 3/9/2023 to 36 Months of Probation; 90 days location monitoring; 40 hours of community service; Special Assessment of $10; $500 restitution.	Bostic received a full pardon on January 20, 2025
December 07, 2021	Tim Levon Boughner	Federal: Assaulting ... Certain Officers Using a Dangerous Weapon or Inflicting Bodily Injury; Civil Disorder; Obstruction of an Official Proceeding; Entering ... in a Restricted Building or Grounds; Disorderly ... in a Restricted Building or Grounds; Engaging in Physical Violence in a Restricted Building or Grounds; Disorderly Conduct in a Capitol Building; Impeding Passage Through the Capitol Grounds or Buildings; Act of Physical Violence in the Capitol Grounds or Buildings.	Boughner pleaded Not Guilty to all charges.	On 1/22/2025, the court ordered that the case is dismissed without prejudice	
July 10, 2023	Zachariah Boulton	Federal: Entering ... in a Restricted Building or Grounds; Disorderly ... in a Restricted Building or Grounds; Disorderly Conduct in a Capitol Building or Grounds; Parading ... in a Capitol Building	Boulton pleaded Guilty to one charge: Entering ... in a Restricted Building or Grounds. The other charges are dismissed.	Sentenced on 2/6/2024 to 24 months of Probation; Special Assessment of $25; Fine of $500; Restitution of $500; 50 hours of community service.	Boulton received a full pardon on January 20, 2025
January 29, 2023	Patrick Bournes	Federal: Civil Disorder; Entering ... in a Restricted Building or Grounds; Disorderly ... in a Restricted Building or Grounds; Engaging in Physical Violence in a Restricted Building or Grounds; Impeding Passage Through the Capitol Grounds or Buildings	Bournes pleaded Guilty to one charge: Civil Disorder.	Sentenced on 6/28/2024 to four months incarceration; 24 months of supervised release with 4 months of home detention; $2,000 in restitution; $16,000 fine; $100 special assessment.	Bournes received a full pardon on January 20, 2025
May 03, 2024	Benjamin Bowden	Federal: Disorderly ... in a Restricted Building or Grounds	Bowden pleaded Guilty to the charge.	Sentencing hearing set for 2/28/2025. On 1/21/2025, the court grants the government's motion to dismiss the case with prejudice	
November 01, 2023	Dylan Bowling	Federal: Entering ... in a Restricted Building or Grounds; Disorderly ... in a Restricted Building or Grounds; Disorderly Conduct on Capitol Grounds; Parading ... in any of the Capitol Buildings	Bowling pleaded Guilty to two charges: Disorderly Conduct on Capitol Grounds; Parading ... in any of the Capitol Buildings. The other charges are dismissed.	Sentenced on 7/19/2024 to 24 months of probation, the first 30 days to be served on home detention; $20 special assessment; $500 restitution; 60 days community service.	Bowling received a full pardon on January 20, 2025
November 01, 2023	Marissa Lee Bowling	Federal: Entering ... in a Restricted Building or Grounds; Disorderly ... in a Restricted Building or Grounds; Disorderly Conduct on Capitol Grounds; Parading ... in any of the Capitol Buildings	Bowling pleaded Guilty to two charges: Disorderly Conduct on Capitol Grounds; Parading ... in any of the Capitol Buildings. The other charges are dismissed.	Sentenced on 7/19/2024 to 24 months of probation; $20 special assessment; $500 restitution; 60 hours of community service.	Bowling received a full pardon on January 20, 2025
March 06, 2023	David Worth Bowman	Federal: Obstruction of an Official Proceeding and Aiding and Abetting; Entering ... in a Restricted Building or Grounds; Disorderly ... in a Restricted Building or Grounds; Entering ... on the Floor of Congress; Disorderly Conduct in a Capitol Building; Parading ... in a Capitol Building	Bowman pleaded Not Guilty to all charges. Found Guilty on all charges in a Stipulated Bench trial on 2/12/2024. On 10/7/2024, the court vacated the Obstruction conviction.	Sentenced on 12/13/2024 to 2 Months Incarceration; 12 Months Of Supervised Release (With Conditions); Restitution of $500; Special Assessment of $80.	Bowman received a full pardon on January 20, 2025
December 15, 2022	Dominic Box	Federal: Obstruction of an Official Proceeding; Civil Disorder (2 counts); Entering ... in a Restricted Building or Grounds; Disorderly ... in a Restricted Building or Grounds; Disorderly Conduct in a Capitol Building; Parading ... in a Capitol Building	Box pleaded Not Guilty to all charges. Stipulated Bench trial held on 6/18/2024. The court dismisses the Obstruction charge on 10/11/2024. Verdict of Guilty on all remaining charges on 10/28/2024.	Sentencing is set for 2/21/2025. On 1/22/2025, the court grants the government's motion to dismiss the case with prejudice	
February 12, 2021	Leo Brent Bozell IV	Federal: Obstruction of an Official Proceeding; Destruction of Government Property (2 counts); Civil Disorder; Assaulting ... Certain Officers; Entering ... in a Restricted Building or Grounds; Disorderly ... in a Restricted Building and Grounds; Disorderly Conduct in a Capitol Building; Act of Physical Violence in the Capitol Grounds or Buildings; Parading ... in a Capitol Building	Bozell pleaded Not Guilty to all charges. Found Guilty in a Bench trial on 9/8/2023 on all charges.	Sentenced on 5/17/2024 to 45 months incarceration; Supervised Release of 24 months; Special assessment of $505; Restitution in the amount of $4,729.	Bozell received a full pardon on January 20, 2025
August 26, 2024	Darrin Bradley	Federal: Entering ... in a Restricted Building or Grounds; Disorderly ... in a Restricted Building or Grounds; Disorderly Conduct in a Capitol Building or Grounds; Parading ... in a Capitol Building	Bradley pleaded Not Guilty to all charges.	On 2/10/2025, the court ordered that the case is dismissed without prejudice.	
July 21, 2023	Matthew Brackley	Federal: Assaulting ... Certain Officers	Brackley pleaded Guilty to the charge.	Sentenced on 5/14/2024 to 15 Months of Incarceration; 24 Months of Supervised Release; 50 hours of community service; Restitution of $2,000; Fine of $1,000; $100 Special Assessment.	Brackley received a full pardon on January 20, 2025
September 07, 2023	Michael Bradley	Federal: Civil Disorder; Assaulting ... Certain Officers Using a Dangerous Weapon; Entering ... in a Restricted Building or Grounds with a Deadly or Dangerous Weapon; Disorderly ... in a Restricted Building or Grounds with a Deadly or Dangerous Weapon; Engaging in Physical Violence in a Restricted Building or Grounds with a Deadly or Dangerous Weapon; Disorderly Conduct on Capitol Grounds; Act of Physical Violence on Capitol Grounds	Bradley pleaded Not Guilty to all charges. Found Guilty on all charges in a Bench trial on 8/29/2024.	Sentenced on 12/17/2024 to 60 Months incarceration; Supervised Release for 3 Years; Restitution of $2,000.	Bradley received a full pardon on January 20, 2025
June 27, 2023	Brandon Lee Bradshaw	Federal: Entering ... in a Restricted Building or Grounds; Disorderly ... in a Restricted Building or Grounds; Disorderly Conduct in a Capitol Building; Parading ... in a Capitol Building	Bradshaw pleaded Guilty to one charge, count 2: Disorderly ... in a Restricted Building or Grounds. The other charges are dismissed.	Sentenced on 2/20/2024 to 4 months of Incarceration; 12 months of Supervised Release (with conditions); $25 Special Assessment; $500 Fine; Restitution of $500.	Bradshaw received a full pardon on January 20, 2025
September 02, 2021	Cory Ray Brannan	Federal: Entering ... in any Restricted Building or Grounds; Disorderly ... in a Restricted Building or Grounds; Disorderly Conduct in a Capitol Building; Parading ... in a Capitol Building	Brannan pleaded Guilty to one charge: Parading ... in a Capitol Building. The other charges are dismissed.	Sentenced on 9/23/2022 to 30 days incarceration; 24 months of probation, 60 hours of community service, $500 restitution; Special assessment of $10.	Brannan received a full pardon on January 20, 2025
June 15, 2022	Frank Joseph Bratjan Jr.	Federal: Parading ... in a Capitol Building	Bratjan pleaded Guilty to the single charge.	Sentenced on 9/14/2022 to 6 Months Probation; $10 Special Assessment; $1,500 Fine; Restitution of $500; 60 hours community service.	Bratjan received a full pardon on January 20, 2025
April 12, 2022	Jerry Daniel Braun	Federal: Civil Disorder; Obstruction of an Official Proceeding; Assaulting ... Certain Officers; Assaulting ... Certain Officers Using a Dangerous Weapon; Destruction of Government Property; Entering ... in a Restricted Building or Grounds with a Deadly or Dangerous Weapon; Disorderly ... in a Restricted Building or Grounds with a Deadly or Dangerous Weapon; Engaging in Physical Violence in a Restricted Building or Grounds with a Deadly or Dangerous Weapon; Disorderly Conduct in a Capitol Building; Act of Physical Violence in the Capitol Grounds or Buildings	On 10/2/2024, the court dismissed counts 2 and 5: Obstruction and Destruction of Gov't Property. On 10/8/2024, Braun pleaded Guilty to the remaining charges.	Sentencing set for 1/27/2025. On 1/22/2025, the court grants the government's motion to dismiss the case with prejudice	
June 08, 2023	Ethan Aaron Bray	Federal: Civil Disorder; Entering or Remaining in a Restricted Building or Grounds; Disorderly ... in a Restricted Building or Grounds; Disorderly conduct in a Capitol Building; Parading ... in a Capitol Building	Bray pleaded Guilty to two charges: Entering or Remaining in a Restricted Building or Grounds; Parading ... in a Capitol Building. Bench trial verdict on 10/3/2024 finds Bray Guilty on two charges: Civil Disorder and Disorderly ... in a Restricted Building or Grounds. Not Guilty on Disorderly Conduct in a Capitol Building.	Sentencing is set for 2/7/2025. On 1/21/2025, the court grants the government's motion to dismiss the case with prejudice	
June 08, 2023	Toney Sheldon Bray	Federal: Civil Disorder; Theft of Government Property; Entering or Remaining in a Restricted Building or Grounds; Disorderly ... in a Restricted Building or Grounds; Disorderly Conduct in a Capitol Building; Parading ... in a Capitol Building	Bray pleaded Guilty to three charges: Theft of Government Property; Entering or Remaining in a Restricted Building or Grounds; Parading ... in a Capitol Building. Bench trial verdict on 10/3/2024 finds Bray Guilty on two charges: Civil Disorder and Disorderly ... in a Restricted Building or Grounds. Not Guilty on Disorderly Conduct in a Capitol Building.	Sentencing is set for 2/7/2025. On 1/21/2025, the court grants the government's motion to dismiss the case with prejudice	
July 24, 2024	Nathan Erik Breese	Federal: Entering ... in a Restricted Building or Grounds; Disorderly ... in a Restricted Building or Grounds; Disorderly Conduct in a Capitol Building or Grounds; Parading ... in a Capitol Building		On 2/20/2025, the court grants the government's motion to dismiss the case with prejudice.	
May 20, 2021	James Breheny	Federal: Obstruction of an Official Proceeding and Aiding and Abetting	Breheny pleaded Guilty to Obstruction of an Official Proceeding and Aiding and Abetting.	Sentenced on 2/23/2024 to 36 months of probation; the first six months of probation will be served on home detention; special assessment of $100; Restitution in the amount of $2,000; 120 hours of community service.	Breheny received a full pardon on January 20, 2025
January 16, 2025	Frederick Breitfelder	Federal: Assaulting ... Certain Officers; Obstruction of Law Enforcement During Civil Disorder; Entering ...; Disorderly ...; Engaging in Physical Violence in a Restricted Building or Grounds; Disorderly Conduct; Acts of Physical Violence in the Capitol Grounds or Buildings		On 1/22/2025, the court grants the government's motion to dismiss the case with prejudice.	
June 03, 2022	James Brett IV	Federal: Civil Disorder; Entering ... in a Restricted Building or Grounds; Disorderly ... in a Restricted Building or Grounds; Disorderly Conduct in the Capitol Grounds or Buildings	Brett pleaded Not Guilty to all charges. In a Bench trial on 11/14/2024, he pleaded Guilty to three charges. On 11/19/2024, he was found Guilty of Civil Disorder.	Sentencing set for 3/27/2025. On 1/21/2025, the court grants the government's motion to dismiss the case with prejudice.	
October 10, 2023	Paul Thomas Brinson	Federal: Entering ... in a Restricted Building; Disorderly ... in a Restricted Building; Disorderly Conduct in a Capitol Building; Parading ... in a Capitol Building	Brinson pleaded Guilty to two charges: Disorderly Conduct in a Capitol Building; Parading ... in a Capitol Building. The other charges are dismissed.	Sentenced on 11/7/2024 to 30 days incarceration; 12 months probation; $20 special assessment; $500 restitution.	Brinson received a full pardon on January 20, 2025
January 10, 2021	Larry Rendall Brock	Federal: Entering ... Restricted Building or Grounds; Disorderly ... Restricted Building or Grounds; Impeding Ingress and Egress in a Restricted Building or Grounds and Aiding and Abetting; Entering and Remaining on the Floor of Congress; Disorderly Conduct in a Capitol Building; Impeding Passage Through the Capitol Grounds or Buildings and Aiding and Abetting	Guilty – all charges	24 months in prison; two years of probation; 100 hours of community service; $2,000 restitution	53-year-old retired Air Force lieutenant colonel from Grapevine, Texas. One of the two men seen carrying plastic handcuffs as they moved through the Capitol, he was wearing a tactical vest and a green combat helmet. Brock had previously identified himself to The New Yorker and claimed he "found the zip-tie handcuffs on the floor".
June 04, 2024	Tristan Seth Broadrick	Federal: Knowingly Entering or Remaining in any Restricted Building or Grounds Without Lawful Authority; Disorderly ... in a Restricted Building or Grounds; Disorderly Conduct in a Capitol Building or Grounds; Parading ... in a Capitol Building		On 2/20/2025, the court grants the government's motion to dismiss the case with prejudice.	
July 20, 2021	Michael Leon Brock	Federal: Inflicting Bodily Injury on Certain Officers (2 counts); Obstruction of Law Enforcement During Civil Disorder; Disorderly Conduct in a Capitol Building or Grounds; Act of Physical Violence in the Capitol Grounds or Buildings	Brock pleaded Not Guilty to all charges.	On 1/21/2025, the court grants the government's motion to dismiss the case with prejudice	
May 27, 2021	Nicholas James Brockhoff	Federal: Assaulting ... Certain Officers Using a Dangerous Weapon; Civil Disorder; Entering ... in a Restricted Building or Grounds; Disorderly ... in a Restricted Building or Grounds; Disorderly Conduct in a Capitol Building; Act of Physical Violence in the Capitol Grounds or Buildings; Parading ... in a Capitol Building	Brockhoff pleaded Guilty to one charge: Assaulting ... Certain Officers Using a Dangerous Weapon. The other charges are dismissed.	Sentenced on 5/25/2023 to 36 months incarceration; 36 months supervised release; $2,700 restitution; special assessment of $100.	Brockhoff received a full pardon on January 20, 2025
March 11, 2021	Antionne DeShaun Brodnax	Federal: Entering ... in a Restricted Building or Grounds; Disorderly ... in a Restricted Building or Grounds; Disorderly Conduct in a Capitol Building; Parading ... in a Capitol Building	Brodnax pleaded Guilty to all four charges.	Sentenced on 12/19/2022 to 5 months incarceration; 1 year of supervised release; $70 special assessment; $500 restitution.	Brodnax received a full pardon on January 20, 2025
September 15, 2022	Joseph Brody	Federal: Civil Disorder; Assaulting ... Certain Officers	Brody pleaded Guilty to the two charges.	Sentenced on 7/19/2024 to 18 months of incarceration; 3 months of supervised release; $2,000 restitution; $200 special assessment; 50 hours of community service.	Brody received a full pardon on January 20, 2025
February 17, 2021	Phillip Andrew Bromley	Federal: Entering ... in a Restricted Building or Grounds; Disorderly ... in a Restricted Building or Grounds; Disorderly Conduct in a Capitol Building; Parading ... in a Capitol Building	Bromley pleaded Guilty to one charge: Disorderly ... in a Restricted Building or Grounds. The other charges are dismissed.	Sentenced 6/29/2022 to 90 days incarceration; 1 year of supervised release; $2,000 restitution; $2,000 fine; $25 special assessment.	Bromley received a full pardon on January 20, 2025
February 04, 2021	Tammy A. Bronsburg	Federal: Entering ... in a Restricted Building; Disorderly ... in a Restricted Building; Violent Entry and Disorderly Conduct in a Capitol Building; Parading ... in a Capitol Building	Bronsburg pleaded Guilty to one charge: Parading ... in a Capitol Building. The other charges are dismissed.	Sentenced on 1/5/2023 to 20 days incarceration; 24 months probation; $500 restitution; $10 special assessment.	Bronsburg received a full pardon on January 20, 2025
July 29, 2021	Glenn Allen Brooks	Federal: Entering ... in a Restricted Building or Grounds; Disorderly ... in a Restricted Building or Grounds; Disorderly ... in a Capitol Building or Grounds; Parading ... in a Capitol Building	Brooks pleaded Not Guilty to all charges. Found Guilty in a Jury trial on 5/10/2024 on all charges.	Sentenced on 9/13/2024 to 6 months incarceration; 12 months supervised release; restitution of $500; a fine of $2,000; special assessment of $150; 60 hours of community service.	Brooks received a full pardon on January 20, 2025
January 05, 2022	James Wayne Brooks	Federal: Entering ... in a Restricted Building or Grounds; Disorderly ... in a Restricted Building or Grounds; Disorderly Conduct in a Capitol Building; Parading ... in a Capitol Building	Brooks pleaded Guilty to one charge: Entering ... in a Restricted Building or Grounds. The other charges are dismissed.	Sentenced 11/3/2022 to 12 months of Probation; Special Assessment of $25; Restitution of $500; 60 hours community service.	Brooks received a full pardon on January 20, 2025
June 30, 2021	Gabriel Morgan Brown	Federal: Disorderly ... in a Restricted Building or Grounds; Act of Physical Violence on U.S. Capitol Grounds	Brown pleaded Guilty to both charges.	Sentenced on 7/12/2023 to 20 Days Incarceration; supervised Release of 1 Year; Special Assessment of $35; Restitution of $500; 60 hours of community service.	Brown received a full pardon on January 20, 2025
August 26, 2021	Jeffrey Scott Brown	Federal: Civil Disorder; Assaulting ... Certain Officers Using a Dangerous Weapon and Aiding and Abetting; Entering ... in a Restricted Building or Grounds with a Deadly or Dangerous Weapon; Disorderly ... in a Restricted Building for Grounds with a Deadly or Dangerous Weapon; Engaging in Physical Violence in a Restricted Building or Grounds with a Deadly or Dangerous Weapon; Disorderly Conduct in the Capitol Grounds or Buildings; Act of Physical Violence in the Capitol Grounds or Buildings	Brown pleaded Not Guilty to all charges. On 12/6/2022 he was convicted in a jury trial and found guilty on all charges.	Sentenced on 4/28/2023 to 54 months of incarceration; 36 months of supervised release; $520 special assessment; $2,000 restitution.	Brown received a full pardon on January 20, 2025
September 30, 2021	Jeremy Michael Brown	Federal: entering restricted grounds and disruptive conduct			Brown previously served in the U.S. Army Special Forces. In the Jan 6. footage, he was identified by his military helmet, vest and radio. In a home search the day of Brown's arrest, federal agents said they found unregistered and modified weapons that violated federal law, a 10-inch barreled AR-15 rifle, a sawed-off shotgun and two grenades. Agents also said they found a military report with classified information about a soldier who had been missing in Afghanistan. He was found guilty by a federal court jury in December 2022 and charged with possession of unregistered short-barrel firearms, possession of unregistered explosive grenades, improper storage of explosive grenades, and retention of classified information. Brown's case has drawn attention on social media from conservative pundit Lara Logan, on the website whoisjeremybrown.com and from Cathi Chamberlain, Brown's campaign manager when he ran to represent Florida House District 62 in 2022.
June 12, 2023	Keith Brown	Federal: Parading ... in a Capitol Building	Brown pleaded Guilty to the charge.	Sentenced on 9/15/2023 to 36 months probation; 10 days intermittent confinement; 60 days location monitoring; $10 special assessment; $500 restitution; $2,500 fine.	Brown received a full pardon on January 20, 2025
January 11, 2021	Terry Lee Brown	Federal: Entering ... Restricted Building; Disorderly ... Restricted Building; Violent Entry and Disorderly Conduct in a Capitol Building; Parading ... in a Capitol Building	Guilty – one charge: Parading ... in a Capitol Building. The other charges were dismissed.	Sentenced to 30 days of home detention and three years of probation	
July 01, 2021	Trevor Brown	Federal: Civil Disorder and Aiding and Abetting; Entering ... in a Restricted Building or Grounds; Disorderly ... in a Restricted Building or Grounds; Disorderly Conduct in a Capitol Building	Brown pleaded Not Guilty to all charges.	Bench trial set for 2/3/2025. On 1/22/2025, the court grants the government's motion to dismiss the case with prejudice.	
March 30, 2021	Marc Anthony Bru	Federal: Entering ... in a Restricted Building or Grounds; Disorderly ... in a Restricted Building or Grounds; Entering ... in the Gallery of Congress; Disorderly Conduct in Capitol Grounds or Buildings; Parading ... in a Capitol Building; Civil Disorder; Obstruction of an Official Proceeding	Bru pleaded Not Guilty to all charges. Found Guilty in a Bench trial on 10/3/2023 on all charges.	Sentenced on 1/24/2024 to 72 months incarceration; 3 years supervised release; $280 special assessment; $2,000 restitution; $7,946 fine. On 9/9/2024, the USCA vacated the Obstruction conviction. Re-sentenced on 11/22/2024 to 60 months incarceration; 3 years Supervised Release; fine of $7,946, Special Assessments of $180; Restitution of $2,000.	Bru received a full pardon on January 20, 2025
August 16, 2023	Ronald Alfred Bryan	Federal: Civil Disorder; Assaulting ... Certain Officers (2 counts); Theft of Government Property; Entering ... in a Restricted Building or Grounds; Disorderly ... in a Restricted Building or Grounds; Engaging in Physical Violence in a Restricted Building or Grounds; An Act of Physical Violence in the Capitol Grounds or Buildings	Bryan pleaded Guilty to two charges: Civil Disorder; Assaulting ... Certain Officers.	Sentencing set for 1/28/2025. On 1/22/2025, the court grants the government's motion to dismiss the case with prejudice.	
September 17, 2021	Matthew Joseph Buckler	Federal: Parading ... in a Capitol Building	Buckler pleaded Guilty to Parading ... in a Capitol Building.	Sentenced 7/21/2022 to 14 days of home detention, 24 months of probation, 60 hours of community service, $500 restitution; $10 special assessment.	Buckler received a full pardon on January 20, 2025
July 30, 2021	Janet West Buhler	Federal: Entering ... in a Restricted Building; Disorderly ... in a Restricted Building; Entering ... in the Gallery of Congress; Violent Entry and Disorderly Conduct in a Capitol Building; Parading ... in a Capitol Building	Buhler pleaded Guilty to one charge: Parading ... in a Capitol Building. The other charges are dismissed.	Sentenced 6/1/2022 to 30 days incarceration, 36 months probation, $500 in restitution, $10 special assessment.	Buhler received a full pardon on January 20, 2025
August 19, 2021	Benjamen Scott Burlew	Federal: Civil Disorder; Assaulting ... Certain Officers; Entering ... in Restricted Grounds; Disorderly ... in a Restricted Grounds; Physical Violence in Restricted Grounds; Act of Physical Violence in the Capitol Grounds; Striking, Beating, or Wounding of Another Person within the Territorial Jurisdiction; Simple Assault within the Territorial Jurisdiction	Burlew pleaded Guilty to one charge: Assaulting ... Certain Officers.	Sentencing reset for 1/16/2025. On 1/21/2025, the court grants the government's motion to dismiss the case with prejudice.	
August 19, 2021	Gabriel Burress	Federal: Parading ... in a Capitol Building	Burress pleaded Guilty to the charge.	Sentenced to 18 months probation; 45 days location monitoring/home detention; 60 hours community service; $10 special assessment; $500 restitution.	Burress received a full pardon on January 20, 2025
October 07, 2024	Brien Arin Burton	Federal: Assaulting ... Certain Officers; Civil Disorder; Entering or Remaining in a restricted Building or Grounds; Disorderly ... in a Restricted Building or Grounds; Act of Physical Violence in a Restricted Building or Grounds; Disorderly Conduct in a Capitol Building or Grounds; Act of Physical Violence in the Capitol Grounds or Buildings		On 1/21/2025, the court grants the government's motion to dismiss the case with prejudice.	
March 08, 2021	Jessica Louise Bustle	Federal: Entering ... in a Restricted Building or Grounds; Disorderly ... in a Restricted Building or Grounds; Disorderly Conduct in a Capitol Building; Parading ... in a Capitol Building	Bustle pleaded Guilty to: Parading ... in Capitol Buildings; the other charges were dismissed.	Sentenced to 24 Months of Probation, which includes 60 days of home confinement; and 40 hours of community service; Special Assessment of $10 and Restitution of $500.	Bustle received a full pardon on January 20, 2025
March 08, 2021	Joshua Kahle Bustle	Federal: Entering ... in a Restricted Building or Grounds; Disorderly ... in a Restricted Building or Grounds; Disorderly Conduct in a Capitol Building; Parading ... in a Capitol Building	Bustle pleaded Guilty to: Parading ... in Capitol Buildings; the other charges were dismissed.	Sentenced 8/4/2021 to 24 Months of Probation; 30 days of home confinement; and 40 hours of community service; Special Assessment of $10; and Restitution of $500.	Bustle received a full pardon on January 20, 2025
November 18, 2021	Alexis Ivan Bustos	Federal: Entering ... in a Restricted Building or Grounds; Disorderly ... in a Restricted Building or Grounds; Disorderly Conduct in a Capitol Building; Parading ... in a Capitol Building	Bustos pleaded Guilty to one charge: Parading ... in a Capitol Building. The other charges are dismissed.	Sentenced on 2/15/2023 to 24 months of Probation; 30 hours community service; $500 Restitution; $10 Special Assessment.	Bustos received a full pardon on January 20, 2025
November 17, 2021	Bryan Emmanuel Bustos	Federal: Entering ... in a Restricted Building or Grounds; Disorderly ... in a Restricted Building or Grounds; Disorderly Conduct in a Capitol Building; Parading ... in a Capitol Building	Bustos pleaded Guilty to one charge: Parading ... in a Capitol Building. The other charges are dismissed.	Sentenced on 2/15/2023 to 24 months of Probation; 30 hours of community service; $500 Restitution; $10 Special Assessment.	Bustos received a full pardon on January 20, 2025
June 23, 2021	Jamie N Buteau	Federal: Civil Disorder; Assaulting ... Certain Officers; Entering ... in a Restricted Building or Grounds; Disorderly ... in a Restricted Building or Grounds; Engaging in Physical Violence in a Restricted Building or Grounds; Disorderly Conduct in a Capitol Building; Act of Physical Violence in the Capitol Grounds or Buildings; Parading ... in a Capitol Building	Buteau pleaded Guilty to one charge: Assaulting ... Certain Officers. The other charges are dismissed.	Sentenced on 11/20/2023 to 22 months incarceration; 24 months of supervised release; $100 special assessment; $2,000 restitution.	Buteau received a full pardon on January 20, 2025
June 23, 2021	Jennifer Peck Buteau	Federal: Entering ... in a Restricted Building or Grounds; Disorderly ... in a Restricted Building or Grounds; Disorderly Conduct in a Capitol Building; Parading Demonstrating or Picketing in a Capitol Building	Buteau pleaded Guilty to one charge: Parading Demonstrating or Picketing in a Capitol Building. The other charges are dismissed.	Sentenced on 11/20/2023 to 90 days incarceration; $10 special assessment; $500 restitution.	Buteau received a full pardon on January 20, 2025
December 09, 2021	Jonas Buxton	Federal: Entering ... in a Restricted Building or Grounds; Disorderly ... in a Restricted Building or Grounds; Disorderly Conduct in a Capitol Building; Parading ... in a Capitol Building	Buxton pleaded Guilty to one charge: Parading ... in a Capitol Building. The other charges are dismissed.	Sentenced 12/2/2022 to 18 months of probation, including 40 hours of community service, $500 fine, $500 restitution; special assessment of $10.	Buxton received a full pardon on January 20, 2025
July 07, 2021	Alan William Byerly	Federal: Civil Disorder; Assaulting ... Certain Officers Using a Deadly or Dangerous Weapon; Entering ... in a Restricted Grounds Using and Carrying a Deadly or Dangerous Weapon; Disorderly ... in a Restricted Grounds Using and Carrying a Deadly or Dangerous Weapon; Physical Violence in Restricted Grounds Using and Carrying a Deadly or Dangerous Weapon; Act of Physical Violence in the Capitol Grounds; Striking, Beating or Wounding of Another Person within the Territorial Jurisdiction; Simple Assault within the Territorial Jurisdiction	Byerly pleaded Guilty to two charges: Assaulting ... Certain Officers; and Striking, Beating or Wounding of Another Person within the Territorial Jurisdiction. The other charges are dismissed.	Sentenced on 10/21/2021 to 34 months incarceration; 3 years of supervised release; $125 Special Assessment.	Byerly received a full pardon on January 20, 2025
June 26, 2023	Trevor F. Cain	Federal: Obstruction of an Official Proceeding; Entering ... in a Restricted Building or Grounds; Disorderly ... in a Restricted Building or Grounds; Disorderly Conduct in a Restricted Building or Grounds; Parading ... in any of the Capitol Buildings	Cain pleaded Guilty to two charges: Entering ... in a Restricted Building or Grounds; Parading ... in any of the Capitol Buildings.	Sentencing is reset for 1/31/2025. On 1/21/2025, the court grants the government's motion to dismiss the case with prejudice	
February 10, 2021	Daniel Ray Caldwell	Federal: Civil Disorder; Assaulting ... Certain Officers Using a Dangerous Weapon; Entering ... in a Restricted Building or Grounds with a Deadly or Dangerous Weapon; Disorderly ... in a Restricted Building or Grounds with a Deadly or Dangerous Weapon; Engaging in Physical Violence in a Restricted Building or Grounds with a Deadly or Dangerous Weapon; Disorderly Conduct in a Capitol Building; Act of Physical Violence in the Capitol Grounds or Buildings	Caldwell pleaded Guilty to one charge: Assaulting ... Certain Officers Using a Dangerous Weapon. The other charges are dismissed.	Sentenced on 2/1/2023 to 68 months incarceration with credit for time served; 36 months supervised release; $2,000 restitution; $100 special assessment.	Caldwell received a full pardon on January 20, 2025
January 19, 2021	Thomas Edward Caldwell	Federal: Conspiracy; Obstruction of an Official Proceeding and Aiding and Abetting; Destruction of Government Property and Aiding and Abetting; Entering ... Restricted Building or Grounds; Tampering with Documents or Proceedings	Not Guilty – all charges	Sentenced to 68 months' incarceration, 36 months' supervised release, $2,000 restitution	Member of Oath Keepers. One of the three who were indicted for conspiracy for planning their activities, alongside Jessica Watkins and Donovan Crowl. Found guilty on 29 November 2022 of obstruction of an official proceeding, and tampering with documents or proceedings.
January 15, 2021	William McCall Calhoun Jr.	Federal: Obstruction of an Official Proceeding; Entering ... in a Restricted Building or Grounds; Disorderly ... in a Restricted Building or Grounds; Disorderly Conduct in a Capitol Building; Parading ... in a Capitol Building	Calhoun pleaded Not Guilty to all charges. Found Guilty on all charges in a Bench trial on 3/21/2023.	Sentenced on 8/4/2023 to 18 months of incarceration; 24 months of supervised release; $2,000 restitution; $170 special assessment. On 10/28/2024, the USCA vacated the Obstruction conviction. On 1/22/2025, the court grants the government's motion to dismiss the case with prejudice.	
December 06, 2023	Paul J. Caloia	Federal: Entering ... in a Restricted Building or Grounds; Disorderly ... in a Restricted Building or Grounds; Disorderly Conduct in a Capitol Building; Parading ... in a Capitol Building	Caloia pleaded Guilty to two charges: Disorderly Conduct in a Capitol Building; Parading ... in a Capitol Building. The other charges are dismissed.	Sentenced on 10/23/2024 to 24 months probation; 60 days location monitoring; $500 restitution; $20 special assessment; 60 hours of community service.	Caloia received a full pardon on January 20, 2025
January 20, 2021	Samuel Pinho Camargo	Federal: Civil Disorder; Assaulting ... Certain Officers; Entering ... in a Restricted Building or Grounds; Disorderly ... in a Restricted Building or Grounds; Engaging in Physical Violence in a Restricted Building or Grounds; Disorderly Conduct in a Capitol Building; Act of Physical Violence in the Capitol Grounds or Buildings	Camargo pleaded Not Guilty to all charges. Bench trial held 4/16-4/18/2024. Verdict on 8/8/2024 for counts 1s-4s and 6s: Guilty on count 3: Entering ... in a Restricted Building or Grounds; and Guilty of Lesser Offense count 2: Misdemeanor, Simple Assault. Not Guilty on counts 1, 4 and 6.	Sentenced on 10/21/2024 to Time Served followed by 6 months of Supervised Release; $50 Special Assessment; $500 Restitution.	Camargo received a full pardon on January 20, 2025
July 01, 2024	David Michael Camden	Federal: Assaulting ... Certain Officers	Camden pleaded Guilty to the single charge.	Sentenced on 1/10/2025 to 12 months and one day incarceration; 12 months of supervised release; $100 Special Assessment; $2,000 Restitution; $5,000 fine.	Camden received a full pardon on January 20, 2025
January 05, 2022	John M. Cameron	Federal: Entering ... in a Restricted Building or Grounds; Disorderly ... in a Restricted Building or Grounds; Disorderly Conduct in a Capitol Building; Parading ... in a Capitol Building	Cameron pleaded Guilty to one charge: Parading ... in a Capitol Building. The other charges are dismissed.	Sentenced on 8/15/2022 to 36 months of Probation; 30 days intermittent confinement; Special Assessment of $10; Fine of $1,000; Restitution of $500.	Cameron received a full pardon on January 20, 2025
June 09, 2023	Cameron Campanella II	Federal: Entering ... in a Restricted Building or Grounds; Disorderly ... in a Restricted Building or Grounds; Disorderly Conduct in a Capitol Building or Grounds; Parading ... in a Capitol Building	Campanella pleaded Guilty to two charges: Disorderly Conduct in a Capitol Building or Grounds; Parading ... in a Capitol Building. The other charges are dismissed.	Sentenced on 1/23/2024 to 12 months probation; $20 special assessment; $500 restitution.	Campanella received a full pardon on January 20, 2025
April 17, 2024	Tyler Campanella	Federal: Obstruction of an Official Proceeding; Entering ... in a Restricted Building or Grounds; Disorderly ... in a Restricted Building or Grounds; Entering ... in a Gallery of Congress; Disorderly Conduct in a Capitol Building; Parading ... in a Capitol Building	Campanella pleaded Not Guilty to all charges.	On 1/27/2025, the court grants the government's motion to dismiss the case with prejudice.	
December 11, 2023	Kyle Andrew Campbell	Federal: Assaulting ... Certain Officers	Campbell pleaded Guilty to one charge: Assaulting ... Certain Officers.	Sentenced on 10/31/2024 to 4 months incarceration; 4 months of home confinement; 36 months of supervised release; $2,000 in restitution; $100 special assessment; 60 hours of community service.	Campbell received a full pardon on January 20, 2025
March 12, 2021	Boyd Allen Camper	Federal: Knowingly Entering ... Restricted Building or Grounds Without Lawful Authority; Knowingly Engaging in Disorderly or Disruptive Conduct in Restricted Building or Grounds; Engaging in Disorderly or Disruptive Conduct on the Capitol Buildings or Grounds; Parading ... in Capitol Buildings	Guilty – one charge: Parading ... in Capitol Buildings. The other charges have been dropped.	Sentenced to 60 days in jail and $500 restitution	
March 10, 2022	Eric Andrew Cantrell	Federal: Entering ... in a Restricted Building or Grounds; Disorderly ... in a Restricted Building or Grounds; Disorderly Conduct in a Capitol Building; Parading ... in a Capitol Building	Eric Cantrell pleaded Guilty to one charge: Parading ... in a Capitol Building. The other charges are dismissed.	Sentenced on 3/27/2023 to 3 Months Probation; 40 hours of community service; $10 Special Assessment; Restitution in the amount of $500; Fine in the amount of $1,000.	Cantrell received a full pardon on January 20, 2025
March 10, 2022	Jared Paul Cantrell	Federal: Entering ... in a Restricted Building or Grounds; Disorderly ... in a Restricted Building or Grounds; Disorderly Conduct in a Capitol Building or Grounds; Parading ... in a Capitol Building	Jared Cantrell pleaded Not Guilty to all charges. Found Guilty in a Bench trial on 4/4/2023 of three counts: Entering ... in a Restricted Building; Disorderly ... in a Restricted Building; Parading ... in a Capitol Building. Found Not Guilty on one count: Disorderly or Disruptive Conduct in a U.S. Capitol Building or Grounds.	Sentenced on 6/26/2023 to 6 Months of Incarceration; 12 Months of Supervised Release; 4 Months of Home Incarceration; Special Assessment of $60; Restitution of $500; Fine of $8,000; 100 hours of community service.	Cantrell received a full pardon on January 20, 2025
March 10, 2022	Quentin G. Cantrell	Federal: Entering ... in a Restricted Building or Grounds; Disorderly ... in a Restricted Building or Grounds; Disorderly Conduct in a Capitol Building; Parading ... in a Capitol Building	Quentin Cantrell pleaded Not Guilty to all charges. Found Guilty in a Bench trial on 4/4/2023 on two counts: Entering ... in a Restricted Building or Grounds and Parading ... in a Capitol Building. Found Not Guilty on the other two counts.	Sentenced on 6/26/2023 to 12 Months of Probation; 6 days of intermittent confinement; Special Assessment of $35; Restitution of $500; Fine of $6,000; 100 hours of community service.	Cantrell received a full pardon on January 20, 2025
February 18, 2021	Lewis Easton Cantwell	Federal: Civil Disorder; Obstruction of an Official Proceeding; Entering ... in a Restricted Building and Grounds; Disorderly ... in a Restricted Building and Grounds; Disorderly ... in a Capitol Building and Ground; Parading ... in a Capitol Building	Cantwell pleaded Guilty to one count: Civil Disorder. The other charges are dismissed.	Sentenced on 12/6/2022 to 5 months incarceration; 3 years of supervised release; $2,000 in restitution; $100 special assessment.	Cantwell received a full pardon on January 20, 2025
August 10, 2021	Steven Cappuccio	Federal: Assaulting ... Certain Officers and Aiding and Abetting; Assaulting ... Certain Officers Using a Dangerous Weapon; Robbery and Aiding and Abetting (baton); Obstruction of an Official Proceeding and Aiding and Abetting; Civil Disorder; Disorderly ... in a Restricted Building or Grounds with a Deadly or Dangerous Weapon; Engaging in Physical Violence in a Restricted Building or Grounds with a Deadly or Dangerous Weapon; Disorderly Conduct in a Capitol Building; Act of Physical Violence in the Capitol Grounds or Buildings	Cappuccio pleaded Not Guilty to all charges. Bench trial held from 7/14/2023-7/20/2023 found him Guilty on seven counts and Not Guilty on two counts: Obstruction of an Official Proceeding and Disorderly Conduct in a Capitol Building.	Sentenced on 11/3/2023 to 85 months incarceration; 24 months supervised release; Special Assessment of $610; Restitution of $2,000.	Cappuccio received a full pardon on January 20, 2025
January 26, 2021	Mathew Capsel	Federal: Civil Disorder	Capsel pleaded Guilty to the single charge.	Sentenced on 12/16/2022 to 18 months incarceration; 24 months of Supervised Release; Special Assessment of $100 and Restitution of $2,000.	Capsel received a full pardon on January 20, 2025
February 28, 2024	Lin Marie Carey	Federal: Obstruction of an Official Proceeding; Entering ... in a Restricted Building or Grounds; Disorderly ... in a Restricted Building or Grounds; Disorderly Conduct in a Capitol Building; Parading, Picketing, and Demonstrating in a Capitol Building	Carey pleaded Not Guilty to all charges.	On 1/22/2025, the court grants the government's motion to dismiss the case with prejudice	
September 15, 2022	Thomas Carey	Federal: Parading ... in a Capitol Building	Carey pleaded Guilty to the single charge.	Sentenced on 6/6/2023 to 36 Months probation; 14 days intermittent confinement; Special Assessment of $10; restitution of $500.	Carey received a full pardon on January 20, 2025
August 11, 2021	Michael Aaron Carico	Federal: Entering ... in a Restricted Building or Grounds; Disorderly ... in a Restricted Building or Grounds; Disorderly Conduct in a Capitol Building; Parading ... in a Capitol Building	Carico pleaded Guilty to one charge: Parading ... in a Capitol Building. The other charges are dismissed.	Sentenced 3/11/2022 to 24 months of Probation; 60 days of location monitoring/home detention; $10 Special Assessment; $500 Fine; Restitution of $500; 60 hours of community service.	Carico received a full pardon on January 20, 2025
August 15, 2024	John Joseph Carl	Federal: Civil Disorder; Assaulting ... Certain Officers; Entering ... in a Restricted Building or Grounds; Disorderly ... in a Restricted Building or Grounds; Engaging in Physical Violence in a Restricted Building or Grounds; Disorderly Conduct in a Capitol Building; Act of Physical Violence in the Capitol Grounds or Buildings; Parading ... in a Capitol Building	Carl pleaded Not Guilty to all charges.	On 1/21/2025, the court grants the government's motion to dismiss the case with prejudice	
March 11, 2021	Jonathan Daniel Carlton	Federal: Obstruction of an Official Proceeding; Entering ... in a Restricted Building or Grounds; Disorderly ... in a Restricted Building or Grounds; Disorderly Conduct in a Capitol Building; Parading ... in a Capitol Building	Carlton pleaded Guilty to one charge: Parading ... in a Capitol Building. The other charges are dismissed.	Sentenced on 8/26/2022 to 36 Months of Probation; 40 hours community service; Special Assessment of $10; Restitution of $500.	Carlton received a full pardon on January 20, 2025
March 02, 2023	Christopher Carnell	Federal: Obstruction of an Official Proceeding and Aiding and Abetting; Entering ... in a Restricted Building or Grounds; Disorderly ... in a Restricted Building or Grounds; Entering ... on the Floor of Congress; Disorderly Conduct in a Capitol Building; Parading ... in a Capitol Building	Carnell pleaded Not Guilty to all charges. Found Guilty on all charges in a Stipulated Bench trial on 2/12/2024. On 10/7/2024, the court vacated the Obstruction conviction.	Sentenced on 12/13/2024 to 6 Months Incarceration; 12 Months Of Supervised Release (With Conditions); Fine Of $2,500; Restitution of $500; Special Assessment oF $80.	Carnell received a full pardon on January 20, 2025
January 19, 2022	Anthony Carollo	Federal: Entering ... in a Restricted Building or Grounds; Disorderly ... in a Restricted Building or Grounds; Disorderly Conduct in a Capitol Building; Parading ... in a Capitol Building	Carollo pleaded Guilty to one charge: Parading ... in a Capitol Building. The other charges are dismissed.	Sentenced on 9/13/2022 to 12 Months of Probation; $10 Special Assessment; restitution in the amount of $500; 60 hours of community service.	Carollo received a full pardon on January 20, 2025
January 19, 2022	Jeremiah Carollo	Federal: Entering ... in a Restricted Building or Grounds; Disorderly ... in a Restricted Building or Grounds; Disorderly Conduct in a Capitol Building; Parading ... in a Capitol Building	Carollo pleaded Guilty to one charge: Parading ... in a Capitol Building. The other charges are dismissed.	Sentenced to 12 Months of Probation; the first 21 days of Probation, the defendant will be incarcerated; $10 Special Assessment; Restitution of $500; 60 hours of community service.	Carollo received a full pardon on January 20, 2025
March 23, 2021	Sara Carpenter	Federal: Civil Disorder; Obstruction of an Official Proceeding; Entering ... in a Restricted Building or Grounds; Disorderly ... in a Restricted Building or Grounds; Disorderly Conduct in a Capitol Building; Impeding Passage Through the Capitol Grounds or Buildings; Parading ... in a Capitol Building	Carpenter pleaded Not Guilty to all charges. Found Guilty in a Jury trial on 3/9/2023 on all charges.	Sentenced on 12/19/2023 to 22 months incarceration; 24 months of Supervised Release; Special assessment totaling $280; Restitution of $2,000.	Carpenter received a full pardon on January 20, 2025
February 20, 2024	Andrew Roman Carvajal	Federal: Entering ... in a Restricted Building or Grounds; Disorderly ... in a Restricted Building or Grounds; Disorderly Conduct in a Capitol Building; Parading ... in a Capitol Building	Carvajal pleaded Not Guilty to all charges. Plea Agreement Hearing set for 1/28/2025.	On 1/23/2025, the court grants the government's motion to dismiss the case with prejudice.	
January 30, 2024	Matthew Brent Carver	Federal: Assaulting ... Certain Officers; Civil Disorder; Entering ... in a Restricted Building or Grounds; Disorderly ... in a Restricted Building or Grounds; Engaging in Physical Violence in a Restricted Building or Grounds; Disorderly Conduct in a Capitol Building; Act of Physical Violence in the Capitol Grounds or Buildings	Carver pleaded Guilty to one charge: Civil Disorder.	Sentencing set for 3/5/2025. On 1/21/2025, the court grants the government's motion to dismiss the case with prejudice.	
August 30, 2023	Todd Branden Casey	Federal: Civil Disorder; Assaulting ... Certain Officers; Entering ... in a Restricted Building or Grounds; Disorderly ... in a Restricted Building or Grounds; Engaging in Physical Violence in a Restricted Building or Grounds; Impeding Passage Through the Capitol Grounds or Buildings; Act of Physical Violence in the Capitol Grounds or Buildings	Casey pleaded Not Guilty to all charges.	Jury trial set for 2/3/2025. On 1/21/2025, the court grants the government's motion to dismiss the case with prejudice.	
March 28, 2023	Thomas Andrew Casselman	Federal: Assaulting ... Certain Officers	Casselman pleaded Guilty to the charge.	Sentenced on 7/18/2024 to 40 months incarceration; 36 months of supervised release; $2,000 in restitution; $100 special assessment.	Casselman received a full pardon on January 20, 2025
June 01, 2022	Trudy Castle	Federal: Parading ... in a Capitol Building	Castle pleaded guilty to Parading ... in a Capitol Building.	Sentenced 11/22/2022 to 30 months of probation, $2,000 fine, $500 restitution; $10 special assessment.	Castle received a full pardon on January 20, 2025
January 21, 2021	Mariposa Castro	Federal: Entering ... in a Restricted Building; Disorderly ... in a Restricted Building; Violent Entry and Disorderly Conduct in a Capitol Building; Parading ... in a Capitol Building	Castro pleaded Guilty to one charge: Parading ... in a Capitol Building. The other charges are dismissed.	Sentenced 2/23/2022 to 45 days of incarceration; Special Assessment of $10; fine of $5,000.	Castro received a full pardon on January 20, 2025
September 07, 2023	Joseph Cattani	Federal: Civil Disorder; Assaulting ... Certain Officers; Entering ... in a Restricted Building or Grounds; Disorderly ... in a Restricted Building or Grounds; Disorderly Conduct in a Capitol Building; Parading, Picketing, Demonstrating, or Picketing in a Capitol Building	Cattani pleaded Not Guilty to all charges. Jury Trial set for 7/7/2025.	On 1/21/2025, the court grants the government's motion to dismiss the case with prejudice.	
March 16, 2021	Andrew Michael Cavanaugh	Federal: Entering ... in a Restricted Building; Disorderly ... in a Restricted Building; Violent Entry and Disorderly Conduct in a Capitol Building; Parading ... in a Capitol Building	Cavanaugh pleaded Guilty to one charge: Parading ... in a Capitol Building. The other charges are dismissed.	Sentenced 8/4/2022 to 24 months of probation, 60 hours of community service, $500 restitution; $10 special assessment.	Cavanaugh received a full pardon on January 20, 2025
August 25, 2022	Brandon Cavanaugh	Federal: Parading ... in a Capitol Building	Cavanaugh pleaded Guilty to the charge.	Sentenced on 4/26/2023 to 24 Months Probation; 14 days of intermittent confinement; $10 Special Assessment; Restitution of $500; Fine of $1,000.	Cavanaugh received a full pardon on January 20, 2025
March 09, 2022	Ralph Joseph Celentano III	Federal: Assaulting ... Certain Officers; Civil Disorder; Entering ... in a Restricted Building or Grounds; Disorderly ... in a Restricted Building or Grounds; Engaging in Physical Violence in a Restricted Building or Grounds; Act of Physical Violence in the Capitol Grounds or Buildings; Obstruction of an Official Proceeding	Celentano pleaded Not Guilty to all charges. In a Jury trial on 6/12/2023, he was found Guilty on six charges and Not Guilty on one: Obstruction of an Official Proceeding.	Sentenced on 1/30/2024 to 78 months incarceration; 36 months supervised release; $285 total Special Assessment.	Celentano received a full pardon on January 20, 2025
April 11, 2024	Jack Chambers	Federal: Entering ... in a Restricted Building or Grounds; Disorderly ... in a Restricted Building or Grounds; Disorderly Conduct in a Capitol Building; Parading ... in a Capitol Building	Chambers pleaded Guilty to two charges: Disorderly Conduct in a Capitol Building; Parading ... in a Capitol Building.	Sentenced on 11/1/2024 to 30 Months of Probation; Special Assessment of $20; Fine of $500; Restitution of $500.	Chambers received a full pardon on January 20, 2025
August 24, 2023	Raymond Earl Chambers II	Federal: Entering ... in a Restricted Building or Grounds; Disorderly ... in a Restricted Building or Grounds; Disorderly Conduct in a Capitol Building or Grounds; Parading ... in a Capitol Building	Chambers pleaded Not Guilty to all charges. Found Guilty on all charges in a Jury trial on 3/20/2024.	Sentenced on 6/24/2024 to 7 months of incarceration; 1 year of supervised release; $500 restitution; $70 special assessment.	Chambers received a full pardon on January 20, 2025
September 21, 2021	Mick Chan	Federal: Entering ... in a Restricted Building or Grounds; Disorderly ... in a Restricted Building or Grounds; Disorderly Conduct in a Capitol Building; Parading ... in a Capitol Building	Chan pleaded Not Guilty to all charges. Bench trial verdict on 1/24/2023 found him Guilty on three charges: Entering ... in a Restricted Building or Grounds, Disorderly ... in a Restricted Building or Grounds, and Parading ... in a Capitol Building. Found Not Guilty on one charge: Disorderly Conduct in a Capitol Building.	Sentenced on 5/5/2023 to 3 Months of Incarceration; 12 Months of Supervised Release; 5 months of home detention; Special Assessment of $60; Restitution of $500; 60 hours of community service.	Chan received a full pardon on January 20, 2025
October 19, 2021	Julio Cesar Chang	Federal: Entering ... in a Restricted Building or Grounds; Disorderly ... in a Restricted Building or Grounds; Disorderly Conduct in a Capitol Building; Parading ... in a Capitol Building	Chang pleaded Guilty to one charge: Parading ... in a Capitol Building. The other charges are dismissed.	Sentenced on 10/6/2023 to 36 months of Probation; 45 days of home detention/location monitoring; $500 Restitution; and $10 Special Assessment.	Chang received a full pardon on January 20, 2025
January 9, 2021	Jacob Anthony Chansley (Jake Angeli; QAnon Shaman)	Federal: Civil Disorder; Obstruction of an Official Proceeding; Entering ... Restricted Building; Disorderly ... Restricted Building or Grounds; Violent Entry and Disorderly Conduct on in a Capitol Building; Parading ... in a Capitol Building	Guilty – one charge: Obstruction of an Official Proceeding. The other charges were dropped. (September 3, 2021)	41 months in jail. Date: November 17, 2021	Pictured in many widely shared photos shirtless, wearing facepaint and a horned fur headdress, and carrying a spear. Angeli's lawyer claimed that Angeli believed himself to have acted "at the invitation of our president," since Trump had stated at the rally that he would accompany protesters to the Capitol (though he ultimately did not), and that Trump therefore ought to pardon Angeli directly. On January 14 prosecutors alleged that his participation was part of a failed plot "to capture and assassinate elected officials." On July 20, 2023, a judge rejected his request to have his conviction thrown out.
April 22, 2021	Robert C. Chapman	Federal: Parading ... in a Capitol Building	Chapman pleaded Guilty to the charge.	Sentenced on 5/18/2022 to 18 months of probation with 3 months location monitoring; 60 hours community service; Special Assessment $10; Restitution $500; Fine: $742.	Chapman received a full pardon on January 20, 2025
May 30, 2024	Jamie Charlesworth	Federal: Entering or Remaining in a Restricted Building or Grounds; Disorderly or Disruptive Conduct in a Restricted Building or Grounds; Disorderly Conduct in a Capitol Building; Parading ... in a Capitol Building	Charlesworth pleaded Not Guilty to all charges.	On 1/21/2025, the court grants the government's motion to dismiss the case with prejudice.	
September 20, 2022	Gabriel Chase	Federal: Parading ... in a Capitol Building	Chase pleaded Guilty to the single charge.	Sentenced on 7/5/2023 to 36 months probation; 3 days intermittent confinement $10 special assessment; $500 restitution.	Chase received a full pardon on January 20, 2025
January 18, 2022	Stefanie Nicole Chiguer	Federal: Entering ... in a Restricted Building or Grounds; Disorderly ... in a Restricted Building or Grounds; Disorderly Conduct in a Capitol Building; Parading ... in a Capitol Building	Chiguer pleaded Guilty to one charge: Parading ... in a Capitol Building. The other charges are dismissed.	Sentenced on 6/9/2023 to 24 months probation; 120 hours of community service; $500 restitution; $10 special assessment. On 10/22/2024, the court terminated probation.	Chiguer received a full pardon on January 20, 2025
August 11, 2022	Donald Chilcoat	Federal: Obstruction of an Official Proceeding and Aiding and Abetting; Entering ... in a Restricted Building or Grounds; Disorderly ... in a Restricted Building or Grounds; Entering ... on the Floor of Congress; Disorderly Conduct on Capitol Grounds and in any of the Capitol Buildings; Parading ... in any of the Capitol Buildings; Failure to Appear (2 counts)	Chilcoat pleaded Not Guilty to all charges.	Jury trial set for 5/5/2025. On 2/3/2025, the court grants the government's motion to dismiss the case with prejudice.	
August 11, 2022	Shawndale Chilcoat	Federal: Obstruction of an Official Proceeding and Aiding and Abetting; Entering ... in a Restricted Building or Grounds; Disorderly ... in a Restricted Building or Grounds; Entering ... on the Floor of Congress; Disorderly Conduct on Capitol Grounds and in any of the Capitol Buildings; Parading ... in any of the Capitol Buildings; Failure to Appear	Chilcoat pleaded Not Guilty to all charges.	Jury trial set for 5/5/2025. On 2/3/2025, the court grants the government's motion to dismiss the case with prejudice.	
April 29, 2024	John Barry Chisholm	Federal: Knowingly Entering or Remaining in any Restricted Building or Grounds Without Lawful Authority; Disorderly ... in a Restricted Building or Grounds; Disorderly Conduct in a Capitol Building or Grounds; Parading ... in a Capitol Building		On 1/22/2025, the court grants the government's motion to dismiss the case with prejudice	
November 03, 2022	Raymund Joseph Cholod	Federal: Assaulting ... Certain Officers	Cholod pleaded Guilty to the single charge.	Sentenced on 7/2/2024 to 40 Months of incarceration; 36 Months of supervised release; $100 special assessment; $2,000 restitution.	Cholod received a full pardon on January 20, 2025
February 11, 2021	William Chrestman	Federal: Conspiracy; Obstruction of an Official Proceeding and Aiding and Abetting; Obstruction of Law Enforcement During Civil Disorder and Aiding and Abetting; Threatening a Federal Officer; Entering ... in a Restricted Building or Grounds and Carrying a Deadly or Dangerous Weapon, that is, a wooden axe handle	Chrestman pleaded Guilty to two charges: Obstruction of an Official Proceeding and Threatening a Federal Officer. The other charges are dismissed.	Sentenced on 1/12/2024 to 55 months of Incarceration; 36 months of Supervised Release; $200 Special Assessment; restitution of $2,000.	Chrestman received a full pardon on January 20, 2025
December 07, 2022	Holly D. Christensen	Federal: Entering ... in a Restricted Building or Grounds; Disorderly ... in a Restricted Building or Grounds; Disorderly Conduct in a Capitol Building; Parading ... in a Capitol Building	Christensen pleaded Guilty to one charge: Parading ... in a Capitol Building. The other charges are dismissed.	Sentenced on 12/18/2023 to 36 months of probation; 30 days of home confinement; restitution of $500; $10 special assessment; 60 hours of community service.	Christensen received a full pardon on January 20, 2025
April 25, 2021	Reed Knox Christensen	Federal: Civil Disorder; Assaulting ... Certain Officers (3 counts); Entering ... in a Restricted Building or Grounds; Disorderly ... in a Restricted Building or Grounds; Engaging in Physical Violence in a Restricted Building or Grounds; Act of Physical Violence in the Capitol Grounds or Buildings	Christensen pleaded Not Guilty to all charges. Found Guilty on all charges in a Jury trial on 9/18/2023.	Sentenced on 1/12/2024 to 46 months incarceration; 36 months supervised release; fine of $20,000; restitution of $2,000; special assessment of $260.	Christensen received a full pardon on January 20, 2025
December 07, 2022	Scott Ray Christensen	Federal: Entering ... in a Restricted Building or Grounds; Disorderly ... in a Restricted Building or Grounds; Disorderly Conduct in a Capitol Building; Parading ... in a Capitol Building	Christensen pleaded Guilty to one charge: Parading ... in a Capitol Building. The other charges are dismissed.	Sentenced on 12/18/2023 to 36 months of probation; 30 days home confinement; restitution of $500; $10 special assessment; 60 hours of community service.	Christensen received a full pardon on January 20, 2025
December 23, 2022	Eric Christie	Federal: Entering ... in a Restricted Building or Grounds with a Deadly Weapon; Disorderly or Disruptive Conduct in Restricted Building or Grounds with a Deadly Weapon	Christie pleaded Not Guilty to all charges. Found Guilty in a Bench trial on 8/11/2023 of both charges.	Sentenced on 12/1/2023 to time served; 36 months of supervised release; 100 hours of community service; $200 special assessment.	Christie received a full pardon on January 20, 2025
July 28, 2021	Daniel Christmann	Federal: Entering ... in a Restricted Building or Grounds; Disorderly ... in a Restricted Building or Grounds; Disorderly Conduct in a Capitol Building; Parading ... in a Capitol Building	Christmann pleaded Guilty to one charge: Parading ... in a Capitol Building. The other charges are dismissed.	Sentenced on 2/15/2024 to 25 Days incarceration; Special Assessment of $10; $500 restitution.	Christmann received a full pardon on January 20, 2025
December 19, 2022	Agnieszka Chwiesiuk	Federal: Entering ... in a Restricted Building or Grounds; Disorderly ... in a Restricted Building or Grounds; Disorderly Conduct in a Capitol Building; Parading ... in a Capitol Building	Chwiesiuk pleaded Not Guilty to all charges. Found Guilty in a jury trial on 8/11/2023 on all charges.	Sentenced on 1/24/2024 to 3 years probation; 90 days location monitoring/home detention; $70 special assessment; $500 restitution; 200 hours of community service.	Chwiesiuk received a full pardon on January 20, 2025
June 11, 2021	Karol J. Chwiesiuk	Federal: Entering ... in a Restricted Building; Disorderly ... in a Restricted Building; Entering ... in a Room Designated for the Use of a Member of Congress; Violent Entry and Disorderly Conduct in a Capitol Building; Parading ... in a Capitol Building	Chwiesiuk pleaded Not Guilty to all charges. A jury trial on 8/11/2023 found him Guilty on four charges, Not Guilty on one charge: Entering ... in a Room Designated for the Use of a Member of Congress.	Sentenced on 1/24/2024 to 3 Years probation, to include 90 Days of home detention and location monitoring; Special assessment of $70; Restitution of $500; 200 hours of community service.	Chwiesiuk received a full pardon on January 20, 2025
August 01, 2023	Louis Michael Ciampi, Jr.	Federal: Parading ... in a Capitol Building	Ciampi pleaded Guilty to the charge.	Sentenced on 11/30/2023 to 18 months probation; $10 special assessment; $500 restitution; 60 days location monitoring; 60 hours of community service.	Ciampi received a full pardon on January 20, 2025
January 12, 2021	Albert A. Ciarpelli	Federal: Entering ... in a Restricted Building or Grounds	Ciarpelli pleaded Guilty to the single charge.	Sentenced on 5/6/2024 to 90 days incarceration; 12 months of Supervised Release; Special Assessment of $25; restitution of $500.	Ciarpelli received a full pardon on January 20, 2025
February 13, 2024	Cameron Clapp	Federal: Entering ... in a Restricted Building or Grounds; Disorderly ... in a Restricted Building or Grounds; Disorderly Conduct in a Capitol Building; Parading ... in a Capitol Building.	Clapp pleaded Guilty to two charges: Disorderly Conduct in a Capitol Building; Parading ... in a Capitol Building. The other charges are dismissed.	Sentenced on 10/29/2024 to 12 months of Probation; Special Assessment of $20; Restitution of $500; 100 hours of community service.	Clapp received a full pardon on January 20, 2025
June 21, 2023	Kevin S. Clardy	Federal: Disorderly ... in a Restricted Building or Grounds	Clardy pleaded Guilty to the charge.	Sentenced on 12/21/2023 to 60 days incarceration; 12 months of supervised release; special assessment of $25; Restitution of $500.	Clardy received a full pardon on January 20, 2025
February 10, 2021	Christy Clark	Federal: Entering ... in a Restricted Building; Disorderly ... in a Restricted Building; Violent Entry and Disorderly Conduct in a Capitol Building; Parading ... in a Capitol Building	Clark pleaded Guilty to one charge: Parading ... in a Capitol Building. The other charges are dismissed.	Sentenced on 10/28/2022 to 24 months probation; 60 hours community service; $500 restitution; $10 special assessment.	Clark received a full pardon on January 20, 2025
May 04, 2021	Eric Douglas Clark	Federal: Entering ... in a Restricted Building or Grounds; Disorderly ... in a Restricted Building or Grounds; Disorderly Conduct in a Capitol Building or Grounds; Parading ... in a Capitol Building	Clark pleaded Not Guilty to all charges. Found Guilty on all charges in a Jury trial on 1/31/2024.	Sentenced on 6/7/2024 to 5 months of incarceration; 12 months of Supervised Release; Special Assessment of $70; $500 restitution; 50 hours of community service.	Clark received a full pardon on January 20, 2025
April 21, 2021	Jacob Travis Clark	Federal: Civil Disorder; Assaulting ... Certain Officers Using a Dangerous Weapon; Assaulting ... Certain Officers Using a Dangerous Weapon, Inflicting Bodily Injury; Entering ... in a Restricted Building or Grounds with a Deadly or Dangerous Weapon; Disorderly ... in a Restricted Building or Grounds with a Deadly or Dangerous Weapon; Engaging in Physical Violence in a Restricted Building or Grounds with a Deadly or Dangerous Weapon; Entering ... in the Gallery of Congress; Disorderly Conduct in a Capitol Building; Act of Physical Violence in the Capitol Grounds or Buildings; Parading ... in a Capitol Building	Clark pleaded Not Guilty to all charges. Found Guilty on all charges in a Stipulated Bench trial held on 1/30/2023.	Sentenced on 10/27/2023 to 33 months incarceration; 12 months of supervised release; $180 special assessment. On 9/9/2024, the court orders that the conviction be vacated and the case be remanded for further proceedings. A new superseding indictment is filed 10/2/2024. On 1/21/2025, the court grants the government's motion to dismiss the case with prejudice.	
August 19, 2024	John Walter Clark IV	Federal: Civil Disorder; Assaulting ... Certain Officers; Entering ... in a Restricted Building or Grounds; Disorderly ... in a Restricted Building or Grounds; Engaging in Physical Violence in a Restricted Building or Grounds; Disorderly Conduct in a Capitol Building; Act of Physical Violence in the Capitol Grounds or Buildings	Clark pleaded Not Guilty to all charges.	On 1/21/2025, the court grants the government's motion to dismiss the case with prejudice.	
February 10, 2021	Matthew Clark	Federal: Entering ... in a Restricted Building; Disorderly ... in a Restricted Building; Violent Entry and Disorderly Conduct in a Capitol Building; Parading ... in a Capitol Building	Clark pleaded Guilty to one charge: Parading ... in a Capitol Building. The other charges are dismissed.	Sentenced 10/28/2022 to 24 months of probation; 60 hours community service; $500 restitution; $10 special assessment.	Clark received a full pardon on January 20, 2025
August 30, 2023	Nico Clary	Federal: Entering ... in a Restricted Building or Grounds	Clary pleaded Guilty to the charge.	Sentenced on 6/18/2024 to 3 Years Probation; Special Assessment of $25; Restitution of $500; Fine of $1,800; 200 hours of community service.	Clary received a full pardon on January 20, 2025
August 30, 2023	Xyan Clary	Federal: Entering ... in a Restricted Building or Grounds	Clary pleaded Guilty to the charge.	Sentenced on 6/18/2024 to 3 Years Probation; Special Assessment of $25; Restitution of $500; Fine of $1,800; 200 hours of community service.	Clary received a full pardon on January 20, 2025
March 31, 2022	Cale Douglas Clayton	Federal: Civil Disorder; Assaulting ... Certain Officers (2 counts); Theft of Property Within Special and Maritime Jurisdiction; Entering ... in a Restricted Building or Grounds; Disorderly ... in a Restricted Building or Grounds; Engaging in Physical Violence in a Restricted Building or Grounds; Act of Physical Violence in the Capitol Grounds or Buildings	Clayton pleaded Guilty to two charges: Two counts of Assaulting ... Certain Officers. The other charges are dismissed.	Sentenced on 7/11/2023 to 30 months incarceration; 24 months of supervised release; special assessment of $200; restitution of $2,000.	Clayton received a full pardon on January 20, 2025
October 03, 2024	James Roe Cleary	Federal: Civil Disorder; Entering ... in a Restricted Building or Grounds; Disorderly ... in a Restricted Building or Grounds; Engaging in Physical Violence in a Restricted Building or Grounds; Disorderly Conduct in a Capitol Building; Act of Physical Violence in the Capitol Grounds or Buildings	Cleary pleaded Not Guilty to all charges.	On 1/21/2025, the court grants the government's motion to dismiss the case with prejudice.	
May 20, 2022	Chadwick Gordon Clifton	Federal: Entering ... in a Restricted Building or Grounds; Disorderly ... in a Restricted Building or Grounds; Disorderly Conduct on Capitol Grounds; Parading ... in a Capitol Building	Clifton pleaded Guilty to one charge: Parading ... in a Capitol Building. The other charges are dismissed.	Sentenced on 1/13/2023 to 36 months Probation; 21 days intermittent confinement and 90 days home detention; special assessment of $10; a fine of $500; restitution of $500.	Clifton received a full pardon on January 20, 2025.
June 03, 2024	Ronald John Cloutier	Federal: Entering ... in a Restricted Building or Grounds; Disorderly ... in a Restricted Building or Grounds; Disorderly Conduct in a Capitol Building; Parading ... in a Capitol Building		On 1/22/2025, the court grants the government's motion to dismiss the case with prejudice.	
August 09, 2023	Benjamin Cohen	Federal: Civil Disorder; Assaulting ... Certain Officers; Civil Disorder; Entering ... in a Restricted Building or Grounds; Disorderly ... in a Restricted Building or Grounds; Engaging in Physical Violence in a Restricted Building or Grounds; Disorderly Conduct in a Capitol Building; Act of Physical Violence in the Capitol Grounds or Buildings	Cohen pleaded Guilty to one charge: Assaulting ... Certain Officers.	Sentencing reset for 1/14/2025. On 1/21/2025, the court grants the government's motion to dismiss the case with prejudice.	
November 21, 2022	Menachem Cohen	Federal: Entering ... in a Restricted Building or Grounds; Disorderly ... in a Restricted Building or Grounds; Disorderly Conduct in a Capitol Building; Parading ... in a Capitol Building	Cohen pleaded Guilty to one charge: Parading ... in a Capitol Building. The other charges are dismissed.	Sentenced on 6/12/2023 to 36 months of probation; $500 restitution; 60 hours of community service; $10 special assessment.	Cohen received a full pardon on January 20, 2025
February 25, 2021	Luke Russell Coffee	Federal: Civil Disorder; Assaulting ... Certain Officers Using a Dangerous Weapon; Entering ... Restricted Building or Grounds with a Deadly or Dangerous Weapon; Disorderly ... Restricted Building or Grounds with a Deadly or Dangerous Weapon; Impeding Ingress and Egress in a Restricted Building or Grounds with a Deadly or Dangerous Weapon; Engaging in Physical Violence in a Restricted Building or Grounds with a Deadly or Dangerous Weapon; Disorderly Conduct in a Capitol Building; Impeding Passage Through the Capitol Grounds or Buildings; Act of Physical Violence in the Capitol Grounds or Buildings	Not Guilty – all charges		Actor, resident of Dallas, accused of assaulting police officers with a crutch. He was hiding out for six weeks at a luxury resort in the Texas Hill Country, whose owner was sympathetic to the rioters and described them on social media as being victims of a media smear campaign.
January 6, 2021	Lonnie Leroy Coffman	Federal: Possession of an Unregistered Firearm [11 Molotov cocktails]; Carrying a Pistol Without a License (outside home or place of business) [9mm Smith & Wesson handgun, .22 caliber North American arms revolver, 9mm Hi-Point handgun]; Carrying a Rifle or Shotgun (Outside Home or Place of Business) [Windham Weaponry rifle, Hatfield Gun Company SAS shotgun]; Possession of a Large Capacity Ammunition Feeding Device; Unlawful Possession of Ammunition [.22 caliber rounds, 9mm rounds, 5.56 x 45mm rounds, .223 caliber rounds, shotgun shells]	Not Guilty – all charges	In April 2022, he was sentenced to 46 months in prison followed by three years of supervised release.	70-year-old resident of Falkville, Alabama. He allegedly parked a pickup truck two blocks from the Capitol containing eleven homemade incendiary devices (described as "Mason jars filled with homemade napalm" intended to "stick to the target and continue to burn" in court filings), an AR-15 style rifle, a shotgun, two pistols, a crossbow, a stun gun, and camo smoke canisters. Court documents said that upon being stopped by police, the man "asked officers whether they had located the bombs", and prosecutors also "suggest[ed] an intent to provide [weapons] to others". Authorities also found handwritten notes listing "purported contact information" for Ted Cruz (R), Fox News host Sean Hannity, and radio host Mark Levin, as well as a list of "bad guys" including Seventh Circuit judge David Hamilton and Rep. André Carson (D–IN), who was referred to as "one of two Muslims in the House".
July 12, 2023	Joshua Curtis Coker	Federal: Entering ... in a Restricted Building or Grounds; Disorderly ... in a Restricted Building or Grounds; Entering ... in the Gallery of Congress; Disorderly Conduct in a Capitol Building; Parading ... in a Capitol Building	Coker pleaded Guilty to one charge: Disorderly ... in a Restricted Building or Grounds.	Sentenced on 5/24/2024 to 36 Months of Probation; home detention for 8 Months; Special Assessment of $25; Restitution in the amount of $500.	Coker received a full pardon on January 20, 2025
October 28, 2021	Paul Gray Colbath	Federal: Entering ... in a Restricted Building or Grounds; Disorderly ... in a Restricted Building or Grounds; Disorderly Conduct in a Capitol Building; Parading ... in a Capitol Building	Colbath pleaded Guilty to one charge: Parading ... in a Capitol Building. The other charges are dismissed.	Sentenced on 4/6/2022 to 36 Months of Probation; 30 days location monitoring/home detention; 60 hours of community service; $10 Special Assessment; Restitution of $500.	Colbath received a full pardon on January 20, 2025
August 24, 2022	Benjamin Cole	Federal: Civil Disorder	Cole pleaded Guilty to the single charge.	Sentenced on 10/3/2023 to 48 Months of Probation, including 3 Months of Location Monitoring; 40 hours of community service; Special Assessment of $100; Restitution of $2,000.	Cole received a full pardon on January 20, 2025
May 13, 2024	Antonio Colello	Federal: Disorderly Conduct in a Capitol Building; Parading ... in a Capitol Building	Colello pleaded Guilty to both charges.	Sentencing set for 1/30/2025. On 1/23/2025, the court grants the government's motion to dismiss the case with prejudice.	
January 31, 2024	Robert Colello	Federal: Disorderly Conduct in a Capitol Building or Grounds; Parading ... in a Capitol Building	Colello pleaded Guilty to two charges: Disorderly Conduct in a Capitol Building or Grounds; Parading ... in a Capitol Building. The other charges are dismissed.	Sentenced on 6/21/2024 to 12 months of probation; 50 hours of community service; $500 restitution; $20 special assessment. Colello received a full pardon on January 20, 2025	
May 02, 2022	Joshua Colgan	Federal: Entering ... in a Restricted Building or Grounds; Disorderly ... in a Restricted Building or Grounds; Disorderly Conduct in a Capitol Building; Parading ... in a Capitol Building	Colgan pleaded Guilty to one charge: Parading ... in a Capitol Building. The other charges are dismissed.	Sentenced on 4/25/2023 to Count 36 months of probation; 28 days of intermittent confinement; 90 days of home detention; $500 restitution; $10 special assessment.	Colgan received a full pardon on January 20, 2025
August 06, 2024	Daniel Collins	Federal: Civil Disorder; Assaulting ... Certain Officers; Entering ... in a Restricted Building or Grounds; Disorderly ... in a Restricted Building or Grounds; Engaging in Physical Violence in a Restricted Building or Grounds; Entering ... in Certain Rooms in the Capitol Building; Disorderly Conduct in a Capitol Building; Act of Physical Violence in the Capitol Grounds or Buildings; Parading, Picketing, and Demonstrating in a Capitol Building	Collins pleaded Not Guilty to all charges.	On 1/21/2025, the court grants the government's motion to dismiss the case with prejudice	
February 11, 2021	Louis Enrique Colon	Federal: Conspiracy; Obstruction of an Official Proceeding and Aiding and Abetting; Civil Disorder; Entering ... in a Restricted Building or Grounds	Colon pleaded Guilty to one charge: Civil Disorder. The other charges are dismissed.	Sentenced on 7/9/2024 to 24 months probation (with conditions); $100 Special Assessment; Restitution of $2,000.	Colon received a full pardon on January 20, 2025
January 12, 2021	Josiah Colt	Federal: Obstruction of an Official Proceeding; Aiding and Abetting; Entering ... Restricted Building; Disorderly ... Restricted Building; Violent Entry and Disorderly Conduct in a Capitol Building	Guilty – one charge: Obstruction of an Official Proceeding. The other charges are dismissed. (July 14, 2021)	He has agreed to cooperate with authorities. Sentenced to 15 months in prison, 36 months of supervised release, and ordered to pay $1,000	34-year-old man from Boise, Idaho, photographed hanging from the Senate balcony during the rampage, was listed as a person of interest by the Metropolitan Police Department of the District of Columbia; he deleted his social media accounts following the riots, and issued an apology.
December 15, 2023	Kyle Travis Colton	Federal: Disorderly ... in a Restricted Building or Grounds	Colton pleaded Guilty to the single charge.	Sentencing reset for 1/22/2025. On 1/21/2025, the court grants the government's motion to dismiss the case with prejudice	On July 16, 2025, Colton was convicted in an unrelated child pornography case. He was sentenced to six years and eight months imprisonment in the case.
June 05, 2023	Scott Columbus	Federal: Entering or Remaining in a Restricted Building or Grounds; Disorderly or Disruptive Conduct in a Restricted Building or Grounds; Disorderly Conduct in a Capitol Building; Parading ... in a Capitol Building	Columbus pleaded Guilty to one charge: Parading ... in a Capitol Building. The other charges are dismissed.	Sentenced on 1/31/2024 to 30 months Probation; $500 Restitution; $10 special assessment.	Columbus received a full pardon on January 20, 2025
October 14, 2021	Jason Michael Comeau	Federal: Entering ... in a Restricted Building or Grounds; Disorderly ... in a Restricted Building or Grounds; Disorderly Conduct in a Capitol Building; Parading ... in a Capitol Building	Comeau pleaded Guilty to one charge: Parading ... in a Capitol Building. The other charges are dismissed.	Sentenced 11/15/2022 to 12 months of Probation; 60 days location monitoring; $10 Special Assessment; Fine of $371; Restitution of $500; 60 hours of community service.	Comeau received a full pardon on January 20, 2025
October 15, 2024	Teresa Conemac	Federal: Disorderly Conduct in a Capitol Building; Parading ... in a Capitol Building	Conemac pleaded Guilty to both charges.	Sentencing set for 2/7/2025. On 1/22/2025, the court ordered that the case is dismissed without prejudice	
May 17, 2022	Paula Ann Conlon	Federal: Entering ... in a Restricted Building or Grounds; Disorderly ... in a Restricted Building or Grounds; Disorderly Conduct in a Capitol Building or Grounds; Parading ... in a Capitol Building	Conlon pleaded Guilty to one charge: Parading ... in a Capitol Building. The other charges are dismissed.	Sentenced on 1/5/2023 to 12 Months Probation; Special Assessment of $10; Restitution of $500.	Conlon received a full pardon on January 20, 2025
January 16, 2021	Cody Page Carter Connell	Federal: Civil Disorder; Obstruction of an Official Proceeding and Aiding and Abetting; Assaulting ... Certain Officers; Entering ... in a Restricted Building or Grounds; Disorderly ... in a Restricted Building or Grounds; Disorderly Conduct in a Capitol Building; Parading ... in a Capitol Building	Connell pleaded Not Guilty to all charges. Found Guilty in a Stipulated Bench trial on all charges on 7/28/2023. The court dismissed. the Obstruction conviction.	Sentenced on 12/10/2024 to 26 Months of Incarceration; 36 months of supervised release; Special Assessment: $270; Fine (in lieu of restitution): $2,000.	Connell received a full pardon on January 20, 2025
January 20, 2023	Kim Marie Connolly	Federal: Entering ... in a Restricted Building or Grounds; Disorderly and Disrnptive Conduct in a Restricted Building or Grounds; Disorderly Conduct in a Capitol Building or Grounds; Parading ... in a Capitol Building	Connolly pleaded Guilty to one charge: Parading ... in a Capitol Building. The other charges are dismissed.	Sentenced on 12/19/2023 to 6 months of probation; special assessment of $10; Restitution of $500.	Connolly received a full pardon on January 20, 2025
August 31, 2021	Francis Connor	Federal: Entering ... in a Restricted Building; Disorderly ... in a Restricted Building; Disorderly Conduct in a Capitol Building; Parading ... in a Capitol Building	Connor pleaded Guilty to one charge: Parading ... in a Capitol Building. The other charges are dismissed.	Sentenced on 9/15/2022 to 12 months Probation with 3 of the twelve months to be served in Home Confinement; a Special Assessment of $10; Restitution of $500; a $371 Fine; 60 hours of community service.	Connor received a full pardon on January 20, 2025
December 08, 2021	Thomas Paul Conover	Federal: Entering ... in a Restricted Building or Grounds; Disorderly ... in a Restricted Building or Grounds; Disorderly Conduct in a Capitol Building; Parading ... in a Capitol Building	Conover pleaded Guilty to one charge: Parading ... in a Capitol Building. The other charges are dismissed.	Sentenced on 4/22/2022 to 36 months probation with 30 days confinement in a residential re-entry facility; $2500 fine; $500 restitution; $10 special assessment.	Conover received a full pardon on January 20, 2025
March 09, 2023	Richard Cook	Federal: Civil Disorder; Entering ... in a Restricted Building or Grounds; Disorderly ... in a Restricted Building or Grounds; Engaging in Physical Violence in a Restricted Building or Grounds; Impeding Passage through the Capitol Grounds or Buildings; Act of Physical Violence in the Capitol Grounds or Buildings	Cook pleaded Not Guilty to all charges. Found Guilty in a Jury trial on 5/10/2024 on all charges.	Sentenced on 8/28/2024 to 18 months incarceration with credit for time served; 36 months of supervised release; $2,000 in restitution; special assessment of $195.	Cook received a full pardon on January 20, 2025
September 16, 2023	Steven Cook	Federal: Civil Disorder; Assaulting ... Certain Officers (2 counts); Entering ... in a Restricted Building or Grounds; Disorderly ... in a Restricted Building or Grounds; Engaging in Physical Violence in a Restricted Building or Grounds; Act of Physical Violence in the Capitol Grounds or Buildings	Cook pleaded Guilty to two counts of Assaulting ... Certain Officers. The other charges are dismissed.	Sentenced on 7/19/2024 to 28 Months of Incarceration; 36 Months of Supervised Release; Special Assessment of $200; Restitution of $2,000.	Cook received a full pardon on January 20, 2025
January 21, 2021	Nolan Bernard Cooke	Federal: Civil Disorder	Cooke pleaded Guilty to the single charge: Civil Disorder.	Sentenced 6/10/2022 to 12 months and 1 day incarceration; 3 years supervised release; $2,000 in restitution; $100 special assessment.	Cooke received a full pardon on January 20, 2025
January 18, 2023	Micah Coomer	Federal: Parading ... in a Capitol Building.	Coomer pleaded Guilty to the charge.	Sentenced on 9/12/2023 to 4 years probation; 279 hours of community service; Special assessment of $10; Restitution of $500.	Coomer received a full pardon on January 20, 2025
August 25, 2022	Jonathan Joseph Copeland	Federal: Civil Disorder (2 counts); Assaulting ... Certain Officers Using a Dangerous Weapon; Entering ... in a Restricted Building or Grounds with a Deadly or Dangerous Weapon; Disorderly ... in a Restricted Building or Grounds; Engaging in Physical Violence in a Restricted Building or Grounds; Disorderly Conduct in a Capitol Building; Act of Physical Violence in the Capitol Grounds or Buildings; Parading ... in a Capitol Building	Copeland pleaded Not Guilty to all charges. Found Guilty on all charges but one (Disorderly Conduct in a Capitol Building) in a Bench trial on 5/8/2024.	Sentenced on 12/2/2024 to 71 months of incarceration; 3 years of supervised release; $2,000 restitution; $620 special assessment.	Copeland received a full pardon on January 20, 2025
April 29, 2021	Landon Kenneth Copeland	Federal: Civil Disorder; Obstruction of an Official Proceeding; Assaulting ... Certain Officers; Assaulting ... Certain Officers Using a Dangerous Weapon; Inflicting Bodily Injury on Certain Officers; Entering ... in a Restricted Building or Grounds; Disorderly ... in a Restricted Building or Grounds; Engaging in Physical Violence in a Restricted Building or Grounds; Disorderly Conduct in a Capitol Building or Grounds; Act of Physical Violence in the Capitol Grounds or Buildings	Copeland pleaded Guilty to one charge: Assaulting ... Law Enforcement Officers. The other charges are dismissed.	Sentenced on 5/8/2023 to 36 months of incarceration; 36 months supervised release, with first six months served on home detention; $100 special assessment; $2,000 restitution.	Copeland received a full pardon on January 20, 2025
February 20, 2024	Robert Coppotelli	Federal: Entering ... in a Restricted Building or Grounds; Disorderly ... in a Restricted Building or Grounds; Disorderly Conduct in a Capitol Building or Grounds; Parading ... in a Capitol Building	Coppotelli pleaded Guilty to two charges: Disorderly Conduct in a Capitol Building or Grounds; Parading ... in a Capitol Building. The other charges are dismissed.	Sentenced on 12/6/2024 to 9 months of Probation; $20 Special Assessment; Restitution of $500.	Coppotelli received a full pardon on January 20, 2025
March 9, 2021	Kevin Francisco Cordon	Federal: Obstruction of an Official Proceeding; Entering ... Restricted Building or Grounds; Disorderly ... Restricted Building or Grounds; Disorderly Conduct in a Capitol Building; Parading ... in a Capitol Building	Guilty – one charge: Entering ... Restricted Building or Grounds. The other charges were dismissed.	Sentenced to 12 months' probation, 100 hours of community service, $4,000 fine, $500 restitution	
March 9, 2021	Sean Carlo Cordon	Federal: Entering ... Restricted Building or Grounds; Disorderly ... Restricted Building or Grounds; Disorderly Conduct in a Capitol Building; Parading ... in a Capitol Building	Guilty – one charge: Parading ... in a Capitol Building. The other charges were dismissed.	Sentenced to one month probation and a $4,000 fine	
April 18, 2024	Dylan Cornell	Federal: Knowingly Entering or Remaining in any Restricted Building or Grounds Without Lawful Authority; Disorderly ... in a Restricted Building or Grounds; Disorderly Conduct in a Capitol Building or Grounds; Parading ... in a Capitol Building		On 2/19/2025, the court grants the government's motion to dismiss the case with prejudice.	
March 26, 2021	Christian Glen Cortez	Federal: Civil Disorder	Cortez pleaded Guilty to Civil Disorder.	Sentenced 8/31/2022 to 4 months incarceration; 36 months of supervised release; 60 hours of community service; $2,000 restitution; $100 special assessment.	Cortez received a full pardon on January 20, 2025
February 12, 2021	Elias Costianes	Federal: Obstruction of an Official Proceeding; Entering ... in a Restricted Building or Grounds; Disorderly ... in a Restricted Building or Grounds; Entering ... in the Gallery of Congress; Disorderly Conduct in a Capitol Building; Parading ... in a Capitol Building	Costianes pleaded Not Guilty to all charges.	On 1/21/2025, the court grants the government's motion to dismiss the case with prejudice	
December 07, 2022	William B. Cotton	Federal: Entering ... in a Restricted Building or Grounds; Disorderly ... in a Restricted Building or Grounds; Disorderly Conduct in a Capitol Building; Parading ... in a Capitol Building	Cotton pleaded Guilty to one charge: Parading ... in a Capitol Building. The other charges are dismissed.	Sentenced on 9/29/2023 to 9 months Probation; $10 Special Assessment; Restitution of $500; 60 hours of community service.	Cotton received a full pardon on January 20, 2025
January 14, 2021	Matthew Ross Council	Federal: Civil Disorder; Assaulting ... Certain Officers; Entering ... in a Restricted Building or Grounds; Disorderly ... in a Restricted Building or Grounds; Disorderly Conduct in a Capitol Building; Parading ... in a Capitol Building	Council pleaded Guilty to all six charges.	Sentenced on 12/12/2022 to 60 Months Probation; including 180 days of Home Incarceration with Location Monitoring; Special assessment of $270; Restitution of $2,000; 100 hours of community service.	Council received a full pardon on January 20, 2025
December 14, 2021	Mason Joel Courson	Federal: Civil Disorder; Assaulting ... Certain Officers Using a Dangerous Weapon and Aiding and Abetting; Assaulting ... Certain Officers; Entering ... in a Restricted Building or Grounds with a Deadly or Dangerous Weapon; Disorderly ... in a Restricted Building or Grounds with a Deadly or Dangerous Weapon; Engaging in Physical Violence in a Restricted Building or Grounds with a Deadly or Dangerous Weapon; Act of Physical Violence in the Capitol Grounds or Buildings	Courson pleaded Guilty to one charge: Assaulting ... Certain Officers Using a Dangerous Weapon and Aiding and Abetting. The other charges are dismissed.	Sentenced on 6/16/2023 to 57 months incarceration; 3 years supervised release; restitution of $2,000; Special assessment of $100.	Courson received a full pardon on January 20, 2025
January 19, 2021	Gracyn Dawn Courtright	Federal: Entering ... Restricted Building; Disorderly ... Restricted Building; Disorderly Conduct in a Capitol Building or Grounds; Parading ... in a Capitol Building; Theft of Government Property (less than $1,000) [a sign]	Guilty – one charge: Entering ... Restricted Building or Grounds. The other charges were dismissed.	Sentenced to one month in prison, supervised release for one-year, 60 hours of community service, and $500 in restitution	A college student at the time of the attack, Courtright was suspended from University of Kentucky following her arrest. After completion of her sentence, University of Kentucky allowed her to return and finish her degree, and she graduated with a degree in Economics in December 2023. Courtright received a full pardon on January 20, 2025.
July 08, 2022	Country Cramer	Federal: Entering ... in a Restricted Building or Grounds; Disorderly ... in a Restricted Building or Grounds; Disorderly Conduct in a Capitol Building; Parading ... in a Capitol Building	Cramer pleaded Guilty to one charge: Parading ... in a Capitol Building. The other charges are dismissed.	Sentenced on 2/23/2023 to 4 years Probation; 45 days location monitoring; $500 Restitution; $10 Special Assessment; 30 hours of community service. Cramer received a full pardon on January 20, 2025	
July 08, 2022	Eric Cramer	Federal: Entering ... in a Restricted Building or Grounds; Disorderly ... in a Restricted Building or Grounds; Disorderly Conduct in a Capitol Building; Parading ... in a Capitol Building	Cramer pleaded Guilty to one charge: Disorderly ... in a Restricted Building or Grounds. The other charges are dismissed.	Sentenced on 2/23/2023 to 8 Months Imprisonment; 12 Months Supervised Release; $500 Restitution and $25 Special Assessment.	Cramer received a full pardon on January 20, 2025
July 31, 2023	Esvetlana Cramer	Federal: Disorderly ... in a Capitol Building or Grounds; Parading ... in a Capitol Building	Cramer pleaded Guilty to both charges.	Sentenced on 5/15/2024 to 2 years of probation; $20 special assessment; $500 restitution; 60 hours of community service.	Cramer received a full pardon on January 20, 2025
February 01, 2021	Dalton Ray Crase	Federal: Entering ... Restricted Building or Grounds; Disorderly ... Restricted Building or Grounds; Disorderly Conduct in a Capitol Building or Grounds; Parading ... in a Capitol Building	Guilty – one charge: Parading ... in a Capitol Building. The other charges are dismissed.	Sentenced to three years of probation, 15 days of confinement, 60 hours of community service and $500 in restitution	Crase received a full pardon on January 20, 2025
July 12, 2023	Phillip Marion Crawford	Federal: Civil Disorder; Assaulting ... Certain Officers (4 counts); Assaulting, Resisting, Or Impeding Certain Officers using a Dangerous Weapon; Entering or Remaining in a Restricted Building or Grounds with a Deadly or Dangerous Weapon; Disorderly ... in a Restricted Building or Grounds with a Deadly or Dangerous Weapon; Engaging in Physical Violence in a Restricted Building or Grounds with a Deadly or Dangerous Weapon; Disorderly Conduct in a Capitol Building; Act of Physical Violence in the Capitol Grounds or Buildings	Crawford pleaded Guilty to six charges: Civil Disorder; Assaulting ... Certain Officers (4 counts); Act of Physical Violence in the Capitol Grounds or Buildings. Bench Trial on remaining five charges held 6/18/2024. Found Guilty on lesser charge of counts 7-10: Entering ... in a Restricted Building or Grounds; Disorderly ... in a Restricted Building or Grounds; Engaging in Physical Violence in a Restricted Building or Grounds; Disorderly Conduct in a Capitol Building. The Court declared it will find Crawford guilty of the lesser charge of Count 6 at the sentencing hearing reset for 2/7/2025.	On 1/23/2025, the court grants the government's motion to dismiss the case with prejudice.	
June 09, 2021	Kevin Douglas Creek	Federal: Assaulting ... Certain Officers	Creek pleaded Guilty to the single charge.	Sentenced 5/2/2022 to 27 months of incarceration, 12 months of supervised release, $100 special assessment and $2,000 restitution.	Creek received a full pardon on January 20, 2025
June 13, 2022	Dylan R. Cronin	Federal: Entering ... in a Restricted Building or Grounds; Disorderly ... in a Restricted Building or Grounds; Engaging in Physical Violence in a Restricted Building or Grounds; Disorderly Conduct in a Capitol Building; Engaging in Physical Violence in a Capitol Building; Parading ... in a Capitol Building; Damaging Property of the United States	Cronin pleaded Guilty to two charges: Entering ... in a Restricted Building or Grounds; and Damaging Property of the United States. The other charges are dismissed.	Sentenced on 9/8/2023 to eight months incarceration; 12 months Supervised Release; Restitution of $500; Special Assessments of $50; 200 hours of community service.	Cronin received a full pardon on January 20, 2025
June 13, 2022	Kevin M. Cronin Jr.	Federal: Entering ... in a Restricted Building or Grounds; Disorderly ... in a Restricted Building or Grounds; Disorderly Conduct in a Capitol Building; Parading ... in a Capitol Building	Cronin pleaded Guilty to one charge: Parading ... in a Capitol Building. The other charges are dismissed.	Sentenced on 6/9/2023 to 30 days incarceration; Special Assessment of $10; Restitution of $500.	Cronin received a full pardon on January 20, 2025
June 13, 2022	Kevin Cronin Sr.	Federal: Entering ... in a Restricted Building or Grounds; Disorderly ... in a Restricted Building or Grounds; Disorderly Conduct in a Capitol Building; Parading ... in a Capitol Building	Cronin pleaded Guilty to one charge: Parading ... in a Capitol Building. The other charges are dismissed.	Sentenced on 4/12/2023 to 18 months probation; 100 hours of community service; Special Assessment of $10; Fine of $1,500; Restitution of $500.	Cronin received a full pardon on January 20, 2025
December 16, 2024	David Caleb Crosby	Federal: Assault on a Federal Officer; Civil Disorder; Entering ... in a Restricted Building or Grounds; Disorderly or Disruptive Conduct in a Restricted Building or Grounds; Engaging in Physical Violence in a Restricted Building or Grounds; Disorderly Conduct in a Capitol Building or Grounds; Engage in an Act of Physical Violence in the Grounds or any of the Capitol Buildings		On 1/22/2025, the court grants the government's motion to dismiss the case with prejudice.	
June 03, 2021	Richard T. Crosby Jr.	Federal: Obstruction of an Official Proceeding; Entering ... in a Restricted Building or Grounds; Disorderly ... in a Restricted Building or Grounds; Entering ... on the Floor of Congress; Disorderly Conduct in a Capitol Building; Parading ... in a Capitol Building	Crosby pleaded Guilty to four charges: Entering ... in a Restricted Building or Grounds; Disorderly ... in a Restricted Building or Grounds; Disorderly Conduct in a Capitol Building; Parading ... in a Capitol Building.	Sentencing set for 2/6/2025. On 1/21/2025, the court grants the government's motion to dismiss the case with prejudice.	
January 19, 2021	Donovan Ray Crowl	Federal: Conspiracy; Obstruction of an Official Proceeding and Aiding and Abetting; Destruction of Government Property and Aiding and Abetting; Entering ... Restricted Building or Grounds; Civil Disorder and Aiding and Abetting	Not Guilty – all charges	Convicted of conspiracy and civil disorder	Member of Oath Keepers. One of the three who were indicted for conspiracy for planning their activities, alongside Jessica Watkins and Thomas Edward Caldwell.
August 24, 2022	John Edward Crowley	Federal: Civil Disorder; Theft of Government Property and Aiding and Abetting; Entering ... in a Restricted Building or Grounds; Disorderly ... in a Restricted Building or Grounds; Engaging in Physical Violence in a Restricted Building or Grounds; Impeding Passage Through the Capitol Grounds or Buildings	Crowley pleaded Not Guilty to all charges. In a Bench trial on 10/18/2023, found Guilty on four counts; and Not Guilty on two counts: Theft and Engaging in Physical Violence.	Sentenced on 2/23/2024 to 8 Months of Incarceration; 36 Months of Supervised Release; 6 Months of Home Incarceration; Special Assessment of $160; Fine in the amount of $7,000.	Crowley received a full pardon on January 20, 2025
February 17, 2021	Glenn Wes Lee Croy	Federal: Entering ... in a Restricted Building; Disorderly ... in a Restricted Building; Violent Entry and Disorderly Conduct in a Capitol Building; Parading ... in a Capitol Building	Croy pleaded Guilty to one charge: Parading ... in a Capitol Building. The other charges were dismissed.	Sentenced 11/5/2021 to 36 months probation with special conditions that include 14 days in a residential reentry center and 90 days location monitoring (home detention); $10.00 special assessment; and $500 in restitution.	Croy received a full pardon on January 20, 2025
February 28, 2022	Lloyd Casimiro Cruz Jr.	Federal: Entering ... in a Restricted Building or Grounds; Parading ... in a Capitol Building	Cruz pleaded Not Guilty to all charges. On 1/13/2023, he was found Guilty on both counts in a stipulated Bench trial.	Sentenced on 5/2/2023 to 45 days of incarceration; 1 year of Supervised Release; Special Assessment of $35; Restitution of $500.	Cruz received a full pardon on January 20, 2025
February 06, 2021	Bruno Joseph Cua	Federal: Civil Disorder; Obstruction of an Official Proceeding; Assaulting ... Certain Officers; Entering ... in a Restricted Building or Grounds with a Deadly or Dangerous Weapon; Disorderly ... in a Restricted Building or Grounds with a Deadly or Dangerous Weapon; Engaging in Physical Violence in a Restricted Building or Grounds with a Deadly or Dangerous Weapon; Entering ... on the Floor of Congress; Entering ... in the Gallery of Congress; Entering ... in Certain Rooms in the Capitol Building; Disorderly Conduct in a Capitol Building; Act of Physical Violence in the Capitol Grounds or Buildings; Parading ... in a Capitol Building	Cua pleaded Not Guilty to all charges. Stipulated Bench Trial held on 2/13/2023. Court finds Cua Guilty on two charges: Obstruction of an Official Proceeding; and Assaulting ... Certain Officers. The other charges are dismissed.	Sentenced on 7/26/2023 to 12 months and a day of incarceration; 36 months of supervised release; special assessment of $200; restitution of $2,000.	Cua received a full pardon on January 20, 2025
January 13, 2021	Jenny Louise Cudd	Federal: Obstruction of an Official Proceeding; Entering ... in a Restricted Building or Grounds; Disorderly ... in a Restricted Building or Grounds; Disorderly Conduct in a Capitol Building; Parading ... in a Capitol Building; Aiding and Abetting	Cudd pleaded Guilty to one charge: Entering ... in a Restricted Building or Grounds. The other charges were dismissed.	Sentenced on 3/23/2022 to 2 Months Probation; $25 Special Assessment; $5,000 Fine; Restitution of $500.	Cudd received a full pardon on January 20, 2025
December 18, 2023	Martin James Cudo	Federal: Obstruction of an Official Proceeding; Entering ... in a Restricted Building or Grounds; Disorderly ... in a Restricted Building or Grounds; Disorderly Conduct in a Capitol Building; Parading ... in a Capitol Building	Cudo pleaded Not Guilty to all charges. Bench Trial set for 1/27/2025.	On 1/21/2025, the court grants the government's motion to dismiss the case with prejudice	
October 24, 2022	Alan Scott Culbertson	Federal: Parading ... in a Capitol Building	Culbertson pleaded Guilty to the charge.	Sentenced on 11/2/2023 to 18 months of Probation; Special Assessment of $10; Restitution in the amount of $500; 50 hours of community service.	Culbertson received a full pardon on January 20, 2025
August 31, 2021	Christopher Michael Cunningham	Federal: Entering ... in a Restricted Building; Disorderly ... in a Restricted Building; Violent Entry and Disorderly Conduct in a Capitol Building; Parading ... in a Capitol Building	Cunningham pleaded Guilty to one charge: Parading ... in a Capitol Building. The other charges are dismissed.	Sentenced on 6/27/2022 to 12 months of Probation with 3 months on location monitoring/home detention; Special Assessment $10; Fine $1,113; Restitution of $500; 60 hours community service.	Cunningham received a full pardon on January 20, 2025
September 06, 2024	Kristen Oliver Cunningham	Federal: Entering or Remaining in a Restricted Building or Grounds; Disorderly or Disruptive Conduct in a Restricted Building or Grounds; Disorderly Conduct in a Capitol Building; Parading ... in a Capitol Building	Cunningham pleaded Guilty to two charges: Disorderly Conduct in a Capitol Building; Parading ... in a Capitol Building.	Sentencing set for 3/6/2025. On 1/24/2025, the court grants the government's motion to dismiss the case with prejudice.	
July 20, 2022	Jason Herold Curl	Federal: Entering ... in a Restricted Building or Grounds; Disorderly ... in a Restricted Building or Grounds; Disorderly Conduct in a Capitol Building or Grounds; Parading ... in a Capitol Building	Curl pleaded Guilty to two charges: Disorderly ... in a Restricted Building and Grounds; Parading ... in a Capitol Building. The other charges are dismissed.	Sentenced on 6/6/2024 to 24 months of probation; Special Assessment of $20; Fine of $1,000; Restitution of $500; 50 hours of community service.	Curl received a full pardon on January 20, 2025
January 14, 2021	Michael Curzio	Federal: Entering ... in a Restricted Building; Disorderly ... in a Restricted Building; Violent Entry and Disorderly Conduct in a Capitol Building; Parading ... in a Capitol Building	Curzio pleaded Guilty to one charge: Parading ... in a Capitol Building. The other charges were dismissed.	Sentenced 7/12/2021 to 6 months of incarceration; $500 restitution; and a $10 Special Assessment.	Curzio received a full pardon on January 20, 2025
June 24, 2021	Casey Cusick	Federal: Entering ... in a Restricted Building; Disorderly ... in a Restricted Building; Violent Entry and Disorderly Conduct in a Capitol Building; Parading ... in a Capitol Building	Cusick pleaded Not Guilty to all charges. Found Guilty on all charges in a Jury trial on 7/14/2023.	Sentenced on 10/12/2023 to 10 days of incarceration; 12 months of supervised release; 24 months of probation; Special assessment of $70; Fine of $3,000; Restitution of $500; 50 hours of community service.	Cusick received a full pardon on January 20, 2025
June 24, 2021	James Varnell Cusick Jr.	Federal: Entering ... in a Restricted Building; Disorderly ... in a Restricted Building; Violent Entry and Disorderly Conduct in a Capitol Building; Parading ... in a Capitol Building	Cusick pleaded Not Guilty to all charges. Found Guilty on all charges in a Jury trial on 7/14/2023.	Sentenced on 10/12/2023 to 10 days of incarceration; 12 months of supervised release; 24 months of probation; Special assessment of $70; Fine of $3,000; Restitution of $500; 50 hours of community service.	Cusick received a full pardon on January 20, 2025
January 10, 2024	Frank Dahlquist	Federal: Civil Disorder; Assaulting ... Certain Officers Using a Dangerous Weapon (2 counts); Entering ... in a Restricted Building or Grounds with a Deadly or Dangerous Weapon; Disorderly ... in a Restricted Building or Grounds; Engaging in Physical Violence in a Restricted Building or Grounds; Disorderly Conduct in a Capitol Building; Act of Physical Violence in the Capitol Grounds or Buildings; Parading ... in a Capitol Building	Dahlquist pleaded Not Guilty to all charges.	Jury trial set for 1/27/2025. On 1/22/2025, the court ordered that the case is dismissed without prejudice.	
March 27, 2024	Joshua Ryan Dale	Federal: Destruction of Government Property; Entering ... in a Restricted Building or Grounds; Disorderly ... in a Restricted Building or Grounds; Act of Physical Violence in a Restricted Building or Grounds; Disorderly or Disruptive Conduct in the Capitol Grounds or Building; Parading ... in a Capitol Building	Dale pleaded Guilty to one charge: Destruction of Government Property. The other charges are dismissed.	Sentenced on 12/19/2024 to 4 Months of Incarceration; 12 Months of Supervised Release; Special Assessment of $25; Restitution of $1,000.	Dale received a full pardon on January 20, 2025
September 20, 2024	David Daniel	Federal: assaulting police officers	Guilty	Not yet sentenced at time of clemency	After being granted clemency by President Donald Trump on January 20, 2025, Daniel is facing charges in North Carolina for child sexual assault and child pornography charges involving two young girls in his family, one prepubescent and one under the age of 12. The charges arose after police seized Daniel's devices in connection to a warrant for his January 6 charges.
February 23, 2023	Michael Daniele	Federal: Civil Disorder (2 counts); Entering ... in a Restricted Building or Grounds; Disorderly ... in a Restricted Building or Grounds; Disorderly Conduct in a Capitol Building; Parading ... in a Capitol Building	Daniele pleaded Not Guilty to all charges. Found Not Guilty on two charges of Civil Disorder in a Bench trial on 6/14/2024. Found Guilty on four charges: Entering ... in a Restricted Building or Grounds; Disorderly ... in a Restricted Building or Grounds; Disorderly Conduct in a Capitol Building; Parading ... in a Capitol Building.	Sentenced on 10/4/2024 to 24 months of probation, first 30 days on home detention; restitution of $500; $2,500 fine; $60 special assessment.	Daniele received a full pardon on January 20, 2025
July 14, 2021	Matthew DaSilva	Federal: Civil Disorder; Assaulting ... Certain Officers; Entering ... in any Restricted Building or Grounds; Disorderly ... in a Restricted Building or Grounds; Engaging in Physical Violence in a Restricted Building or Grounds; Disorderly Conduct in a Capitol Building; Act of Physical Violence in the Capitol Grounds or Buildings	DaSilva pleaded Not Guilty to all charges. Bench trial on 7/19/2023 found him Guilty on six charges and Not Guilty of one charge: Disorderly Conduct in a Capitol Building.	Sentenced on 4/23/2024 to 28 Months of Incarceration; 6 Months of Supervised Release; Special Assessment of $210. On 2/8/2024, the Court reconsiders its findings of guilt as to Counts Three, Four, and Five. And on those counts, the Court finds DaSilva not guilty.	DaSilva received a full pardon on January 20, 2025
January 15, 2021	Michael Shane Daughtry	Federal: Entering ... in a Restricted Building or Grounds; Disorderly ... in a Restricted Building or Grounds; Impeding Ingress and Egress in a Restricted Building or Grounds and Aiding and Abetting	Daughtry pleaded Guilty to one charge: Entering ... in a Restricted Building or Grounds. The other charges are dismissed.	Sentenced 6/9/2022 to 36 months probation, 60 days home detention w/monitoring; $500 restitution; $25 special assessment; 60 hours community service.	Daughtry received a full pardon on January 20, 2025
December 08, 2023	Curtis Davis	Federal: Assaulting ... Certain Officers	Davis pleaded Guilty to the charge.	Sentenced on 10/18/2024 to 24 months incarceration; 36 months of supervised release, the first six months of which to be served on home detention; $2,000 in restitution; $100 special assessment; 100 hours of community service.	Davis received a full pardon on January 20, 2025
June 09, 2023	David Allan Davis	Federal: Obstruction of an Official Proceeding; Entering ... in a Restricted Building or Grounds; Disorderly ... in a Restricted Building or Grounds; Disorderly Conduct in a Capitol Building or Grounds; Parading ... in a Capitol Building	Davis pleaded Not Guilty to all charges. Obstruction charge dismissed by the court on 9/19/2024. Bench Trial verdict on 1/10/2025 finds him Guilty on three charges; Entering ... in a Restricted Building or Grounds; Disorderly ... in a Restricted Building or Grounds; Parading ... in a Capitol Building. Not Guilty on one charge. Disorderly Conduct in a Capitol Building or Grounds.	Sentencing set for 5/7/2025. On 1/21/2025, the court grants the government's motion to dismiss the case with prejudice.	
October 17, 2023	Jacob Davis	Federal: Civil Disorder; Assaulting ... Certain Officers; Assaulting ... Certain Officers with Deadly or Dangerous Weapon; Assaulting ... Certain Officers; Entering ... in a Restricted Building or Grounds with a Deadly or Dangerous Weapon; Disorderly ... in a Restricted Building or Grounds with a Deadly or Dangerous Weapon; Engaging in Physical Violence in a Restricted Building or Grounds with a Deadly or Dangerous Weapon; Disorderly Conduct in a Capitol Building; Act of Physical Violence in the Capitol Grounds or Buildings	Davis pleaded Guilty to one charge: Assaulting ... Certain Officers with Deadly or Dangerous Weapon.	Sentencing set for 2/6/2025. On 1/23/2025, the court grants the government's motion to dismiss the case with prejudice	
July 28, 2021	James Russell Davis	Federal: Civil Disorder; Entering ... in a Restricted Building or Grounds; Disorderly ... in a Restricted Building or Grounds; Engaging in Physical Violence in a Restricted Building or Grounds; Disorderly Conduct in a Capitol Building; Act of Physical Violence in the Capitol Grounds or Buildings	Davis pleaded Guilty to one charge: Civil Disorder. The other charges are dismissed.	Sentenced on 10/31/2023 to 2 months of Incarceration; 24 months of Supervised Release (with conditions); $100 Special Assessment; Restitution in the amount of $2,000.	Davis received a full pardon on January 20, 2025
January 26, 2021	Nick DeCarlo	Federal: Conspiracy to Prevent an Officer from Discharging Any Duties; Assaulting ... Certain Officers (2 counts); Civil Disorder and Aiding and Abetting; Destruction of Government Property; Theft of Government Property; Entering ... in a Restricted Building or Grounds with a Deadly or Dangerous Weapon; Disorderly ... in a Restricted Building or Grounds with a Deadly or Dangerous Weapon; Act of Physical Violence in a Restricted building or Grounds with a Deadly or Dangerous Weapon	DeCarlo pleaded Guilty to one charge: Obstruction of an Official Proceeding. The other charges are dismissed.	Sentenced on 12/9/2022 to 48 months imprisonment; 36 months of supervised release; special assessment of $100; fine of $2,500; and restitution of $2,000. On Nov. 1, the court vacated the Obstruction charge. Second Superseding Indictment filed 1/15/2025. On 1/22/2025, the court ordered that the case is dismissed without prejudice.	
January 28, 2021	Nathaniel J. DeGrave	Federal: Conspiracy to Obstruct an Official Proceeding; Obstruction of an Official Proceeding; Assaulting ... Certain Officers; Civil Disorder; Entering ... in a Restricted Building or Grounds; Disorderly ... in a Restricted Building or Grounds	DeGrave pleaded Guilty to two charges: Conspiracy and Assaulting ... Certain Officers. The other charges are dismissed.	Sentenced on 5/10/2023 to 37 months of incarceration; 36 months of supervised release; $25,000 fine; restitution of $2,000; $200 special assessment.	DeGrave received a full pardon on January 20, 2025
January 25, 2023	Robert William DeGregoris	Federal: Civil Disorder; Entering ... in a Restricted Building or Grounds; Disorderly ... in a Restricted Building or Grounds; Impeding Passage Through the Capitol Grounds or Buildings	DeGregoris pleaded Not Guilty to all charges. Bench trial held 7/8-7/10/2024; Verdict on 10/4/2024 of Guilty on all charges.	Sentencing set for 2/7/2025. On 1/21/2025, the court grants the government's motion to dismiss the case with prejudice	
March 15, 2024	Isabella Maria DeLuca	Federal: Theft of Government Property and Aiding and Abetting; Entering ... in a Restricted Building or Grounds; Disorderly ... in a Restricted Building or Grounds; Disorderly Conduct in a Capitol Building; Parading ... in a Capitol Building	DeLuca pleaded Not Guilty to all charges.	Jury trial set for 5/12/2025. On 1/21/2025, the court grants the government's motion to dismiss the case with prejudice.	
February 21, 2024	Kim Eugene Decker II	Federal: Civil Disorder; Entering ... in a Restricted Building or Grounds; Disorderly ... in a Restricted Building or Grounds; Disorderly Conduct on Capitol Grounds; Parading ... in a Capitol Building	Decker pleaded Not Guilty to all charges.	On 1/22/2025, the court grants the government's motion to dismiss the case with prejudice.	
December 11, 2023	John A. Delbridge, Jr.	Federal: Entering ... in a Restricted Building or Grounds; Disorderly ... in a Restricted Building or Grounds; Disorderly Conduct in a Capitol Building; Parading ... in a Capitol Building	Delbridge pleaded Guilty to two charges: Disorderly Conduct in a Capitol Building; Parading ... in a Capitol Building.	Sentenced on 9/4/2024 to 24 Months of Probation; Restitution of $500; Special Assessment of $20; Fine of $500.	Delbridge received a full pardon on January 20, 2025
December 07, 2023	Johnny A. Delbridge III	Federal: Entering ... in a Restricted Building or Grounds; Disorderly ... in a Restricted Building or Grounds; Disorderly Conduct in a Capitol Building; Parading ... in a Capitol Building	Delbridge pleaded Guilty to two charges: Disorderly Conduct in a Capitol Building; Parading ... in a Capitol Building.	Sentenced on 9/4/2024 to 24 Months of Probation; Restitution of $500; Special Assessment of $20; Fine of $500.	Delbridge received a full pardon on January 20, 2025
May 11, 2024	Lincoln Adams Deming	Federal: Civil Disorder; Entering ... in a Restricted Building or Grounds; Disorderly ... in a Restricted Building or Grounds; Entering ... in the Gallery of Congress; Disorderly Conduct in a Capitol Building; Parading, Picketing, or Demonstrating in a Capitol Building; Civil Disorder	Deming pleaded Not Guilty to all charges.	On 1/21/2025, the court grants the government's motion to dismiss the case with prejudice	
August 2021	David Nicholas Dempsey	Federal: Civil Disorder; Obstruction of an Official Proceeding; Assaulting ... Certain Officers; Assaulting ... Certain Officers Using a Dangerous Weapon; Entering ... Restricted Building or Grounds with a Deadly or Dangerous Weapon; Disorderly ... Restricted Building or Grounds with a Deadly or Dangerous Weapon; Engaging in Physical Violence in a Restricted Building or Grounds with a Deadly or Dangerous Weapon; Disorderly Conduct in a Capitol Building or Grounds; Act of Physical Violence in the Capitol Grounds or Buildings	Pleaded guilty to two counts of assaulting police officers with a dangerous weapon	Sentenced to 20 years in prison	Dempsey stomped on police officers' heads, swung poles at officers, struck an officer in the head with a metal crutch and attacked police with pepper spray and broken pieces of furniture.
December 18, 2024	Daniel Dustin Deneui	Federal: Assaulting ... Certain Officers; Obstruction of Law Enforcement During Civil Disorder; Destruction of Government Property; Entering ... in a Restricted Building or Grounds with a Deadly or Dangerous Weapon; Disorderly ... in a Restricted Building or Grounds with a Deadly or Dangerous Weapon; Engaging in Physical Violence in a Restricted Building or Grounds; Disorderly Conduct in a Capitol Building; Act of Physical Violence in the Capitol Grounds or Buildings		On 1/21/2025, the court grants the government's motion to dismiss the case with prejudice.	
December 13, 2021	Lucas Denney	Federal: Assaulting ... Certain Officers Using a Dangerous Weapon	Denney pleaded Guilty to the single charge.	Sentenced on 9/28/2022 to 52 Months of Incarceration; 36 Months of Supervised Release; $100 Special Assessment.	Denney received a full pardon on January 20, 2025
October 20, 2021	Robert Wayne Dennis	Federal: Civil Disorder; Assaulting ... Certain Officers (3 counts); Entering ... in a Restricted Building or Grounds; Disorderly ... in a Restricted Building or Grounds; Engaging in Physical Violence in a Restricted Building or Grounds; Disorderly Conduct in a Capitol Building; Act of Physical Violence in the Capitol Grounds or Buildings	Dennis pleaded Not Guilty to all charges. Bench trial completed on 1/13/2023. Found Guilty on six charges: 1-2, 4-5, 7, and 9; Not Guilty on two charges: 6 and 8; and count 3 was dismissed.	Sentenced 4/13/2023 to 36 months incarceration; 24 months of Supervised Release; 60 hours of community service; $2,000 restitution; $360 special assessment.	Dennis received a full pardon on January 20, 2025
January 13, 2023	Victor Sean Dennison	Federal: Entering ... in a Restricted Building or Grounds; Disorderly ... in a Restricted Building or Grounds; Disorderly Conduct in a Capitol Building; Parading ... in a Capitol Building; Failure to Appear	Dennison pleaded Not Guilty to all charges. Found Guilty on all charges in a Bench trial on 8/28/2024.	Sentenced to 30 Days of Incarceration on the first four charges, and 150 Days of Incarceration on Count 5; 12 Months of Supervised Release; Special Assessment of $95.	Dennison received a full pardon on January 20, 2025
April 18, 2023	Timothy J. Desjardins	Federal: Civil Disorder; Assaulting ... Certain Officers Using a Dangerous Weapon; Entering ... in a Restricted Building or Grounds with a Deadly or Dangerous Weapon; Disorderly ... in a Restricted Building or Grounds with a Deadly or Dangerous Weapon; Engaging in Physical Violence in a Restricted Building or Grounds with a Deadly or Dangerous Weapon; Disorderly Conduct in a Capitol Building; Act of Physical Violence in the Capitol Grounds or Buildings	Desjardins was indicted by Grand Jury on 1/8/2025. Pleaded Not Guilty to all charges.	On 1/22/2025, the court grants the government's motion to dismiss the case with prejudice	
July 30, 2024	Catholine DeVries	Federal: Entering ... in a Restricted Building or Grounds; Disorderly ... in a Restricted Building or Grounds; Entering ... in Certain Rooms in the Capitol Building; Disorderly Conduct in a Capitol Building; Parading, Picketing, and Demonstrating in a Capitol Building		On 2/24/2025, the court grants the government's motion to dismiss the case with prejudice.	
June 02, 2022	Kimberly DiFrancesco	Federal: Parading ... in a Capitol Building	DiFrancesco pleaded guilty to Parading ... in a Capitol Building.	Sentenced 11/22/2022 to 30 months of probation, $2,000 fine, $500 restitution; $10 special assessment.	DeFrancesco received a full pardon on January 20, 2025
September 27, 2024	Adrienna DiCioccio	Federal: Entering ... in a Restricted Building or Grounds; Disorderly ... in a Restricted Building or Grounds; Disorderly Conduct in a Capitol Building; Parading ... in a Capitol Building	DiCioccio pleaded Not Guilty to all charges.	On 1/21/2025, the court grants the government's motion to dismiss the case with prejudice.	
August 15, 2023	Gene DiGiovanni, Jr.	Federal: Entering ... in a Restricted Building or Grounds	DiGiovanni pleaded Guilty to the charge.	Sentenced on 4/24/2024 to 10 days incarceration; 12 months of Supervised Release; $25 Special Assessment; Restitution in the amount of $500; 50 hours of community service.	DiGiovanni received a full pardon on January 20, 2025
October 06, 2021	Michael James Dickinson	Federal: Civil Disorder; Assaulting ... Certain Officers; Entering ... in a Restricted Building or Grounds; Disorderly ... in a Restricted Building or Grounds; Engaging in Physical Violence in a Restricted Building or Grounds; Disorderly Conduct in a Capitol Building; Act of Physical Violence in the Capitol Grounds or Buildings	Dickinson pleaded Guilty to one charge: Assaulting ... Certain Officers. The other charges are dismissed.	Sentenced on 2/16/2023 to 20 months incarceration; 36 months of supervised release; restitution of $2,000; Special Assessment of $100.	Dickinson received a full pardon on January 20, 2025
March 03, 2023	Brandon Kelly Dillard	Federal: Entering ... in a Restricted Building or Grounds; Disorderly ... in a Restricted Building or Grounds; Disorderly Conduct in a Capitol Building; Parading ... in a Capitol Building	Dillard pleaded Guilty to one charge: Disorderly ... in a Restricted Building or Grounds. The other charges are dismissed.	Sentenced on 4/9/2024 to 4 months incarceration, with credit for time served; 1 year term of supervised release; $25 special assessment; $500 in restitution.	Dillard received a full pardon on January 20, 2025
August 23, 2022	Kaleb Dillard	Federal: Civil Disorder; Assaulting Resisting or Impeding Certain Officers (2 counts); Destruction of Government Property; Entering ... in a Restricted Building or Grounds; Disorderly ... in a Restricted Building or Grounds; Engaging in Physical Violence in a Restricted Building or Grounds; Disorderly Conduct in a Capitol Building; Act of Physical Violence in the Capitol Grounds or Buildings; Parading ... in a Capitol Building	Dillard pleaded Guilty to one charge: Assaulting ... Certain Officers. The other charges are dismissed.	Sentenced on 11/16/2023 to 10 months incarceration; 12 months of supervised release; $36,238.55 in restitution; $100 Special Assessment; Fine of $5,500.	Dillard received a full pardon on January 20, 2025
May 11, 2021	Brittiany Angelina Dillon	Federal: Disorderly Conduct in a Capitol Building and Grounds	Dillon pleaded Guilty to: Disorderly Conduct in a Capitol Building and Grounds.	Sentenced 11/4/2021 to 3 years of probation with 2 months of home detention; $500 in restitution and a $10 special assessment; must seek and maintain at least part-time employment.	Dillon received a full pardon on January 20, 2025
February 13, 2023	Michael John Dillon	Federal: Entering ... in an Restricted Building or Grounds; Disorderly or Disruptive Conduct in a Restricted Building or Grounds; Disorderly Conduct in a Capitol Building; Parading ... in a Capitol Building	Dillon pleaded Guilty to one charge: Entering ... in a Restricted Building or Grounds. The other charges are dismissed.	Sentenced on 5/16/2024 to 45 days incarceration; 12 months Supervised Release; $25 Special Assessment; $500 Restitution.	Dillon received a full pardon on January 20, 2025
May 29, 2024	John Dine	Federal: Entering ... in a Restricted Building or Grounds; Disorderly ... in a Restricted Building or Grounds; Disorderly Conduct in a Capitol Building or Grounds; Parading ... in a Capitol Building	Dine pleaded Guilty to two charges: Disorderly Conduct in a Capitol Building or Grounds; Parading ... in a Capitol Building. The other charges are dismissed.	Sentenced on 11/1/2024 to 12 Months of Probation; Special Assessment of $20; Fine of $500; Restitution of $500.	Dine received a full pardon on January 20, 2025
October 04, 2023	Derek Jaccob Dodder	Federal: Entering ... in a Restricted Building or Grounds; Disorderly ... in a Restricted Building or Grounds; Disorderly Conduct on Capitol Grounds; Parading ... in Capitol Building	Dodder pleaded Guilty to two charges: Disorderly Conduct on Capitol Grounds; Parading ... in Capitol Building. The other charges are dismissed.	Sentenced on 7/11/2024 to 14 Days of Incarceration; 12 Months of Probation (with conditions); Restitution of $500; Special Assessment of $20; 60 hours of community service.	Dodder received a full pardon on January 20, 2025
November 15, 2022	Russell Dodge, Jr.	Federal: Entering ... in a Restricted Building or Grounds; Disorderly ... in a Restricted Building or Grounds; Disorderly Conduct on Capitol Grounds; Parading ... in Capitol Building	Dodge pleaded Guilty to one charge: Parading ... in Capitol Building. The other charges are dismissed.	Sentenced on 9/15/2023 to 9 months of Probation; $1,000 fine; $500 in restitution; $10 special assessment; 60 hours of community service.	Dodge received a full pardon on January 20, 2025
October 17, 2024	John-Everett Doling	Federal: Entering ... in a Restricted Building or Grounds; Disorderly ... in a Restricted Building or Grounds; Disorderly Conduct in a Capitol Building; Parading ... in a Capitol Building	Doling pleaded Guilty to two charges: Disorderly Conduct in a Capitol Building; Parading ... in a Capitol Building.	Sentencing set for 3/24/2025. On 1/22/2025, the court grants the government's motion to dismiss the case with prejudice.	
May 27, 2021	Jason Dolan	Federal: Conspiracy; Obstruction of an Official Proceeding and Aiding and Abetting; Destruction of Government Property and Aiding and Abetting; Restricted Building or Grounds; Civil Disorder and Aiding and Abetting	Dolan pleaded Guilty to two charges: Conspiracy and Obstruction of an Official Proceeding. The other charges are dismissed.	Sentenced on 11/22/2024 to 36 months Probation; special assessment of $200; restitution of $2,000.	Dolan received a full pardon on January 20, 2025
September 26, 2024	Wendy Dominski	Federal: Entering or Remaining in a Restricted Building or Grounds; Disorderly or Disruptive Conduct in a Restricted Building or Grounds; Disorderly Conduct in a Capitol Building; Parading ... in a Capitol Building	Dominski pleaded Not Guilty to all charges.	On 1/22/2025, the court grants the government's motion to dismiss the case with prejudice	
March 17, 2021	Charles Donohoe	Federal: Conspiracy to Obstruct Official Proceeding; Obstruction of an Official Proceeding and Aiding and Abetting; Civil Disorder and Aiding and Abetting; Destruction of Government Property and Aiding and Abetting (2 counts); Assaulting ... Certain Officers (2 counts)	Donohoe pleaded Guilty to two charges: Conspiracy to Obstruct an Official Proceeding; and Assaulting ... Certain Officers. The other charges are dismissed.	Sentenced on 12/19/2023 to 40 months of Incarceration; 36 months of Supervised Release; Restitution of $2,000; $200 Special Assessment.	Donohoe received a full pardon on January 20, 2025
June 30, 2021	Joshua Christopher Doolin	Federal: Theft in a Federal Enclave; Theft of Government Property; Civil Disorder; Entering ... in a Restricted Building or Grounds; Disorderly ... in a Restricted Building or Grounds	Doolin pleaded Not Guilty to all charges. In a Bench trial concluded on 3/15/2023, he was found Not Guilty of one charge: Theft in a Federal Enclave. Found Guilty of Theft of Government Property; Civil Disorder; Entering ... in a Restricted Building or Grounds; Disorderly ... in a Restricted Building or Grounds.	Sentenced on 8/16/2023 to 18 months incarceration; 36 months supervised release; $175 special assessment. On 8/14/2024, his sentence was reduced to 15 months.	Doolin received a full pardon on January 20, 2025
April 17, 2024	Robert Steven Dowell	Federal: Disorderly Conduct in a Capitol Building; Parading ... in a Capitol Building	Dowell pleaded Guilty to both charges.	Sentenced on 8/26/2024 to 12 Months of Probation; Special Assessment of $20; Fine of $1,000; Restitution of $500.	Dowell received a full pardon on January 20, 2025
February 25, 2021	Danielle Nicole Doyle	Federal: Entering ... in a Restricted Building; Disorderly ... in a Restricted Building; Violent Entry and Disorderly Conduct in a Capitol Building; Parading ... in a Capitol Building	Doyle pleaded Guilty to one count: Parading ... in a Capitol Building. The other charges were dismissed.	Sentenced 10/1/2021 to 2 months Probation; a $3,000.00 Fine; $10 special assessment; and $500 restitution.	Doyle received a full pardon on January 20, 2025
June 13, 2023	Kimberly Rae Dragoo	Federal: Entering ... in a Restricted Building or Grounds; Disorderly ... in a Restricted Building or Grounds; Disorderly or Disruptive Conduct in the Capitol Grounds or Building; Parading ... in the Capitol Building	Dragoo pleaded Guilty to one charge: Parading ... in the Capitol Building. The other charges are dismissed.	Sentenced on 4/19/2024 to 36 Months Probation With A Condition Of Intermittent Confinement; Special Assessment Of $10; Restitution of $500; Fine Of $5000.	Dragoo received a full pardon on January 20, 2025
June 13, 2023	Steven Michael Dragoo	Federal: Entering ... in a Restricted Building or Grounds; Disorderly ... in a Restricted Building or Grounds; Disorderly or Disruptive Conduct in the Capitol Grounds or Building; Parading ... in the Capitol Building	Dragoo pleaded Guilty to one charge: Parading ... in the Capitol Building. The other charges are dismissed.	Sentenced on 4/19/2024 to 36 Months Probation; 14 days intermittent confinement; Special Assessment of $10; Restitution of $500; Fine Of $5,000.	Dragoo received a full pardon on January 20, 2025
January 20, 2021	Karl Dresch	Federal: Obstruction of an Official Proceeding; Entering ... Restricted Building or Grounds; Disorderly ... Restricted Building or Grounds; Disorderly Conduct in a Capitol Building; Parading ... in a Capitol Building	Guilty – one charge: Parading ... in a Capitol Building. The other charges were dismissed.	Time Served (6 months) with no term of supervised release imposed. Special Assessment of $10 and Restitution in the amount of $500 was imposed. Defendant was released. Date: August 5, 2021	Remained in custody until he pled guilty to a misdemeanor and was released due to time served.
July 13, 2021	Joshua Dressel	Federal: Entering ... in a Restricted Building and Grounds; Disorderly ... in a Restricted Building and Grounds; Violent Entry and Disorderly Conduct in a Capitol Building; Parading ... in a Capitol Building	Dressel pleaded Guilty to one charge: Parading ... in a Capitol Building. The other charges are dismissed.	Sentenced on 3/21/2023 to 14 days incarceration; $500 fine; $500 in restitution; $10 special assessment.	Dressel received a full pardon on January 20, 2025
October 01, 2021	Lawrence Dropkin Jr.	Federal: Entering ... in a Restricted Building or Grounds; Disorderly ... in a Restricted Building or Grounds; Disorderly Conduct in a Capitol Building; Parading ... in a Capitol Building	Dropkin pleaded Guilty to all charges.	Sentenced on 10/7/2022 to 30 days of incarceration; one year of supervised release; 60 hours of community service; $500 restitution; $70 special assessment.	Dropkin received a full pardon on January 20, 2025
March 06, 2024	Patrick Duffy	Federal: Entering ... in a Restricted Building or Grounds; Disorderly ... in a Restricted Building or Grounds; Disorderly Conduct in a Capitol Building; Parading ... in a Capitol Building	Duffy pleaded Guilty to two charges: Disorderly Conduct in a Capitol Building; Parading ... in a Capitol Building.	Sentencing set for 5/6/2025. On 1/23/2025, the court grants the government's motion to dismiss the case with prejudice	
February 01, 2024	Bryan Dula	Federal: Entering ... in a Restricted Building or Grounds; Disorderly ... in a Restricted Building or Grounds; Disorderly Conduct in a Capitol Building or Grounds; Parading ... in a Capitol Building	Dula pleaded Guilty to two charges: Disorderly Conduct in a Capitol Building or Grounds; Parading ... in a Capitol Building. The other charges are dismissed.	Sentenced on 10/1/2024 to 3 Years of Probation; Special Assessment of $20; Restitution of $500; Fine of $1,000; 200 hours of community service.	Dula received a full pardon on January 20, 2025
February 23, 2024	Cleophus Dulaney	Federal: Assaulting ... Certain Officers; Obstruction of Law Enforcement during Civil Disorder; Entering ... in a Restricted Building or Grounds; Disorderly ... in a Restricted Building or Grounds; Engaging in Physical Violence in a Restricted Building or Grounds; Disorderly or Disruptive Conduct in the Capitol Grounds or Buildings; Act of Physical Violence in the Capitol Grounds or Buildings		On 1/22/2025, the court grants the government's motion to dismiss the case with prejudice.	
October 05, 2022	William Dunfee	Federal: Civil Disorder; Obstruction of an Official Proceeding; Entering ... in a Restricted Building or Grounds; Disorderly ... in a Restricted Building or Grounds; Engaging in Physical Violence in a Restricted Building or Grounds; Disorderly Conduct in a Capitol Building; Act of Physical Violence in the Capitol Grounds or Buildings.	Dunfee pleaded Not Guilty to all charges. Found Guilty on three charges on 1/22/2024 in a Bench trial: Civil Disorder; Obstruction of an Official Proceeding; Entering ... in a Restricted Building or Grounds. The other charges are dismissed. On 8/6/2024, the conviction on Obstruction is vacated and dismissed by the court.	Sentenced on 9/19/2024 to 30 months incarceration; 36 months of supervised release; $10,000 fine; $2,000 in restitution:$125 special assessment.	Dunfee received a full pardon on January 20, 2025
July 02, 2021	Fi Duong	Federal: Civil Disorder	Duong pleaded Guilty to the charge.	Sentenced on 11/5/2024 to 36 months of Probation; Special Assessment: $100; Restitution: $2,000; 50 hours of community service.	Duong received a full pardon on January 20, 2025
June 13, 2023	Long Duong	Federal: Entering ... in a Restricted Building or Grounds; Disorderly ... in a Restricted Building or Grounds; Disorderly Conduct in a Capitol Building or Grounds; Parading ... in a Capitol Building	Duong pleaded Guilty to one charge: Entering ... in a Restricted Building or Grounds. The other charges are dismissed.	Sentenced on 4/26/2024 to 36 months of probation; $500 restitution; $25 special assessment; 50 hours of community service.	Duong received a full pardon on January 20, 2025
July 17, 2023	Tyler Bradley Dykes	Federal: Robbery; Civil Disorder; Assaulting ... Certain Officers Using a Dangerous Weapon (2 counts); Entering ... in a Restricted Building or Grounds with a Deadly or Dangerous Weapon; Disorderly ... in a Restricted Building or Grounds with a Deadly or Dangerous Weapon; Engaging in Physical Violence in a Restricted Building or Grounds with a Deadly or Dangerous Weapon; Disorderly Conduct in a Capitol Building; Act of Physical Violence in the Capitol Grounds or Buildings; Parading ... in a Capitol Building	Dykes pleaded Guilty to two lesser charges: Assaulting ... Certain Officers. The other charges are dismissed.	Sentenced on 7/19/2024 to 57 months incarceration; 36 months supervised release; $20,000 fine; $2,000 Restitution; Special Assessment of $200.	Dykes received a full pardon on January 20, 2025
April 11, 2023	Rockne Gerard Earles	Federal: Civil Disorder; Assaulting ... Certain Officers; Assaulting ... Certain Officers Using a Dangerous Weapon; Entering ... in a Restricted Building or Grounds with a Deadly or Dangerous Weapon; Disorderly ... in a Restricted Building or Grounds with a Deadly or Dangerous Weapon; Engaging in Physical Violence in a Restricted Building or Grounds with a Deadly or Dangerous Weapon; Disorderly Conduct in a Capitol Building; Act of Physical Violence in the Capitol Grounds or Buildings; Parading ... in a Capitol Building	Earles pleaded Guilty to two charges: Assaulting ... Certain Officers; Assaulting ... Certain Officers Using a Dangerous Weapon.	Sentencing set for 1/10/2025. On 1/22/2025, the court grants the government's motion to dismiss the case with prejudice.	
December 08, 2022	Isreal James Easterday	Federal: Civil Disorder; Assaulting ... Certain Officers Using a Dangerous Weapon (2 counts); Entering ... in a Restricted Building or Grounds with a Deadly or Dangerous Weapon; Disorderly ... in a Restricted Building or Grounds with a Deadly or Dangerous Weapon; Engaging in Physical Violence in a Restricted Building or Grounds with a Deadly or Dangerous Weapon; Disorderly Conduct in a Capitol Building; Act of Physical Violence in the Capitol Grounds or Buildings; Parading ... in a Capitol Building	Easterday pleaded Not Guilty to all charges. Found Guilty on all charges in a Jury trial on 10/26/2023.	Sentenced on 4/22/2024 to 30 months incarceration; 2 years Supervised Release; Special Assessment of $630; Restitution in the amount of $2,000; 500 hours of community service.	Easterday received a full pardon on January 20, 2025
September 20, 2021	Michael Eckerman	Federal: Civil Disorder; Assaulting ... Certain Officers; Entering ... in a Restricted Building or Grounds; Disorderly ... in a Restricted Building or Grounds; Engaging in Physical Violence in a Restricted Building or Grounds; Disorderly Conduct in a Capitol Building; Act of Physical Violence in the Capitol Grounds or Buildings; Parading ... in a Capitol Building	Eckerman pleaded Guilty to one charge: Assaulting ... Certain Officers or Employees. The other charges are dismissed.	Sentenced 3/8/2023 to 20 months incarceration, with credit for 1 day; 24 months of supervised release; $100 special assessment; $2,000 in restitution.	Eckerman received a full pardon on January 20, 2025
May 04, 2021	Gary Edwards	Federal: Entering ... in a Restricted Building or Grounds; Disorderly ... in a Restricted Building or Grounds; Disruption of Official Business; Disorderly Conduct in a Capitol Building; Parading ... in a Capitol Building	Edwards pleaded Guilty to one charge: Parading ... in a Capitol Building. The other charges are dismissed.	Sentenced 12/20/2021 to 1 year of probation; a $2,500 fine; $10 special assessment; $500 restitution; 200 hours of community service.	Edwards received a full pardon on January 20, 2025
February 16, 2021	Daniel Dean Egtvedt	Federal: Assaulting ... Certain Officers (2 counts); Civil Disorder; Obstruction of an Official Proceeding; Entering ... in a Restricted Building or Grounds; Disorderly ... in a Restricted Building or Grounds; Engaging in Physical Violence in a Restricted Building or Grounds; Disorderly Conduct on Capitol Grounds or in a Capitol Building; Impeding Passage Through the Capitol Grounds or Buildings	Egtvedt pleaded Not Guilty to all charges. Bench trial was held from 12/5/2022 -12/8/2022. He was found Guilty on charges 1-6 and 8; and Not Guilty on charges 7 and 9.	Sentenced on 3/16/2023 to 42 months incarceration; 36 months supervised release; special assessment of $460 and $2,000 in restitution. On 9/9/2024, the USCA vacated the Obstruction conviction. On 1/22/2025, the court grants the government's motion to dismiss the case with prejudice	
January 13, 2021	Hunter Allen Ehmke	Federal: Destruction of Government Property; Obstruction of an Official Proceeding; Disorderly Conduct in a Capitol Building; Parading ... in a Capitol Building	Ehmke pleaded Guilty to one charge: Destruction of Government Property. The other charges are dismissed.	Sentenced on 5/13/2022 to 4 months incarceration; 36 months of supervised release; $2,821 restitution; $100 special assessment.	Ehmke received a full pardon on January 20, 2025
January 19, 2021	Valerie Elaine Ehrke	Federal: Entering ... in a Restricted Building; Disorderly ... in a Restricted Building; Violent Entry and Disorderly Conduct in a Capitol Building; Parading ... in a Capitol Building	Ehrke pleaded Guilty to one charge: Parading ... in a Capitol Building. The other charges were dismissed.	Sentenced 9/17/2021 to 3 years probation; $500 restitution; $10 assessment fee; and 120 hours of community service.	Ehrke received a full pardon on January 20, 2025
January 31, 2022	Jolene Eicher	Federal: Entering ... in a Restricted Building or Grounds; Disorderly ... in a Restricted Building or Grounds; Disorderly Conduct in a Capitol Building; Parading ... in a Capitol Building	Eicher pleaded Not Guilty to all charges. On 6/14/2023 she was found Guilty on all charges in a Jury trial.	Sentenced on 9/15/2023 to 2 months incarceration; 12 months supervised release; $70 special assessment; $500 restitution.	Eicher received a full pardon on January 20, 2025
January 16, 2021	Lisa Marie Eisenhart	Federal: Conspiracy to Commit Obstruction; Obstruction of an Official Proceeding; Entering ... in a Restricted Building; Disorderly ... in a Restricted Building or Grounds; Entering ... in the Gallery of Congress; Disorderly Conduct in a Capitol Building; Parading ... in a Capitol Building	Eisenhart pleaded Not Guilty to all charges. Found Guilty on all charges in a stipulated bench trial on 4/18/2023.	Sentenced on 9/8/2023 to 30 months incarceration; 3 years supervised release; $2,000 restitution; $280 special assessment. On 11/20/2024, a federal appeals court vacated the felony charges. Resentencing hearing begun 1/16/2025. On 1/21/2025, the court grants the government's motion to dismiss the case with prejudice.	
April 02, 2023	David Elizalde	Federal: Entering ... in a Restricted Building or Grounds; Disorderly ... in a Restricted Building or Grounds; Disorderly Conduct in a Capitol Building; Parading ... in a Capitol Building	In a Bench trial on 12/6/2023, Elizalde was found Guilty on one charge: Parading ... in a Capitol Building; and Not Guilty on the other three charges.	Sentenced on 4/19/2024 to 30 days home detention; $10 special assessment; $2,500 fine.	Elizalde received a full pardon on January 20, 2025
December 20, 2021	James Robert Elliott	Federal: Civil Disorder; Assaulting ... Certain Officers Using a Deadly or Dangerous Weapon; Entering ... in a Restricted Building or Grounds with a Deadly or Dangerous Weapon; Disorderly ... in a Restricted Building or Grounds with a Deadly or Dangerous Weapon; Engaging in Physical Violence in a Restricted Building or Grounds with a Deadly and Dangerous Weapon; Act of Physical Violence in the Capitol Grounds or Buildings	Elliott pleaded Guilty to one charge: Assaulting ... Certain Officers or Employees. The other charges are dismissed.	Sentenced on 6/22/2023 to 37 months of incarceration; 24 months of supervised release; $100 special assessment; $2,000 restitution.	Elliott received a full pardon on January 20, 2025
July 15, 2021	Nathan Wayne Entrekin	Federal: Entering ... in a Restricted Building or Grounds; Disorderly ... in a Restricted Building or Grounds; Entering ... in Certain Rooms in the Capitol Building; Disorderly Conduct in a Capitol Building; Parading ... in a Capitol Building	Entrekin pleaded Guilty to one charge: Parading ... in a Capitol Building. The other charges are dismissed.	Sentenced to 45 days incarceration; 36 months Probation with conditions; $10 Special Assessment; Restitution of $500; 60 hours community service.	Entrekin received a full pardon on January 20, 2025
September 18, 2023	James Ray Epps, Sr.	Federal: Disorderly or Disruptive Conduct in a Restricted Building or Grounds	Epps pleaded Guilty to the charge.	Sentenced on 1/9/2024 to 12 months probation; $25 special assessment; $500 restitution; 100 hours of community service.	Epps received a full pardon on January 20, 2025
January 22, 2021	Andrew Craig Ericson	Federal: Entering ... in a Restricted Building; Disorderly ... in a Restricted Building; Violent Entry and Disorderly Conduct in a Capitol Building; Parading ... in a Capitol Building	Ericson pleaded Guilty to one charge: Parading ... in a Capitol Building. The other charges are dismissed.	Sentenced 12/10/2021 to 20 days of intermittent confinement (serving the sentence on consecutive weekends); 24 months of probation; $10.00 Special Assessment; $500 in restitution.	Ericson received a full pardon on January 20, 2025
October 21, 2022	Richard J. Escalera	Federal: Entering ... in a Restricted Building or Grounds; Disorderly ... in a Restricted Building or Grounds; Disorderly Conduct in a Capitol Building; Parading ... in a Capitol Building	Escalera pleaded Guilty to one charge: Parading ... in a Capitol Building. The other charges are dismissed.	Sentenced on 8/3/2023 to 7 days incarceration; 24 months probation; 60 hours of community service; $10 special assessment.	Escalera received a full pardon on January 20, 2025
March 26, 2024	Charles Anthony Espinosa	Federal: Knowingly Entering or Remaining in any Restricted Building or Grounds Without Lawful Authority; Knowingly, and with Intent to Impede or Disrupt the Orderly Conduct of Government Business or Official Functions; Willfully and Knowingly Utter Loud, Threatening, or Abusive Language, or Engage in Disorderly or Disruptive Conduct, at any place on Capitol Grounds with the Intent to Impede, Disrupt or Disturb Congress; Parade, Demonstrate, or Picket on Capitol Grounds		On 1/22/2025, the court grants the government's motion to dismiss the case with prejudice.	
September 23, 2022	Michelle Alexandra Estey	Federal: Entering ... in a Restricted Building or Grounds; Disorderly ... in a Restricted Building or Grounds; Disorderly Conduct in a Capitol Building; Parading ... in a Capitol Building	Estey pleaded Guilty to one charge: Parading ... in a Capitol Building. The other charges are dismissed.	Sentenced on 2/26/2024 to 36 months Probation; Special assessment of $10; restitution of $500; Fine of $2,000; 250 hours of community service.	Estey received a full pardon on January 20, 2025
July 08, 2022	Tyler Earl Ethridge	Federal: Civil Disorder; Obstruction of an Official Proceeding; Entering ... in a Restricted Building or Grounds; Disorderly ... in a Restricted Building or Grounds; Disorderly Conduct in a Capitol Building; Parading ... in a Capitol Building	Ethridge pleaded Not Guilty to all charges. Found Guilty on all charges in a stipulated bench trial on 9/8/2023. Court dismisses count 2, the Obstruction charge, on 8/29/2024.	Sentenced on 9/25/2024 to 7 Months incarceration; Supervised Release of 24 months; 210 days of location monitoring; Special Assessment of $170; Restitution of $2,000; 60 hours of community service.	Ethridge received a full pardon on January 20, 2025
February 24, 2023	Jeffrey Michael Etter	Federal: Entering ... in a Restricted Building or Grounds; Disorderly ... in a Restricted Building or Grounds; Disorderly Conduct in a Capitol Building; Parading ... in a Capitol Building	Etter pleaded Guilty to one charge: Parading ... in a Capitol Building. The other charges are dismissed.	Sentenced on 9/11/2023 to 36 Months of Probation; Special Assessment of $10; Restitution of $500; Fine of $5,000; 400 hours of community service.	Etter received a full pardon on January 20, 2025
January 08, 2021	Derrick Evans	Federal: Impeding, Obstructing or Interfering with Law Enforcement During a Civil Disorder	Evans pleaded Guilty to the single charge.	Sentenced 6/22/2022 to three months in jail, three years of supervised release, $2,000 fine, $2,000 restitution; $100 special assessment.	Evans received a full pardon on January 20, 2025
May 08, 2024	Nathaniel Jesse Evans	Federal: Entering or Remaining in a Restricted Building or Grounds; Disorderly ... in a Restricted Building or Grounds; Disorderly Conduct in a Capitol Building; Parading, Picketing, or Demonstrating in a Capitol Building	Evans pleaded Not Guilty to all charges. Jury Trial to begin on 2/14/2025.	On 1/21/2025, the court grants the government's motion to dismiss the case with prejudice	
March 04, 2021	Treniss Jewel Evans III	Federal: Obstruction of an Official Proceeding; Entering ... in a Restricted Building or Grounds; Disorderly ... in a Restricted Building or Grounds; Disorderly Conduct in a Capitol Building; Parading ... in a Capitol Building	Evans III pleaded Guilty to one charge: Entering ... in a Restricted Building or Grounds. The other charges are dismissed.	Sentenced on 11/21/2022 to 36 months of probation, including 20 days of intermittent incarceration, $5,000 fine, $500 restitution; $25 special assessment.	Evans received a full pardon on January 20, 2025
October 08, 2024	Michael T. Fagundes	Federal: Civil Disorder; Assaulting ... Certain Officers (2 counts); Entering ... in a Restricted Building or Grounds; Disorderly ... in a Restricted Building or Grounds; Engaging in Physical Violence in a Restricted Building or Grounds; Disorderly Conduct in a Capitol Building; Act of Physical Violence in the Capitol Grounds or Buildings; Parading ... in a Capitol Building		On 1/22/2025, the court grants the government's motion to dismiss the case with prejudice.	
August 27, 2021	Robert Flynt Fairchild Jr.	Federal: Civil Disorder; Obstruction of an Official Proceeding; Assaulting ... Certain Officers; Entering ... in a Restricted Building or Grounds; Disorderly ... in a Restricted Building or Grounds; Engaging in Physical Violence in a Restricted Building or Grounds; Disorderly Conduct in a Capitol Building; Act of Physical Violence in the Capitol Grounds or Buildings; Parading ... in a Capitol Building	Fairchild pleaded Guilty to one charge: Civil Disorder. The other charges are dismissed.	Sentenced on 10/20/2022 to 6 Months of Incarceration; Special Assessment of $100; Restitution of $2,000.	Fairchild received a full pardon on January 20, 2025
January 22, 2021	Scott Kevin Fairlamb	Federal: Civil Disorder; Obstruction of an Official Proceeding; Assaulting ... Certain Officers; Entering ... Restricted Building or Grounds with a Deadly or Dangerous Weapon; Disorderly ... Restricted Building or Grounds with a Deadly or Dangerous Weapon; Impeding Ingress and Egress in a Restricted Building or Grounds; Engaging in Physical Violence in a Restricted Building or Grounds; Disorderly Conduct in a Capitol Building; Impeding Passage Through the Capitol Grounds or Buildings; Act of Physical Violence in the Capitol Grounds or Buildings; Parading ... in a Capitol Building; Stepping, Climbing, Removing, or Injuring Property on the Capitol Grounds	Guilty – two felony charges: Obstruction of an Official Proceeding; and Assaulting ... Certain Officers. The other charges are dismissed. (August 6, 2021)	41 months in jail. Date: November 10, 2021	Gym owner and martial arts instructor from New Jersey. First participant to plead guilty to assaulting a Metro DC Police officer (along with Devlyn D. Thompson). His sentence was the longest of the 32 sentences issued up to that point.
July 13, 2023	Alexander Fan	Federal: Entering ... in a Restricted Building or Grounds; Disorderly ... in a Restricted Building or Grounds; Disorderly Conduct in a Capitol Building or Grounds; Enter and Remain in a Room in a Capitol Building; Obstruct or Impede Passage in a Capitol Building	Fan pleaded Guilty to one charge: Enter and Remain in a Room in a Capitol Building. The other charges are dismissed.	Sentenced on 2/16/2024 to 12 months probation; $10 special assessment; $500 restitution; 100 hours of community service.	Fan received a full pardon on January 20, 2025
December 05, 2022	Isaiah Farnsworth	Federal: Destruction of Government Property; Entering ... in a Restricted Building or Grounds; Disorderly ... in a Restricted Building or Grounds; Engaging in Physical Violence in a Restricted Building or Grounds; Disorderly Conduct in a Capitol Building; Act of Physical Violence in the Capitol Grounds or Buildings; Parading ... in a Capitol Building	Farnsworth pleaded Guilty to one charge: Destruction of Government Property. The other charges are dismissed.	Sentenced on 9/8/2023 to 3 months of incarceration; 36 months of supervised release; $100 special assessment; $11,860 restitution; 100 hours of community service.	Farnsworth received a full pardon on January 20, 2025
February 06, 2023	Jason Farris	Federal: Civil Disorder; Assaulting ... Certain Officers; Entering ... in a Restricted Building or Grounds; Disorderly ... in a Restricted Building or Grounds; Engaging in Physical Violence in a Restricted Building or Grounds	Farris pleaded Guilty to one charge: Assaulting ... Certain Officers.	Sentenced on 2/23/2024 to 18 months of incarceration; 24 months of Supervised Release; a Special Assessment of $100; restitution in the amount of $2,000.	Farris received a full pardon on January 20, 2025
September 15, 2021	Marilyn Fassell	Federal: Entering or Remaining in a Restricted Building or Grounds; Disorderly ... in a Restricted Building or Grounds; Disorderly Conduct in a Capitol Building; Parading ... in a Capitol Building	Fassell pleaded Guilty to one charge: Parading ... in a Capitol Building. The other charges are dismissed.	Sentenced on 12/9/2022 to 30 days incarceration followed by 3 years Supervised Probation; a Special Assessment of $10; restitution of $500.	Fassell received a full pardon on January 20, 2025
September 15, 2021	Thomas Fassell	Federal: Entering or Remaining in a Restricted Building or Grounds; Disorderly ... in a Restricted Building or Grounds; Disorderly Conduct in a Capitol Building; Parading ... in a Capitol Building	Fassell pleaded Guilty to one charge: Parading ... in a Capitol Building. The other charges are dismissed.	Sentenced on 12/9/2022 to 7 days intermittent incarceration followed by 2 years Probation; a Special Assessment of $10; $500 restitution.	Fassell received a full pardon on January 20, 2025
June 08, 2023	Renee Fatta	Federal: Entering ... in a Restricted Building or Grounds; Disorderly ... in a Restricted Building or Grounds; Disorderly Conduct in a Capitol Building or Grounds; Parading ... in a Capitol Building	Fatta pleaded Guilty to one charge: Parading ... in a Capitol Building. The other charges are dismissed.	Sentenced on 10/25/2023 to 24 Months of Probation; Restitution of $500; Special Assessment of $10; Fine of $250; 50 hours of community service.	Fatta received a full pardon on January 20, 2025. On January 15, 2026, Fatta was arrested on harassment and trespass charges arising out of a package delivery dispute with her neighbor.
January 29, 2021	Troy Elbert Faulkner	Federal: Destruction of Government Property; Obstruction of an Official Proceeding; Entering ... in Restricted Building or Grounds; Disorderly ... in a Restricted Building or Grounds; Engaging in Physical Violence in a Restricted Building or Grounds; Disorderly Conduct in a Capitol Building; Stepping, Climbing, Removing, or Injuring Property on the Capitol Grounds	Faulkner pleaded Guilty to one charge: Destruction of Government Property. The other charges are dismissed.	Sentenced 11/3/2022 to 5 months incarceration with credit for time served; 36 months of supervised release; a special assessment of $100; restitution of $10,560.	Faulkner received a full pardon on January 20, 2025
December 08, 2021	Luke Faulkner	Federal: Entering ... in a Restricted Building or Grounds; Disorderly ... in a Restricted Building or Grounds; Disorderly Conduct in a Capitol Building; Parading ... in a Capitol Building	Faulkner pleaded Guilty to one charge: Parading ... in a Capitol Building. The other charges are dismissed.	Sentenced on 1/20/2023 to 24 Months of Probation; 30 days location monitoring; $500 Restitution; Special Assessment of $10; 60 hours of community service.	Faulkner received a full pardon on January 20, 2025
January 19, 2021	Thomas Fee	Federal: Entering ... in a Restricted Building; Disorderly ... in a Restricted Building; Violent Entry and Disorderly Conduct in a Capitol Building; Parading ... in a Capitol Building	Fee pleaded Guilty to one charge: Parading ... in a Capitol Building. The other charges are dismissed.	Sentenced 4/1/2022 to 24 months probation; 50 hours community service; $500 fine; $500 restitution; $10 special assessment.	Fee received a full pardon on January 20, 2025
January 17, 2021	Brandon Fellows	Federal: Obstruction of an Official Proceeding; Entering ... in a Restricted Building or Grounds; Disorderly ... in a Restricted Building or Grounds; Entering ... in Certain Rooms in the Capitol Building; Disorderly Conduct in a Capitol Building	Fellows pleaded Not Guilty to all charges. The Court found the defendant in criminal contempt and sentenced the defendant to five months incarceration, to commence at the conclusion of his trial. Found Guilty on all charges in a Jury trial on 8/31/2023.	Sentenced on 2/29/2024 to 37 Months of Incarceration; 36 Months of Supervised Release; Special Assessment of $170; Restitution of $2,000.	Fellows received a full pardon on January 20, 2025
May 12, 2022	Jamie Lynn Ferguson	Federal: Entering ... in a Restricted Building or Grounds; Disorderly ... in a Restricted Building or Grounds; Disorderly Conduct in a Capitol Building; Parading ... in a Capitol Building	Ferguson pleaded Guilty to one charge: Parading ... in a Capitol Building. The other charges are dismissed.	Sentenced on 12/23/2022 to 24 months probation; 60 hours of community service; $500 restitution; $10 special assessment.	Ferguson received a full pardon on January 20, 2025
February 16, 2022	Leticia Vilhena Ferreira	Federal: Parading ... in a Capitol Building	Ferreira pleaded Guilty to the single charge.	Sentenced on 10/6/2022 to 14 days of incarceration; 36 months probation; $10 Special Assessment; Restitution of $500; 60 hours of community service.	Ferreira received a full pardon on January 20, 2025
August 31, 2021	Antonio Ferrigno Jr.	Federal: Entering ... in a Restricted Building; Disorderly ... in a Restricted Building; Violent Entry and Disorderly Conduct in a Capitol Building; Parading ... in a Capitol Building	Ferrigno pleaded Guilty to one charge: Parading ... in a Capitol Building. The other charges are dismissed.	Sentenced to 12 months Probation with 2 of the twelve months to be served in Home Confinement, a Special Assessment of $10, Restitution of $500, a $371 Fine; 60 hours of community service.	Ferrigno received a full pardon on January 20, 2025
March 21, 2021	Jeffery Xavier Finley	Federal: Entering ... in a Restricted Building; Disorderly ... in a Restricted Building; Violent Entry and Disorderly Conduct in a Capitol Building; Parading ... in a Capitol Building	Finley pleaded Guilty to one charge: Entering ... in a Restricted Building. The other charges are dismissed.	Sentenced on 2/13/2023 to 75 days of incarceration; 12 months of Supervised Release; Special Assessment of $25 and Restitution of $500; 60 hours of community service.	Finley received a full pardon on January 20, 2025
March 21, 2024	Timothy Finnegan	Federal: Entering ... in a Restricted Building or Grounds; Disorderly ... in a Restricted Building or Grounds; Disorderly Conduct in a Capitol Building; Parading ... in a Capitol Building	Finnegan pleaded Guilty to two charges: Disorderly Conduct in a Capitol Building; Parading ... in a Capitol Building.	Sentencing set for 1/28/2025. On 1/22/2025, the court grants the government's motion to dismiss the case with prejudice.	
February 08, 2024	Christopher Douglas Finney	Federal: Civil Disorder	Finney pleaded Guilty to the single charge.	Sentencing set for 1/24/2025. On 1/22/2025, the court grants the government's motion to dismiss the case with prejudice.	
April 11, 2023	Frederic Fiol	Federal: Entering ... in a Restricted Building or Grounds; Disorderly ... in a Restricted Building or Grounds; Disorderly Conduct in a Capitol Building; Parading ... in a Capitol Building	Fiol pleaded Guilty to two charges: Disorderly Conduct in a Capitol Building; and Parading ... in a Capitol Building. The other charges are dismissed.	Sentenced on 3/15/2024 to 45 days incarceration; 24 months of Probation; special assessment of $20; restitution of $500.	Fiol received a full pardon on January 20, 2025
January 13, 2022	Alan Fischer, III	Federal: Civil Disorder (2 counts); Assaulting ... Certain Officers Using a Dangerous Weapon; Entering ... in a Restricted Building or Grounds with a Deadly or Dangerous Weapon; Disorderly ... in a Restricted Building or Grounds with a Deadly or Dangerous Weapon; Engaging in Physical Violence in a Restricted Building or Grounds with a Deadly or Dangerous Weapon; Disorderly Conduct in the Capitol Grounds or Buildings; Act of Physical Violence in the Capitol Grounds or Buildings	Fischer pleaded Not Guilty to all charges.	Jury trial set for 3/3/2025. On 1/21/2025, the court grants the government's motion to dismiss the case with prejudice.	
February 19, 2021	Joseph W. Fischer	Federal: Civil Disorder; Assaulting ... Certain Officers; Obstruction of an Official Proceeding; Entering ... in a Restricted Building or Grounds; Disorderly ... in a Restricted Building or Grounds; Disorderly Conduct in a Capitol Building or Grounds; Parading ... in a Capitol Building	Fischer pleaded Not Guilty to all charges.	On 1/21/2025, the court grants the government's motion to dismiss the case with prejudice	
March 30, 2023	Joseph Robert Fisher	Federal: Civil Disorder; Assaulting ... Certain Officers; Entering ... in a Restricted Building or Grounds; Disorderly ... in a Restricted Building or Grounds; Engaging in Physical Violence in a Restricted Building or Grounds; Disorderly Conduct in a Capitol Building; Act of Physical Violence in the Capitol Grounds or Buildings; Parading ... in a Capitol Building	Fisher pleaded Guilty to all charges.	Sentenced on 5/24/2024 to 20 months incarceration; 24 months supervised release; $2,000 restitution; $305 special assessment.	Fisher received a full pardon on January 20, 2025
January 20, 2021	Samuel J. Fisher	Federal: Entering ... in a Restricted Building; Disorderly ... in a Restricted Building	Fisher pleaded Guilty to one charge: Entering ... in a Restricted Building or Grounds. The other charges are dismissed.	Sentenced on 10/7/2022 to 120 days of incarceration; 12 months of supervised release; 60 hours of community service; $500 in restitution; $25 special assessment.	Fisher received a full pardon on January 20, 2025
January 12, 2021	Cindy Sue Fitchett	Federal: Entering ... in a Restricted Building; Disorderly ... in a Restricted Building; Violent Entry and Disorderly Conduct in a Capitol Building; Parading ... in a Capitol Building	Fitchett pleaded Guilty to one charge: Parading ... in a Capitol Building. The other charges were dismissed.	Sentenced 11/9/2021 to 36 months of probation with one month home detention; 60 hours community service; restitution of $500.00; Special Assessment of $10.	Fitchett received a full pardon on January 20, 2025
April 07, 2021	Michael Fitzgerald	Federal: Civil Disorder; Obstruction of an Official Proceeding; Entering ... in a Restricted Building or Grounds; Disorderly ... in a Restricted Building or Grounds; Disorderly Conduct in a Capitol Building; Parading ... in a Capitol Building	Fitzgerald pleaded Not Guilty to all charges. The court dismissed the Obstruction charge on 11/22/2024.	On 1/22/2025, the court ordered that the case is dismissed without prejudice.	
February 4, 2021	Kyle Fitzsimons	Obstruction of an official proceeding; four counts of assaulting, resisting, or impeding law enforcement officers, including two involving a dangerous weapon or bodily injury; one count of interfering with a law enforcement officer during a civil disorder, and one count of engaging in physical violence in a restricted building or grounds; entering and remaining in a restricted building or grounds; disorderly and disruptive conduct in a restricted building or grounds; disorderly conduct in a Capitol Building or grounds; and committing an act of violence in the Capitol Building or grounds	Not Guilty – all charges	Found guilty of all charges on September 27, 2022, following a bench trial. Sentenced to 87 months.	Fitzsimons received a full pardon on January 20, 2025
March 07, 2024	John Flanagan	Federal: Entering ... in a Restricted Building or Grounds; Disorderly ... in a Restricted Building or Grounds; Disorderly Conduct in a Capitol Building or Grounds; Parading ... in a Capitol Building	Flanagan pleaded Guilty to two charges: Disorderly Conduct in a Capitol Building or Grounds; Parading ... in a Capitol Building.	Sentencing set for 3/6/2025. On 1/22/2025, the court grants the government's motion to dismiss the case with prejudice	
March 07, 2024	Sarah Flanagan	Federal: Entering ... in a Restricted Building or Grounds; Disorderly ... in a Restricted Building or Grounds; Disorderly Conduct in a Capitol Building or Grounds; Parading ... in a Capitol Building	Flanagan pleaded Guilty to two charges: Disorderly Conduct in a Capitol Building or Grounds; Parading ... in a Capitol Building.	Sentencing set for 3/6/2025. On 1/22/2025, the court grants the government's motion to dismiss the case with prejudice	
August 30, 2024	James Flint-Smith	Federal: Entering ... in a Restricted Building or Grounds; Disorderly ... in a Restricted Building or Grounds; Disorderly Conduct in a Capitol Building or Grounds; Parading, Picketing, and Demonstrating in a Capitol Building or Grounds	Flint-Smith pleaded Guilty to two charges: Disorderly Conduct in a Capitol Building or Grounds; Parading, Picketing, and Demonstrating in a Capitol Building or Grounds.	Sentencing set for 4/21/2025. On 1/21/2025, the court grants the government's motion to dismiss the case with prejudice	
October 18, 2024	Steven Fogarty	Federal: Entering ... in a Restricted Building or Grounds; Disorderly ... in a Restricted Building or Grounds; Disorderly Conduct in a Capitol Building; Parading ... in a Capitol Building	Fogarty pleaded Not Guilty to all charges.	On 1/22/2025, the court grants the government's motion to dismiss the case with prejudice.	
February 01, 2024	Kelly Lynn Fontaine	Federal: Entering ... in a Restricted Building or Grounds; Disorderly ... in a Restricted Building or Grounds; Disorderly Conduct in a Capitol Building or Grounds; Parading ... in a Capitol Building	Fontaine pleaded Guilty to two charges: Disorderly Conduct in a Capitol Building or Grounds; Parading ... in a Capitol Building. The other charges are dismissed.	Sentenced on 10/1/2024 to 21 Days of Incarceration; 3 Years of Probation; Special Assessment of $20; Restitution of $500; Fine of $1,000.	Fontaine received a full pardon on January 20, 2025
July 22, 2022	Samuel Fontanez-Rodriguez	Federal: Entering ... in a Restricted Building or Grounds; Disorderly ... in a Restricted Building or Grounds; Disorderly Conduct in a Capitol Building or Grounds; Parading ... in a Capitol Building	Fontanez-Rodriguez pleaded Guilty to one charge: Parading ... in a Capitol Building. The other charges are dismissed.	Sentenced on 2/2/2023 to 12 months of Probation; Special Assessment of $10; Restitution of $500; 50 hours community service.	Fontanez-Rodriguez received a full pardon on January 20, 2025
October 26, 2021	Gilbert Fonticoba	Federal: Obstruction of an Official Proceeding; Civil Disorder; Entering ... in a Restricted Building or Grounds; Disorderly ... in a Restricted Building or Grounds; Disorderly Conduct in a Capitol Building; Parading ... in Capitol Building	Fonticoba pleaded Not Guilty to all charges. In a stipulated Bench trial on 10/6/2023, he was found Guilty of two charges: Obstruction of an Official Proceeding; Civil Disorder. The other charges are dismissed.	Sentenced on 1/11/2024 to 48 months Incarceration; 36 months of Supervised Release; $200 Special Assessment.	Fonticoba received a full pardon on January 20, 2025
January 22, 2024	Michael Gerard Fournier	Federal: Entering ... in a Restricted Building or Grounds; Disorderly ... in a Restricted Building or Grounds; Disorderly Conduct in a Capitol Building or Grounds; Parading ... in a Capitol Building	Fournier pleaded Guilty to two charges: Disorderly Conduct in a Capitol Building or Grounds; Parading ... in a Capitol Building. The other charges are dismissed.	Sentenced on 8/1/2024 to 30 days incarceration; 12 months of Probation; Special Assessment of $20; Restitution of $500; 100 hours of community service.	Fournier received a full pardon on January 20, 2025
January 15, 2025	Jorge Jose Fournier	Federal: Civil Disorder; Assaulting ... Certain Officers; Assaulting ... a Federal Officer While Carrying a Deadly or Dangerous Weapon; Entering ... in any Restricted Building or Grounds; Disorderly ... in a Restricted Building or Grounds; Disorderly ... in a Capitol Building; Parading ... in a Capitol Building		On 1/22/2025, the court grants the government's motion to dismiss the case with prejudice.	
June 23, 2021	Samuel Christopher Fox	Federal: Entering ... Restricted Building; Disorderly ... Restricted Building; Violent Entry and Disorderly Conduct; Parading ... in a Capitol Building	Guilty – one charge: Parading ... in the Capitol.	Sentenced to 36 months of probation, including 60 days' home detention, $2,500 fine, $500 restitution	
January 21, 2021	Michael Joseph Foy	Federal: Assaulting ... Certain Officers; Obstruction of an Official Proceeding	Foy pleaded Not Guilty to all charges. Found Guilty on both charges in a Stipulated Bench Trial on 6/23/2023.	Sentenced on 2/28/2024 to 40 Months Incarceration; 24 Months supervised release; Special Assessment Of $200; Restitution of $2,000.	Foy received a full pardon on January 20, 2025
January 13, 2021	Jacob Fracker	Federal: Obstruction of an Official Proceeding; Aiding and Abetting; Entering ... Restricted Building; Disorderly ... Restricted Building; Violent Entry and Disorderly Conduct in a Capitol Building or Grounds	Not Guilty – all charges; later guilty to superseding information.	12 months of probation, 59 days on home detention, 120 hours of community service, $2,000 restitution.	One of the two police officers belonging to Virginia's Rocky Mount Police Department who allegedly attended the riot off-duty and posted a picture of themselves inside the Capitol on social media, writing they were "willing to actually put skin in the game and stand up for their rights".
December 02, 2021	Roy Nelson Franklin	Federal: Obstruction of an Official Proceeding and Aiding and Abetting; Entering ... in a Restricted Building or Grounds; Disorderly ... in a Restricted Building or Grounds; Disorderly Conduct in a Capitol Building; Parade, Demonstrate, Or Picket in the Capitol Grounds or Buildings	Franklin pleaded Not Guilty to all charges.	Due to his death on 10/15/2023, the case is terminated.	
September 21, 2021	Dawn Frankowski	Federal: Entering ... in a Restricted Building or Grounds; Disorderly ... in a Restricted Building or Grounds; Disorderly Conduct in a Capitol Building; Parading ... in a Capitol Building	Frankowski pleaded Guilty to one charge: Parading ... in a Capitol Building. The other charges are dismissed.	Sentenced on 11/30/2022 to 18 months of probation, $750 fine, $500 restitution and $10 special assessment; 100 hours of community service.	Frankowski received a full pardon on January 20, 2025
February 26, 2024	Howard Raymond Freelove	Federal: Entering ... in a Restricted Building or Grounds; Disorderly ... in a Restricted Building or Grounds; Disorderly Conduct on Capitol Grounds; Parading ... in a Capitol Building	Freelove pleaded Not Guilty to all charges.	On 1/27/2025, the court grants the government's motion to dismiss the case with prejudice.	
March 19, 2024	Nolan Freeman	Federal: Entering ... in a Restricted Building or Grounds; Disorderly ... in a Restricted Building or Grounds; Disorderly Conduct in a Capitol Building; Parading ... in a Capitol Building	Freeman pleaded Guilty to two charges: Disorderly Conduct in a Capitol Building; Parading ... in a Capitol Building.	Sentencing reset for 3/12/2025. On 1/22/2025, the court grants the government's motion to dismiss the case with prejudice	
February 12, 2024	Larry Freligh, III	Federal: Entering ... in a Restricted Building or Grounds; Disorderly ... in a Restricted Building or Grounds; Disorderly Conduct in a Capitol Building; Parading ... in a Capitol Building	Freligh pleaded Guilty to one charge: Disorderly ... in a Restricted Building or Grounds. The other charges are dismissed.	Sentencing set for 1/14/2025 to 4 months of Incarceration; 12 months of Supervised Release (with conditions); $25 Special Assessment; Restitution of $500.	Freligh received a full pardon on January 20, 2025
June 14, 2023	Caleb Kenneth Fuller	Federal: Civil Disorder; Entering ... in a Restricted Building or Grounds; Disorderly ... in a Restricted Building or Grounds; Disorderly Conduct in a Capitol Building	Fuller pleaded Not Guilty to all charges.	Jury trial began on 1/13/2025. On 1/21/2025, the court grants the government's motion to dismiss the case with prejudice.	
June 16, 2023	Kenneth Wayne Fuller	Federal: Civil Disorder; Entering ... in a Restricted Building or Grounds; Disorderly ... in a Restricted Building or Grounds; Disorderly Conduct in a Capitol Building	Fuller pleaded Not Guilty to all charges.	Jury trial began on 1/13/2025. On 1/21/2025, the court grants the government's motion to dismiss the case with prejudice.	
June 14, 2023	Nicholas John Fuller	Federal: Civil Disorder; Entering ... in a Restricted Building or Grounds; Disorderly ... in a Restricted Building or Grounds; Disorderly Conduct in a Capitol Building	Fuller pleaded Guilty to one charge: Civil Disorder. The other charges are dismissed.	Sentenced on 11/8/2024 to 36 months of Probation; 180 days location monitoring; 80 hours of community service; Special Assessment of $100; Restitution of $2,000.	Fuller received a full pardon on January 20, 2025
April 25, 2024	William Irvin Fuller	Federal: Entering ... in a Restricted Building or Grounds; Disorderly Conduct in a Restricted Building or Grounds; Disorderly Conduct in a Capitol Building; Parading ... in a Capitol Building	Fuller pleaded Guilty to two charges: Disorderly Conduct in a Capitol Building; Parading ... in a Capitol Building. The other charges are dismissed.	Sentenced on 11/8/2024 to 36 Months Probation; 60 days location monitoring; Restitution of $500; Special Assessment of $20.	Fuller received a full pardon on January 20, 2025

== See also ==
- Criminal proceedings in the January 6 United States Capitol attack
