= Planning of the January 6 United States Capitol attack =

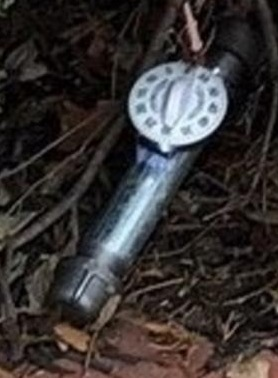
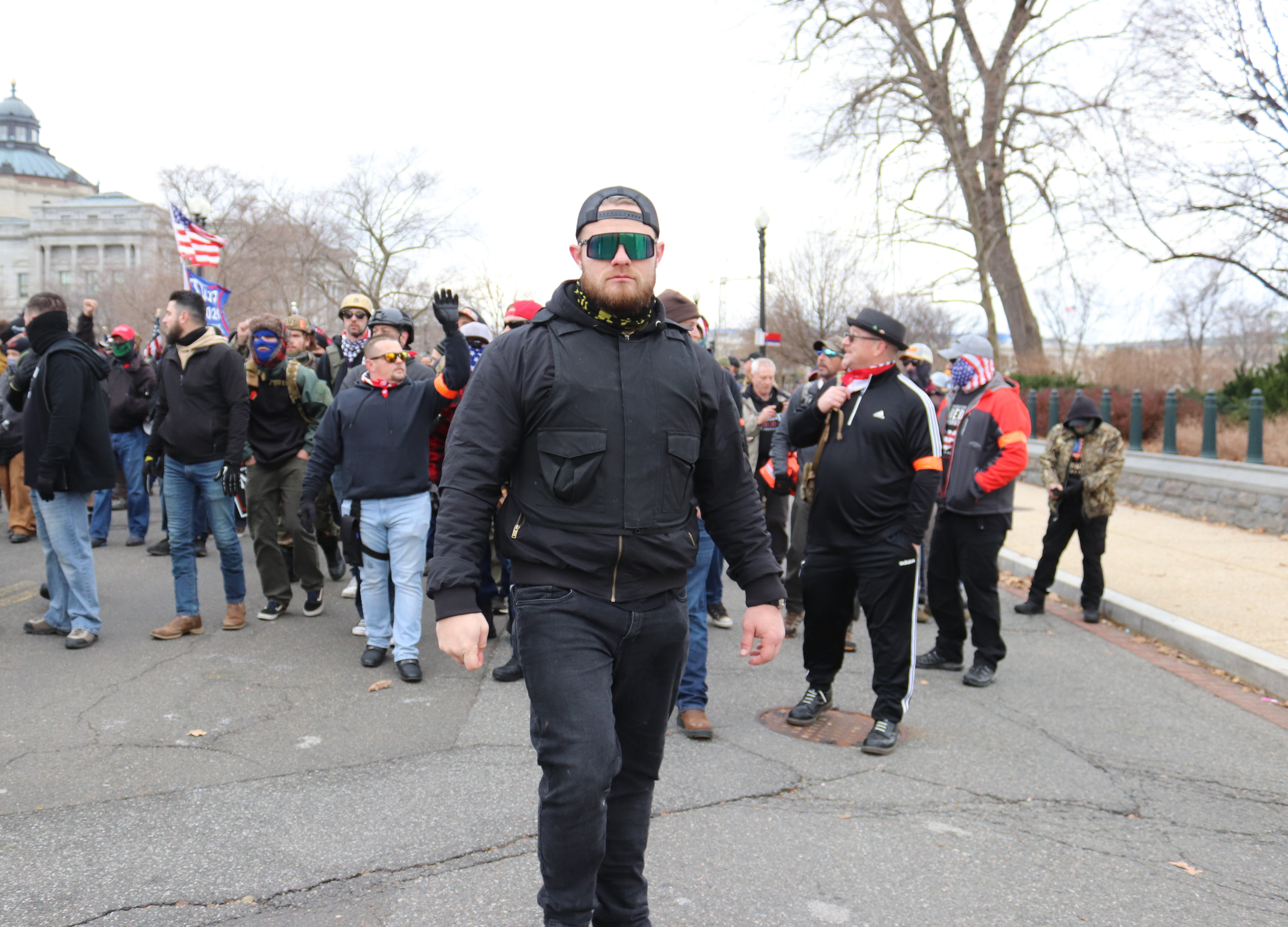
A pipe bomb (left), one of two found just blocks from the Capitol. Proud Boys leader Ethan Nordean (right) on January 6, leading a large crowd of Proud Boys to attack the Capitol.

After Donald Trump lost the 2020 United States presidential election, multiple individuals plotted to use force to stop the peaceful transition of power; this was one aspect of what eventually led to the January 6 attack on the United States Capitol.

Fourteen members of the Oath Keepers and Proud Boys militias were convicted of seditious conspiracy for planning and leading the attack, and a pipe bombing suspect was arrested in December 2025.

== Background ==
During the first 2020 presidential debate on September 29, 2020, in response to a question from moderator Chris Wallace, Trump addressed members of the Proud Boys militia, saying "Proud Boys, stand back and stand by, but I'll tell you what, I'll tell you what, somebody's got to do something about Antifa and the left, because this is not a right-wing problem." In response to the mention, the Proud Boys saw a large surge in membership, with one witness estimating membership tripled as a result.

In the days and weeks after his election loss, Donald Trump and his supporters undertook a variety of steps to prevent the transition of power, some legal and others illegal. On November 9, Trump fired Secretary of Defense Mark Esper and replaced him with Christopher C. Miller as acting Secretary. In response to the firing, Central Intelligence Agency (CIA) Director Gina Haspel privately told Chairman of the Joint Chiefs of Staff Mark Milley that "we are on the way to a right-wing coup". On December 18, Miller unilaterally terminated the Department of Defense's transition to the incoming administration, falsely claiming it was a mutually agreed pause for the holidays.

The January 6 attack was planned by the leaders of the Oath Keepers (red circles) and the leaders of the Proud Boys (red triangles), who travelled to D.C. from across the country.

In December, Trump pardoned multiple allies who would later participate in the D.C. rallies of January 5–6. On December 8, Trump pardoned retired U.S. Army General Michael Flynn who had pleaded guilty to "willfully and knowingly" making false statements to the Federal Bureau of Investigation (FBI) about communications with the Russian ambassador. Flynn, a prominent QAnon proponent, had been scheduled to be sentenced on December 18 where he faced up to six months imprisonment. He would later participate in the D.C. events on January 5, while his brother, U.S. Army General Charles Flynn, would participate in a conference call on January 6 denying permission to deploy the National Guard after the breach of the Capitol. On December 23, Trump pardoned Roger Stone, who had been found guilty at trial of witness tampering, making false statements to Congress, and obstruction; Stone was sentenced to 40 months in prison, but in July 2020, days before he was due to enter prison, Trump commuted his sentence. After the pardon, Stone recorded a video for Stop The Steal Security Project to raise funds "for the staging, the transportation and most importantly the security" of the event. Stone, who had longtime ties to both Proud Boys and Oath Keepers, employed Oath Keepers as security on January 5. Stone's Oath Keeper driver was later convicted of seditious conspiracy for his role in plotting and executing the following day's attack. On December 18, Trump called for supporters to travel to D.C., tweeting: "Big protest in D.C. on January 6th. Be there, will be wild!".

On January 3, all ten living former defense secretaries released an open letter in which they expressed concerns about a potential military coup to overturn the election results, mentioning the recently appointed acting secretary of defense Christopher Miller by name. That day, Trump ordered Miller to "do whatever was necessary to protect the demonstrators" on January 6. The next day, Miller signed a memo severely limiting the ability of the D.C. National Guard to deploy without his personal permission. Since his appointment in March 2018, D.C. National Guard Commanding Major General William J. Walker had standing orders to respond to civil disturbances in the District, but on January 5, Walker received new orders from Secretary of the Army Ryan McCarthy forbidding him to respond to a civil disturbance without explicit prior approval from McCarthy and Miller. Previously, he had authority to respond without first seeking permission. After the attack, Walker described the order as "unusual", noting "It required me to seek authorization from the Secretary of the Army and the Secretary of Defense to essentially protect my guardsmen".

On January 5, after Vice President Mike Pence refused to participate in the fake electors plot, Trump warned he would have to publicly criticize him. This prompted Pence's chief of staff to become concerned for the Pence's safety, leading him to alert Pence's Secret Service detail to the perceived threat. At 3:23 a.m. on the morning of January 6, QAnon leader Ron Watkins posted a tweet accusing Pence of orchestrating a coup against Trump and linked to a blog post which called for "the immediate arrest of [Pence], for treason."

== Planning of the attack ==
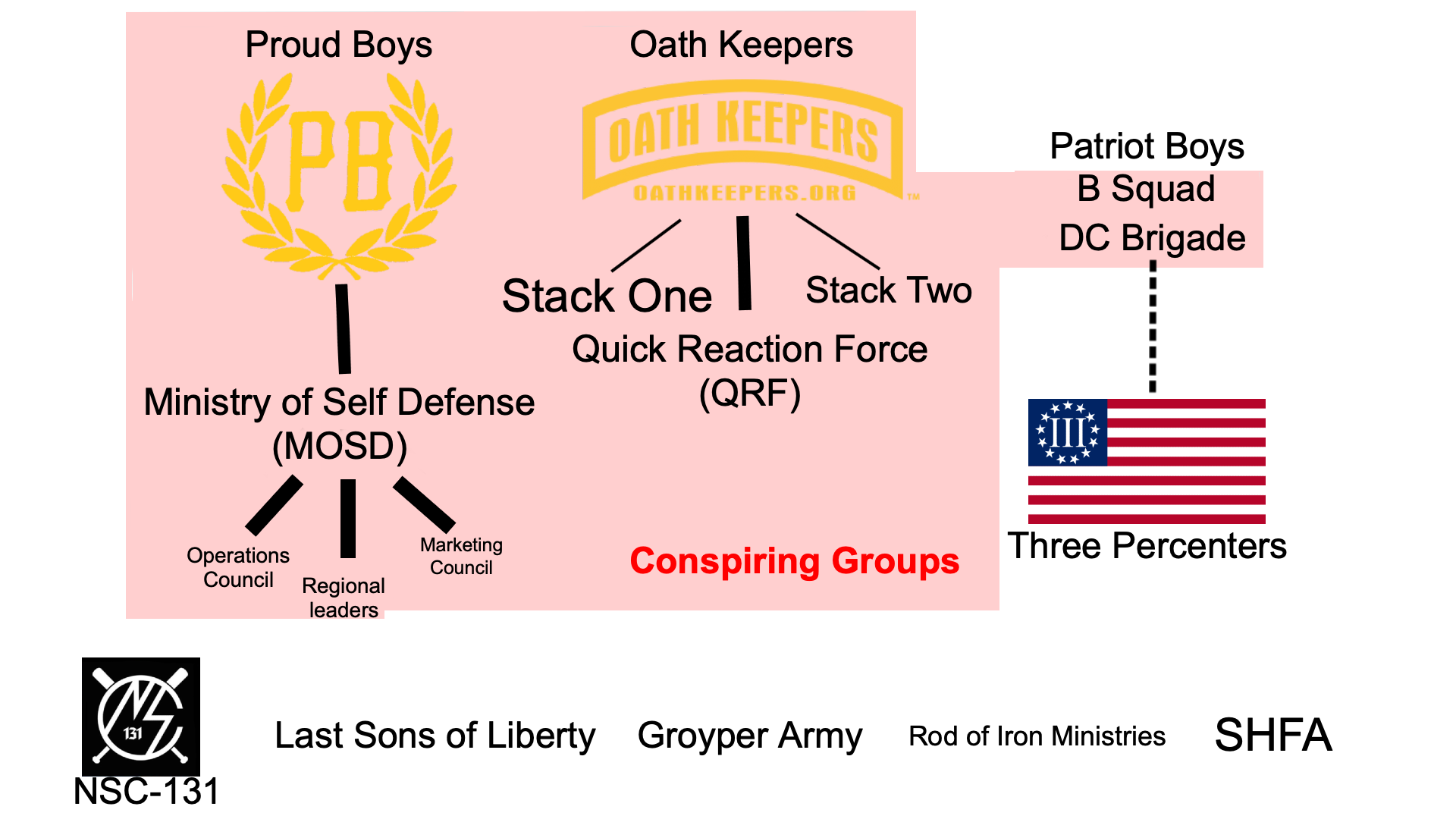
Militia groups that participated in the attack

The attack was carried out by a diverse coalition of Trump supporters including Oath Keepers, Proud Boys, Three-Percenter militia members, QAnon followers, and at least one bomber who remains unidentified. Leadership of both the Oath Keepers and the Proud Boys were later convicted of plotting a seditious conspiracy to use violence to interfere with the transfer of power. Prior to January 6, there was a noticeable increase of traffic from militia discussion forums to an obscure website about the Capitol complex's underground tunnel system, prompting the site's owner to alert the FBI.

Last Sons of Liberty, Rod of Iron Ministries, and Groyper Army were directly involved but non-conspiring groups. NSC-131 and Super Happy Fun America both were involved in the attack and allegedly conspired, though SHFA denies this. Multiple factions of the Three Percenters were also involved in the attack, including 'DC Brigade', 'Patriot Boys of North Texas', and 'B Squad'. The B Squad and DC Brigade conspired with the Proud Boys and Oath Keepers.

=== Pipe bomber ===
FBI compilation of bombs being placed

At 7:40 p.m. on January 5, someone wearing a gray hooded sweatshirt, a mask, and Nike Air Max Speed Turf sneakers was filmed carrying a bag through a residential D.C. neighborhood. At 7:52 p.m., the individual was recorded sitting on a bench outside the Democratic National Committee (DNC) headquarters where they appear to zip up a bag, stand and walk away. A pipe bomb was discovered there the following day. At 8:14 p.m., the unidentified individual was filmed in an alley near the Republican National Committee (RNC) headquarters, where a second pipe bomb was found the following day. Both bombs were placed within a few blocks of the Capitol. Both pipe bombs were fully functional and potentially deadly before being disabled by authorities. The bombs diverted law enforcement attention and resources away from the capitol building.

On December 4, 2025, the FBI announced they had arrested and charged a Woodbridge, Virginia man who they believed had placed the bombs.

=== Oath Keepers ===
Oath Keeper leaders who led a seditious conspiracy to stop the transfer of power: Stewart Rhodes (top), Kelly Meggs (2nd row, left) were convicted of seditious conspiracy in a November 2022 trial. Joseph Hackett (2nd row right) of Florida, Roberto Minuta of Texas (3rd row, left), David Moerschel of Florida (3rd row, right), and Edward Vallejo of Arizona (4th row left) were convicted of seditious conspiracy in a January 2023 trial. Three leaders pleaded guilty to seditious conspiracy in 2022: William Todd Wilson of North Carolina (4th row, right), Brian Ulrich of Georgia (bottom row, left), and Joshua James of Alabama (bottom row, right).

Oath Keepers leaders conspired to oppose the lawful transfer of presidential power by using force to prevent or delay the January 6 certification of the Electoral College. On November 5, 2020, two days after the presidential election, Oath Keeper leaders began using encrypted messages to communicate about a "civil war".

On November 7, after the election had been called as a win for Joe Biden, Rhodes joined a Roger Stone text chat group asking "What’s the plan?" On November 9, Oath Keeper leaders held an online members-only video conference in which leader Stewart Rhodes outlined a plan to stop transfer of power, including preparations for using force to accomplish the goal. The following day Rhodes appeared on the Alex Jones show where he called on Trump to invoke the Insurrection Act of 1807, and later warned that not doing so would lead to a "much more bloody war."

On December 14, the day the electoral college votes are cast, Rhodes published a letter advocating for the use of force to stop the transfer of power. On December 19, the leadership began communicating by photographs of cursive handwriting "to eliminate digital reads". On December 22, Rhodes gave an interview in which he urged Trump to use military force to stop the transfer of power and cited January 6 as the "hard constitutional deadline" to do so. On December 23, Rhodes announced plans to have "mission-critical gear stowed nearby just outside D.C." On December 26, Oath Keeper leaders attempted to arrange combat training from a private company. On December 31, an Oath Keeper leader discussed plans to have "a separate backpack with my ammo load out". Oath Keepers planned to store "an arsenal" with a "Quick Reaction Force" (QRF) in nearby Alexandria, Virginia. The leaders planned to procure boat transportation so that bridge closures could not prevent their entry into D.C.

On January 3, Rhodes departed his home in Texas, and spent $6,000 on a rifle and firearms equipment in Texas and an additional $4,500 in Mississippi, en route to D.C. On January 5, leaders began unloading weapons to the "QRF" in Alexandria. Leaders drove into D.C. on a "reconnaissance mission" before returning their hotel in Virginia. That night, Stewart Rhodes participated in an underground parking garage meeting with Proud Boys, including leader Enrique Tarrio.

On January 6, Oath Keepers clad in reinforced vests and tactical gear accompanied by a German Shepherd named "Warrior" marched to the capitol building in two tactical formations known as "stacks", where they participated and led the attack.

After January 6, Oath Keeper leadership continued to plot to use force to oppose the transfer of power. Four days after the attack, Rhodes attended a meeting where he was recorded saying "My only regret is that they should have brought rifles... We should have brought rifles. We could have fixed it right then and there. I'd hang fucking Pelosi from the lamppost." Over the following weeks, Rhodes spent over $17,500 on firearms and firearms equipment. On January 11, leaders contemplated retreating to the mountains of Kentucky and conducting a guerrilla war modeled after the North Vietnamese Army.

=== Proud Boys ===
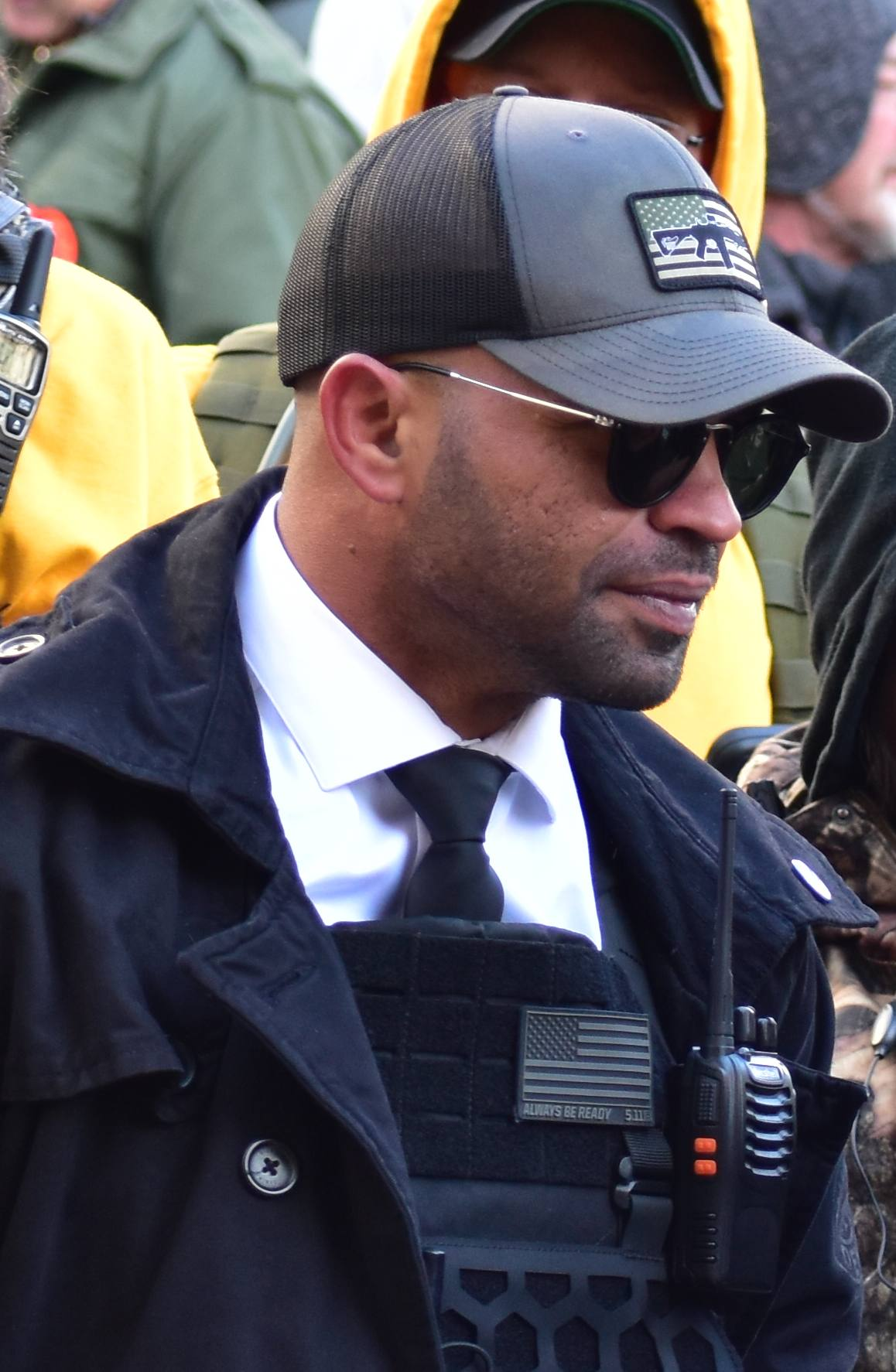
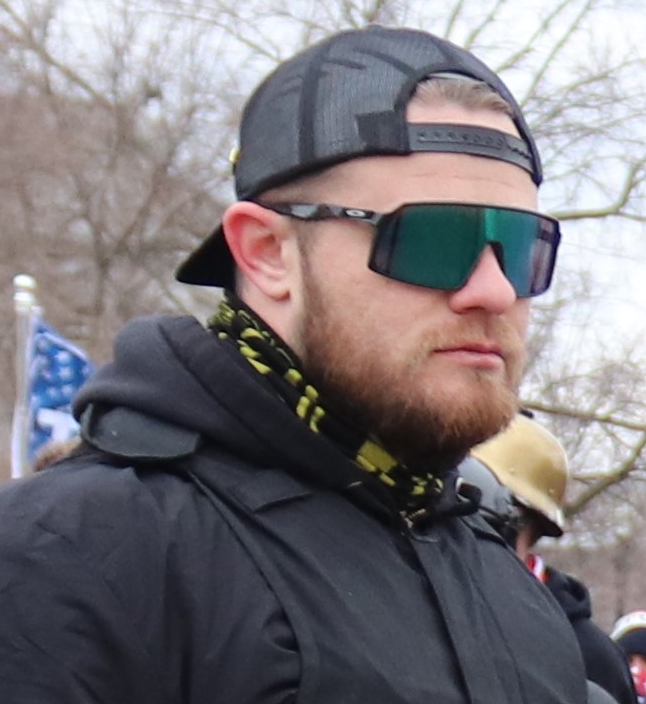
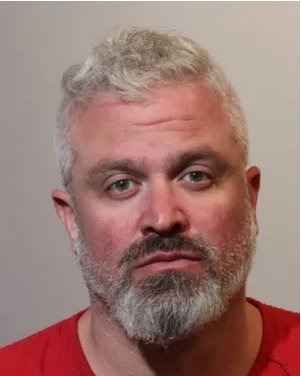
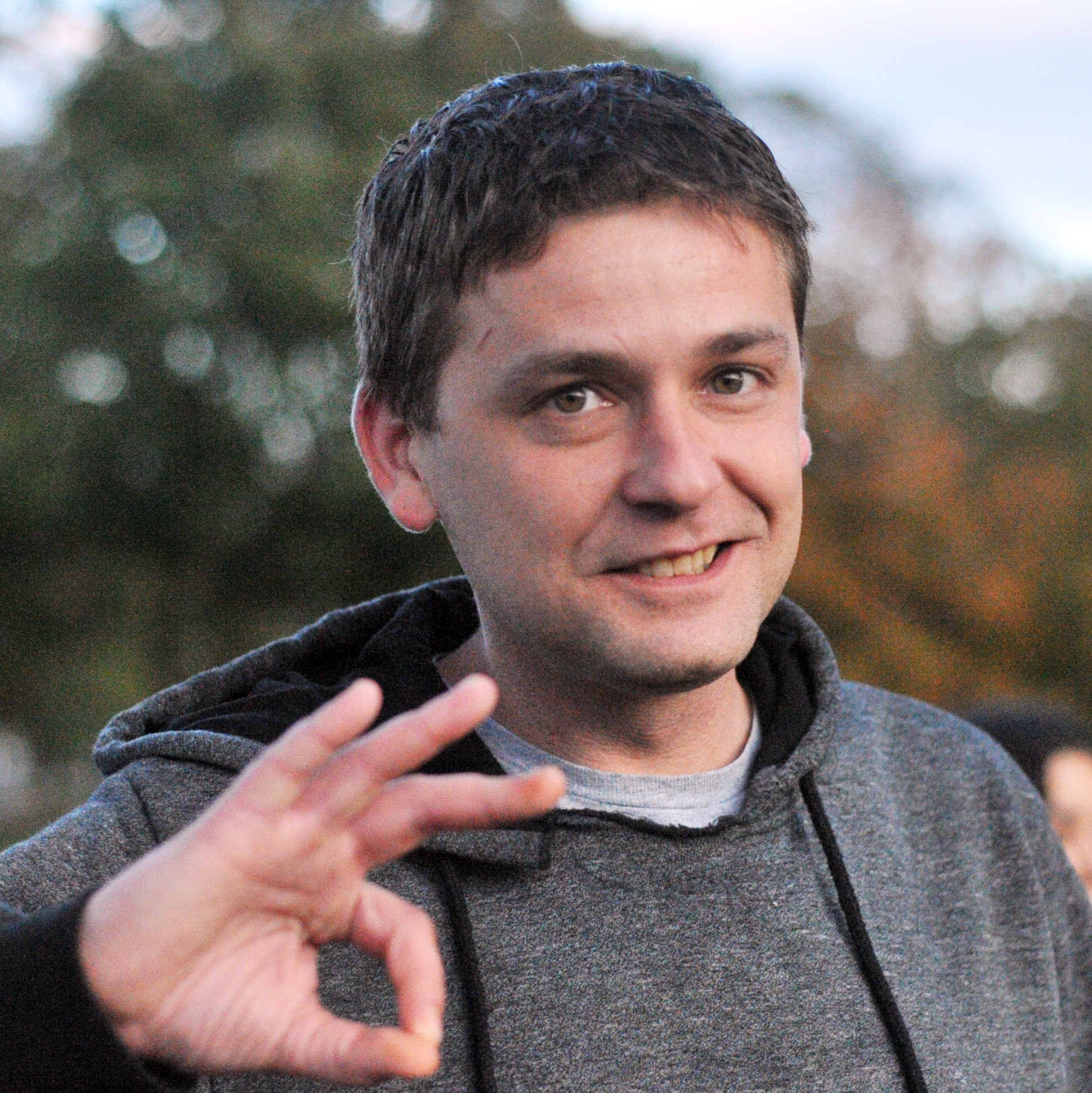
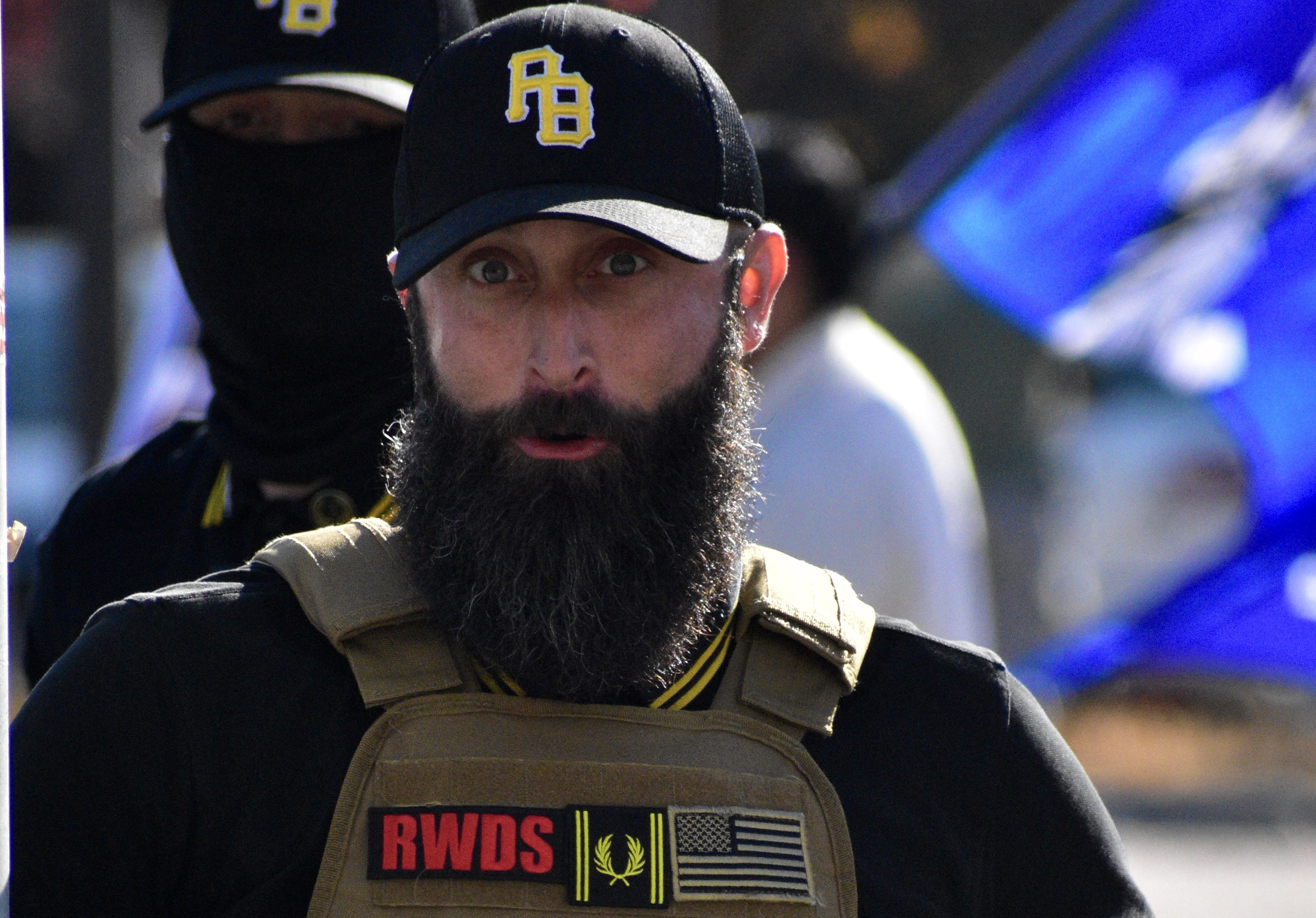
Proud Boys leaders who led a seditious conspiracy to stop the transfer of power: Chairman Enrique Tarrio of Florida (top left), Ethan "Rufio" Nordean of Washington State (top right), Joe Biggs (middle left) of Florida, Zachary Rehl of Pennsylvania (middle right) and Jeremy Bertino of South Carolina (bottom). Bertino pleaded guilty to seditious conspiracy, while the other four were found guilty of seditious conspiracy at trial.

The national leadership of the Proud Boys also conspired to stop, delay, or hinder the Electoral College certification. On December 20, the leadership formed a special handpicked group of Proud Boys leaders which communicated through an encrypted messaging group. That day, one leader posted a message saying, "I am assuming most of the protest will be at the capital building given what's going on inside."

The leadership began encouraging members to attend the January 6 event. Leaders used a crowdfunding website to raise money and purchase paramilitary equipment like concealed tactical vests and radio equipment in preparation for the attack. Using encrypted messaging, handheld radios, and other devices, the leadership used the days prior to, and the morning of, January 6 to plan the attack. On December 26, a leader of the Oath Keepers allegedly messaged instructions to "wait for the 6th when we are all in D.C. to insurrection". That leader also authored a message in December reporting, "I organized an alliance between Oath Keepers, Florida 3%ers, and Proud Boys". On December 29, leaders announced plans to be "incognito" on January 6, not wearing traditional black and yellow garb.

On December 30, the leadership received a document titled "1776 Returns" which called for the occupation of "crucial buildings" on January 6 and argued for supporters to "Storm the Winter Palace" in an apparent reference to an attack on the Capitol. The plan outlined by the document contains similarities to the actual attack on the Capitol on January 6. On January 3, Proud Boys leadership explicitly discussed attacking the Capitol, with one leader writing "what would they do [if] 1 million patriots stormed and took the capital [sic] building. Shoot into the crowd? I think not. They would do nothing because they can do nothing." That evening, leaders proposed focusing exclusively on the capitol building. The following morning, Proud Boy leader Enrique Tarrio replied "I didn't hear this voice [message] until now, you want to storm the capitol".

In late December, Tarrio formed the "Ministry of Self Defense" (MOSD), a secret elite unit within the Proud Boys, ordered not to interact with other members. The group initially consisted of Tarrio, Biggs, Nordean, and Bertino. Bertino was tasked with finding 9 recruits, which included Pezzola, Rehl, and Charles Donohoe. A legal representative for Rehl said that three recruits "had a common feature of aggression". Tarrio, Biggs and Nordean were part of the "Marketing Council", which declared that the main objective of the ministry was to stop the 2020 electoral certification. An "Operations Council" was created that included Rehl and two other members. Three other regional leaders were members and were not in any councils. The ministry created a general plan for the attack on encrypted group chats later obtained by the FBI.

On January 4, after allegedly being tipped off by a source within law enforcement, Tarrio notified other leaders that a warrant had been signed for his arrest in connection with having stolen and burned a Black Lives Matter banner. Tarrio was arrested by D.C. police, who discovered he was in possession of illegal high-capacity magazines, resulting in two felony counts. After his arrest, other leaders formed a new encrypted messaging group that did not include Tarrio, and reminded each other to delete incriminating messages from their phones. Amid speculation that "since he knew the cops were for him", Tarrio had likely logged out of the encrypted messaging service before being taken into custody, one leader opined "Well at least they won't get our boots on ground plans because we are one step ahead of them."

Tarrio was released on January 5 and ordered to leave the city. Rather than immediately comply, he traveled to an underground parking garage meeting with Oath Keepers leader Stewart Rhodes. That night, leaders divided members into teams, passed out radios, and programmed them to specific channels. Orders were issued at 8:27 p.m. to assemble at 10 a.m. at the Washington Monument. Leadership warned members to avoid police and not to drink in public. On January 6, about 100 plainclothes members assembled at the Washington Monument and were led to the Capitol to participate in the attack. Enroute, one member, Daniel "Milkshake" Scott, was recorded yelling "Let's take the fucking Capitol!", prompting another member to admonish "Let's not fucking yell that, alright?". Speaking into a megaphone, Nordean says "It was Milkshake, man... Idiot".

== Later events ==
Around 12:45 p.m., a woman using a shared alleyway to access her apartment building's laundry room discovered a bomb next to the Republican National Committee (RNC) offices. She alerted RNC security, which investigated and summoned law enforcement; U.S. Capitol Police, FBI agents and the Bureau of Alcohol, Tobacco, Firearms and Explosives (ATF) all responded to the RNC bomb. Law enforcement found a second explosive device outside the Democratic National Headquarters—both bombs were disabled before they could detonate. At 12:53 pm, Proud Boys near the Freedom Memorial breached a barricade on the outer perimeter, gaining entry to Capitol grounds. Shortly after his speech concluded at 1 pm, Donald Trump ordered his Secret Service detail to drive him to the Capitol—when they refused, Trump reportedly assaulted his Secret Service driver, lunging for the man's throat.

Surveillance video of Mike Pence being evacuated from the Capitol

At 2:10 pm, the Proud Boys breached the Capitol by breaking a window on the west terrace with a stolen police riotshield. As attackers began to climb the stairs toward the Senate chamber, a lone Capitol Police officer, Eugene Goodman, worked to slow the mob down as he radioed that they had reached the second floor. Realizing he was steps away from the still-unsealed Senate chamber doors, Goodman then shoved an attacker, leading the mob as he ran into a line of reinforcements. The Senate was gaveled into recess, and the doors were locked at 2:15. A minute later, the attackers reached the gallery outside the chamber. Pence came "dangerously close" to the attackers, as he was not evacuated from the Senate chambers until 14 minutes after the initial breach of the Capitol was reported. He and his family were eventually ushered from the Senate chambers into a second-floor hideaway. One minute later, the mob rushed onto a stair landing only 100 feet away, from which they could have seen him enter the room if they had arrived a minute earlier.

After his evacuation from the Senate chambers, Pence's Secret Service detail wanted to move him away from the Capitol building, but Pence refused to get in the car. Addressing the agent in charge of his detail Tim Giebels, Pence said "I trust you, Tim, but you’re not driving the car." In the face of Trump's inaction, Pence personally approved the deployment of the National Guard despite the fact that the vice president is not the commander-in-chief. At 4:17 p.m., Trump released a video telling attackers to "go home". Then-Acting Secretary of Defense Christopher Miller finally approved deployment of the National Guard at 4:32 p.m.

=== Prosecutions ===
On May 23, 2023, Oath Keeper founder Stewart Rhodes, age 57, was sentenced to 18 years in prison. The Department of Justice announced plans to appeal to the United States Court of Appeals for the District of Columbia Circuit for longer prison terms for Rhodes and his co-defendants. At sentencing, the Court described Rhodes as dangerous, noting "The moment you are released, whenever that may be, you will be ready to take up arms against your government." Eight of Rhodes's militiamen were convicted of seditious conspiracy among other charges. Kelly Meggs was sentenced to 12 years in prison. Jessica Watkins was sentenced to 8 years and six months and Kenneth Harrelson was sentenced to four years in prison. Both convicts were members of the Oath Keepers, with Watkins' crimes including merging her local Ohio armed group with the Oath Keepers in 2020, and Harrelson serving as the right-hand man to Kelly Meggs, leader of the Florida chapter.

On July 7, 2023, Barry Bennet Ramey was sentenced to 5 years in prison. He was connected to the Proud Boys and pepper-sprayed police in the face. Proud Boys leaders Joseph Biggs and Zachary Rehl were sentenced to 17 and 15 years respectively. Proud Boy Dominic Pezzola, who breached the capitol with a stolen police riot shield, was sentenced to 10 years on September 1st, 2023. On September 5th, 2023, Proud Boys leaders Enrique Tarrio was sentenced to 22 years in prison.
