= Criminal proceedings in the January 6 United States Capitol attack =

List of people charged with crimes

The investigation of the participants who attacked the U.S. Capitol building was the largest criminal probe in U.S. history. Over 5,000 FBI employees worked on the investigation. Four years after the attack, everyone who had been federally charged related to the riot received clemency from President Donald Trump.

On January 6, 2021, Trump supporters attacked the Capitol, disrupting the joint session of Congress assembled to count electoral votes to formalize Biden's victory in the 2020 United States presidential election.

By the end of 2021, 725 people had been charged with federal crimes. That number rose to 1,000 by the second anniversary of the attack, to 1,200 by the third anniversary (three-quarters of whom had by then been found guilty) and to 1,500 before the fourth anniversary. These federal cases were handled by the U.S. Attorney's Office for the District of Columbia (D.C.). State cases, of which there were fewer, were handled in the D.C. Superior Court.

Early on, the majority of charges filed against the rioters were for disorderly conduct and unlawful entry. Ultimately, about one-third of the defendants were charged with assault on or interference with law enforcement officers. Other charges included trespassing; disrupting Congress; theft or other property crimes; weapons offenses; making threats; and conspiracy, including seditious conspiracy.

On March 1, 2024, a federal appeals court forbid the use of a sentencing enhancement. This decision was expected to require the resentencing of over 100 rioters who had received it.

On June 28, 2024, in Fischer v. United States, the Supreme Court limited how the Justice Department could use the obstruction charge statute against the rioters. Hundreds of participants already charged with obstruction were expected to have the charge dismissed (though other charges would continue to apply).

Trump had been indicted in August 2023 for his actions related to the Capitol attack, but the indictment was dismissed after his November 2024 election to the presidency. Upon his inauguration on January 20, 2025, he pardoned the rioters, as he had repeatedly vowed to do during his campaign, erasing the convictions of all but 14 of about 1,270 people. The remaining 14 people, though their convictions stood, were eligible for immediate release from prison, as he commuted their sentences to "time served." The final indictment was dismissed by a judge on August 4, 2026 at the Justice Department's request.

The U.S. Department of Justice, in its role as prosecutor, moved on May 22, 2026, to dismiss the indictment. On August 4, Judge Amit P. Mehta ruled that, while he "strongly disagree[d]" with the government's opinion that "surrendering convictions for crimes against the country" served the public interest, he had no authority to deny the prosecutors' request. He dismissed the indictment, noting that the Oath Keepers' case had been "the last of the prosecutions seeking to hold accountable those responsible for the events of January 6."

== Personal life ==
On February 4, 2025, responding to a Justice Department order to identify which of its 38,000 employees had worked on these investigations, the FBI identified over 5,000 people by their employee IDs. The FBI Agents Association had filed a restraining order to attempt to prevent the release of information; after the FBI provided the employee IDs to the Department of Justice, it sued. On February 6, the corresponding employee names were provided by the FBI to the Department of Justice through a system for handling classified information. On July 17, U.S. District Judge Jia Cobb dismissed the lawsuit, saying the agents had not "plausibly allege[d]" that Trump would injure them. Brian Driscoll, a senior FBI official who had been acting director and had resisted turning over the agents' names, was forced out of the FBI in August.

== Criminal investigations ==
Days after the attack, D.C. Attorney General Karl Racine said he was looking at whether to charge Donald Trump Jr., Rudy Giuliani and Mo Brooks with inciting the attack on the Capitol and indicated that he might consider charging Donald Trump too once he left office. Others called for Trump to be prosecuted for inciting the crowd. D.C. Mayor Muriel Bowser said, "We saw an unprecedented attack on our American democracy incited by the United States president. He must be held accountable. His constant and divisive rhetoric led to the abhorrent actions we saw today."

On January 7, 2021, Michael R. Sherwin, the interim U.S. Attorney for the District of Columbia, said rioters could be charged with seditious conspiracy or insurrection. He further suggested that Trump could be investigated for comments he made to his supporters before they stormed the Capitol and that others who "assisted or facilitated or played some ancillary role" in the events could also be investigated. Former acting FBI director Andrew McCabe and inspector general David C. Williams stated Trump could face criminal charges for inciting the riot.

However, at first, according to The Washington Post,

"Capitol Police had for the most part let the rioters walk away. The task of identifying the thousands of attackers — let alone building cases against them — fell to a Justice Department whose leadership was in transition. William P. Barr had left his post as attorney general two weeks before the attack amid a growing rift with Trump. His successor, Jeffrey Rosen, held the office for less than a month, and Garland would not be sworn in until March 11. Biden’s pick to replace Sherwin as the U.S. attorney in D.C. would not take office for another 10 months."

Legal experts have stated that charging Trump with incitement would be difficult under Brandenburg v. Ohio (1969), the Supreme Court ruling which established that for speech to be considered criminally inciting, it must have been intended to incite "imminent lawless action" and "likely to incite or produce such action".

On January 7, 2021, Michael Sherwin, interim U.S attorney for the District of Columbia, expressed willingness to charge any Capitol Police officer found to have assisted the rioters.

On January 8, 2021, the Justice Department announced charges against 13 people in connection with the Capitol riot in federal district court, while more had been charged in the D.C. Superior Court. Three days later, the FBI and the Department of Justice were working to track down over 150 suspects. Acting Attorney General Jeffrey A. Rosen instructed federal prosecutors to send all cases back to D.C. for prosecution.

On January 12, 2021, Steven D'Antuono from the Federal Bureau of Investigation (FBI) announced the agency's expectation to arrest hundreds of people as it sorted through the vast amount of evidence submitted by the public. Charges of sedition and conspiracy were expected to be common. By the end of the month, the FBI had opened more than 400 case files and issued more than 500 subpoenas and search warrants related to the riot. The FBI also created a website to solicit tips from the public specifically related to the riot, and were especially assisted by the crowdsourced sleuthing group Sedition Hunters.

On February 10, 2021, CNN reported that the FBI, investigating the death of U.S. Capitol Police officer Brian Sicknick, was in the process of narrowing down a list of potential suspects. On February 26, the agency reportedly identified one suspect of focus, according to sources.

By March 11, 2021, when Merrick Garland was sworn in as U.S. Attorney General, investigators had identified 885 likely suspects and charged 278 rioters. At the time, Sherwin said "almost all" of the cases charged in federal court involved "significant federal felonies" with potential sentences between five and twenty years.

In March 2021, The New York Times reported that the FBI was investigating communications between an unnamed associate of the White House and an unnamed member of Proud Boys during the days prior to the incursion. The communications had been detected by examining cellphone metadata and were separate from previously known contacts between Roger Stone and Proud Boys.

In April 2021, dozens of defendants "deemed to be dangerous, flight risks or at high risk of obstructing justice were ordered held without bond. D.C. jail officials later determined that all Capitol detainees would be placed in so-called restrictive housing." Senator Elizabeth Warren criticized this decision, referring to it as solitary confinement, which she argued "is a form of punishment that is cruel and psychologically damaging."

On March 2, 2022, the congressional committee investigating the January 6 attack stated in a court filing that they had enough evidence for "a good-faith basis for concluding that the president and members of his campaign engaged in a criminal conspiracy". In December 2022, the committee recommended President Trump, John Eastman, and potentially others be charged with four types of criminal acts. The congressional committee cannot open criminal investigations, but the Justice Department began investigating Trump and his allies for criminal attempts to overturn the election in early 2021.

On November 18, 2022, Garland named Jack Smith as special counsel to investigate the January 6 attack and Trump's handling of government documents. In August 2023, Trump was indicted for his actions on and around January 6.

On November 25, 2024, Special Counsel Jack Smith filed to dismiss the charges against Trump, and his motion was approved. He had been reevaluating the charges after the Supreme Court ruled against many of them. In his dismissal request, he cited the Justice Department's internal policy not to prosecute a sitting president.

=== Investigations into alleged foreign involvement and payments ===
On December 8, 2020, French programmer Laurent Bachelier gave around US$500,000 ($620,000 in current dollar terms) in bitcoin payments to alt-right figures and groups. About half of these funds went to Nick Fuentes, the leader of the online Groyper Army, who denied breaching the building. The day after the transfer, Bachelier killed himself. As of January 2021, the FBI is investigating whether any of this money financed illegal acts.

As of January 2021, the FBI was also investigating whether foreign adversaries of the U.S. – governments, organizations or individuals – provided financial support to people who attacked the Capitol.

Separately, a joint threat assessment issued by the FBI, Department of Homeland Security, and other agencies said that "Russian, Iranian, and Chinese influence actors have seized the opportunity to amplify narratives in furtherance of their policy interest amid the presidential transition" and that these governments, through state actors, state media, and their proxies, used the riots to promote violence and extremism in the United States, denigrate American democracy, and in some instance promote conspiratorial claims.

== Evidence ==
In 2021, 14 media organizations calling themselves the Press Coalition sought trial records. Judge Beryl Howell issued a standing order for the Justice Department to preserve video exhibits in all Capitol riot cases. The online storage system is called USAfx. In February 2025, the Press Coalition noticed that all nine video exhibits in the case of Glen Mitchell Simon were missing.

== Numbers of people involved ==
In February 2021, federal officials estimated that about ten thousand rioters entered the Capitol grounds; in December, the Secret Service and FBI estimated that about 1,200 entered the building.

By October 2021, about 250 people were still wanted for assaulting police officers.

=== Charged ===
As early as February 2021, those charged included residents of 39 states and the District of Columbia. By January 6, 2022, one year after the attack, more than 725 people had been charged for their involvement; over the following year, the number increased to more than 950. A thousand people had been charged with federal crimes by the end of January 2023, two years after the attack, rising to more than 1,100 in August 2023. Three years after the attack, more than 1,200 had been charged. Almost 1,600 individuals have been charged for their participation in the event and nearly 260 have faced trials with two being acquitted.

Some criminal indictments are under seal.

=== Guilty findings ===
As of October 13, 2021, more than 100 defendants had entered guilty pleas. By July 2023, 629 defendants had pleaded guilty. Of the 129 others who went to trial, 87 were convicted of all charges, two were acquitted of all charges, and 40 received mixed verdicts (convicted of at least one charge, and acquitted or a hung jury on at least one charge). By August 2024, more than 1,400 people had been charged with federal crimes related to the attack and over 900 of them had been convicted.

As of the fourth anniversary of the attack, the Justice Department's efforts had led to 1,570 arrests, and the Justice Department was still trying to secure guilty pleas in about 300 cases.

=== Pardons and commutations ===
Upon Trump's inauguration on January 20, 2025, he granted "a full, complete and unconditional pardon" to everyone convicted of offenses related to the Capitol attack, who by then numbered over a thousand. The only exceptions were nine Oath Keepers (Elmer Stewart Rhodes, Kelly Meggs, Kenneth Harrelson, Thomas Caldwell, Jessica Watkins, Roberto Minuta, Edward Vallejo, David Moerschel and Joseph Hackett) and five Proud Boys (Ethan Nordean, Joseph Biggs, Zachary Rehl, Dominic Pezzola and Jeremy Bertino). These 14 people had their sentences commuted to "time served," allowing them to be released from prison immediately, but their convictions stood.

== Demographics ==
A week after the riot, over 50 public sector employees and elected officials and over a dozen Capitol police officers were facing internal investigations to determine their possible complicity.

According to a June 2022 estimate, about a third of defendants had ties to extremist or fringe movements, including the Proud Boys, Oath Keepers, Three Percenters, Patriot Front, Texas Freedom Force, Super Happy Fun America, Woodland Wild Dogs, and America First Bruins.

About a month after the riot, it seemed that most suspects were not affiliated with a specific far-right group and had been less formally radicalized by right-wing websites, social media, or television. At least 15% had ties to the military or law enforcement. About 40% were business owners or white-collar workers; only 9% were unemployed. A Washington Post review of public records showed that of defendants with enough information to identify financial histories, almost 60% had experienced financial problems over the preceding 20 years. Some 18% had a past bankruptcy (nearly double the rate of the general public), 20% had prior eviction and foreclosure proceedings, 25% had been sued by a creditor for not paying money owed; and others had bad debt, delinquent taxes, or tax liens. Many clearly expressed a belief in the QAnon conspiracy theory.

A couple months after the riot, over 300 people had been charged, including 25 women. Among those whose age was known, the average age was 41 years; the youngest charged was 18, and the oldest was 81. Those who were arrested came from 47 states, with the largest numbers coming from Texas, New York, California, Florida, and Pennsylvania. At least 27 had previous criminal records, with at least nine having been previously accused of, or convicted of, committing violence against women (including one who had served five years in prison for rape and sexual battery), or had been the subject of domestic violence restraining orders. 90% of those arrested were White Americans. Filipino Americans, Cuban Americans, and Vietnamese Americans were the largest non-White groups arrested in the attack.

By the end of February 2021, CNN was aware of "nearly a dozen" defendants who admitted that, to their knowledge, the other Capitol rioters were all Trump supporters and that the riot had not been (as Trump's lawyers and some congressional Republicans had claimed) a left-wing "false-flag" performance to pin blame on Trump supporters. On March 2, 2021, FBI Director Chris Wray testified before the Senate Judiciary Committee that there was no evidence that the rioters had been faking their support for Trump.

== Arguments raised by defendants ==
By the end of August 2021, according to CNN's tally, crowdfunding campaigns had raised over $2 million (~$2.34 million in 2025) (combined) for the legal defenses of dozens of defendants.

=== Inspired by Trump ===
In July 2023, Citizens for Responsibility and Ethics in Washington published an analysis showing that 174 defendants said they believed they were following Trump's request.

==== Examples ====
In the first few weeks, several defendants had already used the comments of President Trump in their legal defenses. One said, "I feel like I was basically following my president. I was following what we were called to do."

A month after the riot, an ABC News investigation found that, of about two hundred accused individuals facing federal charges, at least fifteen had claimed that they acted based on Trump's encouragement. A person who threatened to assassinate Representative Alexandria Ocasio-Cortez during the riot said: "I believed I was following the instructions of former President Trump. I also left Washington and started back to Texas immediately after President Trump asked us to go home." In February 2021, a lawyer for Jacob Angeli told CNN that Trump had inspired the attack using "Trump Talk" and propaganda. Angeli hung on Trump's every word as did millions of other Americans, the lawyer said, adding that Angeli's experience in police custody resembled being deprogrammed from a cult.

In January 2022, The New York Times reported that federal prosecutors were asking defense attorneys of indicted rioters if their clients would admit in sworn statements that they stormed the Capitol believing Trump wanted them to stop Pence from certifying the election. One member of Proud Boys who pleaded guilty said he had conspired with other members to "send a message to legislators and Vice President Pence." Another rioter stated in her guilty plea that she marched on the Capitol specifically after hearing Trump encourage Pence to "do the right thing." In April 2022, a defense lawyer for one of the rioters told jurors that Trump had been "using his position to authorize this assault."

Before their trials, Stewart Rhodes and several Oath Keeper defendants who participated in the ‘insurrection’ sought to use a "public authority" defense arguing that they should be immune from criminal liability because they relied on Trump's orders. Such a defense is also called "entrapment-by-estoppel". U.S. District Judge Amit Mehta, in ruling on pretrial motions, barred the defendants from raising such a defense, noting that Trump had no authority to call the defendants to action on January 6.

=== Aggravated by police or by leftists ===
The Justice Department said that James Little, who pleaded guilty to a misdemeanor, "blamed D.C. and Capitol Police for antagonizing the crowd, [and] blamed supporters of Antifa and Black Lives Matter for leading supporters of the former President to commit violence".

=== Ignorance ===
By February 2021, at least 39 criminal defendants claimed in court filings that they believed that they were free to enter the Capitol during the riot, as law enforcement officers did not attempt to stop them from entering and never told them they were not allowed to enter the building. No evidence has publicly emerged showing any officer inviting a rioter into the Capitol. United States Capitol Police chief J. Thomas Manger told CNN "this notion that the Capitol Police were somehow allowing these folks into the Capitol, inviting them in, helping them, [is] just simply not true".

Timothy Hale-Cusanelli (a New Jersey right-wing extremist who had previously dressed as Adolf Hitler) was the fifth January 6 defendant to go to a jury trial. He testified in his May 2022 trial that he was an "idiot" who had not known that Congress met at the Capitol, despite having also testified that he was a "history buff" who closely tracked the electoral college process. The jury convicted him on all counts, and after the verdict was rendered Judge Trevor N. McFadden said he would consider giving a sentencing enhancement to him because of the "highly dubious" nature of his testimony. At the September 2022 hearing in which he was sentenced to four years, McFadden said that Hale-Cusanelli had lied under oath, telling him, "You absolutely knew what you and others were doing."

=== Exempt from U.S. law ===
Taylor James Johnatakis said he accepted "full liability" for leading a crowd of rioters, but he did not plead guilty, instead advancing sovereign citizen arguments. A judge later sentenced him to more than seven years in prison, saying, "This cannot become normal".

=== Guilty ===
Of the nearly 1,600 people who were federally charged, over 1,000 pleaded guilty.

As one example, Pamela Hemphill pled guilty to demonstrating in a Capitol building. In May 2022, she was sentenced to 60 days in jail and 36 months' probation. In 2023, Trump publicly claimed her sentence was harsh. In response, she tweeted: "I pleaded guilty because I was guilty!" She told reporters: "It's a struggle trying to get away from gaslighting, Trump's narcissism and all the tactics they use... It was scary to leave the cult." She refused the pardon that Trump extended in January 2025 to nearly all Capitol rioters, and on June 3, 2025, she explained to CNN: "I’m not going to be a part of Trump’s lying narrative, and plus, you know, it’d be a slap [to] the Capitol police officers, the rule of law." The next day, Pence wrote to her, praising her "willingness to accept responsibility" and her "example of integrity and faith."

On October 16, 2023, William Chrestman, a Proud Boys member, pled guilty to obstructing a congressional proceeding and to threatening to assault a federal officer.

== Trump's presidential pardon of the rioters ==
Before Trump left office in January 2021, several rioters, including Jacob Angeli, reportedly hoped for presidential pardons. According to anonymous sources, during the two weeks following the attack and before he left office, Trump seriously considered a blanket pardon. It was deemed unfeasible because it would apply to a large, undefined group of people, many of whom had not yet been charged nor even identified. Concern was also expressed that White House counsel Pat Cipollone might quit if Trump were to attempt a blanket pardon.

On January 29, 2022, when over 760 people had been charged, Trump said at a Texas rally that he would be inclined to pardon the rioters if he were reelected in 2024.

Representative Adam Schiff, who served on the House committee that investigated the attack and was the lead manager during Trump's first impeachment trial, told MSNBC in February 2022 that Trump's offer of pardons suggested that he "condoned" the violence. Representative Pete Aguilar, who is also on the committee, told CNN the same day that he considered Trump's offer to be witness tampering.

Trump repeated his promise of pardons at a Tennessee rally in June 2022. In November, four days before the midterm elections, he said: "Let them all go now!" On May 10, 2023, he said he would be "inclined to pardon many of them" while hedging by saying "a couple of them, probably, they got out of control". On September 15, 2023, he said in an interview that aired two days later: "I'm going to look at them, and I certainly might [pardon them] if I think it's appropriate."

In January and March 2024, Trump referred to convicted rioters as "hostages". On July 31, 2024, Rachel Scott asked him if he would pardon "the rioters who assaulted police officers.” Trump responded: "Oh, absolutely I would. If they are innocent, I would pardon them." Scott said: "They’ve been convicted." Trump replied: "They were convicted by a very tough system."

On December 8, 2024, as president-elect, Trump said he'd pardon the rioters on his "first day" in office except for any he might deem to be "radical, crazy." Most people who were then still in prison for January 6 crimes had committed violence that day, whereas the nonviolent offenders "either never went to jail in the first place or had such short sentences that they are already out," as HuffPost concluded.

On January 12, 2025, Vice President-elect JD Vance told Fox News: "If you committed violence on that day, obviously you shouldn’t be pardoned, and there’s a little bit of a gray area there, but we’re very much committed to seeing the equal administration of law."

Upon assuming the presidency again on January 20, 2025, Trump followed through on his promise and issued a mass pardon for those convicted of the attack. No one would be required to spend any more time in prison, and all but 14 had their convictions erased. The reason for allowing those 14 convictions to stand was not immediately clear.

== Notable charges ==
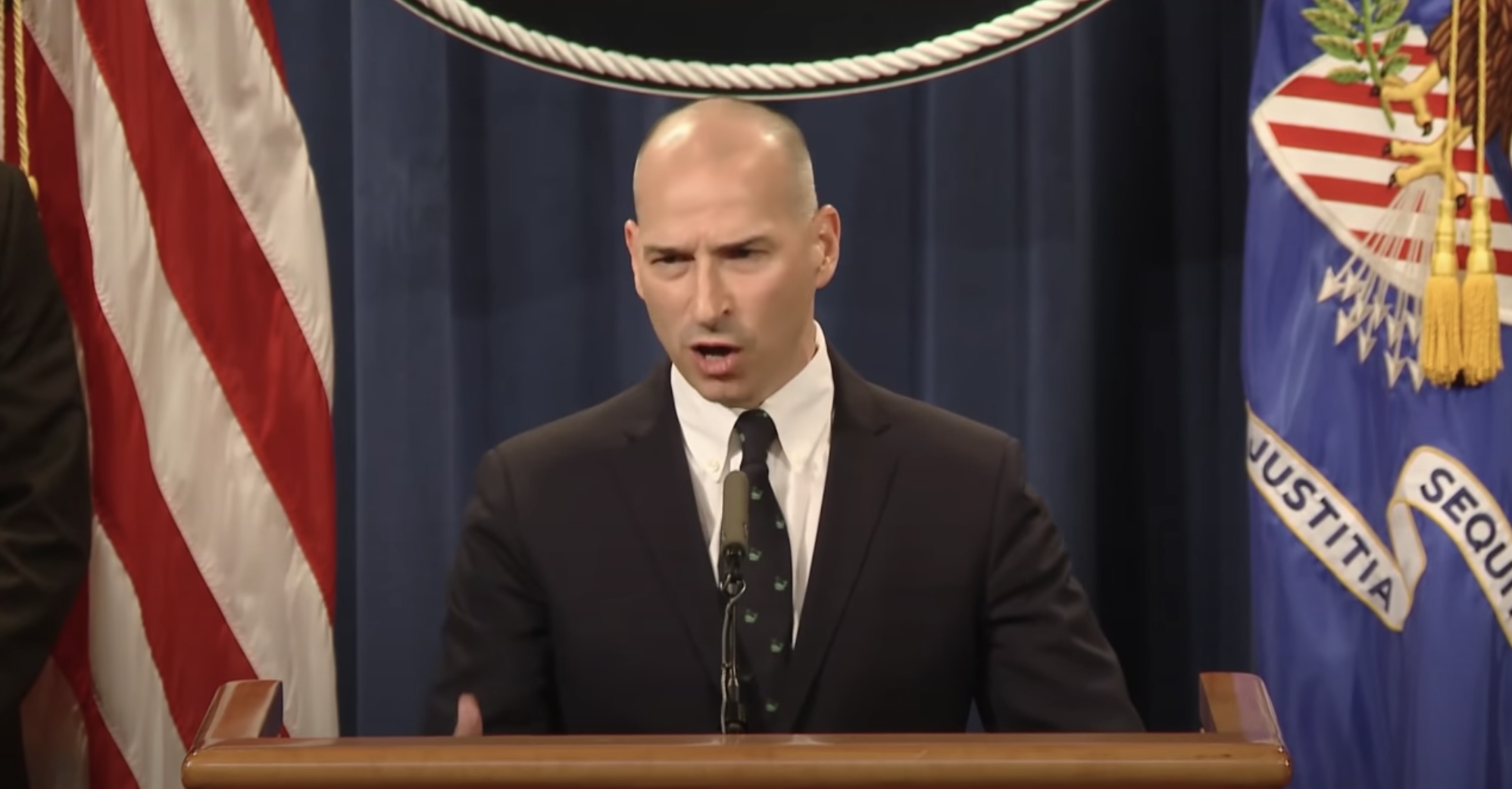
Interim United States Attorney Michael R. Sherwin holds a press conference on criminal charges related to the events at the Capitol.

=== Seditious conspiracy ===
On March 2, 2022, Oath Keeper Joshua James pleaded guilty to seditious conspiracy, admitting in his plea that "from November 2020 through January 2021, he conspired with other Oath Keeper members and affiliates to use force to prevent, hinder and delay the execution of the laws of the United States governing the transfer of presidential power." Stewart Rhodes and Kelly Meggs, also of the Oath Keepers, were found guilty of seditious conspiracy on November 29, 2022. Rhodes was sentenced to 18 years and Meggs to 12 years.

On June 6, 2022, five members of the Proud Boys—their leader Enrique Tarrio, together with Joseph Biggs, Zachary Rehl, Ethan Nordean and Dominic Pezzola—were indicted for seditious conspiracy. On May 4, 2023, all but Pezzola were convicted. A few months later, they were sentenced. Pezzola was sentenced on September 1, 2023.

In the mass pardons of January 20, 2025, Tarrio was pardoned, while Biggs, Rehl, Nordean, Rhodes, and Meggs had their sentences commuted to "time served".

List of Proud Boys and Oath Keepers members sentenced for seditious conspiracy
Defendant	Age	Affiliation	Residency	Plead	Recommended sentence	Prison sentence
Enrique Tarrio	38	Proud Boys	Miami, FL	Not guilty	33 years	22 years
Joseph Biggs	38	Proud Boys	Ormond Beach, FL	Not guilty	33 years	17 years
Zachary Rehl	36	Proud Boys	Philadelphia, PA	Not guilty	30 years	15 years
Ethan Nordean	31	Proud Boys	Auburn, WA	Not guilty	27 years	18 years
Stewart Rhodes	56	Oath Keepers	Granbury, TX	Not guilty	25 years	18 years
Kelly Meggs	54	Oath Keepers	Dunnellon, FL	Not guilty	21 years	12 years

=== Obstructing an official proceeding ===
In March 2022, U.S. District Judge Carl Nichols ruled that the charge of obstruction of an official proceeding (18 U.S.C. § 1512(c)) must be limited to alleged tampering with documents. However, in April 2023, an appellate court reversed this decision, so documents need not have been part of an alleged crime for a defendant to be charged with obstruction. By the time the Supreme Court said it would review the matter, over 150 Capitol rioters had been convicted of this charge or had pleaded guilty to it. On June 28, 2024, the Supreme Court decided in Fischer v. United States that an obstruction charge could be valid for someone who intended to stop the arrival of electoral certificates but not if they were simply trying to forcibly enter the Capitol building. On August 28, the case returned to federal district court, where Judge Nichols said Joseph Fischer's trial would begin in February 2025 on six charges including assaulting law enforcement officers and civil disorder.

Trump's case had already been delayed for months due to the Supreme Court agreeing to hear his claim of presidential immunity, Trump v. United States (2024), which it heard on April 25 and decided on July 1. Fischer v. United States, decided just three days before the immunity decision, may have contributed to additional delay.

The obstruction charge was one of the four charges against Donald Trump in the federal prosecution related to the 2020 election. Under the Supreme Court's clarification of when an obstruction charge is valid, this charge (along with the three others) continued to be brought against Trump until the entire case was dismissed in November 2024.

=== Other ===
Most defendants face "two class-B misdemeanor counts for demonstrating in the Capitol and disorderly conduct, and two class-A misdemeanor counts for being in a restricted building and disruptive activity", according to BuzzFeed, and therefore most plea deals address those misdemeanors. Some defendants have been additionally charged with felonies. A year after the attack, of the approximately 277 rioters sentenced to prison for January 6 crimes, the median sentence was 60 days; those who had committed crimes of violence generally received longer incarceration. Other punishments include home detention, fines, probation, and community service.

On January 9, 2024, Carlos Ayala, a Republican member of the Maryland State Board of Elections, was arrested. He was charged with civil disorder (a felony) as well as misdemeanors for allegedly sticking a pole with a “We the People” flag through a Senate wing window in the direction of officers inside. He resigned his job two days after his arrest.

On February 2, 2024, Ryan Samsel, James Grant, Stephen Randolph, Paul Johnson and Jason Blythe were convicted of felony civil disorder. During the riot, Samsel spoke with Joe Biggs and Ray Epps, knocked Capitol Police Officer Caroline Edwards unconscious, and instigated the breach of the Capitol.

In March 2024, Bloomberg reported that one of the January 6 participants, who was not named by Bloomberg, managed to avoid prosecution, and that this person was a Treasury Department employee. The article did not state whether or not this person being a federal employee had anything to do with them not being prosecuted.

In March 2024, John Banuelos was arrested. During the riot, he stood on a scaffold over the west plaza and fired a gun in the air. He was one of the few defendants charged with possessing a firearm, and the only defendant charged with firing one.

On July 30, 2024, an arrest warrant was issued for Tristan Sartor, and he was arrested at home the next day. During the riot, he had entered the Capitol building through the Senate Wing Door at 2:19 p.m. and stayed inside for a little over a minute, speaking to people holding “America First” flags. He was eventually identified because of his distinctive style of dress, especially a gold flower lapel pin, sunglasses and boots, that he showed off on social media.

On August 23, 2024, Justin Lee was found guilty of civil disorder and assaulting police. He had thrown a smoke bomb at Capitol police in a Capitol tunnel. After the riot, Lee became a Maryland police officer and worked for three months until he was arrested.

On September 12, 2024, brothers Phillip Walker and David Walker were charged with assaulting New York Times photojournalist Erin Schaff and stealing her camera.

== Notable sentences ==
The mass pardon of January 20, 2025, ended the federal prosecutions of the Capitol rioters. Prior to the pardon, the following sentences were given. These are a sample of the sentences given to over a thousand convicted people.

On March 8, 2022, the first criminal trial involving one of the rioters, Guy Reffitt, of Wylie, Texas, ended with a jury conviction. Reffitt was later sentenced to seven years and three months in federal prison. He had carried a holstered handgun, worn a helmet and body armor, and said he planned to drag House Speaker Nancy Pelosi from the Capitol by her ankles "with her head hitting every step on the way down".

On June 17, 2022, Couy Griffin, founder of Cowboys for Trump, was sentenced to 14 days in jail and one year of supervised release. He entered a restricted area of the Capitol. He appealed, arguing that he hadn't known Pence was inside. On October 22, 2024, the court upheld his conviction, writing that he had broken the law despite not knowing "[t]he basis of the Secret Service's authority to prevent access to designated areas for the safety of its protectees".

On August 11, 2022, Thomas Robertson, of Ferrum, Virginia, was also sentenced to seven years and three months in prison.

On August 26, 2022, Howard Richardson, of King of Prussia, Pennsylvania, was sentenced to three years and 10 months in prison followed by three years of supervised release. He had struck a police officer three times with a flagpole, hard enough to break the flagpole. He had been arrested in November 2021 and had pleaded guilty in April 2022.

On September 1, 2022, Thomas Webster, of White Plains, New York, was sentenced to 10 years in prison.

On September 22, 2022, Timothy Hale-Cusanelli, of Colts Neck, New Jersey, was sentenced to four years in prison.

On October 27, 2022, Albuquerque Cosper Head, of Kingsport, Tennessee, was sentenced to seven years and six months in prison. He had dragged Metropolitan Police Department officer Mike Fanone into the mob.

On December 5, 2022, Suzanne Ianni of Natick, Massachusetts, was sentenced to 15 days in prison for disorderly conduct. Ianni was formerly an elected member of the town meeting of Natick, Massachusetts, a member of Super Happy Fun America, and organizer of a Boston Straight Pride Parade.

On December 9, 2022, Ronald Sandlin, of Millington, Tennessee, was sentenced to more than five years and three months in prison. Sandlin followed the QAnon ideology. He and two other men had driven from Tennessee to Washington, DC in a rental car filled with weapons, and he had assaulted police officers. He had pled guilty.

On January 6, 2023, Jerod Wade Hughes, of East Helena, Montana, was sentenced to three years and 10 months in prison. As the eighth rioter to enter the Capitol, he climbed into the building through a broken window and helped kick open the Senate wing door so others could enter. He had pled guilty.

On January 27, 2023, Julian Khater, of Somerset, New Jersey, was sentenced to six years and eight months in prison. He used pepper spray to assault Capitol Police Officer Brian Sicknick, who died the next day after suffering strokes.

On February 9, 2023, Kevin Seefried, of Laurel, Delaware, was sentenced to three years in prison. He carried a Confederate flag through the Capitol and used the flagpole to fend off a police officer.

On March 14, 2023, Tristan Chandler Stevens, of Pensacola, Florida, was sentenced to five years in prison. He assaulted police officers while attempting to break into the Capitol.

On March 23, 2023, Riley June Williams, of Harrisburg, Pennsylvania, was sentenced to three years in prison. She stole the laptop of Nancy Pelosi with the intent on selling it to Russian foreign intelligence services and attempted to wipe all evidence of her crimes, after bragging about her involvement, in the days following the assault.

On April 11, 2023, Robert Sanford, a former firefighter from Chester, Pennsylvania, was sentenced to four years and four months in prison. He hit two police officers in the head with a fire extinguisher and threw a traffic cone at another officer.

On April 14, 2023, Vincent J. Gillespie, of Athol, Massachusetts, was sentenced to five years and eight months in prison. He grabbed a police shield from officers, rammed it into them and pulled another officer into the mob of protestors.

On April 14, 2023, Patrick McCaughey III, of Ridgefield, Connecticut, was sentenced to seven years and six months in prison. He crushed a police officer in a doorframe with a riot shield.

On April 28, 2023, Jeffrey Scott Brown, of Santa Ana, California, was sentenced to four years and six months in prison. He assaulted police with pepper spray.

On May 5, 2023, Peter Schwartz, of Uniontown, Pennsylvania, was sentenced to 14 years and two months in prison. He sprayed a "super soaker" canister of pepper spray at retreating officers. He had 38 prior convictions over the previous 30 years.

On May 24, 2023, Richard Barnett, of Gravette, Arkansas, was sentenced to four years and six months in prison. He had carried a stun gun into House Speaker Nancy Pelosi's office, propped his foot up on a desk, and bragged about stealing an envelope from the office.

On May 25, 2023, Stewart Rhodes, of Garland, Texas, was sentenced to 18 years in prison. He was charged with seditious conspiracy, receiving an increased sentence due to his actions being ruled as terrorism by U.S. District Judge, Amit Mehta. Rhodes was the founder of the Oath Keepers, a far-right extremist militia, and was the first to be convicted of seditious conspiracy and terrorism in relation to the attack.

On May 25, 2023, Kelly Meggs, of Dunnellon, Florida, was sentenced to 12 years in prison. A leader of the Oath Keepers' Florida chapter, Meggs was charged with seditious conspiracy for his role during the attack.

On May 26, 2023, Jessica Watkins, of Woodstock, Ohio, was sentenced to eight years and six months and Kenneth Harrelson was sentenced to four years in prison. Both convicts were members of the Oath Keepers, with Watkins' crimes including merging her local Ohio armed group with the Oath Keepers in 2020, and Harrelson serving as the right-hand man to Kelly Meggs, leader of the Florida chapter.

On June 21, 2023, Daniel Rodriguez, of Fontana, California, was sentenced to 12 years and seven months.

On July 7, 2023, Barry Bennet Ramey, of Plantation, Florida, was sentenced to five years in prison. He was connected to the Proud Boys and pepper-sprayed police in the face.

On July 13, 2023, Kyle Fitzsimons, of Lebanon, Maine, was sentenced to seven years and three months in prison. He attacked Capitol Police Sgt. Aquilino Gonell and D.C. Police Sgt. Phuson Nguyen. While in the mob, Fitzsimons was hit by another rioter and received a bloody head wound that later required staples.

On July 14, 2023, Audrey Ann Southard-Rumsey, of Spring Hill, Florida, was sentenced to six years in prison. Brandishing a flagpole, she knocked over a police officer.

On July 24, 2023, Peter Stager, of Conway, Arkansas, was sentenced to four years and four months in prison. He beat a police officer, Blake Miller, with a flagpole.

On July 28, 2023, Thomas Sibick, of Buffalo, New York, was sentenced to four years and two months in prison. He stole Metropolitan Police Officer Michael Fanone's badge and radio.

On August 17, 2023, Michael Steven Perkins, of Plant City, Florida, was sentenced to four years in prison. He attacked officers with a flagpole. His co-defendant, Joshua Christopher Doolin, was sentenced to one year and six months.

On August 31, 2023, Joseph Biggs, of Ormond Beach, Florida, was sentenced to seventeen years in prison and Zachary Rehl was sentenced to fifteen years for seditious conspiracy and other charges.

On September 1, 2023, Dominic Pezzola, of Rochester, New York, was sentenced to ten years in prison for various charges relating to smashing a window in the U.S. Capitol.

On September 5, 2023, former Proud Boys leader Enrique Tarrio, of Miami, Florida, was sentenced to 22 years for his role in organizing the attack. This is the longest sentence associated with the attack delivered to date.

On September 22, 2023, Jonathan Munafo, of Albany, New York, was sentenced to 33 months followed by 36 months of supervised release. He punched a police officer, stole the officer's riot shield, and struck a Capitol office window with two poles. He pleaded guilty.

On October 17, 2023, Ryan Kelley, of Allendale, Michigan, who in 2022 had been a leading Republican candidate for Michigan governor, was sentenced to 60 days in jail. He shouted "This is war, baby!" while encouraging rioters.

On October 17, 2023, Rachel Powell, of Mercer County, Pennsylvania, a former Californian and a mother of eight, was sentenced to 57 months in prison and 36 months of supervised release. She had carried an axe and a wooden pole. The Justice Department describes her as "one of the first rioters to break through onto Capitol grounds near the Peace Circle."

On November 3, 2023, Federico Klein, of Falls Church, Virginia, a former State Department appointee of Trump, was sentenced to five years and 10 months in prison. He was convicted on eight counts, including for assaulting multiple police officers.

On November 29, 2023, Nathan Pelham, of Greenville, Texas, was sentenced to 24 months. Initially charged with four misdemeanor counts for entering the Capitol, he had agreed to surrender. On the scheduled day for his surrender, his father called police to say that his son was suicidal, and when police arrived at his home for a welfare check, he shot at them.

On November 29, 2023, Matthew Huttle, of Hobart, Indiana, was sentenced to six months in federal prison alongside a year of supervised release. His 73-year-old uncle Dale was also sentenced to 30 months plus probation in June of the following year, and was the one who struck two officers with a pole of a large American flag. Shortly after his return to Indiana on January 26, 2025, Huttle was shot and killed by Indiana State Police troopers during a traffic stop near Rensselaer after attempting to pullout a gun in front of officers.

On December 7, 2023, Alan Hostetter, of San Clemente, California, was sentenced to 11 years and 3 months. Hostetter is a former California police chief who gave speeches calling for others' execution the day before the Capitol attack and then brought a hatchet and tactical gear to the Capitol.

On December 15, 2023, Anthony Sargent, a Proud Boy from St. Augustine, Florida, was sentenced to five years in prison. He threw a rock at the Capitol doors.

On January 9, 2024, Ray Epps, a former Arizonian from Utah, was sentenced to probation. He had been arrested the previous September and had been charged with disorderly and disruptive conduct. He told the judge that he realizes that the election was not stolen, that he knows that Trump supporters carried out the attack, and that he feels remorse for his participation. After the riot, Epps became the center of conspiracy theories; he is suing Fox News and Tucker Carlson for defamation.

On January 24, 2024, Marc Bru, of Vancouver, Washington, was sentenced to six years. He marched with the Proud Boys, shoved a barricade against a police officer, and spent about 13 minutes inside the Capitol, entering the Senate gallery. Just before being sentenced, he called the judge a "clown" and said: "I’d do it all over again."

On February 29, 2024, Brandon Fellows, of Schenectady, New York, was sentenced to 3½ years. He had smoked marijuana in a senator’s office. Six months before his sentencing for his offenses on January 6, while his trial was ongoing, the judge had also sentenced him to five months for criminal contempt of court related to his misbehavior in the courtroom.

On April 3, 2024, Taylor James Johnatakis, of Kingston, Washington, was sentenced to over seven years. He assaulted a police officer and told the court that the attention given to the riot was "overblown".

On May 17, 2024, Leo Brent Bozell IV, of Palmyra, Pennsylvania, was sentenced to 45 months. Prosecutors had requested a terrorism enhancement, but the judge rejected it. Bozell led a mob through police lines, smashed the Capitol's windows and opened its doors from inside, raided Pelosi's office, and moved a security camera. He is the son of Leo Brent Bozell III, a conservative writer.

On August 9, 2024, David Nicholas Dempsey, of Van Nuys, California, was sentenced to 20 years. He had attacked police with flagpoles and pepper spray and stomped on their heads.

On August 27, 2024, Michael Sparks, of Elizabethtown, Kentucky, was sentenced to 53 months plus 36 months of supervised release and fined $2,000. He was the first rioter to enter the Capitol, having climbed through the window Dominic Pezzola broke, and he chased Capitol Police officer Eugene Goodman upstairs.

On October 17, 2024, Dana Jean Bell, of Princeton, Texas, was sentenced to 17 months. Authorities say that she was considered to be a particularly disruptive rioter who engaged in "prolonged, abusive, and violent" attacks on law enforcement officers, including one that ultimately took his own life following injuries caused by the insurrection.

On October 28, 2024, former Bob's Burgers voice actor Jay Johnston, of Chicago, Illinois, was sentenced to 366 days plus 40 hours of community service and pay $2,000 in restitution.

On October 31, 2024, Patrick Montgomery, of Littleton, Colorado, was sentenced to 37 months as well as three years of supervised probation. Authorities say that he wrestled an officer before kicking him in the chest.

On November 4, 2024, Cameron Clapp, a Cambria, California triple amputee, was sentenced to probation. In one video obtained by FBI investigators, Clapp can allegedly be heard saying, "I made it in but there's... nobody's in, like everyone's leaving so... I did my part. I'm... satisfied." Court documents show Clapp pleaded guilty to disorderly conduct in a capitol building and parading, demonstrating or picketing in a capitol building.

On November 20, 2024, Robert Giacchetti, of Crystal Lake, Illinois, pleaded guilty to a single count of assaulting, resisting, or impeding certain officers. Authorities say that he entered the Capitol and continued to chant through a bullhorn. He moved through the Rotunda and Gallery Stairs, chanting “Treason!” and “1776,” according to prosecutors.

== Related activities and proceedings ==
The day after the attack, the FBI and D.C.'s Metropolitan Police Department asked the public for help identifying the rioters. Within three weeks, the FBI had received more than 200,000 digital media tips from the public. At least one person was harassed after being incorrectly identified as a participant in the riots by members of the public. His personal information had been doxed, and he reported receiving harassing phone calls and posts on social media.

On January 12, 2021, Adam Newbold, a retired Navy SEAL and the director of firearms training business ATG Worldwide, was questioned by the FBI. On January 6, 2021, he posted a video on the ATG Facebook page in which he described "breaching the Capitol", and on January 12 he shared a second video message in which he described having participated in a "caravan" to the Capitol on January 6 because he was "angry at the direction of our country." He has expressed regret for his participation and said he is cooperating with the FBI.

On April 28, 2021, Brendan Hunt, was convicted of making a death threat against unspecific congresspeople and senators, in a video blog around the time of the Capitol riots. Although Hunt was not in Washington on January 6, federal prosecutors cited the Capitol riots as relevant context that made such a threat more dangerous.

On October 15, 2021, U.S. Capitol Police Officer Michael A. Riley was arrested and charged with obstruction of justice for advising Jacob Hiles to remove incriminating posts from social media. In September 2021, Hiles pleaded guilty to unlawfully protesting in the Capitol. The Capitol Police disclosed that they had known of the investigation into Riley's actions for several weeks, placed him on administrative suspension upon his arrest, and announced an internal affairs investigation into his actions. On October 28, 2022, a jury found Riley guilty of one count of obstruction of justice but was unable to reach a decision on a second charge.

On March 2, 2022, federal prosecutors presented their opening statements in a criminal trial against Guy Wesley Reffitt. Many other defendants were charged with obstruction related to the disruption of the Electoral College vote certification, but Reffitt's trial was "the first time a jury will get to decide whether the charge fits the crime", according to the New York Times. On March 8, 2022, he was found guilty on all five counts: transporting a firearm in furtherance of a civil disorder; obstruction of an official proceeding; entering or remaining in a restricted area or grounds with a firearm; obstructing officers during a civil disorder; and obstruction of justice – hindering communication through force or threat of physical force. Prosecutors sought a 15-year prison sentence, by far the longest among the over 200 other convicted rioters at that time. On August 1, 2022, he was sentenced to 7 years.

On March 23, 2022, Capitol riot suspect Evan Neumann was granted asylum in Belarus "indefinitely". Neumann claimed that he faced "political persecution" in the United States.

On March 9, 2023, Politico reported that an email showed that an agent from the Justice Department had given an order to "destroy 338 items of evidence." The same Politico article also said, "Some of the messages appeared to reveal that FBI agents accessed contacts between defendant Zachary Rehl and his attorney."

In October 2023, Representative Kevin McCarthy was ousted from his role as Speaker of the House, and Representative Mike Johnson was chosen to replace him. On November 17, Johnson announced that Republicans would release the surveillance footage of the attack on the Capitol (previously available upon request to defendants and journalists) to the public. He claimed that doing so would allow people "to see for themselves what happened that day" and to reconsider the government's "interpretation". However, he said that some faces would be blurred to prevent those people “from being targeted for retaliation of any kind”, and that some footage would not be released due to security concerns "related to the building architecture”. On December 5, he reaffirmed at a press conference: "We have to blur some of the faces of persons who participated in the events of that day because we don’t want them to be retaliated against and to be charged by the DOJ."

By 2023, after several hundred participants had been jailed, tried and convicted for their activities, some House Republicans such as Marjorie Taylor Greene sought to characterize them as "political prisoners." Trump and House Republican Conference chair Elise Stefanik characterized them as "hostages." Reagan-appointed federal judge Royce Lamberth, who had presided over dozens of the cases, remarked in a January 2024 court filing, in part:

I have been shocked to watch some public figures try to rewrite history, claiming rioters behaved "in an orderly fashion" like ordinary tourists, or martyrizing convicted January 6 defendants as "political prisoners" or even, incredibly, "hostages." That is all preposterous. But the Court fears that such destructive, misguided rhetoric could presage further danger to our country.

First Class Label Group and Vote Your Vision scheduled a fundraiser for the rioters called the “J6 Awards Gala”. It was to be held at Trump's Bedminster, New Jersey country club, and Trump was invited, though it was not known if he planned to attend. One day in advance of the September 5, 2024 event, the event website announced that it was postponed.

== See also ==
- Attempts to overturn the 2020 United States presidential election
- Canada convoy protests, whose events have been inspired by the U.S. Capitol attack
- Justice for J6 rally
- Public hearings of the United States House Select Committee on the January 6 Attack
- 2023 invasion of the Brazilian Congress, whose events have been likened to the U.S. Capitol attack
