= Jessica Marie Watkins =

American Capitol rioter

Jessica Watkins
- Born: 1982 or 1983
- Occupations: US Army, bar owner
- Organization: Oath Keepers
- Known for: Participation in the January 6 United States Capitol attack

Jessica Marie Watkins (born 1982 or 1983) is a transgender American militia founder and former Oath Keeper leader, Army veteran and bar owner who took part in the January 6 United States Capitol attack. She was convicted of multiple felonies relating to her participation and in May 2023 was sentenced to 8.5 years in federal prison. On January 20, 2025, President Donald Trump commuted her sentence to "time served". On August 4, 2026, the DC District Court dismissed her felony charges with prejudice.

== Early life and career ==
Watkins was raised in Ohio and upstate New York. She enlisted in the U.S. Army in 2001 following her high school graduation, completing a Ranger course and then serving in Afghanistan until 2003 when she left the military. She went absent without leave from the Army when her transgender identity was revealed, moving to Alaska due to non-acceptance of her identity by her family.

She later worked as a first responder in Fayetteville, North Carolina. By 2019, she was the co-owner of the Jolly Rogers Bar and Grill, a pirate-themed bar in Woodstock, Ohio with her fiancé. That year, she also set up the Ohio State Regular Militia for aid work after tornadoes cut off electricity to tens of thousands of residents. Business declined at the bar in 2020 due to the COVID-19 pandemic. Following the murder of George Floyd, she led her militia as self-appointed security guards during the resulting protests in Ohio and Kentucky. On November 7, 2020, when Joe Biden was declared winner of the 2020 U.S. presidential election, she appeared on the front lawn of the Ohio Statehouse with two other militia members, between two rival protest groups.

== January 6 United States Capitol attack ==
In 2021, Watkins attended the January 6 Capitol attack with her militia, coordinating with the Oath Keepers of which she was also a leader, and wearing military armour and tactical military style clothing. At the U.S. Capitol building, members of the militia encouraged rioters to forcibly enter the building. In 2021, while facing criminal trial, she disavowed the Oath Keepers.

Watkins went on trial with codefendants Kelly Meggs and Stewart Rhodes. In 2022, Watkins was the only one of the three acquitted of seditious conspiracy but was found guilty of conspiracy to obstruct an official proceeding and interfering with police. While in jail, she became a close friend of fellow Capitol rioter Guy Reffitt through playing the card game Magic: The Gathering, and became convinced of the false belief that the riot itself was "a setup" conducted by U.S. law enforcement.

In May 2023, U.S. District Judge Amit Mehta sentenced Watkins to 8.5 years in prison, criticizing her initial lack of remorse, but acknowledging a more recent apology. A cited justification for her long sentence compared to other rioters was her role in recruiting at least three other rioters.

On January 20, 2025, President Donald Trump commuted the sentence of Watkins to "time served". She was one of fourteen individuals to have their sentence commuted; all others convicted of crimes related to the January 6th attack were unconditionally pardoned.

On May 21, 2026, the U.S. Court of Appeals for the D.C. Circuit issued a unanimous 3–0 per curiam order to vacate Watkins’ remaining convictions and remanded the case to the district court, enabling the Department of Justice to dismiss the indictments with prejudice.

On August 4, 2026, Judge Amit Mehta delivered his ruling and order officially granting the government's motion to dismiss with prejudice. As a result, Watkins along with eight other January 6 defendants charged on seditious conspiracy and other felony charges were all dropped, thus permanently ending her prosecutions relating to the January 6 Capitol attack.

== Personal life ==
Watkins was born in 1982 or 1983 under a different name, taking the name Jessica Marie Watkins in 2003 or 2004. Watkins is a trans woman and spoke at her trial about her struggle with her gender identity was a factor that led her towards paranoia, fear and conspiracy theories.

She lived in Rochester, New York, and in Fayetteville, North Carolina, before moving to Woodstock, Ohio.

== See also ==
- List of cases of the January 6 United States Capitol attack (T-Z)
- Criminal proceedings in the January 6 United States Capitol attack
- List of people granted executive clemency in the second Trump presidency
