= Evan Neumann =

Californian software developer and US emigrant

- Born: June 22, 1972 (age 54); Santa Rosa, California, U.S.
- Occupation: Software developer
- Known for: Emigrating to Belarus

Evan Neumann (born June 22, 1972) is an American software developer and former fugitive who left the US following his alleged activities during the 2021 United States Capitol attack and was granted permanent refugee status in Belarus.

Fearing extradition by the Ukrainian authorities, he fled Ukraine for Belarus where he sought and obtained political asylum. Belarus does not have an extradition treaty with the US.

On January 20, 2025, the first day of the second presidency of Donald Trump, Neumann received a federal pardon along with nearly every other participant in the Capitol attack as part of Trump's pardon of January 6 United States Capitol attack defendants, dropping all charges against him.

== Early life ==
Neumann was born on June 22, 1972, to father Claus Neumann, a Santa Rosa hotelier who owned the Los Robles Lodge and Hotel La Rose.

== Personal life and career ==
Neumann lived in Mill Valley before leaving for a Europe trip. He works as a freelance software developer.

He has been granted two patents from the USPTO since his departure from the United States and resettlement in Belarus.

He has a brother named Mark.

== Tubbs Fire ==
Neumann was arrested in 2018 when crossing police lines to access his mother's fire-damaged home in Fountain Grove, California, following the Tubbs Fire. He pleaded no contest at his subsequent trial where he represented himself. He was sentenced to 40 hours of community service and two years probation.

== 2021 United States Capitol attack ==
The US Justice Department stated that Neumann confronted police at the 2021 United States Capitol attack and asked them: "I'm willing to die, are you?" In 2022, NPR quoted the federal indictment against him: "he broke down barricades and used his fists and the metal object to strike officers. He allegedly assaulted at least four different officers over the course of several hours".

Following the events of the day, Neumann left and traveled to several countries, and eventually to Ukraine to escape alleged political persecution by the FBI.

In August 2021, Neumann was concerned that Ukrainian authorities were tracking him and he crossed into Belarus by foot near Pinsk where he sought asylum, claiming he was facing "political persecution" in the US.

In November 2021, he was interviewed on Belarusian state-owned television channel Belarus 1 and rejected the charges against him.

On December 10, 2021, a grand jury indicted him for fourteen offences including assaulting a police officer, and violent entry.

In March 2022, Neumann was granted asylum by the Belarusian government. He was living in Brest, where he opened a restaurant and taught English; the restaurant closed in the summer of 2025.

On January 20, 2025, the first day of the second presidency of Donald Trump, Neumann was pardoned along with nearly every other participant in the Capitol attack, dropping all charges against him. He is now believed to have returned to the US.

== See also ==
- List of cases of the January 6 United States Capitol attack (M-S)
- Criminal proceedings in the January 6 United States Capitol attack
- List of people granted executive clemency in the second Trump presidency
