= Peter Francis Stager =

American Capitol rioter

- Born: 1978 or 1979 (age 47–48)
- Occupation: Truck driver
- Known for: Participation in the January 6 United States Capitol attack
- Convictions: Assaulting, resisting, or impeding a police officer using a deadly or dangerous weapon
- Penalty: 4 years and 4 months in prison

Peter Francis Stager (born 1978 or 1979) is an American truck driver and convicted felon who attacked a police officer with a flagpole during the January 6 United States Capitol attack.

On January 20, 2025, the first day of the second presidency of Donald Trump, Stager was pardoned along with nearly every other participant in the Capitol attack.

== Biography ==
Peter Francis Stager is a truck driver from Conway, Arkansas, who was born in 1978 or 1979.

While participating in the January 6 United States Capitol attack he assaulted a Metropolitan Police Department officer with a flagpole, striking him three times. Video footage from the day captured Stager stating that "death is the only remedy" for politicians in the Capitol building.

On January 12, an informant provided his name to the FBI. After voluntarily surrendering to police, Stager was arrested on January 14, 2021, and held in Pulaski County Detention Center and the D.C. Jail. He was indicted by a grand jury, and his trial was initially delayed.

Stager pleaded guilty to "assaulting, resisting, or impeding a police officer using a deadly or dangerous weapon" on February 16, 2023. On July 24, 2023, he was sentenced to four years and four months in prison by judge Rudolph Contreras. Stager was released from custody early under the First Step Act on October 21, 2024.

On January 20, 2025, the first day of the second presidency of Donald Trump, Stager received a federal pardon along with nearly every other participant in the Capitol attack as part of Trump's pardon of January 6 United States Capitol attack defendants.

== See also ==
- List of cases of the January 6 United States Capitol attack (M-S)
- Criminal proceedings in the January 6 United States Capitol attack
- List of people granted executive clemency in the second Trump presidency
