= Dominic Pezzola =

American Capitol rioter

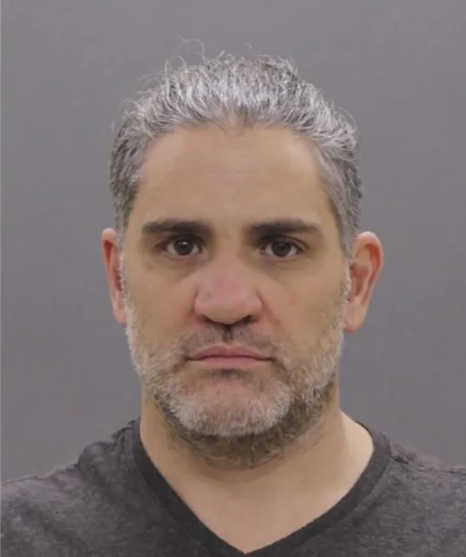
- Pezzola's 2021 mug shot
- Known for: First to breach the U.S. Capitol building on January 6, 2021
- Criminal charges: Obstructing law enforcement, Conspiring to obstruct the counting of the electoral votes
- Criminal status: Previously sentenced to 10 years in federal prison and 3 years of supervised release. As of January 20, 2025, President Trump commuted Pezzola’s sentence, and he has been released.

Dominic Pezzola is an American convicted felon and member of the Proud Boys who participated in the January 6 United States Capitol attack, a violent attack at the U.S. Capitol. He is best known for stealing a police riot shield and using it to break a Capitol window on January 6, 2021, making him the first rioter to breach the building. Indicted in 2021, on federal charges, he was tried in 2023 alongside Proud Boys leader Enrique Tarrio and his key lieutenants, Ethan Nordean, Joseph Biggs, and Zachary Rehl. In May 2023, following a five-month jury trial, Pezzola was convicted of obstructing a congressional proceeding, assaulting a police officer, and other crimes. He was acquitted of seditious conspiracy, the most serious charge (of which all his co-defendants were convicted). The jury deadlocked on other charges against Pezzola, including conspiring to obstruct the counting of the electoral votes.

Prosecutors sought 20 years for Pezzola, who used a stolen police shield to enable the first Capitol breach. Pezzola was sentenced to 10 years in prison on September 1, 2023. Pezzola was incarcerated at the Federal Correctional Complex, Butner in North Carolina. On January 20, 2025, his sentence was commuted to time served by President Donald Trump as part of his pardon of January 6 United States Capitol attack defendants on the first day of his second presidency.

== Background ==
Pezzola is a resident of Rochester, New York. He graduated from The Aquinas Institute of Rochester in 1995. Classmates later described him as an "aloof, angry guy" who was a talented boxer and who frequently got into fights.

After graduation, Pezzola enlisted in the United States Marine Corps. An infantry assaultman, he served from 1998 to 2005. He was honorably discharged at the rank of corporal.

At the time of his arrest in January 2021, he owned a flooring company.

== Proud Boys membership ==
According to Vice News, in the years before his arrest, many of his Facebook friends reported that he was posting increasingly racist and extremist content, and many of them unfriended him.

Pezzola was present at a violent pro-Trump rally in Washington, D.C., on December 12, 2020. During extensive street fighting in the aftermath, four people were stabbed, two police officers were injured, and 23 people were arrested.

=== January 6 United States Capitol attack ===
Pezzola was a fairly new member of the Proud Boys at the time of the January 6 insurrection. In his subsequent criminal trial in 2023, Pezzola's attorney called his common-law wife as a character witness; she testified that Pezzola had joined the Proud Boys in late 2020, after becoming increasingly isolated and obsessed with right-wing politics in mid-2020. She testified that "He started drinking very heavily and inundated himself with Fox News day and night."

According to federal prosecutors, Pezzola was among a group of about 100 Proud Boys who gathered near the Washington Monument at about 10:00 a.m. on January 6, 2021, led on the scene by Ethan Nordean. They had no intention of listening to Donald Trump's speech at The Ellipse. They were dressed incognito instead of in their customary black and yellow garb. Their alleged plan was to "split up into groups, attempt to break into the Capitol building from as many different points as possible, and prevent the Joint Session of Congress from certifying the Electoral College results."

According to prosecutors, during the riot Pezzola "ripped away" an officer's riot shield, and in a "video that has been widely distributed, used it to smash through a window on the exterior of the Capitol building, making him the first rioter to breach the building. An FBI witness said that Pezzola had "bragged about breaking the windows to the Capitol and entering the building" and that Pezzola had "said that anyone they got their hands on they would have killed," including Nancy Pelosi and Mike Pence. According to Politico, "Images of Pezzola smashing the Capitol window quickly proliferated after the attack and became a symbol of the brazen assault on Congress, which forced lawmakers and then-Vice President Mike Pence to flee for safety."

=== Arrest, arraignment, and pre-trial developments ===
Pezzola was arrested nine days after the attack on the Capitol. On the same day, investigators executed a search warrant of Pezzola's home. They seized a thumb drive that contained instructions on the manufacture of homemade firearms, explosives, and poisons. The contents of the thumb drive were one reason why Pezzola was held in pretrial detention. Pezzola unsuccessfully argued in court papers (asking to be released on bond) that he had been duped by Donald Trump.

Pezzola's actions were discussed extensively at the Trump's second impeachment, for incitement of insurrection. Congressional delegate Stacey Plaskett said "Pezzola came to the Capitol on January 6 with deadly intentions," adding "He commandeered a Capitol Police shield, used it to smash a glass window, entered the Capitol, and paved the way for dozens of insurrectionists."

On February 18, 2021, Pezzola's attorney filed a motion for a modification of Pezzola's bond, which included the statement that Pezzola was considering a guilty plea, saying, "Pezzola has indicated his desire to begin disposition negotiations and acceptance of responsibility for his actions." On February 25, Assistant U.S. Attorney Erik Kenerson announced that charges of domestic terrorism would be added against Pezzola, describing it as a crime that "is calculated to influence or affect the conduct of government by intimidation or coercion, or to retaliate against government conduct," adding "At the entrance to the Capitol itself, Pezzola was not just on the front lines, but first to breach a window so successfully that he and other rioters could enter the Capitol through it".

In March 2021, a federal judge denied Pezzola's attorneys' motion seeking their client's release on bail; Pezzola thus remained detained pending trial.

In June 2022, charges of seditious conspiracy were added against Pezzola. Prosecutors said the goal of the conspiracy was "to oppose the lawful transfer of presidential power by force." Pezzola was accused of "encouraging Proud Boys members to attend the January 6 protests, participating in meetings and encrypted conversations in Washington, D.C., to plan the attack, using communications equipment to coordinate the attack as it happened, directing, mobilizing, and leading the crowd onto Capitol grounds and inside the building, dismantling barricades, destroying property and assaulting police."

In October 2022, Pezzola was among 33 jailed January 6 defendants who signed a petition asking to be transferred to the Guantanamo Bay detention camp in Cuba, claiming that the food and medical care was better there and that prisoners there had more religious freedom.

=== Trial and conviction ===
The trial for Pezzola and his four co-defendants began on December 19, 2022. Testimony in the trial began on March 2, 2023, and concluded on April 20. Pezzola and Rehl were the only two to take the stand to testify in their own defense. In his testimony, Pezzola first told the jury that he wanted "to take responsibility for my actions on January 6" but later lashed out on cross-examination, downplaying the violence. Pezzola admitted that he was wearing a hat on which was written "Respect is earned, beatings are free" during the riot. He also admitted that he lied to the FBI regarding whether one of his co-defendants had a firearm during the riot. He called the trial "phony" and "corrupt," arguing that he was speaking metaphorically when he said he was willing to fight for the Proud Boys, comparing his past remarks to "how I'm fighting this corrupt trial with these fake charges."

On May 4, 2023, following a three-month trial and 30 hours of jury deliberation, Pezzola was convicted of multiple charges, including obstruction of a Congressional proceeding, civil disorder, assaulting an officer, robbing an officer and destroying the window. The jury acquitted him of the most serious charge, seditious conspiracy, although his four co-defendants were convicted of that crime. The jury deadlocked on other charges against Pezzola, including conspiring to obstruct the counting of the electoral votes.

=== Sentencing ===
On September 1, 2023, Pezzola was sentenced to 10 years in federal prison and three years supervised release, less than half of the 20 years that prosecutors had sought. In his tearful plea for leniency to the court, Pezzola said he had given up politics, telling the judge, "Your honor, I stand before you as a changed and humbled man." However, minutes after his sentence was handed down, and U.S. District Judge Timothy Kelly had left the courtroom, Pezzola, as he was being escorted out of the courtroom by U.S. Marshals, reversed his earlier stated positions of having given up politics and of having been deceived by Trump. Raising his fist and with a smile, shouted, "Trump won!", repeating Trump's unfounded claim of election fraud, which had led to the Capitol riot.

On January 20, 2025, after beginning his second term in office, President Trump commuted Pezzola's sentence. Notably, Pezzola was one of the few individuals charged with crimes related to January 6 to not be granted a full pardon. Pezzola's attorney confirmed that he had been released from prison the following day.

== See also ==
- List of cases of the January 6 United States Capitol attack (M-S)
- Criminal proceedings in the January 6 United States Capitol attack
- List of people granted executive clemency in the second Trump presidency
