= Guy Reffitt =

American Capitol rioter

- Born: Guy Wesley Reffitt; October 1972 (age 53–54)
- Occupations: Oil rig manager; petroleum industry consultant; sunroom installer
- Organization: Three Percenters
- Known for: Participation in the January 6 United States Capitol attack
- Status: Released (pardoned)
- Convictions: Obstruction of a civil proceeding, entering and remaining on restricted grounds, obstruction of justice
- Penalty: 87 months imprisonment, $2,000 fine, 3 years supervised release

Guy Wesley Reffitt is an American convicted felon who took part in the United States Capitol attack on January 6, 2021. He was a member of the Three Percenters and was the first defendant to be convicted at trial for the attack.

On August 1, 2022, Reffitt was sentenced to 87 months in federal prison with a $2,000 fine and three years of supervised release. He was to have a resentencing hearing as a result of the Supreme Court's ruling in Fischer v. United States.

On January 20, 2025, Reffitt was among the approximately 1,500 people pardoned for the events of January 6 by President Donald Trump.

== Career and politics ==
Reffitt had three children with his wife, former department store operations manager and stay-at-home mother Nicole; his younger daughter Peyton, son Jackson, and elder daughter Sarah. According to The Washington Post, he once fired a gun at the ground next to his wife.

He began his career as a blue-collar worker on oil rigs, but later worked his way up to be a rig manager, gaining a six-figure salary and moving to Thailand, also working in Saudi Arabia, the United Kingdom, the Netherlands, and China. He and his family lived for four years in a condo in Penang, Malaysia, where he worked as an oil industry consultant with an annual income of over $200,000. He became interested in Donald Trump at the start of the candidate's first presidential campaign in 2015, expressing interest in his books including Trump: The Art of the Deal.

In 2016 the price of oil collapsed, causing Reffitt to lose his job; the family lived on their savings and returned to Texas later that year to live in Wylie. He began work installing sunrooms. COVID-19 restrictions caused Reffitt's business to shut down in 2020, and he again lost his job. His politics moved further right, and he expressed that the country needed stronger borders and more police resources. He began to spend time with the Three Percenters militia group that summer, and became a member and recruiter before the 2020 U.S. election, hosting an event for the militia's local branch at their home. In contrast, Reffitt's son Jackson became more left wing following the murder of George Floyd that year.

== January 6 United States Capitol attack ==
=== Preparations and "Stop the Steal" rally ===
In December 2020, less than two weeks prior to the riot, Reffitt's son Jackson contacted the FBI to report concerns about his father's behavior and rhetoric; the FBI did not respond until after the riot on January 6, 2021. Reffitt later communicated to his fellow militia members that "the fuel is set" and that "we will strike the match ... on the 6th."

Reffitt drove from his Texas home to Washington D.C. for January 6 with Rocky Hardie, a fellow Three Percenters member. They arrived at the Stop the Steal rally, both armed with holstered handguns, and Reffitt gave Hardie two pairs of zip-tie cuffs. Reffitt also brought an AR-15 rifle but left it locked in his car. He recorded himself stating at the rally that "we're all gonna drag them motherfuckers out kicking and screaming. I don't give a shit. I just want to see Pelosi's head hit every fucking stair on the way out. Fuck yeah. And Mitch McConnell, too. Fuck 'em all."

=== Capitol attack ===
Reffitt, alongside a mob of other rioters, approached the west side of the Capitol building armed with a holstered Smith & Wesson pistol, zip tie handcuff, a helmet with a video camera, and body armor. His camera recorded him stating that they would take over the Capitol "before the day is over." He used a megaphone to shout at police to let the mob through and for the mob to push past them. An officer pepper sprayed him in the face, and he stayed back while waving other rioters on; these rioters later breached the building; he chose not to enter the building himself.

Following the attack, Reffitt texted to a fellow Three Percenters member "we took the Capital [sic] of the United States of America and we will do it again". He returned to Texas the following day. His 18-year-old son Jackson recorded Reffitt boasting about his role in the riot, and would go on to testify at Reffitt's trial that his father told him and his 16-year-old sister Peyton that "if you turn me in, you're a traitor, and traitors get shot." Although Peyton did not believe Reffitt was seriously threatening them, Jackson had a meeting with an FBI agent on the same day, during which he shared text messages and recordings of his private conversations with his father.

=== Arrest ===
Reffitt was arrested in the morning of January 16 when the FBI raided their house following Jackson's report, and jailed for approximately 19 months following the attack. The FBI found a handgun in a holster in his bedroom during a search of his home. During his time in jail, he raised funds by publishing statements as well as a manifesto he had dictated to his family by phone, portraying himself and other rioters as patriots rebelling against the U.S. government. Jackson was interviewed on CNN the next week, stating that he had alerted the authorities of his father; he had moved out of the house and largely cut off communications with his family just before the interview as they had not known of this detail before the interview. Following the interview Jackson set up a GoFundMe account, generating around $158,000 from then until the trial in March 2022. Peyton later moved in with her older sister due to frequent panic attacks caused by the family falling out.

=== Trial and incarceration ===
Reffitt was convicted on March 8, 2022, the first defendant to be convicted by a jury for the attack. The conviction followed a three-hour deliberation in which he pleaded not guilty. During the trial, the prosecution argued that Reffitt "lit the match that started the fire" for the mob to charge at officers in the attack. He did not testify at the trial, and was convicted on all five counts in his indictment; two counts of civil disorder, and one count each of obstructing an official proceeding, entering and remaining in a restricted building or grounds with a firearm, and obstruction of justice. Reffitt's conviction was considered a "milestone victory" by prosecutors as it indicated a trend for other Capitol riot cases.

He was returned to the D.C. Jail, and became a close friend of fellow rioter and Oath Keepers member Jessica Watkins while there through a shared enjoyment of Magic: The Gathering. During this time he became convinced of the false belief that law enforcement staged the riot to entrap protesters.

Judge Dabney L. Friedrich presided over his trial. His two youngest children testified, with Jackson speaking about the threats he received and Peyton stating he was "not a threat to my family," and that his mental health was a "real issue." Reffitt himself apologised to the police and his family, stating that he had been "a little too crazy," and to the judge for his previous inarticulate statements, stating he wanted "nothing to do with this stuff anymore." The federal prosecutor for the case initially requested a 15-year prison sentence via an upward departure for terrorism (the first time this had been requested for a Capitol riot case), claiming that Reffitt was a domestic terrorist and that he wanted to physically remove and replace Congress members. Friedrich rejected this. Clinton Broden, Reffitt's defense, asked for a sentence of no more than two years. Reffitt was sentenced on August 1, 2022, to seven years and three months in federal prison with a $2,000 fine and three years of supervised release; at the time, this was the longest sentence imposed up to that point among the Capitol riot cases, beating the previous longest sentence by two years. Friedrich also ordered him to receive mental health treatment, and instructed him not to contact Three Percenters members or members of other militia groups while on probation.

As of September 2023, Reffitt was being temporarily held in Fannin County jail in Bonham, Texas.

=== Resentencing ===
With its June 28, 2024 decision in Fischer v. United States, the Supreme Court ruled that the government's novel use of the Sarbanes–Oxley Act to convict Joseph W. Fischer for his part in the events of January 6 relied on an overly broad reading of the statute. Among the first 1,350 defendants charged for their participation in January 6, Reffitt was one of 350 specifically accused of violating 18 U.S.C. § 1512(c)(2), the statute at issue in Fischer. Within days of the Supreme Court's decision, Judge Friedrich began the process of scheduling new proceedings for Reffitt and others, noting that they would have resentencing hearings.

=== Pardon ===
On January 20, 2025, Reffitt was pardoned by President Donald Trump, along with nearly every other participant in the Capitol attack.

On January 6, 2026, Reffitt and his wife returned to the Capitol to commemorate the fifth anniversary of the Capitol attack.

== In popular culture ==
Fatherland, a courtroom drama stage play based on the United States vs. Guy Wesley Reffitt case and Jackson's relationship with his father, directed by Stephen Sachs, debuted in 2024.

The Franco-German television channel Arte has dedicated a documentary to him, "Trump, My Father and Me," which explores the relationship between his son and Guy, covering the events of January 6th and the subsequent trial.

== See also ==
- List of cases of the January 6 United States Capitol attack (M-S)
- Criminal proceedings in the January 6 United States Capitol attack
- List of people granted executive clemency in the second Trump presidency
