= Roberto Minuta =

American convicted seditionist

- Born: 1983 or 1984
- Occupation: Tattoo artist
- Organization: Oath Keepers
- Criminal charges: Seditious conspiracy, conspiracy to obstruct an official proceeding, obstruction of an official proceeding and aiding and abetting, and conspiracy to prevent a member of Congress from discharging their official duties.
- Penalty: 54-months imprisonment

Roberto Antonio Minuta is an American tattoo artist and a member of the Oath Keepers, who in 2023 was found guilty of seditious conspiracy after forcing his way into the United States Capitol building during the January 6 United States Capitol attack in 2021.

Minuta organized a 2021 rally and defied New York State COVID-19 public health regulations. On January 20, 2025, President Donald Trump commuted his sentence to "time served".

== Personal and work life ==
Minuta was born 1983 or 1984. He is a member of the Oath Keepers and a key ally of Stewart Rhodes, the leader of the far-right group. He lived in Newburgh, New York, and ran the Casa Di Dolore tattoo shop before relocating to Prosper, Texas.

In 2020, Minuta opened his tattoo shop, deliberately breaching COVID-19 public health rules. On May 30, 2020, he organized a rally to protest against the rules.

== January 6 United States Capitol attack ==
During the January 6 United States Capitol attack Minuta "clashed with police", entered the United States Capitol building, and used social media to broadcast videos. In his video broadcasts he stated "You know what? Millions will die. So what? ... Get your fucking soul ready. Get right with God." Earlier in the day, Minuta had been part of a team providing security services to Roger Stone. He was photographed with armored gloves, goggles and bear spray on January 6.

Minuta was arrested on March 8, 2021. In January 2023, he was tried with co-defendants Joseph Hackett, David Moerschel and Edward Vallejo, each of whom were charged with seditious conspiracy. On January 23, 2023, he was found guilty of seditious conspiracy, conspiracy to obstruct an official proceeding, obstruction of an official proceeding and aiding and abetting, and conspiracy to prevent a member of Congress from discharging their official duties. He was found not guilty of tampering with documents or proceedings. On June 1, US District Judge Amit Mehta sentenced Minuta to 54 months.

On January 20, 2025, the first day of the second presidency of Donald Trump, Minuta's sentence was commuted to time served.

== See also ==
- COVID-19 pandemic in New York (state)
- List of cases of the January 6 United States Capitol attack (M-S)
- Criminal proceedings in the January 6 United States Capitol attack
- List of people granted executive clemency in the second Trump presidency
- List of tattoo artists
