= Ethan Nordean =

American far-right activist and seditionist

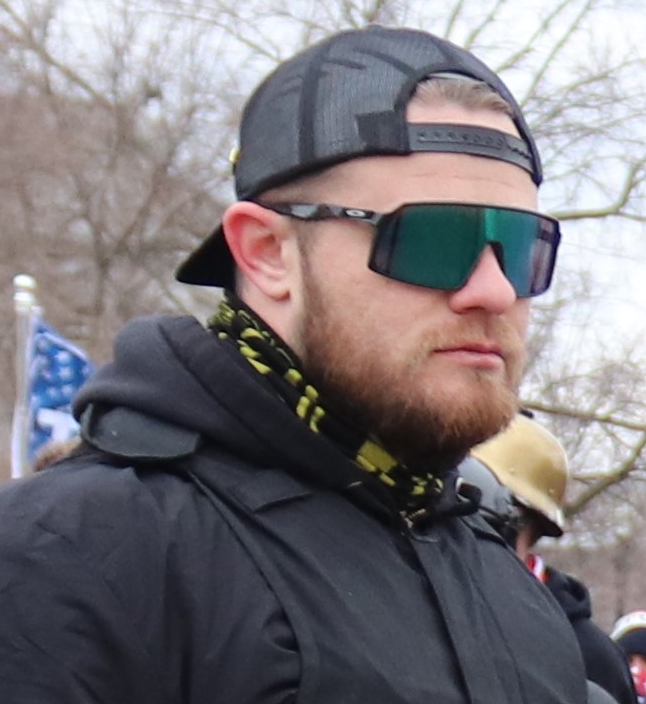
- Nordean on January 6, 2021
- Born: 1990 or 1991 (age 35–36)
- Other name: Rufio Panman
- Organization: Proud Boys
- Known for: Proud Boys recruiter and leader
- Criminal charges: Disorderly conduct Obstructing an official proceeding Seditious conspiracy
- Criminal penalty: 18 years in prison
- Criminal status: Sentenced and pardoned
- Children: 1

Ethan Nordean (born 1990 or 1991), also known as Rufio Panman, is an American far-right political activist, convicted seditionist and a leader of the Proud Boys, an all-male neo-fascist organization that engages in political violence.

He played a prominent role in the January 6, 2021, attack against the U.S. Capitol, and was arrested four weeks later on federal criminal charges. In March 2021, a federal grand jury in the U.S. District Court for the District of Columbia indicted Nordean and three other Proud Boys members for conspiracy. He was subsequently indicted on seditious conspiracy charges in June 2022, along with four other Proud Boy leaders, for his role in the attack. In May 2023, Nordean was found guilty of seditious conspiracy and multiple other felonies; three other members of the Proud Boys were also convicted at trial. On September 1, 2023, he was sentenced to 18 years in prison. On January 20, 2025, his sentence was commuted by President Donald Trump to time served.

== Activism ==
In mid-2017, Nordean started attending rallies in Seattle and Portland, Oregon organized by the far right Patriot Prayer group. According to Dave Neiwert, a journalist and author who covers far right political groups, "He's particularly noteworthy for the extraordinary levels of thuggish violence he brings to these events". On June 30, 2018, Nordean and other members of the Proud Boys participated in a demonstration in Portland organized by Joey Gibson, founder of Patriot Prayer. Police declared the event a riot after violent street fighting broke out amid tensions between anti-fascist activists and Patriot Prayer supporters. Video showed Nordean shoving one counter protester to the ground before another approached with a metal baton. Nordean was wearing shin guards on his forearms and deflected the baton, then punched the man in the face, knocking him to the ground unconscious. According to a police report, the counter-protester was hospitalized with a concussion.

Following that incident, a meme featuring video of that punch went viral, and Gavin McInnes, founder of the Proud Boys, praised Nordean's role in the violent episode, calling it "the turning point in our war against antifa". McInnes compared it to the assassination of Archduke Franz Ferdinand, which triggered World War I.

The footage of the incident was used in recruiting videos for the Proud Boys that featured special effects and dramatic music. By October 2019, five of the most popular videos had over 1.5 million views on YouTube.

Shortly thereafter, Nordean was interviewed at length on The Alex Jones Show, with the video playing constantly in the background. During his interview with Jones, Nordean said "Like Gavin McInnes says, violence isn't great, but justified violence is amazing." Describing left-wing counter-protesters, Nordean told Jones and his audience that "these are no longer people who are necessarily Americans, per se, but they're kind of anti-American" and "you just have to eliminate them as a threat".

Joe Rogan discussed Nordean's role in the violent incident on his podcast, in a segment about antifa and street fighting. Nordean was later interviewed by Alex Jones a second time.

Nordean set up a private Facebook page to vet the fighting abilities of Proud Boys recruits. Despite complaints in 2018, Facebook declined to take down that page.

=== Rise to Proud Boys leadership ===
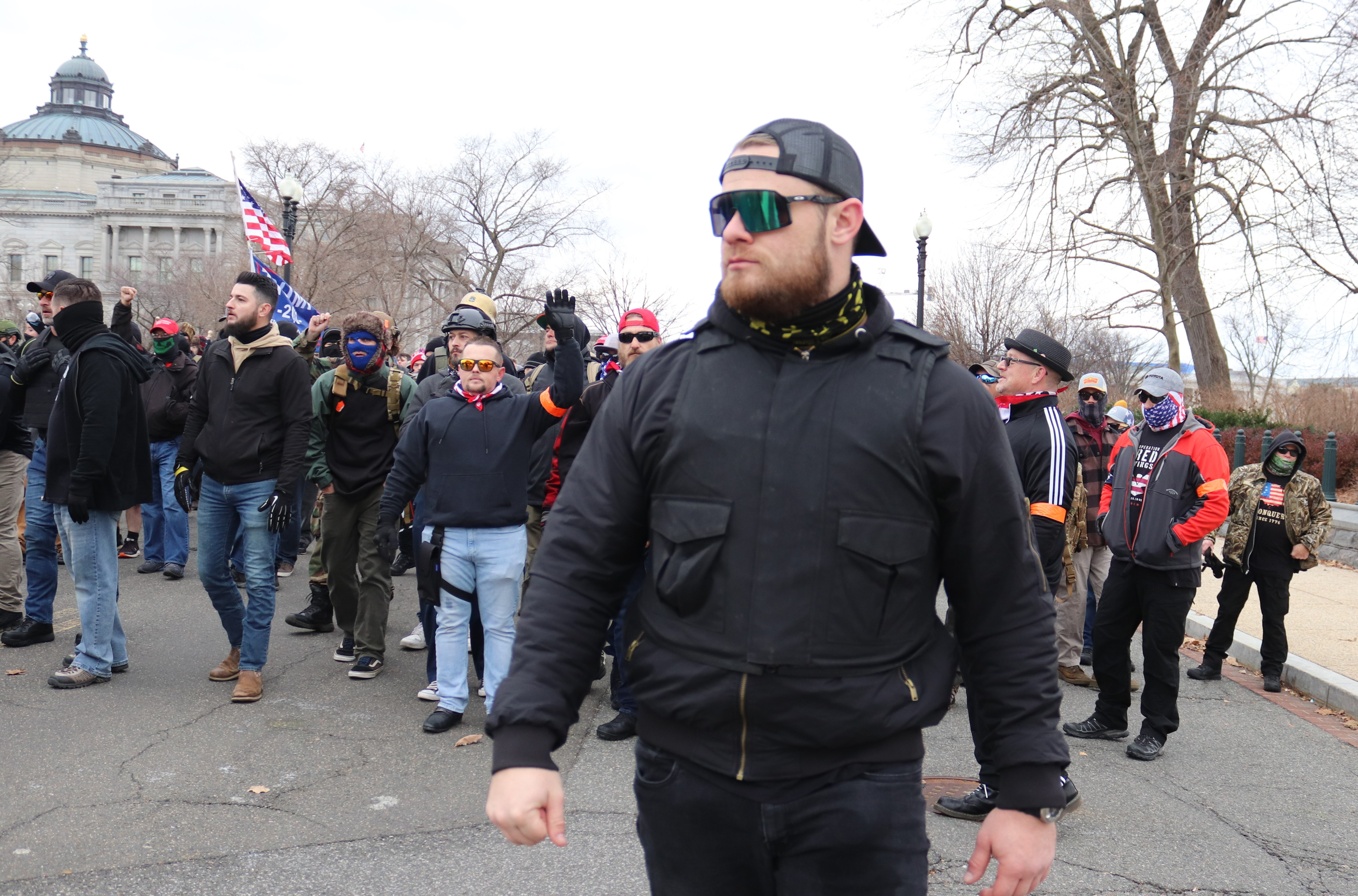
Nordean leads a Proud Boys contingent past the Library of Congress near the Capitol Building on January 6, 2021

Nordean was designated "Proud Boy of the Week" by the group's magazine. On November 25, 2018, the Proud Boys released their revised bylaws on Scribd with the names of the top leadership supposedly redacted. Due to a technical error, the names could be recovered, and Nordean was listed as a member of the eight man "Elder Chapter", the top level leadership group, under his alias, Rufio Panman.

In the years that followed, Nordean took a leading role as an organizer of Proud Boys events and rallies. Devin Burghart, president of the Institute for Research & Education on Human Rights, said, "He's been helping map the direction of the organization and recruiting members ... In no small part, he's been responsible for moving the group even more to the extreme far right and on a more violent path forward." Nordean operated a video podcast called "Rebel Talk with Rufio".

=== Following the 2020 U.S. presidential election ===
On December 11, 2020, Nordean was on the stage during a demonstration before the December 12 Stop The Steal rally in Washington, DC, alongside Roger Stone and fellow Proud Boys leader Enrique Tarrio. InfoWars personality Owen Shroyer also spoke to the crowd, claiming that the Supreme Court had stabbed people in the back.

On December 27, 2020, Nordean posted on Parler, saying "Anyone looking to help us with safety/protective gear, or communications equipment it would be much appreciated, things have gotten more dangerous for us this past year, anything helps". On January 4, 2021, Nordean posted a video on his Rebel Talk with Rufio podcast that was captioned, "Let them remember the day they decided to make war with us".

In the run-up to the events at the Capitol on January 6, Proud Boys leader Enrique Tarrio urged the Proud Boys to set aside their usual black and yellow garb, and attempt to blend in with the crowd. Biggs and Nordean echoed his call on social media.

=== Participation in the 2021 Capitol attack ===
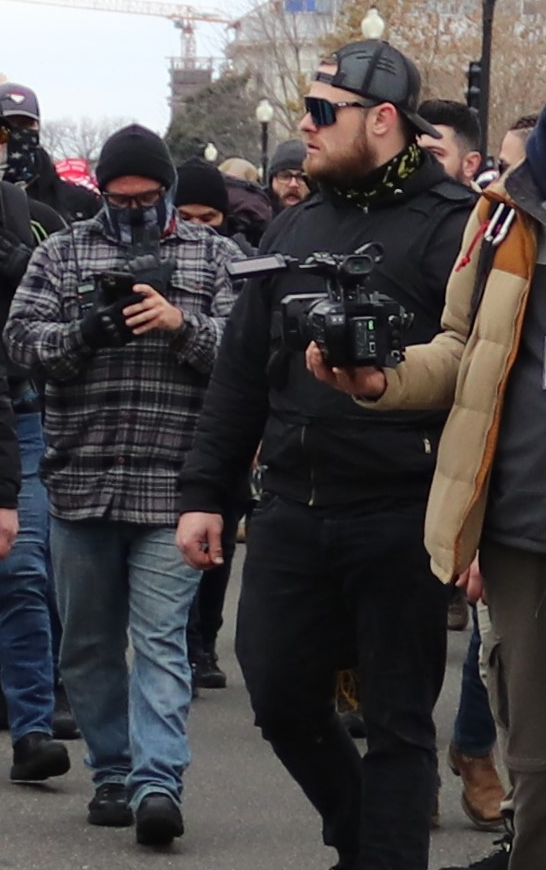
Joe Biggs and Nordean on Jan. 6

A video documentary produced by the Wall Street Journal showed that, on January 6, Nordean and fellow Proud Boys leader Joe Biggs from Florida commanded a mob of about 100 Proud Boys members and supporters who assembled east of the United States Capitol Building. A video livestreamer who is a member of the Proud Boys described Biggs and Nordean as "Two men on a mission, with about 500 behind them ready to kick some butt for the benefit of this country".

They marched south past the Library of Congress and the Supreme Court building, and circled around the Capitol complex, approaching from the southwest. The Proud Boys contingent constituted a "a large proportion of the first wave" that reached the Capitol, and one Proud Boys member, Dominic Pezzola, used a seized police shield to break a window to gain access to the building.

Prosecutors alleged Nordean was a chief organizer of a mob of about 100 Proud Boys that marched through Washington before the breach of the Capitol.

==== Arrest and aftermath ====
According to prosecutors, on January 8, Nordean posted an image of a Capitol Police officer shooting pepper spray at rioters. The caption read, "If you feel bad for the police, you are part of the problem..." On February 3, Nordean was arrested and charged with four federal crimes, including obstructing an official proceeding, aiding and abetting injury to government property, disorderly conduct and knowingly and violently entering a restricted building. If convicted on all four charges, Nordean could be sentenced to up to 40 years in prison.

On February 7, federal judge Beryl Howell denied Nordean's bail request, and ordered him to be returned to Washington, DC pending trial. Prosecutors argued that "There is no reason to believe that Defendant, or any of his Proud Boy associates, are any more interested in 'complacency,' or any less interested in fomenting rebellion, than they were on January 5," adding, "If nothing else, the events of January 6, 2021, have exposed the size and determination of right-wing fringe groups in the United States, and their willingness to place themselves and others in danger to further their political ideology."

On March 3, 2021, Howell ordered Nordean released to home detention with GPS monitoring pending trial, finding that though he "indisputably participated" in the Capitol assault, the government's evidence of specific acts of violence and property damage was "weak." Before ruling, the judge noted that evidence clearly showed Nordean had been heavily involved in organizing the Proud Boys on January 6, 2021.

In April 2021, district judge Timothy J. Kelly revoked Nordean's pretrial release, returning him to jail. The judge cited an abundance of evidence for planned violence.

Prosecutors included in a May 2021 court filing a Telegram message Nordean had sent expressing a sense of betrayal, lamenting that Trump had pardoned "a bunch of degenerates as his last move and shit on us on the way out" and "now I've got some of my good friends and myself facing jail time cuz [sic] we followed this guys [sic] lead and never questioned it."

== Sentencing ==
Nordean told the judge, “the truth is, I did help lead a group of men back to the Capitol. There is no excuse for my actions, ignoring police commands, going past barricades, entering the Capitol. Adding myself to the dangerous situation was sorely irresponsible. I would like to take the time to apologize to anyone I wronged. There is no excuse for what I did. I would also like to apologize for my lack of leadership that day.”

The prosecution asked U.S. District Judge Timothy J. Kelly to enhance the sentence of Nordean by ruling that their acts to disrupt the electoral vote certification qualified as terrorism. Kelly had agreed to this request of prosecutors.

Prosecutors called for a sentence of 27 years. Nordean was sentenced to 18 years in prison by Judge Timothy J. Kelly in September, 2023.

== Personal life ==
Nordean has lived in or near Auburn, Washington his entire life. He is married and has a daughter.

His father, Michael Nordean, owns and operates Wally's Chowder House restaurants in Des Moines and Buckley in Washington state; further, Ethan formerly worked in the family business. A dedicated bodybuilder, he also operated a now-defunct business in 2017 called Bangarang Elite Supplements that sold protein powder.

Nordean's alias derives from a character in the 1991 Peter Pan movie Hook.

In June 2020, Nordean's father issued a statement calling his son's beliefs "misguided;" he reported that "Ethan no longer works for our restaurants." Following the storming of the Capitol and his son's arrest, he issued another statement that said, "We have tried for a long while to get our son off the path which led to his arrest today — to no avail. Ethan will be held accountable for his actions."

== See also ==
- List of cases of the January 6 United States Capitol attack (M-S)
- Criminal proceedings in the January 6 United States Capitol attack
- List of people granted executive clemency in the second Trump presidency
