= Erin Schaff =

American photographer

- Born: 1989 (age 36–37); New York City, U.S.
- Education: Kenyon College (B.A., 2011)
- Occupations: Photographer, photojournalist
- Employer: The New York Times
- Website: www.erinschaff.com

Erin Schaff is an American photographer and photojournalist. She currently works as a political photographer for The New York Times based in Washington, D.C. She has covered numerous political events in Washington, D.C., most notably the Ford-Kavanaugh sexual assault hearings, the first impeachment of Donald Trump, and the first impeachment trial of Donald Trump.

== Biography ==
Erin Schaff was born in New York City and grew up in Red Hook, New York. She attended Emma Willard School, a private women's boarding school in Troy, New York. She credits the AP Government class she took at Emma Willard School with interesting her in politics.

Schaff studied political science and women's and gender studies at Kenyon College, receiving a B.A. in political science. She originally intended to pursue a career in politics and worked in the office of Senator Kirsten Gillibrand at one point.

== Career ==
As a freelance photojournalist, Schaff covered Melania Trump's visit to the National Gallery, Mark Zuckerberg's testimony in the Facebook–Cambridge Analytica data scandal, and the funeral of John McCain. She also wrote several stories for The New York Times.

In a high-profile freelance assignment, Schaff covered for The New York Times the Senate Judiciary Committee hearing in which Christine Blasey Ford testified her sexual assault allegations against Supreme Court nominee Brett Kavanaugh and Kavanaugh testified denying the allegations. She was one of only eight photographers allowed in the hearing room at once, and one of only two women in the pool of photographers. Three of her photographs from the event were selected for the front page of the newspaper. Schaff received accolades from female photographers for her coverage of the hearing in a male-dominated field; a 2016 World Press Photo report found that women comprised only 15 percent of photojournalists.

Bustle commended Schaff for a photograph she took of Abigail Spanberger and her daughter at her victory speech for election to the House of Representatives representing Virginia's 7th congressional district in 2018.

Schaff worked as creative director for FotoWeekDC and photographer and photo editor for Georgetowner. She was also the vice president of Women Photojournalists of Washington (WPOW), an organization focused on supporting women-identifying photojournalists in Washington, D.C., and educating the public about their role.

In February 2019, Schaff was hired by The New York Times as a staff photographer. She was the first photographer the newspaper hired full-time in more than 10 years. As her work involves people living through traumatic events, she notes, "I prioritize people’s mental health over anything else. It’s a gift for people to share the private moments of their lives in such a public way, and I strive to be deserving of their trust to tell their stories honestly."

In January 2021, during the storming of the United States Capitol, Schaff was surrounded by rioters inside the Capitol, who stole her ID badge, threw her to the floor, and attempted to take her cameras. She was then held at gunpoint by police before other photojournalists identified her as a journalist. On January 13, her photo of National Guard soldiers stationed in the Capitol circulated widely. In the photo, soldiers are seen sleeping under a statue of Abraham Lincoln next to a plaque that commemorates the troops quartered in the Capitol in 1861 to defend from insurrection.

== Awards and recognition ==
Of the photographs Schaff took during the Ford-Kavanaugh sexual assault hearings, two were featured in Time magazine's Top 100 Photos of 2018 and one was featured in Women Photograph: 2018 Year in Pictures.

Nine of Schaff's photographs were featured in The New York Times' The Year In Pictures 2019.

In the 2020 White House News Photographers Association Eyes of History Still Contest, Schaff's works won several awards. These include the top honor of "Political Photo of the Year", as well as first place in the categories "On Capitol Hill" and "Picture Story/Politics", second place in the categories "Political Portfolio" and "Portfolio", third place in the category "Picture Story/Politics", and award of excellence in the categories "On Capitol Hill" and "Insider's Washington". Her work selected as Political Photo of the Year was from her coverage of the impeachment of Donald Trump; she commented that her approach to that assignment was inspired by portrait photographer Richard Avedon.

Schaff's work was featured in the exhibition "Women Photojournalists of Washington" at the HUB-Robeson Galleries in March/April 2020.
