= Fischer v. United States (2024) =

Court case relating to January 6 Capitol attack

- Supreme Court of the United States

Argued April 16, 2024 Decided June 28, 2024
- Full case name: Joseph W. Fischer v. United States
- Docket no.: 23-5572
- Argument: Oral argument

Case history
- Prior: Dismissed charge of obstruction, 1:21-cr-234-CJN (D.D.C. 2022); reversed, 64 F.4th 329 (D.C. Cir. 2023)

Questions presented
- Did the D.C. Circuit err in construing 18 U.S.C. § 1512(c) ("Witness, Victim, or Informant Tampering"), which prohibits obstruction of congressional inquiries and investigations, to include acts unrelated to investigations and evidence?

Holding
- To prove a violation of 18 U.S.C. § 1512(c), the Government must establish that the defendant impaired the availability or integrity for use in an official proceeding of records, documents, objects, or other things used in an official proceeding, or attempted to do so.

Court membership
- Chief Justice John Roberts Associate Justices Clarence Thomas · Samuel Alito; Sonia Sotomayor · Elena Kagan; Neil Gorsuch · Brett Kavanaugh; Amy Coney Barrett · Ketanji Brown Jackson

Case opinions
- Majority: Roberts, joined by Thomas, Alito, Gorsuch, Kavanaugh, Jackson
- Concurrence: Jackson
- Dissent: Barrett, joined by Sotomayor, Kagan

Laws applied
- Sarbanes-Oxley Act

Fischer v. United States, 603 U.S. 480 (2024), was a United States Supreme Court case about the proper use of the felony charge of obstructing an official proceeding, established in the Sarbanes–Oxley Act, against participants in the January 6 United States Capitol attack. The Supreme Court ruled 6–3 in June 2024 that the charge only applied when the defendant "impaired the availability or integrity" (attempted or successfully) of a physical document or object used in an official proceeding.

== Background ==
On January 6, 2021, Joseph W. Fischer attended the Stop the Steal rally at the Ellipse in Washington, D.C. Prosecutors said that Fischer had a physical encounter with police at the Capitol, urged on rioters during the Capitol attack, and said that he wanted to go "to war" and take "democratic Congress to the gallows". Fischer's attorneys said that Fischer entered the Capitol building at around 3:25 p.m., after it had already been breached and Congress had already recessed, and exited the building about four minutes later.

The felony charge of obstructing an official proceeding has been used to charge more than 300 individuals in connection with the January 6 Capitol attack, and has resulted in more than 150 convictions and guilty pleas. Among those charged with the provision include former President Donald Trump. The criminal statute covering "whoever corruptly alters, destroys, mutilates or conceals a record, document or other object ... or otherwise obstructs, influences or impedes any official proceeding, or attempts to do so" had been created by the 2002 Sarbanes–Oxley Act in response to the Enron scandal, when accountants shredding crucial documents did so without being in violation of any laws. Before its utilization in the January 6 charges, prosecutors had never applied the statute in cases that did not involve evidence tampering.

=== District court ===
Fischer was prosecuted for obstructing an official proceeding of Congress, as well as assaulting a police officer and disorderly conduct in the Capitol. Fischer and other January 6 defendants have argued that prosecution under the Sarbanes–Oxley Act should not apply to their circumstances, as they did not engage in actions in a manner similar to the Enron scandal which spawned the act's creation.

In March 2022, District Judge Carl J. Nichols dismissed obstruction charges against three January 6 defendants, including Fischer, ruling that prosecutors had improperly separated the portion of the law forbidding obstruction of an official proceeding from the aforementioned evidence-tampering provision regarding actions against a "document, record, or other object". Nichols's ruling was not binding on other judges, and several other defendants have attempted to similarly argue that Sarbanes–Oxley does not apply to them before other judges without success. Nichols's rulings were subsequently appealed to the D.C. Circuit Court of Appeals.

=== Court of Appeals ===
In April 2023, the D.C. Circuit reversed Nichols in a 2–1 ruling, finding that Sarbanes-Oxley was broad enough to cover the conduct of Fischer and the other two defendants. It held that the statute covered "all forms of corrupt obstruction of an official proceeding", other than actions already covered by the evidence-tampering provision. Fischer also argued that he did not act with "corrupt intent", which was not addressed immediately by the D.C. Circuit. The court rejected this argument in a subsequent January 6 related case, United States v. Robertson, holding that "corruptly" in this context means acting with criminal intent, without an additional requirement of personal gain.

== Supreme Court ==
Fischer appealed the D.C. Circuit's ruling to the Supreme Court in September 2023, and the Supreme Court agreed to hear his appeal in December. The Supreme Court did not take up the cases of the other two defendants. Multiple federal judges have delayed cases or released defendants charged with obstruction of an official proceeding pending the Supreme Court's ruling. Oral arguments in the case were heard on April 16, 2024.

On June 28, 2024, the Supreme Court vacated the D.C. Circuit's ruling, and remanded the case for further proceedings. Chief Justice John Roberts wrote for the majority, saying that the government must establish that a defendant "impaired the availability or integrity" of records, documents, or other objects used in an official proceeding. Roberts wrote that "a general phrase can be given a more focused meaning by the terms linked to it" and stated that the scope of the "obstructing an official proceeding" provision is sensibly inferred as limited by the preceding evidence tampering provision. Roberts noted that "there would have been scant reason for Congress to provide any specific examples at all" if the obstruction proceeding could be applied so sweepingly on its own.

In a concurring opinion, Justice Ketanji Brown Jackson wrote that it "beggars belief that Congress would have inserted a breathtakingly broad, first-of-its kind criminal obstruction statute (accompanied by a substantial 20-year maximum penalty) in the midst of a significantly more granular series of obstruction prohibitions without clarifying its intent to do so". She stated that courts reviewing January 6 cases may judge whether the statute could apply to January 6 defendants, due to potential impacts on electoral certificates and other documents during the riot.

Justice Amy Coney Barrett, joined by justices Sonia Sotomayor and Elena Kagan, filed a dissent, saying that the Court's reading of the statute is too limited and requires the majority to find "any way to narrow the reach" of the law. Barrett wrote that while an event such as January 6 would not be the envisioned target of the obstruction provision, a textual-focused interpretation of the provision allows statutes to "go further than the problem that inspired them".

== Impact ==
Federal prosecutors estimate that the ruling could affect about 250 of the roughly 1,400 people who were charged in the Capitol attack. About 350 people were charged under the obstructing an official proceeding provision, for which prosecutors are now required to demonstrate an evidence-tampering related motive. This includes at least some of the charges against prominent defendants such as Guy Reffitt, Stewart Rhodes, Enrique Tarrio, and Jacob Chansley. The U.S. Attorney for D.C. said that for all defendants charged with obstruction of an official proceeding, they faced other criminal charges, and about 52 defendants were charged with obstruction of an official proceeding as their only felony.

Although it remains unclear how the ruling affects Donald Trump's obstruction charges, some legal scholars, including professor and former federal prosecutor Randall Eliason, have said that prosecutors still have strong arguments they can use to keep them intact. Special counsel Jack Smith has said that Trump's efforts to use false electoral certificates allowed the charges to remain under a ruling in favor of Fischer.
