= Kelly Meggs =

American seditionist (born 1969)

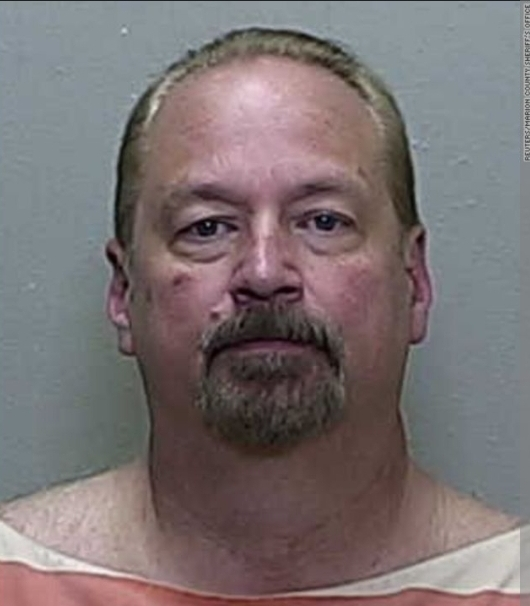
- 2021 mugshot of Meggs
- Born: January 15, 1969 (age 57)
- Organization: Oath Keepers
- Notable work: Fight, Fight, Fight; One Question Remains
- Status: Pardoned
- Convictions: Seditious conspiracy (18 U.S.C. § 2384); Obstructing an official proceeding (18 U.S.C. § 1512); Conspiracy to obstruct an official proceeding (18 U.S.C. § 1512); Conspiracy to prevent an officer from discharging their duties (18 U.S.C. § 372); Tampering with documents and proceedings (18 U.S.C. § 1512)
- Penalty: 12 years imprisonment

Kelly Meggs (born January 15, 1969) is an American convicted seditionist who previously led the Oath Keepers' Florida chapter. He was found guilty of seditious conspiracy following his forced entry into the United States Capitol during the January 6 United States Capitol attack. Meggs was sentenced to 12 years in prison. Hours after his second inauguration on 20 January 2025, Donald Trump commuted his sentence to time served. On January 24, 2025, he and seven other Oath Keepers were forbidden by the D.C. District Court from entering Washington, D.C., and the grounds of the Capitol without the permission of a court order.

== Oath Keepers activities ==
Meggs was the leader of the Florida chapter of the alt-right and anti-government Oath Keepers organization.

Prior to the riot, Meggs discussed a partnership with the Proud Boys and the Three Percenters, another anti-government organization; he declared his intentions on Facebook.

Meggs entered the United States Capitol during the January 6 United States Capitol attack. He led the infamous "stack" formation of Oath Keepers inside the Capitol.

=== Seditious conspiracy trial ===
Meggs was arrested on February 17, 2021. He was held in Grady County, Oklahoma, before being transferred to Washington, D.C. for his trial. The court case included Stewart Rhodes as co-defendant.

During the trial, prosecutors highlighted texts between Meggs and his wife on the night of the 2020 United States presidential election, in which Meggs declared, "I'm gonna go on a killing spree... Pelosi first."

Meggs was represented at trial by lawyer Stanley Woodward. On November 29, 2022, Meggs was found guilty of seditious conspiracy and "conspiracy to prevent an officer from discharging their official duties".

On May 25, 2023, he was sentenced to 12 years in prison. Meggs would be on supervised release for three years after his prison sentence.

Meggs was released on January 21, 2025, after receiving a commutation by President Donald Trump, but on January 24, 2025, the D.C. District Court forbade Meggs and seven other Oath Keepers from entering Washington, D.C., or the grounds of the Capitol without the permission of a court order.

== Personal life ==
Prior to his incarceration, Meggs lived in Dunnellon, Florida, with his wife, Connie Meggs. Connie Meggs was found guilty in March 2023 of conspiracy to obstruct an official proceeding and other felony charges. At her sentencing hearing, Connie Meggs accused her husband of destroying their family.

== See also ==
- List of cases of the January 6 United States Capitol attack (M-S)
- Criminal proceedings in the January 6 United States Capitol attack
- List of people granted executive clemency in the second Trump presidency
