= Seditious conspiracy =

Crime of conspiring against the state

Seditious conspiracy is a crime in various jurisdictions of conspiring against the authority or legitimacy of the state. As a form of sedition, it has been described as a serious but lesser counterpart to treason, targeting activities that undermine the state without directly attacking it.

== Common law ==
In common law jurisdictions, seditious conspiracy is an agreement by two or more persons to do any act with the intention to excite hatred or contempt against the persons or institutions of state, to excite the alteration by unlawful means of a state or church matter established by law, to raise discontent among the people, or to promote ill will and enmity between classes. Criticising a policy or state institution for the purpose of obtaining lawful reform is not seditious. Seditious conspiracy, like other forms of sedition, developed during the late medieval period to apply to activities that threatened the social order but fell short of constructive treason. Enforcement of both types of offence under the Tudors and Stuarts grew increasingly harsh; courts judged the accused's intentions suspiciously, allowing juries to decide only whether the alleged events had occurred. A trend of jury nullifications in the 18th century ultimately limited the scope of seditious crimes.

Charges of seditious conspiracy were notably brought in the United Kingdom against Irish radicals and Chartists in the 19th century before being abolished in 2010. The charge has been used against labour activists in both Canada and Australia, such as the leaders of the 1919 Winnipeg general strike and the Sydney Twelve. In British India, the charge was used to imprison independence activists, and the extension of their imprisonment by the 1919 Rowlatt Act led to Mahatma Gandhi's call for nonviolent resistance.

In Canada, the maximum sentence for seditious conspiracy is 14 years in jail.

== United States ==
In the United States, seditious conspiracy is codified at 18 U.S.C. § 2384:

If two or more persons in any State or Territory, or in any place subject to the jurisdiction of the United States, conspire to overthrow, put down, or to destroy by force the Government of the United States, or to levy war against them, or to oppose by force the authority thereof, or by force to prevent, hinder, or delay the execution of any law of the United States, or by force to seize, take, or possess any property of the United States contrary to the authority thereof, they shall each be fined or imprisoned not more than 20 years, or both.

This law was enacted in 1861 after secessionists gained control of most slaveholding states as the Confederate States of America, although it was originally sought by Senator Stephen A. Douglas in response to John Brown's 1859 raid on a federal arsenal. A substantially similar offense appeared in the Sedition Act of 1798 signed by President John Adams to suppress the Democratic-Republican Party's criticisms of the Quasi-War. However, the law was deeply unpopular and was allowed to expire after Thomas Jefferson defeated Adams in the 1800 presidential election. After Nat Turner's Rebellion, the Virginia General Assembly amended the state slave codes to enact charges similar to seditious conspiracy against slaves and free blacks who held unauthorized assemblies or led slave rebellions.

=== Notable cases ===
==== Puerto Rican nationalists ====
Puerto Rican nationalists seeking the island's independence from the United States have been charged and convicted on multiple occasions. In 1936, Pedro Albizu Campos and other leaders of the Puerto Rican Nationalist Party were prosecuted. Another seventeen members of the PRNP were charged after four of them carried out the 1954 Capitol shooting. In 1980, Puerto Rican Nationalist Carmen Valentín Pérez and nine others were charged, and were each given sentences of up to 90 years in prison.

==== Far-right groups ====
Seditious conspiracy charges have been brought several times against far-right groups. In 1940, the government arrested seventeen members of the Christian Front, followers of fascistic broadcaster Father Charles Coughlin. All of the charges ended in dismissal or acquittal. Edwin Walker, a former Army Major General, was arrested for seditious conspiracy and insurrection in 1962 after he incited a segregationist riot to prevent the admission of black student James Meredith at the University of Mississippi; the charges were dismissed. In the 1987 Fort Smith sedition trial, Louis Beam and nine other white supremacists were indicted for the activities of The Order and The Covenant, The Sword, and the Arm of the Lord. All ten defendants and four other defendants indicted for different crimes were acquitted in April 1988 after a two-month trial.

In 2010 the United States Department of Justice attempted to prosecute the Christian nationalist Hutaree militia of Lenawee County, Michigan, for seditious conspiracy. Judge Victoria A. Roberts of the United States District Court for the Eastern District of Michigan ordered the seditious conspiracy charges to be dismissed under First Amendment grounds.

==== January 6 attacks ====
Several members of American far-right militias were charged with seditious conspiracy for their participation in the January 6 United States Capitol attack, in which a mob of the outgoing President Donald Trump's supporters attacked the United States Capitol in an attempt to prevent the 2021 United States Electoral College vote count formally certifying his successor Joe Biden's victory in the 2020 United States presidential election.

Nine Oath Keepers were found guilty of seditious conspiracy to stop the presidential transition of Joe Biden.

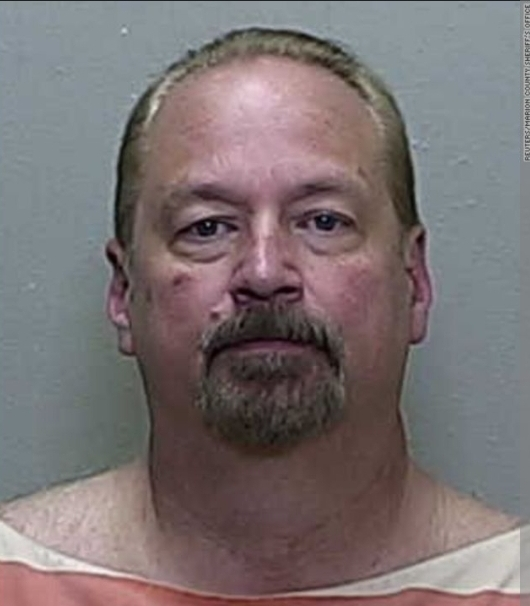
Kelly Meggs

- In May 2022, three Oath Keeper members — Joshua James, Brian Ulrich, and William Todd Wilson — pled guilty to this charge.
- In November 2022, leader Stewart Rhodes and Kelly Meggs, a leader in Florida, were convicted of this charge. Rhodes was later sentenced to 18 years and Meggs to 12 years.
- In January 2023, four more Oath Keepers — Roberto Minuta, Joseph Hackett, David Moerschel and Edward Vallejo — were convicted of this charge. Minuta was later sentenced to 54 months, Hackett to 42 months, Moerschel to 36 months, and Vallejo to 36 months. All four were sentenced to an additional 36 months of supervised release.

Three other Oath Keeper leaders were acquitted of the seditious conspiracy charge.

In June 2022, five Proud Boys leaders, including their former chairman Enrique Tarrio, were similarly charged. In October, a sixth Proud Boy leader pled guilty to seditious conspiracy, as well as a weapons charge, as part of a cooperation agreement. On May 4, 2023, Tarrio and three of the other Proud Boys leaders — Ethan Nordean, Joe Biggs, and Zachary Rehl — were found guilty of seditious conspiracy. On September 5, 2023, Tarrio was sentenced to 22 years in federal prison. During sentencing, stating the reasoning behind the lengthy sentence, Judge Timothy J. Kelly quoted the seditious conspiracy statute, stating that Tarrio committed a “serious offense” and that he was the "ultimate leader of that conspiracy...motivated by revolutionary zeal.”

U.S. Department of Justice prosecutors involved in the seditious conspiracy cases against the Proud Boys and the Oath Keepers attempted to block the defendants from blaming Trump in their defenses on the basis that he had no political authority to order such a conspiracy.

Upon Trump's inauguration on January 20, 2025, he commuted the sentences of six of the Oath Keepers (Rhodes, Meggs, Minuta, Vallejo, Moerschel, and Hackett) and three of the Proud Boys (Nordean, Biggs, Rehl) who had been convicted of seditious conspiracy. Three more Oath Keepers and two more Proud Boys who had been convicted of other charges also received commutations. Their sentences were commuted to "time served," allowing them to be released from prison immediately, but their convictions stood. Apart from these 14 commutations, everyone else convicted of offenses related to the Capitol attack, who by then numbered over a thousand, was granted "a full, complete and unconditional pardon".

After the public hearings of the United States House Select Committee on the January 6 Attack, some legal analysts and political commentators argued that enough evidence existed to indict Trump himself for seditious conspiracy either in connection with the attack or his attempts to overturn the 2020 United States presidential election in general. President Biden and certain special interest groups such as the National Association of Manufacturers had already previously accused Trump of sedition for his speech at the rally before the attack. Ultimately, however, while Trump was charged with four counts, seditious conspiracy was not among them.

==== Islamist terrorism ====
In 1995 Sheikh Omar Abdel-Rahman, a prominent Muslim cleric, and nine others were convicted of seditious conspiracy for planning to bomb New York City landmarks after the 1993 World Trade Center bombing.

In 1996, after his Declaration of War against the Americans Occupying the Land of the Two Holy Places stating al-Qaeda's intention to carry out terrorist attacks on the United States, the United States Attorney for the Southern District of New York allowed the Federal Bureau of Investigation to begin investigating Osama bin Laden under the charge of seditious conspiracy.

==== Others ====
The government charged three members of the Buffalo, New York-based El Ariete Society, a communist group, in 1920. The defendants were acquitted by a judge as the government failed to prove that the defendants had any connection with the seditious publications that were presented as evidence, or that any active conspiracy had existed.

Three members of the United Freedom Front, a Marxist group, were convicted in 1989 for a series of attacks against corporate, government, and military targets.

== See also ==
- List of conspiracies (political)
- Sedition
- U.S. Justice Department's list of rioters charged with seditious conspiracy for the January 6, 2021 attack.
