= Joe Biggs =

American seditionist (born 1980s)

Joseph Randall Biggs
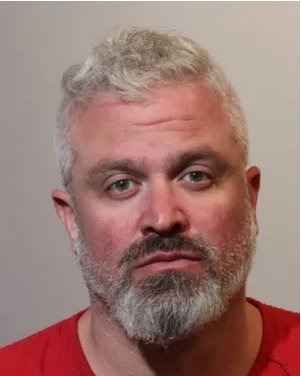
- Biggs' 2021 mug shot
- Born: 1983/1984 (age 42–43); Charlotte, North Carolina, United States
- Occupations: Soldier; correspondent
- Employers: Infowars; Censored.TV
- Organization: Proud Boys
- Known for: January 6 Capitol attack
- Criminal charges: Seditious conspiracy; Obstructing Congress; and conspiracy thereto; Interference with police; and conspiracy thereto; Destroying gov't property
- Criminal penalty: 17-year prison sentence commuted to 1.39 years
- Criminal status: Released from prison on January 20, 2025
- Military career
- Branch: United States Army
- Rank: Sergeant
- Awards: Purple Heart

Joseph Randall Biggs (born 1983/1984) is an American veteran, media personality, organizer of the Proud Boys, and convicted seditionist who participated in the January 6 United States Capitol attack.

After serving in the United States Army and suffering a traumatic brain injury, Biggs began working for various conservative media organizations, including Infowars and Censored.TV. As a leader for the far-right Proud Boys group, he organized and promoted the End Domestic Terrorism rally; was found jointly culpable for an over-$1 million judgment for trespass and vandalism at the Metropolitan African Methodist Episcopal Church; and helped lead the organization's destructive efforts in the attack on the United States Capitol.

For the last of these, in 2023, he was found guilty on six criminal counts (including seditious conspiracy), and sentenced to 17 years in federal prison. He served 1.39 years before his sentence was commuted by President Trump on January 20, 2025.

== Personal life ==
Joseph Randall Biggs was born in Charlotte, North Carolina, in 1983 or 1984. As of March 2021, he lived in Ormond Beach, Florida, and upon his 2023 trial, had at least one daughter.

In the 2010s, Biggs was arrested in Austin, Texas, for assaulting a peace officer while drunk, but a grand jury did not return an indictment. On social media, Biggs has repeatedly posted homophobic, transphobic, and misogynistic content since at least spring 2012; his Twitter and Facebook accounts were suspended for posting threatening messages.

== Career ==
=== Military ===
Biggs is a combat veteran of the United States Army. He suffered a traumatic brain injury during a deployment to Iraq, for which he received a Purple Heart. As reported by Salon, Michael Hastings' book The Operators corroborates Biggs' service in Afghanistan as well as the sergeant's involvement "in a gruesome suicide-bombing incident". In 2007, he was stationed at Fort Bragg when arrested for domestic violence. Biggs claimed his separation from the Army was a medical retirement after eight years enlisted.

=== Media ===
He also worked as a correspondent for Infowars, where he covered the Oath Keepers' actions at the 2015 Ferguson unrest, the 2016 occupation of the Malheur National Wildlife Refuge, conspiracy theories about the 2015 San Bernardino attack, and the Pizzagate conspiracy theory.

In January 2017, Biggs posted online that he had been hired by Right Side Broadcasting Network (RSBN; "the unofficial version of Trump TV") to make a program focusing on the Second Amendment to the United States Constitution; RSBN refuted that in April, saying they were merely speaking with Biggs and "are anything but racist or sexist here."

In August 2017, Biggs was a speaker at the Boston Free Speech Rally; by 2019, he was the host of a right-wing talk radio show. In September 2020, Biggs was employed by Censored.TV, though his show had been removed by late January 2021.

== Proud Boys ==
By 2019, Joseph Biggs was an organizer of the Proud Boys, a neofascist "far-right, all-male group of self-described 'Western chauvinists'" which the Southern Poverty Law Center has classified as a hate group.

Biggs was an organizer and the main promoter of August 2019's End Domestic Terrorism rally in Portland, Oregon. In the wake of that event, in response to Biggs' threat to return with the Proud Boys on a monthly basis, Portland Mayor Ted Wheeler chastized Biggs "for frightening Portlanders with the prospect of violence in the streets", and told the Floridian he was not welcome in Portland.

Biggs' lawyer—J. Daniel Hull—alleged that in late July 2020, the Federal Bureau of Investigation approached his client and enlisted his assistance collecting on-the-ground intelligence about antifa activists.

At the September 29, 2020 presidential debate between Donald Trump and Joe Biden, when pressured to condemn the Proud Boys as a white supremacy group, the president said, "Proud Boys, stand back and stand by". The next day, Biggs filed a police report with the Volusia County sheriff's office, alleging receipt of threatening phone calls and social-media messages, and requesting police protection. His identity in connection with the report was obfuscated under Marsy's Law.

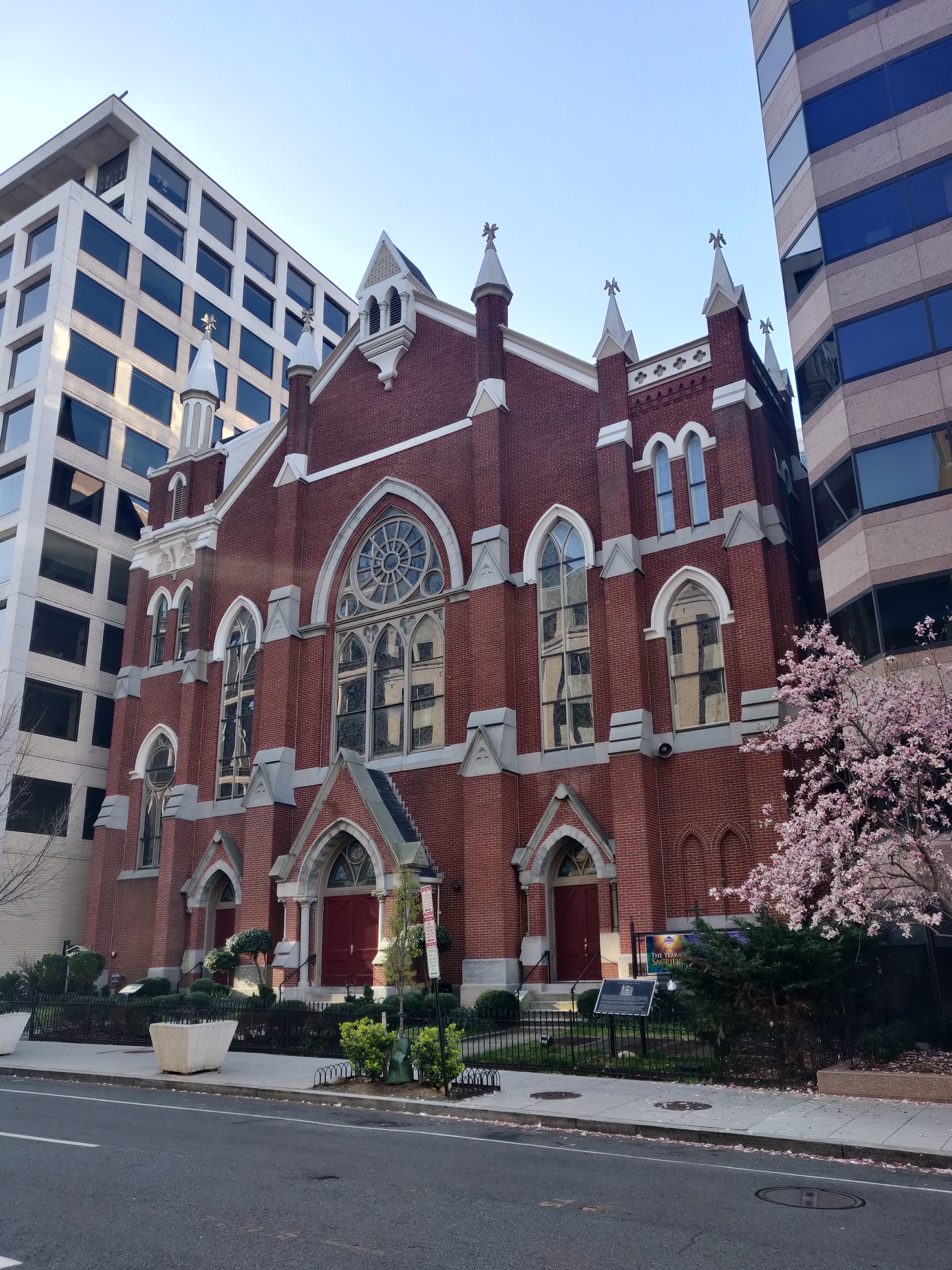
The Metropolitan African Methodist Episcopal Church in Washington, D.C.

On December 12, 2020, Proud Boys trespassed the Metropolitan African Methodist Episcopal Church in Washington, D.C., destroyed church property, and then celebrated the same. The church filed a lawsuit for compensatory damages against the Proud Boys' limited liability corporation, and specifically named Biggs, Jeremy Bertino, Enrique Tarrio, and John Turano. On June 30, 2023, Judge Neal E. Kravitz of the Superior Court of the District of Columbia issued a default judgment against the defendants for over one million dollars.

=== Capitol attack ===
==== Planning and participation ====
In 2021, prior to the January 6 United States Capitol attack that delayed the certification of Joe Biden's presidential-election win, Biggs exhorted for Proud Boys to "turn out in record numbers [...] We will be blending in as one of you ... We are going to smell like you, move like you, and look like you. The only thing we'll do that's us is think like us!" On January 5, via encrypted social media channels, he communicated with other members: "trying to get our numbers. So we can plan accordingly for tonight and go over tomorrow's plan. [...] info should be coming out [...] we have a plan".

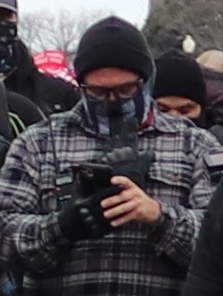
Biggs marching by the United States Supreme Court Building

Outside the Capitol Building, Biggs spoke privately with Ryan Samsel, who immediately thereafter was the first person to breach the security perimeter. Biggs was one of the first to breach the building itself at about 2:13 p.m., 20 seconds behind Dominic Pezzola, who smashed a Senate window with a riot shield; he was identified by the FBI via photos and videos taken there. Biggs and other Proud Boys were wearing walkie-talkies to allow real-time communication, and Biggs was recorded on video saying of the breach, "This is awesome!" He later left the building, but returned 30 minutes later alongside some Oath Keepers, pushing their way past a law enforcement officer.

U.S. Capitol Police Officer Caroline Edwards testified during the Jan. 6 Committee hearings in 2022 that it was Biggs who started "turning the tables" on a handful of police officers and as they faced off with a crowd of Proud Boys and others on Jan. 6, 2021. She said Biggs, using a megaphone, led the rioters in the face off with police at a bike rack at the Peace Circle.

— The Daytona Beach News-Journal

==== Legal repercussions ====
On January 18, Biggs admitted to the FBI that he entered the building, but claimed he neither forced his way in, nor knew about the plan to do so. On the morning of January 20, 2021, he was arrested in Florida, charged with knowingly entering a restricted building without lawful authority; obstructing, influencing, or impeding an official proceeding; and willfully and knowingly engaging in disorderly conduct to impede a session of Congress. In Orlando court, Biggs did not enter a plea; magistrate judge Embry Kidd released him to home detention with an unsecured bond of US$25,000 (equivalent to about $30,000 in 2025), pending his trial in Washington, D.C.

Biggs and three other Proud Boys leaders (Charles Donohoe, Ethan Nordean, and Zachary Rehl) were indicted (United States of America v. Ethan Nordean, Joseph Biggs, Zachary Rehl, and Charles Donohoe) on March 10, 2021, charged with planning and executing the Capitol attack. On March 20, and based on these new charges, federal prosecutors requested Biggs return to pre-trial detention. Hull attempted to leverage Biggs' alleged prior cooperation with the FBI to keep his client out on bail. Judge Timothy J. Kelly revoked his bail that April, saying, "The defendants stand charged with seeking to steal one of the crown jewels of our country, in a sense, by interfering with the peaceful transfer of power. [...] It's no exaggeration to say the rule of law and ... in the end, the existence of our constitutional republic is threatened by it." In July 2021, Hull complained to Kelly that Biggs' time in the Seminole County, Florida jail was subjecting his Proud Boys client to threats of violence, exacerbating his medical problems, and complicating their defense prep due to a lack of technology.

On June 6, 2022, a superseding grand jury indictment (United States of America v. Ethan Nordean, Joseph Biggs, Zachary Rehl, Enrique Tarrio, and Dominic Pezzola) was issued by the United States Attorney for the District of Columbia, Matthew M. Graves. In addition to Hull, at the D.C. jury trial, Biggs was also represented by the Connecticut-based Norm Pattis, who was briefly removed from the case when his law license was suspended due to mishandling confidential documents in Alex Jones' trial for defamation.

On May 4, 2023, after the three-month trial in D.C., Biggs was found guilty of seditious conspiracy; obstructing an official proceeding and criminal conspiracy thereto; conspiracy to prevent an officer from discharging any duties; interference with law enforcement during civil disorder; and destruction of government property. Judge Kelly ruled that Biggs' destruction of a fence separating rioters and police qualified the defendant for "a terrorism sentencing enhancement sought by prosecutors", who asked for a 33-year sentence. Prior to sentencing, Biggs apologized to the court, blaming his actions on personal and familial difficulties, and conceded that "I know that I have to be punished and I understand". On August 31, Kelly sentenced Biggs to 17 years of federal imprisonment.

Two days later, Biggs told Alex Jones that his veteran's pension had been revoked, and that if Donald Trump was successful in the 2024 presidential election, "I know he'll pardon me. I believe that with all my heart". On CNN Republican Town Hall with Donald Trump, the former president said that he—if elected—would look into pardoning a "'large portion' of the Capitol riot defendants." In the run up to Ohio's Republican primary for the 2024 US Senate election, incumbent senator JD Vance was trying to redefine the extent of the Capitol attack, saying that Biggs and the other men who destroyed barricades, led the intruders, and attacked Capitol officers were sentenced too harshly in comparison to other criminals. On January 20, 2025, President Trump instead commuted Biggs' sentence, effective immediately; he was released from federal prison that same day (having previously been scheduled for release on December 7, 2035).

On April 14, 2026, the United States Attorney for the District of Columbia, Jeanine Pirro, asked the United States Court of Appeals for the District of Columbia Circuit to vacate the seditious conspiracy convictions connected to the January 6 attack on the US Capitol (United States of America v. Ethan Nordean, et al.), allowing the federal government under the second Trump administration to dismiss the indictments with prejudice; this would include Biggs' conviction.

== Post-incarceration ==
In the months after his release from prison, Biggs was living in Ormond-by-the-Sea, Florida. In an interview with USA Today, Biggs "unequivocally" said that he would again commit the acts for which he was tried and convicted. He also told the paper that he wanted to pursue prison reform, by working to free "people unjustly imprisoned by the federal justice system", with the help of Kim Kardashian.

== See also ==
- List of cases of the January 6 United States Capitol attack (A-F)
- Criminal proceedings in the January 6 United States Capitol attack – List of people charged with crimes
- List of people granted executive clemency in the second Trump presidency
