= Jeremy Bertino =

American seditionist

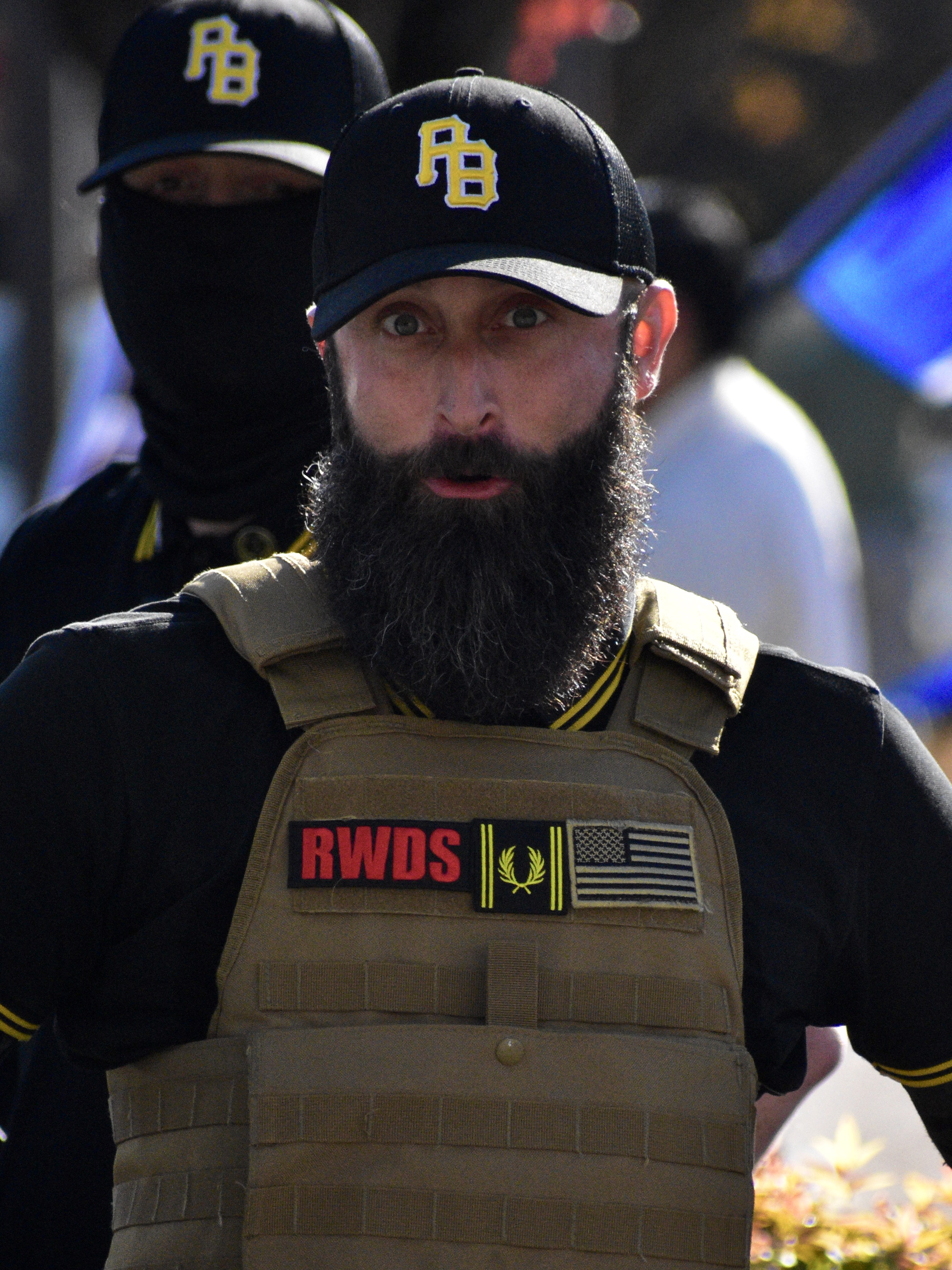
- Bertino in 2020
- Born: 1979 or 1980 (age 46–47)
- Organization: Proud Boys
- Known for: Seditious conspiracy, Proud Boys' leadership, court testimony

Jeremy Bertino (born 1979 or 1980) is an American convicted seditionist and a former member of the Proud Boys who testified against Enrique Tarrio during his trial for seditious conspiracy for his role in the 2021 United States Capitol attack. Bertino was the first Proud Boys member to plead guilty to the same charge. On January 20, 2025, President Donald Trump commuted his sentence to time served. However, when the United States Department of Justice moved on April 14, 2026, to dismiss the convictions of Bertino's associates, it excluded Bertino.

== Early life ==
Bertino was born 1979 or 1980. In 2004, he was found guilty of reckless endangerment and briefly was jailed in New York State and sentenced to five years of probation. He later lived in Belmont, North Carolina.

== Involvement in Proud Boys ==
Bertino joined the Proud Boys in 2018 and was briefly (2.5 months) the Vice President of a local South Carolina chapter. As a Proud Boys member, he did a media interview in 2021.

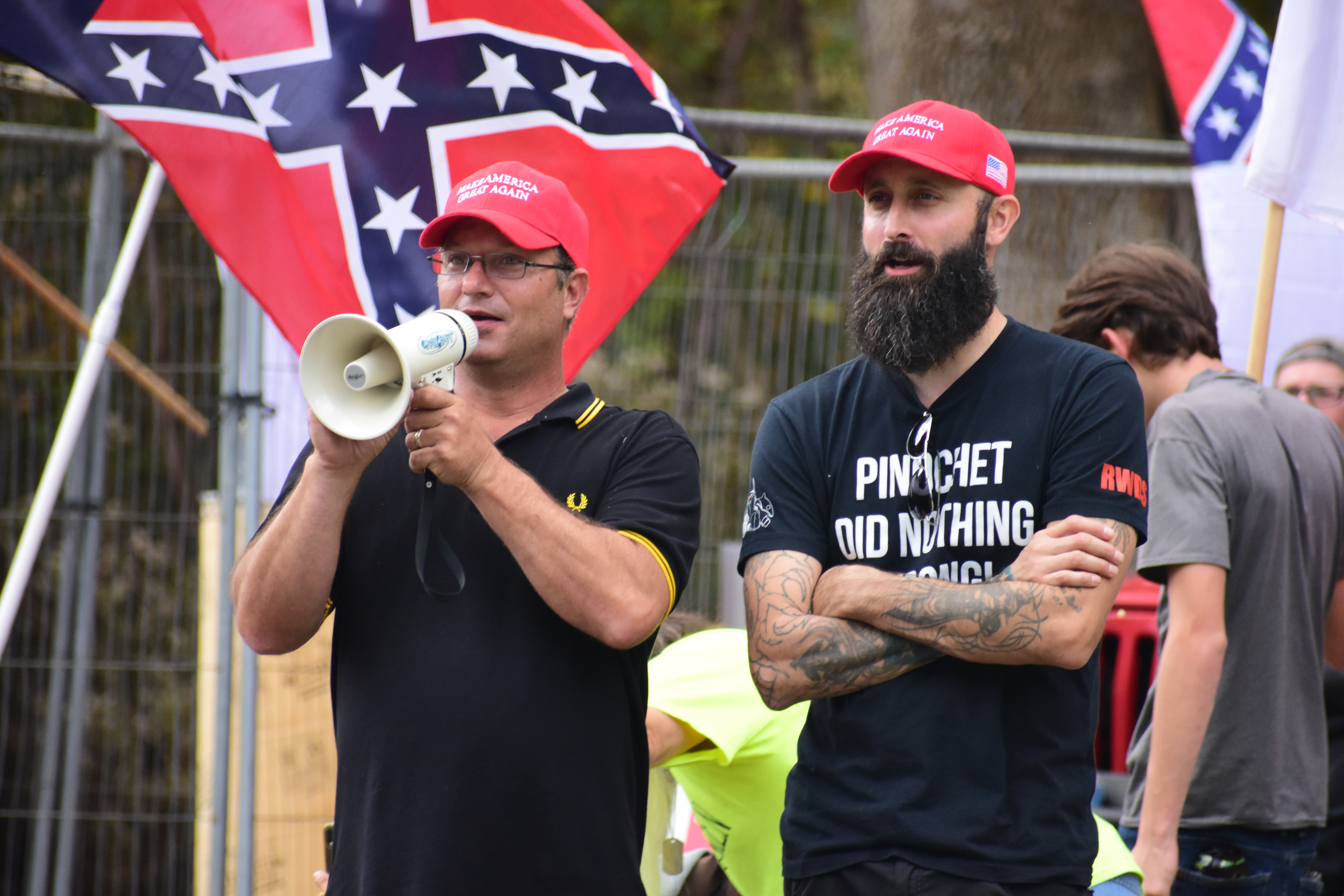
Bertino in Pittsboro, North Carolina, 2019

Bertino did not attend the January 6, 2021, riot due to a stabbing injury that he received on December 12, 2020, at a rally in Washington, D.C., supporting Donald Trump; on that day, Bertino, along with other Proud Boys and far-right activists, attacked the Metropolitan African Methodist Episcopal Church. He used digital communications to support the insurrectionists on January 6.

At his criminal trial after the riot, Bertino pleaded guilty to seditious conspiracy and later agreed to be a witness against other members of the Proud Boys. He also pleaded guilty to unlawfully being a felon in possession of a firearm. after two AR-15 style rifles, two pistols, a shotgun, and a rifle were confiscated from his home by the FBI. At the time of his plea, he was the first Proud Boys member to plead guilty to seditious conspiracy. While testifying against Proud Boys members, including group leader Enrique Tarrio, Bertino stated that efforts to overthrow the U.S. government on January 6 failed due to the intervention of Capitol Police.

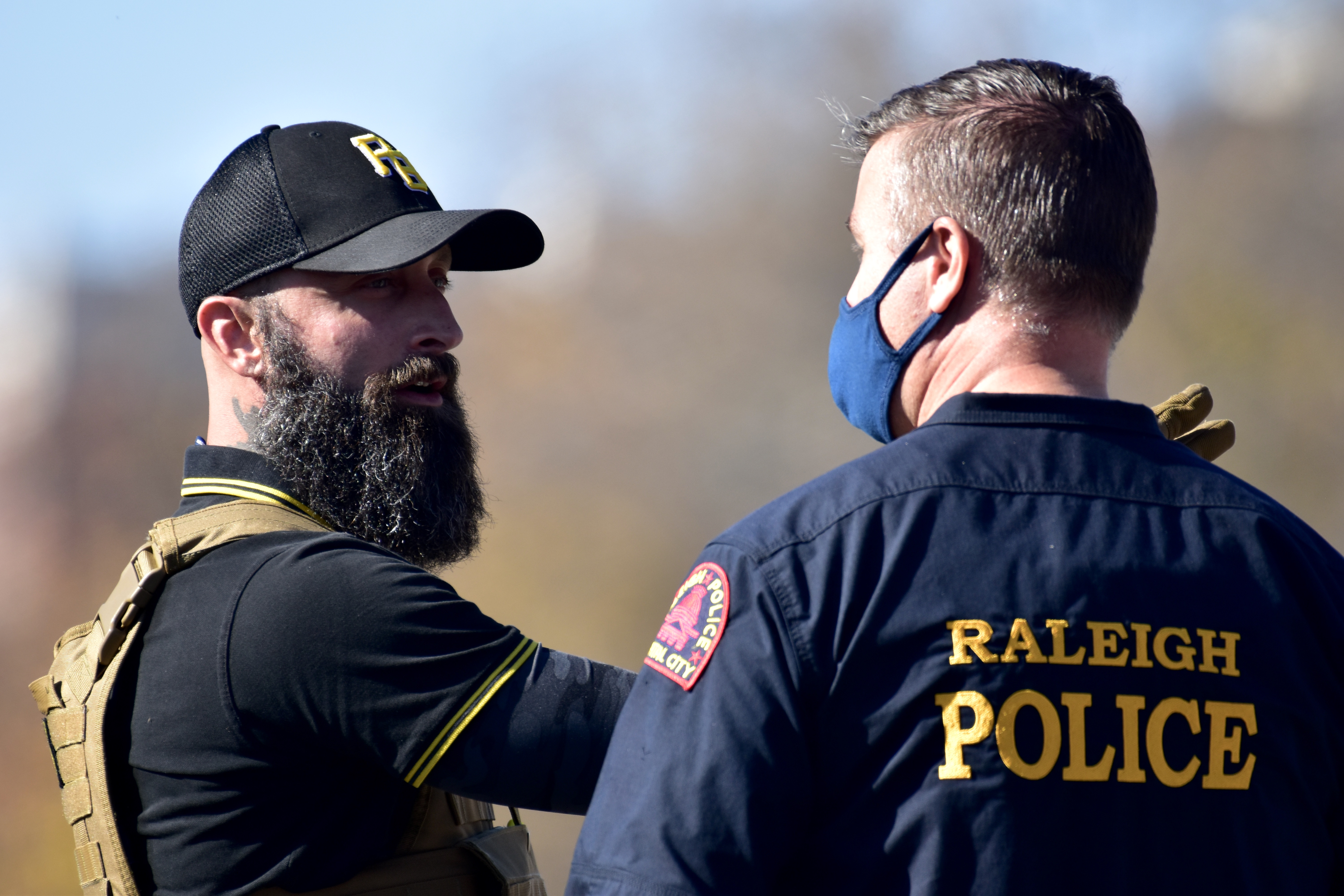
Bertino in Raleigh, North Carolina, 2020

In May 2023, Bertino spoke of his regret about wearing a Right Wing Death Squad patch, the same patch worn by the perpetrator of the 2023 Allen, Texas outlet mall shooting who killed eight people.

In June 2023, District of Columbia Superior Court judge Neal E. Kravitz imposed civil penalties of over $1 million on Bertino and three others, Enrique Tarrio, Joe Biggs and John Turano in connection with the 2020 attack on the Metropolitan African Methodist Episcopal Church. Kravitz said that the four men had engaged in "hateful and overtly racist conduct".

== See also ==
- List of cases of the January 6 United States Capitol attack (A-F)
- Criminal proceedings in the January 6 United States Capitol attack
- List of people granted executive clemency in the second Trump presidency
