= Enrique Tarrio =

American far-right activist and seditionist (born 1984)

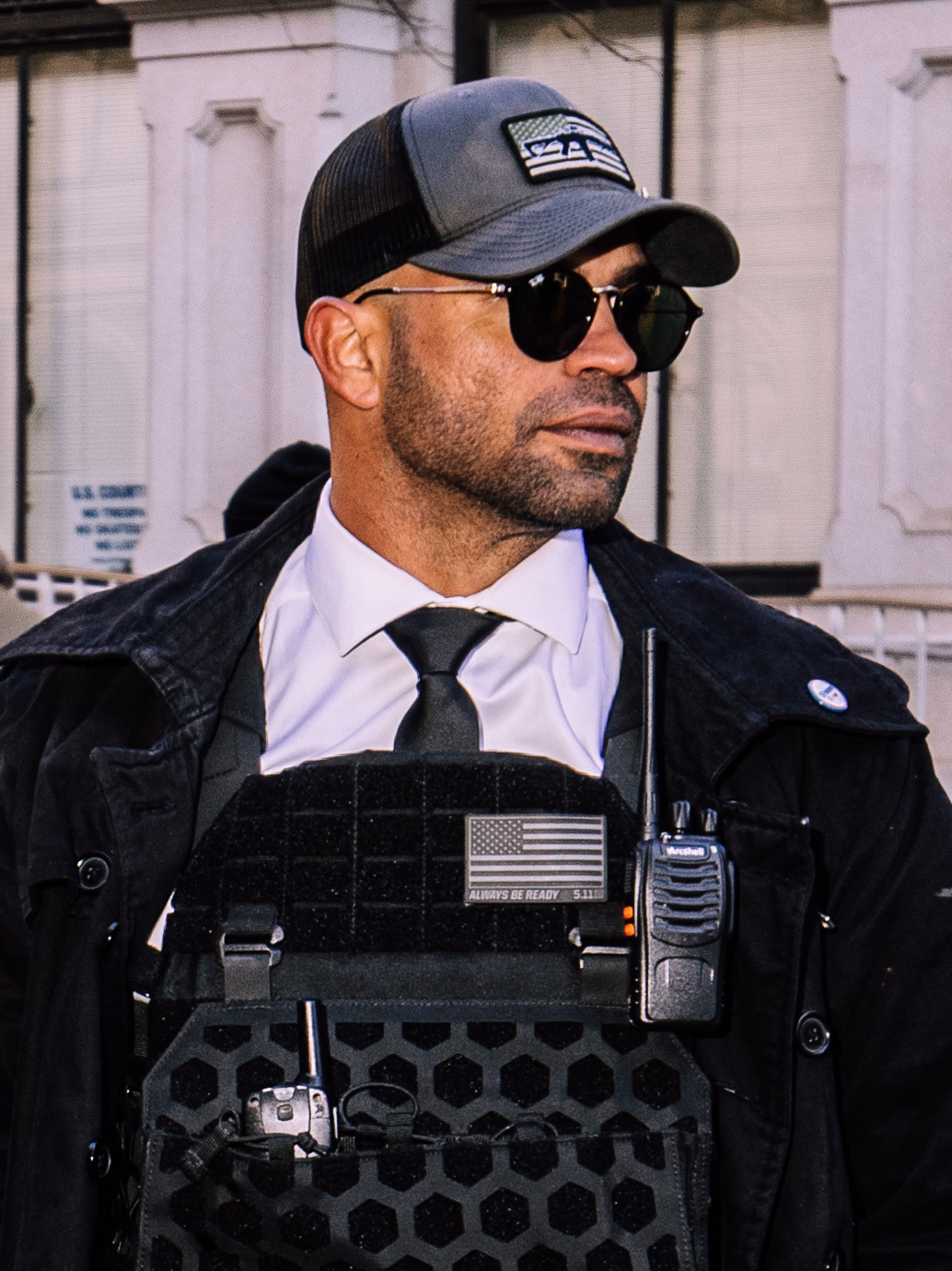
- Tarrio at a rally in 2020
- Born: Henry Tarrio; 1983 or 1984 (age 41–42); Miami, Florida, U.S.
- Known for: January 6 Capitol attack, Chairman of the Proud Boys, Florida state director of Latinos for Trump
- Political party: Republican
- Movement: Proud Boys
- Status: Pardoned
- Convictions: Seditious conspiracy; Obstruction of Congress; Obstruction of law enforcement; Conspiracy (2 counts)
- Penalty: 22 years imprisonment

Henry "Enrique" Tarrio (Note: (US English: /ˈtɑːrioʊ/ TAR-ee-oh; US Spanish: [taˈri.o]) (born 1983 or 1984) is an American far-right activist and convicted seditionist. From 2018 to 2021, he was the chairman of the Proud Boys, a neo-fascist organization that promotes and engages in political violence in the United States. Along with three other Proud Boys leaders, Tarrio was convicted in May 2023 of seditious conspiracy for his role in the 2021 United States Capitol attack. In September 2023, Tarrio was sentenced to 22 years in prison, before being pardoned by U.S. president Donald Trump following his return to office on January 20, 2025.

Tarrio, who is Afro-Cuban, was the Florida state director of the grassroots organization Latinos for Trump. In 2020, Tarrio was a candidate in the Republican primary election for Florida's 27th congressional district, but withdrew. According to a former federal prosecutor and the transcripts of a 2014 federal court proceeding, Tarrio had served as an informant to both federal and local law enforcement from 2012 to 2014.

== Life before Proud Boys ==
Henry Tarrio was born in Miami, Florida, in 1983 or 1984 to Cuban immigrants, and was raised Catholic in the neighborhood of Little Havana.

In 2004, when he was 20 years old, Tarrio was convicted of theft. He was sentenced to community service and three years of probation and was ordered to pay restitution. After 2004, Tarrio relocated to a small town in North Florida to run a poultry farm. He later returned to Miami. He has also founded a security equipment installation firm and another firm providing GPS tracking for companies.

In 2012, Tarrio was indicted for his role in a scheme to rebrand and resell stolen diabetic test strips. After being charged, Tarrio cooperated with investigators, helping them prosecute more than a dozen others. In 2013, Tarrio was sentenced to 30 months (of which he served 16) in federal prison.

Between 2012 and 2014, Tarrio was an informant to both federal and local law enforcement; in a 2014 federal court hearing, Tarrio's lawyer said that Tarrio had been a "prolific" cooperator who had assisted the government in the investigation and prosecution of more than twelve people in cases involving anabolic steroids, gambling, and human smuggling; had helped identify three "grow houses" where marijuana was cultivated; and had repeatedly worked undercover to aid in investigations. Tarrio denied working undercover or cooperating with prosecutions, but the court transcript contradicted the denial, and the former federal prosecutor in the proceeding against Tarrio confirmed that he cooperated. Tarrio's role as an informant was first made public in January 2021, after Reuters obtained the court records and interviewed investigators and lawyers involved in the case.

== Proud Boys ==
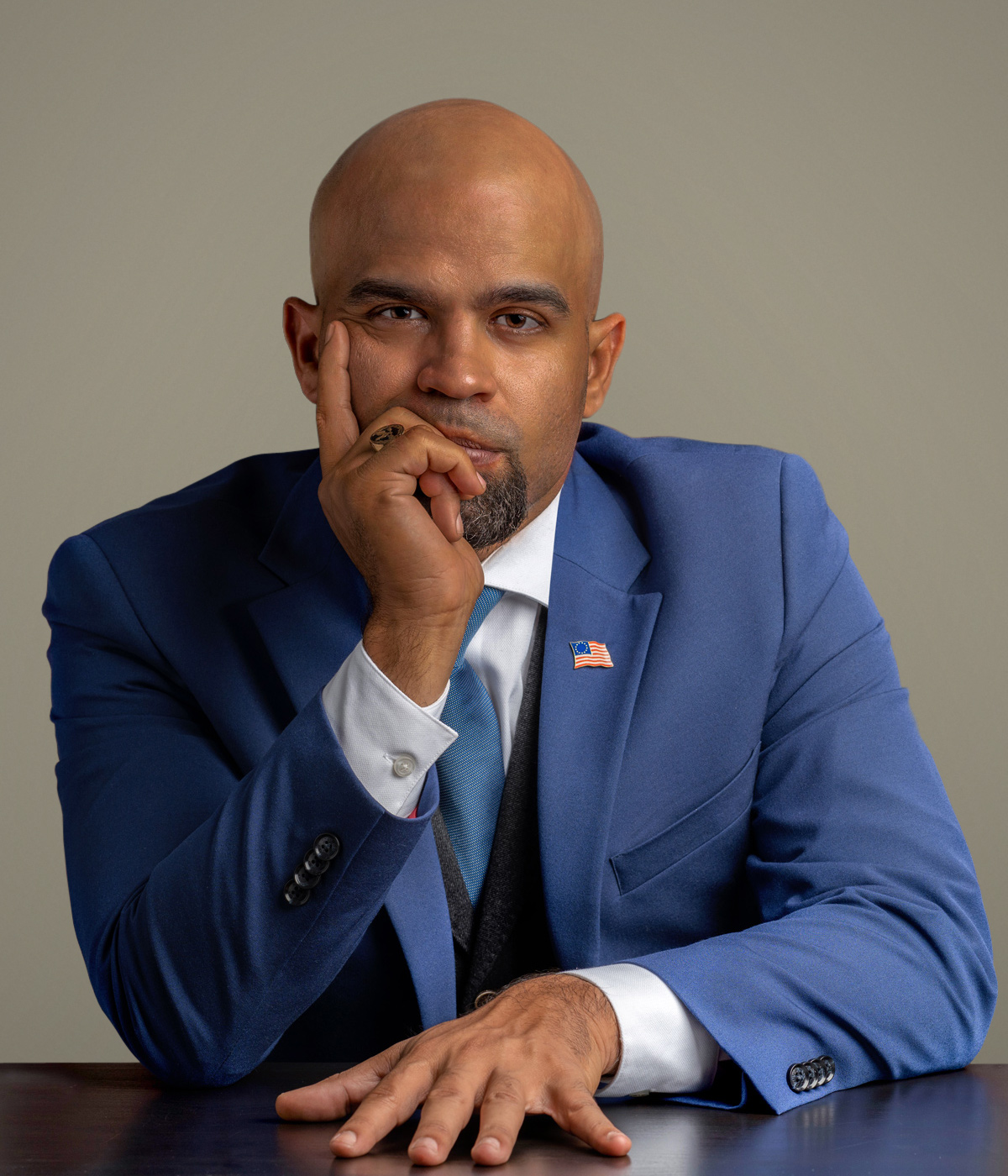
Tarrio in 2019

Tarrio volunteered at a Miami event for far-right commentator Milo Yiannopoulos in May 2017 when he encountered a member of the Proud Boys, who encouraged him to join the organization. In August 2017, Tarrio attended the Unite the Right rally in Charlottesville, Virginia. He said he was there to protest the removal of Confederate monuments and memorials.

In 2018, Tarrio became a fourth-degree member of the Proud Boys, a distinction reserved for those who get into a physical altercation "for the cause"; he punched a person who was believed to be aligned with antifa. He assumed the role of chairman for the organization on November 29, 2018, succeeding Jason Lee Van Dyke, who held the position for two days, and Van Dyke's predecessor Gavin McInnes. McInnes involved Tarrio as a prospective electoral candidate, and in that capacity both conferred with Trump right-wing confidants Steve Bannon (whom Trump later pardoned) and Sebastian Gorka.

Tarrio helped organize the End Domestic Terrorism rally held in Portland, Oregon, on August 17, 2019. The event, co-organized by Joe Biggs, was advertised as a response to the June 2019 beating up of conservative blogger Andy Ngo.

In addition to his role with the Proud Boys, Tarrio owns a Miami T-shirt business, known as the 1776 Shop, an online vendor for right-wing merchandise. Slate described the 1776 Shop as a "freewheeling online emporium for far-right merch" that sells a range of Proud Boys gear including shirts stating "Pinochet did nothing wrong".

In regard to his views on extremist groups and ideologies, Tarrio has been quoted as saying, "I denounce white supremacy. I denounce anti-Semitism. I denounce racism. I denounce fascism. I denounce communism and any other -ism that is prejudiced towards people because of their race, religion, culture, tone of skin." In regard to his own ethnicity, he has said, "I'm pretty brown, I'm Cuban. There's nothing white supremacist about me." The Anti-Defamation League considers the Proud Boys to be misogynistic, Islamophobic, transphobic and anti-immigration, and goes on to state that some members support white supremacist and antisemitic ideologies, and engage with white supremacist groups.

After Tarrio confronted and shouted expletives at House Speaker Nancy Pelosi in Coral Gables in late 2018, the chairman of the Miami-Dade Republican Party apologized and US Senator Marco Rubio compared the disruptors to the "repudiation mobs Castro has long ago used in Cuba."

In 2018, Twitter removed Tarrio's account, along with others related to the Proud Boys, citing how platform policy prohibited accounts related to violent extremist groups. The following year, Twitter detected and removed another account that Tarrio created to evade the suspension.

Tarrio said he is a close friend of Roger Stone, a Trump ally who is a high-profile Proud Boys supporter. After Stone was arrested in January 2019, Tarrio appeared outside the courtroom in a shirt emblazoned with the message "Roger Stone did nothing wrong". The two appeared in a video together made on December 11, 2020, the day before a "Stop the Steal" rally where Tarrio stood on stage with Stone. On December 23, 2020, Trump pardoned Stone, whose prison sentence he had previously commuted.

Tarrio began a run for Congress for Florida's 27th district in 2020, but withdrew before the Republican Party primary. In his campaign's responses to a Ballotpedia survey done in 2019, Tarrio listed criminal justice reform, protection of the Second Amendment, countering domestic terrorism, ending the war on drugs, free speech on digital platforms, and immigration reform among his priorities.

=== December 2020 clashes and 2021 guilty plea ===
On December 12, 2020, after Donald Trump was defeated in the November 2020 election, Tarrio and the Proud Boys, along with other far-right groups, marched in Washington, D.C. to support Trump's campaign to delegitimize his election loss. About 200 Proud Boys, many clad in combat fatigues, ballistic vests, and helmets, took part. Tarrio and the group set fire to a "Black Lives Matter" banner they seized from Asbury United Methodist Church, a historic Black church. Asbury United Methodist, along with three other churches, were vandalized that night, and more than three dozen people were arrested. Tarrio was among a group of Proud Boys and far-right activists who also attacked the Metropolitan African Methodist Episcopal Church in Washington, DC that day.

Trump supporters and opponents clashed in the streets, culminating in the stabbing of four people. After a warrant was issued for his arrest, Tarrio was arrested by D.C. police on January 4, two days before the January 6 insurrection. The FBI later said they had arrested Tarrio in an attempt to prevent the 2021 United States Capitol attack.

Tarrio was charged with misdemeanor destruction of property and with two counts of felony possession of illegal high-capacity ammunition magazines (which police discovered upon arresting Tarrio on January 4). He was released on bail on January 5, 2021, with conditions; Tarrio was banned from entering Washington except for trial or meeting with his lawyers.

In July 2021, as part of a plea agreement with prosecutors, Tarrio pleaded guilty to destruction of property and to a misdemeanor count of attempted possession of a high-capacity magazine (the felony counts were dropped as part of the agreement). Tarrio acknowledged that he had burned the banner, but denied that the act was a hate crime. At the sentencing hearing in August 2021, Tarrio said he made a "grave mistake" and wanted to "profusely apologize for my actions." The D.C. Superior Court judge found that Tarrio's claim that he did not fully realize what he was doing was "not credible" and that video evidence contradicted some of Tarrio's claims. Tarrio was sentenced to 155 days in the D.C. Jail, more than the 90 days requested by federal prosecutors. Tarrio began serving his sentence on September 6, 2021. His November 2021 request for early release based on poor living conditions in the D.C. Jail was denied. Tarrio was released from the D.C. jail in January 2022, after serving four months and a week.

The Metropolitan AME Church, one of the historically Black congregations attacked in December 2020, sued Tarrio and the Texas-based Proud Boys International LLC. Represented by the Lawyers' Committee for Civil Rights Under Law and the law firm Paul Weiss, the church brought claims of civil conspiracy, defacement of private property, trespass, and destruction of religious property under the D.C. Bias and Related Crimes Act. The Proud Boys failed to respond to the suit, and the plaintiffs won a default judgment in April 2021.

In June 2023, D.C. Superior Court Judge Neal E. Kravitz approved the default judgment and ordered Tarrio and three others, Joe Biggs, Jeremy Bertino, and John Turano, to pay $36,626.78 in compensatory damages and $1 million in punitive damages. Kravitz wrote in his order that the four men had engaged in "hateful and overtly racist conduct" and that the tearing down of the sign "resulted from a highly orchestrated set of events focused on the Proud Boys' guiding principles: white supremacy and violence."

=== Role in the January 6 attack ===
By November 2021, at least two dozen Proud Boys members and affiliates had been indicted for alleged roles in the 2021 United States Capitol attack. After the assault on the Capitol, Tarrio said he would neither "support" nor "condemn" the attack and did not "sympathize" with lawmakers. By January 2022, at least 37 members of the Proud Boys were arrested and charged with January 6-related offenses. Tarrio and the Proud Boys were subpoenaed by the House Select Committee on the January 6 Attack in November 2021. In February 2022, under subpoena, Tarrio gave a deposition to committee investigators and two committee members.

== Split within Proud Boys after January 6 ==
In the aftermath of the 2021 United States Capitol attack, several chapters of the Proud Boys organization split with the national group. The revelation in late January 2021 that Tarrio had been an informant to federal and local law enforcement between 2012 and 2014 contributed to rifts within the group. The revelation that some Proud Boys had turned into FBI informants also led members to panic. The Proud Boys' decline was also attributed to financial troubles. In June 2021, Tarrio said that the Proud Boys had been "hemorrhaging money" since January 2021.

After the January 6 attack, the Proud Boys were cut off from the financial systems: payment processors PayPal and Stripe banned the Proud Boys, and the livestreaming service DLive also banned Tarrio and other group members. Tarrio said that more than a dozen processors had banned him, and his business account was closed by his bank.

Local Proud Boys chapters in Seattle, Las Vegas, Indiana and Alabama left the national organization. The Oklahoma chapter also split from the national group. In late June 2021, Tarrio said in an interview that he would step down as national chairman of the Proud Boys in September 2021. He denied that his departure was related to splits in the movement, claiming that he was leaving to get more Proud Boys in Republican Party offices or local government seats and that he wanted to focus on the Florida chapter. At the time, Tarrio insisted the group had some 30,000 members nationwide, although he could not provide evidence to support the claim.

== Trial, conviction, and pardon for seditious conspiracy ==
Tarrio was indicted in D.C. federal court on a conspiracy charge by the Justice Department for his involvement in organizing the January 6 attack in March 2022. Tarrio was detained pending trial. In June 2022, a federal grand jury indicted Tarrio and four other top Proud Boys lieutenants on more serious seditious conspiracy charges.

Jury selection for the trial of Tarrio and four co-defendants (Ethan Nordean, Joseph Biggs, Zachary Rehl, and Dominic Pezzola) began on December 19, 2022, after US District Judge Timothy J. Kelly denied defense attorneys' last-minute bid for a delay. Opening statements were made on January 12, 2023. The trial was slowed as Tarrio's counsel clashed with the judge; Judge Kelly denied at least 10 requests from Tarrio's legal team for a mistrial.

The trial lasted more than three months and featured dozens of witnesses. Evidence introduced at trial against Tarrio and his co-defendants included videos, thousands of messages on encrypted group chats among Proud Boys leadership, as well as public messages on Parler, from both before and on January 6. Tarrio had convened a "Ministry of Self Defense" (or "MOSD") to coordinate Proud Boys leadership on January 6. The chats showed that Tarrio, stationed in a Baltimore hotel room, encouraged the Proud Boys as they attacked the Capitol. Having been barred from D.C. by a judge, Tarrio was not in D.C. during the attack.

On January 6, Tarrio told his followers on social media, "Do what must be done"; later, in an encrypted group chat, he directed other Proud Boys to "Do it again." In another message, Tarrio wrote, "Make no mistake. We did this." Prosecutors also introduced evidence that Tarrio had discussed with associates a plan to have a large crowd in Washington storm government buildings, a scheme that the Proud Boys dubbed "1776 Returns", in which "The Winter Palace" was used as apparent code for the US Capitol.

Tarrio chose not to take the stand to testify in his own defense. A key prosecution witness was former Proud Boy Jeremy Bertino, a former lieutenant of Tarrio who after the January 6 attack pleaded guilty to seditious conspiracy and cooperated with the government. On the stand, Bertino implicated Tarrio and his codefendants in the conspiracy, testifying that their objective was to subvert the election results.

In its closing argument, the prosecutors said that the evidence showed that the Proud Boys viewed themselves as "Trump's army"; were "willing to commit violence on his behalf"; and were committed to "all-out war" to keep Trump in power and to stop Biden from taking office. The defendants' lawyers sought to depict the Proud Boys as merely a glorified "drinking club", and Tarrio's lawyers sought to shift responsibility to Trump himself. On May 4, 2023, the jury issued its verdict, finding Tarrio, Nordean, Biggs, and Rehl guilty of seditious conspiracy.

Tarrio was also convicted of obstruction of Congress (for interfering with Congress's counting of the electoral votes); of obstructing law enforcement; and of two additional counts of conspiracy. Pezzola was acquitted of seditious conspiracy but convicted of other felonies. Tarrio and his Proud Boys lieutenants were the second group of far-right leaders convicted of seditious conspiracy in connection with the January 6 insurrection; Oath Keepers founder Stewart Rhodes and his deputy Kelly Meggs were convicted of the same offense the previous year.

On September 5, 2023, Tarrio was sentenced to 22 years in prison, the longest handed to a January 6 offender. Tarrio's sentence included a terrorism enhancement, indicating Tarrio's actions influenced "the conduct of government by intimidation and coercion". Before he was sentenced, Tarrio begged the judge, "Please show me mercy, I ask you that you not take my 40s from me."

Tarrio was incarcerated for less than two years at the Federal Correctional Institution in Pollock, Louisiana. Originally scheduled for release in 2040, he was pardoned by President Trump on January 20, 2025, and returned to his home in Miami two days later. He said on a podcast that he wanted "retribution" against those responsible for his incarceration. When USA Today asked him to clarify, he said: "I want investigations...In the case that nothing's found, I'll move on to the next thing."

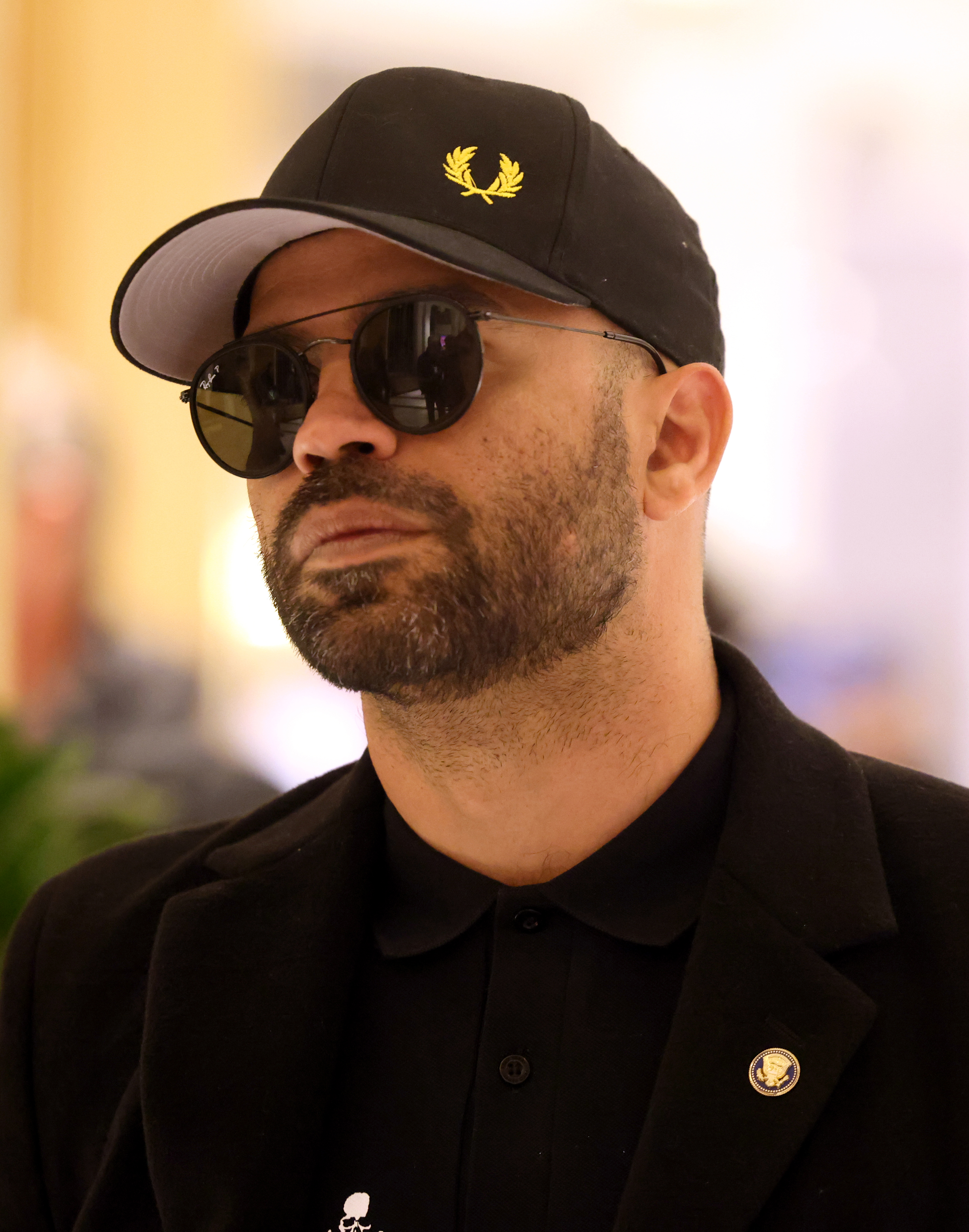
Tarrio outside the 2025 Conservative Political Action Conference

In February 2025, Tarrio and several other Proud Boys attended the Conservative Political Action Conference (CPAC) in Washington, D.C. After the conference ended, Tarrio returned to the Capitol building, where he was arrested for striking a female protester's arm. While in D.C., he also confronted a group of police officers who defended the Capitol during the January 6 attack. Tarrio accused the officers of being "cowards", while one of the officers, Michael Fanone, called Tarrio a "traitor". A month later, the acting U.S. attorney in Washington, Ed Martin, said he would not prosecute Tarrio and that the police officer who arrested him should be reprimanded.

On May 3, 2025, Tarrio and his mother dined at Mar-a-Lago on the invitation of one of the country club's members. When Trump walked by, they spoke for about 10 minutes. Tarrio later said he personally thanked Trump for the pardon, and Trump replied: "I love you guys."

On January 6, 2026, Tarrio returned to the Capitol along with other Proud Boys, insurrectionists, and supporters to commemorate the fifth anniversary of the Capitol attack.

== Personal life ==
Tarrio is of Cuban heritage and identifies as Afro-Cuban. He is divorced, having had a brief marriage in his 20s.

== See also ==
- List of cases of the January 6 United States Capitol attack (T-Z)
- Criminal proceedings in the January 6 United States Capitol attack
- List of people granted executive clemency in the second Trump presidency
