= Metropolitan African Methodist Episcopal Church =

Historic church in Washington, D.C., United States

- U.S. National Register of Historic Places
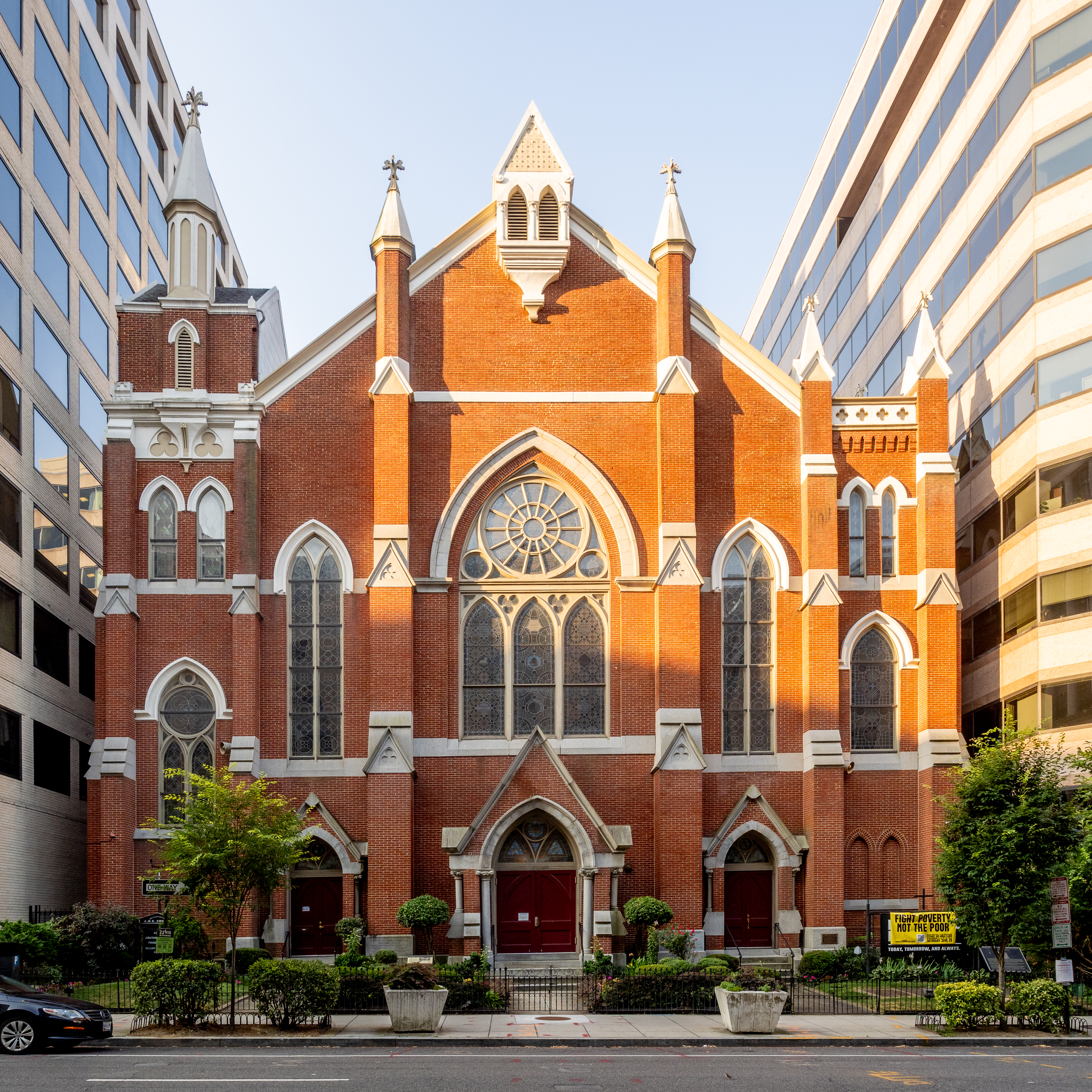
- Metropolitan AME Church in 2025

- Location within Central Washington, D.C. Location within the District of Columbia Location within the United States
- Location: 1518 M Street, N.W., Washington, D.C.
- Coordinates: 38°54′19″N 77°2′9″W
- Area: 0.3 acres (0.12 ha)
- Built: 1886
- Architect: Samuel G. T. Morsell
- Architectural style: Gothic Revival
- NRHP reference No.: 73002102
- Added to NRHP: July 26, 1973

Metropolitan African Methodist Episcopal Church ("Metropolitan AME Church") is a historic church located at 1518 M Street, N.W., in downtown Washington, D.C. It affiliates with the African Methodist Episcopal Church.

== History ==
The congregation was founded in 1838, as Union Bethel (Metropolitan) A. M. E. Church. In 1880, John W. Stevenson was appointed by Bishop Daniel Payne to be pastor of the church for the purpose of building a new church, which would become Metropolitan African Methodist Episcopal Church. The cornerstone was laid in September, 1881. However, Stevenson's methods were upsetting to some of his congregation, and Stevenson was removed before the building was finished after asking for a salary that was deemed too high. The new building was dedicated on May 30, 1886 and was constructed by architect George Dearing. According to the church, it is the oldest continuously black-owned property in the original 10-mile-square parcel of the District. The funerals of abolitionist Frederick Douglass (1895) and civil-rights activist Rosa Parks (2005) were held in the church. The building was added to the National Register of Historic Places in 1973.

=== 21st century ===
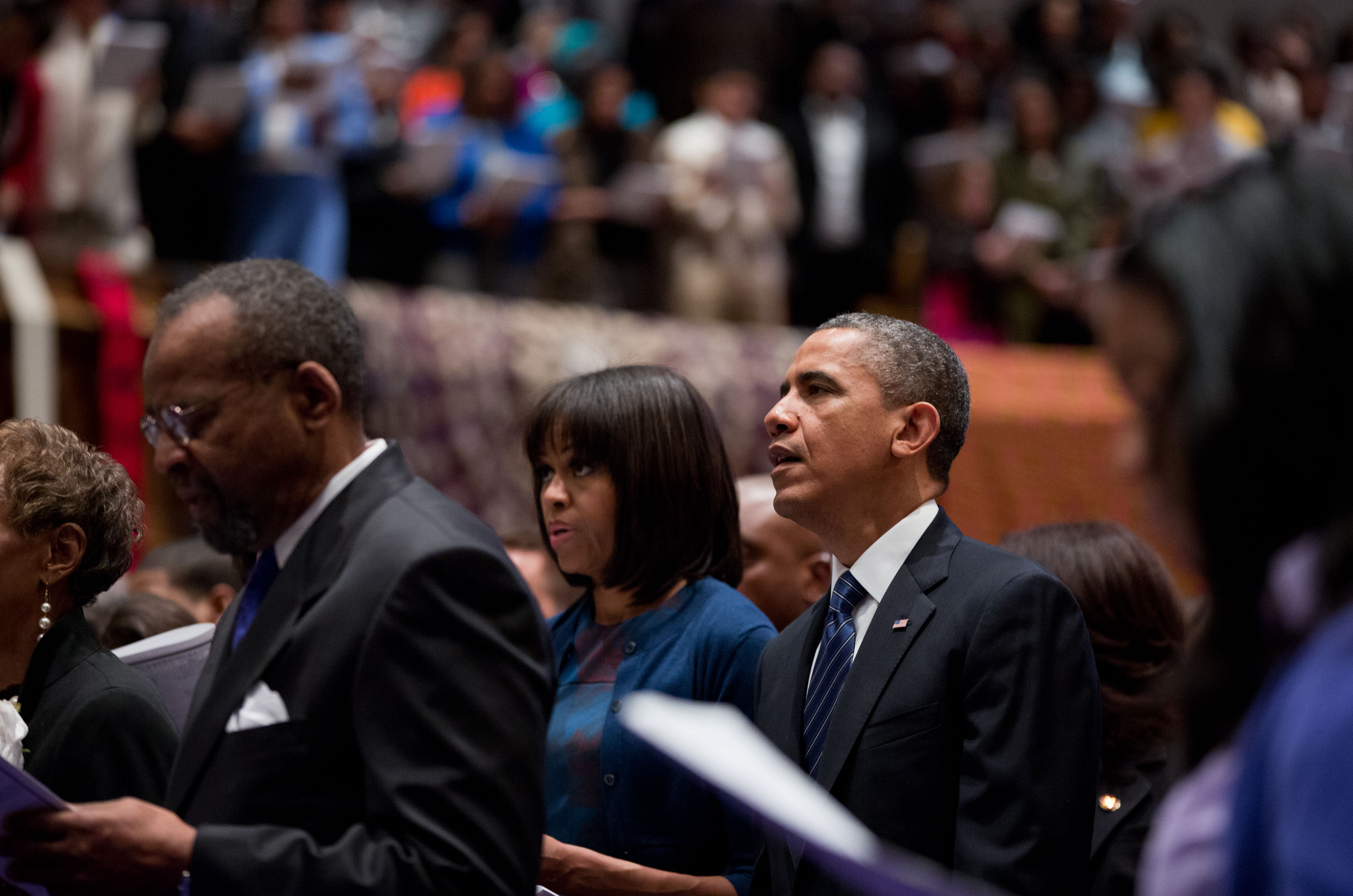
Barack and Michelle Obama attend the church services on Inauguration Day, 2013.

In May 2010, the National Trust for Historic Preservation added the building to its list of 11 of America's Most Endangered Places due to water damage and other structural problems requiring $11 million in renovations.

President Barack Obama attended services here on Sunday, January 20, 2013, before his second inauguration.

A Black Lives Matter banner was stolen from the church and burned during a pro-Trump march on December 12, 2020. Proud Boys leader Enrique Tarrio was later arrested by Washington, D.C. police and charged with one count of destruction of property, a misdemeanor offense. On January 4, 2021, the church filed a lawsuit against both Proud Boys International, LLC, and Tarrio; neither responded and the church sought default judgment against both. In June, 2023, District of Columbia Superior Court Judge Neal E. Kravitz imposed civil penalties of over $1 million on the Proud Boys and four of its members, Tarrio, Joe Biggs, Jeremy Bertino and John Turano. Kravitz said that the four men had engaged in "hateful and overtly racist conduct". On February 3, 2025, Judge Tanya Jones Bosier issued a $2.8 million default judgement against the Proud Boys that included giving the church rights to the name "Proud Boys" and control of trademarks owned by the group.

In January 2026, the church announced plans to try and construct micro-apartments for homeless veterans behind the sanctuary. In statements to The Washington Post, church leaders said that the plan was in the concept stage, and was likely three to five years from completion.

== Gallery ==
Carol M. Highsmith's 2010 photograph of the church.

A band in the church, 2010; also photographed by Highsmith.

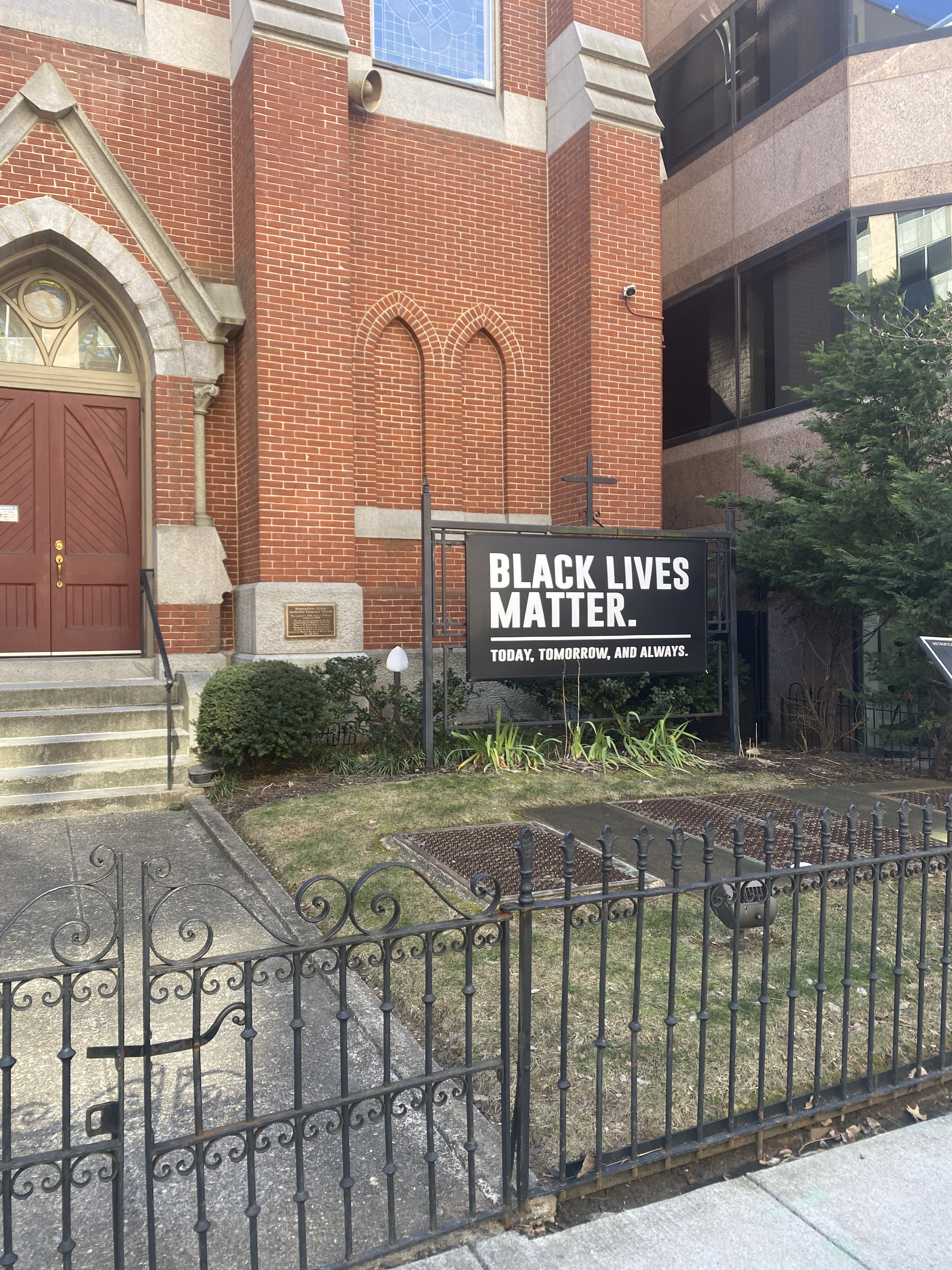
Exterior of the church in 2025, with Black Lives Matter banner visible

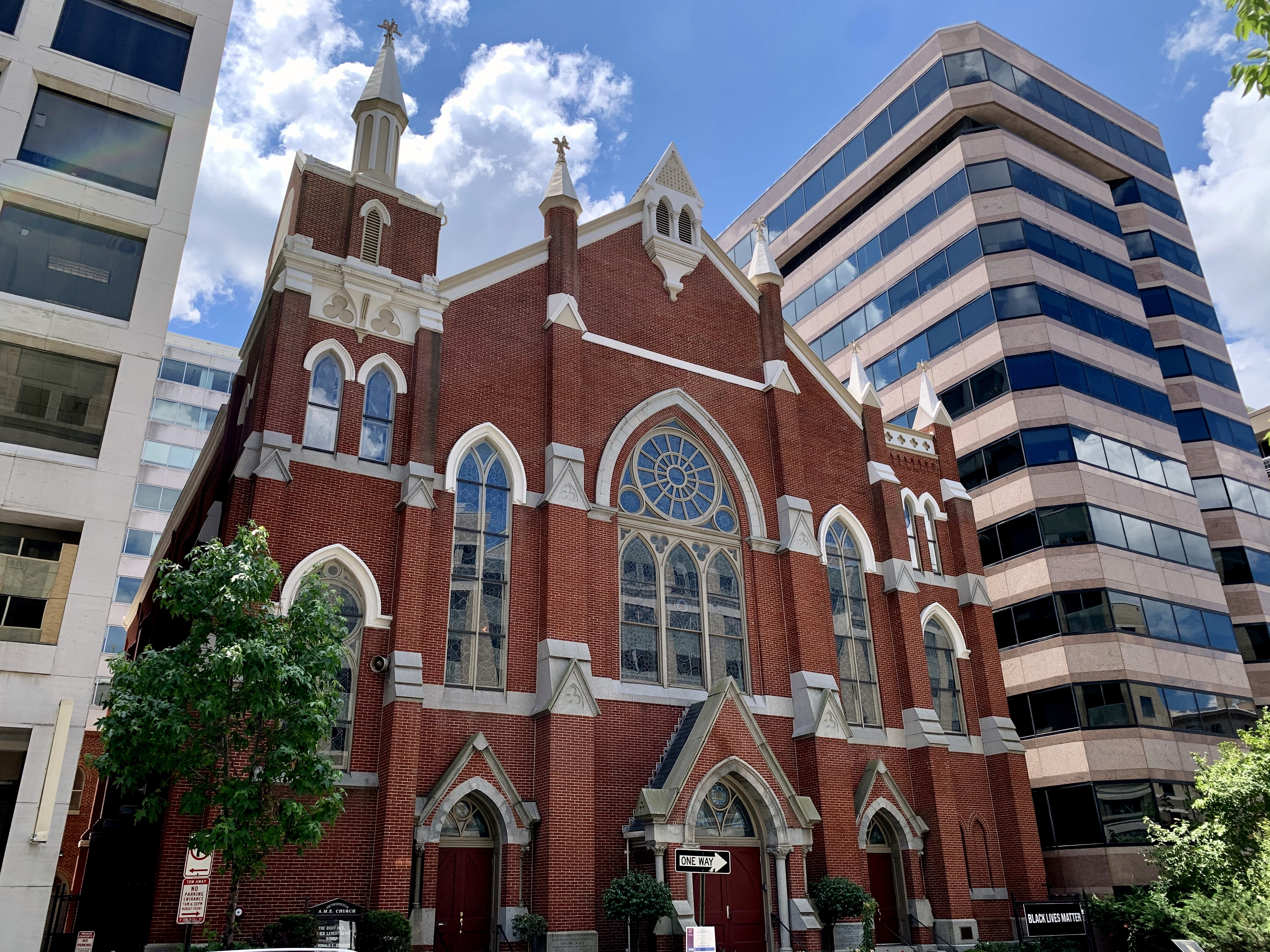
The facade in 2020.

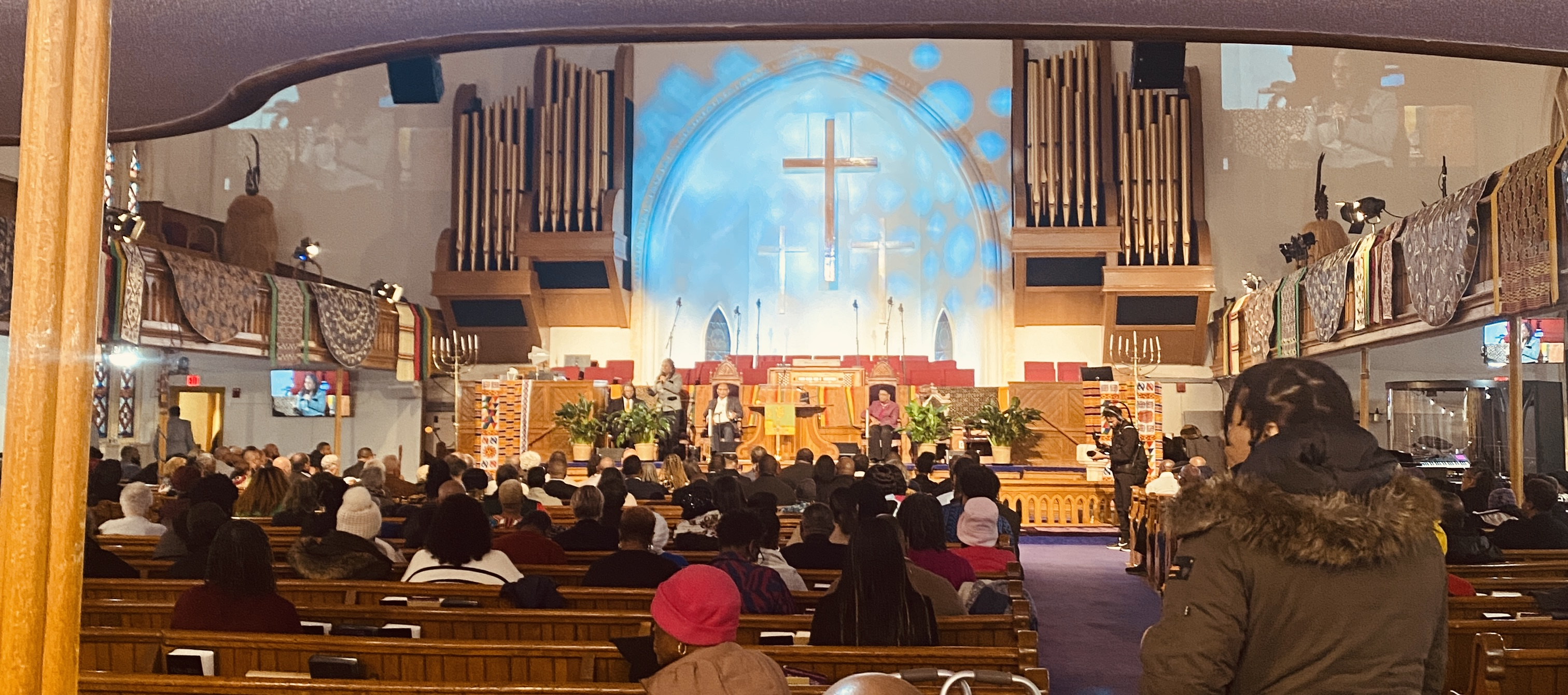
2025 interior during President's Day Press Conference.

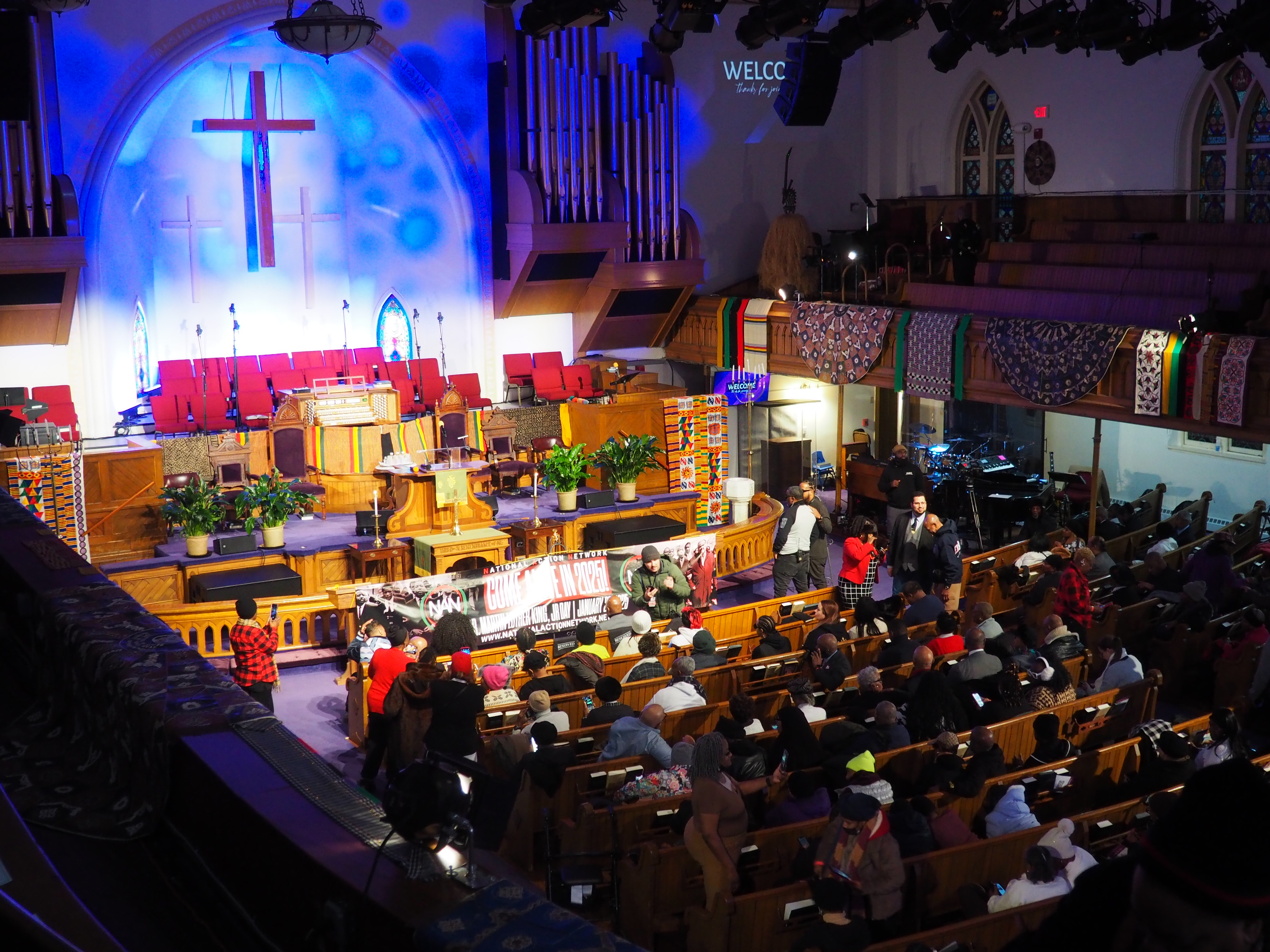
Interior of the Metropolitan African Methodist Episcopal Church, 2025.

== See also ==
- National Register of Historic Places listings in the District of Columbia
