= John Turano =

Right wing activist

- Other names: Based Spartan
- Known for: Street fighting with Antifa protesters
- Movement: Alt-right

John Turano, also known as Based Spartan, has been described as an "icon of the alt-right 'Patriot' movement, who was known for brawling with Antifa protesters in the early days of the Trump administration in 2017.

Turano was among a group of far-right activists who attacked the Metropolitan African Methodist Episcopal Church in Washington, DC on December 12, 2020. In June 2023, District of Columbia Superior Court Judge Neal E. Kravitz imposed civil penalties of over $1 million on Turano and three members of the Proud Boys, Enrique Tarrio, Joe Biggs and Jeremy Bertino in connection with the 2020 attack on the Metropolitan African Methodist Episcopal Church. Kravitz said that the four men had engaged in "hateful and overtly racist conduct"

Turano lives in Los Angeles, as of 2018. On July 17, 2021, Turano was involved in a violent protest in Los Angeles in connection with the Wi Spa controversy.
