= Norm Pattis =

American defense lawyer

Norm Pattis is an American defense lawyer and former columnist who runs a law firm in New Haven, Connecticut. He is known for defending controversial right-wing clientele, including radio show host and conspiracy theorist Alex Jones, January 6 rioters Joe Biggs and Zachary Rehl, and the alleged murderer of Jennifer Dulos, Fotis Dulos. In 2023, Pattis' law license was suspended for six months in Connecticut in relation to a violation of a court order in the Alex Jones case, but the suspension was overturned in 2024.

== Career ==
=== Fotis Dulos ===
In January 2020, Connecticut man Fotis Dulos was charged with murder and kidnapping in relation to the disappearance of his wife, Jennifer Dulos, on May 24, 2019. Fotis Dulos was represented by Pattis and Kevin Smith (a partner in Pattis' law firm), and paid them a $255,769 retainer. Pattis and Smith argued that Jennifer Dulos may have staged her disappearance to frame Fotis Dulos, comparing it to the plot of the novel Gone Girl. Fotis Dulos died by suicide on January 31, 2020, and the case against him was closed on March 3.

Dulos' mother, Gloria Farber, later sued Fotis Dulos' estate in a civil trial over the disappearance, and won. A $2 million civil judgement was given to the estate. The estate was unable to pay Farber as well as other creditors, so they, along with Jennifer Dulos' family, filed a lawsuit that claimed Pattis and Smith should not have received the $255,769 retainer because they only represented Fotis Dulos for 17 days before his death, and that the money should be returned Fotis Dulos' estate to help pay their creditors. In May 2021, the two sides settled, and agreed that Pattis and Smith would pay $137,500 in exchange for the two families' lawsuit being dropped and that Pattis and Smith could not discuss the disappearance case for the next four decades.

=== Proud Boys members ===
On January 6, 2021, supporters of then-U.S. President Donald Trump stormed the United States Capitol to prevent the counting of Electoral College votes in the 2020 presidential election that would confirm Trump's opponent, Joe Biden, to be the next President. The attack began just before 1 p.m., when Trump finished speaking at Washington D.C.'s Ellipse park and his supporters who were listening started marching east towards the Capitol, including members of the Proud Boys militia group. Proud Boys organizer Joseph Biggs and chapter leader Zachary Rehl were put on trial for seditious conspiracy, and were represented by Pattis. Both men were convicted.

In August 2023, U.S. District Judge Timothy Kelly sentenced Biggs to 17 years and Rehl to 15 years. Pattis argued that they were "misguided patriots, not terrorists", and that the Justice Department was overreaching in its prosecution at a level similar to the targeting of left-wing activists by the COINTELPRO program in the 1960s and 1970s. In October 2023, the Justice Department—headed by Attorney General Merrick Garland—appealed these convictions and two others which were much shorter than what prosecutors had recommended. Pattis called the appeals "ridiculous", and that Garland "needs a new hobby horse".

=== Alex Jones ===
In September 2022, radio show host and conspiracy theorist Alex Jones went on trial for charges by 14 relatives of victims in the 2012 Sandy Hook school shooting in Connecticut, as well as a Federal Bureau of Investigation (FBI) agent who responded to the shooting. They claimed Jones had used his radio broadcast, InfoWars, to defame and harass them by claiming they were actors taking part in a hoax created to promote gun control in the U.S. Pattis defended Jones, and unsuccessfully tried to get out of representing him in June 2022. The trial took place in Waterbury, Connecticut. In October 2022, a jury found Jones guilty.

Before the case, there was a court order to safeguard "sensitive" medical documents about the plaintiffs from the case's lawyers. In September 2022, Pattis sent the documents to the lawyers for two parents of Sandy Hook victims who won a judgment against Jones in a similar defamation case in Texas; Pattis was accused of violating the order by failing to safeguard the documents. The lead attorney for Jones called the day the parents' lawyers received the documents "the worst day of my legal career", and unsuccessfully attempted to remove the documents from them. Pattis refused to answer questions in a disciplinary hearing against him in Connecticut. The trial judge in the Connecticut case against Jones, Barbara Bellis, paused jury selection and gave both sides ten days to "make arguments about the implications of Pattis refusing to answer questions". In January 2023, Bellis suspended Pattis' law license for six months. Pattis filed a motion to delay imposing the suspension until his appeal can be heard, saying that it would compromise the cases of Jones and Biggs. In August 2023, Connecticut's Appellate Court challenged the suspension but denied Pattis' motion. In May 2024, the Appellate Court partially granted Pattis' motion.

=== Rick Silverstein ===
In January 2024, Rick Silverstein, an attorney from New Haven, Connecticut, had his law license suspended for a year by Superior Court Judge Brian Fischer for "abhorrent disciplinary conduct". Silverstein had not been responding to overdraft fees, and Silverstein had a history of legal reprimands dating back to 2000. Pattis said it was a "grotesque overreaction", and tried to make a public interest appeal regarding the decision to the state Superior Court, but was unsuccessful.

== Personal life ==
Pattis used to have a column in the New Haven Register. His father was from Crete. Pattis is non-religious, and his wife is Jewish. In 2014, he wrote a book called The Trenches.

In a 2020 profile, the CT Insider referred to Pattis' usual choice of clientele by saying he is a "Defender of the Despised". They said his political beliefs evolved from "liberal fighter for social justice to Trump voter and right-wing critic of political correctness and so-called 'woke' culture." In a 2024 opinion piece, Pattis said he is a libertarian who agrees with John Locke, and would not state if he was left- or right-wing. He criticized political violence, including the January 6 rioters and Donald Trump's threats towards Juan Merchan, the judge in Trump's trial for falsifying business records. He said that he was "no fan of law enforcement" but denounced violent threats against FBI officers.

In January 2019, the NAACP civil rights organization condemned a meme Pattis posted on Facebook as racist: an image of "three white-hooded beer cans around a brown beer bottle hanging by the neck from a refrigerator rack", captioned "Ku Klux Coors". Pattis then deleted his Facebook page, saying, "the P.C. police disgust me". The CT Post covered other Facebook and Twitter comments of Pattis which were controversial, about Rashida Tlaib, school shooting victims, and other people. He has defended his comments as being jokes. Attorney Leslie C. Levin told the Post that it was unlikely Pattis would be sanctioned by the American Bar Association (ABA) over his comments, because Connecticut had not adopted the ABA's specific wording about prohibiting discrimination by lawyers on the basis of identity.
