= Right Wing Death Squad =

Far-right slogan

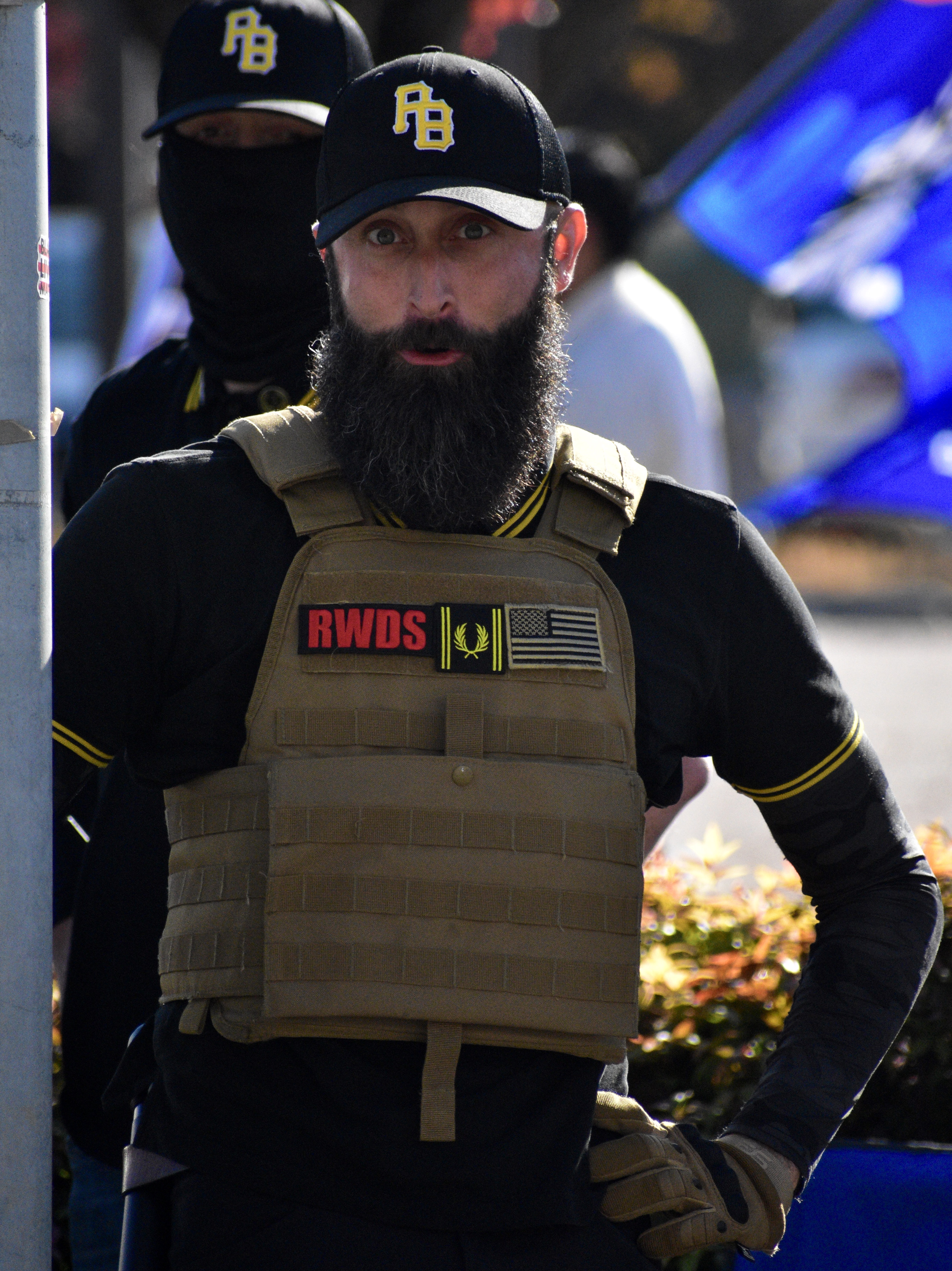
Proud Boys member Jeremy Bertino wearing a Right Wing Death Squad patch in Raleigh, North Carolina, U.S., in November 2020

Right Wing Death Squad, often abbreviated to RWDS, is a slogan used in the 21st century by far-right Americans. The term was first used in the 1970s to describe Latin American paramilitaries who targeted their left-wing opponents.

== Historical usage ==
The term was first used in the 1970s to describe Latin American paramilitary death squads who targeted left-wing opponents. The death squad dropped the leftists out of helicopters. They were called the "death flights".

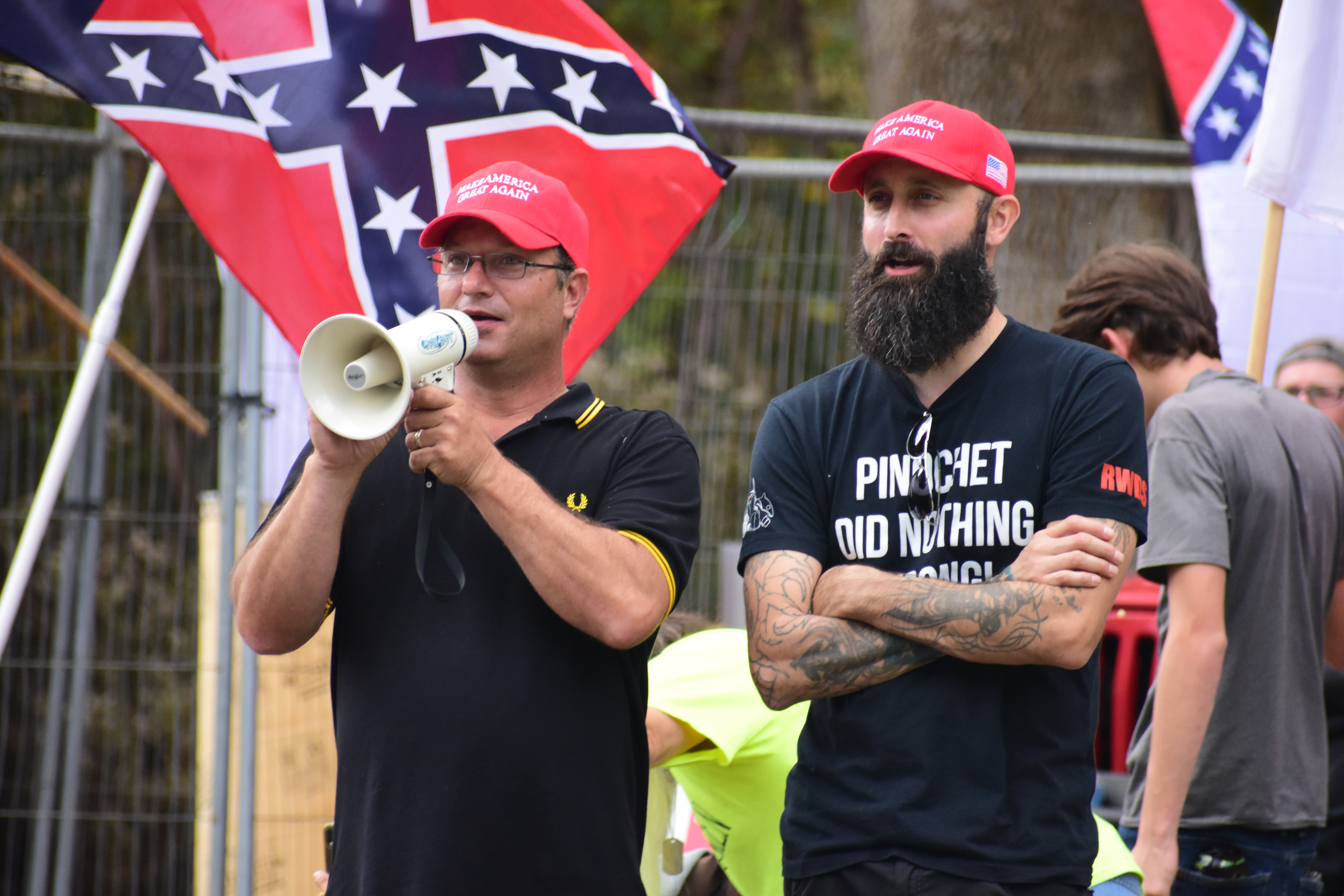
Jeremy Bertino wearing a T-shirt with "RWDS" and "Pinochet Did Nothing Wrong" slogan, 2019, Pittsboro

From the 2010s onwards, the term was used in the U.S. by far-right extremists. The term, often abbreviated to RWDS is used in memes, in online forums, on clothing, patches, and stickers. The Global Project Against Hate and Extremism attribute the terms' popularity to usage by the American neo-fascist organisation the Proud Boys. The slogan is often accompanied by the words "Pinochet Did Nothing Wrong" and the abbreviation RWDS is used as a hashtag #RWDS.

The slogan was used by attendees of the 2017 Unite the Right rally white supremacist event in Charlottesville, Virginia.

Some groups were created with names resembling RWDS, prompting Facebook to block multiple pages due to their hateful content. A 2019 Facebook group called Right Wing Death Squad was monitored by the FBI due to the violent, anti-semitic, and white supremacist content being posted.

Mauricio Garcia, the perpetrator of the 2023 Allen, Texas outlet mall shooting wore a RWDS patch when he killed eight people. After the shooting, former Proud Boys regional leader Jeremy Bertino spoke of his regret about wearing a Right Wing Death Squad patch.

== See also ==
- American militia movement
- Caravan of Death
- Crypto-fascism
- Fascist paramilitary
- Fourteen Words
- Gang signal
- Diehard Duterte Supporters
- List of political slogans
- List of United States political catchphrases
- Para-fascism
- Political Soldier
- Right-wing terrorism
- Ultraconservatism
- Z (military symbol)
