= End Domestic Terrorism rally =

2019 Proud Boys rally in Portland, Oregon, US

- Promotional artwork for the rally
- Date: August 17, 2019
- Time: 9 a.m. – 2:30 p.m.
- Venue: Tom McCall Waterfront Park
- Location: Portland, Oregon, US
- Type: Rally
- Cause: To demand the classification of anti-fascism groups as domestic terrorists in the United States
- Organized by: Proud Boys
- Participants: 200–300 protesters 500–1,000 counter-protesters Peaking at 1,200 participants
- Arrests: 13, for disorderly conduct, interfering with police, and weapon-related charges

The End Domestic Terrorism rally, sometimes subtitled "Better Dead Than Red", was a far-right demonstration organized by the Proud Boys and held in Portland, Oregon on August 17, 2019. The event, the purpose of which was to promote the idea that the "antifa" anti-fascist movement should be classified as "domestic terrorism", received national attention. The rally drew more counter-demonstrators than participants, with at least one group urging its members in advance not to attend, and ended with the Proud Boys requesting a police escort to leave.

== Planning ==
The rally was organized by talk show radio host and former InfoWars staffer Joe Biggs, who is based in Florida, to protest Portland-based antifascists, and to have antifa declared a domestic terrorist organization. Proud Boys chairman Enrique Tarrio, a two-time convicted felon, was listed as an organizer on the event's Facebook page. Tarrio said the Proud Boys did "not [come] to Portland to cause problems", but to support "innocent people, journalists and our brave law enforcement officers".

Plans for the rally were confirmed as early as July 1, 2019, after protests held on June 29 resulted in clashes. Viral video of an incident on June 29 where conservative blogger Andy Ngo was assaulted by masked demonstrators led the Proud Boys to organize the rally. The city did not issue a permit for the event, which was planned to be held at Tom McCall Waterfront Park. Members of The Daily Stormer and Oath Keepers were expected to attend. However, Oath Keepers backed out and "disavowed the rally for fear of being associated with white supremacists." While, the members of a Three Percenters militia group, and the white supremacist American Guard attended the event.

Biggs promoted the event by posting a video online in which he carries a "Trump-themed" baseball bat and t-shirt with the text "Training to Throw Communists Out of Helicopters", in reference to the summary execution of political dissidents in Chile under Augusto Pinochet's military dictatorship. He told participants not to bring weapons or fight unless they were in "imminent danger".

The president of Oath Keepers discouraged members from attending the rally or associating themselves with white nationalists.

=== Law enforcement ===
Portland mayor Ted Wheeler announced a "zero-tolerance approach" would be adopted and promised law breakers would be arrested. Organizers on both sides criticized his handling of the planned activities. Wheeler considered asking Governor Kate Brown to seek support from the Oregon National Guard.

Danielle Outlaw, chief of the Portland Police Bureau, said officers were prepared, and the president of the Portland Police Association proposed arresting all people who demonstrate without a permit. Police worked with organizers on both sides "to achieve the goal of a safe event". The Portland Police Bureau said in advance of the rally that all 1,000 of its officers would be on duty. Federal, state, and other local law enforcement agencies provided assistance to prepare for the rally.

Leading up to the rally, Biggs advocated for laws preventing protesters from wearing masks, and said, "I hope at the end of the day I can shake the cops' hands and say good job, nothing happened." Six members of Patriot Prayer, including political activist Joey Gibson, were arrested days before the event.

The Portland Police Bureau encouraged people to avoid Waterfront Park and visit other parts of the city. The Federal Bureau of Investigation planned to have a presence at the rally. Deployment of the National Guard was considered but avoided.

=== Reaction ===
Leaders of civil rights, community, and religious groups condemned the event's organizers and ideology, and approximately 100 people gathered at Pioneer Courthouse Square on August 14 to speak out against violence. Jo Ann Hardesty said, "You want to be hateful, stay home. Do not get on a plane, on a bus and come to Portland. We don't want you here. We never wanted you here. If you come, we will expose you to the light of day." Wheeler, Outlaw, US Attorney Billy J. Williams, and Joey Webber of the Portland Timbers also attended the August 14 rally.

President Donald Trump monitored developments and tweeted, "Major consideration is being given to naming ANTIFA an 'ORGANIZATION OF TERROR.' Portland is being watched very closely. Hopefully the Mayor will be able to properly do his job!" Wheeler responded, "My job today is to be heads down and focused on maintaining the public safety here in Portland, Oregon. I'm focused on what's going on the ground here in my community... This is a potentially dangerous and volatile situation, and adding to that noise doesn't do anything to support or help the efforts that are going on here in Portland." According to Business Insider, "The president's remarks quickly drew scrutiny for siding with the far-right."

Antifascist groups made plans for nonviolent counter-protests. Popular Mobilization hosted "The Spectacle" to "downplay the far-right's rhetoric and inject the atmosphere with whimsy and 'joyful resistance'"; planned activities included a banana costume dance party, mask decorating, and dressing as the Pile of Poo emoji. Rose City Antifa issued a statement calling on counter-protestors to defend the city from a "far-right attack". Miles Thompson and his Unpresidented Brass Band, a 12-person marching band, planned to march with 50 counter protesters in banana costumes, hosting a "Banana Bloc Dance Party". Counter-protesters also organized a fundraiser to benefit Causa, based on the number of rally supporters; according to HuffPost, the organization "advocates for Oregon's Latino population at the state and national level, and helps protect local undocumented immigrants from deportation".

== Event ==
Members of Proud Boys started gathering at the Morrison Bridge at approximately 9 a.m., then started marching south an hour later. They held a prayer service underneath an American flag at Waterfront Park at approximately 10:30 a.m. Officers maintained distance between opposing groups, keeping members of Proud Boys and other right-wing groups south of the Morrison Bridge and counter-protesters north of the bridge. Later, members of Proud Boys marched over Tilikum Crossing while counter-protesters crossed the Burnside Bridge. The demonstration was over by approximately 2:30 p.m.

Crowd estimates varied. CBS News and the Portland Mercury reported there were 200 and 300 people attending in support of the rally, respectively. There were approximately 500 counter-demonstrators, according to Willamette Week. Police estimated there were approximately 1,000 protesters, and the Portland Mercury's Alex Zielinski wrote, "At its peak, there were an estimated 300 right-wing protesters and 1,000 left-wing protesters in downtown Portland."

The event remained mostly calm. Police arrested 13 people, and confiscated weapons, including bear spray, poles, and shields.

Gibson attended the rally. The president of the local NAACP affiliate was among the counter-protesters.

According to Al Jazeera, "More than two dozen local, state and federal law enforcement agencies, including the FBI and the Federal Protective Service ... gathered in Portland to help police monitor the right-wing rally." The Proud Boys pledged to return to Portland monthly until Wheeler "excises the alt-left groups from his city".

=== Impact ===
Some local businesses changed plans or closed for the day because of the demonstrations. Roses on the River, a 5K run and walk affiliated with the Portland Thorns FC, was relocated to the other side of the Willamette River to avoid potential conflicts. The Portland Streetcar Scavenger Hunt was postponed. Multiple Starbucks locations in downtown Portland closed for the day. Kells Irish Pub cancelled its annual "Summer Smoker" amateur boxing match. Two performances at Keller Auditorium took place as scheduled, but the venue hired increased security.

The Portland Bureau of Transportation closed the northbound side of Southwest Naito Parkway from 9 a.m. to 4 p.m. on the preceding Friday and following Monday. Prior to the event, TriMet said services would be altered as needed if law enforcement determined riders were at risk, and confirmed delays were expected. On the day of the rally, Southwest 2nd Avenue from Southwest Madison to Main streets was closed, as were the Hawthorne Bridge and SmartPark garage at 1st Avenue and Jefferson Street.
