= John W. Stevenson (minister) =

- Born: August 15, 1835; Baltimore, Maryland
- Died: October 1, 1898 (aged 63); Philadelphia, Pennsylvania
- Occupation: Minister

Religious life
- Religion: African Methodist Episcopal Church

John W. Stevenson (August 15, 1835 - October 1, 1898) was an African Methodist Episcopal (AME) Church minister. He was the financier and builder of the Metropolitan African Methodist Episcopal Church in Washington, DC, which was the largest black church in the country at the time of its building. He was a talented fundraiser and built a number of other churches and was pastor of many churches in Maryland, New Jersey, Pennsylvania, New York, and New England. He was an important figure in the church and eventually held the position of presiding Elder of the New York district.

== Early life ==
Stevenson was born in Baltimore, Maryland, on August 15, 1835, to John and Ann Stevenson. In 1840, the couple and their six children moved to Trinidad where Stevenson's father died within a year. His mother returned to Baltimore, with the six children and a seventh child which had been born to them during the passage. Stevenson was then bound out to work on the farm of J. P. Stamly. Stevenson was not considered well behaved and was sold four times until, at eighteen, he succeeded in purchasing his own times with earnings of extra labor. He moved to Philadelphia and took worth with a barber, and then a porter at the drug store of Henry Kollock. Stevenson showed himself to be talented and store clerks William Kearney and his brother began to teach him. Kollock sent Stevenson to a black physician practicing in the city, Dr. Wilson, so that Stevenson could learn medicine. Wilson sent Stevenson to the Philadelphia University of Eclectic Medicine where he took lessons from Professor Woodward.

== Ministry ==
In 1858, Stevenson felt he should follow a different path and was licensed to preach by Rev. Joshua Woodlin and became the adopted son of Bishop Jabez Pitt Campbell. He was also influenced by Bishop Willis Nazrey. Stevenson was sent to West Chester, Pennsylvania, and then to Freehold, New Jersey, where he worked as an itinerant preacher and physician. He was ordained a deacon in 1864 and attended the general conference of the A. M. E. church. He was then sent to the Oxford, Pennsylvania circuit. He took classes at Lincoln University in Oxford for three years, studying under Bishop Matthew Simpson.

Stevenson was a noted financier of churches, having built six churches by 1867. He wrote a pamphlet about his work and about the financing of church buildings. In this pamphlet, he describes the circuit preaching he did and the churches he built. The first church he built was in West Chester, Pennsylvania, in 1859. He later moved to a new circuit and built two more in Snow Hill, New Jersey, and Milford, New Jersey, with the support of Ezra Evans, a Quaker. He then moved on to the Delaware Circuit headquartered at Camden, Delaware. There he started a church at Dover, Delaware, with only the foundation laid when he moved to Wilkes Barre, Pennsylvania, where he completed the financing and building of a church there. While that work was ongoing he moved to Bloomsburg, Pennsylvania, where he built another church. In 1874 he moved to Burlington, New Jersey, where in a place called Mount Holly he built a church and a school house and remodeled another church. Three years later he moved to Trenton, New Jersey, where there existed a church called,"Old Mount Zion." This church was to be taken down and a new, larger structure built. During this time he also built a church in Yardley, Pennsylvania, across the Delaware River from Trenton.

Stevenson was then appointed presiding elder of the eastern district of New Jersey with headquarters at Trenton; a district which included Princeton, Pennington, Rahway, New Brunswick, Elizabeth, Newark, Orange, Paterson, Washington, Morristown, Freehold, and Jersey City. Stevenson worked with churches at those places to relieve debt and build, particularly helping finance a new chapel at Washington. In 1880, he was appointed by Bishop Daniel Payne to Union Bethel Church in Washington DC for the purpose of building a new church, which would become Metropolitan African Methodist Episcopal Church and was dedicated on May 30, 1886. The cornerstone was laid in September, 1881. However, Stevenson's methods were upsetting to some of his congregation, and Stevenson was removed after asking for a salary that was deemed too high.

In July 1889, Stevenson was appointed presiding elder of the New York Conference, and he became pastor at Brooklyn's Union Bethel Church. He then moved to St. Paul's AME Church in Orange, New York. He was removed from that position by Bishop Benjamin Tucker Tanner in 1892 in a dispute about Stevenson's salary. Stevenson then moved to Boston.

During his career, Stevenson frequently contributed writings and even poetry to the AME journal, the Recorder.

== End of career and death ==
Stevenson was superannuated in Philadelphia in May 1894. Stevenson died in Philadelphia on October 1, 1898, and was buried on October 5.
