= Murder of Jennifer Dulos =

2019 murder in U.S. state of Connecticut

- Date: May 24, 2019
- Time: Approximately 8:15 a.m. (EDT)
- Location: New Canaan, Connecticut, United States; 41.1308°N 73.5136°W
- Type: Uxoricide
- Motive: End divorce and child-custody proceedings
- Perpetrator: Fotis Dulos (believed)
- Arrests: 3
- Accused: Fotis Dulos, Michelle Troconis, and Kent Mawhinney
- Convicted: Troconis
- Charges: Evidence tampering, hindering prosecution, capital murder, murder, conspiracy to commit murder
- Trial: 2024 (Troconis)
- Verdict: Guilty
- Convictions: All charges

Jennifer Dulos (née Farber; born September 27, 1968; presumed dead May 24, 2019; ruled legally dead October 24, 2023) was an American woman who went missing on May 24, 2019. Authorities believe that she was killed in an attack at her home in New Canaan, Connecticut, United States. Her estranged husband, Fotis Dulos, and his girlfriend, Michelle Troconis, were arrested on charges of tampering with evidence and hindering prosecution in connection with Jennifer's disappearance. Later, the two – along with Fotis's attorney Kent Mawhinney – faced additional charges related to Jennifer's murder.

Fotis died by suicide in January 2020. Troconis was convicted of the six charges against her in March 2024 and sentenced to 14 1/2 years in prison in May. Mawhinney was sentenced to 11 months in prison.

Jennifer and Fotis were in the midst of a contentious divorce and child-custody proceedings. Police believe Fotis lay in wait for Jennifer, attacking her when she returned home after dropping her children off at school. In the evening, he and Troconis drove to Hartford to dispose of garbage bags containing items with Jennifer's blood on them. Police further allege that Mawhinney conspired with Fotis and Troconis.

== Background ==
Jennifer Farber Dulos (September 27, 1968 – c. May 24, 2019) was born in New York City to Gloria Ortenberg and Hilliard Farber, a banker and philanthropist respectively. She has an older sister, Melissa Irene Farber. Jennifer's maternal uncle and aunt-by-marriage, Elizabeth Claiborne and Arthur Ortenberg, founded the fashion company Liz Claiborne Inc. Jennifer graduated from Brown University in 1990 and later earned a master's degree in writing from New York University Tisch School of the Arts. A stay-at-home mother, Jennifer made her living as a writer for Patch.com and also ran her own blog.

Fotis Dulos (August 6, 1967 – January 30, 2020) was born in Turkey and grew up in Athens, Greece, moving to the U.S. in 1986. He graduated from Brown as well in 1989, and later earned an MBA in finance from Columbia Business School. Fotis married Hilary Vanessa Aldama, also a Brown graduate, in Athens in June 2000. The marriage lasted four years. That year Dulos founded Fore Group Inc., a real estate development company based in Connecticut, specializing in luxury homes.

Dulos started emailing Farber, whom he had also met at Brown, while still with his first wife. They married in Manhattan just over a month after Dulos' divorce, and subsequently moved to Farmington, Connecticut. They had five children together, including two sets of twins, all named after Greek Orthodox saints – three sons: Petros, Theodore, and Constantine; and two daughters: Christiane and Cleopatra Noelle.

In a 2012 blog post, Jennifer alluded to trouble in her marriage: "I wish I were a strong person and that confrontation did not both scare and appall me."

After the gradual breakdown of the marriage, in which Jennifer claimed Fotis was living an increasingly independent life, she filed for divorce in 2017, at Superior Court in Stamford. That same month she rented a house in New Canaan, about 70 mi (110 km) southwest of Farmington, and moved there with the children.

In her divorce filings, Jennifer wrote: "I know that filing for divorce, and filing this motion will enrage him. I know he will retaliate by trying to harm me in some way." She also stated she believed he was having an affair with his colleague, Michelle Troconis, a native of Venezuela. After finding out about the affair, Jennifer moved out of their home and Michelle and her daughter from a prior relationship moved in. Michelle was not married to her daughter's father, a former Olympic skier from Argentina. At the time of her death, Fotis Dulos was effectively broke.

Jennifer also alleged that Fotis had threatened to kidnap their children if she did not agree to his terms in the divorce settlement, and that he had bought a gun that year; Fotis denied making threats and claimed he bought the gun legally for home security. Both parents filed numerous motions claiming that the other was disparaging them.

Jennifer had requested an emergency order of custody while the couple were given temporary joint custody of their children until the end of the divorce proceedings. When Jennifer again requested an emergency order of custody in early 2018, the judge found that Fotis had violated several court orders. In March of that year Jennifer was awarded sole physical custody, while both parents were to share joint legal custody. Fotis was granted supervised visitation and monitored phone calls.

In February 2018, after Jennifer's father's death, Gloria Farber, Jennifer's mother, sued Fotis for unpaid loans. She claimed he owed them $1.7 million loaned to him by his father-in-law Hilliard Farber.

== Disappearance ==
Jennifer was last seen at around 8 a.m. on May 24, 2019, when she dropped her children off at New Canaan Country School, and then at 8:05 on a neighbor's security camera returning home. The same day, she missed two doctors' appointments that she had scheduled for 11 a.m. and 1 p.m. in New York City. Later that evening, at around 7 p.m., two of her friends, including her nanny Lauren Almeida, reported her missing after they failed to get in contact with her. Family and friends of Jennifer stated that it would be out of character for her to leave home on her own without telling anyone.

Almeida, who had arrived at the house at 11:30 a.m. that day, later told detectives she was surprised to see Jennifer's Range Rover in the garage because she had planned to take it to her doctors' appointments instead of her Chevrolet Suburban, which was missing. When detectives searched the house, they found blood spatter on the floor, door and a wall in the garage, as well as on the exterior of the Range Rover. Blood was also found in the kitchen. DNA tests revealed most of the blood to be Jennifer's, apart from blood on the kitchen faucet, a mixture belonging to both her and Fotis. Police also found other evidence of Jennifer being the victim of a serious assault.

Jennifer's Chevrolet Suburban had been captured on the neighbor's security camera leaving her home at around 10:25 that morning. According to authorities, Fotis was the one driving the victim's vehicle, carrying the body of Jennifer and other items associated with the probable cleanup. That same evening, at around 7:30 p.m., Fotis and Troconis were captured on video dumping garbage bags in thirty bins in Hartford. The trash bags were found to contain various pieces of bloodied clothing and bloodstained cleaning items. The blood was found to be that of Jennifer. Fotis' DNA was found on the inside of a glove in one of the trash bags, and on one of them. The Suburban was later found at the side of a road near Waveny Park in New Canaan, just over three miles (4.8 km) away from her home.

Police searched numerous properties in and around Farmington, in Fairfield County, and near Fotis's home without success. Investigators believe he arrived by bike at Jennifer's home due to tire marks found and other evidence. Fotis is believed to have lain in wait for her to return, and killed her in the garage. Helicopters, canine units and divers were used to look for signs of Jennifer. There has been no activity on her credit cards and no calls made from her cell phone since she disappeared.

In January 2021, the Connecticut State Police visited property on Mountain Spring Road in Farmington, which was once owned by Fotis's real estate company, to follow up on "old leads". Several authorities could be seen behind the property digging up the yard. Police also brought in Bob Perry, an expert at finding unmarked gravesites, though he would not say if anything had been discovered. The next day, police returned to the property with an excavator and a septic tank. Police told the media afterward they did not have any updates.

Jennifer's body has not been found. In October 2020, her family sought to have her declared legally dead; the request was denied five months later as the seven-year deadline required under Connecticut law since she was last known to have been alive had not elapsed. But in October 2023, another court granted an expedited request for a declaration of death since Jennifer's mother, her children's legal guardian, was at an advanced age and unsure she could live long enough for the children to inherit from either her or Jennifer's estate.

== Initial arrests ==
On June 1, 2019, Fotis and Troconis were arrested at a hotel in Avon, Connecticut, and charged with tampering with evidence and hindering prosecution. There was no evidence at that time to warrant any more serious charges. The Dulos' five children, then aged between 8 and 13, moved to New York City to live with Jennifer's mother, who was granted temporary custody.

Fotis hired attorney Norm Pattis to represent him. In an interview, prior to being hired by Fotis, Pattis had appeared convinced that Jennifer was dead. Fotis and Troconis both pleaded not guilty to the charges. They were again arrested for tampering with evidence, and again pleaded not guilty, in September 2019.

In late October, it was reported Troconis, along with her 10-year-old daughter, had moved out of Fotis' $5 million home in Farmington.

== 2020 arrests ==
In January 2020, Fotis was arrested at his home by the Connecticut State Police and charged with capital murder, murder, and kidnapping in relation to Jennifer's disappearance. Troconis was also arrested and charged with conspiracy to commit murder. Fotis's friend and former attorney, Kent Douglas Mawhinney, was also arrested that day and charged with conspiracy to commit murder.

Mawhinney had become estranged from his wife after being accused of spousal rape. She went to South Windsor police and told authorities that she feared Fotis and Mawhinney were working together to kill her. After Jennifer disappeared, a shallow grave was discovered at a secluded property that Mawhinney owned, filled with two bags of lime and a blue tarp. Authorities discovered the grave in August 2019, but no body was found in the grave, and said items were found to have been removed.

Jennifer's family issued a statement after the arrests: "Although we are relieved that the wait for these charges is over, for us, there is no sense of closure. Nothing can bring Jennifer back. We miss her every day and will forever mourn her loss."

Fotis's bond was set at $6 million. He was released the following day and was due to return to court on February 28.

In a statement issued in May, Troconis said it was a "mistake" to have trusted Fotis, but maintained she did not know what happened to Jennifer or where she was. Troconis, out on bail, was next scheduled to appear in court August 6 to face the charges. Mawhinney was being held in lieu of $2 million bond, but the bond was reduced to $246,000 and he was released in October 2020.

== Fotis Dulos suicide ==
While out on bail, Dulos failed to appear at a January 28, 2020 emergency bond hearing. He was found in an unresponsive state by police at his home in Farmington, having poisoned himself with carbon monoxide by running a vacuum-cleaner hose from the exhaust pipe of his SUV into the interior of the car while it was parked in his garage. Responders restored a faint pulse after doing CPR. He was taken to Jacobi Medical Center in The Bronx to undergo hyperbaric oxygen therapy. Fotis's children visited him at the medical center before he was taken off life support.

Fotis was pronounced dead two days later.

== Media ==
Dateline NBC aired a segment about the case in 2019. A followup episode entitled "The Day Jennifer Disappeared" aired on September 2, 2022. Following the Troconis verdict, the episode "A Life Interrupted" aired on March 1, 2024.

The documentary Vanished in New Canaan: An ID Mystery, which premiered on Investigation Discovery on June 1, 2020, investigates Dulos's disappearance.

The case was covered in a 2021 Lifetime television film, Gone Mom: The Jennifer Dulos story, with Annabeth Gish as Jennifer Dulos and Warren Christie as Fotis Dulos.

== Jennifers' Law ==
In May 2021, a domestic violence bill – "Jennifers' Law" – received near unanimous support in the Connecticut State Senate. The proposed law is named after Jennifer Dulos and another victim of domestic violence in Connecticut, Jennifer Magnano, who was murdered in 2007 by her husband, Scott Magnano, in Terryville. It expanded the definition of the crime to include coercive control. On June 28, 2021, Governor Ned Lamont signed the bill into law.

== See also ==
- Crime in Connecticut
- List of murder convictions without a body
- List of people who disappeared mysteriously (2000–present)
