= 2023 Allen, Texas, mall shooting =

Mass shooting in Texas, U.S.

- Location: 33.1327°N 96.6608°W; Allen, Texas, U.S.
- Date: May 6, 2023; 3:36 – 3:40 p.m. (UTC−5)
- Attack type: Mass shooting; mass murder
- Weapon: Smith and Wesson M&P15 AR-15–style rifle
- Deaths: 9 (including the perpetrator)
- Injuries: 7
- Perpetrator: Mauricio Martinez Garcia
- Motive: Unknown (Possibly neo Nazism)

On May 6, 2023, a mass shooting occurred at Allen Premium Outlets, an outlet center in Allen, Texas, United States. Nine people, including the perpetrator, were killed during the shooting, the youngest of whom was a three-year-old boy, and seven others were injured. The perpetrator was fatally shot by a police officer already in the area on an unrelated call.

The shooter, 33-year-old Mauricio Martinez Garcia, was a known white supremacist and Nazi admirer, although his specific motive for the shooting is not clear. Martinez Garcia's extensive online writings showed that he self-radicalized, adopting and promoting white supremacist, neo-Nazi, and incel ideologies, and posting hateful comments against women, Jews and racial minorities in the lead-up to the attack. He committed the massacre while wearing a tactical vest embroidered with a "RWDS" ("Right Wing Death Squad") patch. His body was tattooed with fascist symbols including SS runes and a large swastika.

== Background ==
Opened in September 2000, Allen Premium Outlets is a large outdoor mall owned by Simon Property Group. The center is located 25 miles (40 km) north of Dallas, Texas, in a northern suburb of the Dallas–Fort Worth metroplex.

== Shooting ==
External videos
- BODYCAM: Allen police release video showing officer who shot and killed shooter

The shooting began on May 6, 2023, at 3:36 p.m. CDT. Wearing black tactical gear, the shooter exited a silver sedan and shot into a crowd outside the mall, near the H&M store. After shooting people near H&M, the gunman moved to the right along the building, continuing to shoot, as a result shot 15 people within three or four minutes. Witnesses said the shooter appeared to be firing indiscriminately and fired dozens of shots. A store employee recounted that those running from the shooter alerted others of the shooting and helped shelter customers and employees in the backrooms of the store. A military veteran attempted to give CPR to at least three of the victims, and recounted that many victims were rushed to a hospital as they were unable to be triaged at the site due to the severity of the injuries.

The Allen Police Department said that calls from the mall came in at 3:40 p.m., and tweeted at 4:22 p.m. that law enforcement was at the Allen Premium Outlets. Allen police chief Brian Harvey said that an officer who was at the mall on an unrelated call, after hearing gunshots, engaged and killed the shooter. Bodycam footage from the officer who shot the shooter was subsequently released. According to the autopsy report, the shooter was shot a total of 3 times, once in the head through the mouth, once in the arm, and once in the ear, with the mouth shot being immediately fatal.

Three guns were found on the gunman's body; five more were recovered from his car. He had purchased all eight guns legally. He used a Smith and Wesson M&P15 AR-15–style rifle during the shooting.

== Victims ==
Eight victims were killed. Those killed were: Kyu Song Cho, 37; Shin Young "Cindy" Kang, 35; James Cho, 3; Aishwarya Thatikonda, 27; Daniela Mendoza, 11; Sofia Mendoza, 8; Christian LaCour, 20; Elio Cumana-Rivas, 32.

Seven others were injured, with three in critical condition. Medical City Healthcare said that it was treating victims ranging from 5 to 61 years old, with most of the victims being transported to Medical City's McKinney facility. As of May 10, authorities had released no information regarding the identities of the wounded. Other sources indicated that the injured included the mother of the two deceased sisters, and the other child of the family of Korean descent who was the sole survivor of his family.

== Perpetrator ==
Mauricio Martinez Garcia (October 24, 1989 – May 6, 2023), aged 33, of Northeast Dallas was the shooter. Garcia had worked as a security guard for at least three companies in preceding years. During his time working as a security guard, Garcia received firearms training. He had been living in a motel before the shooting. Garcia had no criminal history. Shortly after graduating Bryan Adams High School in Casa View, Garcia was then enlisted in the U.S. Army in June 2008, but he never completed basic training: he was terminated after three months due to mental health concerns. Because this was an administrative separation, rather than a punitive discharge, Garcia's termination by the Army would not show up on the National Instant Criminal Background Check System, the national database used by US gun dealers to identify persons ineligible to purchase firearms.

=== Political beliefs and online activity ===
During the attack, Garcia wore a patch with the insignia "RWDS" (standing for "Right Wing Death Squad"), a slogan popular among right-wing extremists and white supremacists. On his social media profile on the Russian social media platform Odnoklassniki (OK.ru), Garcia posted neo-Nazi and white supremacist content, and expressed hatred against Jews, women, and racial minorities in the days and weeks leading up to the massacre. He posted photos of himself with large Nazi tattoos, including a swastika, the SS lightning bolt logo, and also a tattoo of the slogan "Deus Vult", a reference to the Crusades that is commonly used by neo-Nazis in anti-Muslim messaging.

Garcia's online posts used anti-Arab and anti-Asian slurs. In different posts, he shared content and posted quotations, from far-right sources, including 4chan, Nick Fuentes, the Daily Stormer and its founder Andrew Anglin, the Unz Review, StoneToss, and VDARE. He praised other mass shooters such as the perpetrators of the 2023 Nashville school shooting and the 2014 Isla Vista killings; uploaded photographs of the outlet mall site three weeks before the attack (including the entrance where he later opened fire, and screenshots of a page showing peak visiting hours for the mall), and fantasized about race wars and the collapse of society. In some posts, he identified himself as an "incel". The Odnoklassniki account did not have any friends or comments from others, suggesting that he used the account as a diary. Garcia may have selected the platform because it has almost no content moderation. His final note on the platform, shortly before the mass shooting, bore resemblances to a suicide note; The Washington Post reported that the message "included more than 500 words of violent, hateful fantasies, self-aggrandizement and pop-culture references" such as references to South Park, other television shows, and films. Garcia also had channel on YouTube entitled "Dusty Shackleford", where he saved more than 370 clips in his featured videos, including incel thematic music and a series of clips about the Sandy Hook school shooting and Adam Lanza. On May 6, 2023, the day of the shooting, a video was posted on this channel with a link to his Odnoklassniki account. Law enforcement said in a press conference that Garcia had "neo-Nazi ideation".

== Aftermath ==
A vigil was held on May 7 at 5 p.m. at the Cottonwood Creek Baptist Church, with Governor Greg Abbott and Lieutenant Governor Dan Patrick in attendance. A makeshift memorial for the victims was erected near the mall, with crosses installed in honor of the deceased by artist Roberto Marquez, who had erected crosses at other mass shooting locations.

On May 8, the Texas House of Representatives Select Committee on Community Safety voted, 8–5, to advance a bill to raise the age to buy AR-15-style rifles from 18 to 21, with two Republicans joining all Democrats in support. The bill was considered to have been unlikely to be successful in the Texas Senate. However, it never made it to the Senate as the Calendars Committee of the House left the bill off the schedule, preventing it from being voted on by the full House.

On May 8–9, mall patrons were allowed to retrieve their parked vehicles under security escort. Personal belongings found in the mall were transferred by police to a nearby recreation center for retrieval.

On May 10, the plans of at least three Plano Independent School District high schools to walk out on May 17 in protest of continued gun violence was shared by students on social media. Threats had also been made against multiple schools in North Texas after the shooting which at least one student highlighted when speaking about his participation in the walk-out. Student walkouts protesting perceived government inaction in response to the shooting took place on May 11 at Allen High School, the Lovejoy Independent School District, and San Antonio.

On May 16, volunteers and first responders dismantled a large makeshift memorial at the outlet mall.

The mall reopened on May 31, but individual stores reopened at the discretion of the owners.

On May 18, the city of Allen and a gun show organizer announced that a gun show scheduled in Allen on July 15–16 had been canceled by mutual agreement, but neither party would elaborate on the reasons for the cancellation. The organizer announced that an incipient show in Bedford, Texas, was also canceled, but did not disclose whether two shows scheduled in Allen later in 2023 would take place.

On June 28, footage from the body cam of the police officer who shot and killed the perpetrator was released.

One year after the shooting, on May 6, 2024, an 11-foot tall permanent memorial was installed at the northwest interior section of the outlet mall.

== Investigation ==
Police said that Garcia had been staying at an extended-stay hotel in northwest Dallas, and that search warrants had been executed at the hotel and a home in northeast Dallas. His motive for committing the shooting is unknown.

On June 26, a grand jury cleared the unnamed officer who fatally shot Garcia of any wrongdoing, saying state law justified the use of force. Two days later the Allen Police Department released an edited version of the officer's body cam footage, beginning with the first heard shots and ending with the officer approaching the mortally wounded Garcia. Allen Police also said they had requested an independent review from the International Association of Chiefs of Police for purposes of improving training.

== Reactions ==
President Joe Biden was briefed on the shooting. As he had done following previous mass shootings, Biden urged Congress to pass an assault weapons ban and enact universal background checks legislation, writing, "Tweeted thoughts and prayers are not enough." Flags were lowered at half-staff to honor the victims until May 11.

Abbott said the shooting was an "unspeakable tragedy", and Patrick said, "We are grateful for our brave first responders who were deployed to stop the shooter and investigate this hideous crime. We are thankful for their bravery and courage". Abbott said he would travel to Allen on Sunday to meet with the community. Senator Ted Cruz thanked "incredible law enforcement" for stopping the shooting and also offered prayers to the victims.

Representative Keith Self, a Republican whose congressional district includes Allen, dismissed calls for gun laws after the shooting, and blamed mass shootings on people with mental health issues "that we're not taking care of"; when asked about people's claims that prayers do not prevent mass shootings, Self responded: "Those are people that don't believe in an almighty God who is absolutely in control of our lives. I'm a Christian. I believe that he is." Self's remark was criticized; for example, Shannon Watts, the founder of the advocacy group Moms Demand Action, responded: "Faith without works is dead. Prayers without action are empty." On May 11, after learning the details of Garcia's administrative release from the army, Self characterized him as "exactly the kind of person we're trying to keep weapons out of the hands of", and said that Garcia's ability to buy guns legally was a loophole that he intends to fix; however, Self denied that he was discussing a red flag law.

State senator Roland Gutierrez, whose district includes the site of the Robb Elementary School shooting, called for more gun control, writing, "There is a special place in hell for people who watch all this happen and choose to do nothing." Chris Hill, the county judge of the Collin County Commissioners' Court, expressed anger at "those that would do evil in our community, in our backyard".

Arizona Cardinals quarterback Kyler Murray, Seattle Seahawks safety Steven Terrell, Washington Commanders running back Jonathan Williams, and Detroit Lions defensive tackle Levi Onwuzurike—all alumni of Allen High School—released statements on Twitter. The Dallas Stars of the NHL canceled a watch party in front of the American Airlines Center for their third game against the Seattle Kraken in the NHL playoffs "out of respect for the victims, families, and community of Allen".

Other commentators expressed their outrage at the unfiltered and bloody photos of the deceased victims that spread across Twitter, without any filtering or warnings before a person could view them. While the images were visible for a period of time at or near the top of search results on the site, they were largely taken down by May 8, with edited clips of brief frames of the material and links leading to spam websites replacing them.

== See also ==
- List of mass shootings in the United States in 2023
- List of shootings in Texas
- Right-wing terrorism
- 2019 El Paso Walmart shooting
