= Theft of government property =

Criminal act of stealing property from federal, state or local governments

The theft of government property, also classified as stealing property from government officials, is the act of performing theft of property from federal, state or local governments; the crime is a felony in most areas. They include, though are not limited to: embezzlement, stealing any records, vouchers, money, etc. with intent to personally gain, convey or dispose of the material in question; possessing, the concealment of or keeping any materials of value while in knowledge of the fact these materials were stolen, embezzled or trafficked as contraband are also serious crimes.

== Examples of these criminal acts ==
Embezzlements of or stealing government property are almost always federal crimes in multiple countries. Acts of the earlier include though are not limited to: Converting, possessing or appropriating government properties for one's own personal uses, using government-issued vehicles or government issued computers with intent to use these devices privately.

The charges for theft of government property often carry maximum ten-year prison sentences and fines; however, if the properties are under $1,000 (in some countries, areas of the world), whosoever committed the crime only has a one-year sentence plus a fine.

== January 6th U.S. Capitol attack ==
Beginning from the late morning of January 6, thousands of people entered the U.S. Capitol in Washington, D.C. Hundreds were charged with stealing or destruction of government property; thirty were charged with the earlier, another forty with the latter.

Examples of property theft during these stormings include one mother and her son stealing laptop computers from the office of House Speaker Nancy Pelosi; also, ten South Carolinians were arrested. Almost half were charged under counts of government property theft. A female Capitol rioter who was observed lugging (carrying around) a 'members only' sign later pleaded guilty to lesser charges; the government property theft charges were dropped for her plea deal.

== Government property damage/destruction ==
The destruction of government property, or malicious mischief, means when people who aren't authorized to have such property (usually) deliberately damage or destroy the properties in question; normal punishment is a fine, that is up to $250,000 or five years' prison sentence.
