= Conspiracy to impede or injure a federal officer =

Conspiracy to impede or injure a federal officer is an American offense under 18 U.S.C. § 372. This provision is more than 100 years old and has been infrequently used. It was used in the prosecution of Edward and Elaine Brown, as well as in the prosecutions of the January 6 United States Capitol attack. The law also allows civil suits for conspiring to prevent a federal officer from discharging his duties.
