= Neal E. Kravitz =

American judge (born 1957)

Associate Judge of the Superior Court of the District of Columbia
- Incumbent
- Assumed office October 21, 1998
- President: Bill Clinton
- Preceded by: Paul Rainey Webber, III

Personal details
- Born: Neal Elliot Kravitz; October 18, 1957 (age 67); Fort McClellan, Anniston, Alabama, U.S.
- Education: Yale College (BA); Harvard University (JD)

Neal Elliot Kravitz (born October 18, 1957) is an associate judge of the Superior Court of the District of Columbia.

== Education and career ==
Kravitz earned his Bachelor of Arts from Yale College and his Juris Doctor from Harvard Law School.

After graduating, he served as a law clerk for Henry Anthony Politz on the United States Court of Appeals for the Fifth Circuit. In 1984, Kravitz joined the Public Defender Service for the District of Columbia as a staff attorney.

=== D.C. Superior Court ===
President Bill Clinton nominated Kravitz on May 1, 1998, to a fifteen-year term as an associate judge on the Superior Court of the District of Columbia to the seat vacated by Paul Rainey Webber, III. On September 3, 1998, the Senate Committee on Governmental Affairs held a hearing on his nomination. On September 24, 1998, the Committee reported his nomination favorably to the senate floor. On October 21, 1998, the full United States Senate confirmed his nomination by voice vote.

On August 21, 2013, the Commission on Judicial Disabilities and Tenure recommended that President Obama reappoint him to second fifteen-year term as a judge on the D.C. Superior Court.
