= List of cases of the January 6 United States Capitol attack (G-L) =

On January 6, 2021, thousands of Trump supporters participated in the U.S. Capitol attack, disrupting the joint session of Congress assembled to count electoral votes to formalize Joe Biden's victory in the 2020 United States presidential election.

By the end of the year, 725 people had been charged with federal crimes. That number rose to 1,000 by the second anniversary of the attack, to 1,200 by the third anniversary (three-quarters of whom had by then been found guilty) and to 1,500 before the fourth anniversary. As of January 20, 2025, 1,575 people had been charged in connection with the January 6 attack, of whom 1,021 had pleaded guilty and 249 had been convicted at trial.

Upon Donald Trump's inauguration on January 20, 2025, he pardoned all but 14 of those people. The remaining 14 people, though their convictions stood, were eligible for immediate release from prison, as he commuted their sentences to "time served." Following Trump's pardons, the United States Department of Justice (DOJ) moved to dismiss some cases awaiting trial or sentencing. In April 2026, DOJ prosecutors filed a request to vacate the felony convictions for four Proud Boys who had received commutations rather than pardons, and indicated an intention to make similar requests for other January 6 defendants who had received commutations.

After the pardon, some January 6 defendants and their survivors moved to sue the Department of Justice and federal law enforcement agencies. Most notably, the Department of Justice agreed to pay the family of Ashli Babbitt, who was fatally shot in the Capitol assault, $5 million in a lawsuit settlement. Other January 6 defendants have gone to court to have their sentencing fines refunded, or to file claims against the U.S. Department of Justice and other federal law enforcement agencies for injuries or property damage. In March 2026, some January 6 defendants and others present at the protest that day filed a class action lawsuit against the U.S. federal government, alleging that the U.S. Capitol Police and the Washington, D.C. Metropolitan Police Department caused the plaintiffs physical and emotional injuries while defending the Capitol.

In May 2026, a new "Anti-Weaponization Fund" was announced, setting aside $1.776 billion of public funds to distribute to Trump allies who claimed to be victims of federal "weaponization and lawfare”. This was described as part of a settlement to end Trump's lawsuit against the Internal Revenue Service. Facing pushback, however, the DOJ said it would not pursue the fund. A judge has demanded proof. Another judge sanctioned the attorneys.

Days after the fund was announced, the Department of Justice acknowledged it was removing news releases from its websites that had documented criminal charges, convictions and sentencings of January 6 rioters. It described these prosecutions as "the DOJ’s weaponization under the Biden administration" and the news releases about them as "partisan propaganda". Lawfare Media published the deleted Department of Justice press releases in a database; as of June 9, 2026, it contained over 5,700 restored documents.

== Previous sources of information ==
A list of "breach" cases, meaning cases in which the defendant was alleged to have entered a restricted area of the Capitol during the riot, was kept updated by the US Attorney's Office, District of Columbia. It was available until the morning of January 24, 2025, four days after President Trump had issued a blanket pardon, but later in the day, it said "Page not found." CNN reported its erasure the next day. Soon afterwards, some of the video evidence that had been part of court cases related to the prosecutions disappeared from a government server. A coalition of press organizations went to court over the missing evidence, and a judge subsequently ordered the government to stop removing the materials.

NPR has a database of all 1,575 cases in the Capitol attack prior to Trump's pardons, searchable by U.S. state, charges, and case status.

For plea deals entered between April–October 2021, BuzzFeed has a searchable table. After Trump's mass pardon in 2025, the Democratic Secretary of States Association launched a website to track the Capitol attackers' ongoing legal issues. Lawfare Media released a study on January 6 clemency recipients who were subsequently arrested or convicted of other crimes since the attack, finding 97 such cases as of June 4, 2026.

== Index ==
- List of cases of the January 6 United States Capitol attack (A-F)
- List of cases of the January 6 United States Capitol attack (G-L)
- List of cases of the January 6 United States Capitol attack (M-S)
- List of cases of the January 6 United States Capitol attack (T-Z)

== Table ==
Arrest date	Name	Charges	Pleas	Judgment	Notes
May 26, 2022	Levi Gable	Federal: Entering ... in a Restricted Building or Grounds; Disorderly ... in a Restricted Building or Grounds; Disorderly Conduct in a Capitol Building; Parading ... in a Capitol Building	Gable pleaded Guilty to one charge: Entering ... in a Restricted Building or Grounds. The other charges are dismissed.	Sentenced on 1/17/2023 to 24 months of probation; 45 days of location monitoring; 50 hours of community service; Special Assessment of $25; Fine of $1000; Restitution of $500.	Gable received a full pardon on January 20, 2025
April 23, 2021	Kevin Louis Galetto	Federal: Civil Disorder; Obstruction of an Official Proceeding; Assaulting ... Certain Officers; Entering ... Restricted Building or Grounds; Disorderly ... Restricted Building or Grounds; Engaging in Physical Violence in a Restricted Building or Grounds; Disorderly Conduct in a Capitol Building; Act of Physical Violence in the Capitol Grounds or Buildings	Pleaded guilty to assaulting, resisting or impeding law enforcement officers	Sentenced to 27 months in prison, 24 months of supervised release, and ordered to pay $2,000	61-year-old engineer and conservative activist from Westminster, California, arrested by the Los Angeles office of the FBI on charges that include the assault of a police officer during the January 6 riot. According to the FBI's charging documents, the suspect allegedly called for more rioters to enter the tunnel of the Capitol before entering himself, where he engaged in a confrontation with a Capitol Police officer whose body camera captured the man. The scuffle resulted in the officer being knocked down and losing his helmet.
May 06, 2024	James Gallagher	Federal: Entering ... in a Restricted Building or Grounds; Disorderly ... in a Restricted Building or Grounds; Disorderly Conduct in a Capitol Building or Grounds; Parading ... in a Capitol Building	Gallagher pleaded Not Guilty to all charges.	On 1/22/2025, the court grants the government's motion to dismiss the case with prejudice.	
January 13, 2021	Thomas Gallagher	Federal: Entering ... in a Restricted Building; Disorderly ... in a Restricted Building; Violent Entry and Disorderly Conduct in a Capitol Building; Parading ... in a Capitol Building	Gallagher pleaded Guilty to one charge: Parading ... in a Capitol Building. The other charges were dismissed.	Sentenced 11/4/2021 to 24 Months of Probation (with Conditions); Restitution of $500; Special Assessment of $10; 60 hours of community service.	Gallagher received a full pardon on January 20, 2025
May 06, 2024	Thomas Gallagher	Federal: Entering ... in a Restricted Building or Grounds; Disorderly ... in a Restricted Building or Grounds; Disorderly Conduct in a Capitol Building or Grounds; Parading ... in a Capitol Building	Gallagher pleaded Not Guilty to all charges.	On 1/22/2025, the court grants the government's motion to dismiss the case with prejudice.	
May 06, 2024	William Gallagher	Federal: Civil Disorder; Assaulting ... Certain Officers; Entering or Remaining in a Restricted Building or Grounds; Disorderly ... in a Restricted Building or Grounds; Disorderly Conduct in a Capitol Building or Grounds; Parading, Demonstrating, Picketing in a Capitol Building	Gallagher pleaded Not Guilty to all charges.	On 1/22/2025, the court grants the government's motion to dismiss the case with prejudice.	
September 27, 2022	Joei Leann Gallman	Federal: Parading ... in a Capitol Building	Gallman pleaded Guilty to the charge.	Sentenced on 8/21/2023 to 18 months of probation; Special Assessment of $10; Restitution of $500; Fine of $1,000; 50 hours of community service.	Gallman received a full pardon on January 20, 2025
September 27, 2022	William John Wyatt Gallman	Federal: Parading ... in a Capitol Building	Gallman pleaded Guilty to the charge.	Sentenced on 8/21/2023 to 18 months of probation; Special Assessment of $10; Restitution of $500; Fine of $1,000; 50 hours of community service.	Gallman received a full pardon on January 20, 2025
January 11, 2022	Andrew James Galloway	Federal: Entering ... in a Restricted Building; Disorderly ... in a Restricted Building; Disorderly Conduct in a Capitol Building; Parading ... in a Capitol Building	Galloway pleaded Guilty to one charge: Parading ... in a Capitol Building. The other charges are dismissed.	Sentenced on 10/12/2022 to 30 days incarceration; fine of $1,000; restitution of $500; special assessment of $10.	Galloway received a full pardon on January 20, 2025
September 16, 2024	August Garcia	Federal: Civil Disorder; Assaulting ... Certain Officers; Entering ... in a Restricted Building or Grounds; Disorderly ... in a Restricted Building or Grounds; Engaging in Physical Violence in a Restricted Building or Grounds; Disorderly Conduct in a Capitol Building; Act of Physical Violence in the Capitol Grounds or Buildings; Parading ... in a Capitol Building		On 1/21/2025, the court grants the government's motion to dismiss the case with prejudice.	
January 19, 2021	Gabriel A. Garcia	Federal: Civil Disorder; Obstruction of an Official Proceeding; Entering ... in a Restricted Building or Grounds; Disorderly ... in a Restricted Building or Grounds; Disorderly Conduct in a Capitol Building; Parading ... in the Capitol Buildings	Garcia pleaded Not Guilty to all charges. In a Stipulated Bench Trial on 11/20/2023 he was found Guilty on two counts: Civil Disorder; Obstruction of an Official Proceeding. The government dismissed the Obstruction conviction.	Sentenced on 12/6/2024 to 12 months incarceration; 24 months of supervised release; $2,000 in restitution; $100 Special Assessment.	Garcia received a full pardon on January 20, 2025
March 18, 2022	Jacob Elias Garcia	Federal: Entering ... in a Restricted Building; Disorderly ... in a Restricted Building; Disorderly Conduct in a Capitol Building; Parading ... in a Capitol Building	Garcia pleaded Guilty to one charge: Parading ... in a Capitol Building.	Sentenced on 1/26/2023 to 24 months of probation, 30 days of intermittent confinement; $500 in restitution and $10 special assessment. On 7/17/2024, Court to order defendant to complete 240 hours of community service before completion of probation.	Garcia received a full pardon on January 20, 2025
June 25, 2021	Mitchell Todd Gardner II	Federal: Civil Disorder; Obstruction of an Official Proceeding and Aiding and Abetting; Assaulting ... Certain Officers Using a Dangerous Weapon; Destruction of Government Property; Entering ... in a Restricted Building or Grounds; Disorderly ... in a Restricted Building or Grounds; Engaging in Physical Violence in a Restricted Building or Grounds; Disorderly Conduct in a Capitol Building; Act of Physical Violence in the Capitol Grounds or Buildings; Parading ... in a Capitol Building	Gardner pleaded Guilty to three charges: Civil Disorder; Obstruction of an Official Proceeding and Aiding and Abetting; Assaulting ... Certain Officers Using a Dangerous Weapon. The other charges are dismissed.	Sentenced on 3/16/2023 to 55 months of incarceration; 36 months of supervised release; 100 hours of community service; $3,500 restitution; $300 special assessment.	Gardner received a full pardon on January 20, 2025
June 26, 2024	Troy Vincent Garrett	Federal: Civil Disorder	Garrett pleaded Guilty to the charge.	Sentencing set for 5/6/2025. On 1/22/2025, the court grants the government's motion to dismiss the case with prejudice.	
January 19, 2024	David Michael Gary	Federal: Disorderly ... in a Restricted Building or Grounds	Gary pleaded Guilty to the single charge.	Sentencing set for 1/23/2025. On 1/22/2025, the court grants the government's motion to dismiss the case with prejudice	
August 07, 2023	Lowell Gates	Federal: Civil Disorder; Assaulting ... Certain Officers Using a Dangerous Weapon; Entering ... in a Restricted Building or Grounds with a Deadly or Dangerous Weapon; Disorderly ... in a Restricted Building or Grounds with a Deadly or Dangerous Weapon; Engaging in Physical Violence in a Restricted Building or Grounds with a Deadly or Dangerous Weapon; Disorderly Conduct in a Capitol Building; Act of Physical Violence in the Capitol Grounds or Buildings	Gates pleaded Not Guilty to all charges.	Jury trial set for 4/14/2025. On 1/27/2025, the court grants the government's motion to dismiss the case with prejudice.	
July 13, 2023	Spencer Sidney Geller	Federal: Obstruction of Law Enforcement During Civil Disorder; Entering ... in a Restricted Building or Grounds; Disorderly ... in a Restricted Building or Grounds; Disorderly Conduct in a Capitol Building; Parading ... in a Capitol Building		On 1/22/2025, the court grants the government's motion to dismiss the case with prejudice.	
February 27, 2021	Raechel Genco	Federal: Violent Entry and Disorderly Conduct in the Capitol Grounds	Genco pleaded Guilty to the single charge.	Sentenced on 9/27/2022 to 12 months of probation, 60 hours of community service, $500 restitution; $10 special assessment.	Genco received a full pardon on January 20, 2025
July 15, 2021	Edward George, Jr.	Federal: Obstruction of an Official Proceeding; Entering ... in a Restricted Building or Grounds; Disorderly ... in a Restricted Building or Grounds; Entering ... in the Gallery of Congress; Disorderly Conduct in a Capitol Building; Parading ... in a Capitol Building; Civil Disorder; Assaulting ... Certain Officers; Theft of Government Property	George pleaded Not Guilty to all charges. The court dismisses the Obstruction charge on 12/2/2024.	Jury trial set for 5/19/2025. On 1/22/2025, the court grants the government's motion to dismiss the case with prejudice	
January 28, 2021	Christina Gerding	Federal: Entering ... in a Restricted Building or Grounds; Disorderly ... in a Restricted Building or Grounds; Disorderly Conduct in a Capitol Building; Parading ... in a Capitol Building	Gerding pleaded Guilty to one charge: Parading ... in a Capitol Building. The other charges are dismissed.	Sentenced on 5/16/2023 to 24 months probation; $10 special assessment; $500 restitution; 60 hours of community service.	Gerding received a full pardon on January 20, 2025
January 28, 2021	Jason Gerding	Federal: Entering ... in a Restricted Building or Grounds; Disorderly ... in a Restricted Building or Grounds; Disorderly Conduct in a Capitol Building; Parading ... in a Capitol Building	Gerding pleaded Guilty to one charge: Parading ... in a Capitol Building. The other charges are dismissed.	Sentenced on 5/16/2023 to 24 months probation; $10 special assessment; $500 restitution; 60 hours of community service.	Gerding received a full pardon on January 20, 2025
February 08, 2022	Eric Gerwatowski	Federal: Civil Disorder; Entering ... in a Restricted Building or Grounds; Disorderly ... in a Restricted Building or Grounds; Disorderly Conduct in a Capitol Building; Parading ... in a Capitol Building	Gerwatowski pleaded Guilty to one charge: Civil Disorder. The other charges are dismissed.	Sentenced on 3/9/2023 to 24 months of probation; 30 days location monitoring; 60 hours of community service; $100 Special Assessment; Restitution of $2,000.	Gerwatowski received a full pardon on January 20, 2025
June 15, 2021	John Hubert Getsinger Jr.	Federal: Entering ... in a Restricted Building; Disorderly ... in a Restricted Building; Violent Entry and Disorderly Conduct; Parading ... in a Capitol Building	Getsinger pleaded Guilty to one charge: Parading ... in a Capitol Building. The other charges are dismissed.	Sentenced 7/12/2022 to 60 days incarceration; 3 years Probation; Restitution of $500; Special Assessment of $10.	Getsinger received a full pardon on January 20, 2025
November 05, 2024	Robert Mark Giacchetti	Federal: Assaulting ... Certain Officers	Giacchetti pleaded Guilty to the charge.	Sentencing set for 6/3/2025. On 2/10/2025, the court ordered that the case is dismissed without prejudice	
December 01, 2021	Michael Gianos	Federal: Entering ... in a Restricted Building or Grounds; Disorderly ... in a Restricted Building or Grounds; Disorderly Conduct in a Capitol Building; Parading ... in a Capitol Building	Gianos pleaded Guilty to one charge: Entering ... in a Restricted Building or Grounds. The other charges are dismissed.	Sentenced on 7/25/2023 to 24 months of Probation; first 30 days in home detention; Special Assessment of $25; Restitution of $500; 50 hours of community service. Gianos received a full pardon on January 20, 2025	
March 13, 2023	Larry Fife Giberson Jr.	Federal: Civil Disorder	Guilty – one charge: Civil Disorder. Misdemeanor charges were dropped.	Sentenced to two months in prison, six months of supervised release under home detention, $100 in special assessment and $2,000 in restitution.	Giberson was a sophomore at Princeton University on January 6, 2021. Prior to his sentencing, Giberson graduated in 2023 with a Bachelor's degree in Politics and certificates in Values and Public Life and French. According to Giberson, Princeton never reached out to him regarding his case.
December 10, 2021	Isaiah Giddings	Federal: Disorderly ... in a Restricted Building or Grounds	Giddings pleaded Guilty to the single charge.	Sentencing set for 1/27/2025. On 1/21/2025, the court grants the government's motion to dismiss the case with prejudice	
January 18, 2021	Robert Gieswein	Federal: Obstruction of an Official Proceeding and Aiding and Abetting; Civil Disorder and Aiding and Abetting; Assaulting, Resisting, Or Impeding Certain Officers; Assaulting ... Certain Officers Using a Dangerous Weapon (3 counts); Civil Disorder and Aiding and Abetting; Assaulting ... Certain Officers Using a Dangerous Weapon (2 counts); Destruction of Government Property and Aiding and Abetting; Entering ... in a Restricted Building or Grounds with a Deadly or Dangerous Weapon	Gieswein pleaded Guilty to two charges: Assaulting ... Certain Officers Using a Dangerous Weapon (2 counts). The other charges are dismissed.	Sentenced on 6/23/2023 to 48 months incarceration; 3 years supervised release; $2,000 restitution; Special Assessment of $200.	Gieswein received a full pardon on January 20, 2025
May 11, 2022	David Joseph Gietzen	Federal: Civil Disorder and Aiding and Abetting; Assaulting ... Certain Officers (2 counts); Assaulting ... Certain Officers Using a Dangerous Weapon; Entering ... in a Restricted Building or Grounds with a Deadly or Dangerous Weapon; Disorderly ... in a Restricted Building or Grounds with a Deadly or Dangerous Weapon; Engaging in Physical Violence in a Restricted Building or Grounds with a Deadly or Dangerous Weapon; Act of Physical Violence in the Capitol Grounds or Buildings	Gietzen pleaded Not Guilty to all charges. Found Guilty on all charges in a Jury trial on 8/31/2023.	Sentenced on 4/23/2024 to 72 Months of Incarceration; Supervised Release of 36 Months; 100 hours community service; Special Assessment of $710.	Gietzen received a full pardon on January 20, 2025
December 12, 2023	Tony Lee Gill	Federal: Entering ... in a Restricted Building or Grounds; Disorderly ... in a Restricted Building or Grounds; Disorderly Conduct in a Capitol Building; Parading ... in a Capitol Building	Gill pleaded Guilty to one charge: Entering ... in a Restricted Building or Grounds. The other charges are dismissed.	Sentenced on 7/10/2024 to 45 days incarceration; 6 months of Supervised Release; $500 in Restitution; $1,000 fine; Special Assessment of $25; 60 hours of community service.	Gill received a full pardon on January 20, 2025
February 18, 2022	Vincent J. Gillespie	Federal: Assaulting ... Certain Officers; Civil Disorder; Entering ... in a Restricted Building or Grounds; Disorderly ... in a Restricted Building or Grounds; Engaging in Physical Violence in a Restricted Building or Grounds; Disorderly Conduct in a Capitol Building; Act of Physical Violence in the Capitol Grounds or Buildings; Obstruction of an Official Proceeding	Gillespie pleaded Not Guilty to all charges. Jury trial held from 12/19/2022 to 12/23/2022. Found Guilty on 4 charges: Assaulting ... Certain Officers; Civil Disorder; Engaging in Physical Violence in a Restricted Building or Grounds; Act of Physical Violence in the Capitol Grounds or Buildings. A mistrial declared on the remaining charges.	Sentenced on 4/14/2023 to 68 months incarceration; 36 months supervised release; $235 special assessment; $2,000 restitution; $25,000 fine.	Gillespie received a full pardon on January 20, 2025
January 30, 2024	Lee A. Giobbie	Federal: Obstruction of an Official Proceeding; Civil Disorder; Entering ... in a Restricted Building or Grounds; Disorderly ... in a Restricted Building or Grounds; Disorderly Conduct in a Capitol Building; Parading ... in a Capitol Building	Giobbie pleaded Not Guilty to all charges. On 8/6/2024, the court dismissed the Obstruction charge.	Jury trial set for 2/3/2025. On 1/21/2025, the court grants the government's motion to dismiss the case with prejudice	
January 15, 2021	Tim Gionet ("Baked Alaska")	Federal: Knowingly Entering ... Restricted Building or grounds without Lawful Entry; Violent Entry and Disorderly Conduct on Capitol Grounds	Pleaded guilty to one count of parading. demonstrating or picketing in the Capitol building	Two months in jail, a $2,000 fine and $500 in restitution	Far-right activist, arrested by the FBI in Houston, Texas.
January 15, 2025	Frank Peter Molinari Giorgi, Jr.	Federal: Obstruction of Law Enforcement During Civil Disorder; Assaulting ... Certain Officers; Knowingly Entering or Remaining in any Restricted Building or Grounds Without Lawful Authority; Disorderly ... in a Restricted Building or Grounds; Engaging in Physical Violence in a Restricted Building or Grounds; Disorderly Conduct in a Capitol Building; Act of Physical Violence in the Capitol Grounds or Buildings		On 1/22/2025, the court grants the government's motion to dismiss the case with prejudice.	
February 22, 2024	Kenneth Giusini	Federal: Civil Disorder	Giusini pleaded Guilty to the charge.	Sentencing reset for 2/7/2025. On 1/23/2025, the court ordered that the case is dismissed without prejudice.	
January 11, 2022	Frank Rocco Giustino	Federal: Entering ... in a Restricted Building; Disorderly ... in a Restricted Building; Violent Entry and Disorderly Conduct in a Capitol Building; Parading ... in a Capitol Building	Giustino pleaded Guilty to one charge: Parading ... in a Capitol Building. The other charges are dismissed.	Sentenced on 11/21/2023 to 90 days incarceration; a $10 Special Assessment; Restitution totaling $500.	Giustino received a full pardon on January 20, 2025
September 02, 2021	Marcos Gleffe	Federal: Entering ... in a Restricted Building; Disorderly ... in a Restricted Building; Violent Entry and Disorderly Conduct in a Capitol Building; Parading ... in a Capitol Building	Gleffe pleaded Guilty to one charge: Parading ... in a Capitol Building. The other charges are dismissed.	Sentenced on 2/10/2023 to 36 months of Probation; 60 days home detention; 60 hours community service; Special Assessment of $10; Fine of $500; Restitution of $500.	Gleffe received a full pardon on January 20, 2025
September 13, 2023	Billy Joe Gober	Federal: Civil Disorder; Assaulting ... Certain Officers (2 counts); Entering ... in a Restricted Building or Grounds; Disorderly ... in a Restricted Building or Grounds; Engaging in Physical Violence in a Restricted Building or Grounds; Disorderly Conduct in a Capitol Building; Act of Physical Violence in the Capitol Grounds or Buildings	Gober pleaded Not Guilty to all charges.	Jury trial set for 3/3/2025. On 1/23/2025, the court grants the government's motion to dismiss the case with prejudice.	
May 09, 2024	Darrell Wayne Goins	Federal: Civil Disorder; Assaulting ... Certain Officers Using a Dangerous Weapon; Assaulting ... Certain Officers; Entering ... in a Restricted Building or Grounds with a Deadly or Dangerous Weapon; Disorderly ... in a Restricted Building or Grounds with a Deadly or Dangerous Weapon; Engaging in Physical Violence in a Restricted Building or Grounds with a Deadly or Dangerous Weapon; Disorderly Conduct in a Capitol Building; Act of Physical Violence in the Capitol Grounds or Buildings; Parading ... in a Capitol Building	Goins pleaded Not Guilty to all charges.	On 1/27/2025, the court grants the government's motion to dismiss the case with prejudice.	
January 18, 2021	Simone Gold	Federal: Obstruction of an Official Proceeding; Entering ... Restricted Building or Grounds; Disorderly ... Restricted Building or Grounds; Disorderly Conduct in a Capitol Building; Parading ... in a Capitol Building	Not Guilty – all charges	60 days in prison, 12 months’ supervised release, $9,500 fine, $500 restitution	Physician, attorney, author, and founder of America's Frontline Doctors, an American right-wing political organization known for spreading misinformation about the COVID-19 pandemic. Arrested at her home in Beverly Hills, California.
December 09, 2024	George Gonzalez	Federal: Civil Disorder; Assaulting ... Certain Officers; Destruction of Government Property; Entering ... in a Restricted Building or Grounds; Disorderly ... in a Restricted Building or Grounds; Engaging in Physical Violence in a Restricted Building or Grounds; Disorderly Conduct in a Capitol Building; Act of Physical Violence in the Capitol Grounds or Buildings; Parading ... in a Capitol Building	Gonzalez pleaded Not Guilty to all charges.	On 1/23/2025, the court ordered that the case is dismissed without prejudice.	
January 08, 2024	Mario Salvador Gonzalez	Federal: Civil Disorder; Assaulting ... Certain Officers; Entering ... in a Restricted Building or Grounds; Disorderly ... in a Restricted Building or Grounds; Disorderly Conduct in a Capitol Building	Gonzalez pleaded Not Guilty to all charges.	On 1/22/2025, the court grants the government's motion to dismiss the case with prejudice	
January 29, 2021	Daniel Goodwyn	Federal: Obstruction of an Official Proceeding; Entering ... in a Restricted Building or Grounds; Disorderly ... in a Restricted Building or Grounds; Disorderly Conduct in a Capitol Building; Parading ... in a Capitol Building	Goodwyn pleaded Guilty to one charge: Entering ... in a Restricted Building or Grounds. The other charges are dismissed.	Sentenced on 6/6/2023 to 60 Days of incarceration with credit for time served; 1 Year of Supervised Release; Special Assessment of $25; restitution of $500; Fine of $2,500.	Goodwyn received a full pardon on January 20, 2025
March 19, 2024	Amy Nicole Gordon	Federal: Entering ... in a Restricted Building or Grounds; Disorderly ... in a Restricted Building or Grounds; Disorderly Conduct in a Capitol Building or Grounds; Parading ... in a Capitol Building	Gordon pleaded Not Guilty to all charges. Found Guilty on all charges in a Jury trial on 12/18/2024.	Sentencing set for 3/19/2025. On 1/21/2025, the court grants the government's motion to dismiss the case with prejudice.	
July 08, 2022	John Thomas Gordon	Federal: Civil Disorder	Gordon pleaded Guilty to Civil Disorder.	Sentenced on 3/13/2023 to 6 months of incarceration; 24 months of supervised release; 180 days of home confinement; Special Assessment of $100; Restitution of $2,000.	Gordon received a full pardon on January 20, 2025
January 14, 2021	Vaughn Gordon	Federal: Entering ... in a Restricted Building; Disorderly ... in a Restricted Building; Violent Entry and Disorderly Conduct in a Capitol Building; Parading ... in a Capitol Building	Gordon pleaded Guilty to one charge: Parading ... in a Capitol Building. The other charges are dismissed.	Sentenced 2/24/2023 to 90 days home confinement; 36 months probation, 90 hours of community service, $500 restitution; $10 special assessment.	Gordon received a full pardon on January 20, 2025
December 12, 2023	Bart Gore	Federal: Conspiracy to Impede or Injure Officers; Entering ... in a Restricted Building or Grounds; Disorderly ... in a Restricted Building or Grounds; Disorderly Conduct in a Capitol Building; Parading ... in a Capitol Building	Gore pleaded Not Guilty to all charges.	On 1/21/2025, the court grants the government's motion to dismiss the case with prejudice	
November 21, 2024	Patrick Gorski	Federal: Obstruction of Law Enforcement During Civil Disorder; Entering ... in a Restricted Building or Grounds; Disorderly ... in a Restricted Building or Grounds; Disorderly Conduct in a Capitol Building; Parading ... in a Capitol Building		On 1/22/2025, the court grants the government's motion to dismiss the case with prejudice.	
January 18, 2021	Vitali GossJankowski	Federal: Civil Disorder; Obstruction of an Official Proceeding; Assaulting ... Certain Officers Using a Dangerous Weapon; Entering ... in a Restricted Building or Grounds with a Deadly or Dangerous Weapon; Disorderly ... in a Restricted Building or Grounds with a Deadly or Dangerous Weapon; Disorderly Conduct in a Capitol Building	GossJankowski pleaded Not Guilty to all charges. In a Jury trial concluded on 3/16/2023, he was found Guilty on three charges: Civil Disorder; Obstruction of an Official Proceeding; Disorderly Conduct in a Capitol Building. Also Guilty on three lesser charges: Assaulting ... Certain Officers; Entering ... in a Restricted Building or Grounds; Disorderly ... in a Restricted Building or Grounds. The court dismissed the Obstruction conviction on 8/2/2024.	Sentencing set for 3/4/2025. On 1/22/2025, the court ordered that the case is dismissed without prejudice.	
October 12, 2022	Caden Paul Gottfried	Federal: Assaulting ... Certain Officers; Civil Disorder; Entering ... in a Restricted Building or Grounds; Disorderly ... in a Restricted Building or Grounds; Engaging in Physical Violence in a Restricted Building or Grounds; Act of Physical Violence in the Capitol Grounds or Buildings	Gottfried pleaded Not Guilty to all charges.	Bench trial held and verdict set for 1/28/2025. On 1/21/2025, the court grants the government's motion to dismiss the case with prejudice.	
March 15, 2022	John David Ross Gould	Federal: Entering ... in a Restricted Building; Disorderly ... in a Restricted Building; Violent Entry and Disorderly Conduct in a Capitol Building; Parading ... in a Capitol Building	Gould pleaded Guilty to one charge: Parading ... in a Capitol Building. The other charges are dismissed.	Sentenced on 4/28/2023 to 12 months probation; 2 months home confinement/location monitoring; 60 hours of community service restitution of $500; special assessment of $10.	Gould received a full pardon on January 20, 2025
February 04, 2021	Jeffrey Grace	Federal: Entering ... in a Restricted Building or Grounds; Disorderly ... in a Restricted Building or Grounds; Disorderly Conduct in a Capitol Building; Parading ... in a Capitol Building	Grace pleaded Guilty to one charge: Entering ... in a Restricted Building or Grounds. The other charges are dismissed.	Sentenced on 8/3/2023 to 75 days incarceration; 12 months supervised release; $500 restitution; $25 special assessment. Grace received a full pardon on January 20, 2025	
May 26, 2021	Jeremy Grace	Federal: Entering ... in a Restricted Building or Grounds; Disorderly ... in a Restricted Building or Grounds; Disorderly Conduct in a Capitol Building; Parading ... in a Capitol Building	Grace pleaded Guilty to one charge: Entering ... in a Restricted Building or Grounds. The other charges are dismissed.	Sentenced 7/8/2022 to 21 days incarceration; 12 months supervised release; 60 hours community service; $500 restitution; $25 special assessment.	Grace received a full pardon on January 20, 2025
March 30, 2023	Jonathan David Grace	Federal: Civil Disorder; Assaulting ... Certain Officers; Entering ... in a Restricted Building or Grounds; Disorderly ... in a Restricted Building or Grounds; Engaging in Physical Violence in a Restricted Building or Grounds; Impeding Passage through the Capitol Grounds or Buildings; Act of Physical Violence in the Capitol Grounds or Buildings	Grace pleaded Guilty to one charge: Assaulting ... Certain Officers. The other charges are dismissed.	Sentenced on 1/30/2024 to 24 months incarceration; 3 years of supervised release; $5,000 in fines; $2,000 in restitution; $100 special assessment.	Grace received a full pardon on January 20, 2025
June 20, 2024	Daryl Steven Graham	Federal: Disorderly Conduct in a Capitol Building; Parading ... in a Capitol Building	Graham pleaded Guilty to both charges.	Sentenced on 11/21/2024 to 9 months of Probation; $20 Special Assessment; Restitution in the amount of $500; 100 hours of community service.	Graham received a full pardon on January 20, 2025.
October 14, 2021	James Tate Grant	Federal: Civil Disorder; Assaulting ... Certain Officers Using a Dangerous Weapon, Inflicting Bodily Injury and Aiding and Abetting (2 counts); Entering ... in a Restricted Building or Grounds with a Deadly or Dangerous Weapon; Disorderly ... in a Restricted Building or Grounds with a Deadly or Dangerous Weapon; Engaging in Physical Violence in a Restricted Building or Grounds with a Deadly or Dangerous Weapon, Resulting in Significant Bodily Injury, and Aiding and Abetting; Disorderly Conduct in a Capitol Building or Grounds; Act of Physical Violence in the Capitol Grounds or Buildings and Aiding and Abetting; Obstruction of an Official Proceeding and Aiding and Abetting; Entering ... in Certain Rooms in the Capitol Building; Parading ... in a Capitol Building	Grant pleaded Guilty to two charges: Entering ... in Certain Rooms in the Capitol Building; and Parading ... in a Capitol Building. Bench trial verdict on 2/2/2024 finds him Guilty on five charges: Civil Disorder; Assaulting ... Certain Officers Using a Dangerous Weapon, Inflicting Bodily Injury, and Aiding and Abetting; Disorderly Conduct in a Capitol Building or Grounds; Act of Physical Violence in the Capitol Grounds or Buildings and Aiding and Abetting; Obstruction of an Official Proceeding and Aiding and Abetting. Not Guilty on four charges. On 9/3/2024, the Court orders dismissal of the Obstruction conviction.	Sentenced on 9/19/2024 to 36 months incarceration; 36 months supervised release; $2,000 restitution; $240 special assessment.	Grant received a full pardon on January 20, 2025
May 18, 2021	Daniel Paul Gray	Federal: Civil Disorder; Obstruction of an Official Proceeding; Assaulting ... Certain Officers; Entering ... in a Restricted Building or Grounds; Disorderly ... in a Restricted Building or Grounds; Engaging in Physical Violence in a Restricted Building or Grounds; Disorderly Conduct in a Capitol Building; Act of Physical Violence in the Capitol Grounds or Buildings; Parading ... in a Capitol Building	Gray pleaded Guilty to two charges: Obstruction of an Official Proceeding; and Assaulting ... Certain Officers. The other charges are dismissed.	Sentenced on 2/16/2024 to 30 months of incarceration; 36 months of Supervised Release; special assessment of $200; restitution in the amount of $2,000; 200 hours of community service.	Gray received a full pardon on January 20, 2025
June 15, 2022	Leslie Gray	Federal: Civil Disorder; Obstruction of an Official Proceeding and Aiding and Abetting; Entering ... in a Restricted Building or Grounds; Disorderly ... in a Restricted Building or Grounds; Disorderly Conduct in a Capitol Building; Parading ... in a Capitol Building	Gray pleaded Guilty to one charge: Obstruction of an Official Proceeding and Aiding and Abetting. The other charges are dismissed.	Sentenced on 10/23/2023 to 12 months and one day of incarceration; 12 months of supervised release; $2,000 restitution; $100 special assessment.	Gray received a full pardon on January 20, 2025
January 26, 2021	Kenneth Grayson	Federal: Civil Disorder	Grayson pleaded Guilty to the single charge.	Sentenced on 12/19/2022 to 2 months incarceration; 2 years of supervised release; Special Assessment of $100 and Restitution of $2,000. Grayson received a full pardon on January 20, 2025	
April 01, 2024	Leah Eva Green	Federal: Disorderly Conduct in a Capitol Building or Grounds; Parading ... in a Capitol Building	Green pleaded Guilty to both charges.	Sentenced on 8/28/2024 to 7 days incarceration; 36 months of Probation; $500 in Restitution; $20 Special Assessment.	Green received a full pardon on January 20, 2025.
April 21, 2021	Matthew Greene	Federal: Conspiracy; Obstruction of an Official Proceeding and Aiding and Abetting; Obstruction of Law Enforcement During Civil Disorder and Aiding and Abetting; Destruction of Government Property and Aiding and Abetting; Entering ... in a Restricted Building or Grounds; Disorderly Conduct in a Restricted Building or Grounds and Aiding and Abetting	Greene pleaded Guilty to two charges: Conspiracy and Obstruction of an Official Proceeding.	On 1/22/2025, the court grants the government's motion to dismiss the case with prejudice.	
June 23, 2022	Michael L. Greene	Federal: Conspiracy to Obstruct an Official Proceeding; Obstruction of an Official Proceeding and Aiding and Abetting; Conspiracy to Prevent an Officer from Discharging Any Duties; Entering ... in a Restricted Building or Grounds; Tampering with Documents of Proceedings	Greene pleaded Not Guilty to all charges. Found Guilty on one charge: Entering ... in a Restricted Building or Grounds. Found Not Guilty on three charges; and a hung jury was declared on one charge: Obstruction of an Official Proceeding. That charge was dismissed.	Sentenced on 7/21/2023 to 24 months probation; 60 hours of community service; $25 special assessment.	Greene received a full pardon on January 20, 2025
January 21, 2021	Christopher Ray Grider	Federal: Civil Disorder; Obstruction of an Official Proceeding; Destruction of Government Property; Entering ... in a Restricted Building or Grounds; Disorderly ... in a Restricted Building or Grounds; Engaging in Physical Violence in a Restricted Building or Grounds; Disorderly Conduct in a Capitol Building; Act of Physical Violence in the Capitol Grounds or Buildings; Parading ... in a Capitol Building	Grider pleaded Pleaded Guilty to two charges on 12/12/2022: Entering ... in a Restricted Building or Grounds; and Parading ... in a Capitol Building. A Bench Trial was held on the remaining charges. On 12/21/2022, Grider was found Guilty on the remaining 7 charges.	Sentenced on 5/24/2023 to 83 months in prison, 36 months of supervised release; a $812 fine; restitution of $5,044; special assessment of $405. Grider received a full pardon on January 20, 2025	
January 17, 2021	Couy Griffin	Federal: Entering ... in a Restricted Building or Grounds; Disorderly ... in a Restricted Building or Grounds	Griffin pleaded Not Guilty to both charges. A Bench Trial was held on March 21 and 22, 2022. Griffin was found Guilty of one count, Entering ... in a Restricted Building or Grounds; and Not Guilty of the second count, Disruptive Conduct in a Restricted Building or Grounds.	Sentenced on 6/17/2022 to 14 days incarceration (credit for time already served); 1 year supervised release; 60 hours community service; $3,000 fine; $500 restitution; $25 special assessment. Griffin received a full pardon on January 20, 2025	
March 07, 2024	Jason H. Griffin	Federal: Entering ... in a Restricted Building or Grounds; Disorderly ... in a Restricted Building or Grounds; Disorderly Conduct in a Capitol Building or Grounds; Parading ... in a Capitol Building	Griffin pleaded Guilty to one charge: Entering ... in a Restricted Building or Grounds.	Sentencing set for 3/6/2025. On 1/22/2025, the court grants the government's motion to dismiss the case with prejudice	
March 04, 2021	Anthony Alfred Griffith Sr.	Federal: Entering ... in a Restricted Building or Grounds; Disorderly ... in a Restricted Building or Grounds; Disorderly Conduct in a Capitol Building; Parading ... in a Capitol Building	Griffith pleaded Not Guilty to all charges. On 5/16/2023 he was found Guilty in a Bench trial on all four charges.	Sentenced on 9/1/2023 to 6 Months incarceration; 12 Months of Supervised Release; Special Assessment of $70; restitution of $500.	Griffith received a full pardon on January 20, 2025
January 16, 2021	Jack Jesse Griffith	Federal: Entering ... in a Restricted Building or Grounds; Disorderly ... in a Restricted Building or Grounds; Disorderly Conduct in a Capitol Building; Parading ... in a Capitol Building	Griffith pleaded Guilty to one charge: Parading ... in a Capitol Building. The other charges were dismissed.	Sentenced 10/28/2021 to 36 months Probation which includes 90 days of home confinement (an additional 14 days was added due to probation violations); $10.00 special assessment; restitution in the amount of $500.	Griffith received a full pardon on January 20, 2025
February 23, 2021	Philip Sean Grillo	Federal: Obstruction of an Official Proceeding; Entering ... in a Restricted Building or Grounds; Disorderly ... in a Restricted Building or Grounds; Disorderly Conduct in a Capitol Building; Parading ... in a Capitol Building	Grillo pleaded Not Guilty to all charges. Found Guilty on all charges in a Jury trial on 12/5/2023. On 11/25/2024, the court dismissed the Obstruction conviction.	Sentenced on 12/6/2024 to 12 months incarceration; 12 months of supervised release; restitution of $500; special assessment of $70.	Grillo received a full pardon on January 20, 2025
March 05, 2021	Andrew William Griswold	Federal: Civil Disorder	Griswold pleaded Guilty to the single charge.	Sentenced 7/13/22 to 75 days incarceration; two years of supervised release, $2,000 restitution; $100 special assessment.	Griswold received a full pardon on January 20, 2025
June 23, 2021	Mark Grods	Federal: Conspiracy; Obstruction of an Official Proceeding and Aiding and Abetting	Guilty – Conspiracy and Obstruction Of An Official Proceeding. (June 30, 2021)		Third member of the Oath Keepers to plead guilty for his role in the riot.
February 25, 2021	Jeremy Daniel Groseclose	Federal: Civil Disorder; Obstruction of an Official Proceeding; Entering ... in a Restricted Building or Grounds; Disorderly ... in a Restricted Building or Grounds; Disorderly Conduct in a Capitol Building; Parading ... in a Capitol Building	Groseclose pleaded Not Guilty to all charges. Bench trial verdict on 11/22/2023 finds him Guilty on four counts: Civil Disorder; Obstruction of an Official Proceeding; Disorderly Conduct in a Capitol Building; and Parading ... in a Capitol Building. Acquitted on the other two charges. On 8/5/2024, the court dismissed the Obstruction charge.	Sentenced on 10/2/2024 to 40 months incarceration; 24 months Supervised Release; $120 Special Assessment; fine of $5,000.	Groseclose received a full pardon on January 20, 2025
January 18, 2022	Juliano Gross	Federal: Entering ... in a Restricted Building or Grounds; Disorderly ... in a Restricted Building or Grounds; Disorderly Conduct in a Capitol Building; Parading ... in a Capitol Building	Gross pleaded Guilty to one charge: Parading ... in a Capitol Building. The other charges are dismissed.	Sentenced on 12/9/2022 to 24 months probation; 45 days location monitoring; 100 hours community service; $500 restitution; $10 special assessment.	Gross received a full pardon on January 20, 2025
April 28, 2021	Logan Grover	Federal: Entering ... in a Restricted Building or Grounds; Disorderly ... in a Restricted Building or Grounds; Disorderly Conduct in a Capitol Building or Grounds; Parading ... in a Capitol Building	Grover pleaded Guilty to one charge: Parading ... in a Capitol Building. The other charges are dismissed.	Sentenced on 2/17/2023 to 24 months of probation; as a condition of his probation, the defendant is sentenced to 30 days home incarceration; 100 hours community service; $500 restitution; $10 special assessment.	Grover received a full pardon on January 20, 2025
June 01, 2021	Leonard Gruppo	Federal: Entering ... in a Restricted Building; Disorderly ... in a Restricted Building; Violent Entry and Disorderly Conduct in a Capitol Building; Parading ... in a Capitol Building	Gruppo pleaded Guilty to one charge: Parading ... in a Capitol Building. The other charges were dismissed.	Sentenced 10/29/2021 to 24 months probation; 90 days home detention/location monitoring; $10 special assessment; $500 restitution, and $3,000 fine.	Gruppo received a full pardon on January 20, 2025
September 12, 2024	Justina Nicole Guardino	Federal: Entering ... in a Restricted Building or Grounds; Disorderly ... in a Restricted Building or Grounds; Disorderly Conduct on Capitol Grounds; Parading ... in a Capitol Building	Guardino pleaded Not Guilty to all charges.	On 1/23/2025, the court ordered that the case is dismissed without prejudice	
August 06, 2024	Samuel Guizio	Federal: Entering ... in a Restricted Building or Grounds; Disorderly ... in a Restricted Building or Grounds; Disorderly Conduct in a Capitol Building or Grounds; Parading ... in a Capitol Building	Guizio pleaded Guilty to two counts: Disorderly Conduct in a Capitol Building or Grounds; Parading ... in a Capitol Building.	Sentencing set for 1/23/2025. On 1/22/2025, the court grants the government's motion to dismiss the case with prejudice.	
August 10, 2021	Derek Cooper Gunby	Federal: Obstruction of an Official Proceeding; Entering ... in a Restricted Building or Grounds; Disorderly ... in a Restricted Building or Grounds; Disorderly Conduct in a Capitol Building; Parading ... in a Capitol Building	Gunby pleaded Not Guilty to all charges. Jury Trial on 11/13/2023 found him Guilty on all charges. On 8/28/2024, the Court dismisses the Obstruction conviction.	Sentenced on 12/17/2024 to 60 Days of Incarceration; Supervised Release: 12 Months; Special Assessment: $70; Restitution: $500; Fine $1,500.	Gunby received a full pardon on January 20, 2025
January 27, 2021	Brian Gundersen	Federal: Obstruction of an Official Proceeding; Assaulting ... Certain Officers; Entering ... in a Restricted Building or Grounds; Disorderly ... in a Restricted Building or Grounds; Engaging in Physical Violence in a Restricted Building or Grounds: Disorderly Conduct in a Capitol Building; Act of Physical Violence in the Capitol Grounds or Buildings; Parading ... in a Capitol Building	Gundersen pleaded Not Guilty to all charges. Stipulated Bench Trial was held 11/9/2022 where he was found guilty of two charges: Obstruction of an Official Proceeding and Assaulting ... Certain Officers. Defendant agreed to a set of stipulated facts at trial before the Court. The other charges are dismissed.	Sentenced on 7/25/2023 to 18 months incarceration; 36 months supervised release; Special Assessment $200; Restitution of $2,000. On 10/28/2024, the USCA vacated the Obstruction conviction. On 1/21/2025,the court grants the government's motion to dismiss the case with prejudice.	
September 27, 2023	Christopher Gutierrez	Federal: Disorderly Conduct in a Capitol Building; Parading ... in a Capitol Building	Gutierrez pleaded Guilty to both charges.	Sentenced on 8/21/2024 to 3 Years probation; 60 Days of home detention/location monitoring; Special assessment of $20; fine of $1,500; Restitution of $500.	Gutierrez received a full pardon on January 20, 2025
September 13, 2024	Richard Gutowski	Federal: Entering or Remaining in a Restricted Building or Grounds; Disorderly or Disruptive Conduct in a Restricted Building or Grounds; Disorderly Conduct in a Capitol Building; Parading ... in a Capitol Building	Gutowski pleaded Not Guilty to all charges.	On 1/21/2025, the court grants the government's motion to dismiss the case with prejudice.	
May 28, 2021	Joseph Hackett	Federal: Seditious Conspiracy; Conspiracy to Obstruct an Official Proceeding; Obstruction of an Official Proceeding and Aiding and Abetting; Conspiracy to Prevent an Officer from Discharging Any Duties; Destruction of Government Property and Aiding and Abetting	Hackett pleaded Not Guilty to all charges. Jury trial held from 12/6/2022-1/23/2023. He was found Guilty on five charges: Seditious Conspiracy; Conspiracy to Obstruct an Official Proceeding; Obstruction of an Official Proceeding and Aiding and Abetting; Conspiracy to Prevent an Officer from Discharging Any Duties; and Not Guilty of Destruction of Government Property and Aiding and Abetting.	Sentenced on 6/2/2023 to 42 months of incarceration; 36 months of supervised release; special assessment of $400. A proclamation commutes the sentence to time served as of January 20, 2025	
December 01, 2021	James Haffner	Federal: Obstruction of Law Enforcement During a Civil Disorder; Unlawful Entry on Restricted Buildings or Grounds; Violent Entry and Disorderly Conduct on Capitol Grounds; Assaulting ... Certain Officers or Employees			On 1/21/2025, the court grants the government's motion to dismiss the case with prejudice.
May 27, 2021	Stacy Wade Hager	Federal: Entering ... in a Restricted Building; Disorderly ... in a Restricted Building; Violent Entry and Disorderly Conduct in a Capitol Building; Parading ... in a Capitol Building	Hager pleaded Not Guilty to all charges. Bench trial on 4/4/2023 found Hager Guilty on all charges.	Sentenced on 7/13/2023 to 7 months incarceration; $500 restitution; $70 special assessment.	Hager received a full pardon on January 20, 2025
January 17, 2021	Timothy Louis Hale-Cusanelli	Federal: Civil Disorder and Aiding and Abetting; Obstruction of an Official Proceeding and Aiding and Abetting; Entering ... Restricted Building or Grounds; Disorderly ... Restricted Building or Grounds; Impeding Ingress and Egress in a Restricted Building or Grounds; Disorderly Conduct in a Capitol Building; Parading ... in a Capitol Building	Not Guilty – all charges	Found guilty of all charges in a jury trial. Sentenced to 48 months in prison, three years of supervised release, and $2,000 restitution. On 12/19/2024, the USCA vacated the Obstruction conviction. Resentencing set for 3/13/2025. On 1/24/2025, the court grants the government's motion to dismiss the case with prejudice.	
May 26, 2023	Joshua Hall	Federal : Entering ... in a Restricted Building or Grounds	Hall pleaded Guilty to the charge.	Sentenced on 11/17/2023 to 12 months of Probation; $25 Special Assessment; $200 Fine; Restitution of $500; 60 hours of community service.	Hall received a full pardon on January 20, 2025
June 15, 2022	Luis Hallon	Federal: Entering ... in a Restricted Building or Grounds; Disorderly ... in a Restricted Building or Grounds; Disorderly Conduct in a Capitol Building or Grounds; Parading ... in a Capitol Building	Hallon pleaded Guilty to one charge: Parading ... in a Capitol Building. The other charges are dismissed.	Sentenced on 4/26/2023 to 24 months of probation, 60 hours of community service; $500 restitution and $10 special assessment.	Hallon received a full pardon on January 20, 2025
January 24, 2024	Michael Haltom	Federal: Civil Disorder; Assaulting ... Certain Officers; Destruction of Government Property; Entering ... in a Restricted Building or Grounds; Disorderly ... in a Restricted Building or Grounds; Engaging in Physical violence in a Restricted Building or Grounds; Disorderly Conduct in a Capitol Building; Act of Physical Violence in the Capitol Grounds or Buildings; Parading ... in a Capitol Building	Haltom pleaded Not Guilty to all charges.	On 1/21/2025, the court grants the government's motion to dismiss the case with prejudice.	
January 26, 2024	Zylas Hamilton	Federal: Entering ... in a Restricted Building or Grounds; Disorderly ... in a Restricted Building or Grounds; Disorderly Conduct in a Capitol Building; Parading ... in a Capitol Building	Hamilton pleaded Guilty to two charges: Disorderly Conduct in a Capitol Building; Parading ... in a Capitol Building. The other charges are dismissed.	Sentenced on 8/22/2024 to 24 Months of Probation; 30 days location monitoring; $1,000 fine; $500 Restitution; $20 Special Assessment; 60 hours community service.	Hamilton received a full pardon on January 20, 2025
November 09, 2021	Thomas Patrick Hamner	Federal: Assaulting ... Certain Officers Using a Dangerous Weapon and Aiding and Abetting; Civil Disorder and Aiding and Abetting; Entering ... in a Restricted Building or Grounds with a Deadly or Dangerous Weapon; Engaging in Physical Violence in a Restricted Building or Grounds with a Deadly or Dangerous Weapon; Act of Physical Violence in the Capitol Grounds or Buildings	Hamner pleaded Guilty to one charge: Civil Disorder.	Sentenced on 9/23/2022 to 30 months incarceration; three years of supervised release; $2,000 in restitution; $100 special assessment; 200 hours of community service. A stipulated bench trial and sentencing hearing on Count 1 (Assaulting ... Certain Officers Using a Dangerous Weapon) was held on 2/1/2024. Found Guilty and sentenced to 30 months incarceration to be served concurrently to the original sentence, which means the time has already been served; 36 months of Supervised Release; Special Assessment of $100. The other charges are dismissed.	Hamner received a full pardon on January 20, 2025
March 11, 2022	Charles Hand III	Federal: Entering ... in a Restricted Building or Grounds; Disorderly ... in a Restricted Building or Grounds; Disorderly Conduct in a Capitol Building; Parading ... in a Capitol Building	Hand pleaded Guilty to one charge: Parading ... in a Capitol Building. The other charges are dismissed.	Sentenced on 1/13/2023 to 20 days incarceration; 6 months Probation; a $10 Special Assessment; Restitution of $500; 60 hours of community service.	Hand received a full pardon on January 20, 2025
July 18, 2023	Robert Walter Hanna	Federal: Entering ... in a Restricted Building or Grounds; Disorderly ... in a Restricted Building or Grounds; Disorderly Conduct in a Capitol Building or Grounds; Parading ... in a Capitol Building	Hanna pleaded Guilty to two charges: Disorderly Conduct in a Capitol Building or Grounds; Parading ... in a Capitol Building. The other charges are dismissed.	Sentenced on 5/9/2024 to 24 months of Probation; 45 days locations monitoring; $20 Special Assessment; Restitution of $500; Fine of $500.	Hanna received a full pardon on January 20, 2025
July 18, 2023	Steven Louis Jordan Hanna	Federal: Entering ... in a Restricted Building or Grounds; Disorderly ... in a Restricted Building or Grounds; Disorderly Conduct in a Capitol Building or Grounds; Parading ... in a Capitol Building	Hanna pleaded Guilty to two charges: Disorderly Conduct in a Capitol Building or Grounds; Parading ... in a Capitol Building. The other charges are dismissed.	Sentenced on 5/9/2024 to 24 months of Probation; 45 days location monitoring; $20 Special Assessment; Restitution of $500; Fine of $500.	Hanna received a full pardon on January 20, 2025
November 30, 2023	Theo Hanson	Federal: Conspiracy to Impede or Injure Officers; Civil Disorder; Entering ... in a Restricted Building or Grounds; Disorderly ... in a Capitol Building or Grounds; Disorderly Conduct in Capitol Building; Parading ... in a Capitol Building	Hanson pleaded Not Guilty to all charges. Status Conference set for 1/23/2025.	On 1/22/2025, the court grants the government's motion to dismiss the case with prejudice	
April 02, 2021	Michael Lee Hardin	Federal: Entering ... in a Restricted Building; Disorderly ... in a Restricted Building; Violent Entry and Disorderly Conduct in a Capitol Building; Parading ... in a Capitol Building	Hardin pleaded Guilty to one charge: Parading ... in a Capitol Building. The other charges are dismissed.	Sentenced 4/11/2022 to 18 months of Probation; 30 days location monitoring; $10 Special Assessment; Restitution of $500; 60 hours community service.	Hardin received a full pardon on January 20, 2025
January 13, 2021	Peter J. Harding	Federal: Entering ... in a Restricted Building or Grounds; Disorderly ... in a Restricted Building or Grounds; Disorderly Conduct in a Capitol Building; Parading ... in a Capitol Building; Act of Physical Violence in a Capitol Building or Grounds	Harding pleaded Not Guilty to all charges. Jury Trial set for 5/6/2025.	On 1/23/2025, the court ordered that the case is dismissed without prejudice.	
June 15, 2021	Stacie Ann Hargis-Getsinger	Federal: Entering ... in a Restricted Building; Disorderly ... in a Restricted Building; Violent Entry and Disorderly Conduct; Parading ... in a Capitol Building	Hargis-Getsinger pleaded Guilty to one charge: Parading ... in a Capitol Building. The other charges are dismissed.	Sentenced 7/12/2022 to 60 days incarceration; 3 years Probation; Restitution of $500; Special Assessment of $10. Hargis-Getsinger received a full pardon on January 20, 2025	
January 18, 2021	Alex Kirk Harkrider	Federal: Civil Disorder; Obstruction of an Official Proceeding; Theft of Government Property; Entering ... in a Restricted Building or Grounds with a Deadly or Dangerous Weapon; Disorderly ... in a Restricted Building or Grounds with a Deadly or Dangerous Weapon; Disorderly Conduct in a Capitol Building; Parading ... in a Capitol Building	Harkrider pleaded Not Guilty to all charges. Found Guilty on all charges in a Stipulated Bench trial held on 1/2/2024.	Sentenced on 5/23/2024 to 24 months incarceration; 24 months supervised release; $445 special assessment; $2,000 restitution.	Harkrider received a full pardon on January 20, 2025
March 10, 2021	Kenneth Harrelson	Federal: Seditious Conspiracy; Conspiracy to Obstruct an Official Proceeding; Obstruction of an Official Proceeding and Aiding and Abetting; Conspiracy to Prevent an Officer from Discharging Any Duties; Destruction of Government Property and Aiding and Abetting; Tampering with Documents or Proceedings	Harrelson pleaded Not Guilty to all charges.	Jury trial began on 9/27/2022. On 11/29/2022, Harrelson was found Guilty on three charges: Obstruction of an Official Proceeding; Conspiracy to Prevent an Officer from Discharging Any Duties; and Tampering with Documents or Proceedings. Not Guilty on the other three charges. Sentenced on 5/26/2023 to 48 months incarceration; 24 months of supervised release; $300 special assessment.	A proclamation commutes the sentence to time served as of January 20, 2025
February 06, 2024	Daniel Harrington	Federal: Theft of Government Property; Entering ... in a Restricted Building or Grounds; Disorderly ... in a Restricted Building or Grounds; Entering ... in Certain Rooms in the Capitol Building; Disorderly Conduct in a Capitol Building; Parading ... in a Capitol Building	Harrington pleaded Guilty to two charges: Theft of Government Property and Parading ... in a Capitol Building. The other charges are dismissed.	Sentenced on 8/19/2024 to 45 days of Incarceration; 6 months of Probation; Special Assessment fee of $35; Restitution of $500.	Harrington received a full pardon on January 20, 2025
August 08, 2023	Douglas Harrington	Federal: Civil Disorder; Obstruction of an Official Proceeding; Assaulting ... Certain Officers or Employees Using a Dangerous Weapon, Inflicting Bodily Injury; Entering ... in a Restricted Building or Grounds with a Deadly or Dangerous Weapon; Disorderly ... in a Restricted Building or Grounds; Engaging in Physical Violence in a Restricted Building or Grounds; Disorderly Conduct in a Capitol Building; Act of Physical Violence in the Capitol Grounds or Buildings	Harrington pleaded Not guilty to all charges. On 7/10/2024, the court orders Count 2, Obstruction of an Official Proceeding, be dismissed without prejudice. Found Guilty in a Bench trial on 7/31/2024 on seven charges, four of which are lesser versions of the offense.	Sentenced on 11/25/2024 to 40 months incarceration; 24 months of Supervised Release; Special Assessment of $295; Restitution of $2,295.	Harrington received a full pardon on January 20, 2025
January 25, 2023	Austin Brndlen Harris	Federal: Parading ... in a Capitol Building	Harris pleaded Guilty to the charge.	Sentenced on 2/2/2024 to 3 Years of Probation; Special Assessment of $10; Restitution of $500; Fine in the amount of $5,000; 400 hours of community service.	Harris received a full pardon on January 20, 2025
March 18, 2021	Johnny Leroy Harris	Federal: Entering ... in a Restricted Building; Disorderly ... in a Restricted Building; Violent Entry and Disorderly Conduct in a Capitol Building; Parading ... in a Capitol Building	Harris pleaded Guilty to one charge: Disorderly ... in a Restricted Building. The other charges are dismissed.	Sentenced on 6/2/2023 to 7 Months Incarceration; 12 Months Supervised Release; $25 Special Assessment; $500 Restitution.	Harris received a full pardon on January 20, 2025
March 05, 2021	Richard Lee Harris	Federal: Obstruction of an Official Proceeding; Civil Disorder; Assaulting ... Certain Officers; Entering ... in a Restricted Building or Grounds; Disorderly ... in a Restricted Building or Grounds; Engaging in Physical Violence in a Restricted Building or Grounds; Disorderly Conduct in a Capitol Building; Act of Physical Violence in the Capitol Grounds or Buildings; Parading ... in a Capitol Building	Harris pleaded Not Guilty to all charges. On 6/4/2023 he was found Guilty on all charges in a Bench trial.	Sentenced on 10/27/2023 to 41 Months of Incarceration; 36 Months of Supervised Release; Special Assessment of $605.	Harris received a full pardon on January 20, 2025
February 09, 2023	Jeremy Christian Harrison	Federal: Entering ... in a Restricted Building or Grounds; Disorderly ... in a Restricted Building or Grounds; Disorderly Conduct in a Capitol Building or Grounds; Parading ... in a Capitol Building	Harrison pleaded Guilty to one charge: Parading ... in a Capitol Building. The other charges are dismissed.	Sentenced on 11/8/2023 to 24 months of Probation; $10 Special Assessment; Restitution in the amount of $500; 60 hours community service; 30 days home detention.	Harrison received a full pardon on January 20, 2025
July 07, 2023	Eric Glen Harrower	Federal: Entering ... in a Restricted Building or Grounds; Disorderly ... in a Restricted Building or Grounds; Disorderly Conduct in a Capitol Building; Parading ... in a Capitol Building	Harrower pleaded Guilty to one charge: Parading ... in a Capitol Building. The other charges are dismissed.	Sentenced on 4/9/2024 to 12 months Probation; 10 days intermittent confinement; $10 Special Assessment; Restitution in the amount of $500; 50 hours of community service.	Harrower received a full pardon on January 20, 2025
July 31, 2023	Dean Harshman	Federal: Obstruction of an Official Proceeding; Entering ... in a Restricted Building or Grounds; Disorderly ... in a Restricted Building or Grounds; Disorderly Conduct in a Capitol Building; Parading ... in a Capitol Building	Harshman pleaded Guilty to one charge: Disorderly ... in a Restricted Building or Grounds. The other charges are dismissed.	Sentenced on 1/16/2025 to 2 years probation; 90 days home incarceration; $500 restitution; $25 special assessment.	Harshman received a full pardon on January 20, 2025
June 30, 2021	Timothy Allen Hart	Federal: Civil Disorder; Obstruction of an Official Proceeding; Entering ... in a Restricted Building or Grounds; Disorderly ... in a Restricted Building or Grounds; Disorderly Conduct in a Capitol Building; Parading ... in a Capitol Building	Hart pleaded Guilty to one charge: Civil Disorder. The other charges are dismissed.	Sentenced on 7/27/2023 to 36 Months of Probation with 45 days home detention; Special Assessment of $100; Restitution of $2,000; 60 hours of community service.	Hart received a full pardon on January 20, 2025
August 28, 2024	Steven Hassel	Federal: Civil Disorder; Entering ... in a Restricted Building or Grounds; Disorderly ... in a Restricted Building or Grounds; Disorderly Conduct in a Capitol Building; Parading ... in a Capitol Building	Hassel pleaded Not Guilty to all charges.	On 1/23/2025, the court ordered that the case is dismissed without prejudice.	
February 13, 2024	Daniel Hatcher	Federal: Entering ... in a Restricted Building or Grounds; Disorderly ... in a Restricted Building or Grounds; Disorderly Conduct in a Capitol Building; Parading ... in a Capitol Building	Hatcher pleaded Guilty to two charges: Disorderly Conduct in a Capitol Building; Parading ... in a Capitol Building.	On 1/21/2025, the court grants the government's Motion to Dismiss the Indictment with prejudice.	
January 19, 2021	Andrew Hatley	Federal: Entering ... in a Restricted Building; Disorderly ... in a Restricted Building; Violent Entry and Disorderly Conduct in a Capitol Building; Parading ... in a Capitol Building	Hatley pleaded Guilty to one charge: Parading, Demonstrating, and Picketing in a Capitol Building. The other charges were dismissed.	Sentenced 12/16/2021 to 36 months probation; Special Assessment of $10; Restitution of $500.	Hatley received a full pardon on January 20, 2025
November 25, 2024	Jarod Lee Hawks	Federal: Assaulting ... Certain Officers; Assaulting ... Certain Officers Using a Dangerous Weapon; Civil Disorder; Entering ... in a Restricted Building or Grounds with a Deadly or Dangerous Weapon; Disorderly ... in a Restricted Building or Grounds with a Deadly or Dangerous Weapon; Engaging in Physical Violence in a Restricted Building or Grounds with a Deadly or Dangerous Weapon; Disorderly Conduct in a Capitol Building; Act of Physical Violence in the Capitol Grounds or Buildings		On 1/21/2025, the court grants the government's motion to dismiss the case with prejudice.	
August 08, 2023	Jacob Hawkins	Federal: Parading ... in a Capitol Building	Hawkins pleaded Guilty to the charge.	Sentenced on 1/12/2024 to 24 months of probation; Special assessment of $10; Restitution of $500.	Hawkins received a full pardon on January 20, 2025
August 26, 2021	Uliyahu Hayah	Federal: Civil Disorder; Obstruction of an Official Proceeding; Assaulting ... Certain Officers; Entering ... in a Restricted Building or Grounds; Disorderly ... in a Restricted Building or Grounds; Engaging in Physical Violence in a Restricted Building or Grounds; Disorderly Conduct in a Capitol Building; Act of Physical Violence in the Capitol Grounds or Buildings; Parading ... in a Capitol Building	The Obstruction charge was dismissed by the court on 8/18/2022. Hayah pleaded Guilty to one charge: Assaulting ... Certain Officers.	Sentencing set for 1/17/2025. On 1/21/2025, the court grants the government's motion to dismiss the case with prejudice	
July 01, 2021	Joshua Dillon Haynes	Federal: Obstruction of an Official Proceeding; Destruction of Property in the Territorial Jurisdiction; Entering ... in a Restricted Building or Grounds; Disorderly ... in a Restricted Building or Grounds; Engaging in Physical Violence in a Restricted Building or Grounds; Disorderly Conduct in a Capitol Building; Act of Physical Violence in the Capitol Grounds or Buildings; Parading ... in a Capitol Building	Haynes pleaded Guilty to two charges: Obstruction of an Official Proceeding and Destruction of Property in the Territorial Jurisdiction. The other charges are dismissed.	Sentenced on 2/2/2023 to 32 months incarceration; 36 months of supervised release; $2,000 restitution; $200 special assessment. On 4/26/2023, the court ordered Haynes to pay the victim, ZDF, restitution of 29,989.36 euros.	Haynes received a full pardon on January 20, 2025
December 13, 2021	Donald Hazard	Federal: Conspiracy to Obstruct an Official Proceeding; Obstruction of an Official Proceeding and Aiding and Abetting; Civil Disorder; Assaulting, Resisting, Impeding and Inflicting Bodily Injury on Certain Officers; Assaulting ... Certain Officers; Entering ... in a Restricted Building or Grounds; Disorderly ... in a Restricted Building or Grounds; Engaging in Physical Violence in a Restricted Building or Grounds; Disorderly Conduct in a Capitol Building or Grounds; Act of Physical Violence in the Capitol Grounds or Buildings	Hazard pleaded Guilty to one charge: Assaulting, Resisting, Impeding and Inflicting Bodily Injury on Certain Officers. The other charges are dismissed.	Sentenced on 5/19/2023 to 57 months incarceration; 36 months of supervised release; restitution of $2,000; special assessment of $100.	Hazard received a full pardon on January 20, 2025
January 22, 2021	Stephanie M. Hazelton	Federal: Obstruction of an Official Proceeding; Civil Disorder; Aiding and Abetting; Entering ... in a Restricted Building or Grounds; Disorderly ... in a Restricted Building or Grounds; Disorderly Conduct in a Capitol Building; Impeding Passage Through the Capitol Grounds or Buildings	Hazelton pleaded Guilty to one charge: Civil Disorder. The other charges are dismissed.	Sentenced on 6/1/2023 to 10 days incarceration; 90 days location monitoring; 24 months of supervised release; Special Assessment of $100; Restitution of $2,000.	Hazelton received a full pardon on January 20, 2025
April 14, 2021	Albuquerque Cosper Head	Federal: Obstruction of an Official Proceeding; Civil Disorder; Assaulting ... Certain Officers; Entering ... Restricted Building or Grounds; Disorderly ... Restricted Building or Grounds; Impeding Ingress and Egress in a Restricted Building or Grounds; Engaging in Physical Violence in a Restricted Building or Grounds; Impeding Passage Through the Capitol Grounds or Buildings; Act of Physical Violence in the Capitol Grounds or Buildings	Pleaded guilty to assaulting officer Michael Fanone. The other charges are dismissed.	Sentenced to 90 months in prison	Head received a full pardon on January 20, 2025
December 10, 2021	Brian Gerard Healion	Federal: Civil Disorder; Entering ... in a Restricted Building or Grounds; Disorderly ... in a Restricted Building or Grounds; Disorderly Conduct in a Capitol Building; Parading ... in a Capitol Building	Healion pleaded Guilty to one charge: Civil Disorder. The other charges are dismissed.	Sentenced on 7/2/2024 to 100 days of Incarceration; 36 months of Supervised Release; $100 Special Assessment; Restitution of $2,000.	Healion received a full pardon on January 20, 2025
May 04, 2022	Chad Heathcote	Federal: Entering ... in a Restricted Building or Grounds; Disorderly ... in a Restricted Building or Grounds; Disorderly Conduct in a Capitol Building or Grounds; Parading ... in a Capitol Building	Heathcote pleaded Guilty to one charge: Parading ... in a Capitol Building. The other charges are dismissed.	Sentenced on 2/13/2023 to 36 Months of Probation; 15 Days of intermittent confinement to be served on weekends within the first 6 Months of Probation; $500 Restitution; $10 Special Assessment.	Heathcote received a full pardon on January 20, 2025
May 24, 2024	Chad Hedgcock	Federal: Entering ... in a Restricted Building or Grounds; Disorderly ... in a Restricted Building or Grounds; Disorderly Conduct in a Capitol Building or Grounds; Parading ... in a Capitol Building	Hedgcock pleaded Guilty to two charges: Disorderly Conduct in a Capitol Building or Grounds; Parading ... in a Capitol Building.	Sentencing is reset for 3/3/2025. On 1/21/2025, the court grants the government's motion to dismiss the case with prejudice.	
December 20, 2023	Benjamin Heffelfinger	Federal: Entering ... in a Restricted Building or Grounds; Disorderly ... in a Restricted Building or Grounds; Disorderly Conduct in a Capitol Building or Grounds; Parading ... in a Capitol Building	Heffelfinger pleaded Guilty to two charges: Disorderly Conduct in a Capitol Building or Grounds; Parading ... in a Capitol Building. The other charges are dismissed.	Sentenced on 8/5/2024 to 24 months of Probation; 2 months of location monitoring; Special Assessment $20; Restitution $500; 60 hours of community service.	Heffelfinger received a full pardon on January 20, 2025
December 05, 2023	Brandon Heffner	Federal: Civil Disorder; Entering ... in a Restricted Building or Grounds; Disorderly ... in a Restricted Building or Grounds; Disorderly Conduct in a Capitol Building; Impeding Passage through the Capitol Grounds or Buildings	Heffner pleaded Guilty to one charge: Civil Disorder.	Sentencing set for 3/21/2025. On 1/22/2025, the court grants the government's motion to dismiss the case with prejudice	
March 18, 2021	Jennifer Marie Heinl	Federal: Entering ... in a Restricted Building; Disorderly ... in a Restricted Building; Violent Entry and Disorderly Conduct in a Capitol Building; Parading ... in a Capitol Building	Heinl pleaded Guilty to one charge: Parading ... in a Capitol Building. The other charges are dismissed.	Sentenced 6/8/2022 to 2 years probation; 14 days of intermittent incarceration; 50 hours of community service; $500 restitution; $10 special assessment.	Heinl received a full pardon on January 20, 2025
January 18, 2023	Dodge Dale Hellonen	Federal: Parading ... in a Capitol Building	Hellonen pleaded Guilty to the charge.	Sentenced on 9/11/2023 to 4 years probation; 279 hours of community service; $10 special assessment; $500 restitution.	Hellonen received a full pardon on January 20, 2025
January 15, 2021	Edward E. Hemenway	Federal: Entering ... in a Restricted Building; Disorderly ... in a Restricted Building; Violent Entry and Disorderly Conduct at the Grounds and in a Capitol Building; Parading, Demonstrating, and Picketing in a Capitol Building	Hemenway pleaded Guilty to one charge: Parading, Demonstrating, and Picketing in a Capitol Building. The other charges were dismissed.	Sentenced 10/13/2021 to 45 days of incarceration; 60 hours of community service; $10 assessment fee; restitution in the amount of $500.	According to reporting, Hemenway breached the U.S. Capitol building while chanting "Stop the Steal!" and "Our house!" At one point, prosecutors said, he took a selfie inside the Capitol with his middle finger raised to the camera, and posed for another photo while standing on a government vehicle that had been overrun by the rioters. In 2006, Hemenway pleaded guilty to "Sexual Battery and Criminal Confinement" and was initially sentenced to three years in prison. "His probation was revoked, however, and he was re-sentenced to 5 years imprisonment," Jan. 6 prosecutors said. Hemenway received a full pardon on January 20, 2025
August 03, 2021	Pamela Anne Hemphill	Federal: Entering ... in a Restricted Building; Disorderly ... in a Restricted Building; Violent Entry and Disorderly Conduct in a Capitol Building; Parading ... in a Capitol Building	Hemphill pleaded Guilty to one charge: Parading, Demonstrating, or Picketing in a Capitol Building.	The other charges are dismissed. On 5/24/2022, Hemphill was sentenced to 60 days of incarceration followed by 3 years of probation; special assessment of $10; restitution of $500.	Hemphill received a full pardon on January 20, 2025, which she rejected. Hemphill subsequently appeared before a panel of House Democrats to apologize for her actions that day.
May 27, 2021	Nicholas Patrick Hendrix	Federal: Entering ... in a Restricted Building or Grounds; Disorderly ... in a Restricted Building or Grounds; Disorderly Conduct in a Capitol Building; Parading ... in a Capitol Building	Hendrix pleaded Guilty to one charge: Parading ... in a Capitol Building. The other charges are dismissed.	Sentenced on 12/9/2022 to 30 days incarceration followed by a term of 3 years of Probation; a Special Assessment of $10; restitution of $500. Re-sentenced on 4/24/2024 to 42 Months of Probation with 18 Months credit for time served; Special Assessment of $10.	Hendrix received a full pardon on January 20, 2025
February 23, 2022	Jon Nicholas Heneghan	Federal: Entering ... in a Restricted Building or Grounds; Disorderly ... in a Restricted Building or Grounds; Disorderly Conduct in a Capitol Building or Grounds; Parading ... in a Capitol Building	Heneghan pleaded Guilty to one charge: Entering ... in a Restricted Building or Grounds. The other charges are dismissed.	Sentenced on 6/23/2023 to 20 Days of incarceration; 1 Year of Supervised Release; Special Assessment of $25; Restitution of $500.	Heneghan received a full pardon on January 20, 2025
May 01, 2024	Michael Hennessey	Federal: Civil Disorder; Entering ... in a Restricted Building or Grounds; Disorderly or Disruptive Conduct in a Restricted Building or Grounds; Disorderly or Disruptive Conduct in a Capitol Building or Grounds; Parading ... in a Capitol Building	Hennessey pleaded Not Guilty to all charges.	On 1/22/2025, the court grants the government's motion to dismiss the case with prejudice	
May 30, 2024	Tyler Henson	Federal: Entering or Remaining in a Restricted Building or Grounds; Disorderly or Disruptive Conduct in a Restricted Building or Grounds; Disorderly Conduct in a Capitol Building; Parading ... in a Capitol Building	Henson pleaded Guilty to two charges: Disorderly Conduct in a Capitol Building; Parading ... in a Capitol Building. The other charges are dismissed.	Sentenced on 1/17/2025 to 6 months of probation; $20 Special Assessment; $500 Restitution; $500 Fine.	Henson received a full pardon on January 20, 2025
October 04, 2021	Cara Maureen Hentschel	Federal: Entering ... in a Restricted Building or Grounds; Disorderly ... in a Restricted Building or Grounds; Disorderly Conduct in a Capitol Building; Parading ... in a Capitol Building	Hentschel pleaded Guilty to one charge: Parading ... in a Capitol Building. The other charges are dismissed.	Sentenced on 9/30/2022 to 45 days in a halfway house/residential reentry; 36 Months of Probation; Special Assessment of $10; Fine of $500; Restitution of $500; 60 hours of community service.	Hentschel received a full pardon on January 20, 2025
March 18, 2021	Daniel Herendeen	Federal: Obstruction of an Official Proceeding; Entering ... in a Restricted Building or Grounds; Disorderly ... in a Restricted Building or Grounds; Disorderly Conduct in a Capitol Building; Parading ... in a Capitol Building	Herendeen pleaded Guilty to one charge: Entering ... in a Restricted Building or Grounds. The other charges are dismissed.	Sentenced 4/1/2022 to 36 months of Probation with 14 days of intermittent confinement and 2 months home detention/location monitoring; a special assessment of $25 and restitution in the amount of $500.	Herendeen received a full pardon on January 20, 2025
February 25, 2021	Andrew Alan Hernandez	Federal: Obstruction of an Official Proceeding; Entering ... in a Restricted Building or Grounds; Disorderly ... in a Restricted Building or Grounds; Entering ... in the Gallery of Congress; Disorderly Conduct in a Capitol Building; Parading ... in a Capitol Building	Hernandez pleaded Guilty to one charge: Obstruction of an Official Proceeding. The other charges are dismissed.	Sentenced on 1/30/2023 to 18 Months incarceration; 36 Months Supervised Release; Special Assessment of $100; restitution of $2,000.	Hernandez received a full pardon on January 20, 2025
January 19, 2021	Emily Hernandez	Federal: Entering ... in a Restricted Building or Grounds	Hernandez pleaded Guilty to the charge.	Sentenced 4/11/2022 to 30 days incarceration, one year of supervised release, 80 hours of community service, $500 restitution, $25 special assessment.	Hernandez received a full pardon on January 20, 2025. In January 2025 she was sentenced to ten years in prison for an unrelated drunk-driving conviction that killed a mother of two.
February 23, 2022	Joshua Lee Hernandez	Federal: Civil Disorder; Obstruction of an Official Proceeding and Aiding and Abetting; Assaulting ... Certain Officers; Entering ... in a Restricted Building or Grounds; Disorderly ... in a Restricted Building or Grounds; Engaging in Physical Violence in a Restricted Building or Grounds; Entering ... in the Gallery of Congress; Disorderly Conduct in a Capitol Building; Parading ... in a Capitol Building	Hernandez pleaded Guilty to two charges: Civil Disorder and Assaulting ... Certain Officers. The other charges are dismissed.	Sentenced on 2/2/2023 to two years incarceration; 36 months supervised release; special assessment of $200; restitution of $2,000.	Hernandez received a full pardon on January 20, 2025
August 19, 2021	Erik Herrera	Federal: Obstruction of an Official Proceeding; Entering ... in a Restricted Building or Grounds; Disorderly ... in a Restricted Building or Grounds; Disorderly Conduct in a Capitol Building; Parading ... in a Capitol Building	Herrera pleaded Not Guilty to all charges. A jury trial held 8/15/2022-8/19/2022 found him Guilty on all charges.	Sentenced on 1/13/2023 to 4 years incarceration; three years of supervised release, $2,000 restitution, a fine of $1,000, and a special assessment of $170. On 11/20/2024, the USCA orders the Obstruction conviction be vacated and a resentencing be held. On 1/22/2025, the court vacated the resentencing hearing.	Herrera received a full pardon on January 20, 2025
June 08, 2021	Dillon Colby Herrington	Federal: Assaulting ... Certain Officers	Herrington pleaded Guilty to the charge.	Sentenced on 12/1/2023 to 37 Months Incarceration; 3 Years Of Supervised Release; Restitution Of $2,000; Special Assessment Of $100.	Herrington received a full pardon on January 20, 2025. In 2024, Herrington was indicted on rape charges.
October 16, 2024	Michael Hershberger-Davis	Federal: Entering ... in a Restricted Building or Grounds; Disorderly ... in a Restricted Building or Grounds; Disorderly Conduct in a Capitol Building; Parading ... in a Capitol Building	Hershberger-Davis pleaded Not Guilty to all charges.	On 1/27/2025, the court grants the government's motion to dismiss the case with prejudice	
March 02, 2023	Cameron Edward Hess	Federal: Civil Disorder; Assaulting ... Certain Officers; Entering ... in a Restricted Building or Grounds; Disorderly ... in a Restricted Building or Grounds; Engaging in Physical Violence in a Restricted Building or Grounds; Disorderly Conduct in a Capitol Building; Act of Physical Violence in the Capitol Grounds or Buildings; Parading ... in a Capitol Building	Hess pleaded Guilty to one charge: Civil Disorder. The other charges are dismissed.	Sentenced on 2/26/2024 to 9 months incarceration; 36 months of supervised release; Restitution in the amount of $2,000; Special Assessment of $100.	Hess received a full pardon on January 20, 2025
August 28, 2023	Joseph Kerry Hicks	Federal: Civil Disorder; Entering ... in a Restricted Building or Grounds; Disorderly ... in a Restricted Building or Grounds; Disorderly Conduct in a Capitol Building; Parading ... in a Capitol Building	Hicks pleaded Not Guilty to all charges. Found Guilty on two charges in a Bench trial verdict on 6/27/2024: Disorderly Conduct in a Capitol Building; Parading ... in a Capitol Building. Found Not Guilty on the other three charges.	Sentenced on 10/1/2024 to 24 months of Probation; Special Assessment of $20; 100 hours of community service.	Hicks received a full pardon on January 20, 2025
February 07, 2023	Dusty Allan Higgins	Federal: Entering or Remaining in a Restricted Building; Disorderly ... in a Restricted Building; Disorderly Conduct in a Capitol Building; Parading ... in Capitol Building	Higgins pleaded Guilty to one charge: Parading ... in Capitol Building. The other charges are dismissed.	Sentenced on 3/8/2024 to 36 Months Probation; 14 days intermittent confinement; $500 Restitution; $10 Special Assessment; 50 hours of community service.	Higgins received a full pardon on January 20, 2025
March 05, 2024	Clayton Hildebrand	Federal: Obstruction of an Official Proceeding; Entering ... in a Restricted Building or Grounds; Disorderly ... in a Restricted Building or Grounds; Disorderly Conduct in a Capitol Building; Parading ... in a Capitol Building	Hildebrand pleaded Guilty to one charge: Parading ... in a Capitol Building. Jury Trial set for 4/15/2025 on remaining counts.	On 1/21/2025, the court grants the government's motion to dismiss the case with prejudice	
January 19, 2021	Jacob Gavin Hiles	Federal: Knowingly Entering ... Restricted Building or Grounds Without Lawful Authority; Knowingly, With Intent to Impede Government Business or Official Functions, Engaging in Disorderly Conduct on Capitol Grounds; Parading ... in the Capitol Buildings	Guilty – one charge: Parading ... in the Capitol Buildings. The other charges were dismissed.	Sentenced on December 6, 2021, to 24 months of probation, 60 hours of community service, and $500 restitution.	Hiles received a full pardon on January 20, 2025
February 16, 2024	Charles Tyler Himber	Federal: Civil Disorder; Entering ... in a Restricted Building or Grounds; Disorderly ... in a Restricted Building or Grounds; Disorderly Conduct in a Capitol Building; Parading ... in a Capitol Building	Himber pleaded Guilty to one charge: Civil Disorder.	Sentenced on 12/12/2024 to 36 months Probation; 4 months of intermittent confinement during the first year (consistent with deft's work schedule); 100 hours of community service during the remaining two years; $100 Special Assessment; Restitution of $2,000.	Himber received a full pardon on January 20, 2025
February 01, 2024	Sandra Lee Hodges	Federal: Entering ... in a Restricted Building or Grounds; Disorderly ... in a Restricted Building or Grounds; Disorderly Conduct in a Capitol Building; Parading ... in a Capitol Building	Hodges pleaded Guilty to two charges: Disorderly Conduct in a Capitol Building; Parading ... in a Capitol Building.	Sentenced on 11/1/2024 to 10 days incarceration; Special Assessment of $20; 36 Months of Probation.	Hodges received a full pardon on January 20, 2025
February 16, 2021	Paul Allard Hodgkins	Federal: Obstructing or Impeding Any Official Proceeding and Aiding and Abetting; Knowingly Entering ... Restricted Building or Grounds Without Lawful Authority and Impeding or Disrupting Official Functions; Violent Entry and Disorderly Conduct in Capitol Buildings	Guilty – Obstruction of an Official Proceeding; The other charges were dismissed.	8 months in prison and 24 months of supervised release; $100 special assessment; and $2,000 restitution. Date: July 19, 2021	The judge said: "That was not, by any stretch of the imagination, a protest.... It was ... an assault on democracy;" and: "If we allow people to storm the United States Capitol, what are we doing to preserve our democracy?" This sentence was less than the 15-month sentence recommended by the prosecution. Hodgkins received a full pardon on January 20, 2025.
August 20, 2024	Thomas Hodo	Federal: Civil Disorder; Entering ... in a Restricted Building or Grounds; Disorderly ... in a Restricted Building or Grounds; Disorderly Conduct in a Capitol Building or Grounds	Hodo pleaded Not Guilty to all charges.	On 2/24/2025, the court grants the government's motion to dismiss the case with prejudice.	
December 13, 2024	Judith C. Hoekstra	Federal: Entering or Remaining in a Restricted Building or Grounds; Knowingly, and with intent to impede or disrupt the orderly conduct of Government business or official functions; Enter or remain in the gallery of either House of Congress; Disorderly Conduct in a Capitol Building; Parading ... in a Capitol Building; Obstruction of Law Enforcement During Civil Disorder		On 1/21/2025, the court grants the government's motion to dismiss the case with prejudice.	
August 28, 2024	Nicholas Scott Ingram Hofer	Federal: Assaulting ... Certain Officers; Civil Disorder; Entering ... in a Restricted Building or Grounds; Disorderly ... in a Restricted Building or Grounds; Engaging in Physical Violence in a Restricted Building or Grounds; Disorderly Conduct in a Capitol Building; Act of Physical Violence in the Capitol Grounds or Buildings		On 1/21/2025, the court grants the government's motion to dismiss the case with prejudice.	
July 12, 2023	Luke Hoffman	Federal: Civil Disorder (2 counts); Assaulting ... Certain Officers; Assaulting ... Certain Officers Using a Dangerous Weapon; Entering ... in a Restricted Building or Grounds with a Deadly or Dangerous Weapon; Disorderly ... in a Restricted Building or Grounds; Engaging in Physical Violence in a Restricted Building or Grounds; Disorderly Conduct in a Capitol Building; Impeding Passage Through the Capitol Grounds or Buildings	Hoffman pleaded Guilty to two charges of Assault, count 3 and a lesser charge of count 4: Assaulting ... Certain Officers. The other charges are dismissed.	Sentenced on 9/13/2024 to 20 months incarceration; 36 months supervised release; $2,000 restitution; $200 special assessment.	Hoffman received a full pardon on January 20, 2025
September 11, 2024	Ryan Holden	Federal: Entering or Remaining in a Restricted Building or Grounds; Disorderly or Disruptive Conduct in a Restricted Building or Grounds; Disorderly Conduct in a Capitol Building; Parading ... in a Capitol Building		On 1/22/2025, the court grants the government's motion to dismiss the case with prejudice.	
December 02, 2021	Brent John Holdridge	Federal: Entering ... in a Restricted Building or Grounds; Disorderly ... in a Restricted Building or Grounds; Disorderly Conduct in a Capitol Building; Parading ... in a Capitol Building	Holdridge pleaded Guilty to one charge: Parading ... in a Capitol Building. The other charges are dismissed.	Sentenced on 1/9/2023 to 60 Days Incarceration; 3 Years Probation; Restitution Of $500; Special Assessment Of $10. Resentencing held 6/28/2024. The Court vacates the period of probation as illegally imposed. Order forthcoming. Holdridge sentenced to time served. Restitution Of $500; Special Assessment of $10.	Holdridge received a full pardon on January 20, 2025. On May 11, 2025, Holdridge was charged with theft of industrial copper wire.
September 13, 2024	Brian Holmes	Federal: Civil Disorder; Assaulting ... Certain Officers; Entering ... in a Restricted Building or Grounds; Disorderly ... in a Restricted Building or Grounds; Engaging in Physical Violence in a Restricted Building or Grounds; Act of Physical Violence in the Capitol Grounds or Buildings	Holmes pleaded Not Guilty to all charges.	On 1/23/2025, the court grants the government's motion to dismiss the case with prejudice	
February 20, 2024	Sarah Kathleen Holmes	Federal: Disorderly Conduct in a Capitol Building or Grounds; Parading ... in a Capitol Building	Holmes pleaded Guilty to the two charges.	Sentenced on 5/10/2024 to 12 Months of Probation; 60 hours of community service; special assessment of $20; Fine of $1,000; Restitution of $500.	Holmes received a full pardon on January 20, 2025
November 26, 2021	Lisa Anne Homer	Federal: Parading ... in a Capitol Building	Homer pleaded Guilty to the single charge.	Sentenced 8/9/2022 to 36 Months Probation; $10 Special Assessment; $5,000 Fine; Restitution of $500; 60 hours of community service.	Homer received a full pardon on January 20, 2025
March 16, 2021	Dillon Paul Homol	Federal: Obstruction of an Official Proceeding and Aiding and Abetting; Entering ... in a Restricted Building or Grounds; Disorderly ... in a Restricted Building or Grounds; Disorderly Conduct in a Capitol Building; Parading ... in a Capitol Building	Homol pleaded Not Guilty to all charges. In a Bench trial on 9/29/2023, found Guilty on 3 charges. Found Not Guilty of one charge: Obstruction of an Official Proceeding. Pleaded Guilty to one charge: Parading ... in a Capitol Building.	Sentenced on 1/18/2024 to 24 months of probation; 90 days location monitoring; 40 hours of community service; $70 special assessment; $500 restitution; $4,000 fine.	Homol received a full pardon on January 20, 2025
January 10, 2024	David Kennedy Homol	Federal: Obstruction of Justice/Congress; Assaulting ... Certain Officers; Obstruction of Law Enforcement during Civil Disorder; Knowingly Entering or Remaining in any Restricted Building or Grounds without Lawful Authority; Disorderly ... in a Restricted Building or Grounds; Engaging in Physical Violence in a Restricted Building or Grounds; Disorderly Conduct in a Capitol Building; Act of Physical Violence on Capitol Grounds		As confirmed by the government and defense counsel, Homol died on 4/18/2024. Motion for abatement of prosecution is granted. Complaint is dismissed.	
February 11, 2021	Adam Avery Honeycutt	Federal: Parading ... in a Capitol Building	Honeycutt pleaded Guilty to the single charge.	Sentenced on 5/11/2022 to 90 days of Incarceration to run consecutively with term currently serving in Florida case; Restitution of $500 and Special Assessment of $10.	Honeycutt received a full pardon on January 20, 2025
November 21, 2023	Matthew Honigford	Federal: Assaulting ... Certain Officers	Honigford pleaded Guilty to the charge.	Sentenced on 8/19/2024 to 19 Months Incarceration; 24 Months of Supervised Release; Restitution of $2,000; Special Assessment fee of $100.	Honigford received a full pardon on January 20, 2025
August 05, 2022	Kasey Von Owen Hopkins	Federal: Entering ... in a Restricted Building or Grounds; Disorderly ... in a Restricted Building or Grounds; Disorderly Conduct in a Capitol Building; Parading ... in a Capitol Building	Hopkins pleaded Guilty to one charge: Parading ... in a Capitol Building. The other charges are dismissed.	Sentenced on 4/10/2023 to 4 months of incarceration; Probation for 2 years; $10 special assessment; restitution of $500.	Hopkins was convicted in 2002 of "forcible rape," which resulted in a seven-year prison sentence, according to prosecutors' sentencing memorandum for his Jan. 6 case, who alleged: "The defendant had forcible intercourse with the victim, choked her to the point of impairing her vision, banged her head into a wall, and urinated into the victim's mouth to humiliate her. When the victim attempted to flee, naked, the defendant caught up to her and threw her down." Hopkins also had other prior convictions for "assault on a law enforcement officer," "operating a motor vehicle without a license," and "possession of a controlled substance." Hopkins wrote a letter to the judge who oversaw his Jan. 6 case which expressed shame and regret for his actions on Jan. 6. Hopkins received a full pardon on January 20, 2025
August 08, 2023	Corey Horan	Federal: Entering ... in a Restricted Building or Grounds; Disorderly ... in a Restricted Building or Grounds; Disorderly Conduct in a Capitol Building; Parading ... in a Capitol Building	Horan pleaded Guilty to one charge: Entering ... in a Restricted Building or Grounds. The other charges are dismissed.	Sentenced on 8/22/2024 to 36 Months Probation; 60 days home detention; $25 Special Assessment; $500 Restitution; 60 hours community service.	Horan received a full pardon on January 20, 2025
April 09, 2021	Stephen Ethan Horn	Federal: Entering ... in a Restricted Building; Disorderly ... in a Restricted Building; Violent Entry and Disorderly Conduct in a Capitol Building; Parading ... in a Capitol Building	Horn pleaded Not Guilty to all charges. Found Guilty in a jury trial on 9/18/2023 on all counts.	Sentenced on 1/10/2024 to 12 months probation; $70 special assessment; $2,000 fine; 90 hours of community service.	Horn received a full pardon on January 20, 2025
February 26, 2021	James Matthew Horning	Federal: Obstruction of an Official Proceeding and Aiding and Abetting; Entering ... in a Restricted Building or Grounds; Disorderly ... in a Restricted Building or Grounds; Disorderly Conduct in a Capitol Building; Parading ... in a Capitol Building	Horning pleaded Guilty to one charge: Entering ... in a Restricted Building or Grounds. The other charges are dismissed.	Sentenced on 2/15/2023 to 30 days incarceration, followed by twelve 12 months of supervised release; Special Assessment of $25; restitution of $500; 60 hours of community service.	Horning received a full pardon on January 20, 2025
May 03, 2022	Jennifer Horvath	Federal: Entering ... in a Restricted Building or Grounds; Disorderly ... in a Restricted Building or Grounds; Disorderly Conduct in a Capitol Building or Grounds; Parading ... in a Capitol Building	Horvath pleaded Guilty to one charge: Parading ... in a Capitol Building. The other charges are dismissed.	Sentenced 11/4/2022 to 36 months Probation with special conditions of confinement for 14 days at a residential reentry center and 90 days home detention; special assessment of $10; restitution of $500.	Horvath received a full pardon on January 20, 2025
August 17, 2022	Ian Ross Horvath	Federal: Entering ... in a Restricted Building or Grounds; Disorderly ... in a Restricted Building or Grounds; Disorderly Conduct in a Capitol Building; Parading ... in a Capitol Building	Horvath pleaded Guilty to one charge: Parading ... in a Capitol Building. The other charges are dismissed.	Sentenced on 5/12/2023 to 3 years of probation; $500 in restitution; $10 special assessment.	Horvath received a full pardon on January 20, 2025
June 10, 2021	Alan Hostetter	Federal: Conspiracy to Obstruct an Official Proceeding; Obstruction of an Official Proceeding and Aiding and Abetting; Entering ... in a Restricted Building and Grounds with a Deadly or Dangerous Weapon; Disorderly ... in a Restricted Building or Grounds with a Deadly or Dangerous Weapon	Hostetter pleaded Not Guilty to all charges. Found Guilty on all charges in a Bench trial on 7/13/2023.	Sentenced on 12/7/2023 to 135 months incarceration; 36 months supervised release; restitution of $2,000; a fine of $30,000; a special assessment of $400.	Hostetter received a full pardon on January 20, 2025
January 18, 2024	David Brian Howard	Federal: Entering ... in a Restricted Building or Grounds; Disorderly ... in a Restricted Building or Grounds; Disorderly Conduct in a Capitol Building or Grounds; Parading ... in a Capitol Building	Howard pleaded Guilty to two charges: Disorderly Conduct in a Capitol Building or Grounds; Parading ... in a Capitol Building. The other charges are dismissed.	Sentenced on 8/21/2024 to 24 months of probation; $20 restitution; $500 restitution; 60 hours of community service.	Howard received a full pardon on January 20, 2025
October 28, 2022	Joseph Howe	Federal: Obstruction of an Official Proceeding; Civil Disorder; Assaulting ... Certain Officers (2 counts); Destruction of Government Property; Entering ... in a Restricted Building or Grounds with a Deadly or Dangerous Weapon; Disorderly ... in a Restricted Building or Grounds with a Deadly or Dangerous Weapon; Engaging in Physical Violence in a Restricted Building or Grounds with a Deadly or Dangerous Weapon; Disorderly Conduct in a Capitol Building; Act of Physical Violence in the Capitol Grounds or Buildings; Parading ... in any of the Capitol Buildings	Howe pleaded Guilty to two charges: Obstruction of an Official Proceeding and Assaulting ... Certain Officers. The other charges are dismissed.	Sentenced on 10/20/2023 to 50 months of Incarceration; 12 months of Supervised Release; Special Assessment of $100; Restitution in the amount of $2,000.	Howe received a full pardon on January 20, 2025
March 08, 2021	Annie Howell	Federal: Obstruction of an Official Proceeding; Aiding and Abetting; Entering ... in a Restricted Building or Grounds; Disorderly ... in a Restricted Building or Grounds; Disorderly Conduct in a Capitol Building; Parading ... in a Capitol Building	Howell pleaded Guilty to one charge: Entering ... in a Restricted Building or Grounds. The other charges are dismissed.	Sentenced 3/2/22 to 36 months of probation, including 60 days of intermittent incarceration; 60 hours of community service, $500 in restitution; $25 assessment fee.	Howell received a full pardon on January 20, 2025
January 24, 2024	Jason James Howland	Federal: Civil Disorder; Obstruction of an Official Proceeding; Entering ... in a Restricted Building or Grounds; Disorderly ... in a Restricted Building or Grounds; Disorderly Conduct in a Capitol Building; Parading ... in a Capitol Building	Howland pleaded Guilty to one charge: Civil Disorder. The other charges are dismissed.	Sentenced on 1/10/2025 to 36 Months of Probation; home detention for 3 Months; Special Assessment of $100; Restitution of $2,000; Fine of $8,000.	Howland received a full pardon on January 20, 2025
December 08, 2021	Jeffrey William Hubbard	Federal: Entering ... in a Restricted Building or Grounds; Disorderly ... in a Restricted Building or Grounds; Disorderly Conduct in a Capitol Building; Parading ... in a Capitol Building	Hubbard pleaded Guilty to one charge: Parading ... in a Capitol Building. The other charges are dismissed.	Sentenced on 2/17/2023 to 45 days incarceration; 36 Months of Probation (with conditions); $500 Restitution; $500 Fine; $10 Special Assessment.	Hubbard received a full pardon on January 20, 2025
August 26, 2024	Hal Ray Huddleston	Federal: Civil Disorder; Entering ... in a Restricted Building or Grounds; Disorderly ... in a Restricted Building or Grounds; Disorderly Conduct in a Capitol Building; Parading ... in a Capitol Building	Huddleston was indicted by Grand Jury on 1/8/2025.	On 1/22/2025, the court ordered that the case is dismissed without prejudice.	
May 25, 2022	Josiah Pablo Hueso	Federal: Entering ... in a Restricted Building or Grounds; Disorderly ... in a Restricted Building or Grounds; Disorderly Conduct in a Capitol Building; Parading ... in a Capitol Building	Hueso pleaded Guilty to one charge: Parading ... in a Capitol Building. The other charges are dismissed.	Sentenced on 8/8/2023 to 36 months probation; restitution of $500; special assessment of $10; 50 hours of community service.	Hueso received a full pardon on January 20, 2025
February 01, 2021	Jerod Wade Hughes	Federal: Civil Disorder; Obstruction of an Official Proceeding; Destruction of Government Property; Entering ... in a Restricted Building or Grounds; Disorderly ... in a Restricted Building or Grounds; Entering ... on the Floor of Congress; Entering ... in Certain Rooms in the Capitol Building; Disorderly Conduct in a Capitol Building; Parading ... in a Capitol Building	Hughes pleaded Guilty to one charge: Obstruction of an Official Proceeding. The other charges are dismissed.	Sentenced on 1/6/2023 to 46 months of Incarceration; 36 months of Supervised Release; $100 Special Assessment; Restitution of $2,000.	Hughes received a full pardon on January 20, 2025
February 01, 2021	Joshua Calvin Hughes	Federal: Civil Disorder; Obstruction of an Official Proceeding; Destruction of Government Property; Entering ... in a Restricted Building or Grounds; Disorderly ... in a Restricted Building or Grounds; Entering ... on the Floor of Congress; Entering ... in Certain Rooms in the Capitol Building; Disorderly Conduct in a Capitol Building; Parading ... in a Capitol Building	Hughes pleaded Guilty to one charge: Obstruction of an Official Proceeding. The other charges are dismissed.	Sentenced 11/22/2022 to 38 months of incarceration, 36 months of supervised release, $2,000 restitution and $100 special assessment.	Hughes received a full pardon on January 20, 2025
August 30, 2023	Nathan Earl Hughes	Federal: Civil Disorder; Assaulting ... Certain Officers; Entering ... in a Restricted Building or Grounds; Disorderly ... in a Restricted Building or Grounds; Impeding Passage through the Capitol Grounds or Buildings	Hughes pleaded Guilty to three charges: Civil Disorder; Assaulting ... Certain Officers; Impeding Passage through the Capitol Grounds or Buildings. The other charges are dismissed.	Sentenced on 12/16/2024 to 25 Months of Incarceration; 36 Months of Supervised Release; Special Assessment of $210; Fine of $5,000.	Hughes received a full pardon on January 20, 2025
January 16, 2024	Jonathan Andrew Humphreys	Federal: Entering ... in a Restricted Building or Grounds; Disorderly ... in a Restricted Building or Grounds; Disorderly Conduct in a Capitol Building or Grounds; Parading ... in a Capitol Building	Humphreys pleaded Guilty to two charges: Disorderly Conduct in a Capitol Building or Grounds; Parading ... in a Capitol Building.	Sentencing set for 2/5/2025. On 1/21/2025, the court grants the government's motion to dismiss the case with prejudice.	
March 05, 2024	Evan Hunt	Federal: Obstruction of an Official Proceeding; Entering ... in a Restricted Building or Grounds; Disorderly ... in a Restricted Building or Grounds; Disorderly Conduct in a Capitol Building; Parading ... in a Capitol Building	Hunt pleaded Not Guilty to all charges.	On 1/21/2025, the court grants the government's motion to dismiss the case with prejudice	
June 30, 2021	Joseph Daniel Hutchinson III	Federal: Civil Disorder; Assaulting ... Certain Officers (3 counts); Entering ... in a Restricted Building or Grounds; Disorderly ... in a Restricted Building or Grounds; Engaging in Physical Violence in a Restricted Building or Grounds; Act of Physical Violence in the Capitol Grounds or Buildings; Failure to Appear	Hutchinson pleaded Not Guilty to all charges. Failed to appear for hearings and declared a fugitive on 4/6/2023. Found and arrested on 1/6/2024 in Groveland, Fla. Jury Trial reset for 2/18/2025.	On 1/23/2025, the court grants the government's motion to dismiss the case with prejudice.	
November 09, 2022	Dale Huttle	Federal: Assaulting ... Certain Officers Using a Deadly or Dangerous Weapon (2 counts); Assaulting ... Certain Officers; Civil Disorder; Entering ... in a Restricted Building or Grounds with a Deadly or Dangerous Weapon; Disorderly ... in a Restricted Building or Grounds with a Deadly or Dangerous Weapon; Engaging in Physical Violence in a Restricted Building or Grounds with a Deadly or Dangerous Weapon; Disorderly or Disruptive Conduct in the Capitol Grounds or Buildings; Act of Physical Violence in the Capitol Grounds or Buildings	Huttle pleaded Guilty to one charge: Assaulting ... Certain Officers Using a Deadly or Dangerous Weapon.	The other charges are dismissed. Sentenced on 6/18/2024 to 30 months incarceration; 36 months of supervised release; $3,639 in restitution; $100 special assessment.	Dale Huttle was the uncle of Matthew Huttle, another individual charged in connection with the January 6 riots. Huttle received a full pardon on January 20, 2025
November 28, 2022	Matthew Huttle	Federal: Entering ... in a Restricted Building or Grounds; Disorderly ... in a Restricted Building or Grounds; Disorderly or Disruptive Conduct in the Capitol Grounds or Buildings; Parading ... in a Capitol Building	Huttle pleaded Guilty to one charge: Entering ... in a Restricted Building or Grounds.	Sentenced on 11/28/2023 to 6 months incarceration; 12 months of supervised release; $25 special assessment; $500 in restitution.	After being granted clemency by President Trump on January 20, 2025, Huttle was shot and killed on January 26, 2025, while in possession of a firearm and resisting arrest during a traffic stop. Huttle had a prior criminal record which included a sentence of 2.5 years in prison for beating and injuring his 3-year-old son. Matthew Huttle was the nephew of Dale Huttle, another individual charged in connection with the January 6 riots.
February 02, 2021	Jason Lee Hyland	Federal: Entering ... in a Restricted Building; Disorderly ... in a Restricted Building; Violent Entry and Disorderly Conduct in a Capitol Building; Parading ... in a Capitol Building	Hyland pleaded Guilty to one charge: Parading ... in a Capitol Building. The other charges are dismissed.	Sentenced on 8/9/2022 to 7 days incarceration; $10 special assessment; $500 in restitution; $4,000 fine.	Hyland received a full pardon on January 20, 2025
January 19, 2021	Suzanne Ianni	Federal: Entering or Remaining in Restricted Building or Grounds; Disorderly ... in a Restricted Building or Grounds; Disorderly Conduct in a Capitol Building	Ianni pleaded Guilty to one charge: Disorderly Conduct in a Capitol Building. The other charges are dismissed.	Sentenced 12/2/2022 to 15 days of incarceration, 30 months of probation, 60 hours of community service, $500 restitution; $10 special assessment. On 12/14/2023 the court granted her Termination of Probation.	Ianni received a full pardon on January 20, 2025
July 20, 2021	Mark Sami Ibrahim	Federal: Entering ... in a Restricted Building or Grounds with a Deadly or Dangerous Weapon; Injuries to Property; Firearms and Dangerous Weapons on Capitol Grounds; False Statements and Representations	Ibrahim pleaded Not Guilty to all charges. On 10/27/2022, the court dismisses Count 4, False Statements and Representations.	Stipulated bench trial set for 1/23/2025. On 1/22/2025, the court grants the government's motion to dismiss the case with prejudice.	
May 29, 2024	Eugenia Inks	Federal: Entering ... in a Restricted Building or Grounds; Disorderly ... in a Restricted Building or Grounds; Disorderly Conduct in a Capitol Building or Grounds; Parading ... in a Capitol Building		On 1/22/2025, the court grants the government's motion to dismiss the case with prejudice.	
May 29, 2024	Richard Inks	Federal: Entering ... in a Restricted Building or Grounds; Disorderly ... in a Restricted Building or Grounds; Disorderly Conduct in a Capitol Building or Grounds; Parading ... in a Capitol Building		On 1/22/2025, the court grants the government's motion to dismiss the case with prejudice.	
March 16, 2021	Elias Irizarry	Federal: Entering ... in a Restricted Building or Grounds; Disorderly ... in a Restricted Building or Grounds; Disorderly Conduct in a Capitol Building; Parading ... in a Capitol Building	Irizarry pleaded Guilty to one charge: Entering ... in a Restricted Building or Grounds. The other charges are dismissed.	Sentenced on 3/15/2023 to 14 days incarceration; Special Assessment of $25 and Restitution of $500.	Irizarry received a full pardon on January 20, 2025. In June 2026, it was reported that Irizarry was a political appointee to the U.S. Pentagon’s Special Operations and Low Intensity Conflict office, which works on senstitive counterterrorism operations.
August 17, 2021	Joseph Irwin	Federal: Obstruction of an Official Proceeding; Entering ... in a Restricted Building or Grounds with a Deadly or Dangerous Weapon; Disorderly ... in a Restricted Building or Grounds with a Deadly or Dangerous Weapon; Entering ... on the Floor of Congress; Disorderly Conduct in a Capitol Building; Parading ... in a Capitol Building	Irwin pleaded Not Guilty to all charges. Found Guilty in a Bench trial on 5/14/2024 on all charges. The court vacated the Obstruction conviction on 11/22/2024.	Sentencing reset for 1/22/2025. On 1/21/2025, the court grants the government's motion to dismiss the case with prejudice.	
May 27, 2021	William Isaacs	Federal: Conspiracy to Obstruct an Official Proceeding; Obstruction of an Official Proceeding and Aiding and Abetting; Conspiracy to Prevent an Officer from Discharging Any Duties; Destruction of Government Property and Aiding and Abetting; Entering ... in a Restricted Building or Grounds; Civil Disorder and Aiding and Abetting (2 counts)	Isaacs pleaded Not Guilty to all charges. Jury trial verdict on 3/20/2023 finds Isaacs Guilty on all counts.	Sentenced on 8/31/2023 to 5 years of probation, the first 18 months to be served on home detention; $625 special assessment; 500 hours community service.	Isaacs received a full pardon on January 20, 2025
June 15, 2022	Traci Isaacs	Federal: Altering, Destroying, Mutilating, or Concealing a Record, Document, or Other Object; Entering ... in a Restricted Building or Grounds; Disorderly ... in a Restricted Building or Grounds; Disorderly Conduct in a Capitol Building; Parading ... in a Capitol Building	Isaacs pleaded Guilty to one charge: Altering, Destroying, Mutilating, or Concealing a Record, Document, or Other Object.	Sentenced on 1/12/2024 to 1 year and one day of incarceration; one year of supervised release; $2,000 restitution; $100 special assessment.	Isaacs received a full pardon on January 20, 2025
March 04, 2021	Bryan Wayne Ivey	Federal: Entering ... in a Restricted Building or Grounds; Disorderly ... in a Restricted Building or Grounds; Disorderly Conduct in a Capitol Building; Parading ... in a Capitol Building	Ivey pleaded Guilty to one charge: Parading ... in a Capitol Building. The other charges are dismissed.	Sentenced to 36 months of Probation; 60 days location monitoring/home detention; $10 special assessment; $500 in restitution.	Ivey received a full pardon on January 20, 2025
March 30, 2021	Arthur Jackman	Federal: Obstruction of an Official Proceeding; Entering ... in a Restricted Building or Grounds; Disorderly ... in a Restricted Building or Grounds; Entering ... in the Gallery of Congress; Disorderly Conduct in a Capitol Building; Parading ... in a Capitol Building; Theft of Government Property	Jackman pleaded Guilty to one charge: Entering ... in a Restricted Building or Grounds.	Sentencing reset for 1/29/2025. On 1/22/2025, the court grants the government's motion to dismiss the case with prejudice.	
January 19, 2021	Emanuel Jackson	Federal: Obstructing or Impeding Certain Officers; Assaulting ... Certain Officers; Entering ... in a Restricted Building	Jackson pleaded Not Guilty to all charges.	On 1/22/2025, the court grants the government's motion to dismiss the case with prejudice.	
May 18, 2021	Micajah Joel Jackson	Federal: Entering ... in a Restricted Building; Disorderly ... in a Restricted Building; Violent Entry and Disorderly Conduct in a Capitol Building; Parading ... in a Capitol Building	Jackson pleaded Guilty to one charge: Parading ... in a Capitol Building. The other charges are dismissed.	Sentenced 3/24/2022 to 36 months of probation, including 90 days in a residential re-entry center; $1,000 fine, $500 restitution; $10 special assessment.	Jackson received a full pardon on January 20, 2025
June 07, 2022	Brian Scott Jackson	Federal: Civil Disorder; Assaulting ... Certain Officers Using a Dangerous Weapon; Entering ... in a Restricted Building or Grounds with a Deadly or Dangerous Weapon; Disorderly ... in a Restricted Building or Grounds with a Deadly or Dangerous Weapon; Engaging in Physical Violence in a Restricted Building or Grounds with a Deadly or Dangerous Weapon; Act of Physical Violence in the Capitol Grounds or Buildings	Jackson pleaded Guilty to one lesser charge: Assaulting ... Certain Officers. The other charges are dismissed.	Sentenced on 8/6/2024 to 37 Months of Incarceration; 36 months of supervised release with conditions; Special Assessment: $100; Restitution: $2,000; 60 hours of community service.	Jackson received a full pardon on January 20, 2025
June 07, 2022	Adam Lejay Jackson	Federal: Civil Disorder; Assaulting ... Certain Officers Using a Dangerous Weapon; Entering ... in a Restricted Building or Grounds with a Deadly or Dangerous Weapon; Disorderly ... in a Restricted Building or Grounds with a Deadly or Dangerous Weapon; Engaging in Physical Violence in a Restricted Building or Grounds with a Deadly or Dangerous Weapon; Act of Physical Violence in the Capitol Grounds or Buildings	Jackson pleaded Guilty to one charge: Assaulting ... Certain Officers Using a Dangerous Weapon. The other charges are dismissed.	Sentenced on 3/21/2024 to 36 months of Probation; 52 intermittent weekend of incarceration; Special Assessment of $100; Fine of $4,392; Restitution of $2,000.	Jackson received a full pardon on January 20, 2025
November 02, 2023	Dominic Jakubowski	Federal: Disorderly ... in a Restricted Building or Grounds	Jakubowski pleaded Guilty to the charge.	Sentenced on 8/29/2024 to 24 months of probation with the first 60 days to be served on home detention; Special Assessment of $25; Restitution of $500; $5,000 fine; 60 hours of community service.	Jakubowski received a full pardon on January 20, 2025
March 09, 2021	Joshua A. James	Federal: Seditious Conspiracy; Conspiracy to Obstruct an Official Proceeding; Obstruction of an Official Proceeding and Aiding and Abetting; Conspiracy to Prevent an Officer from Discharging Any Duties; Civil Disorder and Aiding and Abetting; Assaulting ... Certain Officers; Tampering with Documents or Proceedings and Aiding and Abetting	James pleaded Guilty to two charges: Seditious Conspiracy and Obstruction of an Official Proceeding. The other charges are dismissed.	Sentenced on 12/20/2024 to concurrent term of probation as to Counts 1 and 3; special assessment of $200; restitution of $2,000.	James received a full pardon on January 20, 2025
October 04, 2021	Aaron James	Federal: Civil Disorder (2 counts); Assaulting ... Certain Officers Using a Dangerous Weapon; Entering ... in a Restricted Building or Grounds with a Deadly or Dangerous Weapon; Disorderly ... in a Restricted Building or Grounds with a Deadly or Dangerous Weapon; Engaging in Physical Violence in a Restricted Building or Grounds with a Deadly or Dangerous Weapon; Disorderly Conduct in a Capitol Building; Act of Physical Violence in the Capitol Grounds or Buildings; Parading ... in a Capitol Building	James pleaded Not Guilty to all charges.	Jury trial scheduled for 8/4/2025. On 1/21/2025, the court grants the government's motion to dismiss the case with prejudice	
February 23, 2021	Derek Jancart	Federal: Entering ... in a Restricted Building or Grounds; Disorderly ... in a Restricted Building or Grounds; Disorderly Conduct in a Capitol Building; Parading ... in a Capitol Building	Jancart pleaded Guilty to one charge: Disorderly Conduct in a Capitol Building. The other charges were dismissed.	Sentenced 9/29/2021 to 45 days in jail; $10 assessment; and $500 restitution.	Jancart received a full pardon on January 20, 2025
November 07, 2023	Sergio Herrera Jaramillo	Federal: Entering ... in a Restricted Building or Grounds; Disorderly ... in a Restricted Building or Grounds; Disorderly Conduct in a Capitol Building; Parading ... in a Capitol Building.		On 1/22/2025, the court grants the government's motion to dismiss the case with prejudice.	
March 08, 2022	Raul Eduardo Jarrin	Federal: Entering ... in a Restricted Building; Disorderly ... in a Restricted Building; Violent Entry and Disorderly Conduct in a Capitol Building; Parading ... in a Capitol Building	Jarrin pleaded Guilty to one charge: Parading ... in a Capitol Building. The other charges are dismissed.	Sentenced on 6/23/2023 to 14 days incarceration; 36 months probation; $500 restitution; $10 special assessment.	Jarrin received a full pardon on January 20, 2025
August 08, 2023	Yesenia Jaure	Federal: Parading ... in a Capitol Building	Jaure pleaded Guilty to the charge.	Sentenced on 1/12/2024 to 24 months of probation; Special assessment of $10; Restitution of $500.	Jaure received a full pardon on January 20, 2025
March 02, 2022	Iraj George Javid	Federal: Entering ... in a Restricted Building or Grounds; Disorderly ... in a Restricted Building or Grounds; Disorderly Conduct in a Capitol Building; Parading ... in a Capitol Building	Javid pleaded Guilty to one charge: Parading ... in a Capitol Building. The other charges are dismissed.	Sentenced 2/3/2022 to 24 months Probation with 90 days of home detention; special assessment of $10; restitution of $500.	Javid received a full pardon on January 20, 2025
March 05, 2021	Shane Leedon Jenkins	Federal: Civil Disorder; Obstruction of an Official Proceeding; Assaulting ... Certain Officers Using a Dangerous Weapon; Theft of Government Property; Destruction of Government Property; Entering ... in a Restricted Building or Grounds with a Deadly or Dangerous Weapon; Disorderly ... in a Restricted Building or Grounds with a Deadly or Dangerous Weapon; Engaging in Physical Violence in a Restricted Building or Grounds with a Deadly or Dangerous Weapon; Disorderly Conduct in the Capitol Grounds or Building; Act of Physical Violence in the Capitol Grounds or Buildings	Jenkins pleaded Not Guilty to all charges. On 3/29/2023 he was found Guilty in a Jury trial on nine charges. Not Guilty of Theft of Government Property.	Sentenced on 10/6/2023 to 84 months incarceration; 36 months of supervised release; $5,176 in restitution; $720 special assessment.	Jenkins received a full pardon on January 20, 2025
September 12, 2023	Allan Jennings	Federal: Civil Disorder; Destruction of Government Property	Jennings pleaded Guilty to both charges.	Sentenced on 10/4/2024 to 12 months incarceration; 36 months of supervised release; Special Assessment of $125; Fine of $1,000; Restitution of $2,825.	Jennings received a full pardon on January 20, 2025
January 9, 2021	Douglas Austin Jensen	Federal: Civil Disorder; Obstruction of an Official Proceeding; Assaulting ... Certain Officers or Employees; Entering ... Restricted Building; Disorderly ... Restricted Building; Violent Entry and Disorderly Conduct in a Capitol Building; Parading ... in a Capitol Building	Not Guilty – all charges	Found guilty of all charges and sentenced to 5 years in prison	Seen in a video aggressively leading a mob up the stairs to the second floor of the Capitol. The mob was diverted by Capitol Police officer Eugene Goodman, who was awarded for this act.
September 12, 2023	Allan Jennings	Federal: Civil Disorder; Destruction of Government Property	Jennings pleaded Guilty to both charges.	Sentenced on 10/4/2024 to 12 months incarceration; 36 months of supervised release; Special Assessment of $125; Fine of $1,000; Restitution of $2,825.	Jennings received a full pardon on January 20, 2025
December 02, 2021	Justin Jersey	Federal: Inflicting Bodily Injury on Certain Officers and Aiding and Abetting; Assaulting ... Certain Officers Using a Dangerous Weapon; Civil Disorder; Entering ... in a Restricted Building or Grounds with a Deadly or Dangerous Weapon; Disorderly ... in a Restricted Building or Grounds with a Deadly or Dangerous Weapon; Engaging in Physical Violence in a Restricted Building or Grounds with a Deadly or Dangerous Weapon; Act of Physical Violence in the Capitol Grounds or Buildings	Jersey pleaded Guilty to one charge: Inflicting Bodily Injury on Certain Officers. The other charges are dismissed.	Sentenced 2/10/2023 to 51 Months of Imprisonment (with credit for time served); Supervised Release of 36 months with conditions; Special Assessment of $100; Restitution of $32,165.65.	Jersey received a full pardon on January 20, 2025
February 11, 2021	Taylor James Johnatakis	Federal: Obstruction of an Official Proceeding; Assaulting ... Certain Officers; Civil Disorder; Entering ... in a Restricted Building or Grounds; Disorderly ... in a Restricted Building or Grounds; Engaging in Physical Violence in a Restricted Building or Grounds; Act of Physical Violence in the Capitol Grounds or Buildings	Johnatakis pleaded Not Guilty to all charges. In a Jury trial held on 11/21/2023 he was found Guilty on all charges.	Sentenced on 4/3/2024 to 87 months incarceration; 36 months supervised release; restitution in the amount of $2,000; special assessment in the amount of $385.	Johnatakis received a full pardon on January 20, 2025
January 8, 2021	Adam Christian Johnson	Federal: Entering ... Restricted Building		Sentenced to 75 days in jail, followed by a year of supervised release, 200 hours of community service, a $5,000 fine, and $500 in restitution.	36-year-old man from Parrish, Florida, who was photographed carrying a lectern from Nancy Pelosi's office. The Miami Herald reported he had posted on social media comments that "disparaged the Black Lives Matter movement" and police "who defend First Amendment protected rights".
February 22, 2024	Andrew Joshua Johnson	Federal: Civil Disorder; Entering ... in a Restricted Building or Grounds; Disorderly ... in a Restricted Building or Grounds; Entering ... in Certain Rooms in the Capitol Building; Disorderly Conduct in a Capitol Building; Parading ... in a Capitol Building	Johnson pleaded Not Guilty to all charges.	Jury trial set for 2/10/2025. On 1/22/2025, the court grants the government's motion to dismiss the case with prejudice.	
December 08, 2022	Andrew Paul Johnson	DC/Federal: DC: Unlawful Entry (Public Property) FEDERAL: Entering ... in a Restricted Building or Grounds; Disorderly ... in a Restricted Building or Grounds; Disorderly Conduct in a Capitol Building; Parading ... in a Capitol Building	DC charge: Case Disposed - Nolle Prosequi on 12/14/2022. Federal charges: Johnson pleaded Guilty to all charges on 4/15/2024.	Sentenced on 8/22/2024 to 12 months incarceration; 12 month term of Supervised Release; Special Assessments totaling $70; Restitution of $500; $2,336 Fine.	Johnson received a full pardon on January 20, 2025. In November 2025, Johnson was charged with sex crimes against two children. In March 2026 Johnson was found guilty and sentenced to life in prison on the charges.
June 11, 2021	Daniel Johnson	Federal: Civil Disorder; Entering ... in a Restricted Building; Disorderly ... in a Restricted Building; Violent Entry and Disorderly Conduct in a Capitol Building; Parading ... in a Capitol Building	Johnson pleaded Guilty to one charge: Civil Disorder. The other charges are dismissed.	Sentenced 6/1/22 to 4 months incarceration, 1 year of supervised release, $2,000 in restitution, $100 special assessment.	Johnson received a full pardon on January 20, 2025
June 11, 2021	Daryl Johnson	Federal: Civil Disorder; Entering ... in a Restricted Building; Disorderly ... in a Restricted Building; Violent Entry and Disorderly Conduct in a Capitol Building; Parading ... in a Capitol Building	Johnson pleaded Guilty to one charge: Civil Disorder. The other charges are dismissed.	Sentenced 6/1/22 to 30 days incarceration, 1 year of supervised release, a $2,000 fine, $2,000 in restitution, $100 special assessment.	Johnson received a full pardon on January 20, 2025
August 31, 2023	Jack Mitchell Johnson	Federal: Entering ... in a Restricted Building or Grounds; Disorderly ... in a Restricted Building or Grounds; Disorderly Conduct in a Capitol Building; Parading ... in a Capitol Building	Johnson pleaded Guilty to two charges: Disorderly Conduct in a Capitol Building; Parading ... in a Capitol Building. The other charges are dismissed.	Sentenced on 9/23/2024 to 7 days incarceration; 12 Months of Probation; $20 Special Assessment; $500 Restitution; 60 hours of community service.	Johnson received a full pardon on January 20, 2025
March 23, 2022	Joshua Edward Johnson	Federal: Obstruction of an Official Proceeding and Aiding and Abetting; Entering ... in a Restricted Building or Grounds; Disorderly ... in a Restricted Building or Grounds; Entering ... on the Floor of Congress; Disorderly Conduct in a Capitol Building; Parading ... in a Capitol Building	Johnson pleaded Guilty to one charge: Obstruction of an Official Proceeding. The other charges are dismissed.	Sentenced on 7/6/2023 to 24 months incarceration; 24 months of supervised release; $100 special assessment; $2,000 in restitution.	Johnson received a full pardon on January 20, 2025
April 13, 2021	Paul Russell Johnson	Federal: Civil Disorder; Assaulting ... Certain Officers Using a Dangerous Weapon, Inflicting Bodily Injury, and Aiding and Abetting (2 counts); Entering ... in a Restricted Building or Grounds with a Deadly or Dangerous Weapon; Disorderly ... in a Restricted building or Grounds with a Deadly or Dangerous Weapon; Engaging in Physical Violence in a Restricted Building or Grounds with a Deadly or Dangerous Weapons, Resulting in Significant Bodily Injury and Aiding and Abetting; Disorderly Conduct in a Capitol Building; Act of Physical Violence in the Capitol Grounds or Buildings and Aiding and Abetting; Obstruction of an Official Proceeding and Aiding and Abetting	Johnson pleaded Not Guilty to all charges. Bench trial verdict on 2/2/2024 finds him Guilty on five charges: Civil Disorder; Assaulting ... Certain Officers Using a Dangerous Weapon, Inflicting Bodily Injury, and Aiding and Abetting; Disorderly Conduct in a Capitol Building or Grounds; Act of Physical Violence in the Capitol Grounds or Buildings and Aiding and Abetting; Obstruction of an Official Proceeding and Aiding and Abetting. Not Guilty on four charges. On 9/3/2024, the Court orders dismissal of the Obstruction conviction.	Sentenced on 9/19/2024 to five years of probation, with intermittent confinement on the weekends for the first year; two years of home confinement; $25,000 fine; $2,000 in restitution.	Johnson received a full pardon on January 20, 2025
December 18, 2024	Steve Elijah Johnson, Jr.	Federal: Assaulting ... Certain Officers; Obstruction of Law Enforcement Officers during a Civil Disorder; Entering ... in a Restricted Building or Grounds; Disorderly ... in a Restricted Building or Grounds; Engaging in Physical violence in a Restricted building or grounds; Disorderly or Disruptive Conduct in a Capitol Building or Grounds; Act of Physical Violence in the Capitol Grounds or Buildings		On 1/31/2025, the court grants the government's motion to dismiss the case with prejudice	
May 26, 2022	Thaddis Derone Johnson Jr.	Federal: Entering ... in a Restricted Building or Grounds; Disorderly ... in a Restricted Building or Grounds; Disorderly Conduct on Capitol Grounds; Parading ... in a Capitol Building	Johnson, Jr. pleaded Guilty to one charge: Parading ... in a Capitol Building. The other charges are dismissed.	Sentenced on 12/19/2022 to 24 months probation with 6 months on home detention and 180 days location monitoring; Special Assessment of $10 and Restitution of $500; 60 hours community service.	Johnson received a full pardon on January 20, 2025
February 22, 2024	Whitney Johnson	Federal: Civil Disorder; Assaulting ... Certain Officers; Entering ... in a Restricted Building or Grounds; Disorderly ... in a Restricted Building or Grounds; Engage in Physical Violence in a Restricted Building or Grounds; Disorderly Conduct in a Capitol Building; Act of Physical Violence in the Capitol Grounds or Buildings; Parading ... in a Capitol Building	Johnson pleaded Not Guilty to all charges.	Jury trial set for 2/10/2025. On 1/22/2025, the court grants the government's motion to dismiss the case with prejudice.	
January 13, 2022	Zachary Johnson	Federal: Civil Disorder; Assaulting ... Certain Officers Using a Dangerous Weapon; Entering ... in a Restricted Building or Grounds with a Deadly or Dangerous Weapon; Disorderly ... in a Restricted Building or Grounds with a Deadly or Dangerous Weapon; Engaging in Physical Violence in a Restricted Building or Grounds with a Deadly or Dangerous Weapon; Disorderly Conduct in the Capitol Grounds or Buildings	Johnson pleaded Guilty to one charge: Assaulting ... Certain Officers (lesser charge). The other charges are dismissed.	Sentenced on 11/30/2023 to 42 months of incarceration; 36 months of supervised release; $100 special assessment; $2,000 restitution.	Johnson received a full pardon on January 20, 2025
September 26, 2024	Damian Johnston	Federal: Disorderly Conduct in a Capitol Building; Parading ... in a Capitol Building	Johnston pleaded Guilty to both charges.	Sentencing set for 2/20/2025. On 1/27/2025, the court grants the government's motion to dismiss the case with prejudice.	
May 20, 2022	David Charles Johnston	Federal: Entering ... in a Restricted Building or Grounds; Disorderly ... in a Restricted Building or Grounds; Disorderly Conduct on Capitol Grounds; Parading ... in a Capitol Building	Johnston pleaded Guilty to one charge: Parading ... in a Capitol Building. The other charges are dismissed.	Sentenced on 12/16/2022 to 36 months Probation with 21 days of intermittent confinement and 90 days location monitoring; special assessment of $10; a fine of $2,500; and restitution of $500.	Johnston received a full pardon on January 20, 2025
June 07, 2023	Jay James Johnston	Federal: Civil Disorder; Entering or Remaining in a Restricted Building or Grounds; Disorderly or Disruptive Conduct in a Restricted Building or Grounds; Impeding Passage through the Capitol Grounds or Buildings	Johnston pleaded Guilty to one charge: Civil Disorder. The other charges are dismissed.	Sentenced on 10/28/2024 to 12 Months and 1 Day of Incarceration; 24 Months of Supervised Release; 40 hours of community service; Restitution of $2,000; Special Assessment of $100.	Johnston received a full pardon on January 20, 2025
March 25, 2022	Brian Raymond Jones	Federal: Entering ... in a Restricted Building or Grounds; Disorderly ... in a Restricted Building or Grounds; Disorderly Conduct in a Capitol Building; Parading ... in a Capitol Building	Jones pleaded Guilty to one charge: Parading ... in a Capitol Building. The other charges are dismissed.	Sentenced on 5/9/2023 to 24 months of Probation; $10 Special Assessment; Restitution of $500; 60 hours of community service.	Jones received a full pardon on January 20, 2025
March 27, 2021	Caleb Jones	Federal: Entering ... in a Restricted Building; Disorderly ... in a Restricted Building; Violent Entry and Disorderly Conduct in a Capitol Building; Parading ... in a Capitol Building	Jones pleaded Guilty to one charge: Parading ... in a Capitol Building. The other charges are dismissed.	Sentenced 12/1/2021 to 24 months Probation, the first 2 months under Home Confinement; 100 hours community service; $500 Restitution; and a Special Assessment of $10.	Jones received a full pardon on January 20, 2025
January 16, 2021	Chad Barrett Jones	Federal: Civil Disorder and Aiding and Abetting; Destruction of Government Property Exceeding $1,000; Obstruction of an Official Proceeding and Aiding and Abetting; Entering ... Restricted Building with a Deadly or Dangerous Weapon; Disorderly ... Restricted Building with a Deadly or Dangerous Weapon; Engaging in Physical Violence in a Restricted Building with a Deadly or Dangerous Weapon; Disorderly Conduct in a Capitol Building; Act of Physical Violence in the Capitol Building; Parading ... in Capitol	Not Guilty – all charges		42-year-old man from Coxs Creek, Kentucky, accused of breaking the window that Ashli Babbitt tried climbing through before being shot. He was arrested in Louisville charged with assaulting a federal officer, destroying government property worth over $1,000, unlawfully entering a restricted building, violent entry and disorderly conduct. Per the affidavit, he is seen in a video wearing a gray sock cap and a jacket with a red hood, striking at the window with a wooden flagpole. A relative identified him to the FBI, stating that he had gone to a Trump rally in Washington, D.C. in the past too and learnt of his plans for travel through Facebook. The affidavit also states the man admitted to a friend on January 7 that he had broken a window.
August 26, 2024	Clayton Jones, Jr.	Federal: Entering ... in a Restricted Building or Grounds; Disorderly ... in a Restricted Building or Grounds; Disorderly Conduct in a Capitol Building or Grounds; Parading ... in a Capitol Building	Jones pleaded Not Guilty to all charges. Jury Trial set for 8/25/2025.	On 1/21/2025, the court grants the government's motion to dismiss the case with prejudice.	
December 14, 2023	Karen Jane Jones	Federal: Entering ... in a Restricted Building or Grounds; Disorderly ... in a Restricted Building or Grounds; Disorderly Conduct in a Capitol Building or Grounds; Parading ... in a Capitol Building	Jones pleaded Guilty to one charge: Entering ... in a Restricted Building or Grounds. The other charges are dismissed.	Sentenced on 9/5/2024 to 36 months probation; 90 days location monitoring; $25 special assessment; $500 restitution; $2,500 fine.	Jones received a full pardon on January 20, 2025
December 14, 2023	Robert Walter Jones	Federal: Entering ... in a Restricted Building or Grounds; Disorderly ... in a Restricted Building or Grounds; Disorderly Conduct in a Capitol Building or Grounds; Parading ... in a Capitol Building	Jones pleaded Guilty to one charge: Entering ... in a Restricted Building or Grounds. The other charges are dismissed.	Sentenced on 9/5/2024 to 36 months probation; 90 days location monitoring; $25 special assessment; $500 restitution; $2,500 fine.	Jones received a full pardon on January 20, 2025
October 02, 2024	Christopher Jordan	Federal: Civil Disorder; Assaulting ... Certain Officers; Entering or Remaining in a Restricted Building or Grounds; Disorderly ... in a Restricted Building or Grounds; Disorderly Conduct in a Capitol Building	Jordan pleaded Not Guilty to all charges.	On 1/21/2025, the court grants the government's motion to dismiss the case with prejudice.	
October 02, 2024	Earl Jordan	Federal: Civil Disorder; Assaulting ... Certain Officers; Entering or Remaining in a Restricted Building or Grounds; Disorderly ... in a Restricted Building or Grounds; Disorderly Conduct in a Capitol Building	Jordan pleaded Not Guilty to all charges.	On 1/21/2025, the court grants the government's motion to dismiss the case with prejudice.	
January 18, 2023	Micaiah Joseph	Federal: Civil Disorder; Assaulting ... Certain Officers and Aiding and Abetting; Entering ... in a Restricted Building or Grounds; Disorderly ... in a Restricted Building or Grounds; Engaging in Physical Violence in a Restricted Building or Grounds; Impeding Passage Through the Capitol Grounds or Buildings	Joseph pleaded Not Guilty to all charges. Found Guilty on all charges in a Jury trial on 6/10/2024.	Sentenced on 11/12/2024 to 37 Months of Incarceration; 36 months of supervised release; Special Assessment: $285; Restitution: $2,000.	Joseph received a full pardon on January 20, 2025
October 03, 2024	Predrag Jovanovic	Federal: Civil Disorder; Assaulting ... Certain Officers; Entering ... in a Restricted Building or Grounds; Disorderly ... in a Restricted Building or Grounds; Disorderly Conduct in a Capitol Building; Impeding Passage Through the Capitol Grounds or Buildings		On 1/22/2025, the court ordered that the case is dismissed without prejudice	
March 12, 2024	Nicole Marie Joyner	Federal: Entering ... in a Restricted Building or Grounds; Disorderly ... in a Restricted Building or Grounds; Disorderly Conduct in a Capitol Building; Parading ... in a Capitol Building	In a Jury trial on 10/23/2024, Joyner was found Guilty on all charges.	Sentencing set for 1/23/2025. On 1/21/2025, the court grants the government's motion to dismiss the case with prejudice	
October 29, 2024	David Michael Joynt	Federal: Entering ... in a Restricted Building or Grounds; Disorderly ... in a Restricted Building or Grounds; Disorderly Conduct in a Capitol Building; Parading ... in a Capitol Building	Joynt pleaded Not Guilty to all charges.	On 1/27/2025, the court grants the government's motion to dismiss the case with prejudice.	
March 26, 2021	David Lee Judd	Federal: Assaulting ... Certain Officers and Aiding and Abetting; Assaulting ... Certain Officers Using a Dangerous Weapon; Obstruction of an Official Proceeding and Aiding and Abetting; Civil Disorder; Disorderly ... Restricted Building or Grounds with a Deadly or Dangerous Weapon; Engaging in Physical Violence in a Restricted Building or Grounds with a Deadly or Dangerous Weapon; Disorderly Conduct in a Capitol Building; Act of Physical Violence in the Capitol Grounds or Buildings	Not Guilty – all charges	32 months’ incarceration, 24 months’ supervised release, $2,000 restitution	35-year-old man from Carrollton, Texas. Court documents show him wearing a "Make America Great Again" hat; he was seen on video handling riot gear that had been stolen from police and verbally instructing others to continue dispersing them. He is also accused of lighting and throwing a firecracker at police.
May 19, 2021	John Juran	Federal: Entering ... in a Restricted Building; Disorderly ... in a Restricted Building; Violent Entry and Disorderly Conduct; Parading ... in a Capitol Building	Juran pleaded Guilty to one charge: Parading ... in a Capitol Building. The other charges are dismissed.	Sentenced 2/23/2022 to 3 years of Probation; 60 days home detention/location monitoring; Special Assessment of $10; Fine of $500; Restitution of $500.	Juran received a full pardon on January 20, 2025
June 28, 2021	Zvonimir Joseph Jurlina	Federal: Act of Physical Violence on Capitol Grounds	Jurlina pleaded Guilty to the charge: Act of Physical Violence on Capitol Grounds.	Sentenced on 7/20/2023 to 14 days incarceration; 24 months probation; special assessment of $10; restitution of $500.	Jurlina received a full pardon on January 20, 2025
July 06, 2023	Ralph Kahler	Federal: Parading ... in a Capitol Building	Kahler pleaded Guilty to the charge.	Sentenced on 2/2/2024 to 12 months of Probation with 30 days location monitoring; Special Assessment: $10; Restitution: $500; Fine: $1,098; 40 hours of community service.	Kahler received a full pardon on January 20, 2025
July 06, 2023	Suzanne Kahler	Federal: Parading ... in a Capitol Building	Kahler pleaded Guilty to the charge.	Sentenced on 2/2/2024 to 12 months of Probation with 30 days location monitoring; Special Assessment: $10; Restitution: $500; Fine: $1,098; 40 hours of community service.	Kahler received a full pardon on January 20, 2025
March 16, 2022	Riley D. Kasper	Federal: Civil Disorder; Assaulting ... Certain Officers Using a Deadly or Dangerous Weapon; Entering ... in a Restricted Building or Grounds with a Deadly or Dangerous Weapon; Disorderly ... in a Restricted Building or Grounds with a Deadly or Dangerous Weapon; Engaging in Physical Violence in a Restricted Building or Grounds with a Deadly or Dangerous Weapon; Act of Physical Violence in the Capitol Grounds or Buildings	Kasper pleaded Guilty to one lesser charge: Assaulting ... Certain Officers. The other charges are dismissed.	Sentenced on 2/6/2024 to 37 months of incarceration; 2 years of supervised release; $2,000 restitution; $100 special assessment.	Kasper received a full pardon on January 20, 2025
March 28, 2024	Daphne Kasperek	Federal: Disorderly ... in a Restricted Building or Grounds	Kasperek pleaded Guilty to the charge.	Sentencing reset for 2/7/2025. On 1/22/2025, the court grants the government's motion to dismiss the case with prejudice.	
March 28, 2024	Thomas Kasperek	Federal: Disorderly ... in a Restricted Building or Grounds	Kasperek pleaded Guilty to the charge.	Sentencing reset for 2/7/2025. On 1/22/2025, the court grants the government's motion to dismiss the case with prejudice	
December 08, 2021	Jared Kastner	Federal: Entering ... in a Restricted Building or Grounds; Disorderly ... in a Restricted Building or Grounds; Disorderly Conduct in a Capitol Building; Parading ... in a Capitol Building	Kastner pleaded Not Guilty to all charges. Found Guilty on all charges in a Jury trial on 4/11/2024.	Sentenced on 10/23/2024 to 5 months of incarceration; 1 year of Supervised Release; $70 Special Assessment.	Kastner received a full pardon on January 20, 2025
January 10, 2023	William Glynn Keen	Federal: Entering ... in a Restricted Building or Grounds; Disorderly ... in a Restricted Building or Grounds; Disorderly Conduct in a Capitol Building; Parading ... in a Capitol Building	Keen pleaded Guilty to one charge: Parading ... in a Capitol Building. The other charges are dismissed.	Sentenced on 1/10/2024 to 18 months of probation; $10 Special Assessment; $500 Restitution.	Keen received a full pardon on January 20, 2025
April 06, 2023	Quinn Keen	Federal: Civil Disorder; Assaulting ... Certain Officers (3 counts); Entering ... in a Restricted Building or Grounds; Disorderly ... in a Restricted Building or Grounds; Engaging in Physical Violence in a Restricted Building or Grounds; Disorderly Conduct in a Capitol Building; Parading ... in the Capitol Grounds or Buildings	Keen pleaded Guilty to one charge: Assaulting ... Certain Officers. The other charges are dismissed.	Sentenced on 6/27/2024 to 24 months of Incarceration; 24 months of Supervised Release (with conditions); $100 Special Assessment; Restitution of $2,000.	Keen received a full pardon on January 20, 2025
January 14, 2021	Klete Keller	Federal: Civil Disorder; Obstruction of an Official Proceeding; Entering ... Restricted Building or Grounds; Disorderly ... Restricted Building or Grounds; Disorderly Conduct in a Capitol Building; Impeding Passage Through the Capitol Grounds or Buildings; Parading ... in a Capitol Building	Guilty – one charge: Obstruction of an Official Proceeding.		Former Olympic gold medalist swimmer. He turned himself in to officials. He had been identified by his height, 6 ft 6 in (198 cm), and by wearing an official US Olympic team jacket without obscuring his face.
May 05, 2022	Edward Kelley	Federal: Civil Disorder; Obstruction of an Official Proceeding and Aiding and Abetting; Assaulting ... Certain Officers; Destruction of Government Property (2 counts); Entering ... in a Restricted Building or Grounds; Disorderly ... in a Restricted Building or Grounds; Engaging in Physical Violence in a Restricted Building or Grounds; Entering ... in the Gallery of Congress; Disorderly Conduct in a Capitol Building; Act of Physical Violence in the Capitol Grounds or Buildings; Parading ... in a Capitol Building	Kelley pleaded Not Guilty to all charges. Bench trial begun on 10/28/2024 and verdict on 11/8/2024 of Guilty on all charges but one: Obstruction.	Sentencing set for 4/27/2025. On 1/22/2025, the court grants the government's motion to dismiss the case with prejudice.	Kelley was convicted along with another man in a plot to attack the Knoxville, Tennessee FBI office and kill law enforcement officers involved in his January 6 Capitol attack arrest. He was sentenced to life in prison.
February 26, 2021	Kari Dawn Kelley	Federal: Entering ... in a Restricted Building or Grounds; Disorderly ... in a Restricted Building or Grounds; Disorderly Conduct in a Capitol Building or Grounds; Parading ... in a Capitol Building	Kelley pleaded Guilty to one charge: Parading ... in a Capitol Building. The other charges are dismissed.	Sentenced 3/17/2022 to 36 months of probation, $500 restitution; $10 special assessment.	Kelley received a full pardon on January 20, 2025
June 09, 2022	Ryan D. Kelley	Federal: Entering ... in a Restricted Building or Grounds; Disorderly ... in a Restricted Building or Grounds; Knowingly Engage in any Act of Physical Violence Against Person or Property in any Restricted Building or Grounds; Willfully Injure or Commit any Depredation Against any Property of the United States	Kelley pleaded Guilty to one charge: Entering ... in a Restricted Building or Grounds. The other charges are dismissed.	Sentenced on 10/17/2023 to 60 days incarceration; one year of supervised release; $25 special assessment; a $5,000 fine; $500 in restitution.	Kelley received a full pardon on January 20, 2025
June 27, 2024	Brian Leo Kelly	Federal: Entering ... in a Restricted Building or Grounds; Disorderly ... in a Restricted Building or Grounds; Disorderly Conduct in a Capitol Building or Grounds; Parading ... in a Capitol Building	Kelly pleaded Guilty to two charges: Disorderly Conduct in a Capitol Building or Grounds; Parading ... in a Capitol Building. The other charges are dismissed.	Sentenced on 1/17/2025 to 10 Days of Incarceration; 24 Months of Probation; $20 Special Assessment; $500 in Restitution.	Kelly received a full pardon on January 20, 2025
January 20, 2021	Christopher M. Kelly	Federal: Obstruction of an Official Proceeding; Aiding and Abetting; Unlawful Entry to Restricted Building or Grounds; Violent Entry and Disorderly Conduct	All charges against Christopher Kelly were dismissed without prejudice on June 2, 2021. The Department of Justice stated in a court filing that, "upon reflection of the facts currently known to the government," dismissing the case "serves the interests of justice," but did not elaborate further.		
January 21, 2021	Kash Lee Kelly	Federal: Parading ... in a Capitol Building	Kelly pleaded Guilty to the charge.	Sentenced on 11/10/2022 to 60 Days of Incarceration, 30 days to run consecutively to any other sentence and 30 days to run concurrently to any other sentence; Restitution of $500 and $10 Special Assessment.	Kelly received a full pardon on January 20, 2025
April 23, 2021	Kenneth Kelly	Federal: Entering ... in a Restricted Building; Disorderly ... in a Restricted Building; Violent Entry and Disorderly Conduct in a Capitol Building; Parading ... in a Capitol Building	Kelly pleaded Guilty to one charge: Parading ... in a Capitol Building. The other charges are dismissed.	Sentenced 1/14/2022 to 1 year probation with 60 days home detention/location monitoring; restitution of $500; Special Assessment of $10.	Kelly received a full pardon on January 20, 2025
January 18, 2021	Leo Christopher Kelly	Federal: Obstruction of an Official Proceeding; Entering ... in a Restricted Building or Grounds; Disorderly ... in a Restricted Building or Grounds; Entering ... on the Floor of Congress; Entering ... in Certain Rooms in the Capitol Building; Disorderly Conduct in a Capitol Building; Parading ... in a Capitol Building	Kelly pleaded Not Guilty to all charges. In a Jury trial on 5/9/2023, he was found Guilty on all charges.	Sentenced on 8/18/2023 to 30 months of incarceration; 36 months of supervised release; $190 special assessment; $5,000 fine; $2,000 fine. On 9/9/2024, the USCA vacated the Obstruction conviction. Resentenced on 12/10/2024 to time-served; 12 months of supervised release; restitution of $500; $5,000 fine; special assessment of $90.	Kelly received a full pardon on January 20, 2025
May 22, 2024	Thomas Joseph Kelly, Jr.	Federal: Assaulting ... Certain Officers Using a Dangerous Weapon and Inflicting Bodily Injury; Assaulting ... Certain Officers Using a Dangerous Weapon (2 counts); Assaulting ... Certain Officers (2 counts); Civil Disorder; Entering ... in a Restricted Building or Grounds with a Deadly or Dangerous Weapon; Disorderly ... in a Restricted Building or Grounds; Engaging in Physical Violence in a Restricted Building or Grounds; Act of Physical Violence in the Capitol Grounds or Buildings	Kelly was indicted by Grand Jury on 1/8/2025.	On 1/21/2025, the court grants the government's motion to dismiss the case with prejudice.	
May 08, 2024	Christina Katherine Kelso	Federal: Conspiracy to Impede or Injure Officers; Civil Disorder; Entering ... in a Restricted Building or Grounds; Disorderly ... in a Restricted Building or Grounds; Disorderly Conduct in a Capitol Building or Grounds	Kelso pleaded Not Guilty to all charges.	On 1/21/2025, the court grants the government's motion to dismiss the case with prejudice	
September 14, 2023	Christopher H. Keniley	Federal: Entering ... in a Restricted Building or Grounds; Disorderly ... in a Restricted Building or Grounds; Disorderly Conduct in a Capitol Building; Parading ... in a Capitol Building	Keniley pleaded Guilty to two charges: Disorderly Conduct in a Capitol Building; Parading ... in a Capitol Building. The other charges are dismissed.	Sentenced on 7/22/2024 to 10 days incarceration; $20 Special Assessment; 12 months Probation; $500 in Restitution.	Keniley received a full pardon on January 20, 2025
July 28, 2021	Nicholas L. Kennedy	Federal: Civil Disorder; Obstruction of an Official Proceeding; Entering ... in a Restricted Building or Grounds; Disorderly ... in a Restricted Building or Grounds; Disorderly Conduct in a Capitol Building; Parading ... in a Capitol Building; Tampering with Records, Documents, or Objects	Kennedy was found Guilty in a Stipulated Bench Trial held on 4/3/2024 on Obstruction of an Official Proceeding charge; Kennedy pleaded Guilty to two charges: Civil Disorder and Tampering with Records, Documents, or Objects. The court vacated the Obstruction verdict on 10/22/2024 and held a new stipulated bench trial on 10/23/2024.	On 1/21/2025, the court grants the government's motion to dismiss the case with prejudice	
December 21, 2023	Michael Kenny	Federal: Disorderly Conduct in a Capitol Building or Grounds; Parading ... in a Capitol Building	Kenny pleaded Guilty to both charges.	Sentencing set for 1/28/2024. On 1/27/2025, the court grants the government's motion to dismiss the case with prejudice	
December 21, 2023	Thomas Kenny	Federal: Disorderly Conduct in a Capitol Building or Grounds; Parading ... in a Capitol Building	Kenny pleaded Guilty to both charges.	Sentencing set for 1/28/2024. On 1/27/2025, the court grants the government's motion to dismiss the case with prejudice	
March 02, 2023	Jay Matthew Kenyon	Federal: Civil Disorder; Obstruction of an Official Proceeding; Entering ... in a Restricted Building or Grounds; Disorderly ... in a Restricted Building or Grounds; Disorderly Conduct in a Capitol Building; Parading ... in a Capitol Building	Kenyon pleaded Not Guilty to all charges. The court dismisses the Obstruction charge on 9/12/2024. A Bench trial verdict on 10/1/2024 finds him Guilty on all remaining charges.	Sentenced on 1/10/2025 to 15 months of incarceration; 24 months of supervised release; $170 Special Assessment; Restitution of $2,000.	Kenyon received a full pardon on January 20, 2025
December 01, 2021	Josiah Kenyon	Federal: Assaulting ... Certain Officers Using a Dangerous Weapon	Kenyon pleaded Guilty to one charge: Assaulting ... Certain Officers Using a Dangerous Weapon. The other charges are dismissed.	Sentenced on 4/11/2023 to 72 Months Incarceration; 36 Months Of Supervised Release; Special Assessment Of $200; Restitution Of $43,315.25 for damage to a Capitol window.	Kenyon received a full pardon on January 20, 2025
April 05, 2023	Heather Kepley	Federal: Entering ... in a Restricted Building or Grounds; Disorderly ... in a Restricted Building or Grounds	Kepley pleaded Guilty to one charge: Entering ... in a Restricted Building or Grounds. The other charge is dismissed.	Sentenced on 12/1/2023 to 3 Years Probation; 28 days intermittent confinement; 60 days location monitoring; Restitution Of $500; Fine of $1,500; Special Assessment Of $25.	Kepley received a full pardon on January 20, 2025
March 14, 2021	Julian Elie Khater	Federal: Conspiracy to Impede or Injure an Officer; Assault on a Federal Officer with a Dangerous Weapon and Aiding and Abetting; Civil Disorder; Obstruction of an Official Proceeding; Entering ... Restricted Building or Grounds with a Deadly or Dangerous Weapon and Causing Significant Bodily Injury; Disorderly ... Restricted Building or Grounds with a Deadly or Dangerous Weapon and Causing Significant Bodily Injury; Engaging in Physical Violence in a Restricted Building or Grounds with a Deadly or Dangerous Weapon and Causing Significant Bodily Injury: Act of Physical Violence in the Capitol Grounds or Buildings	Guilty — two counts of assaulting, resisting or impeding officers with a dangerous weapon	Sentenced to 80 months in prison with credit for time served.	32-year-old man from Pennsylvania charged in connection with the death of Brian Sicknick. He and another man, who had grown up together in New Jersey, worked together to spray the officers with a toxic chemical that temporarily blinded them. On January 27, 2023, he was sentenced to 80 months.
February 23, 2022	Carol O'Neal Kicinski	Federal: Entering ... in a Restricted Building or Grounds; Disorderly ... in a Restricted Building or Grounds; Disorderly Conduct in a Capitol Building or Grounds; Parading ... in a Capitol Building	Kicinski pleaded Guilty to one charge: Entering ... in a Restricted Building or Grounds. The other charges are dismissed.	Sentenced on 6/23/2023 to 20 Days of incarceration; 1 Year of Supervised Release; Special Assessment of $25; Restitution of $500.	Kicinski received a full pardon on January 20, 2025
June 11, 2021	Nolan Harold Kidd	Federal: Entering ... in a Restricted Building or Grounds; Disorderly ... in a Restricted Building or Grounds; Disorderly Conduct in a Capitol Building; Parading ... in a Capitol Building	Kidd pleaded Guilty to one charge: Parading ... in a Capitol Building. The other charges are dismissed.	Sentenced on 5/9/2022 to 45 days of Incarceration; $10 special assessment and restitution in the amount of $500.	Kidd received a full pardon on January 20, 2025
August 22, 2023	Clive A. Kincaid	Federal: Entering ... in a Restricted Building or Grounds; Disorderly ... in a Restricted Building or Grounds; Disorderly Conduct in a Capitol Building; Parading ... in a Capitol Building.	Kincaid pleaded Guilty to one charge: Entering ... in a Restricted Building or Grounds. The other charges are dismissed.	Sentenced on 8/15/2024 to 12 Months of Probation, 3 Months of which to be served as Home Incarceration; Fine of $876; Restitution of $500; Special Assessment of $25.	Kincaid received a full pardon on January 20, 2025
March 25, 2022	Patrick John King	Federal: Entering ... in a Restricted Building or Grounds; Disorderly ... in a Restricted Building or Grounds; Disorderly Conduct in a Capitol Building; Parading ... in a Capitol Building	King pleaded Guilty to one charge: Parading ... in a Capitol Building. The other charges are dismissed.	Sentenced on 5/9/2023 to 36 months of Probation; 90 days home detention; $10 Special Assessment; Restitution of $500; 60 hours of community service.	King received a full pardon on January 20, 2025
June 10, 2021	Derek Kinnison	Federal: Conspiracy to Obstruct an Official Proceeding; Obstruction of an Official Proceeding and Aiding and Abetting; Entering ... in a Restricted Building and Grounds; Disorderly ... in a Restricted Building or Grounds; Tampering with Documents or Proceedings	Kinnison pleaded Not Guilty to all charges. Found Guilty in a Jury trial on 11/7/2023 on all charges.	Sentenced on 4/19/2024 to 33 months incarceration; 36 month term of supervised release; restitution in the amount of $2,000; special assessment of $350.	Kinnison received a full pardon on January 20, 2025
August 01, 2022	William Stephon Kit	Federal: Entering ... in a Restricted Building or Grounds; Attempted Carrying a Pistol Without a License (Outside Home or Place of Business)	Kit pleaded Guilty to the two charges.	Sentenced on 5/17/2023 to 30 days of incarceration; 12 Months of supervised release; $75 Special Assessment; Restitution of $500; 40 hours of community service.	Kit received a full pardon on January 20, 2025
March 5, 2021	Federico Guillermo Klein	Federal: Assaulting ... Certain Officers and Aiding and Abetting; Assaulting ... Certain Officers Using a Dangerous Weapon; Obstruction of an Official Proceeding and Aiding and Abetting; Civil Disorder; Disorderly ... Restricted Building or Grounds with a Deadly or Dangerous Weapon; Engaging in Physical Violence in a Restricted Building or Grounds with a Deadly or Dangerous Weapon; Disorderly Conduct in a Capitol Building; Act of Physical Violence in the Capitol Grounds or Buildings	Not Guilty – all charges	Guilty	A former U.S. State Department official, appointed during the Trump administration. The first known Trump administration official to be tried in relation to the events of January 6. According to his arrest affidavit, the suspect allegedly fought a line of police officers and used a police-issued riot shield to wedge an entrance open for other rioters.
March 23, 2021	Jonathanpeter Allen Klein	Federal: Civil Disorder; Assaulting ... Certain Officers	Klein pleaded Guilty to both charges.	Sentenced on 12/2/2024 to 9 months incarceration; 36 months of supervised release; $200 special assessment; $3,000 restitution.	Klein received a full pardon on January 20, 2025
March 23, 2021	Matthew Leland Klein	Federal: Conspiracy; Obstruction of an Official Proceeding and Aiding and Abetting; Obstruction of Law Enforcement During Civil Disorder and Aiding and Abetting; Destruction of Government Property and Aiding and Abetting; Entering ... in a Restricted Building or Grounds; Disorderly Conduct in a Restricted Building or Grounds	Klein pleaded Guilty to two charges: Civil Disorder and Entering ... in a Restricted Building or Grounds. The other charges are dismissed.	Sentenced on 11/14/2024 to 90 days incarceration; 36 months supervised release; $125 special assessment; $3,000 restitution.	Klein received a full pardon on January 20, 2025
May 26, 2024	William George Knight	Federal: Civil Disorder; Assaulting ... Certain Officers; Assaulting ... Certain Officers Using a Dangerous Weapon; Entering ... in a Restricted Building or Grounds; Disorderly ... in a Restricted Building or Grounds; Engaging in Physical Violence in a Restricted Building or Grounds; Disorderly Conduct in a Capitol Building; Act of Physical Violence in the Capitol Grounds or Buildings		On 1/31/2025, the court grants the government's motion to dismiss the case with prejudice. Also ordered the bench warrant for the defendant's arrest is quashed	
August 31, 2022	Joshua Knowles	DC; Federal: DC charge: Unlawful Entry (Public Property); Federal charges: Entering ... in any Restricted Building or Grounds; Disorderly ... in a Restricted Building or Grounds; Disorderly or Disruptive Conduct in the Capitol Grounds or Buildings; Parading ... in a Capitol Building	Knowles pleaded Guilty to one federal charge: Disorderly ... in a Restricted Building or Grounds. The other charges are dismissed.	Sentenced on 7/25/2024 to 7 months of Incarceration; 12 months of Supervised Release (with conditions); $25 Special Assessment; Restitution of $500. The DC charge was Dismissed Nolle-Prosequi on 9/7/2022.	Knowles received a full pardon on January 20, 2025
August 14, 2023	James Allen Knowles	Federal: Entering ... in a Restricted Building or Grounds; Disorderly ... in a Restricted Building or Grounds; Disorderly Conduct in a Capitol Building or Grounds; Parading ... in a Capitol Building	Knowles was found Guilty on one charge: Entering ... in a Restricted Building or Grounds; and Not Guilty on charges 2–4.	Sentencing set for 1/24/2025. On 1/22/2025, the court grants the government's motion to dismiss the case with prejudice	
April 07, 2021	Brady Knowlton	Federal: Entering ... in a Restricted Building or Grounds; Disorderly ... in a Restricted Building or Grounds; Disorderly Conduct in a Capitol Building; Parading ... in a Capitol Building; Entering ... in the Gallery of Congress; Obstruction of an Official Proceeding and Aiding and Abetting; Theft of Government Property	Knowlton pleaded Not Guilty to all charges. Found Guilty on two charges in a Stipulated Bench trial on 3/20/2024: Entering ... in a Restricted Building or Grounds; and Obstruction of an Official Proceeding and Aiding and Abetting. On 10/9/2024, the court dismissed the Obstruction charge.	Sentenced on 12/18/2024 to 36 Months of Probation; $75,000 Fine; $25,000 Restitution; $25 Special Assessment.	Knowlton received a full pardon on January 20, 2025
January 12, 2022	Billy Knutson	Federal: Entering ... in a Restricted Building or Grounds; Disorderly ... in a Restricted Building or Grounds; Disorderly Conduct in a Capitol Building; Parading ... in a Capitol Building	Knutson pleaded Guilty to one charge: Entering ... in a Restricted Building or Grounds. The other charges are dismissed.	Sentenced on 8/26/2022 to 6 months of incarceration; 12 months of Supervised Release; Special Assessment of $25; Restitution of $500.	Knutson received a full pardon on January 20, 2025
November 09, 2023	Troy Allen Koen	Federal: Civil Disorder; Assaulting ... Certain Officers; Destruction of Government Property; Entering ... in a Restricted Building or Grounds; Engaging in Physical Violence in a Restricted Building or Grounds; Disorderly Conduct in a Capitol Building; Act of Physical Violence in the Capitol Grounds or Buildings	Koen pleaded Guilty to one charge: Assaulting ... Certain Officers.	Sentencing set for 2/26/2025. On 1/21/2025, the court grants the government's motion to dismiss the case with prejudice.	
April 25, 2024	Matthew Patrick Kohler	Federal: Entering ... in a Restricted Building or Grounds; Disorderly Conduct in a Restricted Building or Grounds; Disorderly Conduct in a Capitol Building; Parading ... in a Capitol Building	Kohler pleaded Guilty to two charges: Disorderly Conduct in a Capitol Building; Parading ... in a Capitol Building. The other charges are dismissed.	Sentenced on 11/15/2024 to 3 Years Probation; Special Assessment of $20; Restitution of $500; Fine of $5,000; 200 hours of community service.	Kohler received a full pardon on January 20, 2025
April 25, 2024	Matthew Patrick Kohler	Federal: Entering ... in a Restricted Building or Grounds; Disorderly Conduct in a Restricted Building or Grounds; Disorderly Conduct in a Capitol Building; Parading ... in a Capitol Building	Kohler pleaded Guilty to two charges: Disorderly Conduct in a Capitol Building; Parading ... in a Capitol Building. The other charges are dismissed.	Sentenced on 11/15/2024 to 3 Years Probation; Special Assessment of $20; Restitution of $500; Fine of $5,000; 200 hours of community service.	Kohler received a full pardon on January 20, 2025
February 11, 2021	Cory Konold	Federal: Conspiracy; Obstruction of an Official Proceeding and Aiding and Abetting; Obstruction of Law Enforcement During Civil Disorder and Aiding and Abetting; Entering ... in a Restricted Building or Grounds	Konold pleaded Guilty to one charge: Obstruction of Law Enforcement During Civil Disorder and Aiding and Abetting. The other charges are dismissed.	Sentenced on 1/24/2024 to 30 days of Incarceration; 24 months of Supervised Release (with conditions); $100 Special Assessment; Restitution of $2,000.	Konold received a full pardon on January 20, 2025
February 11, 2021	Felicia Konold	Federal: Conspiracy; Obstruction of an Official Proceeding and Aiding and Abetting; Obstruction of Law Enforcement During Civil Disorder and Aiding and Abetting; Entering ... in a Restricted Building or Grounds	Konold pleaded Guilty to one charge: Obstruction of Law Enforcement During Civil Disorder and Aiding and Abetting. The other charges are dismissed.	Sentenced on 1/24/2024 to 45 days of Incarceration; 90 days location monitoring; 24 months of Supervised Release; $100 Special Assessment; Restitution of $2,000.	Konold received a full pardon on January 20, 2025
May 20, 2022	Brian Korte	Federal: Entering ... in a Restricted Building or Grounds; Disorderly ... in a Restricted Building or Grounds; Disorderly Conduct in a Capitol Building or Grounds; Parading ... in a Capitol Building	Korte pleaded Guilty to one charge: Parading ... in a Capitol Building. The other charges are dismissed.	Sentenced on 7/12/2023 to 21 days of incarceration; restitution of $500; special assessment of $10.	Korte received a full pardon on January 20, 2025
February 26, 2021	Jackson Kostolsky	Federal: Entering ... in a Restricted Building; Disorderly ... in a Restricted Building; Violent Entry and Disorderly Conduct; Parading ... in a Capitol Building	Kostolsky pleaded Guilty to one charge: Parading ... in a Capitol Building. The other charges are dismissed.	Sentenced 1/11/2022 to 3 years probation; 30 days location monitoring/home detention; $10 special assessment; and $500 restitution.	Kostolsky received a full pardon on January 20, 2025
June 19, 2022	Paul Edward Kovacik	Federal: Entering ... in a Restricted Building or Grounds; Disorderly ... in a Restricted Building or Grounds; Disorderly Conduct in a Capitol Building; Parading ... in a Capitol Building	Kovacik pleaded Guilty to one charge: Parading ... in a Capitol Building. The other charges are dismissed. Sentenced on 6/21/2023 to 90 Days of incarceration; 3 Years of Probation; Special Assessment of $10; Restitution of $500. Failed to appear to serve sentence after fleeing the country; arrested 6/20/2024 in St. Paul, Minn. upon his return; charged with Failure to Appear on 7/26/2024. Pleaded Guilty to Failure to Appear.	Sentenced on 12/10/2024 to 120 Days of Incarceration with credit for time served; 1 Year of Supervised Release; Special Assessment of $25.	Kovacik received a full pardon on January 20, 2025
December 21, 2023	Adam Kovsky	Federal: Entering ... in a Restricted Building or Grounds	Kovsky pleaded Guilty to the single charge.	Sentenced on 7/22/2024 to 36 Months probation; Special assessment of $25; Restitution of $500; 100 hours of community service.	Kovsky received a full pardon on January 20, 2025
November 07, 2024	Emil Kozeluh	Federal: Entering ... in a Restricted Building or Grounds; Disorderly ... in a Restricted Building or Grounds; Disorderly Conduct in a Capitol Building or Grounds; Parading ... in a Capitol Building; Civil Disorder		On 1/24/2025, the court grants the government's motion to dismiss the case with prejudice	
April 14, 2021	Philip Edward Kramer	Federal: Entering ... in a Restricted Building with a Dangerous Weapon; Disorderly ... in a Restricted Building; Violent Entry and Disorderly Conduct in a Capitol Building; Parading ... in a Capitol Building; Theft of Government Property	Kramer pleaded Guilty to one charge: Parading ... in a Capitol Building. The other charges are dismissed.	Sentenced on 5/12/2022 to 30 days incarceration; $2,500 fine; $500 restitution; $10 special assessment; 100 hours community service.	Kramer received a full pardon on January 20, 2025
November 15, 2022	David Krauss	Federal: Entering ... in a Restricted Building or Grounds; Disorderly ... in a Restricted Building or Grounds; Disorderly Conduct on Capitol Grounds; Parading ... in Capitol Building	Krauss pleaded Guilty to one charge: Parading ... in Capitol Building. The other charges are dismissed.	Sentenced on 9/15/2023 to 9 months of Probation; $1,000 fine; $500 restitution; $10 special assessment; 60 hours of community service.	Krauss received a full pardon on January 20, 2025
November 15, 2022	Nicholas Krauss	Federal: Entering ... in a Restricted Building or Grounds; Disorderly ... in a Restricted Building or Grounds; Disorderly Conduct on Capitol Grounds; Parading ... in Capitol Building	Krauss pleaded Guilty to one charge: Parading ... in Capitol Building. The other charges are dismissed.	Sentenced on 9/15/2023 to 9 months of Probation; $1,000 fine; $500 in restitution; $10 special assessment; 60 hours of community service.	Krauss received a full pardon on January 20, 2025
December 15, 2022	Peter Michael Krill, Jr.	Federal: Civil Disorder	Krill pleaded Guilty to the charge.	Sentenced on 2/9/2024 to 9 months incarceration; 1 year term of supervised release; $100 special assessment; $2,000 in restitution.	Krill received a full pardon on January 20, 2025
February 23, 2022	Matthew Thomas Krol	Federal: Civil Disorder; Assaulting ... Certain Officers; Assaulting ... Certain Officers Using a Dangerous Weapon (2 counts); Robbery; Entering ... in a Restricted Building or Grounds with a Deadly or Dangerous Weapon; Engaging in Physical Violence in a Restricted Building or Grounds with a Deadly or Dangerous Weapon; Act of Physical Violence in the Capitol Grounds or Buildings	Krol pleaded Guilty to one charge: Assaulting ... Certain Officers Using a Dangerous Weapon. The other charges are dismissed.	Sentenced on 12/15/2023 to 51 months in prison (with credit for time served); 36 months of supervised release; $2,000 in restitution; Special Assessment: $100.	Krol received a full pardon on January 20, 2025
September 14, 2021	Carla Krzywicki	Federal: Entering or Remaining in a Restricted Building or Grounds; Disorderly ... in a Restricted Building or Grounds; Disorderly Conduct in a Capitol Building; Parading ... in a Capitol Building	Krzywicki pleaded Guilty to one charge: Parading ... in a Capitol Building. The other charges are dismissed.	Sentenced on 4/22/2022 to 36 months of probation with 90 days home detention; a special assessment of $10, and restitution of $500.	Krzywicki received a full pardon on January 20, 2025
October 27, 2022	Deborah Anne Kuecken	Federal: Entering ... in a Restricted Building; Disorderly ... in a Restricted Building; Violent Entry and Disorderly Conduct in a Capitol Building; Parading ... in a Capitol Building	Kuecken pleaded Guilty to one charge: Parading ... in a Capitol Building. The other charges are dismissed.	Sentenced on 6/9/2023 to 36 months of Probation; 30 days of location monitoring; $500 in restitution; $10 special assessment; 60 hours of community service.	Kuecken received a full pardon on January 20, 2025
February 11, 2021	Christopher Kuehne	Federal: Conspiracy; Obstruction of an Official Proceeding and Aiding and Abetting; Obstruction of Law Enforcement During Civil Disorder and Aiding and Abetting; Entering ... in a Restricted Building or Grounds	Kuehne pleaded Guilty to one charge: Obstruction of Law Enforcement During Civil Disorder. The other charges are dismissed.	Sentenced on 2/23/2024 to 75 days of Incarceration; 24 months of Supervised Release; 60 days location monitoring; $100 Special Assessment; Restitution of $2,000.	Kuehne received a full pardon on January 20, 2025
June 08, 2021	Christian Kulas	Federal: Entering ... in a Restricted Building or Grounds; Disorderly Conduct in a Capitol Building; Parading ... in a Capitol Building	Kulas pleaded Guilty to one charge: Parading ... in a Capitol Building. The other charges are dismissed.	Sentenced on 4/26/2022 to 6 months of Probation; 60 days home detention; Special Assessment of $10; Restitution of $500.	Kulas received a full pardon on January 20, 2025
November 19, 2021	Mark Kulas Jr.	Federal: Parading ... in a Capitol Building	Kulas pleaded Guilty to the charge.	Sentenced on 4/26/2022 to 6 months of Probation; 60 days home detention; Special Assessment of $10; Restitution of $500.	Kulas received a full pardon on January 20, 2025
June 28, 2023	Kyle Kumer	Federal: Civil Disorder; Entering ... in a Restricted Building or Grounds; Disorderly ... in a Restricted Building or Grounds; Impeding Passage Through the Capitol Grounds or Buildings	Kumer pleaded Guilty to one charge: Civil Disorder. The other charges are dismissed.	Sentenced on 7/9/2024 to 10 months incarceration; 24 months of supervised release; $2,000 in restitution; $100 special assessment; 50 hours of community service.	Kumer received a full pardon on January 20, 2025
March 07, 2024	David Scott Kuntz	Federal: Conspiracy to Impede or Injure Officers; Entering ... in a Restricted Building or Grounds; Disorderly ... in a Restricted Building or Grounds; Disorderly Conduct in a Capitol Building	Kuntz pleaded Guilty to one charge: Conspiracy to Impede or Injure Officers.	Sentencing set for 4/1/2025. On 1/21/2025, the court grants the government's motion to dismiss the case with prejudice.	
July 29, 2024	Dianelle Lacy	Federal: Entering ... in a Restricted Building or Grounds; Disorderly ... in a Restricted Building or Grounds; Disorderly Conduct in a Capitol Building or Grounds; Parading ... in a Capitol Building	Lacy pleaded Not Guilty to all charges.	On 1/23/2025, the court grants the government's motion to dismiss the case with prejudice	
April 18, 2023	Tricia LaCount	Federal: Entering ... in a Restricted Building or Grounds; Disorderly or Disruptive Conduct in a Restricted Building or Grounds; Disorderly Conduct in a Capitol Building; Parading ... in a Capitol Building	LaCount pleaded Guilty to one charge: Entering and Remaining in a Restricted Building or Grounds.	The other charges are dismissed. Sentenced on 11/26/2024 to 36 Months of Probation; Special Assessment of $25; Restitution of $500.	LaCount received a full pardon on January 20, 2025
January 17, 2024	Justin LaGesse	Federal: Destruction of Government Property; Entering ... in a Restricted Building or Grounds; Disorderly ... in a Restricted Building or Grounds; Engaging in Physical Violence in a Restricted Building Grounds; Disorderly Conduct in a Capitol Building; Act of Physical Violence in the Capitol Grounds or Buildings; Parading, Picketing, and Demonstrating in a Capitol Building	LaGesse pleaded Guilty to one charge: Destruction of Government Property. The other charges are dismissed.	Sentenced on 1/10/2025 to 11 months incarceration; 12 months of Supervised Release; $100 Special Assessment; Restitution of $43,315.	LaGesse received a full pardon on January 20, 2025
March 24, 2022	John Franklin Lammons	Federal: Entering ... in a Restricted Building or Grounds; Disorderly ... in a Restricted Building or Grounds; Disorderly Conduct in a Capitol Building; Parading ... in a Capitol Building	Lammons pleaded Guilty to one charge: Parading ... in a Capitol Building. The other charges are dismissed.	Sentenced on 2/6/2023 to 30 days incarceration; 36 months probation; $10 special assessment; $500 restitution.	Lammons received a full pardon on January 20, 2025
August 16, 2022	Antonio Lamotta	Federal: Civil Disorder; Entering ... in a Restricted Building or Grounds; Disorderly ... in a Restricted Building or Grounds; Disorderly Conduct in a Capitol Building or Grounds; Parading ... in a Capitol Building	Lamotta pleaded Not Guilty to all charges. Found Guilty on three charges: Civil Disorder; Disorderly Conduct in a Capitol Building or Grounds; Parading ... in a Capitol Building. The other charges are dismissed.	Sentenced on 9/11/2024 to 6 months of Incarceration; 24 months of Supervised Release; Special Assessment of $120; Restitution of $2,000; 30 hours of community service.	Lamotta received a full pardon on January 20, 2025
January 16, 2021	Edward Jacob Lang	Federal: Assaulting ... Certain Officers and Aiding and Abetting (5 counts); Assaulting ... Certain Officers Using a Dangerous Weapon (2 counts); Assaulting ... Certain Officers Using a Dangerous Weapon, Inflicting Bodily Injury; Civil Disorder; Disorderly ... in a Restricted Building or Grounds with a Deadly or Dangerous Weapon; Engaging in Physical Violence in a Restricted Building or Grounds with a Deadly or Dangerous Weapon; Disorderly Conduct in a Capitol Building; Act of Physical Violence in the Capitol Grounds or Buildings	Lang pleaded Not Guilty to all charges.	On 1/21/2025, the court grants the government's motion to dismiss the case with prejudice.	On January 17, 2026, Lang tried to lead a "March Against Minnesota Fraud" in which he vowed to burn a Quran and march through a neighborhood with a large Somali-American population. He and his small band of supporters were surrounded by a much larger set of counter-demonstrators, and Lang abandoned his plans. Lang was subsequently arrested on February 5, 2026 on suspicion of criminal damage to property charges after he posted a video of himself tearing down an anti-ICE ice sculpture installed by a veterans group on the Minnesota state capitol grounds. He has pleaded not guilty in that case. Lang was charged again on March 2, 2026, in connection with threats he allegedly made to Metropolitan Police Cmdr. Jason Bagshaw during a Capitol attack anniversary event.
April 15, 2021	Nicholas John Languerand	Federal: Civil Disorder; Assaulting ... Certain Officers Using a Dangerous Weapon; Entering ... in a Restricted Building or Grounds with a Deadly or Dangerous Weapon; Disorderly ... in a Restricted Building or Grounds with a Deadly or Dangerous Weapon; Engaging in Physical Violence in a Restricted Building or Grounds with a Deadly or Dangerous Weapon; Disorderly Conduct in a Capitol Building; Act of Physical Violence in the Capitol Grounds or Buildings	Languerand pleaded Guilty to one charge: Assaulting ... Certain Officers Using a Dangerous Weapon. The other charges are dismissed.	Sentenced 1/26/2022 to 44 months incarceration with credit for time served since April 15, 2021; 24 months of supervised release; special assessment of $100; restitution of $2,000; 60 hours of community service.	Languerand received a full pardon on January 20, 2025
March 12, 2024	Joseph Julius Lapoint	Federal: Entering ... in a Restricted Building or Grounds; Disorderly ... in a Restricted Building or Grounds; Disorderly Conduct in a Capitol Building; Parading ... in a Capitol Building	Lapoint pleaded Guilty to two charges: Disorderly Conduct in a Capitol Building; Parading ... in a Capitol Building. The other charges are dismissed.	Sentenced on 10/16/2024 to 19 days incarceration; 12 months Probation; $20 Special Assessment; Restitution of $500; 80 hours of community service.	Lapoint received a full pardon on January 20, 2025
March 26, 2021	Benjamin Larocca	Federal: Obstruction of an Official Proceeding; Entering ... in a Restricted Building or Grounds; Disorderly ... in a Restricted Building or Grounds; Disorderly Conduct in a Capitol Building; Parading ... in a Capitol Building	Larocca pleaded Guilty to one charge, amended on 8/10/2022: Disorderly ... in a Restricted Building or Grounds. The other charges are dismissed.	Sentenced 8/10/2022 to 60 days of incarceration; 12 months of Supervised Release; Special assessment of $25; fine of $2,000; Restitution of $500; 60 hours of community service.	Larocca received a full pardon on January 20, 2025
January 11, 2022	Nicholas John Lattanzi	Federal: Entering ... in a Restricted Building or Grounds; Disorderly ... in a Restricted Building or Grounds; Disorderly Conduct in a Capitol Building; Parading ... in a Capitol Building	Lattanzi pleaded Guilty to one charge: Parading ... in a Capitol Building. The other charges are dismissed.	Sentenced on 12/9/2022 to 14 days of incarceration; Special Assessment of $10; Restitution of $500; Fine $500.	Lattanzi received a full pardon on January 20, 2025
June 30, 2021	Jonathan Davis Laurens	Federal: Entering or Remaining in any Restricted Building or Grounds Without Lawful Authority; Disorderly ... in a Restricted Building; Entering ... on the Floor of Congress; Violent Entry and Disorderly Conduct in a Capitol Building; Parading ... in a Capitol Building	Laurens pleaded Guilty to one charge: Parading ... in a Capitol Building. The other charges are dismissed.	Sentenced on 6/10/2022 to 60 days of home detention, 12 months of probation, 60 hours of community service, $742 fine, $500 in restitution, $10 special assessment.	Laurens received a full pardon on January 20, 2025
September 14, 2021	Jean Lavin	Federal: Entering or Remaining in a Restricted Building or Grounds; Disorderly ... in a Restricted Building or Grounds; Disorderly Conduct in a Capitol Building; Parading ... in a Capitol Building	Lavin pleaded Guilty to one charge: Parading ... in a Capitol Building. The other charges are dismissed.	Sentenced on 4/22/2022 to 36 months of probation with 10 days intermittent confinement and 60 days home detention; a special assessment of $10, a fine of $2,500, and restitution of $500.	Lavin received a full pardon on January 20, 2025
December 19, 2022	Rebecca Lavrenz	Federal: Entering ... in a Restricted Building or Grounds; Disorderly ... in a Restricted Building or Grounds; Disorderly Conduct in a Capitol Building; Parading ... in a Capitol Building	Lavrenz pleaded Not Guilty to all charges. Found Guilty on all charges in a Jury trial on 4/4/2024.	Sentenced on 8/12/2024 to 12 months probation; $500 restitution; fine of $103,000; special assessment of $70; 180 days of location monitoring.	Lavrenz received a full pardon on January 20, 2025
July 26, 2021	Samuel Lazar	Federal: Assaulting ... Certain Officers Using a Dangerous Weapon	Lazar pleaded Guilty to the charge.	Sentenced on 3/17/2023 to 30 months incarceration; 36 months of supervised release; Special Assessment of $100; Restitution of $2,000.	Lazar received a full pardon on January 20, 2025
May 28, 2021	Kene Brian Lazo	Federal: Entering ... in a Restricted Building; Disorderly ... in a Restricted Building; Violent Entry and Disorderly Conduct in a Capitol Building; Parading ... in a Capitol Building	Lazo pleaded Guilty to one charge: Parading ... in a Capitol Building. The other charges are dismissed.	Sentenced on 8/18/2022 45 days Incarceration; Special Assessment $10; Restitution $500.	Lazo received a full pardon on January 20, 2025
September 08, 2023	Nhi Ngoc Mai Le	Federal: Entering or Remaining in a Restricted Building or Grounds; Disorderly ... in a Restricted Building or Grounds; Disorderly Conduct in a Capitol Building or Grounds; Parading ... in a Capitol Building	Le pleaded Guilty to two charges: Disorderly Conduct in a Capitol Building or Grounds; and Parading ... in a Capitol Building. The other charges are dismissed.	Sentenced on 2/26/2024 to 10 days incarceration; Fine of $1000; Restitution of $500; Special assessment of $20.	Le received a full pardon on January 20, 2025
April 13, 2022	Matthew LeBrun	Federal: Entering ... in a Restricted Building or Grounds; Disorderly ... in a Restricted Building; Disorderly Conduct in a Capitol Building; Parading ... in a Capitol Building	LeBrun pleaded Guilty to one charge: Entering ... in a Restricted Building or Grounds. The other charges are dismissed.	Sentenced on 1/23/2024 to 24 months of Probation; 60 days location monitoring; 40 hours of community service; Special Assessment of $25; Restitution in the amount of $500.	LeBrun received a full pardon on January 20, 2025
August 12, 2021	Deborah Lynn Lee	Federal: Obstruction of an Official Proceeding; Entering ... in a Restricted Building or Grounds; Disorderly ... in a Restricted Building or Grounds; Disorderly Conduct in a Capitol Building; Parading ... in a Capitol Building	Lee pleaded Not Guilty to all charges. On 8/2/2024, the court granted the motion to dismiss Count 1, Obstruction. Found Guilty on all charges on 10/11/2024.	Sentencing set for 1/27/2025. On 1/21/2025, the court grants the government's motion to dismiss the case with prejudice.	
October 19, 2023	Justin Lee	Federal: Civil Disorder; Assaulting ... Certain Officers; Entering ... in a Restricted Building or Grounds; Disorderly ... in a Restricted Building or Grounds; Engaging in Physical Violence in a Restricted Building or Grounds; Disorderly Conduct in a Capitol Building; Act of Physical Violence in the Capitol Grounds or Buildings	Lee pleaded Not Guilty to all charges. Found Guilty on five charges in a Bench trial on 8/23/2024. Found Not Guilty on two charges: Engaging in Physical Violence in a Restricted Building or Grounds; Act of Physical Violence in the Capitol Grounds or Buildings.	Sentenced on 11/22/2024 to 18 months incarceration; one year of supervised release; $7,500 fine; Special Assessment of $260.	Lee received a full pardon on January 20, 2025
January 07, 2021	Mark Jefferson Leffingwell	Federal: Civil Disorder; Assaulting ... Certain Officers or Employees; Entering ... in a Restricted Building; Disorderly ... in a Restricted Building; Violent Entry and Disorderly Conduct in a Capitol Building; Act of Physical Violence in the Capitol Building	Leffingwell pleaded Guilty to one charge: Assaulting ... Certain Officers or Employees. The other charges are dismissed.	Sentenced 2/10/2022 to 6 months incarceration; 2 years supervised release; 200 hours community service; $2,000 restitution; $100 special assessment.	Leffingwell received a full pardon on January 20, 2025
January 30, 2023	Christina Legros	Federal: Entering ... in an Restricted Building or Grounds; Disorderly or Disruptive Conduct in a Restricted Building or Grounds; Disorderly Conduct in a Capitol Building; Parading ... in a Capitol Building	Legros pleaded Guilty to one charge: Entering ... in an Restricted Building or Grounds. The other charges are dismissed.	Sentenced on 5/9/2024 to Time Served; 6 months Supervised Release; $25 Special Assessment; $500 Restitution.	Legros received a full pardon on January 20, 2025
February 19, 2021	Nicholes John Lentz	Federal: Entering ... in a Restricted Building	Lentz pleaded Guilty to the single charge.	Sentenced on 5/10/2022 to 36 months probation; 30 days location monitoring; 100 hours of community service; $500 restitution; $25 special assessment.	Lentz received a full pardon on January 20, 2025
June 24, 2021	David John Lesperance	Federal: Entering ... in a Restricted Building; Disorderly ... in a Restricted Building; Violent Entry and Disorderly Conduct in a Capitol Building; Parading ... in a Capitol Building	Lesperance pleaded Not Guilty to all charges. Found Guilty on all charges in a Jury trial on 7/14/2023.	Sentenced on 10/12/2023 to 10 days of incarceration; 12 months of supervised release; 24 months of probation; Special assessment of $70; Fine of $3,000; Restitution of $500; 50 hours of community service.	Lesperance received a full pardon on January 20, 2025
January 27, 2021	Jacob Lewis	Federal: Entering ... in a Restricted Building; Disorderly ... in a Restricted Building; Violent Entry and Disorderly Conduct in a Capitol Building; Parading ... in a Capitol Building	Lewis pleaded Guilty to one charge: Parading ... in a Capitol Building. The other charges are dismissed.	Sentenced 4/14/2022 to 24 months probation; $3,000 fine; $500 restitution; $10 special assessment; 60 hours of community service.	Lewis received a full pardon on January 20, 2025
November 09, 2023	William Lewis	Federal: Assaulting ... Certain Officers	Lewis pleaded Guilty to the charge.	Sentenced on 1/17/2025 to 37 Months of Incarceration; 24 months of supervised release with conditions; Special Assessment: $100; Restitution: $3,761.	Lewis received a full pardon on January 20, 2025
August 23, 2022	Daniel Leyden	Federal: Assaulting ... Certain Officers Using a Dangerous Weapon; Aiding and Abetting; Obstruction of Law Enforcement During Civil Disorder; Entering ... in a Restricted Building or Grounds; Entering ... in a Restricted Building or Grounds; Engaging in Physical Violence in a Restricted Building or Grounds; Act of Physical Violence in the Capitol Grounds or Buildings	Leyden pleaded Guilty to one charge: Assaulting ... Certain Officers Using a Dangerous Weapon. The other charges are dismissed.	Sentenced on 9/6/2023 to 38 Months of Incarceration; 12 Months of Supervised Release; Special Assessment of $100; Restitution of $2,000.	Leyden received a full pardon on January 20, 2025
August 23, 2022	Joseph Leyden	Federal: Assaulting ... Certain Officers and Aiding and Abetting; Civil Disorder; Entering ... in a Restricted Building or Grounds; Disorderly ... in a Restricted building or Grounds; Engaging in Physical Violence in a Restricted Building or Grounds; Act of Physical Violence in the Capitol Grounds or Buildings	Leyden pleaded Guilty to one charge: Assaulting ... Certain Officers and Aiding and Abetting. The other charges are dismissed.	Sentenced on 9/6/2023 to 6 Months of Incarceration; 12 Months of Supervised Release; Special Assessment of $100; restitution of $2,000; 40 hours of community service.	Leyden received a full pardon on January 20, 2025
July 25, 2023	Anna Lichnowski	Federal: Entering ... in a Restricted Building or Grounds; Disorderly ... in a Restricted Building or Grounds; Disorderly Conduct in a Capitol Building or Grounds; Parading ... in a Capitol Building	Lichnowski pleaded Not Guilty to all charges. Found Guilty in a Bench trial on 7/10/2024 on all charges.	Sentenced on 11/8/2024 to 45 days incarceration; 3 years supervised release; 200 hours of community service; $2,500 fine; $500 in restitution; 3 years of probation; $70 Special Assessment.	Lichnowski received a full pardon on January 20, 2025
December 01, 2021	Lawrence Ligas	Federal: Obstruction of an Official Proceeding; Civil Disorder; Entering ... in a Restricted Building or Grounds; Disorderly ... in a Restricted Building or Grounds; Disorderly Conduct in a Capitol Building; Parading ... in a Capitol Building	Ligas pleaded Not Guilty to all charges.	On 1/21/2025, the court grants the government's motion to dismiss the case with prejudice	
March 07, 2024	Lance Michael Ligocki	Federal: Civil Disorder; Assaulting ... Certain Officers Using a Dangerous Weapon; Entering ... in a Restricted Building or Grounds with a Deadly or Dangerous Weapon; Disorderly ... in a Restricted Building or Grounds with a Deadly or Dangerous Weapon; Engaging in Physical Violence in a Restricted Building or Grounds with a Deadly or Dangerous Weapon; Disorderly Conduct in the Capitol Building or Grounds; Acts of Physical Violence in the Capitol Grounds or Buildings	Ligocki pleaded Not Guilty to all charges.	Jury trial set for 4/28/2025. On 1/22/2025, the court grants the government's motion to dismiss the case with prejudice.	
July 28, 2024	Kennedy Lindsey	Federal: Entering ... in a Restricted Building or Grounds with a Deadly or Dangerous Weapon; Disorderly ... in a Restricted Building or Grounds with a Deadly or Dangerous Weapon; Unlawful Possession of a Dangerous Weapon on Capitol Grounds or Buildings; Disorderly Conduct in a Capitol Building; Parading ... in a Capitol Building	Lindsey pleaded Not Guilty to all charges.	On 1/23/2025, the court grants the government's motion to dismiss the case with prejudice	
February 17, 2021	Terry Lynn Lindsey	Federal: Entering ... in a Restricted Building; Disorderly ... in a Restricted Building; Violent Entry and Disorderly Conduct in a Capitol Building; Parading ... in a Capitol Building	Lindsey pleaded Guilty to three charges: Entering ... in a Restricted Building; Violent Entry and Disorderly Conduct in a Capitol Building; and Parading ... in a Capitol Building. The other charge was dismissed.	Sentenced on 7/15/2022 to 5 months incarceration; 3 years probation; 60 hours of community service; $500 restitution; $45 special assessment.	Lindsey received a full pardon on January 20, 2025
June 30, 2022	Luke Michael Lints	Federal: Civil Disorder; Entering ... in a Restricted Building or Grounds with a Deadly or Dangerous Weapon; Disorderly ... in a Restricted Building or Grounds with a Deadly or Dangerous Weapon; Engaging in Physical Violence in a Restricted Building or Grounds with a Deadly or Dangerous Weapon; Impeding Passage Through the Capitol Grounds or Buildings; Act of Physical Violence in the Capitol Grounds or Buildings	Lints pleaded Guilty to one charge: Civil Disorder. The other charges are dismissed.	Sentenced on 5/26/2023 to 4 Months of Incarceration; 36 Months of Supervised Release; 4 Months of location monitoring; Special Assessment of $100; restitution of $2,000.	Lints received a full pardon on January 20, 2025
March 24, 2021	James Little	Federal: Entering ... in a Restricted Building; Disorderly ... in a Restricted Building; Disorderly ... in a Capitol Building or Grounds; Parading ... in a Capitol Building	Little pleaded Guilty to one charge: Parading, Demonstrating, and Picketing in a Capitol Building. The other charges are dismissed.	Sentenced 3/14/2022 to 60 days incarceration; 36 months of Probation; $10 special assessment; $500 restitution. Upon appeal, as of 8/18/2023, Little's sentence is vacated and remanded to the District court for resentencing. Resentenced on 1/25/2024 to 120 days with 60 days credit for time served; $10 special assessment; restitution of $500.	Little received a full pardon on January 20, 2025
October 29, 2021	Jia Liu	Federal: Entering ... in a Restricted Building or Grounds; Disorderly ... in a Restricted Building or Grounds; Disorderly Conduct in a Capitol Building; Parading ... in a Capitol Building	Liu pleaded Guilty to one charge: Entering ... in a Restricted Building or Grounds. The other charges are dismissed.	Sentenced on 6/15/2023 to 4 months incarceration; 12 months of supervised release; special assessment of $25; restitution of $500.	Liu received a full pardon on January 20, 2025
January 19, 2024	John Michael Livingston	Federal: Obstruction of an Official Proceeding; Entering ... in a Restricted Building or Grounds; Disorderly ... in a Restricted Building or Grounds; Disorderly Conduct in a Capitol Building or Grounds; Parading ... in a Capitol Building	Livingston pleaded Guilty to two charges: Entering ... in a Restricted Building or Grounds; Disorderly ... in a Restricted Building or Grounds. The other charges are dismissed.	Sentenced on 12/10/2024 to 3 years of probation; 70 days of intermittent confinement to be served in 14 day intervals; $500 restitution; $50 special assessment.	Livingston received a full pardon on January 20, 2025
September 15, 2022	Jon Lizak	Federal: Parading ... in a Capitol Building	Lizak pleaded Guilty to the charge.	Sentenced on 10/13/2023 to 36 Months Probation; Special Assessment of $10; Restitution of $500; 3 days intermittent confinement; 50 hours of community service.	Lizak received a full pardon on January 20, 2025
November 30, 2022	Saul Llamas	Federal: Entering ... in a Restricted Building or Grounds; Disorderly ... in a Restricted Building or Grounds; Disorderly Conduct in the Capitol Grounds or Buildings; Parading ... in a Capitol Building	Llamas pleaded Guilty to one charge: Parading ... in a Capitol Building. The other charges are dismissed.	Sentenced on 9/11/2023 to 18 Months of Probation; 120 hours of community service; Special Assessment of $10; Restitution of $500; Fine of $2,500.	Llamas received a full pardon on January 20, 2025
January 04, 2024	Leonard Lobianco	Federal: Civil Disorder; Entering ... in a Restricted Building or Grounds; Disorderly ... in a Restricted Building or Grounds; Disorderly Conduct in a Capitol Building; Parading ... in a Capitol Building	Lobianco pleaded Guilty to one charge: Civil Disorder.	Sentencing set for 1/28/2025. On 1/21/2025, the court grants the government's motion to dismiss the case with prejudice.	
December 15, 2022	Michael Scott Lockwood	Federal: Civil Disorder; Assaulting ... Certain Officers; Theft of Property Within Special and Maritime Jurisdiction; Entering ... in a Restricted Building or Grounds; Disorderly ... in a Restricted Building or Grounds; Engaging in Physical Violence in a Restricted Building or Grounds; Act or Physical Violence in the Capitol Grounds or Buildings	Lockwood pleaded Guilty to one charge: Assaulting ... Certain Officers. The other charges are dismissed.	Sentenced on 11/6/2023 to 12 months and one day incarceration; 36 months of supervised release; $100 special assessment; $2,000 restitution; 40 hours of community service.	Lockwood received a full pardon on January 20, 2025
December 03, 2021	Ronald Loehrke	Federal: Obstruction of Law Enforcement During a Civil Disorder; Unlawful Entry on Restricted Buildings or Grounds; Violent Entry and Disorderly Conduct on Capitol Grounds			On 1/21/2025, the court grants the government's motion to dismiss the case with prejudice
January 15, 2021	Kevin Daniel Loftus	Federal: Entering ... in a Restricted Building; Disorderly ... in a Restricted Building; Violent Entry and Disorderly Conduct in a Capitol Building; Parading ... in a Capitol Building	Loftus pleaded Guilty to Parading ... in a Capitol Building. The remaining charges were dismissed.	Sentenced 3/15/22 to three years of probation; 60 hours of community service; $500 restitution; $10 special assessment. Arrested 10/31/2024 in Iowa for probation violation and resentenced on 12/13/2024: court revokes probation and sentences him to 6 months of incarceration.	Loftus received a full pardon on January 20, 2025
March 29, 2021	Matthew Eugene Loganbill	Federal: Obstruction of an Official Proceeding; Entering ... in a Restricted Building or Grounds; Disorderly ... in a Restricted Building or Grounds; Disorderly Conduct in a Capitol Building; Parading ... in a Capitol Building	Loganbill pleaded Not Guilty to all charges. The court granted his case dismissed without prejudice on 8/16/2023 for violation of his right to a speedy trial. The same charges were refiled 8/23/2023 and he pleaded Not Guilty on 9/14/2023. In a Bench trial verdict on 11/16/2023, he was found Guilty on all charges. On 10/31/2024, the court vacated the Obstruction conviction.	On 1/23/2025, the court dismissed Count One with prejudice and the remainder of the counts without prejudice	
January 27, 2022	Christopher Logsdon	Federal: Entering ... in a Restricted Building or Grounds; Disorderly ... in a Restricted Building or Grounds; Disorderly Conduct in a Capitol Building; Parading ... in a Capitol Building	Logsdon pleaded Guilty to one charge: Parading ... in a Capitol Building. The other charges are dismissed.	Sentenced 10/28/2022 to 36 months of probation, including 14 days of intermittent confinement, $500 restitution; $10 special assessment.	Logsdon received a full pardon on January 20, 2025
January 27, 2022	Tina Logsdon	Federal: Entering ... in a Restricted Building or Grounds; Disorderly ... in a Restricted Building or Grounds; Disorderly Conduct in a Capitol Building; Parading ... in a Capitol Building	Logsdon pleaded Guilty to one charge: Parading ... in a Capitol Building. The other charges are dismissed.	Sentenced 10/28/2022 to 36 months of probation, including 14 days of intermittent confinement, 60 hours of community service, $500 restitution; $10 special assessment.	Logsdon received a full pardon on January 20, 2025
January 15, 2021	Joshua R. Lollar	Federal: Assaulting ... Certain Officers; Civil Disorder; Obstruction of an Official Proceeding, Aiding and Abetting; Entering or Remaining in any Restricted Building or Grounds; Disorderly ... in a Restricted Building or Grounds; Disorderly Conduct in a Capitol Building; Parading ... in a Capitol Building	Lollar pleaded Guilty to one charge: Obstruction of an Official Proceeding. The other charges are dismissed.	Sentenced on 5/22/2023 to 30 months of incarceration with credit for time served; 12 months of supervised release; $100 special assessment; Restitution of $2,000. Lollar received a full pardon on January 20, 2025	
September 08, 2021	James Douglas Lollis, Jr.	Federal: Parading ... in a Capitol Building	Lollis pleaded Guilty to the charge.	Sentenced 2/18/2022 to 36 months probation with 90 days of home detention/location monitoring; $10.00 special assessment and $500.00 restitution; 100 hours of community service.	Lollis received a full pardon on January 20, 2025
January 09, 2021	John Lolos	Federal: Entering ... in a Restricted Building or Grounds; Disorderly ... in a Restricted Building or Grounds; Disorderly Conduct in a Capitol Building; Parading ... in a Capitol Building	Lolos pleaded Guilty to one charge: Parading ... in a Capitol Building. The other charges were dismissed.	Sentenced 11/19/2021 to 14 days incarceration; $10 special assessment; $500 restitution.	Lolos received a full pardon on January 20, 2025
February 05, 2021	Michael John Lopatic Sr.	Federal: Obstruction of an Official Proceeding and Aiding and Abetting; Assaulting ... Certain Officers; Civil Disorder; Theft in a Federal Enclave; Entering ... in a Restricted Building or Grounds; Disorderly ... in a Restricted Building or Grounds; Engaging in Physical Violence in a Restricted Building or Grounds; Act of Physical Violence in the Capitol Grounds or Buildings		Lopatic pleaded Not Guilty to all charges. On 9/20/2022 the court granted abatement of prosecution. They have confirmation that the defendant died on July 3, 2022 in Pennsylvania.	
October 21, 2024	Juan Lopez-Antonio	Federal: Entering ... in a Restricted Building or Grounds; Disorderly ... in a Restricted Building or Grounds; Disorderly Conduct in a Capitol Building; Parading ... in a Capitol Building	Lopez-Antonio pleaded Not Guilty to all charges.	On 1/22/2025, the court grants the government's motion to dismiss the case with prejudice.	
October 21, 2024	Rebecca Lopez-Antonio	Federal: Entering ... in a Restricted Building or Grounds; Disorderly ... in a Restricted Building or Grounds; Disorderly Conduct in a Capitol Building; Parading ... in a Capitol Building	Lopez-Antonio pleaded Not Guilty to all charges.	On 1/22/2025, the court grants the government's motion to dismiss the case with prejudice.	
September 19, 2022	Paul Lovley	Federal: Parading ... in a Capitol Building	Lovley pleaded Guilty to the charge.	Sentenced on 6/13/2023 to 14 days intermittent incarceration; 36 months probation; $10 special assessment; $500 restitution.	Lovley received a full pardon on January 20, 2025
March 25, 2022	Carson S. Lucard	Federal: Parading ... in a Capitol Building	Lucard pleaded Guilty to the single charge.	Sentenced 6/24/2022 to 36 months Probation; 21 days of intermittent confinement; 60 days home detention; $10 special assessment, and restitution of $500.	Lucard received a full pardon on January 20, 2025
May 17, 2024	Larry John Lucas, Jr.	Federal: Disorderly Conduct in a Capitol Building or Grounds; Parading ... in a Capitol Building	Lucas pleaded Guilty to both charges.	Sentencing is set for 4/10/2025. On 1/23/2025, the court grants the government's motion to dismiss the case with prejudice.	
May 11, 2021	Anton Lunyk	Federal: Entering ... in a Restricted Building; Disorderly ... in a Restricted Building; Violent Entry and Disorderly Conduct in a Capitol Building; Parading ... in a Capitol Building	Lunyk pleaded Guilty to one charge: Parading ... in a Capitol Building. The other charges are dismissed.	Sentenced on 9/15/2022 to 12 months Probation with 2 of the twelve months to be served in Home Confinement, a Special Assessment of $10, Restitution of $500, a $742 Fine; 60 hours community service.	Lunyk received a full pardon on January 20, 2025
August 21, 2024	Anatoliy Anatolievich Lutsik	Federal: Civil Disorder; Assaulting ... Certain Officers; Entering ... in a Restricted Building or Grounds; Disorderly ... in a Restricted Building or Grounds; Engaging in Physical Violence in a Restricted Building or Grounds; Disorderly Conduct in a Capitol Building; Act of Physical Violence in the Capitol Grounds or Buildings; Parading ... in a Capitol Building	Lutsik pleaded Not Guilty to all charges.	On 1/22/2025, the court grants the government's motion to dismiss the case with prejudice	
January 25, 2024	Duong Dai Luu	Federal: Entering ... in a Restricted Building or Grounds; Disorderly ... in a Restricted Building or Grounds; Disorderly Conduct in a Capitol Building or Grounds; Parading ... in a Capitol Building	Luu pleaded Not Guilty to all charges.	Bench trial set for 2/10/2025. On 1/21/2025, the court grants the government's motion to dismiss the case with prejudice.	
January 25, 2021	Robert Anthony Lyon	Federal: Obstruction of an Official Proceeding and Aiding and Abetting; Theft of Government Property and Aiding and Abetting; Entering ... in a Restricted Building or Grounds; Disorderly ... in a Restricted Building or Grounds; Disorderly Conduct in a Capitol Building; Parading ... in a Capitol Building	Lyon pleaded Guilty to two charges: Theft of Government Property and Aiding and Abetting; and Disorderly ... in a Restricted Building or Grounds. The other charges are dismissed.	Sentenced on 9/22/2022 to 40 days Incarceration; Supervised release of 1 year; special assessment of $50; Restitution of $2000; Fine of $1000.	Lyon received a full pardon on January 20, 2025
August 19, 2024	William Christopher Lyon	Federal: Disorderly Conduct in a Capitol Building; Parading ... in a Capitol Building	Lyon pleaded Guilty to both charges.	Sentencing set for 2/26/2025. On 1/27/2025, the court grants the government's motion to dismiss the case with prejudice	
January 13, 2021	Kevin James Lyons	Federal: Entering ... Restricted Building or Grounds; Disorderly ... Restricted Building or Grounds; Entering and Remaining in Certain Rooms in the Capitol Building; Disorderly Conduct in a Capitol Building; Parading ... in a Capitol Building; Obstruction of an Official Proceeding and Aiding and Abetting	Not Guilty – all charges	Sentenced to 51 months in prison after being convicted of six charges: one felony and five misdemeanors. He was also given 36 months of supervised release and ordered to pay restitution of $2,000 to the Architect of the Capitol.	Lyons, 40, of Chicago, IL, filmed himself as he walked around the House Speaker's office and took a picture of himself reflected in a mirror. Lyons approached a coat hanging on a rack, removed a wallet from the jacket, and placed it inside his hooded zip-up pocket. After leaving the Capitol in a rideshare, Lyons posed for a photo holding a stolen framed photograph that he had taken from the House Speaker's office. The framed photograph was never recovered.

== See also ==
- Criminal proceedings in the January 6 United States Capitol attack
