= Worrall (surname) =

Worrall is a surname. Notable people with this surname include:

- Daniel Worrall (born 1991), Australian–English cricketer
- David Worrall (born 1990), English association football player
- David Worrall (composer) (born 1954), Australian composer
- Denis Worrall (1935–2023), South African academic, businessman, and former politician and diplomat
- Ernest Worrall (1898–1972), English artist
- Frank Worrall (born 1961), English journalist and author
- Fred Worrall (fl. 1930s), English association football player
- George Worrall (1855–1930), English association football player
- Harry Worrall (1918–1979), English association football player
- Jack Worrall (1861–1937), Australian rules footballer, cricketer, coach, sports journalist
- James Worrall (1914–2011), Canadian lawyer, olympic athlete, sports administrator
- Joe Worrall (referee) (born 1945), English football referee
- Joe Worrall (footballer) (born 1997), English footballer
- John Worrall (disambiguation) (several people)
- Madeleine Worrall (born 1977), Scottish actress (i.a. Foyle's War)
- Malika Zouhali-Worrall, British-Moroccan film director and editor
- Simon Worrall (born 1984), English rugby league player
- William P. Worrall (1827-1887), American politician

== See also ==
- Worrell, a similarly spelled surname
- Worrell (disambiguation)
