= Worrall (disambiguation) =

Worrall is an English village in Sheffield in the county of South Yorkshire.

Worrall may also refer to:

Surname

- David Worrall (born 1990), English association football player
- David Worrall (composer) (born 1954), Australian composer
- Denis Worrall (born 1935), South African academic, businessman, and former politician and diplomat
- Ernest Worrall (1898–1972), English artist
- Frank Worrall (born 1961), English journalist and author
- Fred Worrall (fl. 1930s), English association football player
- George Worrall (1855–1930), English association football player
- Harry Worrall (1918–1979), English association football player
- Jack Worrall (1861–1937), Australian rules footballer, cricketer, coach, sports journalist
- James Worrall (1914–2011), Canadian lawyer, olympic athlete, sports administrator
- Joe Worrall (referee) (born 1945), English football referee
- Joe Worrall (footballer) (born 1997), English footballer
- John Worrall (disambiguation) (several people)
- Madeleine Worrall (born 1977), Scottish actress (i.a. Foyle's War)
- Simon Worrall (born 1984), English rugby league player
- William P. Worrall (1827–1887), American politician

Middle name

- Antony Worrall Thompson (born 1951), English celebrity chef
- Thomas Worrall Casey (1869–1949), English politician
- Thomas Worrall Kent (1922–2011), English born Canadian economist, journalist, public servant
- William Worrall Mayo (1819–1911), English born American medical doctor and chemist (Mayo Clinic)

Other

- Worrall Covered Bridge, covered bridge in Rockingham, Vermont, United States

== See also ==
- Worrell (disambiguation)
