= Worrell =

Worrell is a mainly English surname. Notable people with this surname include:

- Andre Worrell, Barbadian politician
- Bernie Worrell (1944–2016), American keyboardist and composer
- Christopher Worrell (disambiguation), multiple people
- Cameron Worrell (born 1979), American football player
- David Worrell (born 1978), Irish football player
- Eric Worrell (1924–1987), Australian herpetologist
- Ernest P. Worrell, fictional character by Jim Varney
- Frank Worrell (1924–1967), West Indies cricketer and Jamaican senator after whom the Frank Worrell Trophy is named
- Lola Carrier Worrell (1870–1929) composer and doll designer
- Mark Worrell (born 1983), American baseball player
- Peter Worrell (born 1977), Canadian ice hockey player
- Tim Worrell (born 1967), American baseball player
- Todd Worrell (born 1959), American baseball player
- Trix Worrell (born 1960), English writer and director
- Worrell Sterling (born 1965), English football player

== See also ==
- Worrall (surname)
- Worrell (disambiguation)
- Worrall (disambiguation)
