= List of Wolverhampton Wanderers F.C. managers =

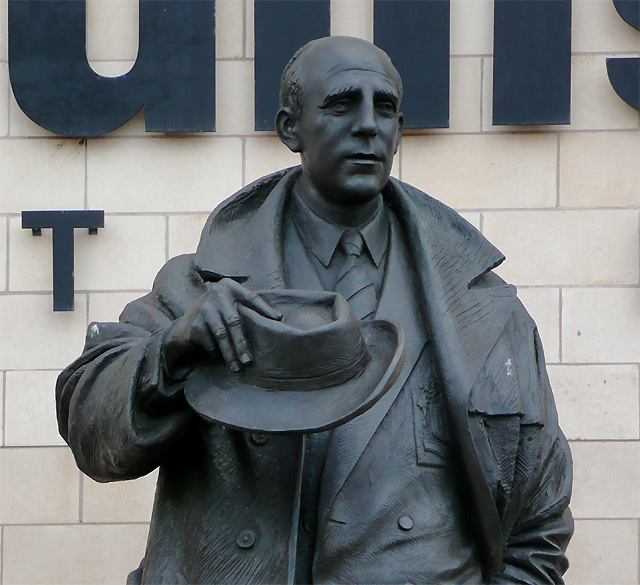
Stan Cullis was Wolverhampton Wanderers' most successful manager, winning three league titles and two FA Cups.

This article lists all managers, caretaker managers and/or head coaches of Wolverhampton Wanderers Football Club since its foundation is 1877 until the present. Served by 36 different permanent managers throughout its history, three-quarters of them were born in the United Kingdom with the remaining quarter consisting of Norwegian Ståle Solbakken (2012–13), Italian Walter Zenga (2016), Portuguese trio Nuno Espírito Santo (2017–2021), Bruno Lage (2021–2022) and Vítor Pereira (2024–2025) and Julen Lopetegui (2022–2023), who is Spanish, coming from overseas.

From 1877 to 1922, the team was selected by a committee whose secretary had the same powers and role as a manager/head coach has today. There were two secretaries during this period, George Worrall and Jack Addenbrooke, the latter being the longest serving manager in the club's history. In 1922, the club broke from this tradition and appointed George Jobey as the first full-time manager.

The club's most successful manager is Stan Cullis, who won three league championships, two FA Cups and one FA Charity/Community Shield and was the first to bring continental football to the club during his 16-year reign from 1948 to 1964. Previously also a notable player for the club, he narrowly missed out on becoming the first manager to win the league-and-cup double in English football history, when Burnley pipped his FA Cup winning team, to the league title by a single point in 1960.

Bill McGarry and John Barnwell are the only managers since Cullis to have won major silverware, both winning the League Cup (in 1974 and 1980, respectively). The former also took the club to the debut UEFA Cup final in 1972, its best performance in a continental campaign.

Graham Turner achieved three trophies in two seasons in the late 1980s, with back-to-back divisional titles (the Third and Fourth Divisions) and the Football League Trophy (now the EFL Trophy). Turner's success bucked a downward trend for the club in the mid-1980s that saw three different managers preside over three successive relegations.

Dave Jones, Mick McCarthy and Nuno Espírito Santo have all since had promotion successes that took Wolves into the Premier League. Jones won the 2003 First Division play-offs and McCarthy and Espírito Santo both won the EFL Championship (the former in 2008–09 and the latter in 2017–18). Kenny Jackett also recorded a promotion success, winning Football League One (now EFL League One) as champions with a record points total of 103 in 2013–14.

== Managers and head coaches ==
Only competitive first-team matches in official competitions are counted

Name	Nationality	From	To	P	W	D	L	Win %^{1}	Honours
George Worrall	England	August 1877	May 1885	4	1	1	2	25.0	
Jack Addenbrooke	England	August 1885	June 1922	1,125	455	220	450	40.4	1889 FA Cup runners-up 1893 FA Cup winners 1896 FA Cup runners-up 1908 FA Cup winners 1921 FA Cup runners-up
George Jobey	England	June 1922	May 1924	91	36	26	29	39.6	1923–24 Third Division (N) champions
Albert Hoskins	England	June 1924	March 1926	78	34	13	31	43.6	
Fred Scotchbrook	England	March 1926	June 1927	57	24	9	24	42.1	
Major Frank Buckley	England	July 1927	March 1944	681	281	136	264	41.3	1931–32 Second Division champions 1937–38 First Division runners-up 1938–39 First Division runners-up 1939 FA Cup runners-up 1942 War Cup winners
Ted Vizard	Wales	April 1944	May 1948	178	87	40	51	48.9	
Stan Cullis	England	June 1948	September 1964	748	350	171	227	46.8	1949 FA Cup winners 1949–50 First Division runners-up 1953–54 First Division champions 1954–55 First Division runners-up 1957–58 First Division champions 1958–59 First Division champions 1959–60 First Division runners-up 1959 FA Charity Shield winners 1960 FA Cup winners
Andy Beattie	Scotland	November 1964	September 1965	44	19	7	18	43.2	
Ronnie Allen	England	September 1965	November 1968	150	66	35	49	44.0	1966–67 Second Division runners-up
Bill McGarry	England	November 1968	May 1976	398	153	110	135	38.4	1971 Texaco Cup winners 1972 UEFA Cup runners-up 1974 League Cup winners
Sammy Chung	England	June 1976	November 1978	108	41	27	40	38.0	1976–77 Second Division champions
John Barnwell	England	November 1978	January 1982	166	64	40	62	38.6	1980 League Cup winners
Ian Greaves	England	February 1982	August 1982	20	5	6	9	25.0	
Graham Hawkins	England	August 1982	April 1984	90	26	28	36	28.9	1982–83 Second Division runners-up
Tommy Docherty	Scotland	June 1984	July 1985	48	9	12	27	18.8	
Bill McGarry	England	September 1985	November 1985	12	2	3	7	16.7	
Sammy Chapman	Northern Ireland	November 1985	August 1986	33	8	9	16	24.2	
Graham Turner	England	October 1986	March 1994	412	179	109	124	43.4	1987–88 Fourth Division champions 1988 Football League Trophy winners 1988–89 Third Division champions
Graham Taylor	England	March 1994	November 1995	91	36	29	26	39.6	
Mark McGhee	Scotland	December 1995	November 1998	159	65	39	55	40.9	
Colin Lee	England	November 1998	December 2000	111	44	33	34	39.6	
Dave Jones	England	January 2001	November 2004	187	75	52	60	40.1	2003 First Division play-off winners
Glenn Hoddle	England	December 2004	July 2006	76	27	34	15	35.5	
Mick McCarthy	Ireland	July 2006	February 2012	270	104	66	100	38.5	2008–09 Championship champions
Terry Connor	England	February 2012	June 2012	13	0	4	9	0.0	
Ståle Solbakken	Norway	1 July 2012	6 January 2013	30	10	5	15	33.3	
Dean Saunders	Wales	7 January 2013	7 May 2013	20	5	5	10	25.0	
Kenny Jackett	Wales	1 June 2013	29 July 2016	150	69	43	38	46.0	2013–14 League One champions
Walter Zenga	Italy	30 July 2016	25 October 2016	17	6	4	7	35.3	
Paul Lambert	Scotland	5 November 2016	30 May 2017	33	14	5	14	42.4	
Nuno Espírito Santo	Portugal	31 May 2017	1 June 2021	199	95	49	55	47.7	2017–18 Championship champions
Bruno Lage	Portugal	9 June 2021	2 October 2022	51	19	10	22	37.2	
Julen Lopetegui	Spain	14 November 2022	8 August 2023	27	10	6	11	37.0	
Gary O'Neil	England	9 August 2023	15 December 2024	63	20	11	32	31.7	
Vítor Pereira	Portugal	19 December 2024	2 November 2025	38	14	6	18	36.8	
Rob Edwards	Wales	12 November 2025	11 June 2026	30	5	9	16	16.7	
César Peixoto	Portugal	15 June 2026	Present	10	6	2	2	60.0	

Note: Win percentage is rounded to one decimal place.
