= Police Quarterly =

- Discipline: Criminology
- Language: English
- Edited by: John L. Worrall

Publication details
- History: 1998-present
- Publisher: SAGE Publications
- Frequency: Quarterly
- Impact factor: 1.865 (2017)

Standard abbreviations
- ISO 4: Police Q.

Indexing
- ISSN: 1098-6111 (print); 1552-745X (web)
- LCCN: 98000390
- OCLC no.: 150091551

Links
- Journal homepage; Online access; Online archive

Police Quarterly is a peer-reviewed academic journal that publishes papers in the field of criminology, in particular theoretical contributions, essays, and empirical studies on issues related to policing. The journal's editor-in-chief is John L. Worrall (University of Texas at Dallas). It was established in 1998 and is currently published by SAGE Publications on behalf of the Police Executive Research Forum and the Academy of Criminal Justice Sciences' Police section.

== Abstracting and indexing ==
Police Quarterly is abstracted and indexed in Scopus and the Social Sciences Citation Index. According to the Journal Citation Reports, its 2017 impact factor is 1.865, ranking it 20 out of 61 journals in the category "Criminology & Penology".
