= List of cases of the January 6 United States Capitol attack (T-Z) =

External videos
- 1st active duty Marine arrested in Capitol siege/WNT, ABC News

On January 6, 2021, thousands of Trump supporters participated in the U.S. Capitol attack, disrupting the joint session of Congress assembled to count electoral votes to formalize Joe Biden's victory in the 2020 United States presidential election.

By the end of the year, 725 people had been charged with federal crimes. That number rose to 1,000 by the second anniversary of the attack, to 1,200 by the third anniversary (three-quarters of whom had by then been found guilty) and to 1,500 before the fourth anniversary. As of January 20, 2025, 1,575 people had been charged in connection with the January 6 attack, of whom 1,021 had pleaded guilty and 249 had been convicted at trial.

Upon Donald Trump's inauguration on January 20, 2025, he pardoned all but 14 of those people. The remaining 14 people, though their convictions stood, were eligible for immediate release from prison, as he commuted their sentences to "time served". Following Trump's pardons, the United States Department of Justice (DOJ) moved to dismiss some cases awaiting trial or sentencing. In April 2026, DOJ prosecutors filed a request to vacate the felony convictions for four Proud Boys who had received commutations rather than pardons, and indicated an intention to make similar requests for other January 6 defendants who had received commutations.

After the pardon, some January 6 defendants and their survivors moved to sue the Department of Justice and federal law enforcement agencies. Most notably, the Department of Justice agreed to pay the family of Ashli Babbitt, who was fatally shot in the Capitol assault, $5 million in a lawsuit settlement. Other January 6 defendants have gone to court to have their sentencing fines refunded, or to file claims against the U.S. Department of Justice and other federal law enforcement agencies for injuries or property damage. In March 2026, some January 6 defendants and others present at the protest that day filed a class action lawsuit against the U.S. federal government, alleging that the U.S. Capitol Police and the Washington, D.C. Metropolitan Police Department caused the plaintiffs physical and emotional injuries while defending the Capitol.

In May 2026, a new "Anti-Weaponization Fund" was announced, setting aside $1.776 billion of public funds to distribute to Trump allies who claimed to be victims of federal "weaponization and lawfare”. This was described as part of a settlement to end Trump's lawsuit against the Internal Revenue Service. Facing pushback, however, the DOJ said it would not pursue the fund. A judge has demanded proof. Another judge sanctioned the attorneys.

Days after the fund was announced, the Department of Justice acknowledged it was removing news releases from its websites that had documented criminal charges, convictions and sentencings of January 6 rioters. It described these prosecutions as "the DOJ’s weaponization under the Biden administration" and the news releases about them as "partisan propaganda". Lawfare Media published the deleted Department of Justice press releases in a database; as of June 9, 2026, it contained over 5,700 restored documents.

== Previous sources of information ==
A list of "breach" cases, meaning cases in which the defendant was alleged to have entered a restricted area of the Capitol during the riot, was kept updated by the US Attorney's Office, District of Columbia. It was available until the morning of January 24, 2025, four days after President Trump had issued a blanket pardon, but later in the day, it said "Page not found". CNN reported its erasure the next day. Soon afterwards, some of the video evidence that had been part of court cases related to the prosecutions disappeared from a government server. A coalition of press organizations went to court over the missing evidence, and a judge subsequently ordered the government to stop removing the materials.

NPR has a database of all 1,575 cases in the Capitol attack prior to Trump's pardons, searchable by U.S. state, charges, and case status.

For plea deals entered between April–October 2021, BuzzFeed has a searchable table. After Trump's mass pardon in 2025, the Democratic Secretary of States Association launched a website to track the Capitol attackers' ongoing legal issues. Lawfare Media released a study on January 6 clemency recipients who were subsequently arrested or convicted of other crimes since the attack, finding 97 such cases as of June 4, 2026.

== Index ==
- List of cases of the January 6 United States Capitol attack (A-F)
- List of cases of the January 6 United States Capitol attack (G-L)
- List of cases of the January 6 United States Capitol attack (M-S)
- List of cases of the January 6 United States Capitol attack (T-Z)

== Table ==
Arrest date	Name	Charges	Pleas	Judgment	Notes
July 23, 2021	Andrew Quentin Taake	Federal: Civil Disorder; Obstruction of an Official Proceeding; Assaulting ... Certain Officers Using a Dangerous Weapon; Entering ... in a Restricted Building or Grounds with a Deadly or Dangerous Weapon; Disorderly ... in a Restricted Building or Grounds with a Deadly or Dangerous Weapon; Engaging in Physical Violence in a Restricted Building or Grounds with a Deadly or Dangerous Weapon; Disorderly Conduct in a Capitol Building; Impeding Passage Through the Capitol Grounds or Buildings; Act of Physical Violence in the Capitol Grounds or Buildings; Parading ... in a Capitol Building	Taake pleaded Guilty to one charge: Assaulting ... Certain Officers Using a Dangerous Weapon.	The other charges are dismissed. Sentenced on 6/5/2024 to 74 months incarceration; 36 months of supervised release; $2,000 in restitution; $100 special assessment.	After being granted clemency by President Donald Trump on January 20, 2025, Taake was arrested on February 6, 2025, by the Harris County District Attorney's (HCDA) Fugitive Apprehension Section. Prior to the events of January 6, Taake had been charged with online solicitation of a minor following a 2016 sting operation by the Internet Crimes against Children Task Force in the Houston area.
May 25, 2021	Jody Lynn Tagaris	Federal: Entering ... in a Restricted Building or Grounds; Disorderly ... in a Restricted Building or Grounds; Entering ... in Certain Rooms in the Capitol Building; Disorderly Conduct in a Capitol Building	Tagaris pleaded Guilty to one charge: Entering ... in Certain Rooms in the Capitol Building. The other charges are dismissed.	Sentenced on 6/6/2022 to 24 months probation; 60 hours of community service; $2,000 fine; $500 restitution; special assessment of $10.	Tagaris received a full pardon on January 20, 2025
March 14, 2021	George Pierre Tanios	Federal: Conspiracy to Impede or Injure an Officer; Assault on a Federal Officer with a Dangerous Weapon and Aiding and Abetting; Civil Disorder; Obstruction of an Official Proceeding; Entering ... Restricted Building or Grounds with a Deadly or Dangerous Weapon and Causing Significant Bodily Injury; Disorderly ... Restricted Building or Grounds with a Deadly or Dangerous Weapon and Causing Significant Bodily Injury; Engaging in Physical Violence in a Restricted Building or Grounds with a Deadly or Dangerous Weapon and Causing Significant Bodily Injury: Act of Physical Violence in the Capitol Grounds or Buildings	Not Guilty – all charges	5 months’ and 6 days’ incarceration, 12 months’ supervised release, $500 restitution	39-year-old man from Morgantown, West Virginia. One of the two men charged in connection with the death of Brian Sicknick. Court records show that the men, who had grown up together in New Jersey allegedly worked together to spray the officers with a toxic chemical that temporarily blinded them.
June 29, 2023	Taylor Franklin Taranto	Federal: Possession of an Unregistered Firearm; Carrying a Pistol Without a License (Outside Home or Place of Business) (2 counts); Possession of a Large Capacity Ammunition Feeding Device; Unlawful Possession of Ammunition; False Information and Hoaxes; Obstruction of an Official Proceeding; Entering ... in a Restricted Building or Grounds; Disorderly ... in a Restricted Building or Grounds; Disorderly Conduct in a Capitol Building; Parading ... in a Capitol Building; Criminal Forfeiture	Taranto pleaded Not Guilty to all charges.	On 1/25/2025, the government stated it had filed a motion to dismiss with prejudice Counts Seven, Eight, Nine, Ten, and Eleven of the Superseding Indictment. The government will continue prosecuting the charges unrelated to January 6 and intends to proceed with the trial that is scheduled to begin on May 12, 2025. On 2/12/2025, the court granted the government's partial motion to dismiss. Counts 7-11 are dismissed with prejudice.	Taranto was one of the few January 6th defendants who remained in prison after President Trump's pardon, having been held in pretrial detention in connection with unrelated June 2023 charges. In the 2023 case, Taranto was convicted of illegally possessing guns and ammunition near Barack Obama's's house after Donald Trump posted Obama's home address on social media that day. Taranto was also convicted of threatening on a livestream to blow up the National Institute of Standards and Technology. U.S. District Judge Carl Nichols sentenced Taranto to supervised release in that case. Two federal prosecutors who submitted a sentencing memo in the case that discussed Taranto's involvement in the January 6 United States Capitol Attack were placed on leave by the Justice Department the day after the court filing. On December 4, 2025, Justice Department prosecutors urged Judge Nichols to return Taranto to jail after he was seen loitering around the home of Representative Jamie Raskin, whom he had threatened previously. Judge Nichols did not issue an immediate ruling, but ordered Taranto back to his home in the Washington State and to not return to D.C. until the New Year.
March 8, 2022	Enrique Tarrio	Federal: Seditious Conspiracy; Conspiracy to Obstruct Official Proceeding; Obstruction of an Official Proceeding and Aiding and Abetting; Conspiracy to Prevent an Officer from Discharging Any Duties; Civil Disorder and Aiding and Abetting; Destruction of Government Property and Aiding and Abetting (2 counts); Assaulting ... Certain Officers (2 counts);	Tarrio pleaded Not Guilty to all charges. Jury selection began 12/19/2022. On 5/4/2023, the jury found Tarrio Guilty on six charges: Seditious Conspiracy; Conspiracy to Obstruct an Official Proceeding; Obstruction of an Official Proceeding and Aiding and Abetting; Conspiracy to Prevent an Officer from Discharging any Duties; Civil Disorder; Destruction of Government Property (fence). Not Guilty on one charge: Assaulting ... Certain Officers. No verdict on two charges: Destruction of Gov’t Property (window); Assaulting ... Certain Officers.	Sentenced on 9/5/2023 to 22 years incarceration; 36 months supervised release; $600 special assessment.	Tarrio received a full pardon on January 20, 2025
July 30, 2024	Jason Robert Tasker	Federal: Civil Disorder; Assaulting ... Certain Officers; Entering ... in a Restricted Building or Grounds; Disorderly ... in a Restricted Building or Grounds; Engaging in Physical Violence in a Restricted Building or Grounds; Disorderly Conduct in a Capitol Building; Act of Physical Violence in the Capitol Grounds or Buildings; Parading ... in a Capitol Building	Tasker pleaded Not Guilty to all charges.	On 1/22/2025, the court grants the government's motion to dismiss the case with prejudice	
August 24, 2023	Curtis Logan Tate	Federal: Assaulting ... Certain Officers Using a Dangerous Weapon (3 counts)	Tate pleaded Guilty to the three charges.	Sentenced on 7/9/2024 to 63 months incarceration; 36 months of supervised release; $300 special assessment; restitution of $3,176.	Tate received a full pardon on January 20, 2025
June 26, 2024	Thomas Eugene Tatum	Federal: Assaulting ... Certain Officers Using a Dangerous Weapon; Civil Disorder; Entering ... in a Restricted Building or Grounds with a Deadly or Dangerous Weapon; Disorderly ... in a Restricted Building or Grounds with a Deadly or Dangerous Weapon; Engaging in Physical Violence in a Restricted Building or Grounds with a Deadly or Dangerous Weapon; Disorderly Conduct in a Capitol Building; Act of Physical Violence in the Capitol Grounds or Buildings	Tatum pleaded Not Guilty to all charges.	On 1/21/2025, the court grants the government's motion to dismiss the case with prejudice.	
September 7, 2023	Chancellor Nathan Taylor	Federal: Forcibly Assault, Resist, Oppose, Impede, Intimidate or Interfere with Certain Designated Individuals; Knowingly Enter or Remain in any Restricted Building or Grounds Without Lawful Authority; Knowingly, and with Intent to Impede or Disrupt the Orderly Conduct of Government Business; Engaging in Physical Violence in a Restricted Building or Grounds; Disorderly Conduct in a Capitol Building; Act of Physical Violence in the Capitol Grounds or Buildings	Status Hearing continued to 2/13/2025.	On 1/22/2025, the court grants the government's motion to dismiss the case with prejudice.	
January 12, 2024	Christopher Taylor	Federal: Entering ... in a Restricted Building or Grounds; Disorderly ... in a Restricted Building or Grounds; Disorderly Conduct in a Capitol Building; Parading ... in a Capitol Building	Taylor pleaded Guilty to one charge: Entering ... in a Restricted Building or Grounds. The other charges are dismissed.	Sentenced on 11/22/2024 to 24 months' probation; $500 restitution; $25 special assessment.	Taylor received a full pardon on January 20, 2025
June 10, 2021	Russell Taylor	Federal: Conspiracy to Obstruct an Official Proceeding; Obstruction of an Official Proceeding and Aiding and Abetting; Obstruction of Law Enforcement During Civil Disorder and Aiding and Abetting; Two counts of Entering ... in a Restricted Building and Grounds and Carrying a Deadly or Dangerous Weapon (knife); Unlawful Possession of a Dangerous Weapon on Capitol Grounds or Buildings	Taylor pleaded Guilty to one charge: Conspiracy to Obstruct an Official Proceeding. The other charges are dismissed.	Sentenced on 5/3/2024 to 36 months of Probation; 6 months of home detention; special assessment of $100; restitution of $2,000; 100 hours of community service.	Taylor received a full pardon on January 20, 2025
January 22, 2024	Timothy Tedesco	Federal: Disorderly Conduct in a Capitol Building or Grounds; Parading ... in a Capitol Building	Tedesco pleaded Guilty to both charges.	Sentenced on 7/12/2024 to 36 Months Probation; 90 days location monitoring; $20 Special Assessment; Restitution of $500; Fine Of $10,000.	Tedesco received a full pardon on January 20, 2025
August 19, 2021	Cole Andrew Temple	Federal: Entering ... in a Restricted Building; Disorderly ... in a Restricted Building; Violent Entry and Disorderly Conduct; Parading ... in a Capitol Building	Temple pleaded Guilty to one charge: Parading ... in a Capitol Building. The other charges are dismissed.	Sentenced on 7/5/2023 to 36 Months Probation; 30 days location monitoring replaces 14 days intermittent confinement; Special Assessment of $10; restitution of $500.	Temple received a full pardon on January 20, 2025
June 29, 2021	George Amos Tenney III	Federal: Civil Disorder; Obstruction of an Official Proceeding and Aiding and Abetting; Assaulting ... Certain Officers; Entering or Remaining in any Restricted Building or Grounds; Disorderly ... in a Restricted Building or Grounds; Engaging in Physical Violence in a Restricted Building or Grounds; Disorderly Conduct in a Capitol Building; Act of Physical Violence in the Capitol Grounds or Buildings; Parading ... in a Capitol Building	Tenney pleaded Guilty to two charges: Civil Disorder and Obstruction of an Official Proceeding. The other charges are dismissed.	Sentenced on 12/5/2022 to 36 Months of Incarceration; 36 Months of Supervised Release; Special Assessment of $200; Restitution of $2,000.	Tenney received a full pardon on January 20, 2025
December 19, 2023	Troy James Terino	Federal: Disorderly Conduct in a Capitol Building or Grounds; Parading ... in a Capitol Building	Terino pleaded Guilty to the two charges.	Sentenced on 12/6/2024 to 36 Months of Probation (with conditions); Special Assessment of $20; Restitution of $500; Fine of $732.	Terino received a full pardon on January 20, 2025
November 30, 2021	Tyler John Tew	Federal: Entering ... in a Restricted Building or Grounds; Disorderly ... in a Restricted Building or Grounds; Disorderly Conduct in a Capitol Building; Parading ... in a Capitol Building	Tew pleaded Guilty to all charges.	Sentenced on 11/28/2023 to 2 years probation; $500 in restitution; $2,000 fine; $70 special assessment.	Tew received a full pardon on January 20, 2025
June 04, 2024	Jay Robert Thaxton	Federal: Civil Disorder; Entering ... in a Restricted Building or Grounds		The government has filed a request for dismissal that remains pending.	
November 14, 2022	Jacob Therres	Federal: Civil Disorder; Assaulting ... Certain Officers Using a Dangerous Weapon (2 counts); Entering ... in a Restricted Building or Grounds with a Deadly or Dangerous Weapon; Disorderly ... in a Restricted Building or Grounds; Engaging in Physical Violence in a Restricted Building or Grounds with a Deadly or Dangerous Weapon; Act of Physical Violence in the Capitol Grounds or Buildings	Therres pleaded Guilty to one charge: Assaulting ... Certain Officers Using a Dangerous Weapon. The other charges are dismissed.	Sentenced on 4/24/2023 to 40 months incarceration; 36 months Supervised Release; $100 Special Assessment; Restitution of $2,000.	Therres received a full pardon on January 20, 2025
January 26, 2023	Isaac Anthony Thomas	Federal: Civil Disorder; Obstruction of an Official Proceeding and Aiding and Abetting; Assaulting ... Certain Officers Using a Dangerous Weapon (2 counts); Entering or Remaining in an Restricted Building or Grounds with a Deadly or Dangerous Weapon; Disorderly or Disruptive Conduct in a Restricted Building or Grounds with a Deadly or Dangerous Weapon; Engaging in Physical Violence in a Restricted Building or Grounds with a Deadly or Dangerous Weapon; Disorderly Conduct in a Capitol Building; Act of Physical Violence in the Capitol Grounds or Buildings; Parading ... in a Capitol Building	Thomas pleaded Not Guilty to all charges. The court dismisses the Obstruction charge on 10/1/2024.	Jury trial set for 3/10/2025. On 1/24/2025, the court grants the government's motion to dismiss the case with prejudice	
May 26, 2021	Kenneth Joseph Owen Thomas	Federal: Civil Disorder; Obstruction of an Official Proceeding; Assaulting ... Certain Officers (5 counts); Entering ... in a Restricted Building or Grounds; Disorderly ... in a Restricted Building or Grounds; Engaging in Physical Violence in a Restricted Building or Grounds; Disorderly Conduct in a Capitol Building; Act of Physical Violence in the Capitol Grounds or Buildings	Thomas pleaded Not Guilty to all charges. Jury trial on 6/1/2023 found him Guilty on seven counts: Civil Disorder; Assaulting ... Certain Officers (4 counts); Entering ... in a Restricted Building or Grounds; Disorderly ... in a Restricted Building or Grounds. Not Guilty on three counts: Obstruction of an Official Proceeding; Engaging in Physical Violence in a Restricted Building or Grounds; Act of Physical Violence in the Capitol Grounds or Buildings. Noo consensus on the two remaining counts which were dismissed.	Sentenced on 11/16/2023 to 58 months of incarceration; 36 months of supervised release; $550 special assessment; $2,000 restitution; $20,000 fine.	Thomas received a full pardon on January 20, 2025
January 26, 2023	Isaac Anthony Thomas	Federal: Civil Disorder; Obstruction of an Official Proceeding and Aiding and Abetting; Assaulting ... Certain Officers Using a Dangerous Weapon (2 counts); Entering or Remaining in an Restricted Building or Grounds with a Deadly or Dangerous Weapon; Disorderly or Disruptive Conduct in a Restricted Building or Grounds with a Deadly or Dangerous Weapon; Engaging in Physical Violence in a Restricted Building or Grounds with a Deadly or Dangerous Weapon; Disorderly Conduct in a Capitol Building; Act of Physical Violence in the Capitol Grounds or Buildings; Parading ... in a Capitol Building	Thomas pleaded Not Guilty to all charges. The court dismisses the Obstruction charge on 10/1/2024.	Jury trial set for 3/10/2025. On 1/24/2025, the court grants the government's motion to dismiss the case with prejudice	
November 22, 2024	Dane Christoffer Thompson	Federal: Assaulting ... Certain Officers; Civil Disorder; Entering ... in a Restricted Building or Grounds; Disorderly ... in a Restricted Building or Grounds; Engaging in Physical Violence in a Restricted Building or Grounds; Disorderly Conduct in a Capitol Building; Act of Physical Violence in the Capitol Grounds or Buildings		On 1/29/2025, the court grants the government's motion to dismiss the case with prejudice.	
July 1, 2021	Devlyn Thompson	Federal: Assaulting ... Certain Officers Using a Dangerous Weapon	Guilty – one felony count: Assaulting ... Certain Officers Using a Dangerous Weapon. (August 6, 2021)	December 20, 2021: 46 months in prison	Washington resident. First participant to plead guilty to assaulting a Metro DC Police officer (along with Scott K. Fairlamb). Thompson received a full pardon on January 20, 2025.
January 25, 2021	Dustin Byron Thompson	Federal: Obstruction of an Official Proceeding and Aiding and Abetting; Theft of Government Property; Entering ... in a Restricted Building or Grounds; Disorderly ... in a Restricted Building or Grounds; Disorderly Conduct in a Capitol Building; Parading ... in a Capitol Building	Thompson pleaded Not Guilty to all charges. Found Guilty by Jury Trial on 4/14/2022 of all charges.	Sentenced 11/18/2022 to 36 months incarceration; 36 months of supervised release; $2,000 in restitution; $2,000 fine; $195 special assessment.	Thompson received a full pardon on January 20, 2025
August 22, 2024	Nathan A. Thornsberry	Federal: Civil Disorder; Assaulting ... Certain Officers; Entering ... in a Restricted Building or Grounds; Disorderly ... in a Restricted Building or Grounds; Engaging in Physical Violence in a Restricted Building or Grounds; Disorderly Conduct in a Capitol Building		Indicted by Grand Jury on 1/8/2025. On 1/21/2025, the court grants the government's motion to dismiss the case with prejudice	
June 30, 2021	Steven Daniel Thurlow	Federal: Entering ... in a Restricted Building; Disorderly ... in a Restricted Building; Violent Entry and Disorderly Conduct in a Capitol Building; Parading ... in a Capitol Building	Thurlow pleaded Guilty to one charge: Parading ... in a Capitol Building. The other charges are dismissed.	Sentenced 8/30/2022 to 24 months of probation, 80 hours of community service, $500 in restitution; $10 special assessment.	Thurlow received a full pardon on January 20, 2025
September 23, 2021	David Antonio Ticas	Federal: Entering ... in a Restricted Building or Grounds; Disorderly ... in a Restricted Building; Disorderly Conduct in a Capitol Building; Parading ... in a Capitol Building	Ticas pleaded Guilty to one charge: Parading ... in a Capitol Building. The other charges are dismissed.	Sentenced 7/15/22 to 14 days of incarceration, 24 months of probation, 90 days or location monitoring, 60 hours community service, $500 restitution, $10 special assessment. His application for early termination of probation is granted and his term of probation shall terminate as of October 23, 2023.	Ticas received a full pardon on January 20, 2025
June 21, 2022	Todd Tilley	Federal: Entering ... in a Restricted Building or Grounds; Disorderly ... in a Restricted Building or Grounds; Disorderly Conduct a Capitol Building or Grounds; Parading ... in a Capitol Building	Tilley pleaded Guilty to one charge: Parading ... in a Capitol Building. The other charges are dismissed.	Sentenced on 3/13/2023 to 48 Months of Probation; 7 days of intermittent confinement as a condition of probation; 60 hours of community service; $10 Special Assessment; Restitution in the amount of $500.	Tilley received a full pardon on January 20, 2025
April 20, 2021	Michael Timbrook	Federal: Entering ... in a Restricted Building; Disorderly ... in a Restricted Building; Entering ... in Certain Rooms in the Capitol Building; Violent Entry and Disorderly Conduct; Parading ... in a Capitol Building	Timbrook pleaded Guilty to one charge: Parading ... in a Capitol Building. The other charges are dismissed.	Sentenced on 5/20/2022 to 14 days intermittent incarceration on 7 consecutive weekends; 12 Months Probation; $10.00 Special Assessment; Restitution of $500.	Timbrook received a full pardon on January 20, 2025
June 29, 2023	Cody Lee Tippett	Federal: Entering ... in a Restricted Building or Grounds; Disorderly ... in a Restricted Building or Grounds; Disorderly Conduct in a Capitol Building or Grounds; Parading ... in a Capitol Building	Tippett pleaded Guilty to two charges: Disorderly Conduct in a Capitol Building or Grounds; Parading ... in a Capitol Building. The other charges are dismissed.	Sentenced on 4/4/2024 to 30 days incarceration; 3-year term of Probation; $20 special assessment; $500 in restitution; 60 hours of community service.	Tippett received a full pardon on January 20, 2025
November 29, 2023	Daniel L. Tocci	Federal: Destruction of Government Property; Entering ... in a Restricted Building or Grounds; Disorderly ... in a Restricted Building or Grounds; Disorderly Conduct in a Capitol Building; Parading ... in a Capitol Building	Tocci pleaded Not Guilty to all charges. Jury Trial set for 3/3/2025.	On 1/21/2025, the court grants the government's motion to dismiss the case with prejudice	Tocci was sentenced to 48 months' incarceration for child pornography possession in March 2026. The charges arose out of a search of Tocci's electronic devices conducted as part of the January 6 capitol attack investigation, and Tocci's lawyers originally argued that the mass pardon of January 6 capitol attack defendants invalidated the search warrant and should have led to dismissal of the child pornography charges. His attorneys withdrew the motion 10 days later, and Tocci pleaded guilty to the charges.
March 7, 2024	Ivan Todd	Federal: Disorderly Conduct in a Capitol Building; Parading ... in a Capitol Building	Todd pleaded Guilty to both charges.	Sentencing set for 3/10/2025. On 1/27/2025, the court grants the government's motion to dismiss the case with prejudice.	
May 10, 2022	John George Todd III	Federal: Obstruction of an Official Proceeding; Inflicting Bodily Injury on Certain Officers; Entering ... in a Restricted Building or Grounds; Disorderly ... in a Restricted Building or Grounds; Disorderly Conduct in a Capitol Building or Grounds; Parading ... in a Capitol Building	Todd pleaded Not Guilty to all charges. Found Guilty on all charges on 2/7/2024 in a Jury trial.	Sentenced on 5/31/2024 to 60 Months incarceration; Supervised Release Of 36 Months; Special Assessment of $270; restitution of $2,000 to architect of Capitol and $2,514.68 to MPD for injury to police officer.	Todd received a full pardon on January 20, 2025
January 22, 2021	Patricia Todisco	Federal: Obstruction of an Official Proceeding; Entering ... in a Restricted Building or Grounds; Disorderly ... in a Restricted Building or Grounds; Entering ... in Certain Rooms in the Capitol Building; Disorderly Conduct in a Capitol Building; Parading ... in a Capitol Building	Todisco pleaded Guilty to one charge: Parading ... in a Capitol Building. The other charges are dismissed.	Sentenced 7/12/2022 to 36 months of probation, $500 Restitution, $2,000 fine; $10 special assessment; 60 hours of community service.	Todisco received a full pardon on January 20, 2025
February 9, 2021	Benjamin H. Torre	Federal: Entering ... in a Restricted Building or Grounds; Disorderly ... in a Restricted Building or Grounds; Entering ... in Certain Rooms in the Capitol Building; Disorderly Conduct in a Capitol Building; Parading ... in a Capitol Building	Torre pleaded Guilty to one charge: Parading ... in a Capitol Building. The other charges are dismissed.	Sentenced 7/7/2022 to 12 months of probation, including two months of home detention; 60 hours of community service; $1,113 fine; $500 restitution; $10 special assessment.	Torre received a full pardon on January 20, 2025
February 1, 2021	Eric Chase Torrens	Federal: Entering ... in a Restricted Building or Grounds; Disorderly ... in a Restricted Building or Grounds; Disorderly Conduct in a Capitol Building; Parading ... in a Capitol Building	Torrens pleaded Guilty to one charge: Parading ... in a Capitol Building. The other charges were dismissed.	Sentenced 10/29/2021 to 36 months probation with home detention condition (90 days location monitoring); $10.00 special assessment; and $500.00 restitution.	Torrens received a full pardon on January 20, 2025
February 16, 2024	Barry Allen Toth	Federal: Civil Disorder; Entering ... in a Restricted Building or Grounds; Disorderly ... in a Restricted Building or Grounds; Disorderly Conduct in a Capitol Building or Grounds; Parading ... in a Capitol Building	Toth pleaded Not Guilty to all charges.	Jury trial set for 2/24/2025. On 1/21/2025, the court grants the government's motion to dismiss the case with prejudice.	
June 20, 2024	Nicholas Traina	Federal: Entering ... in a Restricted Building or Grounds; Disorderly ... in a Restricted Building or Grounds; Entering or Remaining in a Room in a Capitol Building; Disorderly Conduct in a Capitol Building or Grounds; Parading ... in a Capitol Building	Traina pleaded Not Guilty to all charges.	On 1/23/2025, the court grants the government's motion to dismiss the case with prejudice.	
June 22, 2023	Christina Traugh	Federal: Entering ... in a Restricted Building or Grounds; Disorderly ... in a Restricted Building or Grounds; Disorderly Conduct in a Capitol Building; Parading ... in a Capitol Building	Traugh pleaded Guilty to one charge: Parading ... in a Capitol Building. The other charges are dismissed.	Sentenced on 10/19/2023 to 18 months of probation; 45 days of home detention; Special assessment of $10; restitution of $500.	Traugh received a full pardon on January 20, 2025
August 3, 2023	Donald Trump	Federal: Conspiracy to Defraud the United States; Conspiracy to Obstruct an Official Proceeding; Obstruction of and Attempt to Obstruct an Official Proceeding; Conspiracy Against Rights	Trump pleaded Not Guilty to all charges.	On 11/25/2024, on the Government's Motion, the Court dismissed the operative superseding indictment without prejudice. On 12/6/2024, the court stated "in the interest of clarifying that there are no remaining counts against Defendant and that this case is fully closed, the Government's unopposed Supplement to its Motion to Dismiss is hereby GRANTED, and the original Indictment is likewise DISMISSED without prejudice."	
March 30, 2021	William Tryon	Federal: Entering ... in a Restricted Building; Disorderly ... in a Restricted Building; Violent Entry and Disorderly Conduct; Parading ... in a Capitol Building	Tryon pleaded Guilty to one charge: Entering ... in a Restricted Building. The remaining charges were dismissed.	Sentenced 1/14/2022 to 50 days of incarceration followed by 12 months of Supervised Release; special assessment of $25; $500 Restitution; $1,000 fine.	Tryon received a full pardon on January 20, 2025
January 17, 2023	Casey Jane Tryon-Castro	Federal: Civil Disorder; Assaulting ... Certain Officers; Robbery and Aiding and Abetting; Assaulting ... Certain Officers and Aiding and Abetting; Entering ... in a Restricted Building or Grounds; Disorderly ... in a Restricted Building or Grounds; Engaging in Physical Violence in a Restricted Building or Grounds; Impeding Passage Through the Capitol Grounds or Buildings	Tryon-Castro pleaded Not Guilty to all charges. Found Guilty on all charges in a Jury trial on 6/10/2024.	Sentenced on 11/20/2024 to 31 months incarceration; 36 months of supervised release; $2,000 in restitution; Special Assessment: $485.	Tryon-Castro received a full pardon on January 20, 2025
July 15, 2021	Kevin A. Tuck	Federal: Obstruction of an Official Proceeding; Entering ... in a Restricted Building or Grounds; Disorderly ... in a Restricted Building or Grounds; Entering ... in the Gallery of Congress; Disorderly Conduct in a Capitol Building; Parading ... in a Capitol Building	Tuck pleaded Guilty to one charge: Entering ... in a Restricted Building or Grounds. The other charges are dismissed.	Sentenced on 1/14/2025 to 6 months of Incarceration; 12 months of Supervised Release (with conditions); $25 Special Assessment; Restitution of $500; Fine of $2,000.	Tuck received a full pardon on January 20, 2025
July 15, 2021	Nathaniel A. Tuck	Federal: Obstruction of an Official Proceeding; Entering ... in a Restricted Building or Grounds; Disorderly ... in a Restricted Building or Grounds; Disorderly Conduct in a Capitol Building; Parading ... in a Capitol Building; Civil Disorder	Tuck pleaded Guilty to two charges: Entering ... in a Restricted Building or Grounds and Civil Disorder. The other charges are dismissed.	Sentenced on 1/8/2025 to 14 months of Incarceration; 36 months of Supervised Release (with conditions); $125 Special Assessment; Fine of $2,000; Restitution of $2,000.	Tuck received a full pardon on January 20, 2025
November 22, 2021	Robert Turner	Federal: Civil Disorder; Assaulting ... Certain Officers; Obstruction of an Official Proceeding and Aiding and Abetting; Entering ... in a Restricted Building or Grounds; Disorderly ... in a Restricted Building or Grounds; Engaging in Physical Violence in a Restricted Building or Grounds; Disorderly Conduct in a Capitol Building; Act of Physical Violence in the Capitol Grounds or Buildings; Parading ... in a Capitol Building	Turner pleaded Not Guilty to all charges. Found Guilty on all charges in a Jury trial on 6/11/2024. Obstruction conviction is dismissed on 1/14/2025.	Sentencing set for 1/29/2025. On 1/21/2025, the court grants the government's motion to dismiss the case with prejudice	
January 27, 2021	Israel Tutrow	Federal: Entering ... in a Restricted Building; Disorderly ... in a Restricted Building; Violent Entry and Disorderly Conduct in a Capitol Building; Parading ... in a Capitol Building	Tutrow pleaded Guilty to one charge: Parading ... in a Capitol Building. The other charges are dismissed.	Sentenced 12/21/2021 to 36 months of Probation; Special Assessment of $10.00; Restitution in the amount of $500.00; 90 days location monitoring/home detention.	Tutrow received a full pardon on January 20, 2025
July 20, 2023	Christian Peter Tyner	Federal : Entering ... in a Restricted Building or Grounds; Disorderly ... in a Restricted Building or Grounds; Disorderly Conduct in a Capitol Building; Parading ... in a Capitol Building	Tyner pleaded Guilty to two charges: Disorderly Conduct in a Capitol Building; Parading ... in a Capitol Building. The other charges are dismissed.	Sentenced on 2/16/2024 to 24 months probation; 30 days of home confinement; $500 restitution; $20 special assessment; 50 hours of community service.	Tyner received a full pardon on January 20, 2025
July 20, 2023	David Christian Tyner	Federal: Entering ... in a Restricted Building or Grounds; Disorderly ... in a Restricted Building or Grounds; Disorderly Conduct in a Capitol Building; Parading ... in a Capitol Building	Tyner pleaded Guilty to two charges: Disorderly Conduct in a Capitol Building; Parading ... in a Capitol Building. The other charges are dismissed.	Sentenced on 2/16/2024 to 36 months probation; 60 days of location monitoring; $1,000 fine; $500 restitution; $20 special assessment; 50 hours of community service.	Tyner received a full pardon on January 20, 2025
January 10, 2022	Thomas Uberto	Federal: Entering ... in a Restricted Building; Disorderly ... in a Restricted Building; Violent Entry and Disorderly Conduct in a Capitol Building; Parading ... in a Capitol Building	Uberto pleaded Guilty to one charge: Parading ... in a Capitol Building. The other charges are dismissed.	Sentenced on 2/6/2023 to 10 Days Incarceration; Special Assessment of $10; Restitution of $500.	Uberto received a full pardon on January 20, 2025
August 9, 2021	Brian Ulrich	Federal: Seditious Conspiracy; Conspiracy to Obstruct an Official Proceeding; Obstruction of an Official Proceeding and Aiding and Abetting; Conspiracy to Prevent an Officer from Discharging Any Duties; Tampering with Documents or Proceedings	Ulrich pleaded Guilty to two charges: Seditious Conspiracy and Obstruction of an Official Proceeding. The other charges are dismissed.	Sentenced on 11/19/2024 to 36 months probation; special assessment of $200; restitution of $2,000.	Ulrich received a full pardon on January 20, 2025
January 26, 2021	Chance Anthony Uptmore	Federal: Entering ... in a Restricted Building or Grounds; Disorderly ... in a Restricted Building or Grounds; Disorderly Conduct in a Capitol Building; Parading ... in a Capitol Building	Uptmore pleaded Guilty to one charge: Parading ... in a Capitol Building. The other charges are dismissed.	Sentenced 11/2/2022 to 30 days incarceration, 36 months of probation, $500 restitution; $10 special assessment.	Uptmore received a full pardon on January 20, 2025
January 26, 2021	James Herman Uptmore	Federal: Entering ... in a Restricted Building or Grounds; Disorderly ... in a Restricted Building or Grounds; Disorderly Conduct in a Capitol Building; Parading ... in a Capitol Building	Uptmore pleaded Guilty to one charge: Parading ... in a Capitol Building. The other charges are dismissed.	Sentenced 11/2/2022 to 36 months of probation, including 21 days of location monitoring, $500 restitution; $10 special assessment.	Uptmore received a full pardon on January 20, 2025
September 06, 2024	Stacey Lynne Urhammer	Federal: Entering or Remaining in a Restricted Building or Grounds; Disorderly or Disruptive Conduct in a Restricted Building or Grounds; Disorderly Conduct in a Capitol Building; Parading ... in a Capitol Building	Urhammer pleaded Guilty to two charges: Disorderly Conduct in a Capitol Building; Parading ... in a Capitol Building.	Sentencing set for 4/3/2025. On 1/24/2025, the court grants the government's motion to dismiss the case with prejudice.	
November 15, 2023	Joseph Vaglica	Federal: Entering ... in a Restricted Building or Grounds; Disorderly ... in a Restricted Building or Grounds; Entering ... in Certain Rooms in the Capitol Building; Disorderly Conduct in a Capitol Building or Grounds; Parading ... in a Capitol Building	Vaglica pleaded Not Guilty to all charges.	Jury trial set for 3/24/2025. On 1/23/2025, the court grants the government's motion to dismiss the case with prejudice.	
November 15, 2021	Rafael Valadez Jr.	Federal: Entering ... in a Restricted Building or Grounds; Disorderly ... in a Restricted Building or Grounds; Disorderly Conduct in a Capitol Building; Parading ... in a Capitol Building	Valadez pleaded Guilty to one charge: Parading ... in a Capitol Building. The other charges are dismissed.	Sentenced on 10/14/2022 to 30 days of incarceration, $500 restitution, $10 special assessment.	Valadez received a full pardon on January 20, 2025
October 24, 2023	Daniel Jay Valdez	Federal: Violent Entry and Disorderly Conduct in a Capitol Building or Grounds; Parading ... in a Capitol Building	Valdez pleaded Guilty to both charges.	Sentenced on 6/18/2024 to 36 months of probation; Restitution of $500; $20 special assessment; 50 hours of community service.	Valdez received a full pardon on January 20, 2025
October 18, 2023	Payton John Valdez	Federal: Violent Entry and Disorderly Conduct in a Capitol Building or Grounds; Parading ... in a Capitol Building	Valdez pleaded Guilty to both charges.	Sentenced on 9/10/2024 to 60 days incarceration; 3 years probation; $20 special assessment; $500 restitution.	Valdez received a full pardon on January 20, 2025
February 11, 2024	Andrew Valentin	Federal: Assaulting ... Certain Officers; Assaulting ... Certain Officers with a Deadly and Dangerous Weapon	Valentin pleaded Guilty to both charges.	Sentenced on 1/17/2025 to 30 months incarceration; 3 years supervised release; $200 special assessment; $2,000 restitution; $2,000 fine.	Valentin received a full pardon on January 20, 2025
November 10, 2021	Louis Valentin	Federal: Entering ... in a Restricted Building or Grounds; Disorderly ... in a Restricted Building or Grounds; Disorderly Conduct in a Capitol Building; Parading ... in a Capitol Building	Valentin pleaded Guilty to one charge: Parading ... in a Capitol Building. The other charges are dismissed.	Sentenced on 7/14/2023 to 12 months probation; 10 days intermittent confinement; $10 special assessment; $500 restitution; 60 hours of community service.	Valentin received a full pardon on January 20, 2025
February 12, 2024	Matthew Valentin	Federal: Assaulting ... Certain Officers (2 counts)	Valentin pleaded Guilty to both charges.	Sentenced on 1/17/2025 to 30 months incarceration; 3 years supervised release; $200 special assessment; $2,000 restitution; $2,000 fine.	Valentin received a full pardon on January 20, 2025
August 22, 2024	David Valentine	Federal: Civil Disorder; Entering ... in a Restricted Building or Grounds; Disorderly ... in a Restricted Building or Grounds; Disorderly Conduct in a Capitol Building or Grounds	Valentine pleaded Not Guilty to all charges.	On 1/21/2025, the court grants the government's motion to dismiss the case with prejudice	
January 06, 2025	Jonathan Wayne Valentour	Federal: Entering ... in a Restricted Building or Grounds; Disorderly ... in a Restricted Building or Grounds; Engaging in Physical Violence in a Restricted Building or Grounds; Disorderly Conduct in a Capitol Building; Act of Physical Violence in the Capitol Grounds or Buildings; Obstruction of Law Enforcement During Civil Disorder; Assaulting ... Certain Officers		On 2/4/2025, the court grants the government's motion to dismiss the case with prejudice.	
January 03, 2025	Joseph Charles Valentour	Federal: Entering ... in a Restricted Building or Grounds; Disorderly ... in a Restricted Building or Grounds; Engaging in Physical Violence in a Restricted Building or Grounds; Disorderly Conduct in a Capitol Building; Act of Physical Violence in the Capitol Grounds or Buildings; Obstruction of Law Enforcement During Civil Disorder; Assaulting ... Certain Officers		On 2/4/2025, the court grants the government's motion to dismiss the case with prejudice.	
January 13, 2022	Edward Vallejo	Federal: Seditious Conspiracy; Conspiracy to Obstruct an Official Proceeding; Obstruction of an Official Proceeding and Aiding and Abetting; Conspiracy to Prevent an Officer from Discharging Any Duties	Vallejo pleaded Not Guilty to all charges. Jury trial held 12/6/2022-1/23/2023. He was found Guilty on all charges.	Sentenced on 6/1/2023 to 36 months incarceration; 36 months of supervised release (including the first 12 months to be served on location monitoring); $400 special assessment.	A proclamation commutes the sentence to time served as of January 20, 2025
October 30, 2024	Daniel Van Oaks, Jr.	Federal: Obstruction of Law Enforcement During Civil Disorder; Assaulting ... Certain Officers; Knowingly Entering or Remaining in any Restricted Building or Grounds Without Lawful Authority; Disorderly ... in a Restricted Building or Grounds; Engaging in Physical Violence in a Restricted Building or Grounds; Disorderly Conduct in a Capitol Building; Act of Physical Violence in the Capitol Grounds or Buildings; Knowingly take or attempt to take from the person or presence of another, anything of value		On 1/24/2025, the court grants the government's motion to dismiss the case with prejudice	
May 9, 2023	Jennifer Vargas Geller	Federal: Entering ... in a Restricted Building or Grounds; Disorderly ... in a Restricted Building or Grounds; Disorderly Conduct in a Capitol Building; Parading ... in a Capitol Building			On 1/22/2025, the court grants the government's motion to dismiss the case with prejudice.
January 19, 2021	Hector Emanuel Vargas Santos	Federal: Entering ... Restricted Building; Disorderly ... Restricted Building; Violent Entry and Disorderly Conduct in a Capitol Building; Parading ... in a Capitol Building	Not Guilty – all charges	Sentenced to four months in prison, $2,500 fine, and $500 in restitution	Vargas Santos received a full pardon on January 20, 2025
November 15, 2022	Shelly Varney	Federal: Theft of Government Property; Entering ... in a Restricted Building or Grounds	Varney pleaded Guilty to both charges.	Sentenced on 5/8/2023 to 24 Days of incarceration; 12 Months of supervised release; special assessment of $50; fine of $1,000; Restitution of $500.	Varney received a full pardon on January 20, 2025
September 14, 2022	Salvatore Vassallo	Federal: Obstruction of Law Enforcement During Civil Disorder; Assaulting ... Certain Officers; Entering or Remaining in a Restricted Building or Grounds; Disorderly ... in a Restricted Building or Grounds; Engaging in Physical Violence in a Restricted Building or Grounds; Act of Disorderly Conduct in the Capitol Grounds or Buildings; Act of Physical Violence in the Capitol Grounds or Buildings	Vassallo pleaded Guilty to one charge: Assaulting ... Certain Officers. The other charges are dismissed.	Sentenced on 10/4/2023 to 18 months of incarceration; 36 months of Supervised Release; Restitution of $2,000; Special Assessment of $100; a fine of $3,000; 60 hours community service.	Vassallo received a full pardon on January 20, 2025
May 23, 2024	Randy Paul Verdun, Sr.	Federal: Disorderly Conduct in a Capitol Building or Grounds; Parading ... in a Capitol Building	Verdun pleaded Guilty to both charges.	Sentenced on 11/21/2024 to 24 months of Probation; $20 special assessment; $1,500 fine; $500 in restitution.	Verdun received a full pardon on January 20, 2025
January 5, 2024	Angel Villanueva	Federal: Disorderly Conduct in a Capitol Building or Grounds; Parading ... in a Capitol Building	Villanueva pleaded Guilty to both charges.	Sentenced to 24 Months of Probation; 4 months of Home Detention; 60 hours of community service; Special Assessment of $20; Restitution in the amount of $500.	Villanueva received a full pardon on January 20, 2025
March 23, 2022	Adam Villarreal	Federal: Civil Disorder; Assaulting ... Certain Officers Using a Dangerous Weapon; Assaulting ... Certain Officers and Aiding and Abetting; Theft of Government Property and Aiding and Abetting; Entering ... in a Restricted Building or Grounds with a Deadly or Dangerous Weapon; Disorderly ... in a Restricted Building or Grounds with a Deadly or Dangerous Weapon; Engaging in Physical Violence in a Restricted Building or Grounds with a Deadly or Dangerous Weapon; Impeding Passage Through the Capitol Grounds or Buildings		Villarreal was declared a fugitive. On 1/21/2025, the court grants the government's motion to dismiss the case with prejudice and arrest warrant quashed.	
March 8, 2022	Reva Vincent	Federal: Parading ... in a Capitol Building	Vincent pleaded Guilty to the single charge.	Sentenced on 9/21/2022 to 24 Months Probation; $10 Special Assessment; $1,500 Fine; Restitution of $500; 60 hours of community service.	Vincent received a full pardon on January 20, 2025
February 23, 2021	Lori Ann Vinson	Federal: Entering ... in a Restricted Building; Disorderly ... in a Restricted Building; Violent Entry and Disorderly Conduct in a Capitol Building; Parading ... in a Capitol Building	Vinson pleaded Guilty to one charge: Parading ... in a Capitol Building. The other charges were dismissed.	Sentenced 10/22/2021 to five years of probation, fined $5,000; $500 in restitution, $10 special assessment; 120 hours of community service.	Vinson received a full pardon on January 20, 2025
February 23, 2021	Thomas Roy Vinson	Federal: Entering ... in a Restricted Building; Disorderly ... in a Restricted Building; Violent Entry and Disorderly Conduct in a Capitol Building; Parading ... in a Capitol Building	Vinson pleaded Guilty to one charge: Parading ... in a Capitol Building. The other charges were dismissed.	Sentenced 10/22/2021 to five years of probation, fined $5,000; $500 in restitution; $10 special assessment; 120 hours of community service.	Vinson received a full pardon on January 20, 2025
May 15, 2024	Francis Joseph Vitollo	Federal: Entering ... in a Restricted Building or Grounds; Disorderly ... in a Restricted Building or Grounds; Disorderly Conduct in a Capitol Building or Grounds; Parading ... in a Capitol Building	Vitollo pleaded Not Guilty to all charges.	Jury trial set for 4/28/2025. On 1/21/2025, the court grants the government's motion to dismiss the case with prejudice.	
March 7, 2024	Annie Vo	Federal: Entering ... in a Restricted Building or Grounds; Disorderly ... in a Restricted Building orlGrounds; Disorderly Conduct in a Capitol Building; Parading ... in a Capitol Building	Vo pleaded Not Guilty to all charges.	On 1/21/2025, the court grants the government's motion to dismiss the case with prejudice.	
July 21, 2021	Antony Vo	Federal: Entering ... in a Restricted Building or Grounds; Disorderly ... in a Restricted Building or Grounds; Disorderly Conduct in a Capitol Building; Parading ... in a Capitol Building; Failure to Appear	Vo pleaded Not Guilty to all charges. Found Guilty on all charges in a Jury trial on 9/22/2023.	Sentenced on 4/10/2024 to 9 months incarceration; 12 months of Supervised Release; Special Assessment of $70; $1000 Fine. Charged on 1/15/2025 with Failure to Appear after failing to surrender for service of his sentence.	Vo received a full pardon on January 20, 2025
March 19, 2021	Philip C. Vogel	Federal: Theft of Property—$1,000 or Less; Entering ... in a Restricted Building; Disorderly ... in a Restricted Building; Violent Entry and Disorderly Conduct in a Capitol Building; Parading ... in a Capitol Building	Vogel pleaded Guilty to one charge: Theft of Property. The other charges are dismissed.	Sentenced on 8/25/2023 to 30 days incarceration; One Year of Supervised Release; $1,806 Restitution; $25 Special Assessment; 100 hours of community service.	Vogel received a full pardon on January 20, 2025
January 26, 2021	William Vogel	Federal: Entering ... in a Restricted Building; Disorderly ... in a Restricted Building; Violent Entry and Disorderly Conduct in a Capitol Building; Parading ... in a Capitol Building	Vogel pleaded Guilty to one charge: Parading ... in a Capitol Building. The other charges are dismissed.	Sentenced on 6/16/2023 to 30 days of incarceration; 36 Months of Probation; Special Assessment of $10; $500 restitution.	Vogel received a full pardon on January 20, 2025
October 24, 2024	Reynold Robert Voisine	Federal: Assaulting ... Certain Officers with a Deadly or Dangerous Weapon; - Civil Disorder; Entering ... in a Restricted Building or Grounds with a Deadly or Dangerous Weapon; Disorderly ... in a Restricted Building or Grounds with a Deadly or Dangerous Weapon; Engaging in Physical Violence in a Restricted Building or Grounds with a Deadly or Dangerous Weapon; Disorderly Conduct in a Capitol Building; Impeding Passage Through the Capitol Grounds or Buildings; Act of Physical Violence in the Capitol Grounds or Buildings		On 1/21/2025, the court grants the government's motion to dismiss the case with prejudice.	
October 24, 2024	Roger Alyre Voisine, Jr.	Federal: Assaulting ... Certain Officers with a Deadly or Dangerous Weapon; Civil Disorder; Entering ... in a Restricted Building or Grounds with a Deadly or Dangerous Weapon; Disorderly ... in a Restricted Building or Grounds with a Deadly or Dangerous Weapon; Engaging in Physical Violence in a Restricted Building or Grounds with a Deadly or Dangerous Weapon; Disorderly Conduct in a Capitol Building; Impeding Passage Through the Capitol Grounds or Buildings; Act of Physical Violence in the Capitol Grounds or Buildings		On 1/21/2025, the court grants the government's motion to dismiss the case with prejudice.	
January 19, 2022	Cody Vollan	Federal: Entering ... in a Restricted Building or Grounds; Disorderly ... in a Restricted Building or Grounds; Disorderly Conduct in a Capitol Building; Parading ... in a Capitol Building	Vollan pleaded Guilty to one charge: Parading ... in a Capitol Building. The other charges are dismissed.	Sentenced on 9/13/2022 to 12 months of probation, $500 restitution and $10 special assessment; 60 hours of community service.	Vollan received a full pardon on January 20, 2025
March 24, 2021	Eric Von Bernewitz	Federal: Entering ... in a Restricted Building or Grounds; Disorderly ... in a Restricted Building or Grounds; Disorderly Conduct in a Capitol Building; Parading ... in a Capitol Building	Von Bernewitz pleaded Guilty to one charge: Parading ... in a Capitol Building. The other charges are dismissed.	Sentenced 4/26/2022 to 24 months Probation; 60 days home confinement; $1000 fine; Restitution of $500; and a $10 Special Assessment.	Von Bernewitz received a full pardon on January 20, 2025
March 24, 2021	Paul Von Bernewitz	Federal: Entering ... in a Restricted Building or Grounds; Disorderly ... in a Restricted Building or Grounds; Disorderly Conduct in a Capitol Building; Parading ... in a Capitol Building	Von Bernewitz pleaded Guilty to one charge: Parading ... in a Capitol Building. The other charges are dismissed.	Sentenced 4/26/2022 to 30 days in jail; $500 restitution.	Von Bernewitz received a full pardon on January 20, 2025
June 15, 2023	Nicholas Von Keudell	Federal: Entering ... in a Restricted Building or Grounds; Disorderly ... in a Restricted Building or Grounds; Disorderly or Disruptive Conduct in the Capitol Grounds or Building; Parading ... in the Capitol Building	Von Keudell pleaded Guilty to two charges: Disorderly or Disruptive Conduct in the Capitol Grounds or Building; Parading ... in the Capitol Building. The other charges are dismissed.	Sentenced on 4/2/2024 to 24 months of probation; special assessment of $20; $500 in restitution; 100 hours of community service.	Von Keudell received a full pardon on January 20, 2025
March 26, 2021	Jeremy Vorous	Federal: Civil Disorder (2 counts); Obstruction of an Official Proceeding; Assaulting ... Certain Officers; Assaulting ... Certain Officers Using a Dangerous Weapon (2 counts); Entering ... in a Restricted Building or Grounds with a Deadly or Dangerous Weapon; Disorderly ... in a Restricted Building or Grounds with a Deadly or Dangerous Weapon; Engaging in Physical Violence in a Restricted Building or Grounds with a Deadly or Dangerous Weapon; Disorderly Conduct in a Capitol Building; Act of Physical Violence in the Capitol Grounds or Buildings; Parading ... in a Capitol Building	Vorous pleaded Not Guilty to all charges. On 9/6/2024, the court dismissed the Obstruction charge.	Jury trial set for 4/22/2025. On 1/21/2025, the court grants the government's motion to dismiss the case with prejudice	
January 4, 2024	Tom Vournas	Federal: Civil Disorder; Obstruction of an Official Proceeding; Assaulting ... Certain Officers Using a Dangerous Weapon or Inflicting Bodily Injury on Certain Officers; Entering ... in a Restricted Building or Grounds with a Deadly or Dangerous Weapon; Disorderly ... in a Restricted Building or Grounds with a Deadly or Dangerous Weapon; Engaging in Physical Violence in a Restricted Building or Grounds with a Deadly or Dangerous Weapon; Disorderly Conduct in a Capitol Building; Act of Physical Violence in the Capitol Grounds or Buildings; Parading ... in a Capitol Building	Vournas pleaded Guilty to one charge: Assaulting ... Certain Officers Using a Dangerous Weapon or Inflicting Bodily Injury on Certain Officers.	Sentencing set for 1/27/2025. On 1/21/2025, the court grants the government's motion to dismiss the case with prejudice.	
June 23, 2021	Mitchell Paul Vukich	Federal: Parading ... in a Capitol Building	Vukich pleaded Guilty to the single charge.	Sentenced 1/5/2022 to 30 days incarceration; Special Assessment of $10; Restitution of $500.	Vukich received a full pardon on January 20, 2025
September 30, 2021	Anthony Vuksanaj	Federal: Entering ... in a Restricted Building or Grounds; Disorderly ... in a Restricted Building or Grounds; Disorderly Conduct in a Capitol Building; Parading ... in a Capitol Building	Vuksanaj pleaded Guilty to one charge: Parading ... in a Capitol Building. The other charges are dismissed.	Sentenced 4/29/2022 to 42 days incarceration; 36 months probation; three months home detention; $2,000 fine; $500 restitution; $10 special assessment; 25 hours of community service.	Vuksanaj received a full pardon on January 20, 2025
December 10, 2021	Freedom Vy	Federal: Entering ... in a Restricted Building or Grounds; Disorderly ... in a Restricted Building or Grounds; Disorderly Conduct in a Capitol Building or Grounds; Parading ... in a Capitol Building	Vy pleaded Guilty to one charge: Entering ... in a Restricted Building or Grounds. The other charges are dismissed.	Sentenced on 9/24/2024 to 50 days of Incarceration; 12 months of Supervised Release (with conditions); $25 Special Assessment; Restitution of $500; Fine of $500.	Vy received a full pardon on January 20, 2025
January 26, 2021	Joshua Wagner	Federal: Entering ... in a Restricted Building; Disorderly ... in a Restricted Building; Violent Entry and Disorderly Conduct in a Capitol Building; Parading ... in a Capitol Building	Wagner pleaded Guilty to one charge: Parading ... in a Capitol Building. The other charges are dismissed.	Sentenced 2/11/2022 to 30 days incarceration; $10 special assessment; $500 restitution.	Wagner received a full pardon on January 20, 2025
May 29, 2024	Jeffrey A. Wakeford	Federal: Entering ... in a Restricted Building or Grounds; Disorderly ... in a Restricted Building or Grounds; Disorderly Conduct in a Capitol Building or Grounds; Parading ... in a Capitol Building	Wakeford pleaded Guilty to one charge: Entering ... in a Restricted Building or Grounds. The other charges are dismissed.	Sentenced on 11/7/2024 to 24 Months of Probation (with conditions); Restitution of $500; Special Assessment of $25.	Wakeford received a full pardon on January 20, 2025
May 28, 2021	Carey Jon Walden	Federal: Parading ... in a Capitol Building	Walden pleaded Guilty to the single charge.	Sentenced 1/19/2022 to 3 years of probation, 30 days home confinement/ location monitoring; $500 restitution; $10 special assessment; 60 hours of community service.	Walden received a full pardon on January 20, 2025
June 3, 2021	Jonathan Walden	Federal: Obstruction of an Official Proceeding and Aiding and Abetting; Entering ... in a Restricted Building or Grounds	Walden pleaded Guilty to one charge: Entering ... in a Restricted Building or Grounds.	Sentencing set for 2/11/2025. On 1/21/2025, the court grants the government's motion to dismiss the case with prejudice	
September 12, 2024	David Walker	Federal: Robbery in the Special Maritime and Territorial Jurisdiction; Assault with the Intent to Commit Another Felony in the Special Maritime and Territorial Jurisdiction; Assault in the Special Maritime and Territorial Jurisdiction; Destruction of Property in the Special Maritime and Territorial Jurisdiction; Entering ... in a Restricted Building or Grounds; Disorderly ... in a Restricted Building or Grounds; Engaging in Physical Violence in a Restricted Building or Grounds; Disorderly Conduct in a Capitol Building; Act of Physical Violence in the Capitol grounds or Buildings; Parading, Demonstrating. or Picketing in a Capitol Building		On 1/22/2025, the court grants the government's motion to dismiss the case with prejudice	
March 25, 2024	Donald Walker	Federal: Civil Disorder; Entering ... in a Restricted Building or Grounds; Disorderly ... in a Restricted Building or Grounds; Disorderly Conduct in a Capitol Building; Parading ... in a Capitol Building; Civil Disorder	Walker pleaded Guilty to one charge: Civil Disorder.	Sentencing set for 3/11/2025. On 1/23/2025, the court grants the government's motion to dismiss the case with prejudice.	
September 12, 2024	Philip Walker	Federal: Robbery in the Special Maritime and Territorial Jurisdiction; Assault with the Intent to Commit Another Felony in the Special Maritime and Territorial Jurisdiction; Assault in the Special Maritime and Territorial Jurisdiction; Destruction of Property in the Special Maritime and Territorial Jurisdiction; Entering ... in a Restricted Building or Grounds; Disorderly ... in a Restricted Building or Grounds; Engaging in Physical Violence in a Restricted Building or Grounds; Disorderly Conduct in a Capitol Building; Act of Physical Violence in the Capitol grounds or Buildings; Parading, Demonstrating. or Picketing in a Capitol Building		On 1/22/2025, the court grants the government's motion to dismiss the case with prejudice.	
October 28, 2023	Jason William Wallis	Federal: Civil Disorder; Assaulting ... Certain Officers Using a Dangerous Weapon, Inflicting Bodily Injury, and Aiding and Abetting; Entering ... in a Restricted Building or Grounds; Disorderly ... in a Restricted Building or Grounds; Engaging in Physical Violence in a Restricted Building or Grounds; Disorderly Conduct in a Capitol Building; Act of Physical Violence in the Capitol Grounds Buildings; Parading ... in a Capitol Building	Wallis pleaded Not Guilty to all charges.	Jury trial set for 4/14/2025. On 1/21/2025, the court grants the government's motion to dismiss the case with prejudice	
June 8, 2022	David Walls-Kaufman	Federal: Entering ... in a Restricted Building or Grounds; Disorderly ... in a Restricted Building or Grounds; Disorderly Conduct in a Capitol Building; Parading ... in a Capitol Building	Walls-Kaufman pleaded Guilty to one charge: Parading ... in a Capitol Building. The other charges are dismissed.	Sentenced on 6/13/2023 to 60 days incarceration; $10 Special Assessment; $500 Restitution; $500 fine.	Walls-Kaufman received a full pardon on January 20, 2025
September 27, 2023	Charles R. Walters	Federal: Entering ... in a Restricted Building or Grounds; Disorderly ... in a Restricted Building or Grounds; Disorderly Conduct on Capital Grounds; Parading ... in Capitol Building; Destruction of Government Property	Walters pleaded Guilty to one charge: Entering or Remaining in a Restricted Building or Grounds. Plea of Not Guilty entered on Counts 2–5. Found Guilty on Count 5 in a Bench trial on 9/17/2024. The Government agreed to dismiss Counts Two, Three, and Four at the time of sentencing.	On 1/22/2025, the court grants the government's motion to dismiss the case with prejudice	
July 15, 2024	Garth Nathaniel Walton	Federal: Civil Disorder; Assaulting ... Certain Officers; Entering ... in a Restricted Building or Grounds; Disorderly ... in a Restricted Building or Grounds; Engaging in Physical Violence in a Restricted Building or Grounds; Disorderly Conduct in a Capitol Building; Act of Physical Violence in the Capitol Grounds or Buildings		On 1/23/2025, the court ordered that the case is dismissed without prejudice.	
May 01, 2024	Donald Pin Wang	Federal: Entering ... in a Restricted Building or Grounds; Disorderly Conduct in a Restricted Building or Grounds; Disorderly Conduct in a Capitol Building; Parading ... in a Capitol Building	Wang pleaded Not Guilty to all charges.	On 1/21/2025, the court grants the government's motion to dismiss the case with prejudice.	
	Douglas K. Wangler	Federal: Entering ... Restricted Building; Disorderly ... Restricted Building; Violent Entry and Disorderly Conduct in a Capitol Building; Parading ... in a Capitol Building	Guilty – one charge: Parading ... in a Capitol Building. The other charges were dismissed.	Sentenced to two years of probation and 60 hours of community service	
August 10, 2023	Sean Ward	Federal: Parading ... in a Capitol Building	Ward pleaded Guilty to the charge.	Sentenced on 11/30/2023 to 24 months of Probation; 45 days location monitoring; $10 special assessment; $500 in restitution; 60 hours of community service.	Ward received a full pardon on January 20, 2025
May 4, 2022	Colton Wargo	Federal: Entering ... in a Restricted Building; Disorderly ... in a Restricted Building; Violent Entry and Disorderly Conduct in a Capitol Building; Parading ... in a Capitol Building	Wargo pleaded Guilty to one charge: Parading ... in a Capitol Building. The other charges are dismissed.	Sentenced on 6/15/2023 to 14 days incarceration; 36 months probation; $500 restitution; $10 special assessment; 60 hours of community service.	Wargo received a full pardon on January 20, 2025
May 4, 2022	Kimberly Wargo	Federal: Entering ... in a Restricted Building; Disorderly ... in a Restricted Building; Violent Entry and Disorderly Conduct in a Capitol Building; Parading ... in a Capitol Building	Wargo pleaded Guilty to one charge: Parading ... in a Capitol Building. The other charges are dismissed.	Sentenced on 6/15/2023 to 14 days incarceration; 36 months probation; $500 restitution; $10 special assessment; 60 hours of community service.	Wargo received a full pardon on January 20, 2025
May 18, 2021	Daniel Warmus	Federal: Entering ... in a Restricted Building or Grounds; Disorderly ... in a Restricted Building or Grounds; Disorderly Conduct in a Capitol Building; Parading ... in a Capitol Building	Warmus pleaded Guilty to Parading ... in a Capitol Building. The other charges are dismissed.	Sentenced on 9/27/2022 to 45 days of imprisonment; 24 months of probation; Restitution of $500; Special Assessment of $10; 60 hours community service.	Warmus received a full pardon on January 20, 2025
May 13, 2021	Christopher Warnagiris	Federal: Civil Disorder; Obstruction of an Official Proceeding; Assaulting ... Certain Officers; Entering ... Restricted Building or Grounds; Disorderly ... Restricted Building or Grounds; Engaging in Physical Violence in a Restricted Building or Grounds; Disorderly Conduct in a Capitol Building; Act of Physical Violence in the Capitol Grounds or Buildings; Parading ... in a Capitol Building	Not Guilty – all charges	Bench trial held 4/5/2024, waiting for verdict. Evidentiary Hearing set for 1/15/2025. On 1/22/2025, the court ordered that the case is dismissed without prejudice.	Active-duty major with the U.S. Marine Corps. The first active-duty service member to be charged in relation to the events of January 6. He allegedly pushed through a line of police officers guarding the Capitol's East Rotunda doors, held them open for others to enter the building, and later pushed a Capitol police officer who attempted to close them.
June 10, 2021	Erik Scott Warner	Federal: Conspiracy to Obstruct an Official Proceeding; Obstruction of an Official Proceeding and Aiding and Abetting; Entering ... in a Restricted Building and Grounds; Disorderly ... in a Restricted Building or Grounds; Tampering with Documents or Proceedings	Warner pleaded Not Guilty to all charges. Found Guilty in a Jury trial on 11/7/2023 on all charges.	Sentenced on 4/19/2024 to 27 months incarceration; 36-month term of supervised release; restitution in the amount of $2,000; special assessment of $350.	Warner received a full pardon on January 20, 2025
January 19, 2021	Jessica Marie Watkins	Federal: Conspiracy to obstruct an official proceeding; Obstruction of an official proceeding; Interfering with law enforcement officers during a civil disorder; Conspiracy to prevent an officer from discharging duties; Seditious conspiracy	Not guilty	Bench trial held 4/5/2024, waiting for verdict. Evidentiary Hearing set for 1/15/2025. On 1/22/2025, the court ordered that the case is dismissed without prejudice.	Member of Oath Keepers. One of the three who were indicted for conspiracy for planning their activities, alongside Thomas Edward Caldwell and Donovan Crowl. Eight to ten members of the group entered the Capitol wearing paramilitary gear and moving "in an organized and practiced fashion", according to the indictment. The group communicated with portable devices, with one member allegedly receiving a Facebook message reading "All members are in the tunnels under capital seal them in. Turn on gas." That same person allegedly received directions in navigating the Capitol, including "Tom all legislators are down in the Tunnels 3floors down" and "Go through back house chamber doors facing N left down hallway down steps." One alleged participant radioed to others, "We have a good group. We have about 30–40 of us. We are sticking together and sticking to the plan." Disavowed the Oath Keepers before trial. Went on trial with Oath Keeper leaders Stewart Rhodes and Kelly Meggs. Unlike Rhodes and Meggs, she was acquitted of seditious conspiracy. She was found guilty of the other charges.
October 09, 2024	Kelsie Marie Watkins	Federal: Entering ... in a Restricted Building or Grounds; Disorderly ... in a Restricted Building or Grounds; Disorderly Conduct in a Capitol Building; Parading ... in the Capitol Buildings	Watkins pleaded Not Guilty to all charges.	On 1/22/2025, the court grants the government's motion to dismiss the case with prejudice.	
September 28, 2021	Richard Bryan Watrous	Federal: Entering ... in a Restricted Building or Grounds; Disorderly ... in a Restricted Building or Grounds; Disorderly Conduct in a Capitol Building; Parading ... in a Capitol Building.	Watrous pleaded Guilty to one charge: Parading ... in a Capitol Building. The other charges are dismissed.	Sentenced on 4/21/2022 to 14 days intermittent incarceration; 36 months of probation; 60 days home confinement; $2,500 fine; $500 restitution; $10 special assessment.	Watrous received a full pardon on January 20, 2025
October 19, 2022	Jesse Watson	Federal: Entering ... in a Restricted Building or Grounds; Disorderly ... in a Restricted Building or Grounds; Disorderly Conduct in a Capitol Building or Grounds; Parading ... in a Capitol Building	Watson pleaded Guilty to one charge: Parading ... in a Capitol Building. The other charges are dismissed.	Sentenced on 8/25/2023 to 3 Years Probation; Restitution Of $500; Fine Of $5,000; Special Assessment Of $10; 200 hours of community service.	Watson received a full pardon on January 20, 2025
April 28, 2021	Sean David Watson	Federal: Entering ... in a Restricted Building; Disorderly ... in a Restricted Building; Violent Entry and Disorderly Conduct;; Parading ... in a Capitol Building	Watson pleaded Guilty to one charge: Parading ... in a Capitol Building. The other charges are dismissed.	Sentenced 9/6/2022 to 24 months of probation, including seven days of incarceration, 60 hours of community service, $500 restitution; $10 special assessment.	Watson received a full pardon on January 20, 2025
May 4, 2021	William Wright Watson	Federal: Obstruction of an Official Proceeding; Destruction of Government Property; Entering ... in a Restricted Building or Grounds with a Deadly or Dangerous Weapon; Disorderly ... in a Restricted Building or Grounds with a Deadly or Dangerous Weapon; Engaging in Physical Violence in a Restricted Building or Grounds with a Deadly or Dangerous Weapon; Disorderly Conduct in a Capitol Building; Act of Physical Violence in the Capitol Grounds or Buildings; Parading ... in a Capitol Building	Watson pleaded Not Guilty to all charges. He was found Guilty 11/18/2022 by the Court after agreeing to a stipulated set of facts on two charges: Obstruction of an Official Proceeding and Entering ... in a Restricted Building or Grounds with a Deadly or Dangerous Weapon. The other charges are dismissed.	Sentenced on 3/9/2023 to 36 Months of incarceration with credit for time served; 3 years of Supervised Release; 100 hours of community service; Special Assessment of $200; Restitution of $12,000.	Watson received a full pardon on January 20, 2025
February 28, 2023	Nathan Watts	Federal: Entering ... in a Restricted Building or Grounds; Disorderly ... in a Restricted Building or Grounds; Disorderly Conduct in a Capitol Building or Grounds; Parading ... in a Capitol Building	Watts pleaded Guilty to one charges: Parading ... in a Capitol Building. The other charges are dismissed.	Sentenced on 9/29/2023 to 36 months of probation; Restitution of $500; $10 Special Assessment; fine of $300; 50 hours of community service.	Watts received a full pardon on January 20, 2025
February 17, 2022	Jerry McKane Waynick	Federal: Civil Disorder; Assaulting ... Certain Officers (2 counts); Assaulting ... Certain Officers Using a Dangerous Weapon; Entering ... in a Restricted Building or Grounds with a Deadly or Dangerous Weapon; Disorderly ... in a Restricted Building or Grounds with a Deadly or Dangerous Weapon; Engaging in Physical violence in a Restricted Building or Grounds with a Deadly or Dangerous Weapon; Disorderly Conduct in a Capitol Building; Act of Physical Violence in the Capitol Building or Grounds; Parading ... in a Capitol Building	Waynick pleaded Not Guilty to all charges. Found Guilty on all charges in a Bench trial on 4/17/2024.	Sentenced on 11/26/2024 to 30 months of Incarceration; 36 months of Supervised Release (with conditions); Restitution of $2,000.	Waynick received a full pardon on January 20, 2025
February 17, 2022	Mark Waynick	Federal: Civil Disorder; Assaulting ... Certain Officers Using a Dangerous Weapon; Entering ... in a Restricted Building or Grounds with a Deadly or Dangerous Weapon; Disorderly ... in a Restricted Building or Grounds with a Deadly or Dangerous Weapon; Engaging in Physical violence in a Restricted Building or Grounds with a Deadly or Dangerous Weapon; Disorderly Conduct in a Capitol Building; Act of Physical Violence in the Capitol Building or Grounds; Parading ... in a Capitol Building	Waynick pleaded Not Guilty to all charges. Found Guilty on all charges in a Bench trial on 4/17/2024.	Sentenced on 11/26/2024 to 54 months of Incarceration; 36 months of Supervised Release (with conditions); Fine of $500; Restitution of $2,000.	Waynick received a full pardon on January 20, 2025
July 13, 2023	Frederick Webb	Federal: Parading ... in a Capitol Building	Webb pleaded Guilty to the charge.	Sentenced on 12/5/2023 to 14 days intermittent incarceration; 24 months probation; $500 restitution; $10 special assessment.	Webb received a full pardon on January 20, 2025
August 25, 2023	Tonya Webb	Federal: Entering ... in a Restricted Building or Grounds; Disorderly ... in a Restricted Building or Grounds; Disorderly Conduct in a Capitol Building; Parading ... in a Capitol Building	Jury Trial set for 2/24/2025.	On 1/22/2025, the court grants the government's motion to dismiss the case with prejudice.	
December 3, 2021	Matthew Jay Webler	Federal: Entering ... in a Restricted Building or Grounds; Disorderly ... in a Restricted Building or Grounds; Disorderly Conduct in a Capitol Building; Parading, Picketing or Demonstrating in a Capitol Building	Webler pleaded Guilty to one charge: Parading, Picketing or Demonstrating in a Capitol Building. The other charges are dismissed.	Sentenced on 5/3/2022 to 45 days incarceration; $500 Restitution; $10 special assessment.	Webler received a full pardon on January 20, 2025
February 21, 2021	Thomas Webster	Federal: Assaulting ... Certain Officers Using a Dangerous Weapon; Civil Disorder; Entering ... Restricted Building or Grounds with a Deadly or Dangerous Weapon; Disorderly ... Restricted Building or Grounds with a Deadly or Dangerous Weapon; Engaging in Physical Violence in a Restricted Building or Grounds with a Deadly or Dangerous Weapon; Disorderly Conduct Within the Capitol Grounds or Buildings; Act of Physical Violence within the Capitol Grounds or Buildings	Found guilty by a jury on May 2, 2022, of five felonies and one misdemeanor	Sentenced to 10 years in prison, three years of supervised release and $2,060 in restitution for assaulting a law enforcement officer with a deadly or dangerous weapon and four other felonies and one misdemeanor Webster received a full pardon on January 20, 2025.	
January 21, 2021	Bradley Wayne Weeks	Federal: Obstruction of an Official Proceeding; Entering ... in a Restricted Building or Grounds; Disorderly ... in a Restricted Building or Grounds; Disorderly Conduct in a Capitol Building; Parading ... in a Capitol Building	Weeks pleaded Not Guilty to all charges. Found Guilty on all charges at a Bench trial on 12/9/2022.	Sentenced on 8/16/2023 to 10 months incarceration; 24 months supervised release; 365 days location monitoring; Special Assessment of $170; Restitution of $2000; Fine of $500. On 9/9/2024 the USCA vacated the Obstruction conviction. Resentenced on 10/29/2024 to 10 Months Incarceration; 9 Months Supervised Release; $70 Special Assessment; Restitution of $2,000; Fine of $500.	Weeks received a full pardon on January 20, 2025
February 1, 2024	James Weeks	Federal: Civil Disorder; Assaulting ... Certain Officers; Destruction of Government Property; Entering ... in a Restricted Building or Grounds; Disorderly ... in a Restricted Building or Grounds; Engaging in Physical Violence in a Restricted Building or Grounds; Disorderly Conduct in a Capitol Building; Act of Physical Violence in the Capitol Grounds or Buildings	Weeks pleaded Guilty to one charge: Assaulting ... Certain Officers. The other charges are dismissed.	Sentenced on 10/4/2024 to 27 Months Incarceration; 36 Months Of Supervised Release; $100 Special Assessment; $5,000 Fine; Restitution of $2,774.	Weeks received a full pardon on January 20, 2025
January 10, 2023	Troy Weeks	Federal: Civil Disorder; Assaulting ... Certain Officers; Entering ... in a Restricted Building or Grounds; Disorderly ... in a Restricted Building or Grounds; Engaging in Physical Violence in a Restricted Building or Grounds; Impeding Passage Through the Capitol Grounds or Buildings	Weeks pleaded Guilty to all charges.	Sentenced on 11/1/2024 to 21 Months incarceration; 36 months Supervised release (with conditions); Special Assessment: $285; Restitution: $2,000.	Weeks received a full pardon on January 20, 2025
May 25, 2021	Adam Mark Weibling	Federal: Entering ... in a Restricted Building; Disorderly ... in a Restricted Building; Disorderly Conduct in a Capitol Building; Parading ... in a Capitol Building	Weibling pleaded Guilty to one charge: Parading ... in a Capitol Building. The other charges are dismissed.	Sentenced on 4/12/2023 to 24 Months Probation; 30 days location monitoring; 60 hours of community service; $10 special assessment; $500 restitution.	Weibling received a full pardon on January 20, 2025
October 21, 2021	Philip James Weisbecker	Federal: Entering ... in a Restricted Building; Disorderly Conduct in a Restricted Building; Disorderly Conduct in a Capitol Building; Parading ... in a Capitol Building	Weisbecker pleaded Guilty to charge: Parading ... in a Capitol Building. The other charges are dismissed.	Sentenced 6/27/2022 to 24 Months of Probation; 30 days intermittent confinement; Special Assessment of $10; Restitution of $500; Fine of $2,000.	Weisbecker received a full pardon on January 20, 2025
December 12, 2024	Walter Joseph Wentland	Federal: Obstruction of Law Enforcement during a Civil Disorder; Entering ... in a Restricted Building or Grounds; Disorderly ... in a Restricted Building or Grounds; Disorderly Conduct in a Capitol Building or Grounds; Parading ... in a Capitol Building		On 1/21/2025, the court grants the government's motion to dismiss the case with prejudice	
October 4, 2021	Isaac Westbury	Federal: Civil Disorder; Assaulting ... Certain Officers Using a Dangerous Weapon; Entering ... in a Restricted Building or Grounds with a Deadly or Dangerous Weapon; Disorderly ... in a Restricted Building or Grounds with a Deadly or Dangerous Weapon; Engaging in Physical Violence in a Restricted Building or Grounds with a Deadly or Dangerous Weapon; Disorderly Conduct in a Capitol Building; Act of Physical Violence in the Capitol Grounds or Buildings; Parading ... in a Capitol Building	Westbury pleaded Not Guilty to all charges.	Jury trial scheduled for 8/4/2025. On 1/21/2025, the court grants the government's motion to dismiss the case with prejudice	
April 9, 2021	Jonah Elijah Westbury	Federal: Entering ... Restricted Building and Grounds; Disorderly ... Restricted Building and Grounds; Disorderly ... Capitol Building and Grounds; Parading, Demonstrating or Picketing in a Capitol Building	Not Guilty – all charges	Jury trial reset for 8/4/2025. On 2/4/2025, the court grants the government's motion to dismiss the case with prejudice.	26-year-old man from Lindstrom, Minnesota. Authorities were able to identify him after receiving an anonymous tip about videos he posted of himself inside the Capitol to social media websites TikTok, Snapchat, and Twitter.
October 4, 2021	Robert Westbury	Federal: Entering ... in a Restricted Building or Grounds; Disorderly ... in a Restricted Building or Grounds; Disorderly Conduct in a Capitol Building; Parading ... in a Capitol Building	Westbury pleaded Not Guilty to all charges.	Jury trial scheduled for 8/4/2025. On 1/21/2025, the court grants the government's motion to dismiss the case with prejudice	
October 19, 2022	Tucker Weston	Federal: Civil Disorder; Assaulting ... Certain Officers; Entering ... in a Restricted Building or Grounds; Disorderly ... in a Restricted Building or Grounds; Engaging in Physical Violence in a Restricted Building or Grounds; Disorderly Conduct in a Capitol Building; Act of Physical Violence in the Capitol Grounds or Buildings; Parading ... in a Capitol Building	Weston pleaded Guilty to two charges: Civil Disorder and Assaulting ... Certain Officers. The other charges are dismissed.	Sentenced on 5/23/2024 to 24 Months of Incarceration; 3 Years of Supervised Release; Special Assessment of $200; Restitution of $2,000.	Weston received a full pardon on January 20, 2025
February 4, 2021	Paul S Westover	Federal: Parading ... in a Capitol Building	Westover pleaded Guilty to the charge.	Sentenced on 4/11/2022 to 45 days incarceration; $10 Special Assessment, and Restitution of $500.	Westover received a full pardon on January 20, 2025
May 13, 2022	Conlin Weyer	Federal: Entering ... in a Restricted Building or Grounds; Disorderly ... in a Restricted Building or Grounds; Disorderly Conduct in a Capitol Building or Grounds; Parading ... in a Capitol Building	Weyer pleaded Guilty to one charge: Entering ... in a Restricted Building or Grounds. The other charges are dismissed.	Sentenced on 10/5/2023 to 18 months of Probation; 30 days location monitoring; $25 Special Assessment; Restitution of $500; Fine of $500.	Weyer received a full pardon on January 20, 2025
June 28, 2021	Sandra Pomeroy Weyer	Federal: Obstruction of an Official Proceeding; Entering ... in a Restricted Building or Grounds; Disorderly ... in a Restricted Building or Grounds; Disorderly Conduct in a Capitol Building; Parading ... in a Capitol Building	Weyer pleaded Not Guilty to all charges. Found Guilty on all charges in a Bench trial on 6/6/2023.	Sentenced on 9/14/2023 to 14 months incarceration; 12 months supervised release; $2,000 restitution; $170 special assessment. On 9/9/2024, the USCA vacated the Obstruction conviction. Resentenced on 10/30/2024 to time served; 12 concurrent months of Supervised Release; Special Assessment of $40; Restitution of $500.	Weyer received a full pardon on January 20, 2025
September 18, 2023	Lance Douglas White	Federal: Entering ... in a Restricted Building; Disorderly ... in a Restricted Building; Violent Entry and Disorderly Conduct in a Capitol Building; Parading ... in a Capitol Building	White pleaded Guilty to one charge: Entering ... in a Restricted Building. The other charges are dismissed.	Sentenced on 2/26/2024 to 24 months of probation; 60 days of Home Detention; $500 restitution; $25 special assessment; 60 hours of community service.	White received a full pardon on January 20, 2025
April 8, 2021	Victoria Charity White	Federal: Civil Disorder; Entering ... Restricted Building or Grounds; Disorderly ... Restricted Building or Grounds; Disorderly Conduct in a Capitol Building or Grounds	White pleaded Guilty to one charge: Civil Disorder and Aiding and Abetting. The other charges are dismissed.	Sentenced on 11/20/2023 to 8 days of incarceration to be served on the weekends; 90 days of location monitoring; 24 months probation; $100 special assessment; $2,000 restitution.	39-year-old woman from Rochester, Minnesota. Second person from Minnesota to be charged in connection to the incident. Investigators cited surveillance video evidence of her and posts she had made on Facebook about her participation. White received a full pardon on January 20, 2025.
April 1, 2021	Jack Wade Whitton	Federal: Assaulting ... Certain Officers Using a Dangerous Weapon and Aiding and Abetting; Assaulting ... Certain Officers; Civil Disorder; Entering ... in a Restricted Building or Grounds with a Deadly or Dangerous Weapon; Disorderly ... in a Restricted Building or Grounds with a Deadly or Dangerous Weapon; Engaging in Physical Violence in a Restricted Building or Grounds with a Deadly or Dangerous Weapon; Act of Physical Violence in the Capitol Grounds or Buildings	Whitton pleaded Guilty to one charge: Assaulting ... Certain Officers Using a Dangerous Weapon. The other charges are dismissed.	Sentenced on 5/2/2024 to 57 months incarceration with credit for time served; 36 months of supervised release; $2,000 in restitution; Special Assessment of $100.	Whitton received a full pardon on January 20, 2025
May 11, 2021	Gary Laird Wickersham	Federal: Entering ... in a Restricted Building; Disorderly ... in a Restricted Building; Violent Entry and Disorderly Conduct in a Capitol Building; Parading ... in a Capitol Building	Wickersham pleaded Guilty to one charge: Parading ... in a Capitol Building. The other charges are dismissed.	Sentenced 12/21/2021 to 36 months of Probation; 90 days location monitoring/home confinement; a $10 special assessment; $2,000 fine; and $500 in restitution.	Wickersham received a full pardon on January 20, 2025
July 29, 2021	Jacob Kyle Wiedrich	Federal: Parading ... in a Capitol Building	Wiedrich pleaded Guilty to the single charge.	Sentenced 1/19/2022 to 3 years probation; 90 hours location monitoring/home confinement; special assessment of $10; restitution of $500; 100 hours of community service. On 11/13/2023 the court grants the motion for Early Termination of Probation and his probation is terminated.	Wiedrich received a full pardon on January 20, 2025
September 21, 2021	David W. Wiersma	Federal: Entering ... in a Restricted Building or Grounds; Disorderly ... in a Restricted Building or Grounds; Disorderly Conduct in a Capitol Building; Parading ... in a Capitol Building	Wiersma pleaded Guilty to one charge: Parading ... in a Capitol Building. The other charges are dismissed.	Sentenced 11/29/2022 to 18 Months of Probation; Fine of $1500; Special Assessment of $10; Restitution of $500; 100 hours of community service.	Wiersma received a full pardon on January 20, 2025
April 6, 2021	John Clarence Wilkerson IV	Federal: Entering ... in a Restricted Building; Disorderly ... in a Restricted Building; Violent Entry and Disorderly Conduct in a Capitol Building; Parading ... in a Capitol Building	Wilkerson pleaded Guilty to one charge: Parading ... in a Capitol Building. The other charges were dismissed.	Sentenced 11/16/2021 to 36 months of Probation; $500 restitution; $10 special assessment; a fine of $2,500; and 60 hours of community service.	Wilkerson received a full pardon on January 20, 2025
May 30, 2023	Ulises Wilkinson	Federal: Entering ... in a Restricted Building or Grounds; Disorderly ... in a Restricted Building or Grounds; Entering ... in the Gallery of Congress; Disorderly Conduct in a Capitol Building or Grounds; Parading ... in a Capitol Building	Wilkinson pleaded Guilty to two charges: Disorderly Conduct in a Capitol Building or Grounds; Parading ... in a Capitol Building. The other charges are dismissed.	Sentenced on 6/28/2024 to 12 months probation; Special Assessment of $20; Restitution of $500; 40 hours of community service.	Wilkinson received a full pardon on January 20, 2025
June 8, 2023	William Lance Wilkerson	Federal: Parading ... in a Capitol Building	Wilkerson pleaded Guilty to the charge.	Sentenced on 11/20/2023 to 24 Months of Probation (with conditions); Restitution of $500; Special Assessment of $10; 50 hours of community service.	Wilkerson received a full pardon on January 20, 2025
June 30, 2021	Ricky Christopher Willden	Federal: Civil Disorder; Assaulting ... Certain Officers; Entering ... in a Restricted Building or Grounds; Disorderly ... in a Restricted Building or Grounds; Engaging in Physical Violence in a Restricted Building or Grounds; Disorderly Conduct in a Capitol Building; Act of Physical Violence in the Capitol Grounds or Buildings; Parading ... in a Capitol Building	Willden pleaded Guilty to one charge: Assaulting ... Certain Officers. The other charges are dismissed.	Sentenced 8/5/2022 to 24 months incarceration; three years of supervised release, $2,000 restitution; $100 special assessment.	Willden received a full pardon on January 20, 2025
August 31, 2023	Peter Willey	Federal: Civil Disorder; Entering ... in a Restricted Building or Grounds; Disorderly ... in a Restricted Building or Grounds; Disorderly Conduct in a Capitol Building	Willey pleaded Not Guilty to all charges. On 9/27/2024, he received a partial verdict of Not Guilty on Counts 2 and 3. On 10/29/2024, found Guilty on counts 1 and 4.	Sentencing set for 2/28/2025. On 2/24/2025, the court grants the government's motion to dismiss the case with prejudice.	
January 12, 2021	Andrew James Williams	Federal: Parading ... in a Capitol Building	Williams pleaded Guilty to the charge.	Sentenced 2/9/2022 to 24 months of probation; $500 of restitution; $10 special assessment; 60 hours of community service.	Williams received a full pardon on January 20, 2025
March 26, 2021	Anthony Robert Williams	Federal: Obstruction of an Official Proceeding and Aiding and Abetting; Entering ... in a Restricted Building or Grounds; Disorderly ... in a Restricted Building or Grounds; Disorderly Conduct in a Capitol Building; Parading ... in a Capitol Building. 12/19/2024: Civil Disorder	Williams pleaded Not Guilty to all charges. Jury trial found Williams Guilty on all charges on 6/30/2022.	Sentenced on 9/16/2022 to 60 months incarceration; 36 months supervised release; $5,000 fine; $2,000 restitution; $170 special assessment. On 9/12/2024, the USCA vacated the Obstruction conviction. On 12/19/2024, a superseding indictment was filed charging him with only one charge: Civil Disorder. He pleaded Not Guilty to the charge on 1/8/2025. On 1/22/2025, the court ordered that the case is dismissed without prejudice.	
August 30, 2022	Carrie Ann Williams	Federal: Entering ... in a Restricted Building or Grounds; Disorderly ... in a Restricted Building or Grounds; Disorderly Conduct in a Capitol Building; Parading ... in a Capitol Building	Williams pleaded Guilty to one charge: Parading ... in a Capitol Building. The other charges are dismissed.	Sentenced on 3/20/2023 to 24 Months Probation; 30 days location monitoring; 60 hours of community service; $500 Restitution and $10 Special Assessment.	Williams received a full pardon on January 20, 2025
August 1, 2023	Dustin Ray Williams	Federal: Civil Disorder; Assaulting ... Certain Officers; Entering ... in a Restricted Building or Grounds; Disorderly ... in a Restricted Building or Grounds; Engaging in Physical Violence in a Restricted Building or Grounds; Disorderly Conduct in the Capitol Grounds or Buildings; Act of Physical Violence in the Capitol Grounds or Buildings	Williams pleaded Guilty to all charges.	Sentenced on 11/21/2024 to 22 Months Incarceration; 36 Months Supervised Release; Restitution Of $2,000; Special Assessment of $295.	Williams received a full pardon on January 20, 2025
March 24, 2021	Elizabeth Rose Williams	Federal: Entering ... in a Restricted Building or Grounds; Disorderly ... in a Restricted Building or Grounds; Disorderly Conduct in a Capitol Building; Parading ... in a Capitol Building	Williams pleaded Guilty to one charge: Parading ... in a Capitol Building. The other charges are dismissed.	Sentenced on 1/16/2025 to 12 months Probation; $10 Special Assessment; Restitution of $500.	Williams received a full pardon on January 20, 2025
August 29, 2023	Elliot Patrick Williams	Federal: Entering ... in a Restricted Building or Grounds; Disorderly ... in a Restricted Building or Grounds; Disorderly Conduct in a Capitol Building or Grounds; Parading ... in a Capitol Building	Williams pleaded Guilty to one charge: Disorderly ... in a Restricted Building or Grounds. The other charges are dismissed.	Sentenced on 4/18/2024 to 30 days incarceration; 1-year term of supervised release; $25 special assessment; $500 in restitution; 50 hours of community service.	Williams received a full pardon on January 20, 2025
November 14, 2024	Leander Antwione Williams	Federal: Assaulting ... Certain Officers; Civil Disorder; Entering ... in a Restricted Building or Grounds; Disorderly ... in a Restricted Building or Grounds; Engaging in Physical Violence in a Restricted Building or Grounds; Disorderly Conduct in a Capitol Building; Act of Physical Violence in the Capitol Grounds or Buildings	Williams pleaded Not Guilty to all charges.	On 1/22/2025, the court grants the government's motion to dismiss the case with prejudice.	
July 30, 2024	Micheal Kieth Williams	Federal: Civil Disorder; Entering ... in a Restricted Building or Grounds; Disorderly ... in a Restricted Building or Grounds; Entering ... on the Floor of Congress; Disorderly Conduct in a Capitol Building; Parading ... in the Capitol Building.		On 1/22/2025, the court ordered that the case is dismissed without prejudice.	
January 18, 2021	Riley June Williams	Federal: Civil Disorder; Obstruction of an Official Proceeding; Assaulting ... Certain Officers; Theft of Government Property; Entering ... Restricted Building or Grounds; Disorderly ... Restricted Building or Grounds; Disorderly Conduct in a Capitol Building; Parading ... in a Capitol Building	Not Guilty – all charges	Convicted on six counts	22-year-old woman from Harrisburg, Pennsylvania, accused of planning to sell Nancy Pelosi's laptop to the Foreign Intelligence Service of Russia, the country's main spy agency. The laptop was stolen from a conference room during the Capitol siege. Williams fled her home, telling her mother "she would be gone for a couple of weeks", changed her telephone number, and removed all of her social media accounts. In an affidavit updated January 19, 2021, she was additionally charged with two felonies. On January 21, she was released from custody to live with her mother while awaiting trial. On November 21, 2022, the jury deadlocked on the charge of "aiding and abetting the theft" of Pelosi's laptop but convicted Williams of six other charges.
June 4, 2021	Timothy Wayne Williams	Federal: Entering ... in a Restricted Building or Grounds; Disorderly ... in a Restricted Building or Grounds; Disorderly Conduct in a Capitol Building or Grounds; Parading ... in a Capitol Building; Theft of Government Property	Williams pleaded Guilty to two charges: Entering ... in a Restricted Building or Grounds and Theft of Government Property. The other charges are dismissed.	Sentenced on 6/21/2023 to 6 Months of Incarceration;12 months of supervised release with 6 months of home confinement; Special Assessment $50; Restitution of $500; 60 hours of community service.	Williams received a full pardon on January 20, 2025
	Troy Dylan Williams	Federal: Entering ... Restricted Building or Grounds; Disorderly ... Restricted Building or Grounds; Disorderly Conduct in a Capitol Building or Grounds; Parading ... in a Capitol Building	Guilty – one charge: Parading ... in a Capitol Building. The other charges are dismissed.	Sentenced to three years of probation, 15 days of confinement, 60 hours of community service and $500 in restitution	
May 20, 2021	Vic Don Williams	Federal: Entering ... in a Restricted Building; Disorderly ... in a Restricted Building; Violent Entry and Disorderly Conduct in a Capitol Building; Parading ... in a Capitol Building	Williams pleaded Guilty to one charge: Parading ... in a Capitol Building. The other charges are dismissed.	Sentenced 2/7/2022 to 12 Months of Probation; 60 days home confinement/location monitoring; Special Assessment of $10.00; Fine of $1500.00; Restitution of $500.00; 60 hours of community service.	Williams received a full pardon on January 20, 2025
July 18, 2024	Amy Rebekah Willis	Federal: Entering ... in a Restricted Building or Grounds; Disorderly ... in a Restricted Building or Grounds; Disorderly Conduct in a Capitol Building or Grounds; Parading ... in a Capitol Building		On 2/24/2025, the court grants the government's motion to dismiss the case with prejudice.	
July 25, 2024	Patricia Marie Wills	Federal: Entering ... in a Restricted Building or Grounds; Disorderly ... in a Restricted Building or Grounds; Disorderly Conduct in a Capitol Building or Grounds; Parading ... in a Capitol Building	Wills pleaded Guilty to two charges: Disorderly Conduct in a Capitol Building or Grounds; Parading ... in a Capitol Building.	Sentencing set for 2/19/2025. On 1/21/2025, the court grants the government's motion to dismiss the case with prejudice.	
May 25, 2023	Dan Edwin Wilson	Federal: Conspiracy to Impede or Injure Officer; Conspiracy to Obstruct an Official Proceeding; Obstruction of an Official Proceeding; Entering ... in a Restricted Building or Grounds; Disorderly ... in a Restricted Building or Grounds; Disorderly Conduct in a Capitol Building; Parading ... in a Capitol Building	Wilson pleaded Guilty to one charge: Conspiracy to Impede or Injure Officer. The other charges are dismissed.	Sentenced on 8/28/2024 to 60 months incarceration; 36 months of supervised release; $2,000 in restitution; $100 special assessment.	Wilson received a full pardon on January 20, 2025
April 15, 2021	Duke Edward Wilson	Federal: Assaulting ... Certain Officers; Civil Disorder; Entering ... in a Restricted Building or Grounds; Disorderly ... in a Restricted Building or Grounds; Obstruction of an Official Proceeding; Violent Entry and Disorderly Conduct on Capitol Grounds; Violent Entry and Disorderly Conduct on Capitol Grounds; Engaging in Physical Violence in a Restricted Building or Grounds; Act of Physical Violence in the Capitol Grounds or Buildings	Wilson pleaded Guilty to two charges: Assaulting ... Certain Officers; and Obstruction of an Official Proceeding. The other charges were dismissed.	Sentenced 3/4/2022 to 51 months incarceration to run concurrent; 36 months Supervised Release to run concurrent; a $100 Special Assessment on each of the counts totaling $200.	Wilson received a full pardon on January 20, 2025
September 13, 2021	Gary Wilson	Federal: Entering ... in a Restricted Building or Grounds; Disorderly ... in a Restricted Building or Grounds; Disorderly Conduct in a Capitol Building; Parading ... in a Capitol Building; Entering ... in the Gallery of Congress; Obstruction of an Official Proceeding and Aiding and Abetting; Theft of Government Property	Wilson pleaded Not Guilty to all charges. Found Guilty on one charge in a Stipulated Bench trial on 3/20/2024: Theft of Government Property. The other charges are dismissed.	Sentenced on 7/2/2024 to 30 days incarceration; 12 months supervised release; $500 restitution; $25 special assessment.	Wilson received a full pardon on January 20, 2025
August 19, 2021	Jodi Lynn Wilson	Federal: Entering ... in a Restricted Building; Disorderly ... in a Restricted Building; Violent Entry and Disorderly Conduct; Parading ... in a Capitol Building	Wilson pleaded Guilty to one charge: Parading ... in a Capitol Building. The other charges are dismissed.	Sentenced on 6/5/2023 to 20 days incarceration; 36 Months Probation; Special Assessment of $10; restitution of $500.	Wilson received a full pardon on January 20, 2025
August 18, 2021	Kelsey Leigh Ann Wilson	Federal: Parading ... in a Capitol Building	Wilson pleaded Guilty to the single charge.	Sentenced 1/27/2022 to 24 months probation; 30 days home detention; 60 hours community service; $10 special assessment; $500 restitution.	Wilson received a full pardon on January 20, 2025
September 9, 2023	Ryan Wilson	Federal: Civil Disorder; Assaulting ... Certain Officers; Assaulting ... Certain Officers Using a Dangerous Weapon; Entering ... in a Restricted Building or Grounds With a Deadly or Dangerous Weapon; Disorderly ... in a Restricted Building or Grounds With a Deadly or Dangerous Weapon; Engaging in Physical Violence in a Restricted Building or Grounds With a Deadly or Dangerous Weapon; Disorderly Conduct in a Capitol Building; Act of Physical Violence in the Capitol Grounds or Buildings	Wilson pleaded Not Guilty to all charges. Found Guilty on all charges in a Bench trial on 10/10/2024.	Sentencing reset for 1/22/2025. On 1/21/2025, the court grants the government's motion to dismiss the case with prejudice	
May 3, 2022	William Todd Wilson	Federal: Seditious Conspiracy; Obstruction of an Official Proceeding	Wilson pleaded Guilty to both charges.	Sentenced on 12/18/2024 to probation for 36 months; restitution of $2,000; special assessment of $200.	Wilson received a full pardon on January 20, 2025
February 19, 2021	Zachary John Wilson	Federal: Parading ... in a Capitol Building	Wilson pleaded Guilty to the single charge.	Sentenced 1/27/2022 to 24 months probation; 45 days home detention; 60 hours community service; $10 special assessment; $500 restitution.	Wilson received a full pardon on January 20, 2025
July 19, 2022	Dova Alina Winegeart	Federal: Attempted Destruction of Government Property; Entering ... in any Restricted Building or Grounds; Disorderly ... in a Restricted Building or Grounds; Engaging in Physical Violence in a Restricted Building or Grounds; Act of Physical Violence in the Capitol Grounds or Buildings	Winegeart pleaded Not Guilty to all charges. Found Guilty on one charge, Attempted Destruction of Government Property (misdemeanor version), in a Bench trial on 7/16/2024. Found Not Guilty on the remaining charges.	Sentenced on 12/9/2024 to 4 Months of Incarceration; 12 Months of Supervised Release (with conditions); Special Assessment of $25; Fine of $1,000.	Winegeart received a full pardon on January 20, 2025
January 26, 2021	Dana Joe Winn	Federal: Obstruction of an Official Proceeding; Entering ... in a Restricted Building or Grounds; Disorderly ... in a Restricted Building or Grounds; Disorderly Conduct in a Capitol Building; Parading ... in a Capitol Building	Winn pleaded Guilty to one charge: Entering ... in a Restricted Building or Grounds. The other charges are dismissed.	Sentenced 12/20/2021 to 12 Months Probation; 10 days location monitoring; $25 Special Assessment; $500 restitution; 100 hours of community service.	Winn received a full pardon on January 20, 2025
May 1, 2023	Jared Lane Wise	Federal: Civil Disorder; Assaulting ... Certain Officers; Entering ... in a Restricted Building or Grounds; Disorderly ... in a Restricted Building or Grounds; Disorderly Conduct in a Capitol Building; Parading ... in a Capitol Building	Wise pleaded Not Guilty to all charges.	Jury trial commenced on 1/10/2025. On 1/21/2025, the court dismissed the Case on Government's Motion. Defendant release conditions terminated.	In his trial, Wise admitted to repeatedly urging other January 6 rioters to kill U.S. Capitol police officers. In 2025, Wise became a senior advisor to the Department of Justice.
April 17, 2024	Lance Wisham	Federal: Knowingly Entering or Remaining in any Restricted Building or Grounds Without Lawful Authority; Disorderly ... in a Restricted Building or Grounds; Disorderly Conduct in a Capitol Building or Grounds; Parading ... in a Capitol Building		On 2/19/2025, the court grants the government's motion to dismiss the case with prejudice.	
February 25, 2021	Jeffery Shane Witcher	Federal: Obstruction of an Official Proceeding; Entering ... in a Restricted Building or Grounds; Disorderly ... in a Restricted Building or Grounds; Disorderly Conduct in a Capitol Building; Parading ... in a Capitol Building	Witcher pleaded Guilty to one count of: Entering ... in a Restricted Building or Grounds. The remaining charges were dismissed.	Sentenced 2/4/2022 to 12 months of Probation; Special Assessment of $25; Restitution of 500; 60 hours of community service.	Witcher received a full pardon on January 20, 2025
April 6, 2021	Shawn Bradley Witzemann	Federal: Entering ... in a Restricted Building or Grounds; Disorderly ... in a Restricted Building or Grounds; Disorderly ... in a Capitol Building; Parading ... in a Capitol Building	Witzemann pleaded Guilty to one charge: Parading ... in a Capitol Building. The other charges are dismissed.	Sentenced on 1/12/2023 to 24 Months of Probation; 7 days of intermittent confinement; Special Assessment of $10; Restitution of $500; 60 hours of community service.	Witzemann received a full pardon on January 20, 2025
December 13, 2023	Patrick Woehl	Federal: Entering ... in a Restricted Building or Grounds; Disorderly ... in a Restricted Building or Grounds; Disorderly Conduct in a Capitol Building or Grounds; Parading ... in a Capitol Building	Woehl pleaded Not Guilty to all charges. Found Guilty on all charges in a Bench trial on 6/6/2024.	Sentenced on 9/23/2024 to 6 months of incarceration; 12 months supervised release; $500 restitution; $70 special assessment; 50 hours of community service.	Woehl received a full pardon on January 20, 2025
October 26, 2022	Henos Woldemichael	Federal: Civil Disorder; Entering ... in a Restricted Building or Grounds; Disorderly ... in a Restricted Building or Grounds; Disorderly Conduct in a Capitol Building; Parading ... in a Capitol Building			On 1/22/2025, the court grants the government's motion to dismiss the case with prejudice.
March 5, 2021	Matthew Mark Wood	Federal: Obstruction of an Official Proceeding and Aiding and Abetting; Entering ... in a Restricted Building or Grounds; Disorderly ... in a Restricted Building or Grounds; Entering ... in Certain Rooms in the Capitol Building; Disorderly Conduct in a Capitol Building; Parading ... in a Capitol Building	Wood pleaded Guilty to all six charges.	Sentenced 11/28/2022 to 3 years of probation, location monitoring for the first 12 months of probation, 100 hours of community service, $2,000 restitution; $180 special assessment.	Wood received a full pardon on January 20, 2025
June 24, 2021	Shane Jason Woods	Federal: Civil Disorder; Striking, Beating, and Wounding within the Territorial Jurisdiction of the United States; Assaulting ... Certain Officers; Entering ... in Restricted Grounds; Disorderly ... in Restricted Grounds; Engaging in Physical Violence in a Restricted Grounds; Act of Physical Violence in the Capitol Grounds; Simple Assault within the Territorial Jurisdiction	Woods pleaded Guilty to two charges: Striking, Beating, and Wounding within the Territorial Jurisdiction of the United States; and Assaulting ... Certain Officers. The other charges are dismissed.	Sentenced on 10/4/2023 to 54 months incarceration; 36 months supervised release; $125 special assessment; $2,000 restitution.	Woods, also known as Shane Castleman, was the 500th person arrested in connection with the Capitol attack, as well as the first to be charged with assaulting a member of the media. During the riot, Woods tackled a female Capitol Police officer whom he outweighed by more than 100 pounds, as well as a Reuters cameraman. On October 4, 2023, Woods was sentenced to 54 months in prison and 36 months of supervised release. Woods received a full pardon on January 20, 2025. On November 8, 2022, after being pulled over by Divernon police, Woods fatally struck 35-year-old Lauren Wegner and injured two other people while driving down the wrong side of Interstate 55 in Skokie, Illinois. His blood alcohol content was more than twice the legal limit. On April 30, 2025, Woods was acquitted of first-degree murder in Wegner's death, though he was convicted of aggravated driving under the influence and reckless homicide. He was sentenced to 17 years in prison in the death.
August 19, 2024	Donald Ross Workman, Jr.	Federal: Civil Disorder; Assaulting ... Certain Officers; Entering ... in a Restricted Building or Grounds; Disorderly ... in a Restricted Building or Grounds; Engaging in Physical Violence in a Restricted Building or Grounds; Disorderly Conduct in a Capitol Building; Act of Physical Violence in the Capitol Grounds or Buildings	Workman pleaded Not Guilty to all charges.	On 1/21/2025, the court grants the government's motion to dismiss the case with prejudice.	
March 12, 2021	Christopher John Worrell	Federal: Obstruction of an Official Proceeding and Aiding and Abetting; Entering ... in a Restricted Building or Grounds with a Deadly or Dangerous Weapon; Disorderly ... in a Restricted Building or Grounds with a Deadly or Dangerous Weapon; Engaging in Physical Violence in a Restricted Building or Grounds Using a Deadly or Dangerous Weapon; Act of Physical Violence in the Capitol Grounds or Buildings; Civil Disorder; Assaulting ... Certain Officers Using a Dangerous Weapon	Worrell pleaded Not Guilty to all charges. Bench trial began 4/27/2023. On 5/12/2023, he was found Guilty on all charges.	Sentenced on 1/4/2024 to 120 months incarceration; 36 months of supervised release; restitution in the amount of $2,000; special assessment of $610.	Worrell received a full pardon on January 20, 2025
October 6, 2021	Donnie Duane Wren	Federal: Civil Disorder; Assaulting ... Certain Officers; Entering ... in a Restricted Building or Grounds; Disorderly ... in a Restricted Building or Grounds; Engaging in Physical Violence in a Restricted Building or Grounds; Disorderly Conduct in a Capitol Building; Act of Physical Violence in the Capitol Grounds or Buildings	Wren pleaded Not Guilty to all charges. On 5/5/2023, a jury found him Guilty on three charges: Civil Disorder; Assaulting ... Certain Officers; Entering ... in a Restricted Building or Grounds; and Not Guilty of the other four charges.	Sentenced on 10/16/2023 to 12 months and one day in prison; 24 months of supervised release; special assessment of $225; Fine of $2,500.	Wren received a full pardon on January 20, 2025
October 23, 2024	Jamie Wright	Federal: Civil Disorder; Entering ... in a Restricted Building or Grounds; Disorderly ... in a Restricted Building or Grounds; Disorderly Conduct in a Capitol Building	Wright pleaded Not Guilty to all charges.	On 1/24/2025, the court grants the government's motion to dismiss the case with prejudice.	
May 3, 2021	John Douglas Wright	Federal: Civil Disorder; Obstruction of an Official Proceeding; Entering ... in a Restricted Building or Grounds; Disorderly ... in a Restricted Building or Grounds; Engaging in Physical Violence in a Restricted Building or Grounds; Disorderly Conduct in the Capitol Grounds or Buildings; Act of Physical Violence in the Capitol Grounds or Buildings; Parading ... in a Capitol Building; False Statement to Federal Agent	Wright pleaded Guilty to one charge: Obstruction of an Official Proceeding. The other charges are dismissed.	Sentenced on 3/6/2023 to 49 Months incarceration; Supervised Release of 36 Months; Special Assessment of $100; restitution of $2,000.	Wright received a full pardon on January 20, 2025
January 15, 2021	Andrew Wrigley	Federal: Entering ... in a Restricted Building; Disorderly ... in a Restricted Building; Violent Entry and Disorderly Conduct in a Capitol Building; Parading ... in a Capitol Building	Wrigley pleaded Guilty to one charge: Parading ... in a Capitol Building. The other charges were dismissed.	Sentenced 12/2/2021 to 18 months of probation in Pennsylvania; community service; a $2,000 fine; $500 in restitution; 60 hours community service; $10 special assessment.	Wrigley received a full pardon on January 20, 2025
July 21, 2024	Mark Christian Wroblewski	Federal: Disorderly Conduct in a Capitol Building; Parading, Picketing, and Demonstrating in a Capitol Building	Wroblewski pleaded Guilty to both charges.	Sentencing reset for 2/4/2025. On 1/22/2025, the court ordered that the case is dismissed without prejudice	
November 14, 2022	Douglas Wyatt	Federal: Assaulting ... Certain Officers Using a Dangerous Weapon	Wyatt pleaded Guilty to the charge.	Sentenced on 2/2/2024 to 46 months incarceration; 36 months supervised release; $2,000 restitution; and $100 special assessment.	Wyatt received a full pardon on January 20, 2025
July 24, 2023	James Wyman	Federal: Entering ... in a Restricted Building or Grounds	Wyman pleaded Guilty to the single charge.	Sentenced on 1/31/2024 to 30 days Incarceration; 12 months Supervised Release; $500 Restitution; $25 Special Assessment; 60 hours of community service.	Wyman received a full pardon on January 20, 2025
November 16, 2022	Tyng Jing Yang	Federal: Civil Disorder; Entering ... in a Restricted Building or Grounds; Disorderly ... in a Restricted Building or Grounds; Disorderly Conduct in a Capitol Building; Parading ... in a Capitol Building	Yang pleaded Guilty to one charge: Civil Disorder. The other charges are dismissed.	Sentenced on 2/6/2024 to six days of intermittent confinement; 60 days of location monitoring; 24 months of Probation; Special Assessment of $100; Fine of $1,000; Restitution of $2,000.	Yang received a full pardon on January 20, 2025
September 26, 2023	Ryan K. Yates	Federal: Civil Disorder; Entering ... in a Restricted Building or Grounds; Disorderly ... in a Restricted Building or Grounds; Disorderly Conduct on Capital Grounds; Parading ... in Capitol Building	Yates pleaded Guilty to one charge: Civil Disorder. The other charges are dismissed.	Sentenced on 6/12/2024 to 6 Months of Incarceration; 24 Months of Supervised Release; 3 Months of Home Detention; Special Assessment of $100; Restitution of $2,000.	Yates received a full pardon on January 20, 2025
June 14, 2023	Andrew Michael Yavoich	Federal: Entering ... in a Restricted Building or Grounds; Disorderly ... in a Restricted Building or Grounds; Disorderly Conduct in a Capitol Building or Grounds; Parading ... in a Capitol Building	Yavoich pleaded Guilty to Parading ... in a Capitol Building. The other charges are dismissed.	Sentenced on 9/13/2023 to 6 months probation; 60 hours of community service; $10 special assessment; $500 restitution. On 11/30/2023 the court grants the motion for Early Termination of Probation and his probation is terminated.	Yavoich received a full pardon on January 20, 2025
May 3, 2021	Elijah Yazdani	Federal: Entering ... in a Restricted Building; Disorderly ... in a Restricted Building; Violent Entry and Disorderly Conduct in a Capitol Building; Parading ... in a Capitol Building	Yazdani pleaded Guilty to one charge: Parading ... in a Capitol Building. The other charges are dismissed.	Sentenced on 11/10/2022 to 14 days incarceration; 24 months probation; $10 special assessment; $500 restitution; 100 hours of community service.	Yazdani received a full pardon on January 20, 2025
February 23, 2022	Abigail Yazdani-Isfehani	Federal: Entering ... in a Restricted Building or Grounds; Disorderly ... in a Restricted Building or Grounds; Disorderly Conduct in a Capitol Building; Parading ... in a Capitol Building	Abigail Yazdani-Isfehani pleaded Guilty to one charge: Parading ... in a Capitol Building. The other charges are dismissed.	Sentenced on 11/10/2022 to 24 months probation; $10 special assessment; $500 restitution; 100 hours of community service.	Yazdani-Isfehani received a full pardon on January 20, 2025
February 23, 2022	Loruhamah Yazdani-Isfehani	Federal: Entering ... in a Restricted Building or Grounds; Disorderly ... in a Restricted Building or Grounds; Disorderly Conduct in a Capitol Building; Parading ... in a Capitol Building	Loruhamah Yazdani-Isfehani pleaded Guilty to one charge: Parading ... in a Capitol Building. The other charges are dismissed.	Sentenced on 11/10/2022 to 24 months probation; $10 special assessment; $500 restitution; 100 hours of community service.	Yazdani-Isfehani received a full pardon on January 20, 2025
November 10, 2023	Gregory C. Yetman	Federal: Civil Disorder; Assaulting ... Certain Officers Using a Dangerous Weapon; Entering ... in a Restricted Building or Grounds with a Deadly or Dangerous Weapon; Disorderly ... in a Restricted Building or Grounds with a Deadly or Dangerous Weapon; Engaging in Physical Violence in a Restricted Building or Grounds with a Deadly or Dangerous Weapon; Act of Physical Violence in the Capitol Grounds or Buildings	Yetman pleaded Guilty to one charge: Assaulting ... Certain Officers with physical contact and with the intent to commit another felony, a lesser offense of Count 2 in the Indictment. The other charges are dismissed.	Sentenced on 7/23/2024 to 30 months incarceration; 18 months of Supervised Release; $100 Special Assessment; Restitution of $2,000.	Yetman received a full pardon on January 20, 2025
August 4, 2021	Isaac Samuel Yoder	Federal: Entering ... in a Restricted Building or Grounds; Disorderly ... in a Restricted Building or Grounds; Disorderly Conduct in a Capitol Building; Parading ... in a Capitol Building	Yoder pleaded Not Guilty to all charges. Found Guilty on all charges in a Bench trial on 5/26/2023.	Sentenced on 8/25/2023 to 12 months incarceration; 12 months supervised release; special assessment of $70; a fine of $1,000; restitution of $500.	Yoder received a full pardon on January 20, 2025
June 23, 2023	Cindy Young	Federal: Entering ... in a Restricted Building or Grounds; Disorderly ... in a Restricted Building or Grounds; Disorderly Conduct in a Restricted Building or Grounds; Parading ... in any of the Capitol Buildings	Young pleaded Not Guilty to all charges. On 8/9/2024, found Guilty on all charges in a Jury trial.	Sentenced on 11/21/2024 to 4 months of incarceration; 60 days location monitoring; 12 months of Supervised Release; $70 Special Assessment; $500 restitution; $4,000 fine. Young received a full pardon on January 20, 2025. On 1/23/2025, the court ordered that Defendant need not surrender to the Bureau of Prisons to serve the sentence imposed by the Judgment in this case	
February 15, 2021	Graydon Young	Federal: Conspiracy; Obstruction of an Official Proceeding and Aiding and Abetting; Destruction of Government Property and Aiding and Abetting; Entering ... in a Restricted Building or Grounds; Tampering with Documents or Proceedings	Young pleaded guilty to Conspiracy and Obstruction of An Official Proceeding. The other charges are dismissed.	Sentenced on 11/22/2024 to 36 months of probation; $200 special assessment; $2,000 restitution.	Young received a full pardon on January 20, 2025
April 14, 2021	Kyle James Young	Federal: Obstruction of an Official Proceeding; Civil Disorder; Assaulting ... Certain Officers; Robbery; Entering ... Restricted Building or Grounds; Disorderly ... Restricted Building or Grounds; Impeding Ingress and Egress in a Restricted Building or Grounds; Engaging in Physical Violence in a Restricted Building or Grounds; Impeding Passage Through the Capitol Grounds or Buildings; Act of Physical Violence in the Capitol Grounds or Buildings	Not Guilty – all charges	Sentenced 9/27/22 to 86 months in prison, three years of supervised release, $2,000 restitution	
August 19, 2021	Philip S. Young	Federal: Assaulting ... Certain Officers; Civil Disorder; Entering ... in a Restricted Building or Grounds; Disorderly ... in a Restricted Building or Grounds; Engaging in Physical Violence in a Restricted Building or Grounds; Disorderly Conduct in a Capitol Building or Grounds; Act of Physical Violence in the Capitol Grounds or Buildings	Young pleaded Guilty to all charges.	Sentenced 1/31/2023 to 8 months of incarceration; 3 years of supervised release; $295 special assessment; $2,000 restitution.	Young received a full pardon on January 20, 2025
July 25, 2023	Joshua Kaleb Youngerman	Federal: Conspiracy to Impede or Injure Officers; Entering ... in a Restricted Building or Grounds; Disorderly ... in a Restricted Building or Grounds; Disorderly Conduct in a Capitol Building or Grounds; Parading ... in a Capitol Building; Stepping, Climbing, Removing, or Injuring Property on Capitol Grounds	Youngerman pleaded Not Guilty to all charges. Jury Trial set to commence on 2/24/2025.	On 1/22/2025, the court grants the government's motion to dismiss the case with prejudice	
June 29, 2021	Darrell Alan Youngers	Federal: Entering ... in any Restricted Building or Grounds; Disorderly ... in a Restricted Building or Grounds; Disorderly Conduct in a Capitol Building; Parading ... in a Capitol Building	Youngers pleaded Guilty to one charge: Parading ... in a Capitol Building. The other charges are dismissed.	Sentenced 9/8/2022 to 36 months of probation, $1,000 fine, $500 restitution; $10 special assessment.	Youngers received a full pardon on January 20, 2025
November 13, 2023	Eric D. Zeis	Federal: Civil Disorder; Entering ... in a Restricted Building or Grounds; Disorderly ... in a Restricted Building or Grounds; Disorderly Conduct in a Capitol Building; Parading ... in a Capitol Building	Zeis pleaded Not Guilty to all charges. Status Conference set for 1/14/2025.	On 1/21/2025, the court grants the government's motion to dismiss the case with prejudice.	
March 15, 2022	Jacob L. Zerkle	Federal: Assaulting ... Certain Officers (3 counts); Civil Disorder; Entering ... in a Restricted Building or Grounds; Disorderly ... in a Restricted Building or Grounds; Engaging in Physical Violence in a Restricted Building or Grounds; Act of Physical Violence in the Capitol Grounds or Buildings	Zerkle pleaded Guilty to two charges: Assaulting ... Certain Officers; and Civil Disorder. The other charges are dismissed.	Sentenced on 2/22/2024 to 24 months incarceration; 36 months of supervised release; 200 hours of community service; $200 special assessment; $2,000 restitution.	Zerkle received a full pardon on January 20, 2025
February 4, 2021	Ryan Scott Zink	Federal: Obstruction of an Official Proceeding; Entering or Remaining in a Restricted Building or Grounds; Disorderly ... in a Restricted Building or Grounds	Zink pleaded Not Guilty to all charges. Found Guilty in a Jury trial on all charges. The court dismisses the Obstruction conviction on 8/9/2024.	Sentenced on 9/20/2024 to 3 months incarceration; 12 months supervised release; $50 special assessment; $500 restitution; 50 hours of community service.	Zink received a full pardon on January 20, 2025
May 13, 2021	Joseph Elliott Zlab	Federal: Entering ... in a Restricted Building or Grounds; Disorderly ... in a Restricted Building or Grounds; Entering ... in Certain Rooms in the Capitol Building; Disorderly Conduct in a Capitol Building; Parading ... in a Capitol Building	Zlab pleaded Guilty to one charge: Parading ... in a Capitol Building. The other charges are dismissed.	Sentenced 4/1/2022 to 36 months probation; 200 hours community service; $5,000 fine; $500 restitution; $10 special assessment.	Zlab received a full pardon on January 20, 2025
February 22, 2022	Athanasios Zoyganeles	Federal: Entering ... in a Restricted Building or Grounds; Disorderly ... in a Restricted Building or Grounds; Disorderly Conduct in a Capitol Building; Parading ... in a Capitol Building	Zoyganeles pleaded Guilty to one charge: Parading ... in a Capitol Building. The other charges are dismissed.	Sentenced on 9/26/2023 to 9 months Probation; 10 days incarceration; $10 Special Assessment; Restitution of $500.	Zoyganeles received a full pardon on January 20, 2025

== See also ==
- Criminal proceedings in the January 6 United States Capitol attack
