= Christopher Worrell =

Christopher Worrell may refer to:

- Christopher John Worrell (born 1970 or 1971), a far right-wing American felon and former fugitive who took part in the January 6 United States Capitol attack
- Christopher Robin Worell, one of the 1976–1977 Troro murderers
- Christopher Worrell (politician), an American local politician in the Massachusetts House of Representatives
- Chris Worrell (golfer), golfer who won the 2013 Oklahoma Open as an amateur
