= Worrell New Testament =

1904 biblical translation

Worrell New Testament: A. S. Worrell's translation with study notes
- Full name: The New Testament, revised and translated by A. S. Worrell, A.M. With Notes and Instructions designed to aid the earnest Reader in obtaining a clear Understanding of the doctrines, Ordinances, and primitive Assemblies as revealed in these Scriptures
- NT published: 1904
- Derived from: Westcott & Hort Greek Text as modified by Scrivener
- Textual basis: NT: Westcott & Hort Greek text as modified by Scrivener
- Translation type: Formal Equivalence
- Copyright: Copyright 1904, 1907, 1957, 1980 Gospel Publishing House
- John 3:16 For God so loved the world, that He gave His only begotten Son, that every one who believes on Him should not perish, but have eternal life;

The Worrell New Testament: A. S. Worrell's translation with study notes is a modern translation of the New Testament published by Gospel Publishing House.

The Worrell New Testament was published in three stages:

- The New Testament, revised and translated by A. S. Worrell, A.M. With Notes and Instructions designed to aid the earnest Reader in obtaining a clear Understanding of the doctrines, Ordinances, and primitive Assemblies as revealed in these Scriptures; 1904
- The New Testament Revised and Translated; American Baptist Publication Society, Judson Press, 1907
- The Worrell New Testament: A. S. Worrell's translation with study notes; Gospel Publishing House, 1980

== Influences ==
Worrell was brought up as a Landmark Baptist, but later in life converted to Pentecostalism. His translation reflects both traditions.

A. S. Worrell sought to update the accuracy and grammar of the King James Version in his translation of the New Testament and included his personal study notes in it as well.

Worrell introduced the work as follows:

This translation is the outgrowth of a solemn conviction that such a work was required of the writer by Him Whose he is, and Whom he seeks to serve. The translator, A. S. Worrell, spent two and one-half years devoted to the work. It was done with the view of pleasing the Supreme Critic, at Whose judgment bar he will have to account for the manner in which he has handled His word.

The work was begun and prosecuted under the distinct conviction that these New Testament Scriptures are the veritable word of God – His last revelation to this sin-cursed world. The translator believed that these Scriptures contain nothing but "live matter"; and that they are as true now and as applicable to man's needs as a tripartite being as they ever were.

Absolute perfection is not claimed for this work, but there is confidence that there are many improvements that the intelligent reader will not fail to recognize. Some such examples are as follows: capitalization of the initial letter of every pronoun referring to deity, restriction of the solemn form of the pronouns and verbs to Deity alone, use of quotation marks to enclose a direct quotation, use of pronouns differently from the usual translation, and the clipping of uns from the preposition unto.

This work claims greater fidelity to the original Greek – especially in the words baptidzo and ecclesia. If these two words had been translated instead of transferred, many divisions in Christendom could have been avoided. The Greek text of Westcott and Hort, as modified by Scrivener and others, was used in the preparation of this work. The italic words have no word answering to them in the Greek text, but are often understood or implied.

== Samples ==
John 3:5–8: Jesus answered, "Verily, verily, I say to you, unless one be born of water and of the Spirit, he cannot enter into the Kingdom of God. That which has been born of the flesh is flesh: and that which has been born of the Spirit is spirit. Marvel not that I said to you, ye must be born anew. The Spirit breatheth where He willeth; and you hear His voice, but know not whence He cometh, or whither He goeth: so is every one who has been born of the Spirit."

John 3:16–17: For God so loved the world, that He gave His only begotten Son, that every one who believes on Him should not perish, but have eternal life; for God sent not His Son into the world to judge the world, but that the world may be saved through Him.
