= Christopher John Worrell =

American convicted felon (born 1971)

- Born: June 26, 1971 (age 55)
- Known for: Participation in the January 6 United States Capitol attack
- Status: Released (pardoned)
- Penalty: 10 years in prison

Christopher John Worrell (born June 26, 1971) is an American convicted felon and former fugitive who took part in the January 6 United States Capitol attack, for which he was sentenced to 10 years in prison.

On January 20, 2025, after beginning his second term in office, President Trump issued pardons to roughly 1,500 individuals charged with crimes connected to January 6, including Worrell.

== Biography ==
Worrell was born on June 26, 1971, in New York, and lives in Naples, Florida. He has a Non-Hodgkin’s lymphoma diagnosis. He is a member of the Proud Boys extremist group.

Worrell was arrested in March 2021 and charged with "entering restricted property or grounds." Worrell was found guilty of assaulting police officers with a weapon at an October 2021 trial. During the trial, Worrell denied using pepper spray on police officers.

While in jail, he broke a finger and contracted COVID-19. Worrell became the focus of attention at the 2021 Justice for J6 rally where right-wing activists complained that Worrell was slow to receive medical care in jail. The District of Columbia Department of Corrections denied the claims. In October 2021, judge Royce Lamberth upheld a civil rights complaint that the District of Columbia Department of Corrections were too slow to provide the court with Worrell's medical records.

In November 2021, Worrell was released from jail and was under house arrest.

On May 15, 2023, Worrell was found guilty on all charges by U.S. District Judge Royce Lamberth.

His failure to attend court delayed a planned sentencing hearing, scheduled for August 15, 2023. An arrest warrant for Worrell was issued the same day. One week later, the FBI continued to seek public support in their search for Worrell. Worrell was arrested six weeks later, on September 28, 2023. The Justice Department issued a statement saying "Worrell triggered a manhunt and enormous waste of government resources. The FBI and the U.S. Attorney's Office spent six weeks tracking Worrell, obtaining multiple warrants, many subpoenas, and other legal processes, all while sending leads throughout the country — from New York to South Carolina to Texas to California to Oregon — to track down tips about his location".

On January 4, 2024, federal judge Royce Lamberth sentenced Worrell to 10 years in prison.

On January 20, 2025, after beginning his second term in office, President Trump issued pardons to Worrell and roughly 1,500 other individuals charged with crimes connected to January 6.

== See also ==
- List of cases of the January 6 United States Capitol attack (T-Z)
- Criminal proceedings in the January 6 United States Capitol attack
- List of people granted executive clemency in the second Trump presidency
