= John Worrall (criminologist) =

John Lampert Worrall is a professor of criminology at the University of Texas at Dallas's School of Economic, Political and Policy Sciences. He is known for his research on crime control, policing, and criminal courts. He is the editor-in-chief of Police Quarterly.

== Education and career ==
Worrall received his B.A. from Central Washington University and his M.A. and Ph.D. from Washington State University. He was formerly a professor at California State University, San Bernardino before joining the faculty of UT-Dallas. He is a member of both the Academy of Criminal Justice Sciences and the American Society of Criminology.

== Selected publications ==
- Worrall, John L. (1 September 1999). "Public perceptions of police efficacy and image: The "fuzziness" of support for the police". American Journal of Criminal Justice. 24 (1): 47–66. doi:10.1007/BF02887617. ISSN 1936-1351.
- Morris, Robert G.; Worrall, John L. (1 October 2014). "Prison Architecture and Inmate Misconduct: A Multilevel Assessment". Crime & Delinquency. 60 (7): 1083–1109. doi:10.1177/0011128710386204.
- Worrall, John L.; Morris, Robert G. (1 September 2012). "Prison gang integration and inmate violence". Journal of Criminal Justice. 40 (5): 425–432. doi:10.1016/j.jcrimjus.2012.06.002. ISSN 0047-2352.
- Bishopp, Stephen A; Piquero, Nicole Leeper; Worrall, John L; Piquero, Alex R (3 June 2019). "Negative Affective Responses to Stress among Urban Police Officers: A General Strain Theory Approach". Deviant Behavior. 40 (6): 635–654. doi:10.1080/01639625.2018.1436568. hdl:10072/390666.
- Worrall, John L.; Morris, Robert G. (1 June 2011). "Inmate Custody Levels and Prison Rule Violations". The Prison Journal. 91 (2): 131–157. doi:10.1177/0032885511404380. ISSN 0032-8855.
- Belvedere, Kimberly; Worrall, John L.; Tibbetts, Stephen G. (1 May 2005). "Explaining Suspect Resistance in Police-Citizen Encounters". Criminal Justice Review. 30 (1): 30–44. doi:10.1177/0734016805275675. ISSN 0734-0168.
- Worrall, John L (1 May 2001). "Addicted to the drug war: The role of civil asset forfeiture as a budgetary necessity in contemporary law enforcement". Journal of Criminal Justice. 29 (3): 171–187. doi:10.1016/S0047-2352(01)00082-4. ISSN 0047-2352.
- Worrall, John L.; Kovandzic, Tomislav V. (2007). "Cops Grants and Crime Revisited". Criminology. 45 (1): 159–190. doi:10.1111/j.1745-9125.2007.00075.x. ISSN 1745-9125.
- Worrall, John L.; Kovandzic, Tomislav V. (1 May 2010). "Police levels and crime rates: An instrumental variables approach". Social Science Research. 39 (3): 506–516. doi:10.1016/j.ssresearch.2010.02.001. ISSN 0049-089X.
- Worrall, John L. (1 November 2000). "In defense of the "quantoids": More on the reasons for the quantitative emphasis in criminal justice education and research". Journal of Criminal Justice Education. 11 (2): 353–361. doi:10.1080/10511250000084971. ISSN 1051-1253.
