= Worrell (disambiguation) =

Worrell is a surname.

Worrell or Worrall can also refer to:

- Worrell 1000, a 1,000-mile beach catamaran race between South Beach, Florida, and Virginia Beach, Virginia
- Worrell New Testament, a translation of the New Testament
- Worrell Street, a street in the Clapham neighborhood of Gloucester, England, U.K.
- Worrall Covered Bridge, a bridge in Rockingham, Vermont, U.S.
- Worrell Mill Swamp, a tributary of the Meherrin River in North Carolina state, U.S.
