= John Worrall =

John Worrall may refer to:

- Jack Worrall (1861–1937), Australian rules footballer
- John Worrall (cricketer) (1927–2012), New Zealand cricketer
- John Worrall (philosopher) (born 1946), professor of philosophy of science at the London School of Economics
- John Worrall (RAF officer) (1911–1988), World War II RAF fighter pilot
- John Worrall (criminologist), American criminologist
