= Frank Worrall =

British journalist

Frank Worrall is a British journalist and author.

He was born in Radcliffe, Greater Manchester, and attended Hulme Grammar School, Oldham. He later studied English literature at Sheffield University, before moving to London to work for The Sun, The Sunday Times and Mail on Sunday. He is also the author of 14 books on sport, including the bestselling Roy Keane: Red Man Walking, Rooney, Celtic United and Lewis Hamilton: The Biography.

In the 1980s he was working in music journalism.

In 2012, Worrall published his first novel, Elvis Has Left The Building, with the backing of the Arts Council of England and Wales.

== Bibliography ==
- Roy Keane: Red Man Walking
- Rooney: Simply Red
- Celtic United
- Lewis Hamilton: The Biography
- Rooney: Wayne's World
- The Magnificent Sevens
- Big Phil: The Biography of Luiz Felipe Scolari
- Nemanja Vidic: The Biography
- Ryan Giggs: Giggsy...The Biography
- Walking In A Fergie Wonderland...The Biography of Sir Alex Ferguson
- Gareth Bale: The Biography
- Rory McIlroy: The Biography
- Chicharito: The Biography
- Elvis Has Left The Building (Novel)
- Mario Balotelli: Why Always Me? The Biography
- Luis Suarez...The Biography
- Rickie Fowler...The Biography
- Jamie Vardy...The Boy from Nowhere
- Harry Kane...The Biography
