= Ernest Worrall =

English painter and teachee (1898–1972)

Ernest Worrall (1898 – 1972) was an English painter and teacher. Born in London, he served in World War I and graduated from the Royal College of Art before moving to Grimsby. He is remembered for a series of paintings depicting the impact of World War II on the town. His work was exhibited in the Royal Academy fourteen times, and has more recently been displayed in the National Memorial Arboretum in Lichfield in response to a successful exhibition in a centre in Cleethorpes.

== Biography ==
Worrall was born in London in 1898. He served as a machine gunner during World War I. Having been captured by German forces in 1917, he escaped in the following year prior to the end of the war. In 1931, he graduated from the Royal College of Art. He moved to Grimsby in 1932, working as a teacher at Wintringham Grammar School.

During World War II, Worrall was a member of the Home Guard. In 1943, he was commissioned by Grimsby Borough Council to record the impact of the conflict on the town in paintings. In 1943 and 1944, he created a series of over 20 works depicting a range of scenes in Grimsby.

Worrall continued to teach at Wintringham after the war, retiring in the 1960s. He died in 1972.

== Personal life ==
Ernest Worrall was the oldest of seven children. He married Mollie Wood in 1932, shortly before moving to Grimsby. After his retirement he moved to Sussex, where he died in 1972. He had a son, Richard Worrall, who in 2009 helped to organise an exhibition of his father's work at the National Memorial Arboretum.

== Exhibitions ==
Worrall's work was exhibited at the Royal Academy on 14 occasions during his life. Of the 22 works he painted during World War II, 18 are now owned by the local council and four by the Imperial War Museum.

In October 2008, a free exhibition of Worrall's wartime paintings, titled Grimsby at War: The Works of Ernest Worrall, was opened at the Cleethorpes Discovery Centre, with an intended closing date of 30 November. It became the most popular exhibition ever to be displayed at the centre, attracting over 2,500 visitors, and was extended to run until 4 January 2009. Later in 2009, Worrall's son Richard, who saw the pictures for the first time at the Cleethorpes exhibition, helped to arrange another display of the paintings, at the National Memorial Arboretum in Alrewas in Staffordshire.
