= Harry Worrall =

English footballer

Personal information
- Full name: Harold Worrall
- Date of birth: 19 November 1918
- Place of birth: Winsford, Cheshire, England
- Date of death: 5 December 1979 (aged 61)
- Place of death: North Tyneside, Tyne and Wear, England
- Position: Left-back

Youth career
- ?–1937: Winsford United

Senior career*
Years	Team	Apps	(Gls)
1937–1948	Manchester United	6	(0)
1948–1949	Swindon Town	0	(0)
- * Club domestic league appearances and goals

Harold "Harry" Worrall (19 November 1918 – 1979) was an English footballer who played as a left back for Manchester United and Swindon Town in the late 1940s.

== Career ==
Born in Winsford Cheshire, Worrall began his football career as an inside forward with Winsford United, before joining Manchester United as an 18-year-old in 1937, where he was converted into a full back. However, his first-team break through was delayed by the outbreak of the Second World War in 1939. He was re-registered as a Manchester United player in April 1946, and made his debut for the club on 30 November 1946, playing at right back in a 3–2 away defeat to Wolverhampton Wanderers. Worrall's next appearance for the club came nearly a year later, when he made the first of five consecutive appearances at home to Aston Villa on 25 October 1947.

Despite this run in the team, though, Worrall failed to oust John Aston as the club's first choice left back and he was sold to Swindon Town for £1,000 in June 1948. However, he was unable to break into the Swindon team either and retired from football in July 1949.
