= Madeleine Worrall =

British actress (born 1977)

- Born: 1977 (age 48–49); Edinburgh, Lothian, Scotland, UK
- Occupation: Actress

Madeleine Worrall (born 1977) is a Scottish actress. She has worked extensively on stage, in London and across Britain.

== Life and career ==
Born in Edinburgh and educated at the Mary Erskine School there, Worrall was a member of the National Youth Music Theatre (1994). She studied history of Art at the University of Cambridge from 1995 to 1998 and at the London Academy of Music and Dramatic Art (LAMDA) in 2000.

In 2003 she played Irina in Michael Blakemore's Three Sisters with Kristin Scott Thomas and Kate Burton in the West End. She appeared as Sonya in John Byrne's Uncle Vanya with Brian Cox for the Royal Lyceum, and as Cinderella in Stephen Fry's original version for the Old Vic in London, for which she was listed as giving one of the five best stage performances of 2007, alongside Frances de la Tour, Kelly Reilly, Tamsin Greig and Kate Fleetwood. She has also acted in Peter Pan, The Lady from the Sea, Good, The Strange Undoing of Prudencia Hart, Gone With the Wind, Three Sisters, Twelfth Night, The Tempest, and has worked extensively with director Lucy Bailey.

In 2014 she began performing the title role in a stage version of Charlotte Brontë's novel Jane Eyre at the Royal National Theatre. In 2015 a performance was live-screened to 650 cinemas across the UK.

Her first short film, a one-minute documentary, was shortlisted to the final ten for the Friends of the Earth short film competition, and her first poems were published by Agenda. Her first album of folk songs, recorded with the Green House Band, received positive reviews from the folk and roots press, including Mojo.

She also appeared as Melanie in Bunny and the Bull, premiered at the 2009 London Film Festival, and as a guest artist in many British television series, including Midsomer Murders, Endeavour, Judge John Deed, Doctors, Ultimate Force, Heartbeat and Foyle's War, alongside David Tennant.

She appeared in the 2014 comedy film Paddington.

== Filmography ==
=== Film ===
Year	Title	Role	Notes
2004	Stage Beauty	Emilia	
2009	Bunny and the Bull	Melanie	
2014	Paddington	The Explorer's Wife	
2015	Mr. Holmes	Haunted Woman	
2016	The Huntsman: Winter's War	Eric's Mother	
2018	Mari	Lauren	

=== Television ===
Year	Title	Role	Notes
2001	Judge John Deed	Kate Rankin	Season 1, episode 4 "Hidden Agenda"
2002	Ultimate Force	Lorraine	season 1, episode 2 "Just a target"
2002	Foyle's War	Florence Beale	Season 1, episode 3 "A Lesson in Murder”
2010	Doctors	Rebecca Kent	Episode "Rebecca's Dream"
2018	Clique	Agnes	Series II
2021	Call the Midwife	Blanche Dellow	
2022	Karen Pirie	Mary Grat Junior	
2024	We Were the Lucky Ones	Gustava Tatar, Bella's mother	
