= George Worrall =

English footballer, manager, and secretary

Personal information
- Date of birth: 1855
- Place of birth: Wolverhampton, England
- Date of death: 1930 (aged 74–75)
- Place of death: Wolverhampton, England

Senior career*
Years	Team	Apps	(Gls)
1877–1885	Wolverhampton Wanderers	-	(-)

Managerial career
- 1877–1885: Wolverhampton Wanderers
- * Club domestic league appearances and goals

George Worrall (1855–1930) was an English football player who served as the first secretary-manager of Wolverhampton Wanderers. He held many roles at the club from its formation in 1877 until 1885, including player, team manager, club secretary and committee member.

He left the club in April 1885 and died in 1930.
