= Rachel Powell =

American Capitol rioter (born 1980)

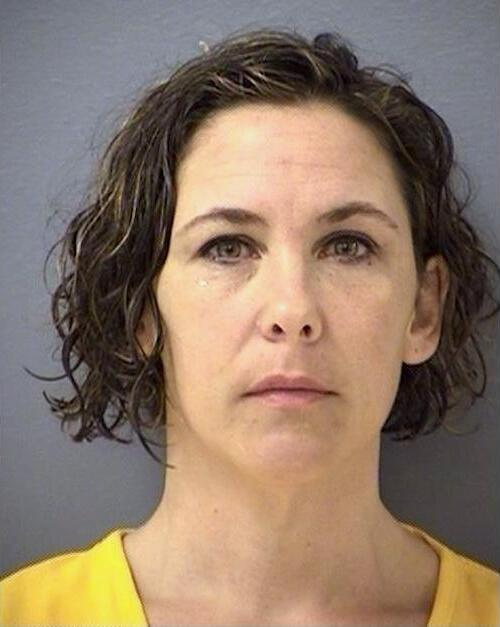
- Powell at the time of her arrest in 2021
- Born: March 26, 1980 (age 46); Anaheim, California, U.S.
- Other names: Pink Hat Lady; Bullhorn Lady
- Known for: Participation in the January 6 United States Capitol attack
- Children: 8
- Status: Released after serving one year (pardoned)
- Penalty: 57 months in prison; 36 months of supervised release

Details
- Imprisoned at: Federal Correctional Institution, Hazelton (2024); D.C. Jail (2025)
- Website: rachelpowell.org

Rachel Marie Powell (born March 26, 1980), also known as "Pink Hat Lady" and "Bullhorn Lady", is an American convicted felon known for her participation in the January 6 United States Capitol attack, in which she wore a pink hat and used a bullhorn to instruct and encourage other rioters.

On July 18, 2023, Powell was found guilty on nine counts, comprising three felonies and six misdemeanors. On October 17, 2023, she was sentenced to 57 months in prison followed by 36 months of supervised release. Powell began serving her sentence at the Federal Correctional Institution, Hazelton, on January 9, 2024.

On January 20, 2025, the first day of the second presidency of Donald Trump, Powell was given a federal pardon, along with nearly every other participant in the Capitol riot, as part of Trump's pardon of January 6 United States Capitol attack defendants. She was released from the D.C. Jail, a correctional facility in Washington, D.C., the following day.

== Biography ==
Powell was born in Anaheim, California, and raised in Fresno. At the time of the Capitol attack, Powell was a 40-year-old single mother of eight residing in Mercer County, Pennsylvania, who homeschooled her children. Powell gave birth to her first child at the age of 16 and married at age 20.

In an interview with The New Yorker, which was conducted while she was being sought by law enforcement, Powell stated that she was initially critical of Donald Trump and did not vote in 2016, though voted for him in the 2020 United States presidential election. Summarizing her political views during the same interview, Powell stated: "My views kind of fall all over the place. I guess you could say that I'm more libertarian at heart."

Powell posted misinformation about the 2020 election and COVID-19 on Facebook; in October 2020, she posted a message on the site stating that she agreed "with the possibility of civil war happening", adding that "the only way this is probably capable of being fixed is bloodshed". She used a bullhorn to protest face masks, stay-at-home orders, and closures of non-essential businesses.

Prosecutors alleged that Powell had become obsessed with keeping Trump in power following his loss in the 2020 election and had conducted surveillance at a female legislator's house.

=== January 6 United States Capitol attack ===
On January 6, 2021, Powell participated in the January 6 United States Capitol attack in Washington, D.C., an unsuccessful attempt to prevent the 2021 United States Electoral College vote count certifying Joe Biden's victory in the 2020 presidential election. During the riot, Powell entered a restricted section of the United States Capitol carrying an ice axe, as well as a cardboard pipe she and several others used as a battering ram. Powell wore a pink hat and used a bullhorn to instruct and encourage other rioters, causing her to become known as "Pink Hat Lady" and "Bullhorn Lady". She also destroyed a window, causing more than $1,000 in damage. In an interview, Powell claimed that she broke the window only "so that people had somewhere to go".

Powell was identified by Sedition Hunters, an online community of open-source intelligence investigators who identified hundreds of participants in the Capitol attack. She was arrested by the Federal Bureau of Investigation (FBI) on February 4, 2021, after turning herself in at a local office in New Castle, Pennsylvania. On the same day, Powell's home in Sandy Lake, Pennsylvania, was raided by the FBI. While searching Powell's house, agents found several smashed cell phones and two "go bags"; one contained ammunition, rope, and duct tape, while the other contained throwing stars, knives, and lighters. Additionally, a bag found in Powell's car contained a tarp, zip ties, and two loaded magazines for an AK-47 rifle. All of Powell's weapons were confiscated, and she was placed under house arrest.

U.S. District Judge Royce Lamberth allowed Powell to be released on bail on the condition that she wear a face mask to prevent the spread of COVID-19, which she later violated by wearing a mesh mask. After being placed on home detention, Powell quit her job at a bookstore, sold her farmhouse to cover legal fees, and moved with her four youngest children into her then-boyfriend's cabin in the outskirts of Grove City, Pennsylvania, being hired to help manage his consulting business.

On April 5, 2023, a federal grand jury indicted Powell on nine counts, comprising three felonies and six misdemeanors. On July 18, 2023, following a bench trial, Lamberth found Powell found guilty of all charges, which included civil disorder, obstructing an official proceeding, destruction of government property, and disorderly conduct.

==== Sentencing ====
Federal prosecutors recommended a sentence of eight years in prison for Powell, describing her as a "leading participant in the most violent insurrection to occur at the U.S. Capitol in over 200 years". Powell's attorney argued against jail time, pointing to her lack of a criminal record and the fact that she had not physically harmed anyone during the riot.

Powell rejected a plea deal offered by prosecutors, which included a four-year prison sentence without the right of appeal and admitted to the charge of obstruction of justice.

On October 17, 2023, Powell was sentenced to 57 months in prison and 36 months of supervised release. She was also ordered to pay more than $8,000 in restitution, fines, and fees.

The day prior to starting her sentence, Powell told CNN: "I don't have remorse for attending protests; I don't have remorse for speaking out and saying that I believe that the election is stolen. I do have remorse for breaking a window and destroying my whole family's life, and for thinking irrationally."

==== Incarceration ====
Powell began serving her sentence at the Federal Correctional Institution, Hazelton, on January 9, 2024, three days after the third anniversary of the Capitol riot.

Powell appealed her sentence; a resentencing date was set for January 6, 2025, the fourth anniversary of the Capitol riot, though was delayed due to weather.

==== Release ====
On January 20, 2025, the first day of his second presidency, Trump pardoned Powell along with almost every other participant in the Capitol riot. She was released from the D.C. Jail, a correctional facility in Washington, D.C., the following day. Upon her release, Powell expressed regret for the violence on January 6, stating: "I feel like a fool because I walked into something unexpected. That doesn't excuse my behavior that day, but I can't go back. I can only go forward. Let's go forward as a country and heal."

=== Other activity ===
On December 28, 2023, Powell posted a tweet that included a photo of her wearing an ankle monitor. The tweet, in which Powell complained about her prison sentence, was criticized by other Twitter users.

== See also ==
- Adam Christian Johnson, Capitol rioter known as "Lectern Guy" or "Podium Guy"
- List of cases of the January 6 United States Capitol attack
- Criminal proceedings in the January 6 United States Capitol attack
- List of people granted executive clemency in the second Trump presidency
- List of people pardoned or granted clemency by the president of the United States
