= Peter Schwartz (Capitol rioter) =

American convicted felon

- Born: Peter J. Schwartz; 1973 or 1974 (age 52–53)
- Occupation: Traveling welder
- Known for: Participation in the January 6 United States Capitol attack
- Status: Pardoned
- Penalty: 170 months in prison; 36 months of supervised release; $2,000 in restitution

Details
- Imprisoned at: United States Penitentiary, Canaan

Peter J. Schwartz is an American convicted felon known for his participation in the January 6 United States Capitol attack, as well as being one of the first Capitol attack defendants to be convicted of assaulting police officers with pepper spray. On December 6, 2022, he was convicted of eleven charges—nine felonies and two misdemeanors—including four felony counts of assaulting, resisting, or impeding law enforcement officers using a dangerous weapon.

On May 5, 2023, Schwartz was sentenced to more than 14 years in prison for his role in the Capitol riot. He was also ordered to serve three years of supervised release and pay $2,000 in restitution. Schwartz's prison sentence was the longest for any Capitol attack defendant until Stewart Rhodes, the founder and leader of the Oath Keepers, a far-right anti-government militia, was sentenced to 18 years in prison on May 25, 2023.

On January 20, 2025, the first day of the second presidency of Donald Trump, Schwartz received a federal pardon along with nearly every other participant in the Capitol attack as part of Trump's pardon of January 6 United States Capitol attack defendants.

== Biography ==
Schwartz is a native of Owensboro, Kentucky. Prior to his arrest for his participation in the Capitol riot, Schwartz was working as a traveling welder in Uniontown, Pennsylvania.

Schwartz had a lengthy criminal record before the Capitol attack, including 38 felony convictions since 1991, at least 11 of which involved violence or threats of violence. Prosecutors in Schwartz's Capitol riot case described a 1994 disorderly conduct case for throwing a lit cigarette near a woman's eyes, a 2004 case for assault with a deadly weapon, a 2019 case for making terroristic threats against police while being arrested for domestic assault, and a 2020 case for assaulting his then-girlfriend Shelly Stallings, including by biting her on the forehead and punching her multiple times.

In October 2019, Schwartz was sentenced to five years in prison for possessing a handgun as a convicted felon. In April 2020, he was released and sentenced to two years of supervised probation. In January 2021, an arrest warrant was put out for Schwartz due to a probation violation.

According to the Kentucky Department of Corrections, at the time of the Capitol attack, Schwartz was on probation for possessing a gun as a convicted felon, as well as making terroristic threats out of Daviess County, Kentucky.

=== January 6 United States Capitol attack ===
On January 6, 2021, Schwartz participated in the January 6 United States Capitol attack in Washington, D.C., an unsuccessful attempt to prevent the 2021 United States Electoral College vote count certifying Joe Biden's victory in the 2020 United States presidential election. Schwartz's wife, Shelly Stallings, also participated in the riot. During the attack, Schwartz threw a metal folding chair at police officers; he would later tell a friend that he "started a riot" by "throwing the first chair". Schwartz then stole Metropolitan Police Department duffel bags full of pepper spray canisters, which he gave to other rioters, including Stallings. He then began using pepper spray on retreating police officers. Schwartz also showed co-defendant Jeffrey Scott Brown how to use a pepper spray canister, after which Brown dove toward the front of a police line and used pepper spray on them. Schwartz was later seen carrying a wooden baton.

Upon investigation, Federal Bureau of Investigation (FBI) agents discovered a Facebook post from Schwartz on January 7 that read: "All the violence from the left was terrorism. What happened yesterday was the opening of a war. I was there and whether people will acknowledge it or not we are now at war. It would be wise to be ready!" There is no substantive evidence that left-wing extremists were involved in the Capitol attack.

Schwartz was arrested in Uniontown, Pennsylvania, on February 4, 2021. On December 6, 2022, Schwartz was convicted of eleven charges—nine felonies and two misdemeanors—including four felony counts of assaulting, resisting, or impeding law enforcement officers using a dangerous weapon, as well as felony obstructing an official proceeding and misdemeanor disorderly conduct. Schwartz was held without bond until his sentencing.

As recently as February 2023, Schwartz made jailhouse phone calls from a Washington, D.C., jail in which he claimed to have been "entrapped" by the U.S. government and referred to government officials as traitors. Schwartz asked to be tried separately from his co-defendants and requested that his trial be moved, claiming that he could not receive a fair trial in Washington, D.C. Schwartz and his attorney also argued that FBI agents tricked him into handing over his phone. During one interview, Schwartz called his trial "the biggest sham I've ever seen in my life".

==== Sentencing ====
Schwartz faced a maximum prison sentence of 45 years. Federal prosecutors recommended a prison sentence of 294 months (24 years and 6 months) for Schwartz, describing him as "one of the most violent and aggressive participants" in the Capitol attack, as well as someone who "has a long history of assaulting police officers and women". Prosecutors also argued for three years of supervised release and a fine of $71,541, the amount Schwartz had raised from an online fundraiser in which he referred to himself as a political prisoner; they argued that Schwartz should not profit from his participation in the Capitol attack.

This recommended prison sentence was the longest for any Capitol attack defendant, and was more than twice as long as any other recommendation. Schwartz's attorneys requested a prison sentence of four years and six months, stating that his actions were motivated by a "misunderstanding" about the 2020 United States presidential election, the results of which U.S. President Donald Trump and his allies attempted to overturn by promoting baseless conspiracy theories that Democrats stole the election.

On May 5, 2023, U.S. District Judge Amit Mehta sentenced Schwartz to 170 months in prison and 36 months of supervised release, as well as ordering him to pay $2,000 in restitution. Schwartz and two co-defendants—Jeffrey Scott Brown and Markus Maly—were the first Capitol attack defendants to be convicted of assaulting police officers with pepper spray. An attorney for Schwartz stated that they planned to appeal his conviction and sentence. Shortly before Schwartz was pardoned, an appeals court overturned one of his non-assault charges.

At the time, Schwartz's prison sentence was the longest for any defendant in the Capitol attack, surpassing the 10-year prison term given to retired New York City police officer Thomas Webster in September 2022. Schwartz's prison sentence remained the longest for any Capitol attack defendant until Stewart Rhodes, the founder and leader of the far-right anti-government Oath Keepers militia, was sentenced to 18 years in prison on May 25, 2023. By the third anniversary of the Capitol attack, Schwartz's prison sentence remained the longest for any Capitol rioter convicted of assaulting a federal officer. At the time of Trump's blanket pardon of January 6 defendants, Schwartz's prison sentence was the seventh-longest for any defendant, as well as the second-longest for any rioter convicted of assaulting an officer, surpassed only by David Dempsey's 20-year sentence.

===== Shelly Stallings =====
Schwartz's wife, Shelly Stallings, was also charged for her role in the Capitol riot; she was arrested in Owensboro on February 16, 2022. Stallings pleaded guilty to all seven charges in her indictment—five felonies and two misdemeanors—on August 24, 2022. According to Stallings, she lied for Schwartz because she was afraid of him, alleging that Schwartz had beaten her two days before the FBI arrested him, threatened harm to anyone who turned him in to the FBI, and sent as many as 30 messages from jail threatening to kill her if she cooperated. In April 2023, Stallings was sentenced to two years in prison. Since the Capitol riot, Stallings has returned to her hometown in Morgantown, Kentucky, and filed for divorce.

==== Imprisonment ====
As of January 2024, Schwartz was being held in the United States Penitentiary, Canaan, in Canaan Township, Pennsylvania.

==== Pardon ====
On January 20, 2025, the first day of the second presidency of Donald Trump, Schwartz was pardoned along with nearly every other participant in the Capitol attack. One of Schwartz's former girlfriends, a Democrat who voted for Trump three times, stated that Schwartz should not have been pardoned and that she had believed the Trump administration would pardon Capitol attack defendants only on a case-by-case basis.

On September 9, 2026, Schwartz was arrested in Corpus Christi, Texas, and charged with driving with a suspended license, possession of a controlled substance, and unlawful carrying of a weapon.

== See also ==
- List of cases of the January 6 United States Capitol attack
- Criminal proceedings in the January 6 United States Capitol attack
- List of people granted executive clemency in the second Trump presidency
- List of people pardoned or granted clemency by the president of the United States
