= Jason Riddle =

American Capitol rioter

- Born: Jason Daniel Riddle; New Haven, Connecticut, U.S.
- Education: Naugatuck Valley Community College (Associate degree); Southern Connecticut State University (Bachelor's degree)
- Occupations: Restaurant server; Postal worker (formerly); Correctional officer (formerly)
- Known for: Participation in the January 6 United States Capitol attack; Refusing a federal pardon from President Donald Trump
- Political party: Democratic
- Other political affiliations: Republican (formerly)
- Status: Released
- Penalty: 90 days in prison; 3 years of probation; 60 hours of community service; $754 in restitution
- Military career
- Allegiance: United States
- Branch: United States Navy
- Service years: 2006–2010

Jason Daniel Riddle is an American United States Navy veteran and a former supporter of U.S. President Donald Trump known for his participation in the January 6 United States Capitol attack, as well as subsequently refusing a federal pardon from Trump.

During the Capitol riot, Riddle entered the office of the Parliamentarian of the United States Senate, where he stole several items, including a bottle of wine, a book, and a football. He was later arrested and pleaded guilty to his charges, receiving a sentence of 90 days in prison and three years of probation. He was also ordered to pay more than $750 in restitution.

Despite his wishes, Riddle was pardoned, along with nearly every other participant in the Capitol riot, on the first day of the second presidency of Donald Trump. The following day, Riddle sent the United States Department of Justice an email rejecting his pardon.

== Biography ==
Riddle was born in New Haven, Connecticut. He earned an associate degree from Naugatuck Valley Community College in 2014 and a bachelor's degree from Southern Connecticut State University in 2016.

Riddle served in the United States Navy from 2006 to 2010. Prior to the Capitol riot, he was a postal worker and former correctional officer. As of January 2025, Riddle was working as a server at a restaurant in Concord, New Hampshire.

=== January 6 United States Capitol attack ===
On January 6, 2021, Riddle participated in the January 6 United States Capitol attack in Washington, D.C., an unsuccessful attempt to prevent the 2021 United States Electoral College vote count certifying Joe Biden's victory in the 2020 United States presidential election. According to Riddle, he arrived near the Washington Monument around 12:05 p.m. with two friends via Uber. Riddle advanced to the United States Capitol, though both of his friends left to get food. As people begin breaching the Capitol, Riddle stopped on a small grassy patch to the left side of the front of the building, where he remained for approximately half an hour, taking pictures and making phone calls.

Upon seeing Trump flags inside the Capitol, Riddle entered along with numerous others, witnessing rioters destroy items including printers and computers. Riddle walked into the office of the Parliamentarian of the United States Senate, which he stayed in for almost four and a half minutes; during this time, he found an open bottle of wine and poured a glass to drink before being asked by a police officer to leave the office. He remained in the Capitol for around half an hour before leaving. Riddle also took a book belonging to the parliamentarian, which he sold for $40 shortly after exiting the building. Furthermore, Riddle stole a Fox News football from the office, though he tossed it aside as he exited the Capitol.

In an interview with NBC10 Boston, Riddle stated that he "poured a glass of wine and watched it all unfold". He condemned the rioters committing violent acts, stating that "[t]hose psychopaths going around breaking things and hurting people can rot in hell". Riddle also provided photos and videos of himself and other people inside and outside of the Capitol to NBC10 Boston.

On January 22, 2021, Riddle's residence in Keene, New Hampshire, was searched by the Federal Bureau of Investigation (FBI). Riddle agreed to an interview with FBI agents, in which he admitted to deleting some messages, photos, and videos of his trip to D.C. on his phone.

Riddle was arrested in Bedford, New Hampshire, on February 8, 2021. At the time of his arrest, Riddle stated that he was an "obsessor" of U.S. President Donald Trump.

Riddle was charged with knowingly entering a restricted building, violent entry and disorderly conduct on Capitol grounds, and theft of government property. On April 20, 2021, Riddle pleaded not guilty to all charges. On November 18, 2021, he entered a plea agreement, pleading guilty to charges of theft of government property and parading, demonstrating, or picketing in a Capitol building, both misdemeanors. On April 4, 2022, Riddle was sentenced to 90 days in jail followed by three years of probation, including 60 hours of community service, as well as being ordered to pay $754 in restitution. His lawyers had asked for 30 months of probation followed by community service.

After announcing his candidacy for New Hampshire's 2nd congressional district, Riddle wrote an article for The Keene Sentinel in which he apologized to New Hampshire residents for the Capitol attack being unsuccessful, stating: "I'm sorry our insurrection failed, hopefully it goes better next time."

==== Aftermath ====
In an interview with New Hampshire Public Radio, Riddle stated that he stopped supporting Trump shortly after his release from prison, when Trump had been indicted for falsifying business records and encouraged his supporters to protest despite the events of January 6. On the first day of his second presidency, Trump pardoned Riddle, despite the veteran declining one. On January 23, 2025, Riddle sent the United States Department of Justice an email rejecting his pardon.

According to Riddle, he was struggling with alcoholism at the time of the Capitol riot, and part of his probation included mandatory alcoholic treatment. Riddle told ABC News: "I am guilty of the crimes I have committed and accept the consequences. It is thanks to those consequences I now have a happy and fruitful existence." He also expressed resentment toward Trump, stating: "I don't need to obsess over a narcissistic bully to feel better about myself. Trump can shove his pardon up his ass." Riddle further added that both he and Trump deserved to go to prison for their roles in the Capitol attack. The office of Democratic Senator Maggie Hassan reached out to the federal pardon office on Riddle's behalf.

Although Riddle was a Republican, he voted for Kamala Harris in the 2024 United States presidential election and donated to her campaign. Riddle is now a registered Democrat.

In an October 2025 op-ed for the New Hampshire Union Leader, Riddle criticized the second Trump administration, including its targeting of Trump's political opponents. In a November 2025 opinion piece for The Keene Sentinel, Riddle expressed gratitude for Brian Sicknick, a United States Capitol Police officer who was fatally wounded during the Capitol attack, referring to Sicknick as both a hero and an inspiration.

=== Political activity ===
Riddle was an unsuccessful candidate to represent New Hampshire's 2nd congressional district in the United States House of Representatives in 2022 and 2024. He placed ninth in the Republican primary on September 10, 2024, receiving 1.4% of the vote. In a Ballotpedia survey, Riddle described himself as a "recently released January 6th political prisoner" and identified Jesus as his only endorsement. Riddle stated that he intended to run against Democratic incumbent Annie Kuster, initially believing her to be a state representative. Upon being informed that Kuster was actually a member of the United States Congress, Riddle stated: "Oh, well, I guess I have to run for that then." Kuster ultimately did not run for re-election.

== Electoral history ==
=== 2024 ===
2024 New Hampshire's 2nd congressional district Republican primary results
| Party | Candidate | Votes | % |
|---|---|---|---|
| | Lily Williams | 22,040 | 35.6 |
| | Vikram Mansharamani | 16,565 | 26.7 |
| | Bill Hamlen | 9,860 | 15.9 |
| | Paul Wagner | 2,329 | 3.8 |
| | Casey Crane | 2,046 | 3.3 |
| | Randall Clark | 1,866 | 3.0 |
| | William Harvey | 1,743 | 2.8 |
| | Jay Mercer | 1,573 | 2.5 |
| | Jason Riddle | 869 | 1.4 |
| | Robert D'Arcy | 714 | 1.2 |
| | Michael Callis | 632 | 1.0 |
| | Tom Alciere | 623 | 1.0 |
| | Gerald Beloin | 552 | 0.9 |
| | | 533 | 0.9 |
| Total votes | | 61,945 | 100.00 |

== See also ==
- Pamela Hemphill, another Capitol rioter who refused a pardon from Trump
- List of cases of the January 6 United States Capitol attack
- Criminal proceedings in the January 6 United States Capitol attack
- List of people granted executive clemency in the second Trump presidency
- List of people pardoned or granted clemency by the president of the United States
