= Edward Kelley (Capitol rioter) =

American convicted felon

- Born: 1988 or 1989 (age 37–38)
- Known for: Participation in the January 6 United States Capitol attack; Conspiring to murder law enforcement
- Status: Incarcerated
- Penalty: Life imprisonment
- Military career
- Allegiance: United States
- Branch: United States Marine Corps

Edward Kelley is an American convicted felon known for his participation in the January 6 United States Capitol attack, as well as subsequently conspiring to murder dozens of law enforcement personnel involved in investigating his role in the Capitol riot.

On November 8, 2024, Kelley was convicted of eleven counts—three felonies and eight misdemeanors—in connection with the Capitol attack, including civil disorder, destruction of government property, and assaulting, resisting, or impeding certain officers. On November 20 of the same year, Kelley was convicted of conspiracy to murder federal employees, solicitation to commit a crime of violence, and influencing a federal official by threat.

On January 20, 2025, the first day of the second presidency of Donald Trump, Kelley was pardoned along with nearly every other participant in the Capitol attack, though this did not apply to his conspiracy charges. On July 2, 2025, Kelley was sentenced to life in prison.

== Biography ==
At the time of the Capitol attack, Kelley was a United States Marine Corps veteran from Maryville, Tennessee. He had been deployed to Iraq and Afghanistan, serving for eight years before his 2015 discharge. Kelley was an anti-abortion activist.

=== January 6 United States Capitol attack ===
On January 6, 2021, Kelley participated in the January 6 United States Capitol attack in Washington, D.C., an unsuccessful attempt to prevent the 2021 United States Electoral College vote count certifying Joe Biden's victory in the 2020 United States presidential election. During the riot, Kelley, wearing a gas mask, threw a United States Capitol Police (USCP) officer to the ground along with two other rioters. He subsequently pushed and pulled on a metal barricade, eventually pushing past police alongside the crowd. Once outside the Senate Wing Door, Kelley used a piece of wood to smash and enter the window next to the door around 2:13 p.m. He was the fourth rioter to enter the building. Kelley then kicked open the Senate Wing Door while inside the building. As more rioters breached the Capitol, Kelley advanced within the building and confronted USCP officer Eugene Goodman, whom he chased up a flight of stairs. Kelley remained in the building for approximately 40 minutes, exiting via the United States Capitol rotunda at 2:54 p.m.

Kelley was arrested in Knoxville, Tennessee, on May 5, 2022; he was released a week later on a personal recognizance bond. On November 8, 2024, following a two-day bench trial, U.S. District Judge Colleen Kollar-Kotelly acquitted Kelley of obstructing an official proceeding, though convicted him of eleven counts: three felonies—civil disorder, destruction of government property, and assaulting, resisting, or impeding certain officers—as well as eight misdemeanors. Kelley's sentencing was set for April 7, 2025, though he was pardoned on January 20, 2025, the first day of the second presidency of Donald Trump.

=== Subsequent charges ===
On December 16, 2022, Kelley and Austin Carter, a 26-year-old security officer from Knoxville, were both charged with conspiracy, retaliating against a federal official, interstate communication of a threat, and solicitation to commit a crime of violence. Kelley was held without bond until facing trial for these charges.

While awaiting trial for his January 6 charges, Kelley had developed a plan to murder various law enforcement personnel involved in investigating him, including employees of the Federal Bureau of Investigation (FBI), the Tennessee Bureau of Investigation, and the Tennessee Highway Patrol. Kelley created a "kill list" of 37 law enforcement members and distributed it to a co-conspirator, who later pleaded guilty to his role in the conspiracy and testified that he and Kelley had planned attacks on the FBI's field office in Knoxville, Tennessee, using car bombs and incendiary devices attached to drones. The co-conspirator also testified that they had strategized assassinating FBI employees in their homes and in public places. In one recording, Kelley gave instructions to "take out their office" and "recruit as many as you can" in the event of his arrest, stating: "You don't have time to train or coordinate, but every hit has to hurt."

On November 20, 2024, following a three-day trial, Kelley was convicted of conspiracy to murder federal employees, solicitation to commit a crime of violence, and influencing a federal official by threat; the jury required just one hour of deliberation. Kelley's sentencing was set for May 7, 2025. Federal prosecutors sought a sentence of life in prison for Kelley, citing his lack of remorse. Although Kelley argued that Trump's blanket pardon of January 6 defendants also applied to his conspiracy charges, both the United States Department of Justice and U.S. District Judge Thomas A. Varlan ruled against this. Varlan also denied Kelley's motion for a new trial due to insufficient evidence.

On July 2, 2025, Varlan sentenced Kelley to life in prison. His request to be released pending an appeal was denied. Kelley's co-conspirator, Austin Carter, also faced a life sentence, though he accepted a plea agreement with a maximum sentence of 10 years in prison. On August 4, 2025, Carter was sentenced to eight years in prison.

== See also ==
- List of cases of the January 6 United States Capitol attack
- Criminal proceedings in the January 6 United States Capitol attack
- List of people granted executive clemency in the second Trump presidency
- List of people pardoned or granted clemency by the president of the United States
