= Alan Hostetter =

American Capitol rioter

- Occupations: Police chief; yoga instructor
- Known for: Involvement in the January 6 United States Capitol attack
- Penalty: 135 months imprisonment

Alan Hostetter is an American convicted felon, anti-lockdown activist and founder of the American Phoenix Project who took part in the United States Capitol attack on January 6, 2021.

He was sentenced on December 7, 2023, to 11 years and three months in prison, as well as $2,000 in restitution and a fine of $30,000, for four felonies related to the attack.

On January 20, 2025, after beginning his second presidency, Donald Trump issued pardons to roughly 1500 individuals charged with crimes connected to January 6, including Hostetter.

== Career ==
In the 1980s, Hostetter served in the United States Army after graduating from high school, during which time he was deployed to West Germany. He then worked for the Orange County Sheriff's Department in the 1990s and later for the Fontana Police department leaving as a Deputy Chief and becoming police chief of La Habra, California, in 2009. He gave up the position due to spinal problems less than a year later, moved to San Clemente and began a new career as a yoga instructor and sound healer.

== Anti-lockdown protests ==
Following the early 2020 outbreak of the COVID-19 pandemic, Hostetter quickly became involved in protests against Californian lockdown measures. During a protest in late May, he refused to let go of a chain link fence that had been erected to discourage people from parking and congregating near San Clemente Pier, despite police declaring an unlawful assembly. He was eventually arrested after law enforcement cut holes in the fence around his hands, and charged with resisting and obstructing an officer, refusal to disperse, and trespassing. The incident cemented Hostetter as a leader of the movement and was referred to by locals as "Fence-gate".

He went on to lead several protests, and founded the American Phoenix Project, a nonprofit organisation to support these protests, which spent $50,000 on a lawsuit filed by two organizations run by Harmeet Dhillon against the Californian lockdown policies. The lawsuit was later dismissed. Hostetter also attended a protest outside the house of Costa Mesa mayor Katrina Foley and spoke at a QAnon conference. He also became increasingly oppositional to California governor Gavin Newsom, and at a July 2020 rally said that the Founding Fathers would violently overthrow him if they were alive.

== January 6 United States Capitol attack ==
=== Preparations ===
When Joe Biden won the 2020 United States presidential election in November, Hostetter began to campaign against what he saw as a stolen election. He worked with American Phoenix Project director Russ Taylor, communicating with California-based members of the Three Percenters with plans to bring hatchets, guns and body armor to Washington, D.C. for the January 6 Trump rally. In a speech on December 19, 2020, Hostetter made a speech about members of Congress in Washington, D.C., telling the crowd to "choke that city off, fill it with patriots... We either fix this mess and keep America America, or we become traitors, and those five million people outside the walls are gonna drag us out by our hair and tie us to a fucking lamppost. That's their option." Hostetter and Taylor used a Telegram group chat named "California Patriots - Answer the Call Jan. 6" to tell his group to drive to D.C. instead of fly so they could take weapons with them.

On January 5, Hostetter spoke at the Rally to Save America in front of the Supreme Court Building. Alice Butler-Short stated at the event that without Hostetter's sponsorship, they would not have their speaker setup. Hostetter claimed in his speech that "we are at war in this country, we are at war tomorrow."

=== Capitol attack ===
On January 6, Hostetter met up with members of the "DC Brigade" and then attended the "Stop the Steal" rally, but did not go near as he had items the guards would not allow in. He was carrying a hatchet in his backpack, as well as tactical gear, a helmet, knives, stun batons, pepper spray and other gear. He made his way to the Capitol after Donald Trump's speech, and moved with the mob onto the Capitol's West Terrace, where he took a photo with Taylor. He did not enter the building nor assault police officers during the riot, but used a megaphone to encourage the crowd to push through the police line and breach areas of the Capitol.

=== Arrest and trial ===
Hostetter was arrested in California on June 10, 2021, by the Federal Bureau of Investigation five months after the riot. He was indicted alongside five other men; Russell Taylor, Eric Scott Warner, Felipe Antonio Martinez, Derek Kinnison, and Ronald Mele. He was convicted of four felonies including conspiracy to obstruct an official proceeding and entering a restricted area with a deadly or dangerous weapon in an indictment that linked four of his co-defendants with the Three Percenters.

Prosecutors requested a sentence of 151 months for Hostetter, claiming that he was a "terrorist" and that his law enforcement experience meant he should have known better. Taylor, who had pleaded guilty in April 2023 to a conspiracy charge, testified for the government at Hostetter's trial. Hostetter's lawyer was by Bilal Essayli but he represented himself during his closing arguments, during which he made conspiratorial claims that he had been manipulated into participating in the "false flag" riot by government informants and that Taylor had been part of the plot, as well as asserting that the killing of Ashli Babbitt was "staged" when Babbitt's mother was in the courtroom. He praised Republican candidate Vivek Ramaswamy for stating that the riot looked like "an inside job," and downplayed the violence at the Capitol as "basically the equivalent of a three-hour hissy fit."

He was sentenced on December 7, 2023, to 11 years and three months in prison, plus $2,000 in restitution and a fine of $30,000 by judge Royce C. Lamberth. His sentence was just shorter than the 12 years recommended by the Department of Justice. He was expected to be in prison by January 5, 2024. However, on January 20, 2025, after beginning his second term in office, President Trump issued pardons to Hostetter and roughly 1,500 other individuals charged with crimes connected to January 6th.

== See also ==
- List of cases of the January 6 United States Capitol attack (G-L)
- Criminal proceedings in the January 6 United States Capitol attack
- List of people granted executive clemency in the second Trump presidency
