= Federal Correctional Institution, Hazelton =

Medium-security prison in West Virginia, US

- Federal Correctional Institution, Hazelton (West Virginia) Federal Correctional Institution, Hazelton (the United States)
- Location: Preston County, West Virginia; 39.673896°N 79.498826°W
- Status: Operational
- Security class: Medium-security with Secure Female Facility
- Population: 2,015 (April 2024)
- Opened: 2015
- Managed by: Federal Bureau of Prisons
- Warden: Frederick Entzel Jr

The Federal Correctional Institution, Hazelton (FCI Hazelton) is a medium-security United States federal prison for male inmates, as well as a secure facility for female inmates, located in unincorporated Preston County, West Virginia. It is the newest facility in the federal prison system and is operated by the Federal Bureau of Prisons, a division of the United States Department of Justice. The New York Times notes that its nickname is "Misery Mountain".

The Federal Correctional Complex (FCC) Hazelton has two prisons, physically adjacent but distinct: FCI Hazelton and the high-security United States Penitentiary, Hazelton constructed in 2004. Both are operated by the FBOP.

== Facility details ==
FCI Hazelton has a Special Housing Unit where inmates are generally allowed out of their cells only for an hour recreation each weekday as well as for medical appointments. Inmates may be sent to the SHU pending investigations, as punishment for rule violations, for protection from other inmates, or for other administrative reasons.

The facility has a Vocational Training Program, which includes building trades such as Carpentry, Dry Wall, Electrical, HVAC, Masonry, Plumbing, and Welding, Culinary Arts, Graphic Arts, and Microsoft Office.

== Notable inmates ==
Inmate Name	Register Number	Status	Details
Michael Nunn	11772-030	Released from custody on August 22, 2019.	Former world middleweight boxing champion; pleaded guilty in 2003 to conspiracy to distribute cocaine for buying $24,000 worth of cocaine from an undercover FBI Agent in 2002.
Joaquin Valencia-Trujillo	02440-748	Scheduled for release in 2036; currently at FCI Oakdale.	Former leader of the Cali Cartel in Colombia; extradited to the US in 2004; convicted in 2006 of drug trafficking conspiracy for directing the shipment of more than 100 tons of cocaine a year into the US over a ten-year period.
James Alex Fields Jr.	22239-084	Serving a life sentence. Transferred to USP Allenwood.	White supremacist, pleaded guilty in 2019 of 29 federal hate crime charges using his car to harm counter-protestors during the Unite the Right rally in Charlottesville, Virginia, killing 32 year-old Heather Heyer and injuring up to 19 more.
Heather Mack	72776-509	Serving a 26-year sentence; scheduled for release in 2044.	Convicted of being involved with the murder of her mother Sheila von Wiese, during a vacation in Indonesia.
Stella Nickell	17371-086	Serving a 90-year sentence; transferred from FCI Dublin.	Convicted of product tampering after she poisoned Excedrin capsules with lethal cyanide.
Stewart Parnell	96284-020	Serving a 28-year sentence; scheduled for release in 2038.	Former chief executive officer of the Peanut Corporation of America. Convicted of his role in a salmonella outbreak which killed at least 9 people and sickened at least 714 more.
Nancy Salzman	25533-052	Released in March 2024.	Co-founder and "Prefect" of NXIVM, an Albany, New York-based multi-level marketing firm and cult that also engaged in sex trafficking; has been described as enabling fellow co-founder Keith Raniere, who was sentenced to 120 years after his conviction at trial. Pleaded guilty to racketeering conspiracy in September 2021.
Abdul Malik Abdul Kareem	44126-408	Serving a 30-year sentence; scheduled for release in 2041.	Conspirator in the Curtis Culwell Center attack. Knowingly provided the shooters with firearms and ammunition.
Rachel Powell	28873-509	Serving a 57-month sentence; scheduled for release in January 2028 (pardoned 2025)	Rioter who participated in the January 6 United States Capitol attack.
Christian Lee Dedmon	71503-510	Serving a 40 year sentence; scheduled for release in 2057	Rankin County Mississippi Sheriffs Deputy involved in the Rankin County Goon Squad. Held in FCI Hazelton for two months before relocating to FCI Fairton.
Natalie Cochran	15406-088	Serving a 135 month sentence; scheduled for release in 2029. Also serving a Life sentence.	Former pharmacist from West Virginia. Plead guilty to wire fraud and money laundering on September 21, 2020. Also found guilty of murdering her husband and given a life sentence.
Riley Williams	26023-509	Served a 36 month sentence, released in 2024	Participant in the January 6 United States Capitol attack who stole the laptop of Nancy Pelosi.

== See also ==
- List of United States federal prisons
- Federal Bureau of Prisons
- Incarceration in the United States
