= Heather Mack =

American criminal (born 1995)

- Born: Heather Lois Mack; October 11, 1995 (age 30); Illinois, U.S.
- Children: 1
- Parents: James L. Mack (1929–2006); Sheila Ann von Wiese Mack (1952–2014)
- Status: Incarcerated
- Convictions: Indonesia; Accessory to murder United States; Conspiracy to kill a U.S. national
- Penalty: Indonesia; 10 years (released and deported in 2021); United States; 26 years

Details
- Date: August 7, 2014
- Imprisoned at: Federal Correctional Institution, Hazelton

Heather Lois Mack (born October 11, 1995) is an American heiress convicted of murdering her mother, Sheila von Wiese, while on vacation in Bali, Indonesia, in August 2014. The murder was widely publicized internationally because Mack and her boyfriend stuffed von Wiese-Mack's body in a suitcase. She was sentenced to 10 years, of which she served 7. However, in 2021 upon her arrival back to the United States, Mack was arrested on conspiracy and obstruction charges. In June 2023, Mack pleaded guilty to one count of conspiring to kill a U.S. national; the following year she was sentenced to 26 years in prison.

== Personal life ==
Mack was born to jazz musician and composer James L. Mack (November 2, 1929 – August 6, 2006) and Sheila Ann von Wiese (June 10, 1952 – August 12, 2014) in 1995. She attended Oak Park and River Forest High School in Oak Park, Illinois, as did her future co-conspirator, Tommy Schaefer (born July 13, 1993). Mack and her mother reportedly had a contentious relationship, with police reporting that they'd made 86 visits to the home between 2004 and 2013.

=== Death of James L. Mack ===
The Macks went on a Royal Caribbean Mediterranean cruise in 2001. During the trip, James L. Mack suffered a foot injury, for which he did not receive adequate medical treatment from the ship's doctor, resulting in partial paralysis. He filed suit against Royal Caribbean, saying that he was partly paralyzed, and had to urinate in a bottle, but this case took many years to resolve.

In 2004, police were called to the Mack residence over claims that the children from James' previous relationships were denied access to their father by Heather's mother who would turn off the lights and pretend not to be home.

In 2006, the Macks went on a vacation to Greece. During the trip, James L. Mack died in his hotel from a pulmonary embolism, on August 6.

A settlement in the 2001 lawsuit was reached in 2011. After legal fees, $340,667 was awarded to Sheila Mack, and $500,000 to the estate of James Mack. Despite the existence of a will dated 5 days prior to James L. Mack's death, willing his entire estate to Heather Mack, the $500,000 was awarded to Sheila Mack by a judge in Cook County, Illinois. No transcript for the case is available.

=== Relationship between Heather Mack and her mother ===
It is reported that the police were called to the Mack home on 86 occasions on theft and domestic violence reports cases between January 2004 and June 2013 all relating to domestic incidents between mother and daughter. In January 2010, Heather punched her mother's broken ankle. She was also accused of stealing $1000. In February 2011, Heather broke her mother's arm, and then removed the phone cord to prevent her mother from calling 911. In July 2011, Heather again threatened her mother. In November 2012, she bit her mother, leaving a bruise, but her mother refused to allow police to photograph it.

Heather attended Oak Park and River Forest High School from 2010 to 2014. While a senior at Oak Park, Heather began dating Tommy Schaefer, an unemployed rapper also known as Tommy EXX. Heather's mother did not approve of the relationship and so she sold their house and moved Heather and herself to the Gold Coast neighborhood of Chicago. Despite this, Heather became pregnant by Tommy. According to her lawyer, Heather had had two abortions under her mother's control and her mother was seeking to obtain a power of attorney over her daughter to enforce the third abortion, at the time that Sheila booked their final trip to Bali, where she was still waiting for blood work to find out if Heather was really pregnant.

== Murder ==
In August 2014, Sheila and Heather arrived at the St. Regis Hotel in Nusa Dua, Bali, where they had flown first class. Heather stole her mother's credit card and booked a business class flight to Bali for her boyfriend Tommy.

Tommy claimed that he had gone to Bali to tell Sheila about Heather's pregnancy, but emails later released showed that this was a lie.

On the night of August 7, 2014, security camera video at the St. Regis showed Sheila having an argument with Schaefer in the hotel lobby. Shortly after, Tommy Schaefer killed Sheila with a metallic blunt object in the room, which then led to Heather and Tommy stuffing the body of Sheila Von Wiese Mack into a suitcase. The two then put the suitcase with the body into the trunk of a cab outside the St Regis. After the couple did not return, a security guard found blood outside the suitcase and advised the cab driver to go to the police station. After police found the body inside the suitcase, both Mack and Schaefer were arrested at a nearby motel. The couple told police that Sheila was killed by robbers, but they were able to escape.

== Trial ==
On August 15, 2014, both Mack and Schaefer were designated as prisoners. On August 20, a urine test confirmed that Mack was pregnant, which was initially thought to be a ruse for her to be sent home. On September 19, Schaefer admitted to killing Sheila and Heather admitted to helping him stuff the body into the suitcase. They were both charged with premeditated murder on January 14, 2015, for which the punishment could have been death by firing squad.

Schaefer claimed that he had killed Sheila Von Wiese Mack after she had threatened to kill their unborn baby, and choked him for half a minute. Heather Mack was sentenced to 10 years in prison, and Tommy Schaefer to 18 years in April 2015. Judges said during sentencing that they were lenient to Heather because she had given birth to a baby.

On September 23, 2015, the cousin of Tommy Schaefer, Robert Bibbs, was arrested in Chicago on federal charges for conspiracy for advising Mack and Schaefer about how to kill Mack's mother. He was sentenced to 9 years in prison on June 2, 2017, on one count of conspiracy to commit foreign murder. The plea deal stated that Bibbs was aware that Heather had offered Tommy $50,000 to kill her mother, and that Bibbs advised Schaefer on how to kill her, and that he encouraged him to kill her.

== Trust fund lawsuits ==
Mack was the beneficiary of a $1.6 million trust fund from her mother, which would pay her small annual payments until the age of 30, and then the balance at that time.

During the court case, up to $150,000 was initially approved to cover legal expenses, plus smaller payments for food and personal expenses. Sheila's brother, Bill Wiese, the administrator of the estate, expressed concern that the money was being used to cover bribes, when a demand came from her Indonesian lawyer for a further $200,000 lump sum.

The final disposition of the trust fund was resolved in a 2018 settlement in favor of Heather's daughter, Estelle Schaefer (born March 17, 2015).

== 2021 release from prison ==
Heather Mack received a total of 34 months' remission from her prison sentence, including a six-month Independence day remission awarded by President Joko Widodo in August 2021, and was freed from prison on 29 October 2021. Mack wanted to stay in Indonesia with her daughter, claiming it was safer than Chicago. Indonesian immigration indicated that both would be immediately deported, as her daughter was born American under Indonesia's jus sanguinis nationality law.

Upon her arrival in the United States, Mack was arrested on conspiracy and obstruction charges. Her federal trial was scheduled for July 2023, but in June, Mack pleaded guilty to one count of conspiring to kill a U.S. national. Under the terms of her plea agreement, she faced a maximum of 28 years in prison.

On January 17, 2024, Mack was sentenced to 26 years in prison. She is currently at Federal Correctional Institution, Hazelton in West Virginia.
