= 2024 South Carolina Democratic presidential primary =

- February 3, 2024

65 delegates (55 pledged, 10 unpledged) to the Democratic National Convention
- Turnout: 4% of registered voters

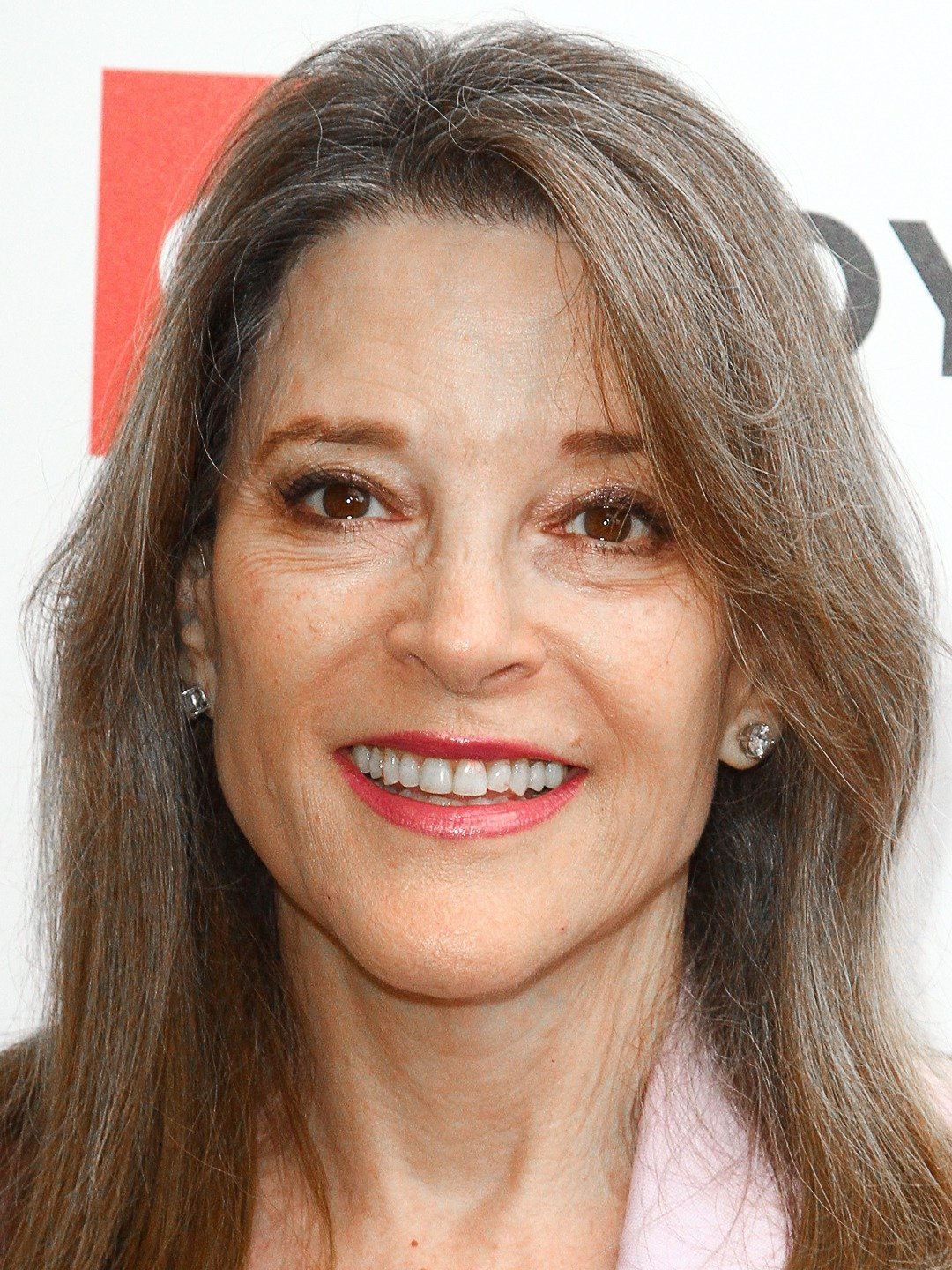
Candidate	Joe Biden	Marianne Williamson
Home state	Delaware	Washington, D.C.
Delegate count	55	0
Popular vote	126,493	2,732
Percentage	96.2%	2.1%
Results by county
Biden
>90%

The 2024 South Carolina Democratic presidential primary was held on February 3, 2024, as part of the Democratic Party primaries for the 2024 presidential election. 55 delegates to the Democratic National Convention were allocated, with 10 additional unpledged delegates. The open primary was the first officially recognized contest during the Democratic primary window. In the Republican cycle the respective primary was held three weeks later, traditionally behind Iowa, New Hampshire and Nevada.

CNN and Associated Press called the race early, for incumbent President Joe Biden. Biden won with a turnout of 4% of registered voters, receiving no less than 94% of the vote in every county.

== Scheduling ==
Under the Democratic Party's 2024 calendar that was released in February 2023, South Carolina was scheduled to hold the first primary on February 3, with New Hampshire and Nevada expected to hold their primaries on February 6. However, due to New Hampshire state law requiring that its primary must be held first, the state held a primary boycotted by the Democratic National Committee (DNC) on January 23, which incumbent president Joe Biden won as a write-in candidate. The election marked the first time that South Carolina hosted the first primary of the Democratic nominating process supported by the DNC.

== Procedure ==
Christale Spain, the first black woman state chair of the South Carolina Democratic Party, was put in charge of running the primary. South Carolina holds open primaries, so any registered voter in the state could participate.

South Carolina chose 55 pledged delegates, with 10 additional unpledged superdelegates that participated as party leaders and officials. The pledged delegates were allocated proportionally based on the results of the primary; 36 delegates by congressional districts, and the other 12 at large. Candidates who would receive less than 15% of the vote in a congressional district or at large would not receive any delegates from that level.

== Candidates ==
The following candidates were certified by the executive council of the South Carolina Democratic Party as candidates:

- Joe Biden
- Dean Phillips
- Marianne Williamson

=== Failed to make ballot ===
The following candidates filed, although they were not certified by the council:

- Eban Cambridge (incomplete candidate filing)
- Cenk Uygur (disqualified due to not being a natural-born citizen)

In December 2023, Uygur's campaign filed a lawsuit against the state party for rejecting his candidate filing.

== Polling ==
Poll source	Date(s) administered	Sample size	Margin of error	Joe Biden	Dean Phillips	Marianne Williamson	Undecided
Emerson College	January 2–3, 2024	320 (LV)	± 5.4%	69.4%	5.2%	3.0%	22.4%

Hypothetical polling

Poll source	Date(s) administered	Sample size	Margin of error	Pete Buttigieg	Roy Cooper	Kamala Harris	Gavin Newsom	Bernie Sanders	Elizabeth Warren	Undecided
Spry Strategies	January 17–19, 2022	251 (LV)	–	14%	2%	26%	6%	8%	10%	34%

== Endorsements ==
Joe Biden

U.S. Representatives

- Jim Clyburn, SC-06 (1993–present), House Assistant Democratic Leader (2011–2019, 2023–present)

Party officials

- Jaime Harrison, Chair of the Democratic National Committee (2021–present)

Notable individuals

- Pamela Hemphill, former Trump supporter and participant in the January 6 United States Capitol attack

== Results ==
2024 South Carolina Democratic primary
Candidate	Votes	%	Delegates
Joe Biden (incumbent)	126,493	96.21	55
Marianne Williamson	2,732	2.08	0
Dean Phillips	2,247	1.71	0
Total	131,472	100%	55

== See also ==
- 2024 South Carolina Republican presidential primary
- 2024 Democratic Party presidential primaries
- 2024 United States presidential election
- 2024 United States presidential election in South Carolina
- 2024 United States elections
