= Pamela Hemphill =

American Capitol rioter

- Born: 1953 (age 72–73); California
- Occupation: Former substance abuse counselor
- Known for: Participation in the January 6 United States Capitol attack, refusing a pardon from President Donald Trump
- Political party: Democratic
- Convictions: Demonstrating, picketing or parading in a Capitol building
- Penalty: 60 days imprisonment, 36 months probation, $500 restitution
- Capture status: Released

Pamela Hemphill (born 1953) is an American former Trump supporter who took part in the United States Capitol attack on January 6, 2021.

Hemphill was born in California, her mother a waitress and addict and her father an absent alcoholic. After retiring from a 27-year substance abuse counselling career in 2011 and moving to Boise, Idaho, she became politicised during the Dakota Access Pipeline protests in 2016, initially attending the protests to oppose the project but later becoming pro-pipeline. She attended anti-mask mandate meetings and protests organised by Ammon Bundy in 2020, and voted for Donald Trump in both the 2016 and 2020 US presidential elections.

Hemphill livestreamed the 2021 Capitol attack on Facebook, spending about 20 minutes inside the Capitol building. She was convicted and sentenced in 2022 to 60 days in prison with 36 months of probation and $500 restitution for one count of demonstrating, picketing or parading in a Capitol building, to which she had pleaded guilty. Hemphill is noted for changing her mind on Donald Trump during her time in prison and afterward, supporting Joe Biden and voting for Kamala Harris in the 2024 presidential election, as well as for her refusal of Trump's presidential pardon in 2025.

== Early life and career ==
Hemphill was born in California in 1953. Her mother was a waitress, and was mentally ill and addicted to prescription drugs. Her father was a railroad worker who was an alcoholic, though Hemphill was told that he had died when she was young, and only remembers meeting him once, at five years old. Hemphill has said she was in and out of care homes as a teenager, and was sexually abused at this time. Hemphill has made some unverifiable claims about her childhood, including that her mother was a "psychopath" and a possible murderer, and that she remembers her mother performing what she describes as satanic rituals. As a young adult, Hemphill herself became an alcoholic but became sober in 1979.

In 1984, Hemphill became a drugs and alcohol counsellor for substance abuse. She voted in the 2008 election for Barack Obama, the only time she had voted for a Democrat before the attack; she has stated that she usually voted for whoever her mostly Republican-supporting family recommended. She moved to Boise, Idaho three months prior to retiring from counselling in 2011.

== Politicisation ==
=== Dakota Access Pipeline protests ===
In summer 2016, Hemphill saw a TV news bulletin concerning a protest by Native Americans and others on the Standing Rock Sioux Reservation in North Dakota, 1,000 miles away, over proposals to build a US$3.78 billion, 1,172-mile (1,886 km) underground oil pipe. Seeing that one of the Native American protesters had been apparently bitten by a pipeline guard dog, she travelled to the protest to aid them. When she arrived, she has stated that she was told by the elders that "the protests had been hijacked by other groups like ‘free Palestine’ and Black Lives Matter [who were] taking advantage of the coverage." She stayed there for a few days before going home.

She was later sent a YouTube video appearing to show that the Alsatian guard dog she had seen in news coverage had been beaten by the man first with a stick. She has said that her brother, a Republican voter, told her to "research the other side"; she came to believe that the protester was the aggressor and was representative of the whole group of protesters. Following this, she wrote in one discussion forum that she was "pro pipeline", and wrote a self-published book entitled We Stand! We Rise! We Resist!: Where the Leftist Tactics Began & Now They’re Coming to a City Near You!, which criticised left-wingers as "economic terrorists". She voted for Donald Trump in the 2016 United States presidential election.

=== Protests against COVID-19 mitigation efforts ===
In 2020, she began following right-wing antigovernment extremist Ammon Bundy on social media and later attended his meetings after he began advocating against mask mandates and other perceived government overreaches during the COVID-19 pandemic. She has stated that "They were saying that Democrats wanted to turn America into a communist nation. I didn’t know any Democrats; I was naive. And I liked Ammon. He was talking about the constitution. He was carrying a Bible. I wasn’t particularly religious, but I’d worked the 12-steps programme of Alcoholics Anonymous, which is spiritual. I thought these were good people doing God’s will. And, I mean, he was a charmer."

Hemphill was involved in the Idaho Statehouse protest in August that year, objecting to COVID-19-related bills. The protest resulted in glass in a door being shattered, as well as Bundy's arrest. Later that month, she attended another protest by Bundy's followers at St. Luke's Boise Medical Center, where a man was undergoing medical treatment after he was injured trying to stop Bundy's arrest. There, she told her fellow protesters to "get outside" when the protesters entered the building, stating that, "We don’t harm people. This is a hospital, there are sick people in here." She livestreamed this protest to Facebook, where she had by this point gained thousands of followers. She again voted for Trump in the 2020 United States presidential election, though she had not been to any of his rallies in person before January 6, instead watching them on television.

== January 6 United States Capitol attack ==
=== Preparations ===
Hemphill was being treated for breast cancer at the time of the riot, having undergone a mastectomy for the condition in November. For Christmas, her brother bought her a plane ticket so she could join the rally; she has said that "he knew [she] liked to videotape everything," that she "wanted to stream it live," and "liked the attention [her] videos were getting, that these messages were getting heard." On a Facebook post about her plans to join the January 6 rally, she wrote that "it's a war!" The evening before the attack, Hemphill attended an event hosted by far-right radio host Alex Jones, posting a video of herself there on her YouTube channel, saying "let's go to the Capitol," and "Don't worry, Trump's coming in office."

On pain medication, and having brought a selfie stick with her, Hemphill arrived at the "Stop the Steal" rally on the Ellipse late; she heard from different people that Trump would go to the Capitol with a crowd to protest the certification of votes that would finalize President Joe Biden's victory in the 2020 election, and thus walked to the Capitol.

=== Capitol attack ===
Hemphill livestreamed the attack to her 30,000 followers on Facebook. She pushed past police lines three times as the attack began. She has since stated that at one point, she fell down and that a person stepped on her head, breaking her glasses. She was filmed asking for assistance from police after being in the crowd, stating that she had "had surgery," before going to the doors of the capital, disobeying the officer who had told her to rest by a gate. She was seen in the Capitol rotunda, telling fellow rioters to "come on in, come on, have fun... This is your house!" After some time, officers in riot gear entered and a Capitol police officer, who identified himself as "Joe", escorted Hemphill outside.

After exiting the Capitol, Hemphill has since said that she wanted to get away from it, but saw Jacob Chansley who was dressed in a fur headdress and buffalo horns, electing to record him rather than leave the area. She entered the office of then-Democratic Speaker of the House Nancy Pelosi after being encouraged to do so. She later stated again that she was hurt, telling officers that she had "40 stitches". She was escorted out by law enforcement, having spent a total of about 20 minutes in the Capitol building. Hemphill was nicknamed the "MAGA Granny" online following the attack, in reference to Donald Trump's "Make America Great Again" slogan.

=== Arrest and trial ===
Eight months after the attack, Federal Bureau of Investigation agents arrived at her front door in Boise, Idaho, and she was arrested on August 3, 2021.

At her trial in federal court in 2022, prosecutors argued that she had exaggerated an injury to "distract" officers from dealing with more violent protesters. She pleaded guilty to one count of demonstrating, picketing or parading in a Capitol building, and apologized for "everything [she] said and did at the Capitol". In exchange for the guilty plea, prosecutors dropped three additional misdemeanor charges. She was sentenced by U.S. District Senior Judge Royce Lamberth on May 24, 2022, to 60 days in prison with 36 months of probation and $500 restitution. Hemphill's chemotherapy treatment ended just before she entered prison. She served her full sentence at a federal prison in Dublin, California, from July 2022. While there, she says she was looked after by a black woman, Michelle West, who was incarcerated for her involvement in a drug-conspiracy case linked to a murder in the early 1990s. Hemphill was released on September 16, 2022. She has stated that she began to doubt Trump's election claims during her time in prison.

== After incarceration ==
Hemphill began seeing a therapist again, and through this came to terms with the fact that that she could have left the crowd outside the Capitol. She has stated that she changed her mind on Trump in April 2023, around the time of her 70th birthday. She has credited multiple causes for this change; she participated in discussions about the Capitol riot on Twitter spaces, exposing her to facts about the riot and the 2020 election. In 2025 she said that after leaving prison, "my critical thinking returned. I recognised the facts of January 6 — that Trump had lied about the election being stolen; that Nancy Pelosi was not responsible."

In June 2023 Donald Trump responded to a post on Truth Social claiming that Hemphill would have to spend more time in jail than Hunter Biden, writing the word "horrible". She responded on Twitter, "please @realDonaldTrump don't be using me for anything, I'm not a victim of Jan6, I pleaded guilty because I was guilty! #StopTheSpin". She was interviewed by The Daily Beast, to which she stated that she had broken from "the Trump cult" three months prior. She described herself as an "ex-MAGA Granny" on social media. That September she published an open letter to Congress in which she wrote "I am not a victim of the government, the Justice Department was not weaponized against me, I was a participant who broke the law." A boyfriend that she had for 12 years left her because of it, and she has stated that she received death threats.

Hemphill voted for Joe Biden in the 2024 South Carolina Democratic presidential primary while living in Summerville, South Carolina, and later supported Kamala Harris when Biden withdrew from the election.

Hemphill stated on January 13, 2025, after the 2024 United States presidential election, that she would "refuse a pardon from felon Trump" once he took office, referencing Trump's announcement that he would pardon those convicted for January 6-related crimes. She wrote, "I'm not going to be bullied by MAGA anymore, as those who went as far as calling my Probation Officer trying to get me in trouble backfired on them, thinking I would stop speaking out, just give me more confidence to continue!"

The day after President Trump issued the pardons, she again emphasized that she would not accept hers and took steps to "file a letter of rejection." She argued that accepting the pardon would be "an insult to the Capitol Police". Under the precedent set by United States v. Wilson (1833), an individual has the right to refuse a pardon. In June 2025, former vice president Mike Pence wrote a letter to Hemphill expressing admiration for her decision to reject the clemency. She has since attended local Democratic Party meetings in Boise.

On January 6, 2026, Hemphill reiterated her apology to Capitol Police officers during a hearing held on the fifth anniversary of the Capitol riot.

== See also ==
- List of cases of the January 6 United States Capitol attack (G-L)
- Criminal proceedings in the January 6 United States Capitol attack – List of people charged with crimes
- Jason Riddle – American Capitol rioter
- List of people granted executive clemency in the second Trump presidency
