= Bear spray =

Type of aerosol spray bear deterrent

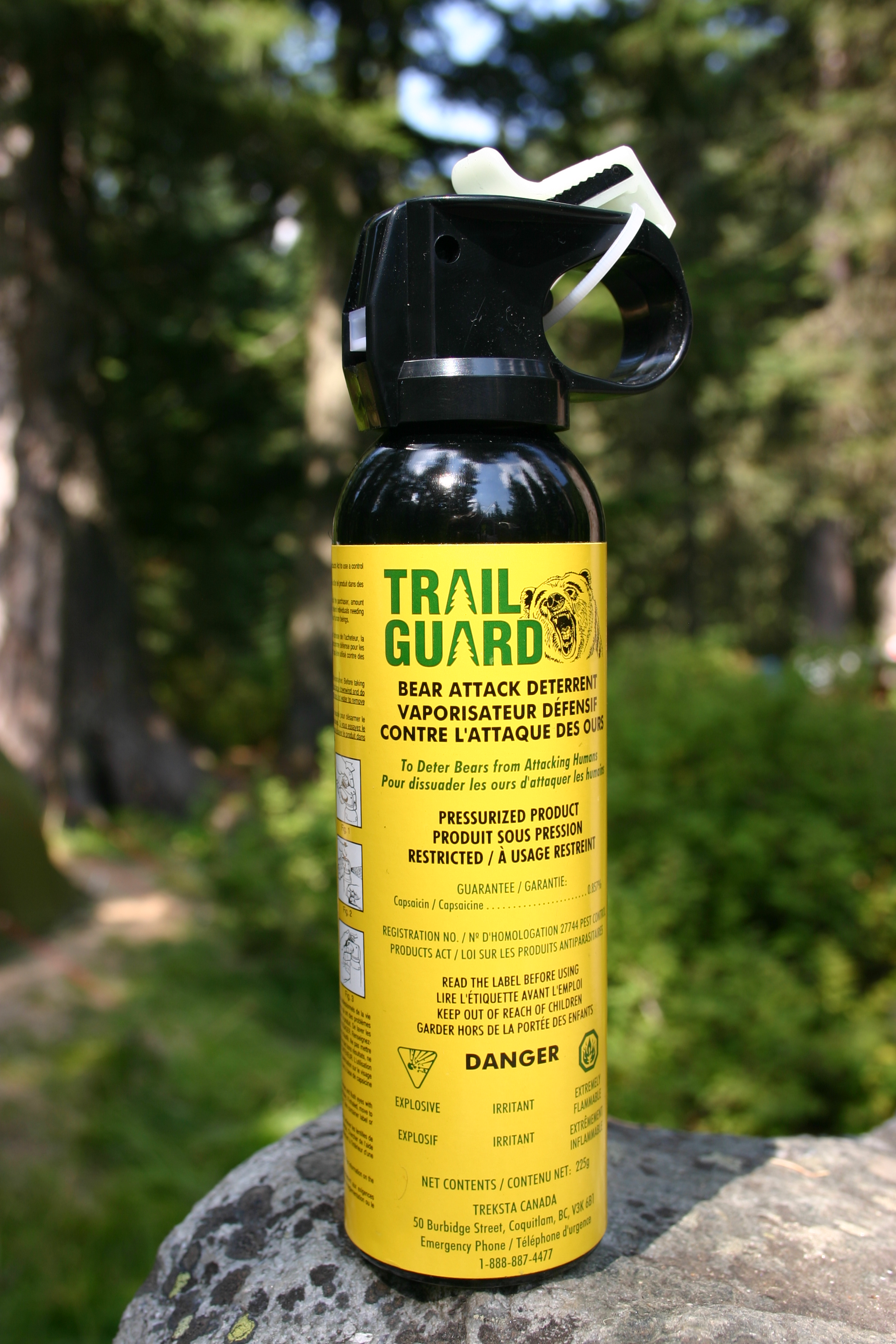
A bear spray dispenser

Bear spray is a specific aerosol spray bear deterrent, whose active ingredients are the potent irritant capsaicin and related capsaicinoids, that is used to deter aggressive or charging bears.

== Use ==
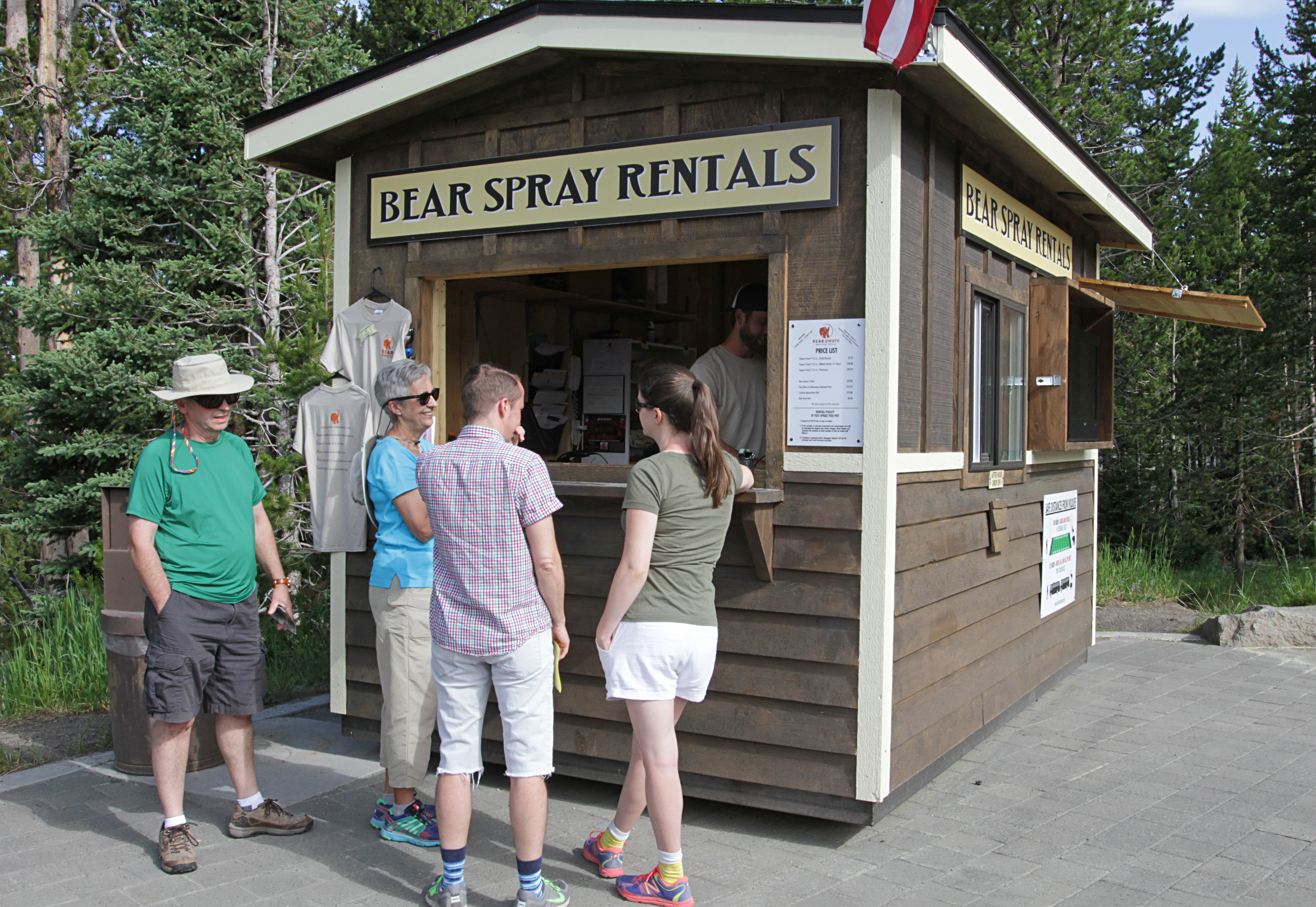
A rental for bear spray

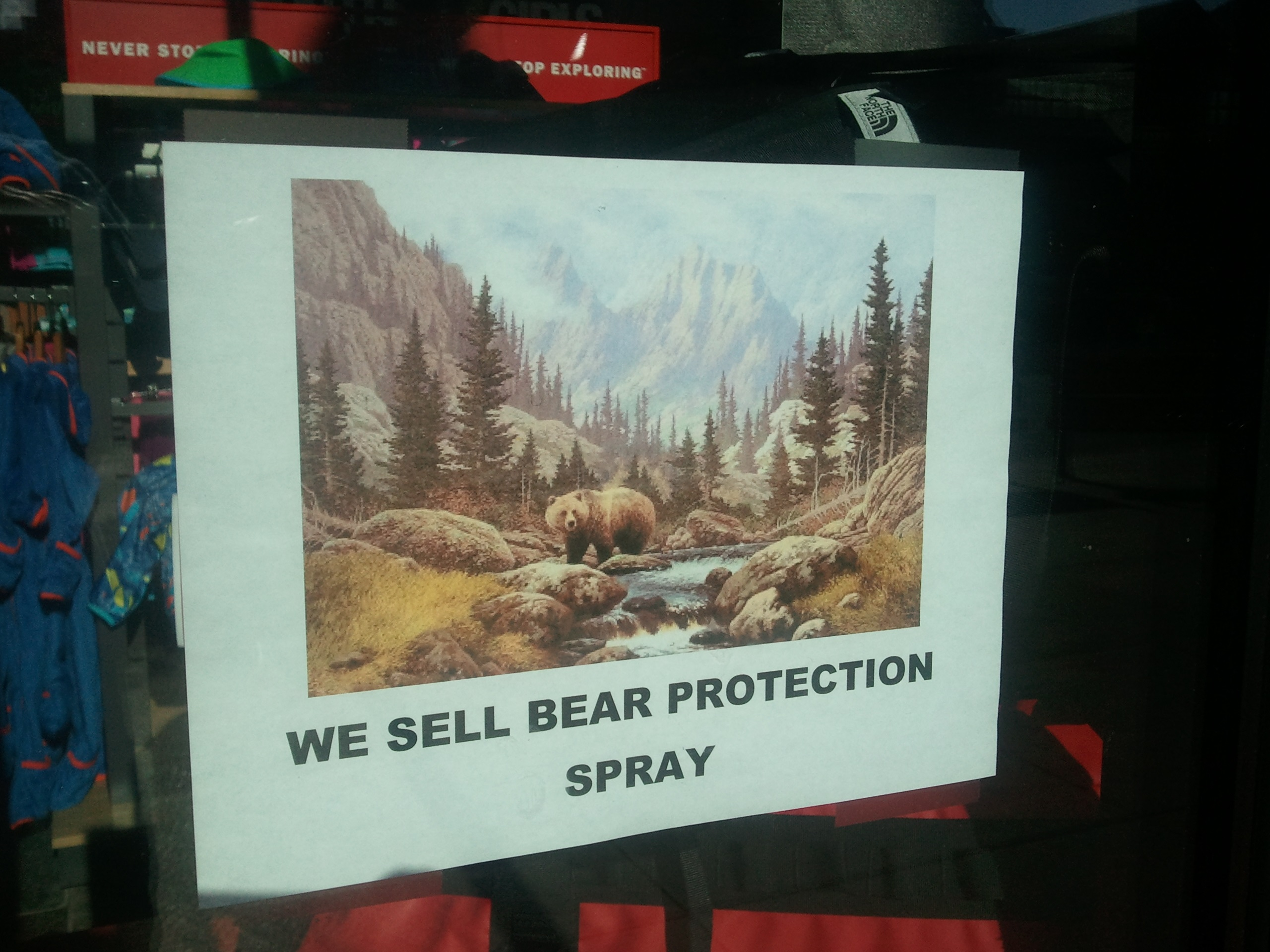
Bear protection spray for sale in Banff, Alberta

The key active ingredients of bear spray are 1–2% capsaicin, and related capsaicinoids.

Bear spray is intended to deter an aggressive or charging bear; a user points the canister at an aggressive bear and sprays the contents for 2–3 seconds. The maximum range of sprays by different manufacturers varies, but they are reported to be effective when sprayed at a charging or aggressive bear from a distance of 1.5 to 3 meters (4 ft 11 in to 9 ft 10 in).

=== Effectiveness ===
The efficacy of bear spray depends on the situation and circumstances of the attack. A 2008 review of bear attacks in Alaska from 1985 to 2006 found that bear spray stopped a bear's "undesirable behavior" in 92% of cases. Further, 98% of persons using bear spray in close-range encounters escaped uninjured. In the 2008 study, Tom Smith of Brigham Young University reported, "No bear spray has ever been reported to kill a bear. It is our belief that widespread use of bear spray will promote human safety and bear conservation." Latent spray (on an object) has also led to the attraction of bears, which usually ends up with the bear destroying the spray-covered object.

A United States Geological Survey article, "Bear Spray Safety Program," says that bear spray is effective in fending off aggressive bears while also preventing injury to both the human and the bear, though it emphasizes that the "...deterrent is [not] 100-percent effective." The U.S. Fish and Wildlife Service states, "The Service supports the pepper spray policy of the Interagency Grizzly Bear Committee, which states that bear spray is not a substitute for following proper bear avoidance safety techniques, and that bear spray should be used as a deterrent only in an aggressive or attacking confrontation with a bear."

==== Studies ====
Studies suggest that bear spray may be effective at reducing the risk of injury or death. While bear spray can be effective, authorities stress that proper bear-awareness and avoidance techniques are the best ways to minimize injuries due to human–bear conflict.

A 2008 "Efficacy of Bear Deterrent Spray in Alaska" study stated:

- Red pepper spray stopped bears' undesirable behavior 92% of the time when used on brown bears, 90% for black bears, and 100% for polar bears.
- Of all persons carrying sprays, 98% were uninjured by bears in close-range encounters.
- All bear-inflicted injuries (n=3) associated with defensive spraying involved brown bears and were relatively minor (i.e., no hospitalization required).
- In 7% (5 of 71) of bear spray incidents, wind was reported to have interfered with spray accuracy, although it reached the bear in all cases.
- In 14% (10 of 71) of bear spray incidents, users reported that the spray had affected themselves, ranging from minor irritation (11% of incidents, 8 of 71) to near incapacitation (3%, 2 of 71).
- Bear spray represents an effective alternative to lethal force and should be considered as an option for personal safety for those recreating and working in bear country.

A 2022 study on bear spray efficacy in polar bear attacks showed that in incidents involving free-ranging polar bears from 1986 to 2019 in Canada, Russia, and the United States, the bear spray was an effective deterrent in close-range encounters, stopping undesirable behavior in 18 of 19 incidents. The study suggested that in 54 other analyzed polar bear attacks and attempted attacks on humans where bear spray was not carried, in 93% of those incidents, the use of bear spray might have saved the lives of both the people and bears involved if it had been available and deployed properly.

The absolute risk from bears—even in grizzly (brown bear) country—is so low that bear spray cannot much decrease the risk. Bears are known to fatally attack only a relatively small number of backpackers in North America every decade, out of many millions—for instance, about 45,000 backcountry backpackers camp overnight in Yellowstone per year, roughly half of whom (48 percent) do not carry bear spray.

=== Human-on-human use ===
Several Canadian police forces routinely deal with incidents of illegal use of bear spray against humans, including Edmonton, Vancouver and Saskatoon.

== History ==
Capsaicin bear spray was developed in the mid-1980s under principal investigator Carrie Hunt, a University of Montana graduate student working under the supervision of Charles Jonkel and Bart O'Gara. Hunt had identified commercial pepper sprays as an effective deterrent for bears in previous research; however, they were unreliable and required close proximity. Hunt's thesis was published by the U.S. Fish and Wildlife Service in 1984. Bill Pounds, who eventually founded Counter Assault bear spray, assisted Hunt and offered to help devise a prototype for a reliable aerosol bear spray canister for Hunt's research. They developed a bear spray formula with a spray range of over 30 feet (9.1 meters) and a spray time of over 7 seconds. Pounds played an important part in developing the ingredients, the dispersal system, and the recommended specifications of bear spray.

== Legality ==
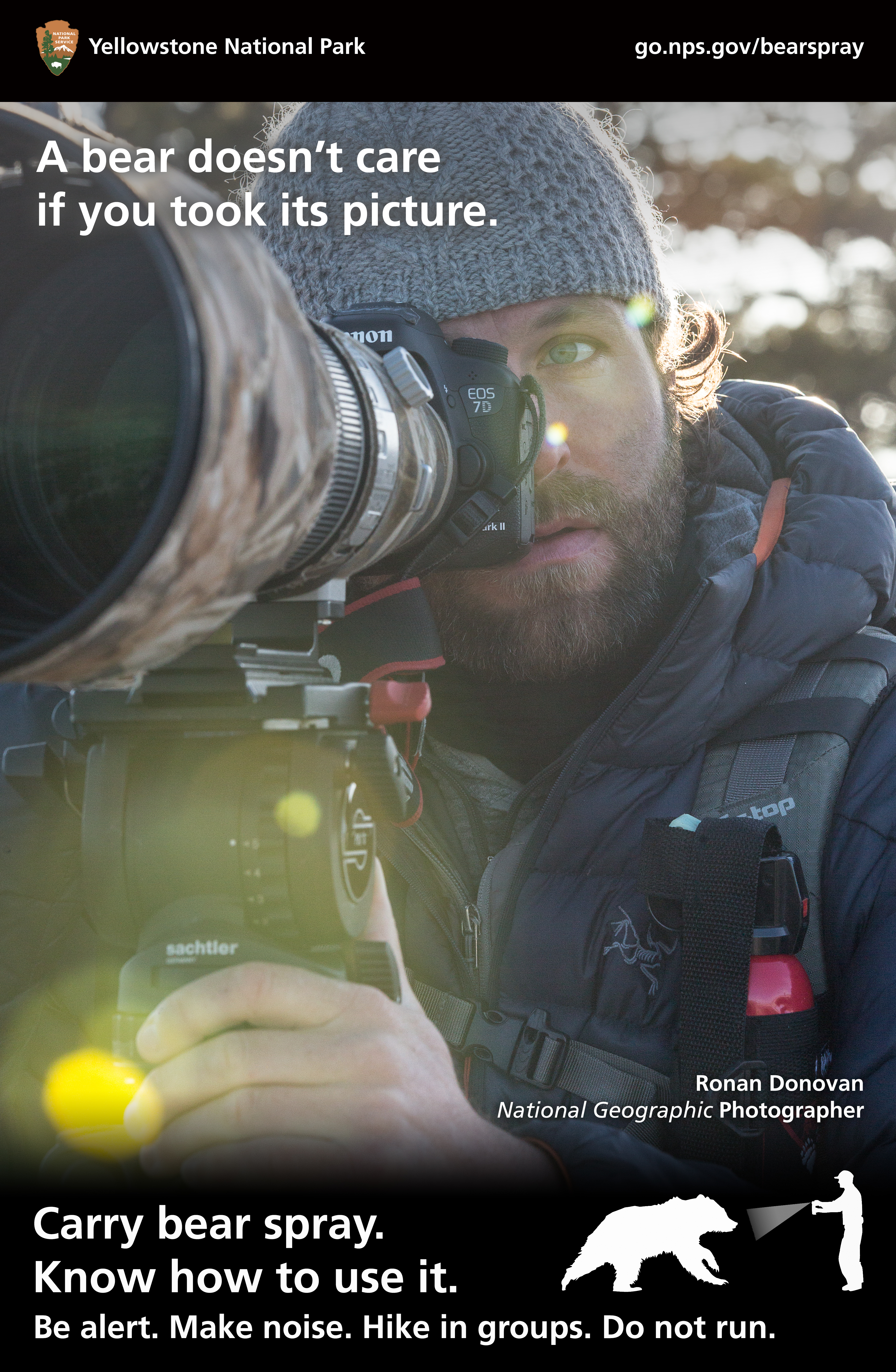
A 2016 poster campaign promotes carrying bear spray in Yellowstone National Park.

Bear spray is legal across the United States. It can be purchased even in Hawaii and New York where standard pepper sprays are illegal unless bought from certified firearms dealers or pharmacists. In Canada, while legal for use against bears, bear spray is prohibited if intended to be used against humans.

Visitors to the backcountry areas of Glacier and Yellowstone National Parks are encouraged to carry it. The Alaska Department of Natural Resources website advises those seeking protection to, at minimum, if not carrying a firearm, at least carry bear spray, saying: "This incapacitating spray teaches bears a lesson without permanently maiming them."

The capsaicin in products sold in the U.S. are regulated by the EPA, under the FIFRA act by Congress.

== See also ==
- Bear danger
- Pepper spray
