= Pardon of January 6 United States Capitol attack defendants =

Clemency proclamation issued by Donald Trump

- Granting Pardons and Commutation of Sentences for Certain Offenses Relating to the Events at or Near the United States Capitol on January 6, 2021

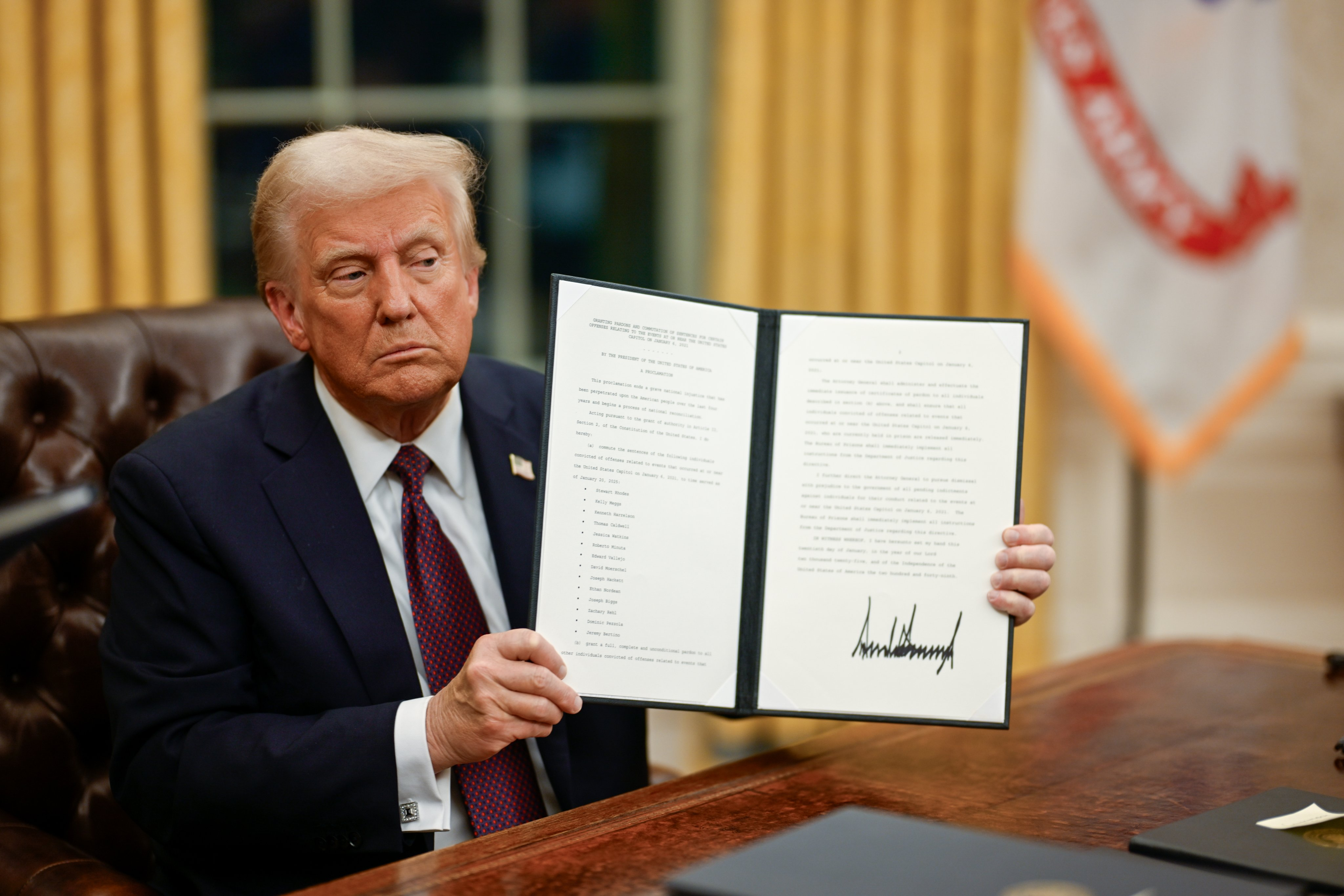
- Trump displays the signed proclamation
- Type: Presidential proclamation
- Number: 10887
- President: Donald Trump
- Signed: January 20, 2025

Federal Register details
- Publication date: January 29, 2025
- Document citation: 2025-01950

Summary
- Granting clemency to about 1,500 people associated with the January 6 United States Capitol attack, with the commutation of 14

On January 20, 2025, during the first day of his second term, United States president Donald Trump granted blanket clemency to all people, nearly 1,600, convicted of or awaiting trial or sentencing for offenses related to the January 6 United States Capitol attack that occurred near the end of his first presidential term. Most of them received full pardons, while the sentences of 14 members of the Oath Keepers and the Proud Boys were commuted. More than 600 rioters had been convicted of or pleaded guilty to assault of or obstructing law enforcement officers and 170 of using a deadly weapon.

More than five percent of people pardoned for January 6 actions have since been arrested and charged with other crimes, including homicide, burglary, theft, stalking, child pornography, sexual assault on minors, and driving under the influence. By June 2026, at least 97 Capitol attack defendants had been arrested, about 1 in 16.

== Background ==
After losing the 2020 presidential election to Joe Biden, Trump repeatedly made false claims that widespread electoral fraud had occurred and that he had legitimately won the election. Although most resulting lawsuits were either dismissed or ruled against by numerous courts, Trump conspired with his campaign team to submit documents in several states (all of which had been won by Biden) which falsely claimed to be legitimate electoral certificates for President Trump and Vice President Mike Pence. After the submission of these documents, the Trump campaign intended that the presiding officer of the United States Senate, either President of the Senate Pence or President pro tempore Chuck Grassley, would claim to have the unilateral power to reject electors during the January 6, 2021, vote counting session; the presiding officer would reject all electors from the several states in which the Trump campaign had submitted false documents, leaving 232 votes for Trump and 222 for Biden, thereby overturning the election results in favor of Trump. The plans for January 6 failed to come to fruition after Pence refused to follow the campaign's proposals.

Trump nevertheless urged his supporters on January 6, 2021, to march to the Capitol while the joint session of Congress was assembled there to count electoral votes and formalize Biden's victory, culminating with hundreds storming the building and interrupting the electoral vote count.

By the end of 2021, 725 people had been charged with federal crimes. That number rose to 1,000 by the second anniversary of the attack, to 1,200 by the third anniversary (three-quarters of whom had by then been found guilty) and to 1,500 before the fourth anniversary. The Justice Department documented assaults on over 140 police officers and property damage exceeding US$2.8 million to the Capitol building and grounds. Approximately 170 defendants had been accused of using deadly or dangerous weapons against law enforcement officers, including fire extinguishers and bear spray.

Bodycam video taken at the U.S. Capitol on January 6, 2021

Throughout the Biden administration, Trump characterized the January 6 defendants as "political prisoners" and "hostages." He promoted a revisionist history of the event by downplaying the severity of the violence and spreading conspiracy theories. House Republicans also spread a fringe conspiracy that the FBI orchestrated the attack. On January 29, 2022, when over 760 people had been charged, Trump said at a Texas rally that he would be inclined to pardon the rioters if reelected in 2024, which he repeated at a Tennessee rally in June 2022. In November, four days before the midterm elections, he said: "Let them all go now!" On May 10, 2023, he said he would be "inclined to pardon many of them" while hedging by saying "a couple of them, probably, they got out of control". On September 15, 2023, he said in an interview that aired two days later: "I'm going to look at them, and I certainly might [pardon them] if I think it's appropriate."

Then-representative Adam Schiff, who served on the House committee that investigated the attack and was the lead manager during Trump's first impeachment trial, told MSNBC in February 2022 that Trump's offer of pardons suggested that he "condoned" the violence. Representative Pete Aguilar, who was also on the committee, told CNN the same day that he considered Trump's offer to be witness tampering.

On December 8, 2024, as president–elect, Trump said in an interview with Kristen Welker on Meet the Press, that he would pardon the rioters on his "first day" in office except for any he might deem to be "radical, crazy." Then-vice president–elect JD Vance stated that pardons should be given to those who "protested peacefully", and not those who did so violently. Vance initially advocated for a blanket pardon in private but thought Trump would not want to pursue one for political reasons, and was reportedly "100% behind" Trump's decision to grant clemency to all rioters. A week following the pardon, Vance told Face the Nation that he and Trump perceived a "massive denial of due process of liberty" and that the pardon was the "right decision".

== Presidential clemency ==
On January 20, 2025, Trump issued a proclamation titled "Granting Pardons and Commutation of Sentences for Certain Offenses Relating to the Events at or Near the United States Capitol on January 6, 2021". The proclamation categorized prior criminal proceedings as a "grave national injustice" against the American people, and positioned the pardons as beginning a "process of national reconciliation". Two inside sources stated that Trump made the decision to give blanket pardons at the "last minute" just days before the inauguration, with one advisor saying Trump said "Fuck it: Release 'em all".

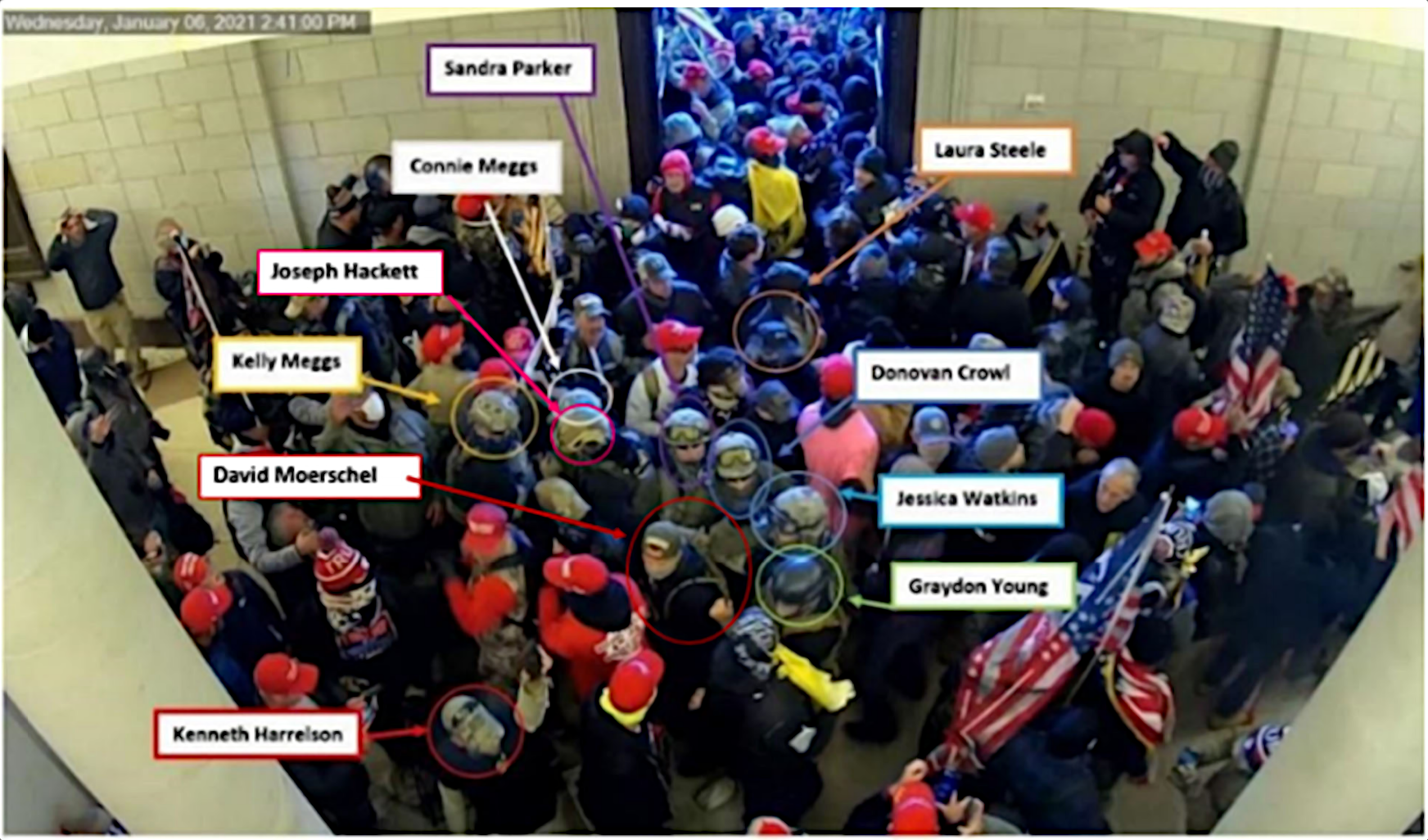
Members and associates of Oath Keepers with some identified inside the U.S. Capitol

Citing Article II, Section 2 of the Constitution of the United States, the proclamation established two distinct categories of clemency for individuals involved in the events at the United States Capitol on January 6, 2021. The first category of clemency consisted of sentence commutations to time served for fourteen named individuals. These commutations applied to prominent figures in the January 6 events, including Oath Keepers leader Stewart Rhodes with members Kelly Meggs and Roberto Minuta, Proud Boys leaders Ethan Nordean, Jeremy Bertino, and Joseph Biggs, and Proud Boy member Dominic Pezzola, who was the first rioter to breach the Capitol building, all of whom had their sentences reduced to time served "as of January 20, 2025". The second category consisted of "full, complete, and unconditional" pardons granted to every other defendant convicted in relation to the events of January 6.

The Attorney General was directed to immediately issue pardon certificates to all eligible individuals and ensure the release of any incarcerated persons affected by the pardons. Additionally, the United States Department of Justice was ordered to dismiss "with prejudice" all pending indictments related to January 6 conduct, and the Federal Bureau of Prisons received explicit orders to implement all Justice Department instructions regarding both the releases and the dismissal of pending cases.

=== Further pardons ===
On May 13, 2025, Ed Martin announced he would serve as the DOJ Pardon Attorney. On May 22, Peter Ticktin of the American Rights Alliance recommended that Martin pursue full pardons for Rhodes, Biggs, Nordean, Rehl and Pezzola, as well as for two other January 6 defendants (Dan Wilson and Elias Costianes) who were in prison for unrelated charges.

On November 9, 2025, Martin announced that Trump had also pardoned the "Alternate Electors of 2020". The list of 77 people who were pardoned included Rudy Giuliani, Sidney Powell, John Eastman, Jenna Ellis, Kenneth Chesebro, Mark Meadows, Boris Epshteyn and Jeffrey Clark. As none of the 77 were facing federal charges, the pardon was symbolic.

== Affected ==
=== Notable pardons granted ===
==== Gained positions ====
- Jared Lane Wise, who had been an FBI supervisory agent from 2004 through 2017, was arrested in Oregon on misdemeanor charges in May 2023 related to the attack on the Capitol. According to an FBI agent's affidavit, Wise repeatedly shouted "Kill 'em!" as he watched rioters assault officers outside the Capitol. Wise entered the Capitol through the Senate wing door and remained in the building for around nine minutes. Police body camera footage captured Wise berating officers outside the Capitol, shouting: "Shame on you! I'm former law enforcement. You're disgusting. You are the Nazi. You are the Gestapo. You can't see it." After his pardon, he became a counselor to Justice Department pardon attorney Ed Martin who was overseeing the new Weaponization Working Group investigating the FBI. Wise helped draft a report, but no report was ever made public. Martin left the group in February 2026, and soon after, Wise left the government entirely. In an X post in April, Wise said he still hoped "to fully expose the abuses by the FBI and DOJ against J6 defendants, but it became clear that this will only happen from outside of government."
- Elias Irizarry was appointed to a position in the United States Department of Justice; Joel Valdez, the acting press secretary for the Pentagon, stated that Irizarry "is a qualified, patriotic young professional, and we are proud to have him as a political appointee". At the time of the Capitol attack, Irizarry was a 19-year-old student at The Citadel, a senior military college in Charleston, South Carolina. Following his participation in the riot, Irizarry pleaded guilty to a misdemeanor charge of entering and remaining in a restricted building or grounds, for which he was sentenced to 14 days of incarceration.

==== Organizers ====
- Enrique Tarrio, the former leader of the Proud Boys who had been serving a 22-year sentence for charges including seditious conspiracy.
- Alan Hostetter, retired police chief, sentenced in December 2023 to 11 years in prison for conspiracy to obstruct an official proceeding. He drove to Washington with hatchets, knives, stun batons, pepper spray, and other gear for himself and others and used a bullhorn to encourage rioters to break the police line.

==== Rioters sentenced for attacking police officers ====
- David Nicholas Dempsey, sentenced in August 2024 to 20 years in prison for stomping on police officers' heads, using flagpoles and other objects to attack officers, and spraying bear spray into the gas mask of an officer. His prior criminal record included burglary, theft, and assault.
- Peter Schwartz, sentenced in May 2023 to 14 years to assaulting police officers with a chair and pepper spray. He boasted in a text message that he had "thrown the first chair at cops" and "started a riot". He also had a record of prior violent offenses.
- Daniel Joseph "DJ" Rodriguez, sentenced in 2023 to 12.5 years in prison for conspiracy and obstruction of an official proceeding, obstruction of justice, and assaulting a law enforcement officer with a deadly or dangerous weapon. Rodriguez had shot Officer Michael Fanone, who had been dragged into the mob by another assailant and was lying face-down on the ground, twice with a stun gun held to his neck. Fanone suffered a heart attack and other injuries during the attack. Video footage also showed Rodriguez deploying a fire extinguisher and attacking other officers with a wooden pole.
- Christopher Joseph Quaglin, member of the Proud Boys, sentenced in May 2024 by a Trump-appointed judge to 12 years in prison for choking and tackling officer Michael Fanone to the ground, attacking other officers with metal bike racks, stolen police shields, and pepper spray.
- Thomas Webster, retired police officer, sentenced in 2022 to 10 years in prison for attacking an officer with a flagpole and tackling him.
- Christopher J. Worrell, a Proud Boy member, sentenced in 2024 to 10 years in prison for attacking police officers with pepper spray.
- Thomas Harlen Smith, sentenced in October 2023 to 9 years in prison for, among other violent actions, kicking an officer in the back and knocking him to the ground and hitting two officers in the head with the metal pole he threw at them.
- Albaquerque Cosper Head, sentenced in October 2022 to seven years for dragging officer Fanone face-down down the West Terrace steps and attacking police in the entrance to the Lower West Terrace tunnel.
- Kyle J. Young, pleaded guilty to a single charge and was sentenced in September 2022 to seven years for handing the stun gun to Rodriguez and grabbing Fanone's hand when he tried to protect himself.
- Patrick McCaughey III, sentenced in April 2023 to 7.5 years for using a stolen police riot shield to crush officer Daniel Hodges in a doorframe at the entrance to the Lower West Terrace tunnel.
- Steven Cappuccio, sentenced in November 2023 to seven years for ripping off officer Hodges's gas mask and striking him across the face with his own baton.
- Andrew Taake, sentenced in June 2024 to 6.5 years for attacking officers with bear spray and a metal whip. At the time of the Capitol attack, he was out on bond for soliciting a minor in 2016. The bond was revoked in September 2021, and Houston authorities are looking to rearrest Taake.
- Shane Jenkins, sentenced in October 2023 to 84 months in prison, 36 months of supervised release, and payment of $5,165 in restitution. He broke a window with a tomahawk and threw a wooden desk drawer, a flagpole, a metal walking stick, and other objects at officers defending the West Tunnel entrance to the Capitol. In a message he sent after the Capitol attack, Jenkins wrote: "I have murder in my heart and head." In an online meeting with lawyers he compared the January 6 rioters to "Israelites who were enslaved and then released by God from bondage in Egypt, only to roam for decades through the desert". The lawyers are representing him and others in their effort to be paid restitution for their prosecutions and incarcerations.

==== Rioters found guilty of and awaiting sentencing for attacking police officers ====
- Edward J. Kelley, convicted on November 8, 2024, in federal court in Washington, D.C., of tackling a law enforcement officer from behind and throwing him to the ground and various acts of property damage inside the Capitol. His sentencing had been scheduled for April 7, 2025, when he was pardoned on January 20, 2025.

While awaiting trial in December 2022, Kelley had conspired to assassinate the law enforcement agents who had arrested him in May 2022 and those who had searched his home. In November 2024, he was convicted in federal court in Tennessee of conspiring to murder FBI employees, soliciting a crime of violence, and threatening federal officials; the sentencing date was set for May 7, 2025. In early February 2025, Kelley's attorney filed a motion arguing that the pardon for the Capitol riot also covered the murder plot and asking for Kelley's immediate release. The judge rejected the argument, and, in July 2025, Kelley was sentenced to life in prison.

==== Rioters who had awaited trial for attacking police officers ====
- Daniel Ball had been awaiting trial when he was pardoned. He was accused of throwing a device that "flashed and exploded", a wooden leg of a chair or table, and other objects at officers in the Lower West Terrace tunnel, and of damaging a shutter. Investigators searching his Florida residence as part of the case found a firearm and ammunition, items he was not allowed to possess because of two felony convictions. He was served with the arrest warrant on a federal gun charge while still in custody and had been awaiting extradition to Florida. However, the U.S. Attorney's Office in Tampa, after initially saying that clemency did not extend to the subsequent charges, followed an emerging pattern of the Department of Justice under Trump of excusing additional crimes committed outside the riot by filing a motion to drop the indictment; Ball's case was dismissed on February 25, 2025.
- Edward Jacob "Jake" Lang was in prison for four years on an 11-count indictment, including assault charges for attacking officers with a baseball bat. He is running for U.S. Senate from Florida in the Republican primary to be held in August 2026. On October 22, 2025, he said that, as senator: "I would deputize the Proud Boys and the January 6 Patriots to bounty hunt illegal immigrants." He also stated his "very first act as a US Senator" would be "to ban Islam!!" On January 17, 2026, he led a pro-ICE march in Minneapolis, where he alleged he was stabbed and attacked by counterprotesters. Lang was arrested on a felony vandalism charge on February 6, 2026, after destroying an ice sculpture at the Minnesota State Capitol that read "Prosecute ICE" on February 5. He organized a protest outside Gracie Mansion in New York City on March 7, 2026, during which a homemade explosive device was thrown outside the mayor's residence. Two suspects were arrested, and the incident was being investigated as an act of Islamic State-inspired terrorism.
- Andrew Kyle Grigsby. Was in custody awaiting trial on five felony charges, including attacking officers with bear spray.
- David Paul Daniel. Had pleaded guilty to assaulting police officers and was in custody awaiting trial. After he was charged in November 2023, FBI and Mint Hill, North Carolina, police officers discovered images of Daniel sexually abusing two children under 12 during a search of his home. He is in custody in North Carolina on charges of production and possession of child pornography and pleaded not guilty. Daniel has filed to dismiss or suppress these charges with the U.S. District Court for the Western District of North Carolina because thus far, the Justice Department has not pardoned him for additional crimes uncovered in the course of gathering evidence for the January 6 riot, as they have done for other rioters.

==== Rioters arrested for entering a restricted area and property damage ====
- Theodore Middendorf. Was awaiting trial for striking a window with a flagpole. In May 2024, he was sentenced to 19 years in prison in Illinois for committing "an act of sexual penetration" of a 7-year-old child.
- David Medina. Charged with a felony for obstructing an official proceeding, and charged with several misdemeanors. After breaking into the Capitol, he vandalized the nameplate over Nancy Pelosi's office. After his pardon, in October 2025, he rode in Homeland Security Secretary Kristi Noem's motorcade when she traveled to Portland, Oregon.

==== Rioters sentenced for entering a restricted area ====
- Matthew Huttle was sentenced in November 2023 to six months in prison and a year of supervised release for entering the Capitol and multiple offices. Huttle had a criminal record that included a sentence of 2.5 years in prison for beating and injuring his 3-year-old son. On January 26, 2025, Huttle was shot and killed while in possession of a firearm and resisting arrest during a traffic stop.
- Emily Hernandez. Pleaded guilty and was sentenced to 30 days in federal prison in 2022. She was seen holding Pelosi's broken nameplate during the riot. Nine days after the pardon, she was sentenced to 10 years in prison for killing a woman and injuring her husband in a car crash on January 5, 2022. Hernandez, who was intoxicated, drove the wrong way on Interstate 44 in Missouri and crashed head-on into an oncoming vehicle.

=== Commutations ===
Trump commuted the sentences of 14 people to "time served", making them eligible for immediate release from prison, though (unlike the pardoned people) their convictions remained on their criminal records. One of them, Thomas Caldwell, was pardoned two months later. A year later, on April 14, 2026, the Justice Department asked a federal appeals court to throw out the convictions of 12 more, which was everyone else except Jeremy Bertino. On May 22, the government moved to dismiss the indictment against eight of the defendants; U.S. district judge Amit P. Mehta said the government had not provided an adequate reason and gave it until June 5 to do so.

==== Participants ====
- Kelly Meggs, member of the Oath Keepers
- Kenneth Harrelson, member of the Oath Keepers
- Thomas Caldwell, assisted the Oath Keepers (pardoned on March 20, 2025)
- Jessica Watkins, member of the Oath Keepers
- Roberto Minuta, member of the Oath Keepers
- Edward Vallejo, member of the Oath Keepers
- David Moerschel, member of the Oath Keepers
- Joseph Hackett, member of the Oath Keepers
- Zachary Rehl, member of the Proud Boys
- Dominic Pezzola, member of the Proud Boys

==== Organizers ====
- Ethan Nordean, a leader of the Proud Boys
- Jeremy Bertino, former leader of the Proud Boys
- Joseph Biggs, a former organizer of the Proud Boys
- Stewart Rhodes, leader of the Oath Keepers, sentenced to 18 years for seditious conspiracy

=== Case dismissed in Trump's second term ===
In December 2021, Trump-appointed United States district judge Timothy J. Kelly refused to dismiss an indictment against four members of the Proud Boys who were charged with conspiracy in the 2021 United States Capitol attack. On May 4, 2023, four of the five defendants in that case, Enrique Tarrio, Joseph Biggs, Ethan Nordean and Zachary Rehl, were convicted of seditious conspiracy and conspiracy to obstruct an official proceeding, while the other defendant, Dominic Pezzola, was acquitted of seditious conspiracy. Kelly declared a mistrial for Pezzola's obstruction count as the jury deadlocked on the charge. In July 2026, Kelly dismissed the case against Nordean, Biggs, Rehl and Pezzola under protest, saying he was obliged by precedent to grant the Justice Department's motion to dismiss.

== Analysis ==
Trump's grant of clemency was described by then-Attorney General Merrick Garland as encouraging future political violence, and Trump later suggested the Proud Boys and Oath Keepers may have a place in the political conversation.

Employees in the Justice Department and legal scholars called the pardons an unprecedented and dangerous use of the pardon that created a mockery of federal law enforcement, their work, and the US justice system. An anonymous senior official in the Justice Department called the pardons an act of personal retribution that gave a "green light" to political violence and indicated approval of the January 6 attacks.

US District Judge Royce Lamberth, who was appointed by Ronald Reagan, said during a case on January 25, 2025, that during his time on the bench, he could never recall "such meritless justifications of criminal activity". Randall Eliason, a former federal prosecutor and professor at George Washington University Law School, called the pardons an abuse of power by Trump, and said they signaled that crimes committed on Trump's behalf would not be punished. Bruce Ackerman, a law and political science professor at Yale Law School, echoed that sentiment, calling the action "a president pardoning his allies for their participation in a violent coup d'etat".

Many of the pardoned rioters had prior convictions and outstanding charges for rape, child sexual exploitation, domestic violence, manslaughter, drug trafficking, and other crimes. The Justice Department has made the argument, albeit somewhat inconsistently, that Trump's pardons may extend to cases involving weapons or other crimes uncovered in January 6-related searches.

== Reactions ==
A PBS/Marist poll conducted a month before the pardons found that 89% of Democrats, 62% of independents, and 30% of Republicans disapproved of them. Reuters/Ipsos polling conducted shortly before and during the pardons found that 58% of people believed Trump should not pardon all those involved in the riot. A month later, in late February, 83% opposed pardoning violent participants. Groups as diverse as the Cato Institute and Southern Poverty Law Center also condemned the pardons. NPR reported that some Trump voters disapproved of the sweeping pardons, but that "Trump's staunchest supporters [...] refuse to believe that fellow backers of the president were violent that day" and cited conspiracy theories they read on social media.

=== Trump ===
After Trump issued the pardons, he answered affirmatively when a reporter asked whether he agreed "that it's never acceptable to assault a police officer". When asked to reconcile that opinion with his having pardoned someone who "drove a stun gun into the neck of a D.C. police officer" (this attack was against Officer Michael Fanone), Trump replied, "Well, I don't know. Was it a pardon? We're looking at commutes. We're looking at pardons." When the reporter confirmed that the person had been pardoned, Trump added, "OK, we'll take a look at everything." He continued speaking for another minute, adding: "These people have already served a long period of time, and I made a decision to grant a pardon."

On July 31, 2026, at a cabinet meeting at Camp David, Trump said of the rioters generally: "They went down for an innocent journey."

=== Prosecutors ===
In early June 2025, Greg Rosen, a top federal prosecutor, resigned from the Department of Justice. Within the U.S. Attorney's Office for the District of Columbia, Rosen had led the Capitol Siege section before Trump disbanded it. Rosen told CBS: "The message that [the pardons] send is that political violence towards a political goal is acceptable in a modern democratic society. That, from my perspective, is anathema to a constitutional republic."

On June 27, 2025, the Justice Department fired two supervising attorneys who had overseen the January 6 prosecutions and a line attorney who had prosecuted the cases.

=== Pardoned people ===
Norm Pattis, defense lawyer for the Proud Boys organizer Joe Biggs, called the pardons "wonderful" and expressed gratitude that Biggs would have his prison sentence cut short by 13 to 14 years. On June 6, 2025, Biggs, Nordean, Rehl, and Pezzola (who had had their sentences commuted) and Tarrio (who had been pardoned) sued the federal government. They sought $100 million in restitution for what they claimed had been, under the Biden administration, "egregious and systemic abuse of the legal system and the United States Constitution to punish and oppress political allies of President Trump."

Jacob Chansley's immediate reaction to being pardoned was to post to X that he would buy guns. Stewart Rhodes told reporters that his actions on January 6 were justified and called for the prosecution of the Capitol police who testified against him at his trial and the Justice Department lawyers involved in his case. Tarrio and Rhodes said they wanted Trump to seek revenge on their behalf. On January 22, Rhodes appeared on Capitol Hill and delivered a speech defending his actions.

Pamela Hemphill objected to the pardons, saying: "We were wrong that day. We broke the law. There should be no pardons", that accepting the pardon would "contribute to their gaslighting and false narrative" in an attempt to "rewrite history", and that the Justice Department was not weaponized against Trump supporters. Hemphill officially rejected her pardon in 2025 and has since been speaking out against the disinformation surrounding the 2020 election and events of January 6.

Jason Riddle also objected to his pardon, telling ABC News in January: "I am guilty of the crimes I have committed and accept the consequences. It is thanks to those consequences I now have a happy and fruitful existence." He also expressed resentment toward Trump, stating: "I don't need to obsess over a narcissistic bully to feel better about myself. Trump can shove his pardon up his ass." To help him formally reject the pardon, the office of Senator Maggie Hassan contacted the federal pardon office.

Rebecca Lavrenz, known on social media as the "J6 Praying Grandma", also declined her pardon, saying she planned to appeal her case and get her criminal record cleared. Lavrenz was convicted of four misdemeanor charges and sentenced to a year of probation, including six months of house arrest, and fined $103,000.

In December 2025, personal injury attorney Mark McCloskey submitted claims on behalf of about 400 former rioters, some who were seeking millions of dollars. "They can't get jobs, because soon as they apply for a job, they get Googled", McCloskey said.

Tarrio repeated his position at a march on the Capitol on January 6, 2026, saying that the pardons were "not enough" and that the Justice Department should prosecute those who had prosecuted January 6 defendants.

==== Family of pardoned people ====
Several family members and friends of convicted defendants celebrated the news outside of the D.C. Jail.

Jackson Reffitt reported his father, Guy Reffitt, days before the attack on the Capitol. He said that, after the attack on the Capitol, his father warned him not to report him because "traitors get shot". Jackson testified against him in court, and Guy was sentenced to over seven years in prison. On January 22, 2025, Jackson told MSNBC he had received death threats and feared what his father, having been pardoned, might do to him.

=== Police ===
Daniel Hodges, a Metropolitan Police Department officer whom rioters repeatedly assaulted and crushed during the attack, responded to the pardons on his Twitter account with a facetious post: "Thanks America." Former Metropolitan police officer Michael Fanone, who was beaten and tased until unconscious during the riot, was asked during a CNN interview what he would say to Oath Keepers founder Stewart Rhodes. Fanone replied, "Go fuck yourself. You're a liar".

Former Capitol Police Sergeant Aquilino Gonell called the pardons a "miserable" injustice that removed accountability from rioters who did "irreparable damage to our nation". Former Capitol Police officer Harry Dunn called them a "continuation of the stain that January 6th left on our nation" and said he was not surprised that Trump fulfilled his promise to people he had incited to attack the Capitol and its defenders.

The Fraternal Order of Police—the nation's largest police union, which endorsed Trump in each of the last three elections—joined the International Association of Chiefs of Police in condemning the mass pardon. In a joint statement on January 22, 2025, the organizations said the pardon of "individuals convicted of killing or assaulting law enforcement officers...sends a dangerous message that the consequences for attacking law enforcement are not severe".

=== Democrats ===
The day of the pardon, Nancy Pelosi, who was Speaker of the House of Representatives during the January 6 attack, called the proclamation "shameful" and an "outrageous insult" to police officers involved in and injured during the attack and to the nation's justice system. US Senator Adam Schiff called the pardon "obscene". Senate Democratic Leader Chuck Schumer condemned the pardons and said Trump was leading the nation to a "Golden Age" for insurrectionary criminals.

On January 27, Senator Patty Murray introduced a symbolic resolution to condemn Trump for pardoning the rioters. It was co-sponsored by all Senate Democrats and no Senate Republicans.

=== Republicans ===
Some Republican leaders, including Senators Lindsey Graham, Thom Tillis, James Lankford, Lisa Murkowski, Bill Cassidy, and Susan Collins, also expressed disagreement with the mass pardon.

House Speaker Mike Johnson supported the pardon, implying that the attack on the Capitol had been peaceful: "I think what was made clear all along is that peaceful protests and people who engage in that should never be punished."

Representative Lauren Boebert spoke favorably of the pardoned people: "I want to see them for their release, and you know, I'll be the first member of Congress to offer them a guided tour of the Capitol."

Senator Tommy Tuberville told ABC News that he fully supported the pardons. Asked about pardons for rioters who attacked police, Tuberville stated: "I don't believe it because I didn't see it."

A year after the pardon, Mike Pence, who had been vice president on the day of the attack, told Bill Maher:

I had no problem with the president pardoning people who got caught up in that day. But for anyone who assaulted a police officer, anybody that violated and vandalized the seat of our government and sought to disrupt the counting of electoral college votes, those people never should have been pardoned and they should never get a dime.

At the confirmation hearing of Acting U.S. Attorney General Todd Blanche on July 15, 2026, Senator Dick Durbin (a Democrat) asked Blanche for his opinion on the pardon. Blanche replied: "The Constitution gives the president the full power to pardon anybody for any reason he wants, and so I don’t question President Trump's authority or his decision to do so."

== Defendants involved in further crimes and incidents ==
Multiple January 6 defendants have been involved in additional crimes before or after being pardoned, including homicide, burglary, theft, stalking, child pornography, sexual assault on minors, and driving under the influence.

Sedition Hunters, an online community of open-source intelligence investigators who identified hundreds of participants in the Capitol attack, has an incomplete database of rioters with post-January 6 arrests or convictions.

In December 2025, the watchdog organization Citizens for Responsibility and Ethics in Washington reported that at least 33 defendants had been rearrested, charged, or sentenced for other crimes since the Capitol attack—four of whose alleged offenses occurred in 2025 after the pardon—while another, days after the pardon, was fatally shot during a traffic stop when he resisted arrest while armed. Former special counsel Jack Smith mentioned this in his public testimony before Congress in January 2026, saying it was "reasonable" to expect that the pardoned rioters would continue to commit crime.

In June 2026, the nonprofit online multimedia publication Lawfare reported that at least 97 of the individuals granted clemency by Trump had been arrested for, charged with, or convicted of crimes subsequent to the events of January 6. The publication assessed that nearly 1 in 16 Capitol attack participants had re-offended after receiving clemency, with at least 14 being charged with sex crimes or crimes related to child sexual abuse material, six facing domestic violence charges, and at least 20 being charged with driving under the influence or public intoxication.

- Zachary Jordan Alam, 33, of Centreville, Virginia, was arrested on May 9, 2025, for burglarizing a home. On November 7, 2024, Alam had been sentenced to eight years in prison, having been convicted of eight felonies and three misdemeanors for his actions in the Capitol attack, during which he smashed the glass door Ashli Babbitt attempted to climb through. According to The Washington Post, Alam was the first Capitol rioter to be arrested after being pardoned. In October 2025, Alam was convicted of two felonies in connection with the home invasion. On May 7, 2026, Alam was sentenced to 20 years in prison for the burglary conviction, 13 of which were suspended, as well as 20 years for the larceny convictions, all of which were suspended, for a total of seven years imprisonment.
- John Daniel Andries, faced several charges in different events:
  - He was arrested in March 2022 for an assault on a police officer and disorderly conduct.
  - In June 2025, he was found guilty of two counts for violating a peace order and sentenced to 60 days in jails and three years of unsupervised probation. The victim is the mother of his child.
- Daniel Ball, 38, of Homosassa, Florida, was re-arrested one day after being pardoned. Ball had been convicted of domestic violence battery by strangulation in June 2017, as well as battering and resisting law enforcement with violence in October 2021. In May 2023, Ball was arrested on felony charges in connection with the Capitol attack, during which he threw an explosive device. Ball faced an additional weapons charge for illegal possession of a gun and ammunition as a convicted felon.
- John Banuelos, 40, was arrested on October 17, 2025, in Cicero, Illinois; he was wanted in Salt Lake County, Utah, on an October 1 warrant for aggravated kidnapping and aggravated sexual assault. Prosecutors accused Banuelos of firing a gun during the riot, though no one was injured; his case was dismissed following Trump's blanket pardon. Banuelos also stabbed and killed a man named Christopher Thomas Senn in Salt Lake City, Utah on July 4, 2021, but was not charged after claiming self defense.
- Bryan Betancur Battisti, 26, of Silver Spring, Maryland, pleaded guilty in D.C. Superior Court in September 2024 to two counts of contempt of an anti-stalking order on a D.C. activist. He was sentenced to six months in jail on each count with all but 30 days suspended, for a total of 60 days; he must also serve two years of supervised probation. Battisti had previously served four months in prison after pleading guilty to one misdemeanor count of entering and remaining in a restricted grounds in connection with the Capitol attack, during which he helped Isabella DeLuca pass out a table that was later broken up and used to assault police. At the time of the riot, Battisti was on GPS monitoring for a fourth-degree burglary case out of Montgomery County, Maryland; after the riot, he was ordered to serve a previously suspended 18-month sentence. Charging documents described Battisti as a self-professed white supremacist who desired to be a "lone-wolf killer", having voiced support for the perpetrator of the Charlottesville car attack and expressing desire to run people over with a vehicle and kill people in a church. On March 2, 2026, Battisti was further charged with assault and battery for allegedly touching several women's hair on Metro trains the day prior. On August 12, 2026, Battisti was found guilty of one count of simple assault. The following day, Battisti was sentenced to 180 days in prison and ordered to pay a $50 fine.
- Jeremy Brown of Tampa, Florida, was sentenced in April 2023 to seven years and three months in prison after being convicted of weapons charges. While searching Brown's home in Florida in 2021, federal agents discovered stolen grenades, an unregistered rifle, and a stolen classified document. In February 2025, the Justice Department concluded that Brown's pardon also applied to his weapons conviction.
- Kyle Travis Colton, 36, of Citrus Heights, California, was indicted by a federal grand jury in February 2024 on a charge of receiving child pornography between July 2022 and December 2023. During the Capitol riot, Colton grabbed a flagpole a rioter was using to assault a Metropolitan Police Department officer, then gave it back to the rioter, who then fled into the crowd of rioters. If convicted of the child pornography charge, Colton faces 20 years in prison and a $250,000 fine. During trial, Colton unsuccessfully argued that the pardon should extend to his child pornography since it was discovered by a search during an investigation into his participation in January 6. On July 15, 2025, Colton was convicted of one count of receiving child pornography; his sentencing is set for October 27, 2025. On December 8, 2025, Colton was sentenced to 80 months in federal prison for his child pornography conviction.
- David Paul Daniel, 37, was indicted in October 2024 on federal charges of production of child pornography and possession of child pornography. Daniel also allegedly sexually assaulted a minor, made her shower with him, and took nude pictures of her between 2015 and 2019. Another person made similar accusations against Daniel.
- Renee Fatta, 43, and her boyfriend were arrested in January 2026 after a dispute with neighbors over packages being stolen escalated into Fatta's boyfriend using a rifle to fire one shot near the neighbors. Fatta was charged with second-degree criminal trespass and second-degree harassment.
- Joshua Dillon Haynes was arrested in July 2021 for assaulting a family member.
- Emily Hernandez, 22, of Sullivan, Missouri, fatally struck 32-year-old Victoria Wilson and injured Wilson's husband while driving under the influence down the wrong side of Interstate 44 in Franklin County, Missouri, in January 2022. Hernandez served 30 days in federal prison for her role in the Capitol riot, during which she was photographed holding the broken nameplate of then-House speaker Nancy Pelosi. On January 29, 2025, Hernandez was sentenced to 10 years in prison for causing Wilson's death.
- Brent John Holdridge, 59, of Arcata, California, was arrested for burglary and grand theft in May 2025 after allegedly stealing industrial copper wire valued at tens of thousands of dollars.
- Matthew Huttle, 42, of Hobart, Indiana, was fatally shot during a traffic stop in Rensselaer, Indiana, on January 26, 2025, less than a week after being pardoned. After being placed under arrest for being a habitual traffic violator, Huttle ran to the driver's seat of his vehicle and retrieved a firearm, claiming that he was going to shoot himself. The Jasper County deputy involved in the shooting was later cleared of any wrongdoing. At the time of his death, Huttle had at least 13 criminal convictions as well as a history of driving offenses, including a 2005 conviction for driving while intoxicated; his most recent case had been opened in May 2022. Huttle pleaded guilty to a battery case from Lake County, Indiana, in 2010, admitting to spanking his son "so hard that he left bruises all over the child's backside". He was sentenced to 2.5 years in prison and was released on May 12, 2013. In August 2023, Huttle had accepted a plea agreement in his Capitol riot case, pleading guilty to a misdemeanor. In November 2023, he was sentenced to six months in federal prison followed by 12 months of supervised release. Huttle was released in July 2024.
- Andrew Paul Johnson, 44, was extradited from Tennessee to Florida after being arrested on multiple child sexual abuse charges. Johnson allegedly told a boy he was messaging on Discord that he would be awarded $10 million for his Capitol riot involvement and would leave the boy any remaining money in his will. Johnson's abuse was stopped when he was arrested and jailed for the January 6 attack, but was able to return to abusing two children after his pardon. On February 10, 2026, a jury in Hernando County, Florida, found Johnson guilty of five charges—including molesting a child under the age of 12 and another under the age of 16, as well as lewd and lascivious exhibition—while acquitting him of one charge of sending sexual material to a child. On March 5, 2026, Johnson was sentenced to life in prison for his child sex abuse convictions.
- Daryl Johnson, 52, of St. Ansgar, Iowa, was arrested and charged with invasion of privacy, a misdemeanor, after using his cell phone to secretly record women tanning in his father's salon. He pleaded guilty and was sentenced to six months in prison, also needing to pay nearly $4,000 in fines and register as a sex offender. Johnson and his son Daniel had each pleaded guilty to a felony charge of civil disorder for their actions during the Capitol attack. Daryl Johnson posted a message on Facebook after the riot calling for "hangings on the front lawn of the capitol".
- Riley Kasper, 26, of Pulaski, Wisconsin, pleaded guilty in December 2025 to a misdemeanor charge of theft. He was sentenced to pay $140 in restitution and $473 in other court costs. Kasper had pleaded guilty in September 2023 to a federal charge of assaulting an officer during the Capitol attack, having boasted on social media that "I pepper sprayed 3 cops" and "there is definitely something satisfying about pepper spraying cops in riot gear". For the assault charge, Kasper was sentenced to 37 months in prison and two years of supervised release, as well as being ordered to pay $2,000 in restitution.
- Edward Kelley, 35, of Maryville, Tennessee, was convicted in November 2024 and sentenced to life in prison in July 2025 for conspiracy to murder federal employees, solicitation to commit a crime of violence, and influencing a federal official by threat. Earlier that month, Kelley had been convicted of three felonies: civil disorder, destruction of government property, and assaulting law enforcement. While awaiting trial on these charges, Kelley developed a "kill list" of FBI agents and others who participated in the investigation. A co-defendant testified that he and Kelley planned to attack to the FBI field office in Knoxville, Tennessee, with car bombs and incendiary devices attached to drones, in addition to assassinating FBI employees in their homes and in public places. Kelley was recorded stating: "Every hit has to hurt. Every hit has to hurt."
- Edward Jacob Lang (Jake Lang), a far-right influencer, white supremacist, and candidate in the 2026 United States Senate special election in Florida is sued for multiple crimes and misdemeanors following his pardon:
  - He was arrested after recording himself vandalizing an anti-United States Immigration and Customs Enforcement sculpture at the Minnesota State Capitol. Lang was arrested on the same day and jailed on suspicion of criminal damage to property, a felony. The ice sculpture had been commissioned and installed by the veterans organization Common Defense, whose communications director, Jacob Thomas, stated: "I gave eight years of my life in service to this country in the military. For an insurrectionist to destroy our display is an attack on the First Amendment veterans like me fought to defend".
  - In March 2026, Lang was charged with a misdemeanor for threatening Metropolitan Police officer Jason Bagshaw at an event commemorating the fifth anniversary of the Capitol attack, telling Bagshaw that he should be "put down like a dead dog" and hanged in front of the Capitol, as well as dragged "out by his ankles" and thrown "in the Potomac".
  - In March 2026, inappropriate texts exchanges with an underage girl were unveiled.
  - In August 2026, he was arrested on suspicion of rioting outside the Minneapolis city hall.
- Cleveland Meredith of North Carolina was arrested on November 2, 2026, for threatening to kill federal judges who presided over his case and those of other Capitol attackers, having made a Facebook post in April that read: "ALL J6 Federal JUDGES will be EXECUTED!" Meredith had been sentenced in December 2021 to 28 months after pleading guilty to a charge involving a threat he made to shoot Nancy Pelosi, who was serving as the speaker of the United States House of Representatives at the time.
- Theodore Middendorf was sentenced to 19 years in prison in May 2024 for sexual assault of a child; the victim was seven years old. His case regarding his January 6 involvement was dismissed by the Trump administration.
- Christopher Moynihan, 34, was arrested in October 2025 and charged with threatening to kill House Minority Leader Hakeem Jeffries at an Economic Club of New York event in New York City. According to a court filing by prosecutors, Moynihan wrote: "Hakeem Jeffries makes a speech in a few days in NYC I cannot allow this terrorist to live. Even if I am hated, he must be eliminated, I will kill him for the future." Moynihan was one of the first rioters to breach police barricades and enter the Capitol grounds, and he rifled through a notebook on top of a senator's desk during the attack. In August 2022, Moynihan was found guilty of obstructing an official proceeding and pleaded guilty to five misdemeanor charges. In February 2023, he was sentenced to 21 months in prison. In February 2026, Moynihan pleaded guilty to a misdemeanor harassment charge, for which he will be sentenced in April 2026.
- Jonathan Munafo was arrested in Richmond, Virginia, in March 2026 for allegedly violating supervised release conditions in a federal threat case. During the Capitol attack, Munafo punched a Metropolitan Police Department officer twice while attempting to rip the officer's riot shield away. Moreover, the day prior to the attack, Munafo made dozens of threatening phone calls to a government facility near Battle Creek, Michigan, during which he threatened to "cut the throat" of a 911 dispatcher and threatened the dispatcher's family.
- Ryan Taylor Nichols, 35, of Diana, Texas, was jailed in Harrison County, Texas, on charges of deadly conduct and harassment out of Panola County, Texas. Nichols allegedly confronted an individual in the parking lot of a church and displayed his firearm as the individual attempted to leave. For his participation in the Capitol attack, Nichols pleaded guilty to felony offenses of obstruction of an official proceeding and assaulting, resisting, or impeding certain officers. On May 2, 2024, Nichols was sentenced by U.S. District Judge Royce Lamberth to 63 months in prison and 36 months of supervised release, as well as being ordered to pay a fine of $200,000, restitution of $2,000, and a special assessment of $200. Following his participation in the Capitol riot, Nichols posted a video to Facebook in which he called for violence, stating: "If you want to know where Ryan Nichols stands, Ryan Nichols stands for violence."
- Robert Keith Packer, 60, of Newport News, Virginia, was arrested in September 2025 and charged in connection with a dog attack that left four people injured. In January 2022, Packer, who had been photographed wearing a "Camp Auschwitz" sweatshirt during the Capitol riot, pleaded guilty to parading, demonstrating, or picketing in a Capitol building. He was sentenced to 75 days in prison with a $500 fine for restitution.
- Peter J. Schwartz was arrested in Corpus Christi, Texas, on September 9, 2026, and charged with driving with a suspended license, possession of a controlled substance, and unlawful carrying of a weapon.
- Abigail Jo Shry of Alvin, Texas, was sentenced to 27 months in prison for threatening Tanya Chutkan, a United States district judge who was presiding over the federal prosecution of Trump.
- Thomas Sibick was charged with several counts of felony weapon possession in Erie County, New York.
- Alan Michael St. Onge, 35, was arrested in 2023 for having punched a woman in the throat after his sexual advances were rejected.
- Andrew Quentin Taake, 36, of Houston, Texas, was charged with online solicitation of a minor after a 2016 incident in which he sent sexually explicit messages to an undercover law enforcement officer posing as a 15-year-old girl. During the Capitol attack, Taake used bear spray and a metal whip to assault officers. He was caught after bragging about the incident to a woman he met on a dating app. Taake pleaded guilty in 2023, and in June 2024, he was sentenced to six years in prison. He was credited with 1,306 days of time served and required to register as a sex offender for 10 years.
- Taylor Taranto, 39, of Pasco, Washington, was convicted on May 20, 2025, of illegally carrying two firearms without a license, unlawfully possessing ammunition, and false information and hoaxes, all connected to a 2023 live streamed video in which he claimed that he was on a "one-way mission" to blow up the National Institute of Standards and Technology in Gaithersburg, Maryland. Taranto was arrested the next day while live streaming near former president Barack Obama's house in Washington, D.C. On October 29, two federal prosecutors, Carlos Valdivia and Samuel White, filed a sentencing memo, accurately reflecting the court record that Trump had posted Obama's supposed address and that Taranto had reposted it. Hours later, they were put on administrative leave and the memo was removed from the court record. This happened after Politico reporter Kyle Cheney pointed out that the memo said Taranto had been a January 6 rioter. The memo was immediately resubmitted by new two prosecutors, minus any references to Trump or to Taranto's repost of what Trump said about Obama. On October 30, U.S. District Judge Carl J. Nichols sentenced Taranto to 21 months in prison, which amounted to time served due to Taranto's time in pretrial custody, plus 36 months of supervised release, and ordered drug testing and a mental health assessment. In early December, local police spotted Taranto near Representative Jamie Raskin's home; Raskin increased his personal security, using a Capitol Police escort.
- Nathan Thornsberry, 44, of North Branch, Michigan, was charged with felony third-degree criminal sexual conduct for alleging sexually assaulting a woman during a message appointment in Rochester Hills, Michigan, for which he faces up to 15 years in prison.
- Daniel Tocci of Amherst, Massachusetts, was sentenced in March 2026 to four years of incarceration followed by five years of supervised release after pleading guilty to child pornography possession.
- Chance Anthony Uptmore, 25, of San Antonio, Texas, was convicted on April 11, 2022, of being an unlawful user of a controlled substance in possession of a firearm; he faced up to 10 years in prison. On July 26, 2022, Uptmore was sentenced to three months of house arrest and five years of probation.
- David Walls-Kaufman, 69, was ordered in June 2025 to pay $380,000 in punitive damages and $60,000 in compensatory damages to Erin Smith for assaulting her husband Jeffrey L. Smith during the Capitol attack.
- Daniel Edwin Wilson, 49, was ordered to return to prison to serve the remainder of his five-year sentence for separate firearm convictions after being erroneously released from custody. In June 2022, law enforcement executing a federal search warrant seized six firearms from Wilson's home, which he was prohibited from possessing as a convicted felon. On November 14, 2025, Trump granted Wilson a second pardon for his firearm convictions.
- Shane Jason Woods, also known as Shane Castleman, 44, of Auburn, Illinois, fatally struck 35-year-old Lauren Wegner and injured two other people while driving down the wrong side of Interstate 55 in Sangamon County, Illinois, in November 2022. His blood alcohol content was more than twice the legal limit. Woods was the 500th person arrested in connection with the Capitol attack and the first to be charged with assaulting a member of the media. During the riot, he tackled a female Capitol Police officer whom he outweighed by more than 100 pounds, as well as a Reuters cameraman. On October 4, 2023, Woods was sentenced to 54 months in prison and 36 months of supervised release for his role in the Capitol attack. On April 30, 2025, he was acquitted of first-degree murder in Wegner's death but convicted of aggravated driving under the influence and reckless homicide. On August 19, 2025, Woods was sentenced to 17 years in prison for Wegner's killing.
- Caroline Wren, a Republican fundraiser who co-organized Trump's "Save America" rally on the day of the Capitol attack, did not attend a virtual hearing on July 9, 2025. U.S. District Judge Donald Middlebrooks found her in civil contempt and ordered her to pay $2,000 a day until she responded to the subpoena. U.S. Capitol police officers subpoenaed her in early 2024 seeking information for their lawsuit against Trump.
- Ryan K. Yates, 40, was arrested in May 2026 along with 265 other people as part of undercover, multi-day operation in Polk County, Florida; he was charged with soliciting another for prostitution and released on a $1,000 bond. Yates had been sentenced in June 2024 to 6 months in prison, 3 months of home detention, 24 months of supervised release, and $2,000 in restitution after pleading guilty to a felony charge stemming from his participation in the Capitol attack.

== See also ==
- List of people granted executive clemency in the second Trump presidency
- List of people pardoned or granted clemency by the president of the United States
