= Sedition Hunters =

Jan 6 Capitol attack online investigation group

Sedition Hunters is an online community of open-source intelligence investigators working to identify individuals who took part in the January 6, 2021, United States Capitol attack. They examine still photos and video footage from publicly available sources, social media sites like Twitter and Parler, video platforms, and other social media and submit that research to the FBI in the form of a tip.

The Sedition Hunters community has created and deployed a number of advanced tools to help study the January 6 United States Capitol attack. Among the earliest was an interactive map, showing videos recorded of the event that had embedded GPS location tags. Later, the community created a public facial recognition database to quickly find suspects in terabytes of footage.

The FBI has relied on groups like the Sedition Hunters due to the large number of suspects, estimated at 2,000.

On January 20, 2025, the first day of his second presidency, Donald Trump issued a pardon of January 6 United States Capitol attack defendants, granting blanket clemency to everyone charged in connection with the attack.
