= Alice Butler-Short =

American political activist (1943–2021)

Alice Butler-Short (née Butler, born 1943, died 30 March 2021) was the founder of Virginia Women for Trump, an American advocacy group supportive of former American president Donald Trump.

== Political activism ==
Butler-Short said she became politically active as soon as she was able to vote, and always voted Republican since the days of President George H. W. Bush. She believed that the United States is currently on the verge of downfall because of the Democrats, who she believed "want to move our great country to socialism", and that she was a Republican activist because she believed it would lead to a better future for her children.

Butler-Short was a "passionate" supporter of Trump since February 2015, when she saw him at the Conservative Political Action Conference. She founded Virginia Women for Trump in October 2015 "to debunk the myth that women did not like Trump". She also helped other states set up their own Women for Trump chapters.

Virginia Women for Trump's support base is made up of a coalition of Republicans supportive of Trump; this includes men and women from Pakistan, Vietnam, Mexico, Colombia and Iran, as well as the United States. Butler-Short, described the group as "all about promoting unity", describing Donald Trump as "the president for all Americans".

She described herself and the group as anti-feminist, in favor of a strong U.S. military presence for self-defence, and wanted tougher control on the U.S.–Mexico border to deter immigration. Although supportive of America First policies, she supported military and economic aid to U.S. allies.

Butler-Short said that the group opposed the removal of Confederate monuments and memorials, calling the removal of a Robert E. Lee statue in Virginia illegal under Virginia law (this law was changed in 2020), saying "Do we change the name of Washington, D.C.? Do we pull down the Jefferson Memorial? This is ridiculous. These are the tactics of communists." She also praised Trump's remarks on a white supremacist rally in Charlottesville, where he said there were "very fine people on both sides" (referring to the white supremacist protesters and counter-protesters).

The group held annual "Tea for Trump" birthday parties at the Trump Hotel; its 2018 meeting featured a runway show partially scored to the North Korean national anthem to celebrate Trump's negotiations with North Korea. White House Press Secretary Sarah Huckabee Sanders was awarded the MAGA Woman of the Year award in absentia. In February 2019, conservative political consultant Roger Stone appeared at a Virginia Women for Trump event.

Butler-Short also defended the Trump administration's family separation and internment policies for migrant children.

In 2019, the Trump campaign issued a cease and desist letter to Butler-Short, because they said the group had used Trump's image without permission in connection with fundraising. Trump's 2020 campaign repeatedly said the group was "not sanctioned" by the campaign.

Rabia Kazan is a Turkish women's rights journalist who spoke at VWT events in February 2019. She initially supported Trump for his comments on Islam, but later denounced groups within the pro-Trump movement (such as VWT) as cultists. In response, Butler-Short sent a message to Kazan in intentionally broken English for her to put up on social media, which would have supported Trump and claimed Kazan was seeking psychiatric help.

Butler-Short said that she felt "horrified" at the murder of George Floyd, and described Trump's walk to St. John's Church as "very meaningful", denying that it was a photo opportunity.

Butler-Short made it clear in 2020 that she does not accept Joe Biden as the next legitimate President of the United States.

Traveling to Washington, D.C. on January 5, Butler-Short said that she was protesting against a stolen election. VWT sponsored a "One Nation Under God" rally outside the Supreme Court that day. She spoke out against the deadly riots at the Capitol which occurred the following day, but denied Trump's culpability in inciting the crowd; she later claimed that the event was a "peaceful march".

== Personal life ==
Butler-Short was born in Cahir, County Tipperary, Ireland.

She lived in Lorton, Virginia and was a U.S. citizen. She described herself as "a product of a great Catholic family and a great Irish education".

Butler-Short moved to London when she was 18 and met her first husband there. He was Chinese, and they moved to Hong Kong, living together for 13 years. The family had to leave Hong Kong for political reasons and moved to Canada. She met her second spouse, a U.S. Army colonel, in Canada following her husband's death. They moved to the U.S. in 1983, and she accompanied him overseas before returning to the U.S. in 1993.
