= List of cases of the January 6 United States Capitol attack =

On January 6, 2021, thousands of Trump supporters participated in the U.S. Capitol attack, disrupting the joint session of Congress assembled to count electoral votes to formalize Joe Biden's victory in the 2020 United States presidential election.

By the end of the year, 725 people had been charged with federal crimes. That number rose to 1,000 by the second anniversary of the attack, to 1,200 by the third anniversary (three-quarters of whom had by then been found guilty) and to 1,500 before the fourth anniversary. As of January 20, 2025, 1,575 people had been charged in connection with the January 6 attack, of whom 1,021 had pleaded guilty and 249 had been convicted at trial.

Upon Donald Trump's inauguration on January 20, 2025, he pardoned all but 14 of those people. The remaining 14 people, though their convictions stood, were eligible for immediate release from prison, as he commuted their sentences to "time served". Following Trump's pardons, the United States Department of Justice (DOJ) moved to dismiss some cases awaiting trial or sentencing. In April 2026, DOJ prosecutors filed a request to vacate the felony convictions for four Proud Boys who had received commutations rather than pardons, and indicated an intention to make similar requests for other January 6 defendants who had received commutations.

After the pardon, some January 6 defendants and their survivors moved to sue the Department of Justice and federal law enforcement agencies. Most notably, the Department of Justice agreed to pay the family of Ashli Babbitt, who was fatally shot in the Capitol assault, $5 million in a lawsuit settlement. Other January 6 defendants have gone to court to have their sentencing fines refunded, or to file claims against the U.S. Department of Justice and other federal law enforcement agencies for injuries or property damage. In March 2026, some January 6 defendants and others present at the protest that day filed a class action lawsuit against the U.S. federal government, alleging that the U.S. Capitol Police and the Washington, D.C. Metropolitan Police Department caused the plaintiffs physical and emotional injuries while defending the Capitol.

In May 2026, a new "Anti-Weaponization Fund" was announced, setting aside $1.776 billion of public funds to distribute to Trump allies who claimed to be victims of federal "weaponization and lawfare". This was described as part of a settlement to end Trump's lawsuit against the Internal Revenue Service. Facing pushback, however, the DOJ said it would not pursue the fund. A judge has demanded proof. Another judge sanctioned the attorneys.

Days after the fund was announced, the Department of Justice acknowledged it was removing news releases from its websites that had documented criminal charges, convictions and sentencings of January 6 rioters. It described these prosecutions as "the DOJ’s weaponization under the Biden administration" and the news releases about them as "partisan propaganda". Lawfare Media published the deleted Department of Justice press releases in a database; as of June 9, 2026, it contained over 5,700 restored documents. Thomas Joscelyn, a principal author of the final report from the United States House Select Committee on the January 6 Attack, has also published a set of Department of Justice news releases and court filings relating to the attack.

== Previous sources of information ==
A list of "breach" cases, meaning cases in which the defendant was alleged to have entered a restricted area of the Capitol during the riot, was kept updated by the US Attorney's Office, District of Columbia. It was available until the morning of January 24, 2025, four days after President Trump had issued a blanket pardon, but later in the day, it said "Page not found". CNN reported its erasure the next day. Soon afterwards, some of the video evidence that had been part of court cases related to the prosecutions disappeared from a government server. A coalition of press organizations went to court over the missing evidence, and a judge subsequently ordered the government to stop removing the materials.

NPR has a database of all 1,575 cases in the Capitol attack prior to Trump's pardons, searchable by U.S. state, charges, and case status.

For plea deals entered between April–October 2021, BuzzFeed has a searchable table. After Trump's mass pardon in 2025, the Democratic Secretary of States Association launched a website to track the Capitol attackers' ongoing legal issues. Lawfare Media released a study on January 6 clemency recipients who were subsequently arrested or convicted of other crimes since the attack, finding 97 such cases as of June 4, 2026.

== Index of names ==
- List of cases of the January 6 United States Capitol attack (A-F)
- List of cases of the January 6 United States Capitol attack (G-L)
- List of cases of the January 6 United States Capitol attack (M-S)
- List of cases of the January 6 United States Capitol attack (T-Z)

== Groups of defendants ==
- June 10, 2021 – The Los Angeles FBI Field Office arrested and charged six Southern California individuals in relation to the January 6 riots. Of the six individuals, three of them self-identified in Telegram chats as members of the Three Percenters. They are all charged with multiple felonies, including conspiracy, obstructing an official proceeding, and unlawful entry on restricted building or grounds. One of the charged, the former police chief of the city of La Habra, California, was charged with obstructing law enforcement during a civil disorder and unlawful possession of a dangerous weapon on Capitol grounds. Two members of the Three Percenters were additionally charged with tampering with documents or proceedings related to their deletion of Telegram chats and content to avoid detection by law enforcement. The six men, along with at least thirty others, were part of a private Telegram group which planned to attack the Capitol on January 6 and conspired to bring weapons.
- June 11, 2021 – The FBI announced arrests and charges for three people, two from Minnesota and one from Iowa, who participated in the events on Jan 6. A man from Minneapolis, Minnesota, faced charges for his alleged actions of breaking through a police line and assaulting two Capitol police officers. According to his charging documents, the man posted photos of himself on Facebook and made claims that he was "beating up cops" while in Washington, D.C. A man from Austin, Minnesota, and his father, a resident of St. Ansgar, Iowa, were arrested without resistance and faced charges related to participating in events inside the Capitol building.
- October 4, 2021 – Three men from Lindstrom, Minnesota, were charged with several federal counts for entering the Capitol building and assaulting police officers on January 6. They were among eight people in total from Minnesota charged in connection with the events.

== See also ==
- Criminal proceedings in the January 6 United States Capitol attack
